= 2008 French Open – Women's singles qualifying =

Women's singles qualifying
- 2008 French Open

Events
Singles	men	women		boys	girls
Doubles	men	women	mixed	boys	girls
WC Singles	men	women	quad
WC Doubles	men	women	quad
Legends	−45	45+	women

Qualification
Singles	men	women
- French Open

This article displays the qualifying draw for the women's singles at the 2008 French Open.

== Seeds ==
1. (Czech Republic) Iveta Benešová (qualified)
2. (Romania) Monica Niculescu (qualifying competition, lucky loser)
3. (Estonia) Maret Ani (first round)
4. (Belgium) Yanina Wickmayer (qualified)
5. (United Kingdom) Anne Keothavong (first round)
6. (Germany) Julia Görges (qualifying competition)
7. (United States) Bethanie Mattek (qualified)
8. (Czech Republic) Renata Voráčová (first round)
9. (Australia) Alicia Molik (first round)
10. (United Kingdom) Katie O'Brien (second round)
11. (Russia) Olga Puchkova (qualifying competition)
12. (Spain) Lourdes Domínguez Lino (first round)
13. (Spain) Carla Suárez Navarro (qualified)
14. (Czech Republic) Barbora Strýcová (first round)
15. (Hungary) Melinda Czink (first round)
16. (Germany) Julia Schruff (first round)
17. (Russia) Anna Lapushchenkova (qualifying competition)
18. (Russia) Yaroslava Shvedova (first round)
19. (United States) Ahsha Rolle (second round)
20. (Russia) Vesna Manasieva (first round)
21. (Belarus) Tatiana Poutchek (first round)
22. (Italy) Roberta Vinci (first round)
23. (United States) Varvara Lepchenko (first round)
24. (United Kingdom) Elena Baltacha (first round)

== Qualifiers ==
1. (Czech Republic) Iveta Benešová
2. (Croatia) Jelena Pandžić
3. (Russia) Anastasia Pavlyuchenkova
4. (Belgium) Yanina Wickmayer
5. (Tunisia) Selima Sfar
6. (Belarus) Anastasiya Yakimova
7. (United States) Bethanie Mattek
8. (Slovakia) Magdaléna Rybáriková
9. (Slovakia) Jarmila Gajdošová
10. (China) Zheng Jie
11. (Spain) Carla Suárez Navarro
12. (Spain) María José Martínez Sánchez

== Lucky loser ==
1. (Romania) Monica Niculescu

== Qualifying draw ==
Key

- Q = Qualifier
- WC = Wild card
- LL = Lucky loser
- Alt = Alternate
- ITF = ITF entry
- PR = Protected ranking
- SR = Special ranking
- SE = Special exempt
- JE = Junior exempt
- JR = Junior Accelerator Programme entrant
- CO = College Accelerator Programme entrant
- NG = Next Gen Accelerator Program entrant
- w/o = Walkover
- r = Retired
- d = Defaulted

=== First qualifier ===
First round
1	(Czech Republic) Iveta Benešová	4	6	6
(Ukraine) Viktoriya Kutuzova	6	0	4
(Russia) Anastasia Pivovarova	3	1
(Hungary) Gréta Arn	6	6
(Bosnia and Herzegovina) Sandra Martinović	7	6
(Japan) Kumiko Iijima	5	2
WC	(France) Laura Thorpe	6	4	4
19	(United States) Ahsha Rolle	4	6	6

Second round
1	(Czech Republic) Iveta Benešová	7^{7}	0	6
(Hungary) Gréta Arn	6^{4}	6	1
(Bosnia and Herzegovina) Sandra Martinović	3	6	11
19	(United States) Ahsha Rolle	6	4	9

Qualifying competition
1	(Czech Republic) Iveta Benešová	5	6	6
(Bosnia and Herzegovina) Sandra Martinović	7	1	1

=== Second qualifier ===
First round
2	(Romania) Monica Niculescu	6	6
WC	(France) Irena Pavlovic	3	3
(United States) Raquel Kops-Jones	6	5	4
(Germany) Angelika Bachmann	2	7	6
(Croatia) Jelena Pandžić	2	6	6
(Czech Republic) Eva Hrdinová	6	1	4
(France) Julie Coin	4	7	7
18	(Russia) Yaroslava Shvedova	6	5	5

Second round
2	(Romania) Monica Niculescu	6	6
(Germany) Angelika Bachmann	1	1
(Croatia) Jelena Pandžić	6	6
(France) Julie Coin	3	1

Qualifying competition
2	(Romania) Monica Niculescu	6	5	4
(Croatia) Jelena Pandžić	2	7	6

=== Third qualifier ===
First round
3	(Estonia) Maret Ani	1	4
(Russia) Anastasia Pavlyuchenkova	6	6
(South Africa) Chanelle Scheepers	6	6
(Croatia) Nika Ožegović	4	4
WC	(France) Kinnie Laisné	6	6
(Japan) Natsumi Hamamura	1	1
(Canada) Marie-Ève Pelletier	0	5
17	(Russia) Anna Lapushchenkova	6	7

Second round
(Russia) Anastasia Pavlyuchenkova	5	6	6
(South Africa) Chanelle Scheepers	7	2	3
WC	(France) Kinnie Laisné	6	3	3
17	(Russia) Anna Lapushchenkova	4	6	6

Qualifying competition
(Russia) Anastasia Pavlyuchenkova	7	6
17	(Russia) Anna Lapushchenkova	5	2

=== Fourth qualifier ===
First round
4	(Belgium) Yanina Wickmayer	6	6
WC	(France) Virginie Pichet	3	3
(Georgia (country)) Margalita Chakhnashvili	7	1	6
(Japan) Rika Fujiwara	5	6	3
(Poland) Anna Korzeniak	6^{6}	0
(Croatia) Jelena Kostanić Tošić	7^{8}	6
(Switzerland) Emmanuelle Gagliardi	6	6
21	(Belarus) Tatiana Poutchek	2	3

Second round
4	(Belgium) Yanina Wickmayer	6	6
(Georgia (country)) Margalita Chakhnashvili	1	4
(Croatia) Jelena Kostanić Tošić	0	2
(Switzerland) Emmanuelle Gagliardi	6	6

Qualifying competition
4	(Belgium) Yanina Wickmayer	4	6	6
(Switzerland) Emmanuelle Gagliardi	6	3	2

=== Fifth qualifier ===
First round
5	(United Kingdom) Anne Keothavong	1	4
(China) Zhang Shuai	6	6
(Ukraine) Tetiana Luzhanska	2	6	6
(Czech Republic) Sandra Záhlavová	6	3	4
(Romania) Ágnes Szatmári	4	4
(Tunisia) Selima Sfar	6	6
(Czech Republic) Hana Šromová	5	6	7
15	(Hungary) Melinda Czink	7	3	5

Second round
(China) Zhang Shuai	1	3
(Ukraine) Tetiana Luzhanska	6	6
(Tunisia) Selima Sfar	6	6
(Czech Republic) Hana Šromová	1	3

Qualifying competition
(Ukraine) Tetiana Luzhanska	1	4
(Tunisia) Selima Sfar	6	6

=== Sixth qualifier ===
First round
6	(Germany) Julia Görges	6	1	6
(Russia) Ekaterina Ivanova	4	6	1
(Belgium) Kirsten Flipkens	6	4	6
(United States) Abigail Spears	0	6	4
(Japan) Junri Namigata	5	3
(Belarus) Anastasiya Yakimova	7	6
(Belarus) Ekaterina Dzehalevich	7^{7}	6
14	(Czech Republic) Barbora Strýcová	6^{5}	3

Second round
6	(Germany) Julia Görges	6	6
(Belgium) Kirsten Flipkens	3	3
(Belarus) Anastasiya Yakimova	6	4	7
(Belarus) Ekaterina Dzehalevich	1	6	5

Qualifying competition
6	(Germany) Julia Görges	4	3
(Belarus) Anastasiya Yakimova	6	6

=== Seventh qualifier ===
First round
7	(United States) Bethanie Mattek	6	6
(Russia) Alina Jidkova	4	2
(Estonia) Margit Rüütel	7	6
WC	(France) Stéphanie Vongsouthi	5	2
(Argentina) Jorgelina Cravero	6	6
(Belarus) Darya Kustova	0	1
(Ukraine) Oxana Lyubtsova	6	6
24	(United Kingdom) Elena Baltacha	0	4

Second round
7	(United States) Bethanie Mattek	6	6^{3}	6
(Estonia) Margit Rüütel	2	7^{7}	2
(Argentina) Jorgelina Cravero	4	5
(Ukraine) Oxana Lyubtsova	6	7

Qualifying competition
7	(United States) Bethanie Mattek	7	4	6
(Ukraine) Oxana Lyubtsova	5	6	1

=== Eighth qualifier ===
First round
8	(Czech Republic) Renata Voráčová	4	5
(Japan) Akiko Yonemura	6	7
(Portugal) Neuza Silva	3	3
(Australia) Christina Wheeler	6	6
(Sweden) Johanna Larsson	6	3	6
(Italy) Corinna Dentoni	2	6	2
(Slovakia) Magdaléna Rybáriková	2	7^{7}	8
22	(Italy) Roberta Vinci	6	6^{4}	6

Second round
(Japan) Akiko Yonemura	1	1
(Australia) Christina Wheeler	6	6
(Sweden) Johanna Larsson	1	2
(Slovakia) Magdaléna Rybáriková	6	6

Qualifying competition
(Australia) Christina Wheeler	2	0
(Slovakia) Magdaléna Rybáriková	6	6

=== Ninth qualifier ===
First round
9	(Australia) Alicia Molik	2	2
(Czech Republic) Zuzana Ondrášková	6	6
(Slovakia) Jarmila Gajdošová	6	6
(Spain) Marta Marrero	2	0
(United Kingdom) Naomi Cavaday	3	5
(Switzerland) Stefanie Vögele	6	7
(Argentina) Betina Jozami	6	7^{7}
20	(Russia) Vesna Manasieva	4	6^{3}

Second round
(Czech Republic) Zuzana Ondrášková	4	1
(Slovakia) Jarmila Gajdošová	6	6
(Switzerland) Stefanie Vögele	2	4
(Argentina) Betina Jozami	6	6

Qualifying competition
(Slovakia) Jarmila Gajdošová	7^{8}	6
(Argentina) Betina Jozami	6^{6}	3

=== Tenth qualifier ===
First round
10	(United Kingdom) Katie O'Brien	7	6
(United Kingdom) Melanie South	5	1
(Germany) Kristina Barrois	2	7^{7}	6
(United States) Sunitha Rao	6	6^{3}	2
(Czech Republic) Lucie Hradecká	6	5	6
(China) Zheng Jie	4	7	8
WC	(France) Charlotte Rodier	2	6	6
23	(United States) Varvara Lepchenko	6	3	4

Second round
10	(United Kingdom) Katie O'Brien	4	2
(Germany) Kristina Barrois	6	6
(China) Zheng Jie	6	6
WC	(France) Charlotte Rodier	0	3

Qualifying competition
(Germany) Kristina Barrois	3	6^{4}
(China) Zheng Jie	6	7^{7}

=== Eleventh qualifier ===
First round
11	(Russia) Olga Puchkova	6	7
(Poland) Urszula Radwańska	3	5
(Netherlands) Brenda Schultz-McCarthy	6	6
WC	(France) Chloé Babet	2	2
(Australia) Sophie Ferguson	2	6	7
(Romania) Anda Perianu	6	2	5
(Australia) Monique Adamczak	3	3
13	(Spain) Carla Suárez Navarro	6	6

Second round
11	(Russia) Olga Puchkova	6	6
(Netherlands) Brenda Schultz-McCarthy	2	1
(Australia) Sophie Ferguson	3	7	5
13	(Spain) Carla Suárez Navarro	6	5	7

Qualifying competition
11	(Russia) Olga Puchkova	2	0
13	(Spain) Carla Suárez Navarro	6	6

=== Twelfth qualifier ===
First round
12	(Spain) Lourdes Domínguez Lino	3	3
(Spain) María José Martínez Sánchez	6	6
(Belgium) Caroline Maes	6	6
(Romania) Simona Matei	0	2
(Germany) Kathrin Wörle	3	6	6
WC	(France) Estelle Guisard	6	1	0
(Colombia) Mariana Duque	6	6
16	(Germany) Julia Schruff	3	4

Second round
(Spain) María José Martínez Sánchez	6	4	6
(Belgium) Caroline Maes	4	6	4
(Germany) Kathrin Wörle	5	3
(Colombia) Mariana Duque	7	6

Qualifying competition
(Spain) María José Martínez Sánchez	6	4	6
(Colombia) Mariana Duque	3	6	4
