= 2009 French Open – Boys' doubles =

Boys' doubles
- 2009 French Open

Final
- Champion: (Croatia) Marin Draganja (Croatia) Dino Marcan
- Runner-up: (Brazil) Guilherme Clézar (Chinese Taipei) Huang Liang-chi
- Score: 6–3, 6–2

Events
Singles	men	women		boys	girls
Doubles	men	women	mixed	boys	girls
WC Singles	men	women	quad
WC Doubles	men	women	quad
Legends	−45	45+	women
← 2008 ·	French Open	· 2010 →

Henri Kontinen and Christopher Rungkat were the defending champions, but did not compete in the Juniors this year.

Marin Draganja and Dino Marcan won in the final 6–3, 6–2, against Guilherme Clézar and Huang Liang-chi.

== Seeds ==
1. (Argentina) Andrea Collarini / (Argentina) Agustín Velotti (second round)
2. (France) Gianni Mina / (France) Julien Obry (second round)
3. (United States) Tennys Sandgren / (Guatemala) Julen Uriguen (first round)
4. (Brazil) Guilherme Clézar / (Chinese Taipei) Huang Liang-chi (final)
5. (United States) Evan King / (United States) Denis Kudla (quarterfinals)
6. (Germany) Dominik Schulz / (Venezuela) David Souto (semifinals)
7. (Japan) Hiroyasu Ehara / (Japan) Shuichi Sekiguchi (quarterfinals)
8. (Belgium) Arthur De Greef / (Belgium) Yannik Reuter (first round)

== Draw ==
=== Key ===
- Q = Qualifier
- WC = Wild card
- LL = Lucky loser
- Alt = Alternate
- ITF = ITF entry
- PR = Protected ranking
- SR = Special ranking
- SE = Special exempt
- JE = Junior exempt
- JR = Junior Accelerator Programme entrant
- CO = College Accelerator Programme entrant
- NG = Next Gen Accelerator Program entrant
- w/o = Walkover
- r = Retired
- d = Defaulted

=== Finals ===
Semifinals
(Sweden) Patrik Brydolf (Czech Republic) Radim Urbanek	4	2
4	(Brazil) Guilherme Clézar (Chinese Taipei) Huang Liang-chi	6	6
(Croatia) Marin Draganja (Croatia) Dino Marcan	6	6
6	(Germany) Dominik Schulz (Venezuela) David Souto	4	2

Final
4	(Brazil) Guilherme Clézar (Chinese Taipei) Huang Liang-chi	3	2
(Croatia) Marin Draganja (Croatia) Dino Marcan	6	6

=== Top half ===
First round
1	(Argentina) A Collarini (Argentina) A Velotti	4	6	[10]
(Italy) Emanuele Molina (Italy) Francesco Picco	6	2	[6]
(United States) D Britton (United States) J Cox	6	1	[10]
(Finland) H Laaksonen (Belarus) A Vasilevski	4	6	[7]
(Spain) Carlos Boluda-Purkiss (Spain) P Carreño Busta	6	7
WC	(France) Cedrick Commin (France) Mick Lescure	4	6^{6}
(Sweden) P Brydolf (Czech Republic) Radim Urbanek	6	6
8	(Belgium) A De Greef (Belgium) Y Reuter	2	2
4	(Brazil) G Clézar (Chinese Taipei) L-c Huang	6	6
(Germany) R Becker (Germany) K Krawietz	3	4
(Sweden) D Berta (Italy) Federico Gaio	1	3
(Philippines) FC Alcantara (Chinese Taipei) C-p Hsieh	6	6
(United States) Harry Fowler (United States) Mitchell Frank	6	6
(Germany) A Georgoudas (New Zealand) Riki Mclachlan	3	4
WC	(France) R Arneodo (France) TK Wang	0	7	[5]
7	(Japan) Hiroyasu Ehara (Japan) Shuichi Sekiguchi	6	5	[10]

Second round
1	(Argentina) A Collarini (Argentina) A Velotti	6	5	[5]
(United States) D Britton (United States) J Cox	2	7	[10]
(Spain) C Boluda-Purkiss (Spain) P Carreño Busta	6^{6}	4
(Sweden) P Brydolf (Czech Republic) R Urbanek	7	6
4	(Brazil) G Clézar (Chinese Taipei) L-c Huang	7	3	[10]
(Philippines) FC Alcantara (Chinese Taipei) C-p Hsieh	5	6	[6]
(United States) H Fowler (United States) M Frank	2	1
7	(Japan) H Ehara (Japan) S Sekiguchi	6	6

Quarterfinals
(United States) D Britton (United States) J Cox	6	2	[6]
(Sweden) P Brydolf (Czech Republic) R Urbanek	2	6	[10]
4	(Brazil) G Clézar (Chinese Taipei) L-c Huang	6	6
7	(Japan) H Ehara (Japan) S Sekiguchi	2	3

Semifinals
(Sweden) P Brydolf (Czech Republic) R Urbanek	4	2
4	(Brazil) G Clézar (Chinese Taipei) L-c Huang	6	6

=== Bottom half ===
First round
5	(United States) E King (United States) D Kudla	6	4	[10]
(Russia) M Biryukov (Japan) Y Uchiyama	4	6	[5]
(Ecuador) E Gómez (Austria) Dominik Wirlend	3	1
WC	(France) Benjamin Cselenko (France) Yann Renault	6	6
(New Zealand) Sebastian Lavie (Argentina) R Olivo	5	4
(Slovakia) F Horanský (Slovakia) J Kovalík	7	6
(Croatia) M Draganja (Croatia) D Marcan	5	6	[10]
3	(United States) T Sandgren (Guatemala) J Uriguen	7	4	[7]
6	(Germany) Dominik Schulz (Venezuela) D Souto	6	6^{4}	[12]
(Brazil) T Fernandes (Brazil) J Pereira	3	7	[10]
WC	(France) Antoine Escoffier (France) A Olivetti	4	6^{4}
(Argentina) F Arguello (Argentina) Kevin Konfederak	6	7
(France) P-H Herbert (Ukraine) Stanislav Poplavskyy	6^{4}	r
(Egypt) K-M Maamoun (South Africa) N Scholtz	7
(Switzerland) S Ehrat (United Kingdom) Ahmed El Menshawy	6^{2}	5
2	(France) G Mina (France) Julien Obry	7	7

Second round
5	(United States) E King (United States) D Kudla	6	6
WC	(France) B Cselenko (France) Y Renault	2	1
(Slovakia) F Horanský (Slovakia) J Kovalík	6	0	[5]
(Croatia) M Draganja (Croatia) D Marcan	4	6	[10]
6	(Germany) D Schulz (Venezuela) D Souto	6	3	[10]
(Argentina) F Arguello (Argentina) K Konfederak	3	6	[6]
(Egypt) K-M Maamoun (South Africa) N Scholtz	3	6	[10]
2	(France) G Mina (France) J Obry	6	1	[7]

Quarterfinals
5	(United States) E King (United States) D Kudla	0	6^{4}
(Croatia) M Draganja (Croatia) D Marcan	6	7
6	(Germany) D Schulz (Venezuela) D Souto	6	3	[10]
(Egypt) K-M Maamoun (South Africa) N Scholtz	1	6	[6]

Semifinals
(Croatia) M Draganja (Croatia) D Marcan	6	6
6	(Germany) D Schulz (Venezuela) D Souto	4	2
