= Korie Homan =

Dutch wheelchair tennis player

- Country (sports): Netherlands
- Residence: Nieuwleusen, Netherlands
- Born: 16 June 1986 (age 40) de Wijk, Netherlands
- Turned pro: 2003
- Retired: 2011
- Plays: Right Handed

Singles
- Career record: 192-85
- Highest ranking: No. 2 (19 November 2007)

Grand Slam singles results
- Australian Open: W (2010)
- French Open: F (2008, 2009)
- US Open: F (2005, 2009)

Other tournaments
- Masters: F (2007, 2008, 2009)
- Paralympic Games: Silver Medal (2008)

Doubles
- Career record: 142-59
- Highest ranking: No. 1 (27 July 2009)

Grand Slam doubles results
- Australian Open: W (2009)
- French Open: W (2009)
- Wimbledon: W (2009)
- US Open: W (2005, 2009)

Other doubles tournaments
- Masters Doubles: W (2005, 2009)
- Paralympic Games: Gold Medal (2008)
Medal record
Women's wheelchair tennis
Representing Netherlands
Paralympic Games
Gold medal – first place	2008 Beijing	Women's doubles
Silver medal – second place	2008 Beijing	Women's singles
- Last updated on: 9 December 2011.

Korie Homan (born 16 June 1986 in de Wijk) is a Dutch former wheelchair tennis player. Homan won the gold medal in women's doubles at the 2008 Paralympics. In 2009, she completed the doubles Grand Slam by winning the Australian, French, Wimbledon and US titles with Esther Vergeer. In addition Homan has also had individual success in Grand Slams when she won the 2010 Australian Open title. Homan is a two-time Masters doubles champion and a former world number one.

== Early life ==
Homan was born to Jan and Gina Willem. She is the youngest of three girls, with Geke and Wienke her older sisters. Homan was involved in a car accident in her first year of Senior school at the age of 12 in 1998. In 2003, when she finished school she had her leg amputated.

== Career ==
Homan started to play wheelchair tennis in May 2000. During her first year of learning she went to an exhibition by Esther Vergeer and had a conversation with her coach Aad Zwaan. In September 2001 Homan started on the juniors and played tournaments in the Netherlands.

Homan finished 2003 with a singles ranking of 23 having been unranked at the start of the year.

At the start of 2004 Homan was part of the Dutch team that claimed the Junior world team cup, in Christchurch, New Zealand. Homan followed this success up with a quarter final showing at the Australian Open, super series event. At the Czech Open Homan partnered Jiske Griffioen to second place in a five team round robin doubles tournament.

2006 started with Homan facing Esther Vergeer in the first round of the Wheelchair Classic 8's at the Australian Open. Homan lost a rain interrupted match in straight sets. Partnering Beth Arnoult-Ritthaler in the doubles, Homan reached the semifinal before losing to Vergeer and Griffioen. At the Belgium Open, Homan reached both finals, losing to Vergeer in the singles, but winning the doubles. In the final of the DaimlerChrysler Open Homan was whitewashed by Vergeer. In Italy at the Citta di Livorno Homan won both the singles and doubles titles. At the 2006 US Open Homan reached the final of the doubles competition where she lost to Smit. The Atlanta Open saw Homan lose the singles final to Vergeer, In the quarterfinals of the US Open Wheelchair Championships, Homan became the first player since 2004 to take a set of Esther Vergeer, in the quarterfinals as she lost in three sets. The doubles saw Homan reach the final with Smit. Homan finished in fifth place for the Singles Masters, and the runner up in the Doubles Masters with Shuker.

The 2007 season saw Homan be a losing singles finalist at Sydney, Pensacola, Jambes, Nottingham, Atlanta and the Masters.

2008 started with Homan losing both finals at the Australian Open. Homan then reached the final of the doubles in Sydney before the weather got the better of the tournament and left the final unplayed. At the Florida Open Homan could not stop Vergeer winning a seventh title as she lost in the final. Homan also reached the final of the doubles. The next week at the Pensacola Open Homan reached the final again playing Vergeer and took the first set, but could not consolidate and lost the final. While she also made the doubles final, where her team won just 2 games. Homan's team only won one more game in the final of the Japan Open. In the singles she met Vergeer in the final again, losing in two tight sets. At Roland Garros Homan reached the final where she was beaten by Vergeer who hit over twice the number of winners than what she managed. Homan also finished as a losing finalist in the doubles. Homan was then part of the team that retained the world team cup. At the Belgium Open Homan teamed up with Vergeer and won the title in three sets in the final. In the final of the singles Homan faced Vergeer again and lost in straight sets. Homan reached both finals at the British Open and lost them both. In the final of the Mercedes Open Homan played Vergeer and took the first set for the 4th time between the two, and for the first time it was by a double break. However Vergeer came back and defeated Homan and defeated her in the final of the doubles. Homan won her first title of the year in singles at the Swiss Open drafting Walraven in the final. Homan paired up with Walraven to claim the doubles as well. At the 2008 Summer Paralympics Homan reached the final where she played Vergeer. Homan held 2 match points to end Vergeer's 348 match winning streak. However Vergeer held on and Homan had to settle for silver. In the doubles Homan teamed up with Walraven. In the final they played Griffioen and Vergeer. They inflicted only for a second time a loss on Griffioen and Vergeer to claim the gold medal. At the Masters Vergeer and Homan reached the final again. For the third successive time the match went to a final set. Unlike Beijing the final set was one sided as Vergeer ran out the winner.

In the final of the first Grand Slam of the year Homan stormed into a 4–0 against Vergeer in the first set before losing six games in a row. Homan then jumped into a 2–0 lead at the start of the second before losing six games in a row again and the match. Homan partnered Vergeer in the doubles as they won their first Grand Slam title as a partnership Homan then traveled to Sydney where she won her first Sydney International Open singles title defeating Jiske Griffioen in the final. In the final of the singles at the Pensacola Open Homan defeated Gravellier 7–1 in a final-set tiebreaker to win her second ITF 1 series title of the year. Gravellier also took Homan to three sets in the doubles, but Homan alongside van Koot won the decider. At Roland Garros Homan and Vergeer claimed the doubles title before having a rematch of their 2008 singles final. Vergeer defeated Homan in straight sets. Homan and Vergeer went on to create history by becoming the first team to win the Wimbledon Championships. At the British Open Super Series event, Homan lost in a rain interrupted final to Vergeer in straight sets, before teaming up with Vergeer to take the doubles. Homan was again part of the team which won the World Team Cup, defeating Great Britain in the final. Homan reached the singles and doubles final of the Mercedes Open. Homan took Vergeer to a final set for the first time in 2009, before losing. However Homan gained revenge as she teamed up with Griffioen to beat Vergeer and Smit, in three sets. The US Open USTA Wheelchair Championships saw Homan reach both finals again. She won the doubles with Griffioen, but faced Vergeer for the 41st time Homan and Vergeer went to the final set for the 6th time in the last two years and the eighth time in all 41 meetings between the two. Homan did not start well losing the first set 6–0. However Homan improved to take the second before falling away in the final set. At the US Open Homan defeated di Toro and Walraven to reach the final. Upon reaching the final of the singles, Homan played Vergeer who inflicted a double bagal (6–0, 6–0) win for the second time in their 42 match series. However Homan partnered Vergeer in the doubles and the pair won the title to complete the Grand Slam as a team. Homan qualified for the Singles Masters after making the final of every tournament she entered since February. She reached the final where she played Vergeer. Homan was a set and 5–2 up in the second set tiebreak, just two points away from ending Vergeer's streak of 382 matches undefeated. Unfortunately for Homan, Vergeer won the next five points to take the tiebreaker 7–5 and then won the final set 6–3. Homan also qualified for the doubles masters partnering Vergeer after winning five titles as a team including the Grand Slam. The pair lost their only set as a partnership in 2009 in their second match, but went on to claim the title. Homan was named the female player of the year for 2009 as she polled 44% of the vote ahead of joint second-placed finishers di Toro and Vergeer.

In the absence of Vergeer, Homan took full advantage as she won her first Grand Slam singles title at the 2010 Australian Open. Homan has not played since her Australian Open win as in September 2009 she fell, which resulted in her tearing the ligaments in her wrist. Surgery was not an option as this would result in Homan losing function of her wrist This made her pull out of the doubles of the Australian Open. In July 2010 Homan announced her retirement from the sport due to the injury.

== Outside of tennis ==
Homan has a degree in biomedical science. As of September 2010, she is studying veterinary medicine.

== Major finals ==
=== Grand Slam singles finals: 7 (1 title, 6 runner-ups) ===
Outcome	Year	Championship	Surface	Opponent	Score
Runner-up	2005	US Open	Hard	Esther Vergeer	2–6, 1–6
Runner-up	2008	Australian Open	Hard	Esther Vergeer	3–6, 3–6
Runner-up	2008	French Open	Clay	Esther Vergeer	2–6, 2–6
Runner-up	2009	Australian Open	Hard	Esther Vergeer	4–6, 2–6
Runner-up	2009	French Open	Clay	Esther Vergeer	2–6, 5–7
Runner-up	2009	US Open	Hard	Esther Vergeer	0–6, 0–6
Winner	2010	Australian Open	Hard	Florence Gravellier	6–2, 6–2

=== Grand Slam doubles finals: 10 (5 titles, 5 runner-ups) ===
Outcome	Year	Championship	Surface	Partner	Opponent	Score
Winner	2005	US Open	Hard	Esther Vergeer	Beth Ann Arnoult; Jan Proctor	6–3, 6–1
Runner-up	2006	US Open	Hard	Maaike Smit	Jiske Griffioen; Esther Vergeer	4–6, 4–6
Runner-up	2007	Australian Open	Hard	Florence Gravellier	Jiske Griffioen; Esther Vergeer	0–6, 6–3, [6–10]
Runner-up	2007	US Open	Hard	Sharon Walraven	Jiske Griffioen; Esther Vergeer	1–6, 1–6
Runner-up	2008	Australian Open	Hard	Sharon Walraven	Jiske Griffioen; Esther Vergeer	3–6, 1–6
Runner-up	2008	French Open	Clay	Sharon Walraven	Jiske Griffioen; Esther Vergeer	4–6, 4–6
Winner	2009	Australian Open	Hard	Esther Vergeer	Agnieszka Wysocka; Katharina Krüger	6–1, 6–0
Winner	2009	French Open	Clay	Esther Vergeer	Annick Sevenans; Aniek van Koot	6–2, 6–3
Winner	2009	Wimbledon	Grass	Esther Vergeer	Daniela di Toro; Lucy Shuker	6–1, 6–3
Winner	2009	US Open	Hard	Esther Vergeer	Daniela di Toro; Florence Gravellier	6–2, 6–2

=== Singles Masters finals: 3 (3 runner-ups) ===
Outcome	Year	City	Surface	Opponent	Score
Runner-up	2007	Amsterdam	Hard	Esther Vergeer	3–6, 4–6
Runner-up	2008	Amsterdam	Hard	Esther Vergeer	2–6, 6–3, 0–6
Runner-up	2009	Amsterdam	Hard	Esther Vergeer	6–2, 6–7^{(5–7)}, 2–6

=== Doubles Masters finals: 3 (2 titles, 1 runner-up) ===
Outcome	Year	City	Surface	Partner	Opponent	Score
Winner	2004	Brescia	Hard	Jiske Griffioen	Brigitte Ameryckx; Sharon Walraven	6–4, 6–2
Runner-up	2007	Bergamo	Hard	Maaike Smit	Jiske Griffioen; Esther Vergeer	Round Robin
Winner	2009	Bergamo	Hard	Esther Vergeer	Jiske Griffioen; Aniek van Koot	7–6^{(7–2)}, 6–4

=== Paralympic singles finals: 1 (1 runner-up) ===
Outcome	Year	City	Surface	Opponent	Score
Runner-up	2008	Beijing	Hard	(Netherlands) Esther Vergeer	2–6, 6–4, 6–7^{(5–7)}

=== Paralympic doubles finals: 1 (1 title) ===
Outcome	Year	City	Surface	Partner	Opponent	Score
Winner	2008	Beijing	Hard	(Netherlands) Sharon Walraven	(Netherlands) Jiske Griffioen (Netherlands) Esther Vergeer	2–6, 7–6^{(7–4)}, 6–4

== Performance timelines ==
Key
W	F	SF	QF	#R	RR	Q#	DNQ	A	NH

(W) winner; (F) finalist; (SF) semifinalist; (QF) quarterfinalist; (#R) rounds 4, 3, 2, 1; (RR) round-robin stage; (Q#) qualification round; (DNQ) did not qualify; (A) absent; (NH) not held; (SR) strike rate (events won / competed); (W–L) win–loss record.

=== Wheelchair singles ===
Tournament	2008	2009	2010	Career SR
Australian Open	F	F	W	1 / 3
French Open	F	F	A	0 / 2
Wimbledon	NH	NH	NH	0 / 0
US Open	NH	F	A	0 / 1

=== Wheelchair doubles ===
Tournament	2008	2009	2010	Career SR
Australian Open	F	W	SF	1 / 3
French Open	F	W	A	1 / 2
Wimbledon	NH	W	A	1 / 1
US Open	NH	W	A	1 / 1

Preceded by Jiske Griffioen / Esther Vergeer	Year End Number 1 – Doubles Award; 2009	Succeeded by Sharon Walraven
Preceded by Aniek van Koot	Female Player of the Year; 2009	Succeeded by Sabine Ellerbrock
