= 2009 French Open – Boys' singles =

Boys' singles
- 2009 French Open

Final
- Champion: (Sweden) Daniel Berta
- Runner-up: (France) Gianni Mina
- Score: 6–1, 3–6, 6–3

Events
Singles	men	women		boys	girls
Doubles	men	women	mixed	boys	girls
WC Singles	men	women	quad
WC Doubles	men	women	quad
Legends	−45	45+	women
← 2008 ·	French Open	· 2010 →

Yang Tsung-hua was the defending champion, but did not compete in the Juniors this year.

Daniel Berta won in the final 6–1, 3–6, 6–3, against Gianni Mina.

== Seeds ==
1. (Chinese Taipei) Huang Liang-chi (first round)
2. (Australia) Bernard Tomic (third round)
3. (Argentina) Andrea Collarini (quarterfinals)
4. (Japan) Shuichi Sekiguchi (second round)
5. (Guatemala) Julen Uriguen (first round)
6. (France) Julien Obry (first round)
7. (United States) Denis Kudla (first round)
8. (Chinese Taipei) Hsieh Cheng-peng (first round)
9. (Argentina) Facundo Arguello (first round)
10. (Argentina) Agustín Velotti (third round)
11. (France) Gianni Mina (final)
12. (Venezuela) David Souto (third round)
13. (United States) Tennys Sandgren (third round)
14. (Germany) Dominik Schulz (semifinals)
15. (Brazil) José Pereira (second round)
16. (Belgium) Yannik Reuter (third round)

== Draw ==
=== Key ===
- Q = Qualifier
- WC = Wild card
- LL = Lucky loser
- Alt = Alternate
- SE = Special exempt
- PR = Protected ranking
- ITF = ITF entry
- JE = Junior exempt
- w/o = Walkover
- r = Retired
- d = Defaulted
- SR = Special ranking

=== Final eight ===
Quarterfinals
(Germany) Richard Becker	3	3
(Sweden) Daniel Berta	6	6
(Finland) Henri Laaksonen	6	6
(Slovakia) Filip Horanský	3	4
11	(France) Gianni Mina	1	6	6
3	(Argentina) Andrea Collarini	6	2	3
(Brazil) Guilherme Clézar	6	5	4
14	(Germany) Dominik Schulz	4	7	6

Semifinals
(Sweden) Daniel Berta	6	7
(Finland) Henri Laaksonen	4	5
11	(France) Gianni Mina	7	6
14	(Germany) Dominik Schulz	6^{4}	2

Final
(Sweden) Daniel Berta	6	3	6
11	(France) Gianni Mina	1	6	3

=== Top half ===
==== Section 1 ====
First round
1	(Chinese Taipei) Huang Liang-chi	6	6^{6}	3
(Germany) Richard Becker	1	7	6
WC	(France) Cedrick Commin	5	1
Q	(Brazil) Tiago Fernandes	7	6
(Croatia) Marin Draganja	6	6
(Argentina) Kevin Konfederak	4	2
(Ukraine) Stanislav Poplavskyy	0	3
13	(United States) Tennys Sandgren	6	6
9	(Argentina) Facundo Arguello	6	2	1
(Sweden) Daniel Berta	3	6	6
WC	(France) Constantin Belot	4	2
(Spain) Pablo Carreño Busta	6	6
(Italy) Federico Gaio	6	6
(United States) Evan King	4	4
(Russia) Andrey Kuznetsov	7	6
6	(France) Julien Obry	5	2

Second round
(Germany) R Becker	6	5	6
Q	(Brazil) T Fernandes	3	7	3
(Croatia) M Draganja	3	2
13	(United States) T Sandgren	6	6
(Sweden) D Berta	7	6
(Spain) P Carreño Busta	6^{3}	3
(Italy) F Gaio	4	6	6
(Russia) A Kuznetsov	6	4	4

Third round
(Germany) R Becker	6	6
13	(United States) T Sandgren	4	3
(Sweden) D Berta	6	6
(Italy) F Gaio	4	4

Quarterfinals
(Germany) R Becker	3	3
(Sweden) D Berta	6	6

==== Section 2 ====
First round
4	(Japan) Shuichi Sekiguchi	4	6	6
(Austria) Dominik Wirlend	6	4	2
WC	(France) Antoine Escoffier	5	4
(Finland) Henri Laaksonen	7	6
Q	(Argentina) Renzo Olivo	6	6
Q	(United States) Jordan Cox	3	3
(France) Pierre-Hugues Herbert	2	7	1
15	(Brazil) José Pereira	6	6^{5}	6
12	(Venezuela) David Souto	6	6
WC	(France) Yann Renault	4	0
(Greece) Alexandros Georgoudas	6	1	6
(Belgium) Arthur De Greef	1	6	4
(Slovakia) Filip Horanský	6^{5}	6	8
(United States) Mitchell Frank	7	4	6
Q	(New Zealand) Sebastian Lavie	3	6	7
5	(Guatemala) Julen Urigüen	6	4	5

Second round
4	(Japan) S Sekiguchi	6	0	3
(Finland) H Laaksonen	4	6	6
Q	(Argentina) R Olivo	6	4	9
15	(Brazil) J Pereira	4	6	7
12	(Venezuela) D Souto	5	6	7
(Greece) A Georgoudas	7	4	5
(Slovakia) F Horanský	7	6
Q	(New Zealand) S Lavie	6^{5}	2

Third round
(Finland) H Laaksonen	6	6
Q	(Argentina) R Olivo	3	0
12	(Venezuela) D Souto	4	4
(Slovakia) F Horanský	6	6

Quarterfinals
(Finland) H Laaksonen	6	6
(Slovakia) F Horanský	3	4

=== Bottom half ===
==== Section 3 ====
First round
8	(Chinese Taipei) Hsieh Cheng-peng	5	6	2
(Russia) Mikhail Biryukov	7	3	6
Q	(Sweden) Patrik Brydolf	1	6	6
(France) Benjamin Cselenko	6	4	2
(New Zealand) Riki McLachlan	4	2
Q	(Germany) Kevin Krawietz	6	6
(United States) Devin Britton	0	4
11	(France) Gianni Mina	6	6
16	(Belgium) Yannik Reuter	6	6
(Slovakia) Jozef Kovalík	4	1
WC	(France) Romain Arneodo	1	3
(United States) Harry Fowler	6	6
(South Africa) Nicolaas Scholtz	6	7
Q	(Ecuador) Emilio Gómez	2	6^{2}
(Czech Republic) Radim Urbanek	5	4
3	(Argentina) Andrea Collarini	7	6

Second round
(Russia) M Biryukov	6	4	6
Q	(Sweden) P Brydolf	2	6	8
Q	(Germany) K Krawietz	7	2	6
11	(France) G Mina	5	6	8
16	(Belgium) Y Reuter	6	6
(United States) H Fowler	3	3
(South Africa) N Scholtz	1	6^{2}
3	(Argentina) A Collarini	6	7

Third round
Q	(Sweden) P Brydolf	6^{7}	6	2
11	(France) G Mina	7	2	6
16	(Belgium) Y Reuter	4	1
3	(Argentina) A Collarini	6	6

Quarterfinals
11	(France) G Mina	1	6	6
3	(Argentina) A Collarini	6	2	3

==== Section 4 ====
First round
7	(United States) Denis Kudla	4	0
(Brazil) Guilherme Clézar	6	6
(Japan) Hiroyasu Ehara	2	2
WC	(France) Tak Khunn Wang	6	6
(Egypt) Karim-Mohamed Maamoun	4	2
(Spain) Carlos Boluda-Purkiss	6	6
(Philippines) Francis Casey Alcantara	6^{1}	4
10	(Argentina) Agustín Velotti	7	6
14	(Germany) Dominik Schulz	6	6
(Croatia) Dino Marcan	4	2
LL	(Italy) Emanuele Molina	6	3	6
(Switzerland) Sandro Ehrat	4	6	3
(United States) Alexander Domijan	6^{1}	6	6
WC	(France) Mick Lescure	7	1	1
Q	(Belarus) Andrei Vasilevski	4	2
2	(Australia) Bernard Tomic	6	6

Second round
(Brazil) G Clézar	3	6	6
WC	(France) TK Wang	6	3	4
(Spain) C Boluda-Purkiss	4	4
10	(Argentina) A Velotti	6	6
14	(Germany) D Schulz	6	6
LL	(Italy) E Molina	2	2
(United States) A Domijan	5	3
2	(Australia) B Tomic	7	6

Third round
(Brazil) G Clézar	6	6
10	(Argentina) A Velotti	3	2
14	(Germany) D Schulz	7	7
2	(Australia) B Tomic	6^{2}	6^{6}

Quarterfinals
(Brazil) G Clézar	6	5	4
14	(Germany) D Schulz	4	7	6
