= 2008 French Open – Girls' singles =

Girls' singles
- 2008 French Open

Final
- Champion: (Romania) Simona Halep
- Runner-up: (Romania) Elena Bogdan
- Score: 6–4, 6–7^{(3–7)}, 6–2

Events
Singles	men	women		boys	girls
Doubles	men	women	mixed	boys	girls
WC Singles	men	women	quad
WC Doubles	men	women	quad
Legends	−45	45+	women
← 2007 ·	French Open	· 2009 →

Simona Halep defeated Elena Bogdan in the final, 6–4, 6–7^{(3–7)}, 6–2 to win the girls' singles tennis title at the 2008 French Open. Halep would go on to win the women's title for her first major title ten years later.

Alizé Cornet was the defending champion, but chose to compete in the women's singles competition where as the 19th seed, she reached the third round before losing to 14th seed Agnieszka Radwańska.

== Seeds ==
1. (United States) Melanie Oudin (quarterfinals)
2. (Netherlands) Arantxa Rus (semifinals)
3. (Thailand) Noppawan Lertcheewakarn (third round)
4. (Romania) Ana Bogdan (first round)
5. (Australia) Jessica Moore (third round)
6. (Slovenia) Polona Hercog (quarterfinals)
7. (Serbia) Bojana Jovanovski (third round)
8. (Japan) Kurumi Nara (first round)
9. (Romania) Simona Halep (champion)
10. (Romania) Elena Bogdan (final)
11. (Austria) Nikola Hofmanova (third round)
12. (Australia) Johanna Konta (first round)
13. (Russia) Ksenia Lykina (quarterfinals)
14. (Indonesia) Jessy Rompies (first round)
15. (Russia) Elena Chernyakova (first round)
16. (Poland) Katarzyna Piter (first round)

== Draw ==
=== Key ===
- Q = Qualifier
- WC = Wild card
- LL = Lucky loser
- Alt = Alternate
- SE = Special exempt
- PR = Protected ranking
- ITF = ITF entry
- JE = Junior exempt
- w/o = Walkover
- r = Retired
- d = Defaulted
- SR = Special ranking

=== Finals ===
Quarterfinals
1	(United States) Melanie Oudin	4	4
10	(Romania) Elena Bogdan	6	6
(France) Nathalie Mohn	2	1
Q	(Slovakia) Lenka Juríková	6	6
9	(Romania) Simona Halep	6	6
13	(Russia) Ksenia Lykina	1	2
6	(Slovenia) Polona Hercog	6	1	3
2	(Netherlands) Arantxa Rus	3	6	6

Semifinals
10	(Romania) Elena Bogdan	7	4	6
Q	(Slovakia) Lenka Juríková	5	6	4
9	(Romania) Simona Halep	6	7
2	(Netherlands) Arantxa Rus	3	5

Final
10	(Romania) Elena Bogdan	4	7	2
9	(Romania) Simona Halep	6	6^{3}	6

=== Top half ===
==== Section 1 ====
First round
1	(United States) M Oudin	6	6
LL	(Russia) V Savinykh	0	1
(United Kingdom) J Curtis	6^{6}	6	6
WC	(France) A Hesse	7	2	4
(France) C Chala	6	6^{7}	4
(Ukraine) N Kichenok	1	7	6
(Italy) A Grymalska	7	6
14	(Indonesia) J Rompies	6^{6}	1
10	(Romania) E Bogdan	6	6
(Germany) L Berlinecke	2	3
(Netherlands) L Kerkhove	3	4
(Hong Kong) Z-j Yang	6	6
(Japan) A Yamasoto	6	3	3
(Hungary) R-L Jani	0	6	6
(France) C Sapene	2	5
7	(Serbia) B Jovanovski	6	7

Second round
1	(United States) M Oudin	6	6
(United Kingdom) J Curtis	1	1
(Ukraine) N Kichenok	3	2
(Italy) A Grymalska	6	6
10	(Romania) E Bogdan	6	6
(Hong Kong) Z-j Yang	1	3
(Hungary) R-L Jani	1	4
7	(Serbia) B Jovanovski	6	6

Third round
1	(United States) M Oudin	6	6
(Italy) A Grymalska	3	0
10	(Romania) E Bogdan	1	7	8
7	(Serbia) B Jovanovski	6	5	6

Quarterfinals
1	(United States) M Oudin	4	4
10	(Romania) E Bogdan	6	6

==== Section 2 ====
First round
4	(Romania) A Bogdan	4	6	8
(Netherlands) R Hogenkamp	6	3	10
(Canada) R Marino	6	6
(Morocco) N Lalami	3	3
Q	(Hungary) Z Susányi	4	7	1
Q	(Switzerland) N Riner	6	6^{8}	6
WC	(France) N Mohn	6	6
15	(Russia) E Chernyakova	2	3
12	(Australia) J Konta	4	5
WC	(France) J Gervais	6	7
(Poland) S Zaniewska	7	7
(Ukraine) L Kychenok	5	5
Q	(Peru) B Botto	6	1	6
(Russia) M Sirotkina	4	6	3
Q	(Slovakia) L Juríková	6	2	7
8	(Japan) K Nara	2	6	5

Second round
(Netherlands) R Hogenkamp	3	6	6
(Canada) R Marino	6	1	4
Q	(Switzerland) N Riner	5	2	r
WC	(France) N Mohn	7	2
WC	(France) J Gervais	2	6	7
(Poland) S Zaniewska	6	2	9
Q	(Peru) B Botto	6	1	0^{r}
Q	(Slovakia) L Juríková	4	6	3

Third round
(Netherlands) R Hogenkamp	2	4
WC	(France) N Mohn	6	6
(Poland) S Zaniewska	4	2
Q	(Slovakia) L Juríková	6	6

Quarterfinals
WC	(France) N Mohn	2	1
Q	(Slovakia) L Juríková	6	6

=== Bottom half ===
==== Section 3 ====
First round
5	(Australia) J Moore	6	6
(Japan) M Inoue	0	2
WC	(France) A Goncalves	6^{10}	3
(Argentina) A Salut	7	6
Q	(Denmark) K Barbat	6	2	6
(Russia) V Kamenskaya	2	6	2
WC	(France) C Rodier	4	1
9	(Romania) S Halep	6	6
13	(Russia) K Lykina	2	7	8
(Slovakia) K Boczová	6	6^{6}	6
(Kazakhstan) Z Diyas	6	2	9
(Romania) I-C Begu	2	6	7
(Hungary) T Babos	6	6
WC	(France) C Sibille	3	2
(South Africa) M Gorny	4	3
3	(Thailand) N Lertcheewakarn	6	6

Second round
5	(Australia) J Moore	7	6
(Argentina) A Salut	5	3
Q	(Denmark) K Barbat	3	1
9	(Romania) S Halep	6	6
13	(Russia) K Lykina	6	6
(Kazakhstan) Z Diyas	3	4
(Hungary) T Babos	5	5
3	(Thailand) N Lertcheewakarn	7	7

Third round
5	(Australia) J Moore	0	1
9	(Romania) S Halep	6	6
13	(Russia) K Lykina	6	6
3	(Thailand) N Lertcheewakarn	4	1

Quarterfinals
9	(Romania) S Halep	6	6
13	(Russia) K Lykina	1	2

==== Section 4 ====
First round
6	(Slovenia) P Hercog	6	7
LL	(Ukraine) M Malkhasyan	3	5
(India) P Venkatesh	0	1
(Belarus) A Orlik	6	6
(Russia) V Solovieva	6	7
WC	(France) C Babet	4	6^{7}
(Uzbekistan) A Kolesnichenko	6	3	4
11	(Austria) N Hofmanova	4	6	6
16	(Poland) K Piter	6	3	4
(France) K Mladenovic	2	6	6
(Slovakia) Z Luknárová	1	6	2
(Czech Republic) Z Linhová	6	4	6
(United States) M Burdette	6	6
Q	(Japan) M Doi	2	4
(Romania) A Damaschin	5	3
2	(Netherlands) A Rus	7	6

Second round
6	(Slovenia) P Hercog	6	6
(Belarus) A Orlik	1	3
(Russia) V Solovieva
11	(Austria) N Hofmanova	w/o
(France) K Mladenovic	7	6
(Czech Republic) Z Linhová	5	2
(United States) M Burdette	3	1
2	(Netherlands) A Rus	6	6

Third round
6	(Slovenia) P Hercog	6	7
11	(Austria) N Hofmanova	1	6^{6}
(France) K Mladenovic	1	3
2	(Netherlands) A Rus	6	6

Quarterfinals
6	(Slovenia) P Hercog	6	1	3
2	(Netherlands) A Rus	3	6	6
