= 2008 French Open – Boys' singles =

Boys' singles
- 2008 French Open

Final
- Champion: (Chinese Taipei) Tsung-hua Yang
- Runner-up: (Poland) Jerzy Janowicz
- Score: 6–3, 7–6(5)

Events
Singles	men	women		boys	girls
Doubles	men	women	mixed	boys	girls
WC Singles	men	women	quad
WC Doubles	men	women	quad
Legends	−45	45+	women
← 2007 ·	French Open	· 2009 →

The 2008 French Open boys' singles tournament was an event during the 2008 French Open tennis tournament. Vladimir Ignatic was the defending champion, but did not compete in the Juniors in this year.

Tsung-hua Yang won in the final 6–3, 7–6(5), against Jerzy Janowicz.

== Seeds ==
1. (Australia) Bernard Tomic (quarterfinals)
2. (Mexico) César Ramírez (semifinals)
3. (France) Jonathan Eysseric (third round)
4. (India) Yuki Bhambri (first round)
5. (Brazil) Henrique Cunha (second round)
6. (Brazil) José Pereira (second round)
7. (El Salvador) Marcelo Arévalo (first round)
8. (Argentina) Juan Vázquez-Valenzuela (first round)
9. (United States) Ryan Harrison (third round)
10. (Russia) Alexei Grigorov (first round)
11. (Germany) Cedrik-Marcel Stebe (first round)
12. (Poland) Jerzy Janowicz (final)
13. (Thailand) Peerakit Siributwong (first round)
14. (Bulgaria) Grigor Dimitrov (quarterfinals)
15. (Belgium) Alexandre Folie (first round)
16. (Belgium) David Goffin (second round)

== Draw ==
=== Key ===
- Q = Qualifier
- WC = Wild card
- LL = Lucky loser
- Alt = Alternate
- SE = Special exempt
- PR = Protected ranking
- ITF = ITF entry
- JE = Junior exempt
- w/o = Walkover
- r = Retired
- d = Defaulted
- SR = Special ranking

=== Final eight ===
Quarterfinals
1	(Australia) Bernard Tomic	6^{2}	3
Q	(Argentina) Guido Pella	7	6
14	(Bulgaria) Grigor Dimitrov	4	6	3
12	(Poland) Jerzy Janowicz	6	3	6
(Russia) Evgeny Donskoy	6	3	6
(Chinese Taipei) Tsung-hua Yang	4	6	8
(South Korea) Soong-jae Cho	4	1
2	(Mexico) César Ramírez	6	6

Semifinals
Q	(Argentina) Guido Pella	4	4
12	(Poland) Jerzy Janowicz	6	6
(Chinese Taipei) Tsung-hua Yang	7	6
2	(Mexico) César Ramírez	5	4

Final
12	(Poland) Jerzy Janowicz	3	6^{5}
(Chinese Taipei) Tsung-hua Yang	6	7

=== Top half ===
==== Section 1 ====
First round
1	(Australia) Bernard Tomic	6	6
(Serbia) Ilija Vucic	3	4
WC	(France) Nassim Slilam	3	7	9
(Slovenia) Borut Puc	6	6^{2}	7
(Germany) Jaan-Frederik Brunken	6	6
(United States) Bradley Klahn	2	2
(Indonesia) Christopher Rungkat	0	3
16	(Belgium) David Goffin	6	6
10	(Russia) Alexei Grigorov	4	5
(Australia) Andrew Thomas	6	7
(Canada) Vasek Pospisil	2	7	6
Q	(Dominican Republic) José Hernández	6	6^{5}	4
Q	(Argentina) Guido Pella	6	6
Q	(United Kingdom) Thomas Knights	0	1
WC	(France) François-Arthur Vibert	6	6
7	(El Salvador) Marcelo Arévalo	3	0

Second round
1	(Australia) B Tomic	6	4	6
WC	(France) N Slilam	4	6	0
(Germany) J-F Brunken	7	6
16	(Belgium) D Goffin	6^{6}	1
(Australia) A Thomas	7	6
(Canada) V Pospisil	6^{4}	4
Q	(Argentina) G Pella	6	6
WC	(France) F-A Vibert	2	3

Third round
1	(Australia) B Tomic	6	6
(Germany) J-F Brunken	0	3
(Australia) A Thomas	0	4
Q	(Argentina) G Pella	6	6

Quarterfinals
1	(Australia) B Tomic	6^{2}	3
Q	(Argentina) G Pella	7	6

==== Section 2 ====
First round
3	(France) Jonathan Eysseric	6	6
(United States) Chase Buchanan	0	2
(Chile) Cristóbal Saavedra Corvalán	4	6	6
(China) Wu Di	6	2	3
(Finland) Henri Kontinen	2	6^{4}
(United Kingdom) Marcus Willis	6	7
Q	(Belgium) Yannik Reuter	3	2
14	(Bulgaria) Grigor Dimitrov	6	6
12	(Poland) Jerzy Janowicz	6	2
(Russia) Alexander Lobkov	1	0	r
(Croatia) Marin Draganja	6	7
WC	(France) Julien Obry	3	6^{3}
WC	(France) Antoine Feret	7	6
(Thailand) Kittiphong Wachiramanowong	6^{8}	4
(Australia) Jared Easton	6^{0}	6	3
5	(Brazil) Henrique Cunha	7	4	6

Second round
3	(France) J Eysseric	6	6
(Chile) C Saavedra-Corvalán	2	2
(United Kingdom) M Willis	1	3
14	(Bulgaria) G Dimitrov	6	6
12	(Poland) J Janowicz	6	6
(Croatia) M Draganja	4	4
WC	(France) A Feret	6	4	7
5	(Brazil) H Cunha	4	6	5

Third round
3	(France) J Eysseric	3	4
14	(Bulgaria) G Dimitrov	6	6
12	(Poland) J Janowicz	6^{3}	7	7
WC	(France) A Feret	7	5	5

Quarterfinals
14	(Bulgaria) G Dimitrov	4	'6	3
12	(Poland) J Janowicz	6	3	6

=== Bottom half ===
==== Section 3 ====
First round
8	(Argentina) Juan Vázquez-Valenzuela	7	3	2
(United Kingdom) Daniel Evans	6^{3}	6	6
(Russia) Evgeny Donskoy	7	3	6
WC	(France) Axel Michon	6^{7}	6	3
(Bosnia and Herzegovina) Mirza Bašić	6	5	4
(Serbia) Filip Krajinović-Piskovic	1	7	6
(Australia) Mark Verryth	7	6
11	(Germany) Cedrik-Marcel Stebe	5	4
15	(Belgium) Alexandre Folie	4	5
(Chinese Taipei) Tsung-hua Yang	6	7
(Zimbabwe) Takanyi Garanganga	7	6
WC	(France) Constantin Belot	6^{5}	3
Q	(Romania) Marius Copil	6	6
(United States) Jarmere Jenkins	3	3
(France) Guillaume Rufin	6	6
4	(India) Yuki Bhambri	2	1

Second round
(United Kingdom) D Evans	5	4
(Russia) E Donskoy	7	6
(Serbia) F Krajinovic-Piskovic	6	6
(Australia) M Verryth	2	4
(Chinese Taipei) T-h Yang	6	2	9
(Zimbabwe) T Garanganga	3	6	7
Q	(Romania) M Copil	1	2
(France) G Rufin	6	6

Third round
(Russia) E Donskoy	6	4	6
(Serbia) F Krajinovic-Piskovic	2	6	3
(Chinese Taipei) T-h Yang	6	7
(France) G Rufin	3	5

Quarterfinals
(Russia) E Donskoy	6	3	6
(Chinese Taipei) T-h Yang	4	6	8

==== Section 4 ====
First round
6	(Brazil) José Pereira	6	6
WC	(France) Adrien Puget	3	4
(South Korea) Soong-jae Cho	6	2	6
(United Kingdom) Daniel Cox	3	6	4
WC	(France) Tak Khunn Wang	1	0
Q	(Russia) Andrey Kuznetsov	6	6
(Canada) Milos Raonic	6^{5}	6	3
9	(United States) Ryan Harrison	7	2	6
13	(Thailand) Peerakit Siributwong	5	0
Q	(Austria) Nikolaus Moser	7	6
(France) Jérôme Inzerillo	6	6
(Italy) Giacomo Miccini	2	4
(Australia) Matt Reid	6	6^{3}	0
Q	(United Kingdom) Daniel Smethurst	4	7	6
(Japan) Tadayuki Longhi	0	1
2	(Mexico) César Ramírez	6	6

Second round
6	(Brazil) J Pereira	2	3
(South Korea) S-j Cho	6	6
Q	(Russia) A Kuznetsov	7	3	7
9	(United States) R Harrison	5	6	9
Q	(Austria) N Moser	7	4
(France) J Inzerrillo	6^{5}	3	r
Q	(United Kingdom) D Smethurst	4	6	5
2	(Mexico) C Ramírez	6	3	7

Third round
(South Korea) S-j Cho	3	6	6
9	(United States) R Harrison	6	3	1
Q	(Austria) N Moser	2	0
2	(Mexico) C Ramírez	6	6

Quarterfinals
(South Korea) Soong-jae Cho	4	1
2	(Mexico) C Ramírez	6	6
