= 2009 French Open – Mixed doubles =

Mixed doubles
- 2009 French Open

Final
- Champions: (United States) Liezel Huber (United States) Bob Bryan
- Runners-up: (United States) Vania King (Brazil) Marcelo Melo
- Score: 5–7, 7–6^{(7–5)}, 10–7

Details
- Draw: 32
- Seeds: 8

Events
Singles	men	women		boys	girls
Doubles	men	women	mixed	boys	girls
WC Singles	men	women	quad
WC Doubles	men	women	quad
Legends	−45	45+	women
- French Open

Defending champion Bob Bryan and his partner Liezel Huber defeated Vania King and Marcelo Melo in the final, 5–7, 7–6^{(7–5)}, 10–7 to win the mixed doubles tennis title at the 2009 French Open.

Victoria Azarenka and Bryan were the reigning champions, but Azarenka chose not to participate.

== Seeds ==
1. (United States) Liezel Huber / (United States) Bob Bryan (champions)
2. (Zimbabwe) Cara Black / (India) Leander Paes (second round)
3. (United States) Lisa Raymond / (Poland) Marcin Matkowski (second round)
4. (Russia) Nadia Petrova / (Belarus) Max Mirnyi (semifinals)
5. (Japan) Ai Sugiyama / (Brazil) André Sá (quarterfinals)
6. (Russia) Elena Vesnina / (Canada) Daniel Nestor (second round)
7. (China) Yan Zi / (Serbia) Nenad Zimonjić (first round)
8. (Spain) Virginia Ruano Pascual / (Australia) Stephen Huss (first round)

== Draw ==
Key

- Q = Qualifier
- WC = Wild card
- LL = Lucky loser
- Alt = Alternate
- ITF = ITF entry
- PR = Protected ranking
- SR = Special ranking
- SE = Special exempt
- JE = Junior exempt
- JR = Junior Accelerator Programme entrant
- CO = College Accelerator Programme entrant
- NG = Next Gen Accelerator Program entrant
- w/o = Walkover
- r = Retired
- d = Defaulted

=== Finals ===
Semifinals
1	(United States) Liezel Huber (United States) Bob Bryan	6	6
(Germany) Anna-Lena Grönefeld (The Bahamas) Mark Knowles	2	2
4	(Russia) Nadia Petrova (Belarus) Max Mirnyi	2	6	[7]
(United States) Vania King (Brazil) Marcelo Melo	6	3	[10]

Final
1	(United States) Liezel Huber (United States) Bob Bryan	5	7	[10]
(United States) Vania King (Brazil) Marcelo Melo	7	6^{5}	[7]

=== Top half ===
First round
1	(United States) L Huber (United States) B Bryan	7	6
(United States) B Mattek-Sands (Zimbabwe) K Ullyett	6^{6}	3
(Italy) F Pennetta (Serbia) D Vemić	7	6
(Czech Republic) K Peschke (Czech Republic) F Čermák	5	1
WC	(France) P Parmentier (France) M Gicquel	6	6
Alt	(Czech Republic) V Uhlířová (Czech Republic) L Friedl	4	3
WC	(France) A Védy (France) J Ouanna	3	3
5	(Japan) A Sugiyama (Brazil) A Sá	6	6
3	(United States) L Raymond (Poland) M Matkowski	6	6
(Australia) R Stubbs (United Kingdom) R Hutchins	2	2
(Germany) A-L Grönefeld (The Bahamas) M Knowles	6	6
(Czech Republic) I Benešová (Czech Republic) L Dlouhý	3	4
Alt	(Australia) A Rodionova (South Africa) R de Voest	6	3	[11]
(Kazakhstan) Y Shvedova (Australia) J Kerr	1	6	[9]
(Russia) A Kleybanova (Brazil) B Soares	7	4	[12]
7	(China) Z Yan (Serbia) N Zimonjić	5	6	[10]

Second round
1	(United States) L Huber (United States) B Bryan	6	3	[12]
(Italy) F Pennetta (Serbia) D Vemić	3	6	[10]
WC	(France) P Parmentier (France) M Gicquel	2	3
5	(Japan) A Sugiyama (Brazil) A Sá	6	6
3	(United States) L Raymond (Poland) M Matkowski	6	5	[6]
(Germany) A-L Grönefeld (The Bahamas) M Knowles	3	7	[10]
Alt	(Australia) A Rodionova (South Africa) R de Voest	4	2
(Russia) A Kleybanova (Brazil) B Soares	6	6

Quarterfinals
1	(United States) L Huber (United States) B Bryan	1	6	[12]
5	(Japan) A Sugiyama (Brazil) A Sá	6	4	[10]
(Germany) A-L Grönefeld (The Bahamas) M Knowles	4	6	[10]
(Russia) A Kleybanova (Brazil) B Soares	6	3	[7]

Semifinals
1	(United States) L Huber (United States) B Bryan	6	6
(Germany) A-L Grönefeld (The Bahamas) M Knowles	2	2

=== Bottom half ===
First round
6	(Russia) E Vesnina (Canada) D Nestor	6	6
WC	(France) S Cohen-Aloro (France) T Ascione	2	1
(India) S Mirza (India) M Bhupathi	1	5
(France) N Dechy (Israel) A Ram	6	7
(Chinese Taipei) C-j Chuang (Germany) C Kas	4	6	[10]
(Chinese Taipei) S-w Hsieh (Australia) A Fisher	6	3	[12]
(United States) R Kops-Jones (United States) E Butorac	1	4
4	(Russia) N Petrova (Belarus) M Mirnyi	6	6
8	(Spain) V Ruano Pascual (Australia) S Huss	4	3
(United States) V King (Brazil) M Melo	6	6
WC	(France) S Brémond Beltrame (Sweden) R Lindstedt	6	6
WC	(France) J Coin (France) N Mahut	3	3
(Slovakia) D Cibulková (Slovakia) F Polášek	6^{2}	6	[7]
(Austria) S Bammer (Poland) Ł Kubot	7	2	[10]
(France) V Razzano (South Africa) J Coetzee	3	3
2	(Zimbabwe) C Black (India) L Paes	6	6

Second round
6	(Russia) E Vesnina (Canada) D Nestor	4	6	[7]
(France) N Dechy (Israel) A Ram	6	4	[10]
(Chinese Taipei) S-w Hsieh (Australia) A Fisher	3	3
4	(Russia) N Petrova (Belarus) M Mirnyi	6	6
(United States) V King (Brazil) M Melo	6	6
WC	(France) S Brémond Beltrame (Sweden) R Lindstedt	2	3
(Austria) S Bammer (Poland) Ł Kubot	6	1	[10]
2	(Zimbabwe) C Black (India) L Paes	0	6	[6]

Quarterfinals
(France) N Dechy (Israel) A Ram	3	1
4	(Russia) N Petrova (Belarus) M Mirnyi	6	6
(United States) V King (Brazil) M Melo	6	7
(Austria) S Bammer (Poland) Ł Kubot	3	5

Semifinals
4	(Russia) N Petrova (Belarus) M Mirnyi	2	6	[7]
(United States) V King (Brazil) M Melo	6	3	[10]
