= 2009 French Open – Wheelchair men's singles =

Wheelchair men's singles
- 2009 French Open

Final
- Champion: (Japan) Shingo Kunieda
- Runner-up: (France) Stéphane Houdet
- Score: 6–3, 3–6, 6–3

Events
Singles	men	women		boys	girls
Doubles	men	women	mixed	boys	girls
WC Singles	men	women	quad
WC Doubles	men	women	quad
Legends	−45	45+	women
- French Open

Two-time defending champion Shingo Kunieda defeated Stéphane Houdet in the final, 6–3, 3–6, 6–3 to win the men's singles wheelchair tennis title at the 2009 French Open. It was his third French Open singles title and seventh major singles title overall.

== Seeds ==
1. (Japan) Shingo Kunieda (champion)
2. (France) Stéphane Houdet (final)

== Draw ==
Key

- Q = Qualifier
- WC = Wild card
- LL = Lucky loser
- Alt = Alternate
- ITF = ITF entry
- PR = Protected ranking
- SR = Special ranking
- SE = Special exempt
- JE = Junior exempt
- JR = Junior Accelerator Programme entrant
- CO = College Accelerator Programme entrant
- NG = Next Gen Accelerator Program entrant
- w/o = Walkover
- r = Retired
- d = Defaulted

=== Finals ===
Quarterfinals
1	(Japan) Shingo Kunieda	6	4	6
(Sweden) Stefan Olsson	0	6	1
(Netherlands) Maikel Scheffers	6	3	3
(France) Michaël Jeremiasz	3	6	6
(Austria) Martin Legner	3	3
(France) Nicolas Peifer	6	6
(Netherlands) Robin Ammerlaan	3	0
2	(France) Stéphane Houdet	6	6

Semifinals
1	(Japan) Shingo Kunieda	6	6
(France) Michaël Jeremiasz	1	2
(France) Nicolas Peifer	5	2
2	(France) Stéphane Houdet	7	6

Final
1	(Japan) Shingo Kunieda	6	3	6
2	(France) Stéphane Houdet	3	6	3
