= Yana Buchina =

Russian tennis player

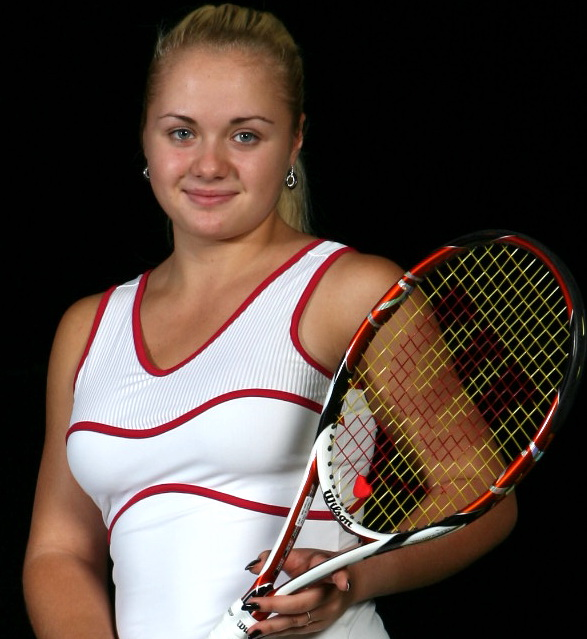
- Yana Buchina, 2010
- Native name: Яна Бучина
- Country (sports): Russia
- Residence: Moscow
- Born: 7 February 1992 (age 33); Samara
- Height: 1.68 m (5 ft 6 in)
- Turned pro: 2007
- Plays: Right-handed (two-handed backhand)
- Prize money: $48,605

Singles
- Career record: 137–97
- Career titles: 2 ITF
- Highest ranking: No. 334 (12 August 2013)

Doubles
- Career record: 22–21
- Career titles: 1 ITF
- Highest ranking: No. 569 (5 March 2012)

Yana Alexandrovna Buchina (Яна Бучина; born 7 February 1992) is a former Russian tennis player. She won two singles titles and one doubles title on tournaments of the ITF Women's Circuit. Her career-high singles ranking is world No. 334, achieved on 12 August 2013.

== Personal life ==
Yana Buchina was born to Alexander and Lillia Buchina in Samara, Russia, where she resides. Her favourite surfaces are grass and hardcourts. She was coached by V. Potapenko and by Eugenia Maniokova.

== Tennis career ==
=== Junior career ===
In 2009, she played in the third round of the Australian Open girls' singles event, and the first round of the girls' doubles event, partnering Heather Watson. The duo lost to Viktoria Kamenskaya and Karina Pimkina 7–5, 6–4. She reached the second round of the French Open girls' event and the semi-finals of the doubles. Yana lost in the third round of girls' singles event and in the third round of the doubles at Wimbledon. And at US Open, she lost in the final of the singles event to Briton Heather Watson, 4–6, 1–6.

In 2010, she lost in the third round of the girls' singles event of the Australian Open.

== ITF Circuit finals ==
$25,000 tournaments
$10,000 tournaments

=== Singles (2–2) ===
Result	No.	Date	Tournament	Surface	Opponent	Score
Loss	1.	24 April 2011	ITF Antalya, Turkey	Hard	(Russia) Marta Sirotkina	1–6, 0–6
Win	2.	1 May 2011	ITF Antalya	Hard	(Georgia (country)) Ekaterine Gorgodze	6–3, 6–4
Win	3.	22 April 2012	ITF Antalya	Hard	(Germany) Nicola Geuer	6–3, 6–4
Loss	4.	28 January 2013	ITF Antalya	Clay	(South Korea) Lee Jin-a	5–7, 3–6

=== Doubles (1–2) ===
Outcome	No.	Date	Tournament	Surface	Partner	Opponents	Score
Loss	1.	9 March 2009	ITF Las Palmas, Spain	Hard	(Slovenia) Taja Mohorčič	(China) Lu Jingjing (China) Sun Shengnan	3–6, 6–7^{(1)}
Win	2.	10 September 2010	ITF Sarajevo, Bosnia and Herzegovina	Clay	(Russia) Polina Rodionova	(Croatia) Ani Mijačika (Croatia) Matea Čutura	7–6^{(5)}, 2–6, [10–5]
Loss	3.	23 April 2014	ITF Namangan, Uzbekistan	Hard	(Venezuela) Andrea Gámiz	(Russia) Eugeniya Pashkova (Ukraine) Ganna Poznikhirenko	4–6, 1–6
