= 2009 French Open – Wheelchair women's singles =

Wheelchair women's singles
- 2009 French Open

Final
- Champion: (Netherlands) Esther Vergeer
- Runner-up: (Netherlands) Korie Homan
- Score: 6–2, 7–5

Events
| Singles | men | women | | boys | girls |
| Doubles | men | women | mixed | boys | girls |
| WC Singles | men | women | quad |
| WC Doubles | men | women | quad |
| Legends | −45 | 45+ | women |
- French Open

Two-time defending champion Esther Vergeer defeated Korie Homan in a rematch of the previous year's final, 6–2, 7–5 to win the women's singles wheelchair tennis title at the 2009 French Open.

== Seeds ==
1. (Netherlands) Esther Vergeer (champion)
2. (Netherlands) Korie Homan (final)

== Draw ==
Key

- Q = Qualifier
- WC = Wild card
- LL = Lucky loser
- Alt = Alternate
- ITF = ITF entry
- PR = Protected ranking
- SR = Special ranking
- SE = Special exempt
- JE = Junior exempt
- JR = Junior Accelerator Programme entrant
- CO = College Accelerator Programme entrant
- NG = Next Gen Accelerator Program entrant
- w/o = Walkover
- r = Retired
- d = Defaulted

=== Finals ===
Quarterfinals
1 | (Netherlands) Esther Vergeer | 6 | 6
(Netherlands) Aniek van Koot | 0 | 0
(France) Florence Gravellier | 4 | 6 | 6
(Netherlands) Jiske Griffioen | 6 | 2 | 1
(Belgium) Annick Sevenans | 3 | 5
(Netherlands) Sharon Walraven | 6 | 7
(United Kingdom) Lucy Shuker | 0 | 0
2 | (Netherlands) Korie Homan | 6 | 6

Semifinals
1 | (Netherlands) Esther Vergeer | 6 | 6
(France) Florence Gravellier | 2 | 2
(Netherlands) Sharon Walraven | 0 | 2
2 | (Netherlands) Korie Homan | 6 | 6

Final
1 | (Netherlands) Esther Vergeer | 6 | 7
2 | (Netherlands) Korie Homan | 2 | 5
