= 2009 French Open – Wheelchair women's doubles =

Wheelchair women's doubles
- 2009 French Open

Final
- Champions: (Netherlands) Korie Homan (Netherlands) Esther Vergeer
- Runners-up: (Belgium) Annick Sevenans (Netherlands) Aniek van Koot
- Score: 6–2, 6–3

Events
Singles	men	women		boys	girls
Doubles	men	women	mixed	boys	girls
WC Singles	men	women	quad
WC Doubles	men	women	quad
Legends	−45	45+	women
- French Open

Two-time defending champion Esther Vergeer and her partner Korie Homan defeated Annick Sevenans and Aniek van Koot in the final, 6–2, 6–3 to win the women's doubles wheelchair tennis title at the 2009 French Open. It was their second step towards an eventual Grand Slam.

Jiske Griffioen and Vergeer were the reigning champions, but did not compete together. Griffioen partnered Florence Gravellier, but was defeated in the semifinals by Sevenans and van Koot.

== Seeds ==
1. (Netherlands) Korie Homan / (Netherlands) Esther Vergeer (champions)
2. (France) Florence Gravellier / (Netherlands) Jiske Griffioen (semifinals)

== Draw ==
Key

- Q = Qualifier
- WC = Wild card
- LL = Lucky loser
- Alt = Alternate
- ITF = ITF entry
- PR = Protected ranking
- SR = Special ranking
- SE = Special exempt
- JE = Junior exempt
- JR = Junior Accelerator Programme entrant
- CO = College Accelerator Programme entrant
- NG = Next Gen Accelerator Program entrant
- w/o = Walkover
- r = Retired
- d = Defaulted

=== Finals ===
Semifinals
1	(Netherlands) Korie Homan (Netherlands) Esther Vergeer	6	6
(United Kingdom) Lucy Shuker (Netherlands) Sharon Walraven	1	2
(Belgium) Annick Sevenans (Netherlands) Aniek van Koot	6	7
2	(France) Florence Gravellier (Netherlands) Jiske Griffioen	4	6^{5}

Final
1	(Netherlands) Korie Homan (Netherlands) Esther Vergeer	6	6
(Belgium) Annick Sevenans (Netherlands) Aniek van Koot	2	3
