= 2009 French Open – Legends under 45 doubles =

Legends under 45 doubles
- 2009 French Open

Final
- Champions: (Netherlands) Paul Haarhuis (France) Cédric Pioline
- Runners-up: (Australia) Pat Cash (Spain) Emilio Sánchez
- Score: 6–3, 6–4

Events
Singles	men	women		boys	girls
Doubles	men	women	mixed	boys	girls
WC Singles	men	women	quad
WC Doubles	men	women	quad
Legends	−45	45+	women
← 2008 ·	French Open	· 2010 →

Goran Ivanišević and Michael Stich were the defending champions, but lost in the round robin.

Paul Haarhuis and Cédric Pioline won in the final 6–3, 6–4, against Pat Cash and Emilio Sánchez

== Draw ==
=== Key ===
- Q = Qualifier
- WC = Wild card
- LL = Lucky loser
- Alt = Alternate
- ITF = ITF entry
- PR = Protected ranking
- SR = Special ranking
- SE = Special exempt
- JE = Junior exempt
- JR = Junior Accelerator Programme entrant
- CO = College Accelerator Programme entrant
- NG = Next Gen Accelerator Program entrant
- w/o = Walkover
- r = Retired
- d = Defaulted

=== Final ===
Final
(Australia) Pat Cash (Spain) Emilio Sánchez	3	4
(Netherlands) Paul Haarhuis (France) Cédric Pioline	6	6

=== Group A ===
	(Australia) Cash (Spain) Sánchez	(Croatia) Ivanišević (Germany) Stich	(Russia) Kafelnikov (Austria) Muster	RR; W–L	Set; W–L	Game; W–L	Standings
(Australia) Pat Cash (Spain) Emilio Sánchez		6–3, 2–6, 10–5	6–1, 7–5	2–0	4–1	22–15	1
(Croatia) Goran Ivanišević (Germany) Michael Stich	3–6, 6–2, 5–10		6–3, 7–5	1–1	3–2	22–17	2
(Russia) Yevgeny Kafelnikov (Austria) Thomas Muster	1–6, 5–7	3–6, 5–7		0–2	0–4	14–26	3

Standings are determined by: 1. number of wins; 2. number of matches; 3. in three-players-ties, percentage of sets won, or of games won; 4. steering-committee decision.

=== Group B ===
	(Netherlands) Haarhuis (France) Pioline	(Spain) Bruguera (Netherlands) Krajicek	(France) Boetsch (France) Forget	RR; W–L	Set; W–L	Game; W–L	Standings
(Netherlands) Paul Haarhuis (France) Cédric Pioline		2–6, 7–6(4), 10–5	6–4, 6–2	2–0	4–1	22–18	1
(Spain) Sergi Bruguera (Netherlands) Richard Krajicek	6–2, 6–7(4), 5–10		6–1, 7–6(2)	1–1	3–2	25–17	2
(France) Arnaud Boetsch (France) Guy Forget	4–6, 2–6	1–6, 6–7(2)		0–2	0–4	13–25	3

Standings are determined by: 1. number of wins; 2. number of matches; 3. in three-players-ties, percentage of sets won, or of games won; 4. steering-committee decision.
