= 2009 French Open – Girls' doubles =

Girls' doubles
- 2009 French Open

Final
- Champions: (Romania) Elena Bogdan (Thailand) Noppawan Lertcheewakarn
- Runners-up: (Hungary) Tímea Babos (United Kingdom) Heather Watson
- Score: 3–6, 6–3, 10–8

Events
Singles	men	women		boys	girls
Doubles	men	women	mixed	boys	girls
WC Singles	men	women	quad
WC Doubles	men	women	quad
Legends	−45	45+	women
← 2008 ·	French Open	· 2010 →

Polona Hercog and Jessica Moore were the defending champions, but did not compete in the Juniors this year.

Elena Bogdan and Noppawan Lertcheewakarn won in the final 3–6, 6–3, 10–8, against Tímea Babos and Heather Watson.

== Seeds ==
1. (Romania) Ana Bogdan / (Croatia) Ajla Tomljanović (first round)
2. (Romania) Elena Bogdan / (Thailand) Noppawan Lertcheewakarn (champions)
3. (Hungary) Tímea Babos / (United Kingdom) Heather Watson (final)
4. (France) Kristina Mladenovic / (Croatia) Silvia Njirić (quarterfinals)
5. (Paraguay) Verónica Cepede Royg / (Chile) Camila Silva (second round)
6. (Russia) Yana Buchina / (Russia) Ksenia Pervak (semifinals)
7. (United States) Beatrice Capra / (United States) Lauren Embree (quarterfinals)
8. (United States) Christina McHale / (United States) Sloane Stephens (second round)

== Draw ==
=== Key ===
- Q = Qualifier
- WC = Wild card
- LL = Lucky loser
- Alt = Alternate
- SE = Special exempt
- PR = Protected ranking
- ITF = ITF entry
- JE = Junior exempt
- w/o = Walkover
- r = Retired
- d = Defaulted
- SR = Special ranking

=== Finals ===
Semifinals
(Russia) Ksenia Kirillova (Italy) Martina Trevisan	2	7	[8]
3	(Hungary) Tímea Babos (United Kingdom) Heather Watson	6	5	[10]
6	(Russia) Yana Buchina (Russia) Ksenia Pervak	1	6	[4]
2	(Romania) Elena Bogdan (Thailand) Noppawan Lertcheewakarn	6	4	[10]

Final
3	(Hungary) Tímea Babos (United Kingdom) Heather Watson	6	3	[8]
2	(Romania) Elena Bogdan (Thailand) Noppawan Lertcheewakarn	3	6	[10]

=== Top half ===
First round
1	(Romania) A Bogdan (Croatia) A Tomljanović	2	1
(Russia) K Kirillova (Italy) M Trevisan	6	6
WC	(France) N Mohn (France) G Radovanovic	6	6
(United Kingdom) H James (Ukraine) M Zanevska	0	1
(Australia) I Holland (Australia) O Rogowska	4	6	[10]
(Russia) N Guskova (Russia) K Pimkina	6	1	[5]
(Germany) L Berlinecke (Slovenia) N Kolar	6	5	[1]
5	(Paraguay) V C Royg (Chile) C Silva	0	7	[10]
3	(Hungary) T Babos (United Kingdom) H Watson	6	7
(United States) M Burdette (Netherlands) Q Lemoine	4	5
(Russia) P Leykina (Russia) E Nikitina	6	2	[10]
WC	(France) L Jeanjean (Russia) D Salnikova	4	6	[8]
(Canada) K Paliivets (South Africa) C Simmonds	6	6
(Serbia) T Čurović (Belarus) N Pintusova	2	2
(Kazakhstan) Z Diyas (Russia) V Savinykh	6^{2}	5
8	(United States) C McHale (United States) S Stephens	7	7

Second round
(Russia) K Kirillova (Italy) M Trevisan	6	6
WC	(France) N Mohn (France) G Radovanovic	3	2
(Australia) I Holland (Australia) O Rogowska	6	6
5	(Paraguay) V C Royg (Chile) C Silva	2	2
3	(Hungary) T Babos (United Kingdom) H Watson	6	6
(Russia) P Leykina (Russia) E Nikitina	3	2
(Canada) K Paliivets (South Africa) C Simmonds	6	6
8	(United States) C McHale (United States) S Stephens	4	2

Quarterfinals
(Russia) K Kirillova (Italy) M Trevisan	w/o
(Australia) I Holland (Australia) O Rogowska
3	(Hungary) T Babos (United Kingdom) H Watson	6	6
(Canada) K Paliivets (South Africa) C Simmonds	3	4

Semifinals
(Russia) K Kirillova (Italy) M Trevisan	2	7	[8]
3	(Hungary) T Babos (United Kingdom) H Watson	6	5	[10]

=== Bottom half ===
First round
6	(Russia) Y Buchina (Russia) K Pervak	1	6	[12]
(Oman) F Al-Nabhani (Indonesia) GS Ysidora	6	4	[10]
(Denmark) M Ejdesgaard (Mexico) A Granillo	2	2
(Norway) U Eikeri (Hungary) Z Susányi	6	6
(United Kingdom) S Cornish (Argentina) P Ormaechea	7	0	[10]
(Slovakia) J Čepelová (Slovakia) V Juhászová	6^{4}	6	[8]
WC	(Japan) E Mutaguchi (Japan) A Omae	2	1
4	(France) K Mladenovic (Croatia) S Njirić	6	6
7	(United States) B Capra (United States) L Embree	6	6
WC	(France) C de Bernardi (France) S Ficheux	2	2
(Serbia) A Krunić (Poland) S Zaniewska	6	6^{3}	[2]
(Belarus) A Orlik (United Kingdom) L Robson	4	7	[10]
(Netherlands) R Hogenkamp (Netherlands) L Kerkhove	6	3	[8]
(Russia) I Khromacheva (Belgium) A-S Mestach	1	6	[10]
(Germany) S Haas (Poland) M Linette	3	3
2	(Romania) E Bogdan (Thailand) N Lertcheewakarn	6	6

Second round
6	(Russia) Y Buchina (Russia) K Pervak	2	6	[10]
(Norway) U Eikeri (Hungary) Z Susányi	6	2	[0]
(United Kingdom) S Cornish (Argentina) P Ormaechea	6^{3}	0
4	(France) K Mladenovic (Croatia) S Njirić	7	6
7	(United States) B Capra (United States) L Embree	w/o
(Belarus) A Orlik (United Kingdom) L Robson
(Russia) I Khromacheva (Belgium) A-S Mestach	3	7	[3]
2	(Romania) E Bogdan (Thailand) N Lertcheewakarn	6	5	[10]

Quarterfinals
6	(Russia) Y Buchina (Russia) K Pervak	3	6	[10]
4	(France) K Mladenovic (Croatia) S Njirić	6	3	[6]
7	(United States) B Capra (United States) L Embree	1	4
2	(Romania) E Bogdan (Thailand) N Lertcheewakarn	6	6

Semifinals
6	(Russia) Y Buchina (Russia) K Pervak	1	6	4
2	(Romania) E Bogdan (Thailand) N Lertcheewakarn	6	4	[10]
