= 2009 French Open – Wheelchair men's doubles =

Wheelchair men's doubles
- 2009 French Open

Final
- Champion: (France) Stéphane Houdet (France) Michaël Jeremiasz
- Runner-up: (Netherlands) Robin Ammerlaan (Netherlands) Maikel Scheffers
- Score: 6–2, 7–5

Events
Singles	men	women		boys	girls
Doubles	men	women	mixed	boys	girls
WC Singles	men	women	quad
WC Doubles	men	women	quad
Legends	−45	45+	women
- French Open

Stéphane Houdet and Michaël Jeremiasz defeated the defending champion Maikel Scheffers and his partner Robin Ammerlaan in the final, 6–2, 7–5, to win the men's doubles wheelchair tennis title at the 2009 French Open.

Shingo Kunieda and Scheffers were the defending champions, but did not compete together. Kunieda partnered Stefan Olsson, but was defeated by Ammerlaan and Scheffers in the semifinals.

== Seeds ==
1. (France) Stéphane Houdet / (France) Michaël Jeremiasz (champions)
2. (Japan) Shingo Kunieda / (Sweden) Stefan Olsson (semifinals)

== Draw ==
Key

- Q = Qualifier
- WC = Wild card
- LL = Lucky loser
- Alt = Alternate
- ITF = ITF entry
- PR = Protected ranking
- SR = Special ranking
- SE = Special exempt
- JE = Junior exempt
- JR = Junior Accelerator Programme entrant
- CO = College Accelerator Programme entrant
- NG = Next Gen Accelerator Program entrant
- w/o = Walkover
- r = Retired
- d = Defaulted

=== Finals ===
Semifinals
1	(France) Stéphane Houdet (France) Michaël Jeremiasz	6	6
(Austria) Martin Legner (France) Nicolas Peifer	1	3
(Netherlands) Robin Ammerlaan (Netherlands) Maikel Scheffers	6^{2}	6	[10]
2	(Japan) Shingo Kunieda (Sweden) Stefan Olsson	7	2	[8]

Final
1	(France) Stéphane Houdet (France) Michaël Jeremiasz	6	7
(Netherlands) Robin Ammerlaan (Netherlands) Maikel Scheffers	2	5
