= 2009 French Open – Legends over 45 doubles =

Legends over 45 doubles
- 2009 French Open

Final
- Champion: (Sweden) Anders Järryd (United States) John McEnroe
- Runner-up: (Iran) Mansour Bahrami (France) Henri Leconte
- Score: 7–6^{(7–2)}, 6–1

Events
Singles	men	women		boys	girls
Doubles	men	women	mixed	boys	girls
WC Singles	men	women	quad
WC Doubles	men	women	quad
Legends	−45	45+	women
← 2008 ·	French Open	· 2010 →

Anders Järryd and John McEnroe were the defending champions, and won in the final 7–6^{(7–2)}, 6–1, against Mansour Bahrami and Henri Leconte.

== Draw ==
=== Key ===
- Q = Qualifier
- WC = Wild card
- LL = Lucky loser
- Alt = Alternate
- ITF = ITF entry
- PR = Protected ranking
- SR = Special ranking
- SE = Special exempt
- JE = Junior exempt
- JR = Junior Accelerator Programme entrant
- CO = College Accelerator Programme entrant
- NG = Next Gen Accelerator Program entrant
- w/o = Walkover
- r = Retired
- d = Defaulted

=== Final ===
Final
(Sweden) Anders Järryd (United States) John McEnroe	7	6
(Iran) Mansour Bahrami (France) Henri Leconte	6^{2}	1

=== Group A ===
	(Sweden) Järryd (United States) McEnroe	(Sweden) Pernfors (Sweden) Wilander	(Australia) Fitzgerald (Argentina) Vilas	RR; W–L	Set; W–L	Game; W–L	Standings
(Sweden) Anders Järryd (United States) John McEnroe		6–1, 6–4	6–2, 6–3	2–0	4–0	24–10	1
(Sweden) Mikael Pernfors (Sweden) Mats Wilander	1–6, 4–6		6–3, 6–3	1–1	2–2	17–18	2
(Australia) John Fitzgerald (Argentina) Guillermo Vilas	2–6, 3–6	3–6, 3–6		0–2	0–4	11–24	3

Standings are determined by: 1. number of wins; 2. number of matches; 3. in three-players-ties, percentage of sets won, or of games won; 4. steering-committee decision.

=== Group B ===
	(Iran) Bahrami (France) Leconte	(Ecuador) Gómez (Paraguay) Pecci	(Australia) McNamara (Romania) Năstase	RR; W–L	Set; W–L	Game; W–L	Standings
(Iran) Mansour Bahrami (France) Henri Leconte		6–4, 7–6(4)	6–7(9), 7–5, 11–9	2–0	4–1	27–22	1
(Ecuador) Andrés Gómez (Paraguay) Víctor Pecci	4–6, 6–7(4)		6–2, 6–1	1–1	2–2	22–16	2
(Australia) Peter McNamara (Romania) Ilie Năstase	7–6(9), 5–7, 9–11	2–6, 1–6		0–2	1–4	15–26	3

Standings are determined by: 1. number of wins; 2. number of matches; 3. in three-players-ties, percentage of sets won, or of games won; 4. steering-committee decision.
