= 2008 French Open – Wheelchair men's doubles =

Wheelchair men's doubles
- 2008 French Open

Final
- Champion: (Japan) Shingo Kunieda (Netherlands) Maikel Scheffers
- Runner-up: (Netherlands) Robin Ammerlaan (Netherlands) Ronald Vink
- Score: 6–2, 7–5

Events
Singles	men	women		boys	girls
Doubles	men	women	mixed	boys	girls
WC Singles	men	women	quad
WC Doubles	men	women	quad
Legends	−45	45+	women
- French Open

Shingo Kunieda and Maikel Scheffers defeated Robin Ammerlaan and Ronald Vink in the final, 6–2, 7–5 to win the men's doubles wheelchair tennis title at the 2008 French Open. With the win, Kunieda completed the career Grand Slam.

Stéphane Houdet and Michaël Jérémiasz were the defending champions, but Jérémiasz did not participate. Houdet partnered Nicolas Peifer, but was defeated by Ammerlaan and Vink in the semifinals.

== Seeds ==
1. (Netherlands) Robin Ammerlaan / (Netherlands) Ronald Vink (final)
2. (Japan) Shingo Kunieda / (Netherlands) Maikel Scheffers (champions)

== Draw ==
Key

- Q = Qualifier
- WC = Wild card
- LL = Lucky loser
- Alt = Alternate
- ITF = ITF entry
- PR = Protected ranking
- SR = Special ranking
- SE = Special exempt
- JE = Junior exempt
- JR = Junior Accelerator Programme entrant
- CO = College Accelerator Programme entrant
- NG = Next Gen Accelerator Program entrant
- w/o = Walkover
- r = Retired
- d = Defaulted

=== Finals ===
Semifinals
1	(Netherlands) Robin Ammerlaan (Netherlands) Ronald Vink	6	1	[10]
(France) Stéphane Houdet (France) Nicolas Peifer	1	6	[6]
(Austria) Martin Legner (Sweden) Stefan Olsson	1	2
2	(Japan) Shingo Kunieda (Netherlands) Maikel Scheffers	6	6

Final
1	(Netherlands) Robin Ammerlaan (Netherlands) Ronald Vink	2	5
2	(Japan) Shingo Kunieda (Netherlands) Maikel Scheffers	6	7
