= Daniel Berta =

Swedish tennis player

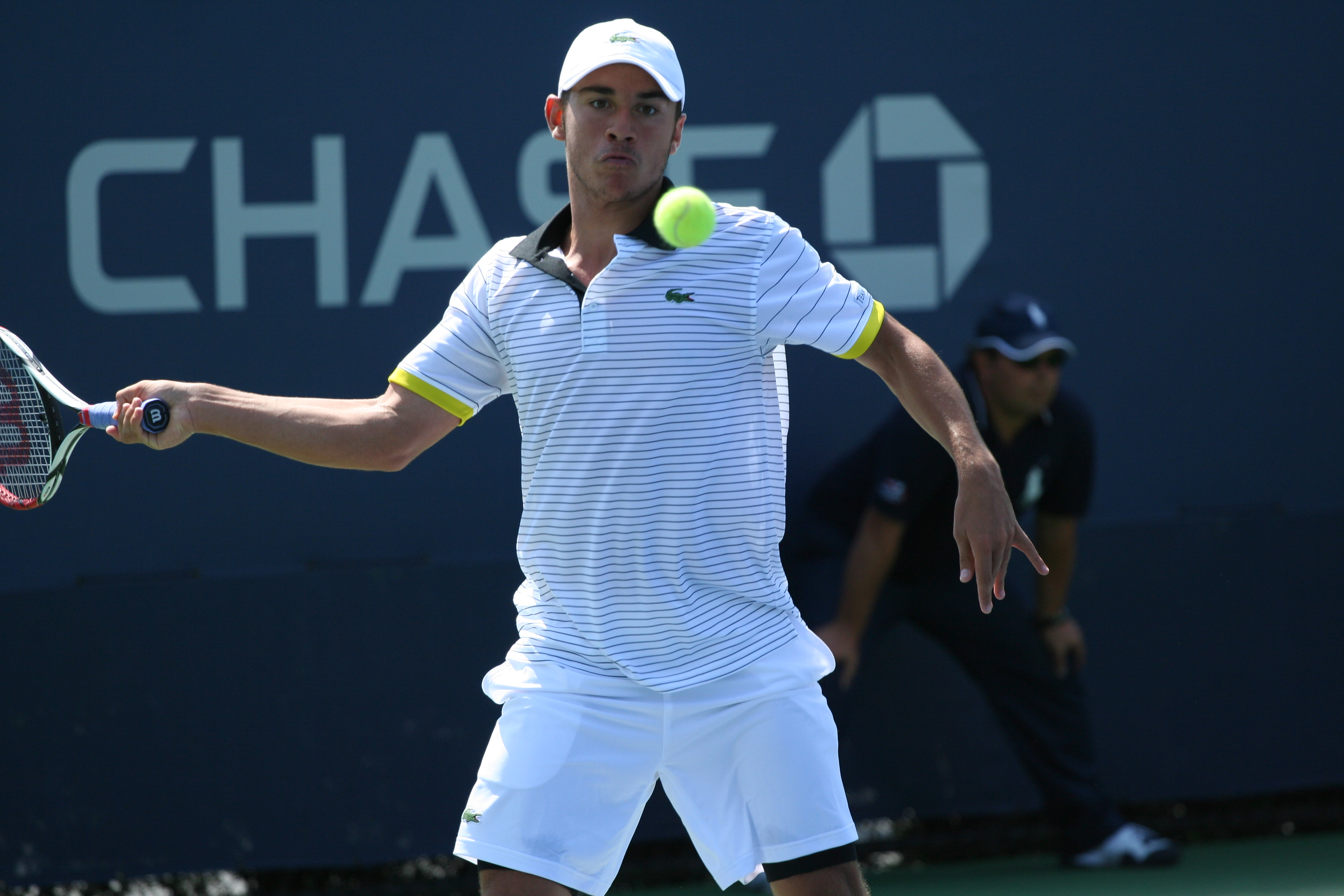
- Country (sports): Sweden
- Residence: Uppsala, Sweden
- Born: 26 November 1992 (age 32) Helsingborg, Sweden
- Height: 1.78 m (5 ft 10 in)
- Plays: Right-handed (two-handed backhand)
- Prize money: $27,060

Singles
- Career record: 0–2
- Career titles: 0
- Highest ranking: No. 637 (30 January 2012)

Grand Slam singles results
- French Open: Q1 (2010)

Doubles
- Career record: 0–2
- Career titles: 0
- Highest ranking: No. 1234 (13 May 2013)
- Last updated on: 13 January 2022.

Daniel Berta (born 26 November 1992) is a Swedish tennis player. He won the Boys' Singles event at the 2009 French Open.

== Career ==
=== Junior ===
In the 2009 French Open, he entered the Boys' Singles as an unseeded player. He defeated 9 seed Facundo Argüello in the first round. He then won against Pablo Carreño Busta and Federico Gaio to reach the quarter-finals, where he defeated Richard Becker in straight sets. In the semi-finals, he defeated Henri Laaksonen to reach his first ever junior Grand Slam final. He defeated French player and 11 seed Gianni Mina 6–1, 3–6, 6–3 for his first ever junior Grand Slam title.

In the junior 2009 Wimbledon Championships, Berta lost in the third round to American Alexander Domijan 3–6, 3–6.

=== ATP ===
He was granted a wildcard into the 2009 Ordina Open, which was his ATP tournament debut. He lost to Belgian qualifier Dick Norman in the first round, 3–6, 3–6. He also received a wildcard into the 2009 Swedish Open, where he lost to Björn Phau in the first round 3–6, 2–6.

== Junior Grand Slam finals ==
=== Singles: 1 (1 title) ===
Result	Year	Tournament	Surface	Opponent	Score
Win	2009	French Open	Clay	(France) Gianni Mina	6–1, 3–6, 6–3

== ATP Challenger and ITF Futures finals ==
=== Singles: 1 (0–1) ===
Legend ATP Challenger (0–0) ITF Futures (0–1)	Finals by surface Hard (0–1) Clay (0–0) Grass (0–0) Carpet (0–0)

Result	W–L	Date	Tournament	Tier	Surface	Opponent	Score
Loss	0–1	Oct 2011	Turkey F28, Adana	Futures	Hard	(Canada) Erik Chvojka	3–6, 1–6

=== Doubles: 1 (0–1) ===
Legend ATP Challenger (0–0) ITF Futures (0–1)	Finals by surface Hard (0–1) Clay (0–0) Grass (0–0) Carpet (0–0)

Result	W–L	Date	Tournament	Tier	Surface	Partner	Opponents	Score
Loss	0–1	Sep 2012	Sweden F4, Uppsala	Futures	Hard	(Sweden) Nicklas Szymanski	(Sweden) Milos Sekulic (Denmark) Soren Wedege	2–6, 6–7^{(1–7)}

Awards
Preceded by (Chinese Taipei) Yang Tsung-hua	ITF Junior World Champion; 2009	Succeeded by (Colombia) Juan Sebastián Gómez
