= Sharon Walraven =

Dutch wheelchair tennis player

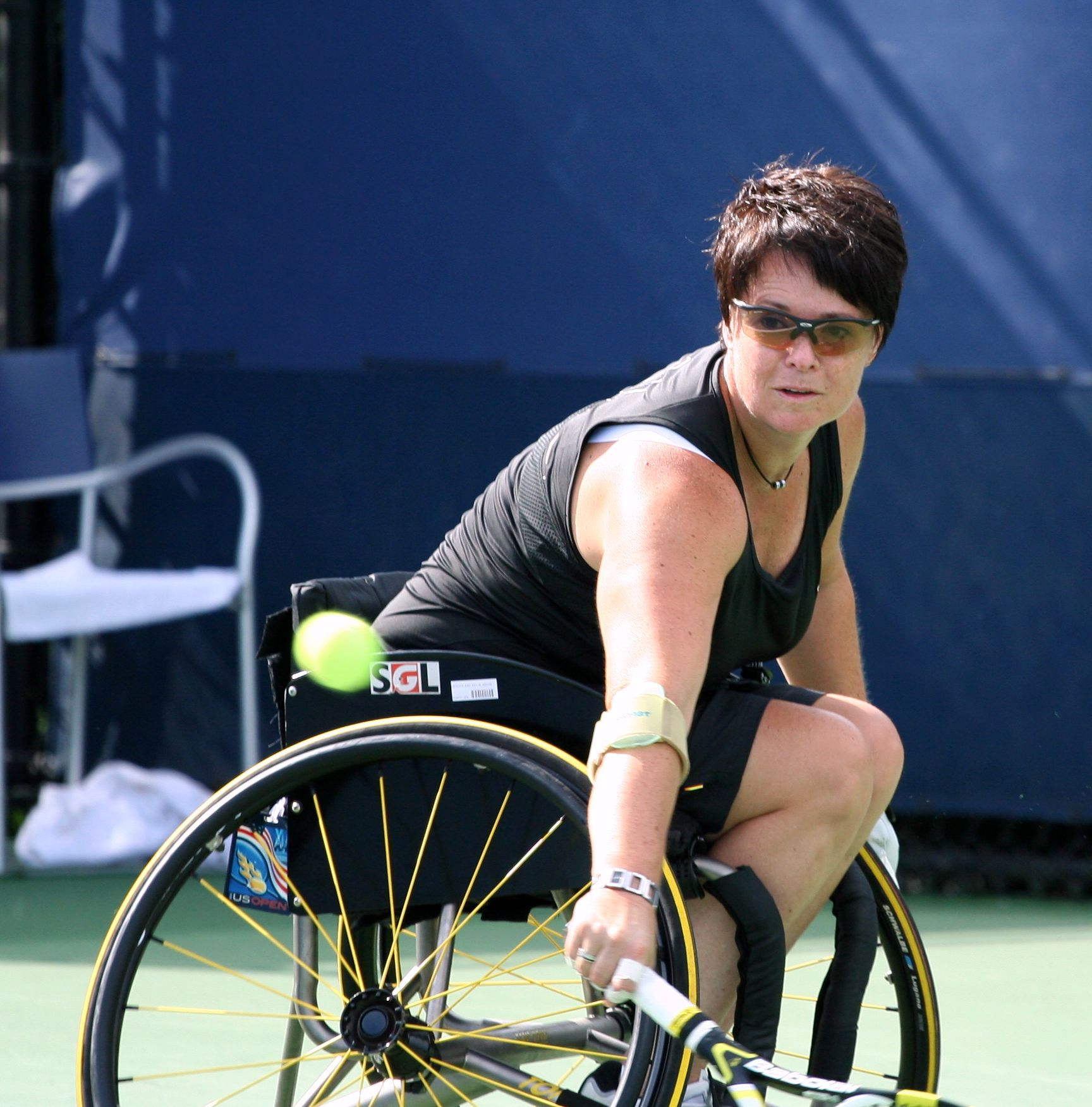
- Walraven competing at the 2011 US Open
- Country (sports): Netherlands
- Born: 19 June 1970 (age 56) Schaesberg, Netherlands
- Turned pro: 1994
- Plays: Right Handed
- Official website: www.sharonwalraven.nl

Singles
- Career record: 527–238
- Highest ranking: No. 2 (11 April 2005)

Grand Slam singles results
- Australian Open: SF (2006)
- French Open: F (2010)
- US Open: F (2006)

Other tournaments
- Masters: F (2006)
- Paralympic Games: Silver Medal (2000)

Doubles
- Career record: 354–145
- Highest ranking: No. 1 (4 July 2005)

Grand Slam doubles results
- Australian Open: W (2011, 2012)
- French Open: W (2011)
- Wimbledon: W (2010, 2011)
- US Open: W (2010, 2011)

Other doubles tournaments
- Masters Doubles: W (2010, 2011)
- Paralympic Games: Gold Medal (2008)
Medal record
Women's wheelchair tennis
Representing Netherlands
Paralympic Games
Gold medal – first place	2008 Beijing	Women's doubles
Silver medal – second place	2000 Sydney	Women's singles
- Last updated on: 19 August 2012.

Sharon Walraven (born 19 June 1970 in Schaesberg) is a Dutch wheelchair tennis player. She became paraplegic at age 23 after complications following a fall while she was ice-skating. She has won seven Grand Slams doubles titles partnering compatriot Esther Vergeer. At the 2008 Paralympics in Beijing she won the gold medal in the women's doubles competition. At the 2000 Paralympics in Sydney she won a silver medal in the women's singles competition. Walraven has a highest ranking of No.2 in singles and No.1 in doubles.

Walraven won the doubles title with Griffioen in St Louis 2010, however the pair lost in the final in Paris. With Graviller she took the Florida Open title.

With Vergeer, Walraven achieved the Grand Slam in 2011, defeating Griffioen and van Koot in all four finals. During the finals the pair recovered from being 5–2 down in the final set at Wimbledon and 6–1 down in the second set tiebreak at the US Open to win. The pair were also victorious in the Masters. Alongside Vergeer she lost the final at Boca Raton.

2012 saw Walraven win a singles title in Trofeo della Mole. However Walraven also lost finals in Sardinia, Olot and Gauteng. In doubles competition Walraven won the first Grand Slam of the year, the Australian Open with Vergeer. Throughout the rest of the year she won the Japan Open with Buis, and titles in Olot and Sardinia with Ellerbrock. Walraven was runner up at the Pensacola Open with Vergeer, in Atlanta with Sevenans, and made the finals in Gauteng and Johannesburg with Kruger. Walraven helped her nation win a 25th World Team Cup final.

== Grand Slam titles ==
- Australian Open: singles 2005, doubles 2011, 2012
- French Open: doubles 2011
- Wimbledon: doubles 2010, 2011
- US Open: doubles 2010, 2011

== Grand Slam performance timelines ==
Key
W	F	SF	QF	#R	RR	Q#	DNQ	A	NH

(W) winner; (F) finalist; (SF) semifinalist; (QF) quarterfinalist; (#R) rounds 4, 3, 2, 1; (RR) round-robin stage; (Q#) qualification round; (DNQ) did not qualify; (A) absent; (NH) not held; (SR) strike rate (events won / competed); (W–L) win–loss record.
To avoid confusion and double counting, these charts are updated at the conclusion of a tournament or when the player's participation has ended.

=== Wheelchair singles ===
Tournament	2006	2007	2008	2009	2010	2011	2012	2013	2014	2015	Career SR
Australian Open	?	?	QF	A	A	QF	QF	QF	QF	QF	0 / 6
French Open	NH	?	QF	SF	F	QF	SF	QF	A	QF	0 / 7
Wimbledon	NH	NH	NH	NH	NH	NH	NH	NH	NH	NH	0 / 0
US Open	F	SF	NH	SF	SF	QF	NH	A	QF	A	0 / 6

=== Wheelchair doubles ===
Tournament	2006	2007	2008	2009	2010	2011	2012	2013	2014	2015	Career SR
Australian Open	?	?	F	A	A	W	W	SF	SF	SF	2 / 6
French Open	NH	?	F	SF	F	W	SF	F	A	SF	1 / 7
Wimbledon	NH	NH	NH	SF	W	W	SF	SF	SF	A	2 / 6
US Open	SF	F	NH	SF	W	W	NH	A	SF	A	2 / 6
