= 2008 French Open – Mixed doubles =

Mixed doubles
- 2008 French Open

Final
- Champion: (Belarus) Victoria Azarenka (United States) Bob Bryan
- Runner-up: (Slovenia) Katarina Srebotnik (Serbia) Nenad Zimonjić
- Score: 6–2, 7–6^{(7–4)}

Details
- Draw: 32
- Seeds: 8

Events
Singles	men	women		boys	girls
Doubles	men	women	mixed	boys	girls
WC Singles	men	women	quad
WC Doubles	men	women	quad
Legends	−45	45+	women
- French Open

Victoria Azarenka and Bob Bryan defeated Katarina Srebotnik and Nenad Zimonjić in the final, 6–2, 7–6^{(7–4)} to win the mixed doubles tennis title at the 2008 French Open.

Nathalie Dechy and Andy Ram were the defending champions, but lost in the first round to Dominika Cibulková and Gaël Monfils.

== Seeds ==
1. (Slovenia) Katarina Srebotnik / (Serbia) Nenad Zimonjić (final)
2. (Czech Republic) Květa Peschke / (Czech Republic) Pavel Vízner (semifinals)
3. (Belarus) Victoria Azarenka / (United States) Bob Bryan (champions)
4. (Chinese Taipei) Chuang Chia-jung / (Israel) Jonathan Erlich (first round)
5. (China) Yan Zi / (The Bahamas) Mark Knowles (second round)
6. (Zimbabwe) Cara Black / (Australia) Paul Hanley (second round)
7. (United States) Lisa Raymond / (Sweden) Simon Aspelin (first round)
8. (Australia) Alicia Molik / (Sweden) Jonas Björkman (first round)

== Draw ==
Key

- Q = Qualifier
- WC = Wild card
- LL = Lucky loser
- Alt = Alternate
- ITF = ITF entry
- PR = Protected ranking
- SR = Special ranking
- SE = Special exempt
- JE = Junior exempt
- JR = Junior Accelerator Programme entrant
- CO = College Accelerator Programme entrant
- NG = Next Gen Accelerator Program entrant
- w/o = Walkover
- r = Retired
- d = Defaulted

=== Finals ===
Semifinals
1	(Slovenia) Katarina Srebotnik (Serbia) Nenad Zimonjić	w/o
(China) Zheng Jie (India) Mahesh Bhupathi
3	(Belarus) Victoria Azarenka (United States) Bob Bryan	4	6	[10]
2	(Czech Republic) Květa Peschke (Czech Republic) Pavel Vízner	6	3	[8]

Final
1	(Slovenia) Katarina Srebotnik (Serbia) Nenad Zimonjić	2	6^{4}
3	(Belarus) Victoria Azarenka (United States) Bob Bryan	6	7

=== Top half ===
First round
1	(Slovenia) K Srebotnik (Serbia) N Zimonjić	6	6
(Russia) E Vesnina (South Africa) J Coetzee	1	2
WC	(Slovakia) D Cibulková (France) G Monfils	6	6
(France) N Dechy (Israel) A Ram	4	4
(China) T Sun (Belarus) M Mirnyi	3	4
(France) A Cornet (Brazil) M Melo	6	6
(Ukraine) K Bondarenko (Australia) J Kerr	7	6
7	(United States) L Raymond (Sweden) S Aspelin	5	2
4	(Chinese Taipei) C-j Chuang (Israel) J Erlich	6^{3}	1
Alt	(Belarus) O Govortsova (United States) D Martin	7	6
WC	(France) V Razzano (Netherlands) R Wassen	7	7
(China) S Peng (South Africa) W Moodie	6^{2}	5
(Russia) N Petrova (India) L Paes	5	4
(China) J Zheng (India) M Bhupathi	7	6
(Russia) E Likhovtseva (Canada) D Nestor	4	6	[7]
6	(Zimbabwe) C Black (Australia) P Hanley	6	3	[10]

Second round
1	(Slovenia) K Srebotnik (Serbia) N Zimonjić	6	6
WC	(Slovakia) D Cibulková (France) G Monfils	2	3
(France) A Cornet (Brazil) M Melo	4	6	[3]
(Ukraine) K Bondarenko (Australia) J Kerr	6	3	[10]
Alt	(Belarus) O Govortsova (United States) D Martin	7	3	[6]
WC	(France) V Razzano (Netherlands) R Wassen	6	6	[10]
(China) J Zheng (India) M Bhupathi	7	6
6	(Zimbabwe) C Black (Australia) P Hanley	6^{2}	1

Quarterfinals
1	(Slovenia) K Srebotnik (Serbia) N Zimonjić	6	6
(Ukraine) K Bondarenko (Australia) J Kerr	3	3
WC	(France) V Razzano (Netherlands) R Wassen	2	4
(China) J Zheng (India) M Bhupathi	6	6

Semifinals
1	(Slovenia) K Srebotnik (Serbia) N Zimonjić	w/o
(China) J Zheng (India) M Bhupathi

=== Bottom half ===
First round
5	(China) Z Yan (The Bahamas) M Knowles	6	6^{6}	[12]
(Belarus) T Poutchek (Austria) J Knowle	3	7	[10]
(Denmark) C Wozniacki (Poland) M Matkowski	0	6	[9]
(United States) L Huber (United Kingdom) J Murray	6	4	[11]
WC	(France) P Parmentier (France) T Ascione	4	2
(Czech Republic) V Uhlířová (Poland) M Fyrstenberg	6	6
(Australia) R Stubbs (Sweden) R Lindstedt	6	2	0^{r}
3	(Belarus) V Azarenka (United States) B Bryan	1	6	1
8	(Australia) A Molik (Sweden) J Björkman	3	4
(Slovakia) J Husárová (Brazil) A Sá	6	6
WC	(France) S Foretz (France) É Roger-Vasselin	1	6	[7]
(United States) B Mattek (Zimbabwe) K Ullyett	6	4	[10]
WC	(France) C Pin (France) G Simon	6	6
(Chinese Taipei) Y-j Chan (United States) E Butorac	3	3
Alt	(Czech Republic) I Benešová (Czech Republic) F Čermák	2	4
2	(Czech Republic) K Peschke (Czech Republic) P Vízner	6	6

Second round
5	(China) Z Yan (The Bahamas) M Knowles
(United States) L Huber (United Kingdom) J Murray	w/o
(Czech Republic) V Uhlířová (Poland) M Fyrstenberg	6^{5}	3
3	(Belarus) V Azarenka (United States) B Bryan	7	6
(Slovakia) J Husárová (Brazil) A Sá	1	6	[10]
(United States) B Mattek (Zimbabwe) K Ullyett	6	3	[6]
WC	(France) C Pin (France) G Simon	3	4
2	(Czech Republic) K Peschke (Czech Republic) P Vízner	6	6

Quarterfinals
(United States) L Huber (United Kingdom) J Murray	0	6^{5}
3	(Belarus) V Azarenka (United States) B Bryan	6	7
(Slovakia) J Husárová (Brazil) A Sá	5	4
2	(Czech Republic) K Peschke (Czech Republic) P Vízner	7	6

Semifinals
3	(Belarus) V Azarenka (United States) B Bryan	4	6	[10]
2	(Czech Republic) K Peschke (Czech Republic) P Vízner	6	3	[8]
