= 2008 French Open – Wheelchair women's doubles =

Wheelchair women's doubles
- 2008 French Open

Final
- Champions: (Netherlands) Jiske Griffioen (Netherlands) Esther Vergeer
- Runners-up: (Netherlands) Korie Homan (Netherlands) Sharon Walraven
- Score: 6–4, 6–4

Events
Singles	men	women		boys	girls
Doubles	men	women	mixed	boys	girls
WC Singles	men	women	quad
WC Doubles	men	women	quad
Legends	−45	45+	women
- French Open

Defending champion Esther Vergeer and her partner Jiske Griffioen defeated Korie Homan and Sharon Walraven in the final, 6–4, 6–4 to win the women's doubles wheelchair tennis title at the 2008 French Open.

Maaike Smit and Vergeer were the reigning champions, but Smit chose not to participate.

== Seeds ==
1. (Netherlands) Jiske Griffioen / (Netherlands) Esther Vergeer (champions)
2. (Netherlands) Korie Homan / (Netherlands) Sharon Walraven (final)

== Draw ==
Key

- Q = Qualifier
- WC = Wild card
- LL = Lucky loser
- Alt = Alternate
- ITF = ITF entry
- PR = Protected ranking
- SR = Special ranking
- SE = Special exempt
- JE = Junior exempt
- JR = Junior Accelerator Programme entrant
- CO = College Accelerator Programme entrant
- NG = Next Gen Accelerator Program entrant
- w/o = Walkover
- r = Retired
- d = Defaulted

=== Finals ===
Semifinals
1	(Netherlands) Jiske Griffioen (Netherlands) Esther Vergeer	6	6
(Italy) Marianna Lauro (Netherlands) Aniek Van Koot	1	1
(France) Florence Gravellier (United Kingdom) Lucy Shuker	5	4
2	(Netherlands) Korie Homan (Netherlands) Sharon Walraven	7	6

Final
1	(Netherlands) Jiske Griffioen (Netherlands) Esther Vergeer	6	6
2	(Netherlands) Korie Homan (Netherlands) Sharon Walraven	4	4
