= Richard Becker (tennis) =

German tennis player (born 1991)

- Country (sports): Germany
- Residence: Frankfurt, Germany
- Born: 29 January 1991 (age 35)
- Height: 1.98 m (6 ft 6 in)
- Turned pro: 2011
- Retired: 2015
- Plays: Right-handed (two-handed backhand)
- Prize money: $51,696

Singles
- Career record: 0-0
- Career titles: 0
- Highest ranking: No. 336 (11 May 2017)

Grand Slam singles results
- Australian Open Junior: QF (2009)
- French Open Junior: QF (2009)
- Wimbledon Junior: Q1 (2009)
- US Open Junior: 1R (2008, 2009)

Doubles
- Career record: 0–1
- Career titles: 0
- Highest ranking: No. 477 (27 October 2014)

Grand Slam doubles results
- Australian Open Junior: 1R (2009)
- French Open Junior: 1R (2009)
- US Open Junior: 1R (2009)

Richard Becker (German pronunciation: [ˈʁɪçaʁt ˈbɛkɐ]; born 29 January 1991) is a former German professional tennis player.

== Career ==
He trains at the Schüttler Waske Tennis-University. His favourite surface is clay.
