= 2008 French Open – Girls' doubles =

Girls' doubles
- 2008 French Open

Final
- Champion: (Slovenia) Polona Hercog (Australia) Jessica Moore
- Runner-up: (Netherlands) Lesley Kerkhove (Netherlands) Arantxa Rus
- Score: 5–7, 6–1, [10–7]

Events
Singles	men	women		boys	girls
Doubles	men	women	mixed	boys	girls
WC Singles	men	women	quad
WC Doubles	men	women	quad
Legends	−45	45+	women
← 2007 ·	French Open	· 2009 →

Ksenia Milevskaya and Urszula Radwańska were the defending champions, but did not compete in the juniors that year.

Polona Hercog and Jessica Moore won the tournament, defeating Lesley Kerkhove and Arantxa Rus in the final, 5–7, 6–1, [10–7].

== Seeds ==
1. (Romania) Elena Bogdan / (Romania) Simona Halep (first round)
2. (Thailand) Noppawan Lertcheewakarn / (Indonesia) Jessy Rompies (quarterfinals)
3. (Russia) Ksenia Lykina / (Japan) Kurumi Nara (second round)
4. (United States) Mallory Burdette / (United States) Melanie Oudin (quarterfinals)
5. (Romania) Alexandra Damaschin / (Serbia) Bojana Jovanovski (second round)
6. (United Kingdom) Jade Curtis / (Australia) Nikola Hofmanova (semifinals)
7. (Netherlands) Lesley Kerkhove / (Netherlands) Arantxa Rus (final)
8. (Slovenia) Polona Hercog / (Australia) Jessica Moore (champions)

== Draw ==
=== Key ===
- Q = Qualifier
- WC = Wild card
- LL = Lucky loser
- Alt = Alternate
- SE = Special exempt
- PR = Protected ranking
- ITF = ITF entry
- JE = Junior exempt
- w/o = Walkover
- r = Retired
- d = Defaulted
- SR = Special ranking

=== Finals ===
Semifinals
8	(Slovenia) Polona Hercog (Australia) Jessica Moore	6	6
(Slovakia) Lenka Juríková (Slovakia) Romana Tabak	1	1
6	(United Kingdom) Jade Curtis (Austria) Nikola Hofmanova	1	1
7	(Netherlands) Lesley Kerkhove (Netherlands) Arantxa Rus	6	6

Final
8	(Slovenia) Polona Hercog (Australia) Jessica Moore	5	6	[10]
7	(Netherlands) Lesley Kerkhove (Netherlands) Arantxa Rus	7	1	[7]

=== Top half ===
First round
1	(Romania) E Bogdan (Romania) S Halep	7	6^{6}	[8]
(Russia) V Savinykh (Russia) M Sirotkina	6^{5}	7	[10]
(Peru) B Botto (Kazakhstan) Z Diyas
(Australia) I Holland (Poland) S Zaniewska	w/o
WC	(France) C Babet (France) C Rodier	6	7
(Uzbekistan) A Kolesnichenko (India) P Venkatesh	2	5
(Japan) M Doi (Japan) M Inoue	1	1
8	(Slovenia) P Hercog (Australia) J Moore	6	6
3	(Russia) K Lykina (Japan) K Nara	6	6
(Argentina) A Salut (Japan) A Yamasoto	2	2
(Italy) A Grymalska (Australia) S Peers	4	6	[10]
(Slovakia) K Boczová (France) C Chala	6	1	[7]
(Indonesia) B Gumulya (Netherlands) R Hogenkamp	6	6^{5}	[6]
(Slovakia) L Juríková (Slovakia) R Tabak	2	7	[10]
WC	(France) N Mohn (France) C Sapene	1	3
5	(Romania) A Damaschin (Serbia) B Jovanovski	6	6

Second round
(Russia) V Savinykh (Russia) M Sirotkina	6	6
(Australia) I Holland (Poland) S Zaniewska	4	3
WC	(France) C Babet (France) C Rodier	6^{5}	6^{5}
8	(Slovenia) P Hercog (Australia) J Moore	7	7
3	(Russia) K Lykina (Japan) K Nara	7	3	[5]
(Italy) A Grymalska (Australia) S Peers	6^{5}	6	[10]
(Slovakia) L Juríková (Slovakia) R Tabak	6	4	[10]
5	(Romania) A Damaschin (Serbia) B Jovanovski	4	6	[5]

Quarterfinals
(Russia) V Savinykh (Russia) M Sirotkina	7	4	[8]
8	(Slovenia) P Hercog (Australia) J Moore	6^{4}	6	[10]
(Italy) A Grymalska (Australia) S Peers	2	3
(Slovakia) L Juríková (Slovakia) R Tabak	6	6

Semifinals
8	(Slovenia) P Hercog (Australia) J Moore	6	6
(Slovakia) L Juríková (Slovakia) R Tabak	1	1

=== Bottom half ===
First round
6	(United Kingdom) J Curtis (Austria) N Hofmanova	7	5	[10]
(Ukraine) M Malkhasyan (Hungary) Z Susányi	6^{7}	7	[5]
(Germany) L Berlinecke (Switzerland) N Riner	6	6
(Morocco) N Lalami (Hong Kong) Z-j Yang	3	3
(Romania) I-C Begu (Russia) E Chernyakova	1	6^{2}
(Czech Republic) Z Linhová (Slovakia) Z Luknárová	6	7
WC	(France) J Gervais (France) A Goncalves	4	6^{6}
4	(United States) M Burdette (United States) M Oudin	6	7
7	(Netherlands) L Kerkhove (Netherlands) A Rus	6	6
(Ukraine) L Kichenok (Ukraine) N Kichenok	1	1
(Hungary) T Babos (Hungary) R-L Jani	w/o
WC	(France) A Hesse (France) K Mladenovic
(Belarus) A Orlik (Serbia) M Špremo	6	6^{6}	[10]
(Australia) J Konta (Canada) R Marino	3	7	[2]
(South Africa) M Gorny (Russia) V Kamenskaya	0	2
2	(Thailand) N Lertcheewakarn (Indonesia) J Rompies	6	6

Second round
6	(United Kingdom) J Curtis (Austria) N Hofmanova	w/o
(Germany) L Berlinecke (Switzerland) N Riner
(Czech Republic) Z Linhová (Slovakia) Z Luknárová	3	6^{2}
4	(United States) M Burdette (United States) M Oudin	6	7
7	(Netherlands) L Kerkhove (Netherlands) A Rus	6	4	[10]
(Hungary) T Babos (Hungary) R-L Jani	2	6	[6]
(Belarus) A Orlik (Serbia) M Špremo	6	0	[5]
2	(Thailand) N Lertcheewakarn (Indonesia) J Rompies	4	6	[10]

Quarterfinals
6	(United Kingdom) J Curtis (Austria) N Hofmanova	6	7
4	(United States) M Burdette (United States) M Oudin	2	5
7	(Netherlands) L Kerkhove (Netherlands) A Rus	4	6	[11]
2	(Thailand) N Lertcheewakarn (Indonesia) J Rompies	6	4	[9]

Semifinals
6	(United Kingdom) J Curtis (Austria) N Hofmanova	1	1
7	(Netherlands) L Kerkhove (Netherlands) A Rus	6	6
