= 2008 French Open – Legends under 45 doubles =

Legends under 45 doubles
- 2008 French Open

Final
- Champions: (Croatia) Goran Ivanišević (Germany) Michael Stich
- Runners-up: (Netherlands) Richard Krajicek (Spain) Emilio Sánchez
- Score: 6–1, 7–6(5)

Events
Singles	men	women		boys	girls
Doubles	men	women	mixed	boys	girls
WC Singles	men	women	quad
WC Doubles	men	women	quad
Legends	−45	45+	women
← 2007 ·	French Open	· 2009 →

Arnaud Boetsch and Guy Forget were the defending champions, but lost in the round robin.

Goran Ivanišević and Michael Stich won in the final 6–1, 7–6(5), against Richard Krajicek and Emilio Sánchez.

== Draw ==
=== Key ===
- Q = Qualifier
- WC = Wild card
- LL = Lucky loser
- Alt = Alternate
- ITF = ITF entry
- PR = Protected ranking
- SR = Special ranking
- SE = Special exempt
- JE = Junior exempt
- JR = Junior Accelerator Programme entrant
- CO = College Accelerator Programme entrant
- NG = Next Gen Accelerator Program entrant
- w/o = Walkover
- r = Retired
- d = Defaulted

=== Final ===
Final
(Croatia) Goran Ivanišević (Germany) Michael Stich	6	7
(Netherlands) Richard Krajicek (Spain) Emilio Sánchez	1	6^{5}

=== Group A ===
	(Croatia) Ivansevic (Germany) Stich	(Germany) Becker (France) Pioline	(Spain) Bruguera (Australia) Cash	RR; W–L	Set; W–L	Game; W–L	Standings
(Croatia) Goran Ivanišević (Germany) Michael Stich		1–6, 6–3, 10–8	7–6(3), 6–3	2–0	4–1	21–18	1
(Germany) Boris Becker (France) Cédric Pioline	6–1, 3–6, 8–10		7–6(7), 6–2	1–1	3–2	22–16	2
(Spain) Sergi Bruguera (Australia) Pat Cash	6–7(3), 3–6	6–7(7), 2–6		0–2	0–4	17–26	3

Standings are determined by: 1. number of wins; 2. number of matches; 3. in three-players-ties, percentage of sets won, or of games won; 4. steering-committee decision.

=== Group B ===
	(Netherlands) Krajicek (Spain) Sánchez	(France) Boetsch (France) Forget	(Sweden) Wilander (Australia) Woodbridge	RR; W–L	Set; W–L	Game; W–L	Standings
(Netherlands) Richard Krajicek (Spain) Emilio Sánchez		6–7(1), 6–2, 10–8	6–1, 5–7, 10–8	2–0	4–2	25–17	1
(France) Arnaud Boetsch (France) Guy Forget	7–6(1), 2–6, 8–10		6–3, 6–4	1–1	3–2	21–20	2
(Sweden) Mats Wilander (Australia) Todd Woodbridge	6–1, 5–7, 8–10	3–6, 4–6		0–2	1–4	18–21	3

Standings are determined by: 1. number of wins; 2. number of matches; 3. in three-players-ties, percentage of sets won, or of games won; 4. steering-committee decision.
