= Patrik Brydolf =

Swedish tennis player

- Country (sports): Sweden
- Born: 27 November 1991 (age 33) Stockholm, Sweden
- Plays: Right-handed
- Prize money: $46,935

Singles
- Career record: 0–0 (at ATP Tour level, Grand Slam level, and in Davis Cup)
- Career titles: 0 ITF
- Highest ranking: No. 523 (15 August 2011)

Doubles
- Career record: 0–4 (at ATP Tour level, Grand Slam level, and in Davis Cup)
- Career titles: 4 ITF
- Highest ranking: No. 348 (12 September 2011)

Patrik Brydolf (born 27 November 1991) is a Swedish tennis player.

Brydolf has a career high ATP singles ranking of 523 achieved on 15 August 2011. He also has a career high ATP doubles ranking of 348 achieved on 12 September 2011.

Brydolf made his ATP main draw debut at the 2008 If Stockholm Open in the doubles draw partnering Daniel Berta.

== ITF Futures titles ==
=== Doubles: 4 ===
| No. | Date | Tournament | Surface | Partner | Opponents | Score |
|---|---|---|---|---|---|---|
| 1. | Oct 2010 | Turkey F13, Antalya | Clay | (Finland) Micke Kontinen | (Romania) Adrian Cruciat (Turkey) Anıl Yüksel | 6–3, 6–4 |
| 2. | Nov 2010 | Turkey F15, Antalya | Clay | (Serbia) Ivan Bjelica | (Bulgaria) Tihomir Grozdanov (Bulgaria) Alexandar Lazov | 6–7^{(1–7)}, 6–4, [10–8] |
| 3. | Jan 2011 | Turkey F3, Antalya | Hard | (United Kingdom) David Rice | (Russia) Igor Karpov (Russia) Ilia Starkov | 3–6, 6–1, [10–5] |
| 4. | Jun 2011 | Italy F15, Viterbo | Clay | (Poland) Adam Chadaj | (Italy) Federico Torresi (Italy) Luca Vanni | 6–2, 1–6, [10–8] |
