= 2008 French Open – Legends over 45 doubles =

Legends over 45 doubles
- 2008 French Open

Final
- Champions: (Sweden) Anders Järryd (United States) John McEnroe
- Runners-up: (Iran) Mansour Bahrami (France) Henri Leconte
- Score: 6–4, 7–6(2)

Events
Singles	men	women		boys	girls
Doubles	men	women	mixed	boys	girls
WC Singles	men	women	quad
WC Doubles	men	women	quad
Legends	−45	45+	women
← 2007 ·	French Open	· 2009 →

Anders Järryd and John McEnroe were the defending champions, and won in the final 6–4, 7–6(2), against Mansour Bahrami and Henri Leconte.

== Draw ==
=== Key ===
- Q = Qualifier
- WC = Wild card
- LL = Lucky loser
- Alt = Alternate
- ITF = ITF entry
- PR = Protected ranking
- SR = Special ranking
- SE = Special exempt
- JE = Junior exempt
- JR = Junior Accelerator Programme entrant
- CO = College Accelerator Programme entrant
- NG = Next Gen Accelerator Program entrant
- w/o = Walkover
- r = Retired
- d = Defaulted

=== Final ===
Final
(Sweden) Anders Järryd (United States) John McEnroe	6	7
(Iran) Mansour Bahrami (France) Henri Leconte	4	6^{2}

=== Group A ===
	(Sweden) Järryd (United States) McEnroe	(Romania) Năstase (Sweden) Pernfors	(Ecuador) Gómez (Australia) McNamara	RR; W–L	Set; W–L	Game; W–L	Standings
(Sweden) Anders Järryd (United States) John McEnroe		6–2, 6–1	6–4, 6–1	2–0	4–0	24–8	1
(Romania) Ilie Năstase (Sweden) Mikael Pernfors	2–6, 1–6		1–6, 4–6	0–2	0–4	8–24	3
(Ecuador) Andrés Gómez (Australia) Peter McNamara	4–6, 1–6	6–1, 6–4		1–1	2–2	17–17	2

Standings are determined by: 1. number of wins; 2. number of matches; 3. in three-players-ties, percentage of sets won, or of games won; 4. steering-committee decision.

=== Group B ===
	(Iran) Bahrami (France) Leconte	(Australia) Fitzgerald (Argentina) Vilas	(Paraguay) Pecci (Mexico) Ramírez	RR; W–L	Set; W–L	Game; W–L	Standings
(Iran) Mansour Bahrami (France) Henri Leconte		6–3, 6–4	6–4, 7–5	2–0	4–0	25–16	1
(Australia) John Fitzgerald (Argentina) Guillermo Vilas	3–6, 4–6		6–4, 6–3	1–1	2–2	19–19	2
(Paraguay) Víctor Pecci (Mexico) Raúl Ramírez	4–6, 5–7	4–6, 3–6		0–2	0–4	16–25	3

Standings are determined by: 1. number of wins; 2. number of matches; 3. in three-players-ties, percentage of sets won, or of games won; 4. steering-committee decision.
