= 2008 French Open – Wheelchair women's singles =

Wheelchair women's singles
- 2008 French Open

Final
- Champion: (Netherlands) Esther Vergeer
- Runner-up: (Netherlands) Korie Homan
- Score: 6–2, 6–2

Events
Singles	men	women		boys	girls
Doubles	men	women	mixed	boys	girls
WC Singles	men	women	quad
WC Doubles	men	women	quad
Legends	−45	45+	women
- French Open

Defending champion Esther Vergeer defeated Korie Homan in the final, 6–2, 6–2 to win the women's singles wheelchair tennis title at the 2008 French Open.

== Seeds ==
1. (Netherlands) Esther Vergeer (champion)
2. (Netherlands) Korie Homan (final)

== Draw ==
Key

- Q = Qualifier
- WC = Wild card
- LL = Lucky loser
- Alt = Alternate
- ITF = ITF entry
- PR = Protected ranking
- SR = Special ranking
- SE = Special exempt
- JE = Junior exempt
- JR = Junior Accelerator Programme entrant
- CO = College Accelerator Programme entrant
- NG = Next Gen Accelerator Program entrant
- w/o = Walkover
- r = Retired
- d = Defaulted

=== Finals ===
Quarterfinals
1	(Netherlands) Esther Vergeer	6	6
(Netherlands) Jiske Griffioen	2	1
(Netherlands) Aniek Van Koot	6	6
(United Kingdom) Lucy Shuker	3	3
(Netherlands) Sharon Walraven	7	4	3
(France) Florence Gravellier	5	6	6
WC	(Italy) Marianna Lauro	1	3
2	(Netherlands) Korie Homan	6	6

Semifinals
1	(Netherlands) Esther Vergeer	6	6
(Netherlands) Aniek Van Koot	1	1
(France) Florence Gravellier	4	4
2	(Netherlands) Korie Homan	6	6

Final
1	(Netherlands) Esther Vergeer	6	6
2	(Netherlands) Korie Homan	2	2
