= 2008 French Open – Boys' doubles =

Boys' doubles
- 2008 French Open

Final
- Champions: (Finland) Henri Kontinen (Indonesia) Christopher Rungkat
- Runners-up: (Germany) Jaan-Frederik Brunken (Australia) Matt Reid
- Score: 6–0, 6–3

Events
Singles	men	women		boys	girls
Doubles	men	women	mixed	boys	girls
WC Singles	men	women	quad
WC Doubles	men	women	quad
Legends	−45	45+	women
- French Open

Thomas Fabbiano and Andrei Karatchenia were the defending champions, but did not compete in the Juniors that year.

Henri Kontinen and Christopher Rungkat won in the final 6–0, 6–3, against Jaan-Frederik Brunken and Matt Reid.

== Seeds ==
1. (Brazil) Henrique Cunha / (Mexico) César Ramírez (first round)
2. (United States) Ryan Harrison / (United States) Bradley Klahn (first round)
3. (Belgium) Alexandre Folie / (Belgium) David Goffin (first round)
4. (Australia) Andrew Thomas / (Australia) Bernard Tomic (first round)
5. (El Salvador) Marcelo Arévalo / (China) Di Wu (first round)
6. (Zimbabwe) Takanyi Garanganga / (Thailand) Kittiphong Wachiramanowong (first round)
7. (India) Yuki Bhambri / (Serbia) Ilija Vucic (second round)
8. (South Korea) Soong-jae Cho / (Thailand) Peerakit Siributwong (first round)

== Draw ==
Key

- Q = Qualifier
- WC = Wild card
- LL = Lucky loser
- Alt = Alternate
- ITF = ITF entry
- PR = Protected ranking
- SR = Special ranking
- SE = Special exempt
- JE = Junior exempt
- JR = Junior Accelerator Programme entrant
- CO = College Accelerator Programme entrant
- NG = Next Gen Accelerator Program entrant
- w/o = Walkover
- r = Retired
- d = Defaulted

=== Final four teams ===
Semifinals
(Finland) Henri Kontinen (Indonesia) Christopher Rungkat	7	6
(Canada) Vasek Pospisil (Canada) Milos Raonic	6^{3}	2
(France) Julien Obry (France) Adrien Puget	6	3	[6]
(Germany) J-F Brunken (Australia) Matt Reid	1	6	[10]

Final
(Finland) Henri Kontinen (Indonesia) Christopher Rungkat	6	6
(Germany) J-F Brunken (Australia) Matt Reid	0	3

=== Top half ===
First round
1	(Brazil) Henrique Cunha (Mexico) César Ramírez	6^{5}	1
(Finland) Henri Kontinen (Indonesia) Christopher Rungkat	7	6
WC	(France) Romain Sichez (France) Tak Khunn Wang	6	6
ALT	(United Kingdom) Niall Angus (Italy) Lorenzo Papasidero	1	1
(Russia) Alexei Grigorov (Austria) Nikolaus Moser	4	3
(Chinese Taipei) Cheng-peng Hsieh (Chinese Taipei) Tsung-hua Yang	6	6
(Australia) Jared Easton (Australia) Mark Verryth	3	7	[10]
8	(South Korea) Soong-jae Cho (Thailand) Peerakit Siributwong	6	5	[7]
3	(Belgium) Alexandre Folie (Belgium) David Goffin	1	4
(Romania) Marius Copil (Belgium) Yannik Reuter	6	6
(Canada) Vasek Pospisil (Canada) Milos Raonic	6	7
(United States) Chase Buchanan (United States) Jarmere Jenkins	3	6^{4}
(United Kingdom) Neil Pauffley (United Kingdom) Marcus Willis	6^{3}	3
(Brazil) José Pereira (Chile) Cristóbal Saavedra Corvalán	7	6
(France) Axel Michon (France) Guillaume Rufin	6	6
6	(Zimbabwe) Takanyi Garanganga (Thailand) Kittiphong Wachiramanowong	4	0

Second round
(Finland) H Kontinen (Indonesia) C Rungkat	6	6
WC	(France) R Sichez (France) TK Wang	4	2
(Chinese Taipei) C-p Hsieh (Chinese Taipei) T-h Yang	6	6
(Australia) J Easton (Australia) M Verryth	3	4
(Romania) M Copil (Belgium) Y Reuter	3	4
(Canada) V Pospisil (Canada) M Raonic	6	6
(Brazil) J Pereira (Chile) C Saavedra-Corvalán	1	1
(France) A Michon (France) G Rufin	6	6

Quarterfinals
(Finland) H Kontinen (Indonesia) C Rungkat	6	6
(Chinese Taipei) C-p Hsieh (Chinese Taipei) T-h Yang	4	4
(Canada) V Pospisil (Canada) M Raonic	6	6
(France) A Michon (France) G Rufin	1	1

Semifinals
(Finland) H Kontinen (Indonesia) C Rungkat	7	6
(Canada) V Pospisil (Canada) M Raonic	6^{3}	2

=== Bottom half ===
First round
7	(India) Yuki Bhambri (Serbia) Ilija Vucic	7	6
(Italy) Giacomo Miccini (Slovenia) Borut Puc	5	3
(United Kingdom) Daniel Cox (Netherlands) Timonthy Van Terheijden	3	5
(France) Julien Obry (France) Adrien Puget	6	7
WC	(France) Romain Arneodo (France) Constantin Belot	3	5
(Israel) Gilad Ben Zvi (Germany) Cedrik-Marcel Stebe	6	7
(Argentina) Guido Pella (Argentina) Juan Vázquez-Valenzuela	6	3	[12]
4	(Australia) Andrew Thomas (Australia) Bernard Tomic	4	6	[10]
5	(El Salvador) Marcelo Arévalo (China) Di Wu	4	6	[5]
(Dominican Republic) José Hernández (United Kingdom) Thomas Knights	6	4	[10]
(Germany) J-F Brunken (Australia) Matt Reid	3	6	[10]
WC	(France) Albano Olivetti (France) Joachim Sternbach	6	3	[3]
(United Kingdom) Daniel Evans (United Kingdom) Daniel Smethurst	7	6
(Russia) Evgeny Donskoy (Russia) Andrey Kuznetsov	6^{6}	3
(Bosnia and Herzegovina) Mirza Bašić (Croatia) Marin Draganja	7	6
2	(United States) Ryan Harrison (United States) Bradley Klahn	6^{1}	2

Second round
7	(India) Y Bhambri (Serbia) I Vucic	3	3
(France) J Obry (France) A Puget	6	6
(Israel) G Ben Zvi (Germany) C-M Stebe	6	4	[3]
(Argentina) G Pella (Argentina) J Vázquez-Valenzuela	4	6	[10]
(Dominican Republic) J Hernández (United Kingdom) T Knights	1	6^{1}
(Germany) J-F Brunken (Australia) M Reid	6	7
(United Kingdom) D Evans (United Kingdom) D Smethurst	6	6
(Bosnia and Herzegovina) M Bašić (Croatia) M Draganja	3	2

Quarterfinals
(France) J Obry (France) A Puget	6	6
(Argentina) G Pella (Argentina) J Vázquez-Valenzuela	4	4
(Germany) J-F Brunken (Australia) M Reid	6^{3}	6	[10]
(United Kingdom) D Evans (United Kingdom) D Smethurst	7	1	[6]

Semifinals
(France) J Obry (France) A Puget	6	3	[6]
(Germany) J-F Brunken (Australia) M Reid	1	6	[10]
