= 2008 French Open – Wheelchair men's singles =

Wheelchair men's singles
- 2008 French Open

Final
- Champion: (Japan) Shingo Kunieda
- Runner-up: (Netherlands) Robin Ammerlaan
- Score: 6–0, 7–6^{(7–5)}

Events
Singles	men	women		boys	girls
Doubles	men	women	mixed	boys	girls
WC Singles	men	women	quad
WC Doubles	men	women	quad
Legends	−45	45+	women
- French Open

Defending champion Shingo Kunieda defeated Robin Ammerlaan in the final, 6–0, 7–6^{(7–5)} to win the men's singles wheelchair tennis title at the 2008 French Open. It was his second French Open singles title and fifth major singles title overall.

== Seeds ==
1. (Japan) Shingo Kunieda (champion)
2. (Netherlands) Robin Ammerlaan (final)

== Draw ==
Key

- Q = Qualifier
- WC = Wild card
- LL = Lucky loser
- Alt = Alternate
- ITF = ITF entry
- PR = Protected ranking
- SR = Special ranking
- SE = Special exempt
- JE = Junior exempt
- JR = Junior Accelerator Programme entrant
- CO = College Accelerator Programme entrant
- NG = Next Gen Accelerator Program entrant
- w/o = Walkover
- r = Retired
- d = Defaulted

=== Finals ===
Quarterfinals
1	(Japan) Shingo Kunieda	6	6
WC	(France) Nicolas Peifer	3	1
(Netherlands) Ronald Vink	7	6
(Sweden) Stefan Olsson	6^{3}	0
(Austria) Martin Legner	6	7
(Netherlands) Maikel Scheffers	4	5
(France) Stéphane Houdet	6^{2}	1
2	(Netherlands) Robin Ammerlaan	7	6

Semifinals
1	(Japan) Shingo Kunieda	7	6
(Netherlands) Ronald Vink	6^{5}	2
(Austria) Martin Legner	3	3
2	(Netherlands) Robin Ammerlaan	6	6

Final
1	(Japan) Shingo Kunieda	6	7
2	(Netherlands) Robin Ammerlaan	0	6^{5}
