= 2009 French Open – Girls' singles =

Girls' singles
- 2009 French Open

Final
- Champion: (France) Kristina Mladenovic
- Runner-up: (Russia) Daria Gavrilova
- Score: 6–3, 6–2

Events
Singles	men	women		boys	girls
Doubles	men	women	mixed	boys	girls
WC Singles	men	women	quad
WC Doubles	men	women	quad
Legends	−45	45+	women
- French Open

Kristina Mladenovic won the title, defeating Daria Gavrilova in the final, 6–3, 6–2.

Simona Halep was the defending champion, but chose not to participate. She received a wildcard into the women's singles qualifying competition where she lost to Vitalia Diatchenko in the second round.

== Seeds ==
1. (United Kingdom) Laura Robson (second round)
2. (Romania) Ana Bogdan (first round)
3. (Russia) Ksenia Pervak (semifinals)
4. (Hungary) Tímea Babos (third round)
5. (Thailand) Noppawan Lertcheewakarn (first round)
6. (Croatia) Ajla Tomljanović (third round)
7. (United States) Lauren Embree (first round)
8. (Romania) Elena Bogdan (third round)
9. (France) Kristina Mladenovic (champion)
10. (Chile) Camila Silva (first round)
11. (Croatia) Silvia Njirić (quarterfinals)
12. (Australia) Olivia Rogowska (second round)
13. (United Kingdom) Heather Watson (first round)
14. (United States) Christina McHale (third round)
15. (United States) Sloane Stephens (semifinals)
16. (Paraguay) Verónica Cepede Royg (second round)

== Draw ==
Key

- Q = Qualifier
- WC = Wild card
- LL = Lucky loser
- Alt = Alternate
- ITF = ITF entry
- PR = Protected ranking
- SR = Special ranking
- SE = Special exempt
- JE = Junior exempt
- JR = Junior Accelerator Programme entrant
- CO = College Accelerator Programme entrant
- NG = Next Gen Accelerator Program entrant
- w/o = Walkover
- r = Retired
- d = Defaulted

=== Finals ===
Quarterfinals
(South Africa) Chanel Simmonds	6^{2}	2
9	(France) Kristina Mladenovic	7^{7}	6
15/Q	(United States) Sloane Stephens	6	6
11	(Croatia) Silvia Njirić	2	2
(Russia) Valeria Solovyeva	2	5
3	(Russia) Ksenia Pervak	6	7
Q	(Peru) Bianca Botto	4	6	2
(Russia) Daria Gavrilova	6	2	6

Semifinals
9	(France) Kristina Mladenovic	7	6
15/Q	(United States) Sloane Stephens	5	3
3	(Russia) Ksenia Pervak	6	6^{3}	2
(Russia) Daria Gavrilova	4	7^{7}	6

Final
9	(France) Kristina Mladenovic	6	6
(Russia) Daria Gavrilova	3	2

=== Top half ===
==== Section 1 ====
First round
1	(United Kingdom) Laura Robson	2	6	6
(Russia) Karina Pimkina	6	3	3
WC	(France) Léolia Jeanjean	1	2
(Poland) Sandra Zaniewska	6	6
(Canada) Katarena Paliivets	2	1
(South Africa) Chanel Simmonds	6	6
(Ukraine) Maryna Zanevska	2	5
16	(Paraguay) Verónica Cepede Royg	6	7
9	(France) Kristina Mladenovic	6	6
Q	(Germany) Sina Haas	0	1
(Serbia) Tamara Čurović	7	2	1
(Slovakia) Jana Čepelová	5	6	6
(Russia) Yana Buchina	6	6
(Australia) Isabella Holland	4	2
(Slovenia) Nastja Kolar	6	7^{7}
7	(United States) Lauren Embree	3	6^{5}

Second round
1	(United Kingdom) L Robson	6^{10}	6	3
(Poland) S Zaniewska	7^{12}	1	6
(South Africa) C Simmonds	6	6
16	(Paraguay) V Cepede Royg	1	3
9	(France) K Mladenovic	6	6
(Slovakia) J Čepelová	1	3
(Russia) Y Buchina	7	4	4
(Slovenia) N Kolar	5	6	6

Third round
(Poland) S Zaniewska	4	2
(South Africa) C Simmonds	6	6
9	(France) K Mladenovic	6	6
(Slovenia) N Kolar	0	3

Quarterfinals
(South Africa) C Simmonds	6^{2}	2
9	(France) K Mladenovic	7^{7}	6

==== Section 2 ====
First round
4	(Hungary) Tímea Babos	7	6
(United Kingdom) Hannah James	5	3
(Russia) Ksenia Kirillova	6	7
WC	(France) Cindy Chala	3	5
(Russia) Irina Khromacheva	0	2
(Belgium) An-Sophie Mestach	6	6
(Netherlands) Quirine Lemoine	1	1
15/Q	(United States) Sloane Stephens	6	6
11	(Croatia) Silvia Njirić	6	6
Q	(France) Caroline Garcia	3	1
WC	(Russia) Daria Salnikova	6	3	8
(Mexico) Alejandra Granillo	4	6	6
Q	(Belarus) Anna Orlik	6	6
(Russia) Polina Leykina	3	2
(Indonesia) Grace Sari Ysidora	1	1
8	(Romania) Elena Bogdan	6	6

Second round
4	(Hungary) T Babos	6^{3}	6	7
(Russia) K Kirillova	7^{7}	2	5
(Belgium) A-S Mestach	2	1
15/Q	(United States) S Stephens	6	6
11	(Croatia) S Njirić	6	6
WC	(Russia) D Salnikova	3	4
Q	(Belarus) A Orlik	2	3
8	(Romania) E Bogdan	6	6

Third round
4	(Hungary) T Babos	4	6	4
15/Q	(United States) S Stephens	6	2	6
11	(Croatia) S Njirić	7	6
8	(Romania) E Bogdan	5	0

Quarterfinals
15/Q	(United States) S Stephens	6	6
11	(Croatia) S Njirić	2	2

=== Bottom half ===
==== Section 3 ====
First round
5	(Thailand) Noppawan Lertcheewakarn	4	3
(Netherlands) Richèl Hogenkamp	6	6
WC	(France) Charlotte Rodier	6^{2}	3
(United States) Beatrice Capra	7^{7}	6
(Germany) Linda Berlinecke	6	1	1
(France) Nathalie Mohn	2	6	6
(Russia) Valeria Solovyeva	6	6
10	(Chile) Camila Silva	0	2
14	(United States) Christina McHale	7^{7}	6
Q	(Italy) Martina Trevisan	6^{4}	2
WC	(France) Solène Ficheux	4	6	6
(United Kingdom) Stephanie Cornish	6	0	3
(Romania) Elora Dabija	2	4
LL	(Oman) Fatma Al-Nabhani	6	6
Q	(Slovakia) Vivien Juhászová	2	0
3	(Russia) Ksenia Pervak	6	6

Second round
(Netherlands) R Hogenkamp	1	6	4
(United States) B Capra	6	1	6
WC	(France) N Mohn	3	3
(Russia) V Solovyeva	6	6
14	(United States) C McHale	6	6
WC	(France) S Ficheux	3	1
LL	(Oman) F Al-Nabhani	7	1	8
3	(Russia) K Pervak	5	6	10

Third round
(United States) B Capra	2	4
(Russia) V Solovyeva	6	6
14	(United States) C McHale	4	6	2
3	(Russia) K Pervak	6	4	6

Quarterfinals
(Russia) V Solovyeva	2	5
3	(Russia) K Pervak	6	7

==== Section 4 ====
First round
6	(Croatia) Ajla Tomljanović	6	6
WC	(France) Clothilde de Bernardi	4	2
(Russia) Valeria Savinykh	1	3
(Serbia) Aleksandra Krunić	6	6
Q	(Peru) Bianca Botto	6	6
(Argentina) Paula Ormaechea	3	1
(Hungary) Zsófia Susányi	4	2
12	(Australia) Olivia Rogowska	6	6
13	(United Kingdom) Heather Watson	5	4
WC	(France) Gracia Radovanovic	7	6
(Russia) Daria Gavrilova	6	6
Q	(United States) Mallory Burdette	3	4
(Norway) Ulrikke Eikeri	2	1
(Kazakhstan) Zarina Diyas	6	6
(Netherlands) Lesley Kerkhove	7	6^{3}	6
2	(Romania) Ana Bogdan	5	7^{7}	1

Second round
6	(Croatia) A Tomljanović	6	6
(Serbia) A Krunić	2	2
Q	(Peru) B Botto	2	6	9
12	(Australia) O Rogowska	6	1	7
WC	(France) G Radovanovic	2	4
(Russia) D Gavrilova	6	6
(Kazakhstan) Z Diyas	6	6
(Netherlands) L Kerkhove	4	4

Third round
6	(Croatia) A Tomljanović	1	6	5
Q	(Peru) B Botto	6	3	7
(Russia) D Gavrilova	6	6
(Kazakhstan) Z Diyas	2	1

Quarterfinals
Q	(Peru) B Botto	4	6	2
(Russia) D Gavrilova	6	2	6
