= Jaan-Frederik Brunken =

Finnish-German tennis player (born 1990)

- Country (sports): Finland
- Born: 26 April 1990 (age 35) Verden, Germany
- Plays: Right-handed (two-handed backhand)
- Prize money: $46,723

Singles
- Career record: 0–0 (ATP Tour & Grand Slam level, and in Davis Cup)
- Career titles: 0
- Highest ranking: No. 469 (2 April 2012)

Doubles
- Career record: 0–0 (ATP Tour & Grand Slam level, and in Davis Cup)
- Career titles: 0
- Highest ranking: No. 567 (29 October 2012)
- Last updated on: 22 January 2013.

Jaan-Frederik Brunken (born 26 April 1990) is a Finnish-German tennis player. His highest ranking is 469th which was achieved on 2 April 2012. Currently his ATP player status is designated as "inactive" which usually indicates retirement or injury of uncertain duration. He was ranked No. 19 in the junior rankings.

In November 2012 Brunken changed his representative country from Germany to Finland. His mother is from Finland and he has citizenship in both countries.
