= 2009 French Open – Women's singles qualifying =

Women's singles qualifying
- 2009 French Open

Events
Singles	men	women		boys	girls
Doubles	men	women	mixed	boys	girls
WC Singles	men	women	quad
WC Doubles	men	women	quad
Legends	−45	45+	women

Qualification
Singles	men	women
- French Open

This draw was notable for the first ever professional appearance on the senior tour for 2018 champion Simona Halep. She received a wildcard and lost in the second round to Vitalia Diatchenko.

== Seeds ==
1. (Kazakhstan) Yaroslava Shvedova (qualified)
2. (Italy) Maria-Elena Camerin (first round)
3. (United States) Vania King (second round)
4. (Switzerland) Stefanie Vögele (second round)
5. (Canada) Stéphanie Dubois (second round)
6. (Slovenia) Maša Zec Peškirič (second round)
7. (Germany) Andrea Petkovic (first round)
8. (United Kingdom) Katie O'Brien (qualifying competition, lucky loser)
9. (Russia) Anna Lapushchenkova (first round)
10. (Germany) Tatjana Malek (qualifying competition)
11. (Italy) Alberta Brianti (second round)
12. (United States) Julie Ditty (first round)
13. (Colombia) Mariana Duque Mariño (qualifying competition, lucky loser)
14. (United States) Melanie Oudin (first round)
15. (United Kingdom) Elena Baltacha (qualifying competition)
16. (Latvia) Anastasija Sevastova (qualified)
17. (Netherlands) Michaëlla Krajicek (first round)
18. (Austria) Yvonne Meusburger (qualified)
19. (Slovenia) Andreja Klepač (first round)
20. (Portugal) Michelle Larcher de Brito (qualified)
21. (Russia) Evgeniya Rodina (qualifying competition)
22. (United States) Carly Gullickson (qualified)
23. (Japan) Kimiko Date-Krumm (first round, retired)
24. (Chinese Taipei) Hsieh Su-wei (first round)

== Qualifiers ==
1. (Kazakhstan) Yaroslava Shvedova
2. (Czech Republic) Zuzana Ondrášková
3. (Latvia) Anastasija Sevastova
4. (Slovenia) Polona Hercog
5. (South Africa) Chanelle Scheepers
6. (Russia) Vitalia Diatchenko
7. (Portugal) Michelle Larcher de Brito
8. (Netherlands) Arantxa Rus
9. (Italy) Corinna Dentoni
10. (Austria) Yvonne Meusburger
11. (Croatia) Petra Martić
12. (United States) Carly Gullickson

=== Lucky losers ===
1. (United Kingdom) Katie O'Brien
2. (Colombia) Mariana Duque Mariño

== Qualifying draw ==
Key

- Q = Qualifier
- WC = Wild card
- LL = Lucky loser
- Alt = Alternate
- ITF = ITF entry
- PR = Protected ranking
- SR = Special ranking
- SE = Special exempt
- JE = Junior exempt
- JR = Junior Accelerator Programme entrant
- CO = College Accelerator Programme entrant
- NG = Next Gen Accelerator Program entrant
- w/o = Walkover
- r = Retired
- d = Defaulted

=== First qualifier ===
First round
1	(Kazakhstan) Yaroslava Shvedova	6	6
(United States) Shenay Perry	4	4
(Slovakia) Zuzana Kučová	7	6^{4}	2
(United States) Angela Haynes	5	7^{7}	6
WC	(France) Aurélie Védy	2	4
WC	(France) Stéphanie Vongsouthi	6	6
(Greece) Anna Gerasimou	2	0
15	(United Kingdom) Elena Baltacha	6	6

Second round
1	(Kazakhstan) Yaroslava Shvedova	6	6
(United States) Angela Haynes	1	2
WC	(France) Stéphanie Vongsouthi	1	5
15	(United Kingdom) Elena Baltacha	6	7

Qualifying competition
1	(Kazakhstan) Yaroslava Shvedova	6	6
15	(United Kingdom) Elena Baltacha	2	2

=== Second qualifier ===
First round
2	(Italy) Maria-Elena Camerin	4	6^{1}
(Georgia (country)) Anna Tatishvili	6	7^{7}
(France) Florence Haring	5	3
(Germany) Carmen Klaschka	7	6
(Colombia) Catalina Castaño	2	6	6
WC	(France) Chloé Babet	6	0	3
(Czech Republic) Zuzana Ondrášková	6	6
14	(United States) Melanie Oudin	0	1

Second round
(Georgia (country)) Anna Tatishvili	2	0
(Germany) Carmen Klaschka	6	6
(Colombia) Catalina Castaño	2	6^{2}
(Czech Republic) Zuzana Ondrášková	6	7^{7}

Qualifying competition
(Germany) Carmen Klaschka	4	1
(Czech Republic) Zuzana Ondrášková	6	6

=== Third qualifier ===
First round
3	(United States) Vania King	7	3	6
(Russia) Regina Kulikova	5	6	1
(Czech Republic) Tereza Hladíková	0	4
(Russia) Nina Bratchikova	6	6
(United States) Abigail Spears	5	5
(Czech Republic) Sandra Záhlavová	7	7
(Tunisia) Selima Sfar	5	6	6
16	(Latvia) Anastasija Sevastova	7	1	8

Second round
3	(United States) Vania King	3	6	2
(Russia) Nina Bratchikova	6	3	6
(Czech Republic) Sandra Záhlavová	3	7^{9}	1
16	(Latvia) Anastasija Sevastova	6	6^{7}	6

Qualifying competition
(Russia) Nina Bratchikova	0	7	4
16	(Latvia) Anastasija Sevastova	6	5	6

=== Fourth qualifier ===
First round
4	(Switzerland) Stefanie Vögele	6	7
(Belarus) Ekaterina Dzehalevich	4	5
(Ukraine) Julia Vakulenko	4	6^{2}
(Slovenia) Polona Hercog	6	7^{7}
(Russia) Olga Puchkova	6	1	1
(Portugal) Frederica Piedade	4	6	6
(Spain) Sílvia Soler Espinosa	3	3
13	(Colombia) Mariana Duque Mariño	6	6

Second round
4	(Switzerland) Stefanie Vögele	6^{5}	6^{2}
(Slovenia) Polona Hercog	7^{7}	7^{7}
(Portugal) Frederica Piedade	3	4
13	(Colombia) Mariana Duque Mariño	6	6

Qualifying competition
(Slovenia) Polona Hercog	6^{4}	6	6
13	(Colombia) Mariana Duque Mariño	7^{7}	4	1

=== Fifth qualifier ===
First round
5	(Canada) Stéphanie Dubois	6	1	6
(Hungary) Gréta Arn	3	6	3
(Japan) Tomoko Yonemura	6	3	0
(Germany) Kathrin Wörle	3	6	6
(South Africa) Chanelle Scheepers	6	5	6
(Japan) Aiko Nakamura	4	7	1
(Italy) Romina Oprandi	6	2
23	(Japan) Kimiko Date-Krumm	4	1^{r}

Second round
(Canada) Stéphanie Dubois	6	4	1
(Germany) Kathrin Wörle	4	6	6
(South Africa) Chanelle Scheepers	3
(Italy) Romina Oprandi	0^{r}

Qualifying competition
(Germany) Kathrin Wörle	3	1
(South Africa) Chanelle Scheepers	6	6

=== Sixth qualifier ===
First round
6	(Slovenia) Maša Zec Peškirič	6	3	6
(China) Yuan Meng	0	6	3
(Bosnia and Herzegovina) Mervana Jugić-Salkić	2	4
(Romania) Irina-Camelia Begu	6	6
(Spain) Estrella Cabeza Candela	6	6^{4}	1
(Russia) Vitalia Diatchenko	4	7^{7}	6
WC	(Romania) Simona Halep	6	7
17	(Netherlands) Michaëlla Krajicek	4	5

Second round
6	(Slovenia) Maša Zec Peškirič	6	1	7
(Romania) Irina-Camelia Begu	3	6	9
(Russia) Vitalia Diatchenko	2	6	6
WC	(Romania) Simona Halep	6	1	3

Qualifying competition
(Romania) Irina-Camelia Begu	6	4	3
(Russia) Vitalia Diatchenko	2	6	6

=== Seventh qualifier ===
First round
7	(Germany) Andrea Petkovic	2	4
(Russia) Ekaterina Ivanova	6	6
(Chinese Taipei) Chan Chin-wei	2	3
(Portugal) Neuza Silva	6	6
(Ukraine) Yuliana Fedak	6	1	7
(Russia) Vesna Manasieva	3	6	5
(Slovakia) Kristína Kučová	3	6	3
20	(Portugal) Michelle Larcher de Brito	6	1	6

Second round
(Russia) Ekaterina Ivanova	6	7
(Portugal) Neuza Silva	2	5
(Ukraine) Yuliana Fedak	3	7^{7}	3
20	(Portugal) Michelle Larcher de Brito	6	6^{1}	6

Qualifying competition
(Russia) Ekaterina Ivanova	6	4	4
20	(Portugal) Michelle Larcher de Brito	0	6	6

=== Eighth qualifier ===
First round
8	(United Kingdom) Katie O'Brien	6	6^{5}	6
WC	(France) Karla Mraz	1	7^{7}	2
(Germany) Anne Schäfer	2	1
(Japan) Rika Fujiwara	6	6
(Hungary) Katalin Marosi	2	4
(Germany) Julia Schruff	6	6
(Netherlands) Arantxa Rus	6	6
19	(Slovenia) Andreja Klepač	4	4

Second round
8	(United Kingdom) Katie O'Brien	7^{7}	6
(Japan) Rika Fujiwara	6^{3}	2
(Germany) Julia Schruff	4	4
(Netherlands) Arantxa Rus	6	6

Qualifying competition
8	(United Kingdom) Katie O'Brien	4	6^{6}
(Netherlands) Arantxa Rus	6	7^{8}

=== Ninth qualifier ===
First round
9	(Russia) Anna Lapushchenkova	6	1	0
(Kazakhstan) Sesil Karatantcheva	4	6	6
(Belarus) Tatiana Poutchek	4	4
(Italy) Corinna Dentoni	6	6
PR	(Germany) Angelika Bachmann	7	6
(Argentina) Jorgelina Cravero	5	4
(France) Yulia Fedossova	6	7^{7}
24	(Chinese Taipei) Hsieh Su-wei	0	6^{5}

Second round
(Kazakhstan) Sesil Karatantcheva	6	3	2
(Italy) Corinna Dentoni	4	6	6
PR	(Germany) Angelika Bachmann	4	2
(France) Yulia Fedossova	6	6

Qualifying competition
(Italy) Corinna Dentoni	6	7
(France) Yulia Fedossova	2	5

=== Tenth qualifier ===
First round
10	(Germany) Tatjana Malek	6	6
(Russia) Elena Bovina	2	1
(United States) Madison Brengle	6^{4}	3
(Ukraine) Olga Savchuk	7^{7}	6
(Czech Republic) Renata Voráčová	2	4
(Germany) Angelique Kerber	6	6
WC	(France) Laura Thorpe	1	2
18	(Austria) Yvonne Meusburger	6	6

Second round
10	(Germany) Tatjana Malek	5	7	7
(Ukraine) Olga Savchuk	7	5	5
(Germany) Angelique Kerber	6	2	3
18	(Austria) Yvonne Meusburger	3	6	6

Qualifying competition
10	(Germany) Tatjana Malek	6^{7}	6	1
18	(Austria) Yvonne Meusburger	7^{9}	3	6

=== Eleventh qualifier ===
First round
11	(Italy) Alberta Brianti	7	6
(Russia) Ekaterina Bychkova	5	4
(Croatia) Petra Martić	7	7
(United Kingdom) Georgie Stoop	5	5
(Australia) Anastasia Rodionova	6^{4}	6	1
(Australia) Sophie Ferguson	7^{7}	4	6
(Germany) Angelika Rösch	0	3
21	(Russia) Evgeniya Rodina	6	6

Second round
11	(Italy) Alberta Brianti	5	2
(Croatia) Petra Martić	7	6
(Australia) Sophie Ferguson	4	1
21	(Russia) Evgeniya Rodina	6	6

Qualifying competition
(Croatia) Petra Martić	6	6
21	(Russia) Evgeniya Rodina	4	4

=== Twelfth qualifier ===
First round
12	(United States) Julie Ditty	5	2
(Slovakia) Lenka Wienerová	7	6
(Kyrgyzstan) Ksenia Palkina	3	6	1
(United States) Lauren Albanese	6	2	6
(Sweden) Sofia Arvidsson	4	2
(Russia) Alexandra Panova	6	6
WC	(France) Violette Huck	7^{7}	6^{6}	1
22	(United States) Carly Gullickson	6^{4}	7^{8}	6

Second round
(Slovakia) Lenka Wienerová	6	1	4
(United States) Lauren Albanese	3	6	6
(Russia) Alexandra Panova	0	1
22	(United States) Carly Gullickson	6	6

Qualifying competition
(United States) Lauren Albanese	4	3
22	(United States) Carly Gullickson	6	6
