= 2013 Open GDF Suez Nantes Atlantique – Singles =

Singles
- 2013 Open GDF Suez Nantes Atlantique

Final
- Champion: (Belarus) Aliaksandra Sasnovich
- Runner-up: (Poland) Magda Linette
- Score: 4–6, 6–4, 6–2

Events
Singles	Doubles
← 2012 ·	Open GDF Suez Nantes Atlantique	· 2014 →

Monica Niculescu was the defending champion, having won the event in 2012, but withdrew before the event started.

Aliaksandra Sasnovich won the tournament, defeating Magda Linette in the final, 4–6, 6–4, 6–2.

== Seeds ==
1. (Romania) ~~Monica Niculescu~~ (withdrew)
2. (Italy) ~~Camila Giorgi~~ (withdrew)
3. (Kazakhstan) Yulia Putintseva (first round)
4. (Spain) Lara Arruabarrena (quarterfinals)
5. (Ukraine) Nadiya Kichenok (semifinals)
6. (France) Claire Feuerstein (semifinals)
7. (Kazakhstan) Sesil Karatantcheva (first round)
8. (Sweden) Sofia Arvidsson (first round)
9. (France) Stéphanie Foretz Gacon (quarterfinals)
10. (Romania) Alexandra Dulgheru (first round)

== Main draw ==
=== Key ===
- Q = Qualifier
- WC = Wild card
- LL = Lucky loser
- Alt = Alternate
- SE = Special exempt
- PR = Protected ranking
- ITF = ITF entry
- JE = Junior exempt
- w/o = Walkover
- r = Retired
- d = Defaulted
- SR = Special ranking

=== Finals ===
Semifinals
5	(Ukraine) Nadiya Kichenok	3	1
(Belarus) Aliaksandra Sasnovich	6	6
(Poland) Magda Linette	6	6
6	(France) Claire Feuerstein	2	2

Final
(Belarus) Aliaksandra Sasnovich	4	6	6
(Poland) Magda Linette	6	4	2

=== Top half ===
First round
10	(Romania) A Dulgheru	3	5
LL	(Austria) Y Neuwirth	6	7
Q	(France) F Gervais	4	3
(France) A Hesse	6	6
(France) M Georges	0	4
(Brazil) PC Gonçalves	6	6
(Switzerland) V Golubic	2	6	2
5	(Ukraine) N Kichenok	6	1	6
4	(Spain) L Arruabarrena	6	6
LL	(Georgia (country)) M Chakhnashvili	3	1
LL	(Serbia) T Mirčić	3	6^{3}
WC	(Netherlands) M Krajicek	6	7^{7}
WC	(France) L Jeanjean	1	1
(Belarus) A Sasnovich	6	6
(Ukraine) L Kichenok	4	7	6
7	(Kazakhstan) S Karatantcheva	6	5	2

Second round
LL	(Austria) Y Neuwirth	6^{8}	2
(France) A Hesse	7^{10}	6
(Brazil) PC Gonçalves	6^{4}	1
5	(Ukraine) N Kichenok	7^{7}	6
4	(Spain) L Arruabarrena	6	4	6
WC	(Netherlands) M Krajicek	3	6	4
(Belarus) A Sasnovich	6	6
(Ukraine) L Kichenok	4	2

Quarterfinals
(France) A Hesse	4	2
5	(Ukraine) N Kichenok	6	6
4	(Spain) L Arruabarrena	1	1
(Belarus) A Sasnovich	6	6

Semifinals
5	(Ukraine) N Kichenok	3	1
(Belarus) A Sasnovich	6	6

=== Bottom half ===
First round
8	(Sweden) S Arvidsson	7	4	4
(Poland) M Linette	5	6	6
(Netherlands) R Hogenkamp	6	6
(Chile) D Seguel	3	2
Q	(United States) N Melichar	7	6
LL	(Germany) C Shakovets	5	4
WC	(France) K Laisné	6	6
3	(Kazakhstan) Y Putintseva	2	3
6	(France) C Feuerstein	6	6
(Russia) V Savinykh	1	2
Q	(France) F Ferro	6	6^{2}	6
Q	(Russia) N Orlova	1	7^{7}	1
(France) P Parmentier	4	4
(Czech Republic) L Hradecká	6	6
WC	(France) A Albié	3	2
9	(France) S Foretz Gacon	6	6

Second round
(Poland) M Linette	6	6
(Netherlands) R Hogenkamp	3	2
Q	(United States) N Melichar	6	2	2
WC	(France) K Laisné	2	6	6
6	(France) C Feuerstein	6	6
Q	(France) F Ferro	1	0
(Czech Republic) L Hradecká	6^{4}	7^{7}	1
9	(France) S Foretz Gacon	7^{7}	6^{3}	6

Quarterfinals
(Poland) M Linette	6	6
WC	(France) K Laisné	4	2
6	(France) C Feuerstein	6	6
9	(France) S Foretz Gacon	4	1

Semifinals
(Poland) M Linette	6	6
6	(France) C Feuerstein	2	2
