= 2013 Open GDF Suez Nantes Atlantique =

- Date: 28 October–3 November
- Edition: 11th
- Category: ITF Women's Circuit
- Prize money: $50,000+H
- Surface: Hard (indoor)
- Location: Nantes, France

Champions

Singles
- (Belarus) Aliaksandra Sasnovich

Doubles
- (Czech Republic) Lucie Hradecká / (Netherlands) Michaëlla Krajicek
← 2012 ·	Open GDF Suez Nantes Atlantique	· 2014 →

The 2013 Open GDF Suez Nantes Atlantique was a professional tennis tournament played on indoor hard courts. It was the eleventh edition of the tournament which was part of the 2013 ITF Women's Circuit, offering a total of $50,000+H in prize money. It took place in Nantes, France, on 28 October–3 November 2013.

== WTA entrants ==
=== Seeds ===
Country	Player	Rank^{1}	Seed
ROU	~~Monica Niculescu~~	~~54~~	~~1~~
ITA	~~Camila Giorgi~~	~~91~~	~~2~~
KAZ	Yulia Putintseva	94	3
ESP	Lara Arruabarrena	107	4
UKR	Nadiya Kichenok	110	5
FRA	Claire Feuerstein	123	6
KAZ	Sesil Karatantcheva	139	7
SWE	Sofia Arvidsson	146	8
FRA	Stéphanie Foretz Gacon	151	9
ROU	Alexandra Dulgheru	154	10

- ^{1} Rankings as of 21 October 2013

=== Other entrants ===
The following players received wildcards into the singles main draw:

- (France) Audrey Albié
- (France) Léolia Jeanjean
- (Netherlands) Michaëlla Krajicek
- (France) Kinnie Laisné

The following players received entry from the qualifying draw:

- (France) Fiona Ferro
- (France) Fiona Gervais
- (United States) Nicole Melichar
- (Russia) Natalia Orlova

The following players received entry into the singles main draw as lucky losers:

- (Georgia (country)) Margalita Chakhnashvili
- (Serbia) Teodora Mirčić
- (Austria) Yvonne Neuwirth
- (Germany) Christina Shakovets

== Champions ==
=== Singles ===
- (Belarus) Aliaksandra Sasnovich def. (Poland) Magda Linette 4–6, 6–4, 6–2

=== Doubles ===
- (Czech Republic) Lucie Hradecká / (Netherlands) Michaëlla Krajicek def. (France) Stéphanie Foretz Gacon / (Czech Republic) Eva Hrdinová 6–3, 6–2
