= 2014 Open GDF Suez Nantes Atlantique – Doubles =

Doubles
- 2014 Open GDF Suez Nantes Atlantique

Final
- Champions: (Ukraine) Lyudmyla Kichenok (Ukraine) Nadiia Kichenok
- Runners-up: (France) Stéphanie Foretz (France) Amandine Hesse
- Score: 6–2, 6–3

Events
Singles	Doubles
← 2013 ·	Open GDF Suez Nantes Atlantique	· 2015 →

Lucie Hradecká and Michaëlla Krajicek were the defending champions, however Krajicek chose not to participate. Hradecká partnered Andrea Hlaváčková but withdrew before their quarterfinal match.

The Ukrainian-twins Lyudmyla Kichenok and Nadiia Kichenok won the title, defeating the French-duo Stéphanie Foretz and Amandine Hesse in the final, 6–2, 6–3.

== Seeds ==
1. (Czech Republic) Andrea Hlaváčková / (Czech Republic) Lucie Hradecká (quarterfinals; withdrew)'
2. (Ukraine) Lyudmyla Kichenok / (Ukraine) Nadiia Kichenok (champions)
3. (Spain) Lara Arruabarrena / (Argentina) Tatiana Búa (first round)
4. (Poland) Katarzyna Piter / (Ukraine) Maryna Zanevska (quarterfinals)

== Draw ==
=== Key ===
- Q = Qualifier
- WC = Wild card
- LL = Lucky loser
- Alt = Alternate
- SE = Special exempt
- PR = Protected ranking
- ITF = ITF entry
- JE = Junior exempt
- w/o = Walkover
- r = Retired
- d = Defaulted
- SR = Special ranking

First round
1	(Czech Republic) A Hlaváčková (Czech Republic) L Hradecká	7	7^{7}
(Czech Republic) E Hrdinová (Czech Republic) T Smitková	5	6^{1}
(France) S Foretz (France) A Hesse	7^{7}	7^{11}
(Italy) G Barbieri (United Kingdom) J Konta	6^{4}	6^{9}
3	(Spain) L Arruabarrena (Argentina) T Búa	3	6^{5}
(Romania) E Bogdan (United States) N Melichar	6	7^{7}
(Belarus) L Marozava (Georgia (country)) S Shapatava	6	3	[10]
WC	(France) M Arcangioli (France) C Paquet	2	6	[6]
WC	(France) A Bacquié (France) M Noël	3	1
(Montenegro) D Kovinić (Romania) A Mitu	6	6
WC	(France) E Cascino (France) M Yerolymos	3	0
4	(Poland) K Piter (Ukraine) M Zanevska	6	6
(Uzbekistan) N Abduraimova (Uzbekistan) A Amanmuradova	6	6
(Austria) S Klemenschits (Belgium) A Van Uytvanck	2	3
(Netherlands) R Hogenkamp (Czech Republic) K Siniaková	3	2
2	(Ukraine) L Kichenok (Ukraine) N Kichenok	6	6

Quarterfinals
1	(Czech Republic) A Hlaváčková (Czech Republic) L Hradecká
(France) S Foretz (France) A Hesse	w/o
(Romania) E Bogdan (United States) N Melichar	6^{2}	6	[10]
(Belarus) L Marozava (Georgia (country)) S Shapatava	7^{7}	3	[6]
(Montenegro) D Kovinić (Romania) A Mitu	7^{7}	7
4	(Poland) K Piter (Ukraine) M Zanevska	6^{2}	5
(Uzbekistan) N Abduraimova (Uzbekistan) A Amanmuradova	7^{8}	1	[8]
2	(Ukraine) L Kichenok (Ukraine) N Kichenok	6^{6}	6	[10]

Semifinals
(France) S Foretz (France) A Hesse	7	6
(Romania) E Bogdan (United States) N Melichar	5	2
(Montenegro) D Kovinić (Romania) A Mitu	3	5
2	(Ukraine) L Kichenok (Ukraine) N Kichenok	6	7

Final
(France) S Foretz (France) A Hesse	2	3
2	(Ukraine) L Kichenok (Ukraine) N Kichenok	6	6
