= 2014 Open GDF Suez Nantes Atlantique =

- Date: 27 October–2 November
- Edition: 12th
- Category: ITF Women's Circuit
- Prize money: $50,000+H
- Surface: Hard / Indoor
- Location: Nantes, France

Champions

Singles
- (Czech Republic) Kateřina Siniaková

Doubles
- (Ukraine) Lyudmyla Kichenok / (Ukraine) Nadiia Kichenok
← 2013 ·	Open GDF Suez Nantes Atlantique	· 2015 →

The 2014 Open GDF Suez Nantes Atlantique is a professional tennis tournament played on indoor hard courts. It is the 12th edition of the tournament which is part of the 2014 ITF Women's Circuit, offering a total of $50,000+H in prize money. It takes place in Nantes, France between 27 October to 2 November 2014.

== Singles main-draw entrants ==
=== Seeds ===
Country	Player	Rank^{1}	Seed
SVK	Anna Schmiedlová	73	1
FRA	Pauline Parmentier	74	2
BEL	Alison Van Uytvanck	76	3
ESP	Lara Arruabarrena	82	4
CZE	Kateřina Siniaková	86	5
CZE	Tereza Smitková	92	6
BLR	Aliaksandra Sasnovich	95	7
UKR	Lesia Tsurenko	98	8

- ^{1} Rankings are as of October 20, 2014

=== Other entrants ===
The following players received wildcards into the singles main draw:

- (France) Fiona Ferro
- (France) Amandine Hesse
- (France) Virginie Razzano
- (France) Margot Yerolymos

The following players received entry from the qualifying draw:

- (France) Audrey Albié
- (Uzbekistan) Akgul Amanmuradova
- (France) Stéphanie Foretz
- (Ukraine) Lyudmyla Kichenok

The following player received entry from a lucky loser spot:

- (Ukraine) Nadiia Kichenok

== Champions ==
=== Singles ===
- (Czech Republic) Kateřina Siniaková def. (Tunisia) Ons Jabeur, 7–5, 6–2

=== Doubles ===
- (Ukraine) Lyudmyla Kichenok / (Ukraine) Nadiia Kichenok def. (France) Stéphanie Foretz / (France) Amandine Hesse, 6–2, 6–3
