= 2014 Open GDF Suez Nantes Atlantique – Singles =

Singles
- 2014 Open GDF Suez Nantes Atlantique

Final
- Champion: (Czech Republic) Kateřina Siniaková
- Runner-up: (Tunisia) Ons Jabeur
- Score: 7–5, 6–2

Events
Singles	Doubles
← 2013 ·	Open GDF Suez Nantes Atlantique	· 2015 →

Aliaksandra Sasnovich was the defending champion, but she lost in the first round to Andrea Hlaváčková.

Kateřina Siniaková won the title, defeating Ons Jabeur in the final, 7–5, 6–2.

== Seeds ==
1. (Slovakia) Anna Schmiedlová (semifinals)
2. (France) Pauline Parmentier (first round)
3. (Belgium) Alison Van Uytvanck (first round)
4. (Spain) Lara Arruabarrena (second round)
5. (Czech Republic) Kateřina Siniaková (champion)
6. (Czech Republic) Tereza Smitková (first round)
7. (Belarus) Aliaksandra Sasnovich (first round)
8. (Ukraine) Lesia Tsurenko (second round)

== Main draw ==
=== Key ===
- Q = Qualifier
- WC = Wild card
- LL = Lucky loser
- Alt = Alternate
- SE = Special exempt
- PR = Protected ranking
- ITF = ITF entry
- JE = Junior exempt
- w/o = Walkover
- r = Retired
- d = Defaulted
- SR = Special ranking

=== Finals ===
Semifinals
1	(Slovakia) Anna Schmiedlová	4	2
5	(Czech Republic) Kateřina Siniaková	6	6
(Tunisia) Ons Jabeur	6	6
(Croatia) Ana Konjuh	2	4

Final
5	(Czech Republic) Kateřina Siniaková	7	6
(Tunisia) Ons Jabeur	5	2

=== Top half ===
First round
1	(Slovakia) A Schmiedlová	6	6
(Ukraine) M Zanevska	3	2
(Czech Republic) L Hradecká	6	6
WC	(France) M Yerolymos	1	2
WC	(France) V Razzano	7	6
(Poland) K Piter	5	3
Q	(Ukraine) L Kichenok	5	6	3
8	(Ukraine) L Tsurenko	7	3	6
3	(Belgium) A Van Uytvanck	6^{2}	4
(Italy) G Barbieri	7^{7}	6
(Kazakhstan) Y Putintseva	6	7
(Uzbekistan) N Abduraimova	2	5
(Netherlands) R Hogenkamp	6	6
WC	(France) F Ferro	3	1
WC	(France) A Hesse	4	4
5	(Czech Republic) K Siniaková	6	6

Second round
1	(Slovakia) A Schmiedlová	6	6
(Czech Republic) L Hradecká	1	2
WC	(France) V Razzano	7	2	6
8	(Ukraine) L Tsurenko	5	6	4
(Italy) G Barbieri	7^{7}	1	6
(Kazakhstan) Y Putintseva	6^{2}	6	4
(Netherlands) R Hogenkamp	1	6	1
5	(Czech Republic) K Siniaková	6	4	6

Quarterfinals
1	(Slovakia) A Schmiedlová	7	0
WC	(France) V Razzano	5	0^{r}
(Italy) G Barbieri	2	4
5	(Czech Republic) K Siniaková	6	6

Semifinals
1	(Slovakia) A Schmiedlová	4	2
5	(Czech Republic) K Siniaková	6	6

=== Bottom half ===
First round
6	(Czech Republic) T Smitková	4	3
(Hungary) T Babos	6	6
(Serbia) V Dolonc	2	3
(Tunisia) O Jabeur	6	6
Q	(France) A Albié	0	2
LL	(Ukraine) N Kichenok	6	6
Q	(Uzbekistan) A Amanmuradova	6	1	3
4	(Spain) L Arruabarrena	1	6	6
7	(Belarus) A Sasnovich	6^{1}	1
(Czech Republic) A Hlaváčková	7^{7}	6
(Montenegro) D Kovinić	3	1
(Croatia) A Konjuh	6	6
Q	(France) S Foretz	0	6^{5}
(Romania) A Mitu	6	7^{7}
(United Kingdom) J Konta	6	6
2	(France) P Parmentier	3	4

Second round
(Hungary) T Babos	2^{r}
(Tunisia) O Jabeur	4
LL	(Ukraine) N Kichenok	3	6	6
4	(Spain) L Arruabarrena	6	3	3
(Czech Republic) A Hlaváčková	4	1
(Croatia) A Konjuh	6	6
(Romania) A Mitu	3	6	6
(United Kingdom) J Konta	6	3	3

Quarterfinals
(Tunisia) O Jabeur	6	6
LL	(Ukraine) N Kichenok	1	3
(Croatia) A Konjuh	6	7
(Romania) A Mitu	4	5

Semifinals
(Tunisia) O Jabeur	6	6
(Croatia) A Konjuh	2	4
