= 2009 French Open – Women's doubles =

Women's doubles
- 2009 French Open

Final
- Champion: (Spain) Anabel Medina Garrigues (Spain) Virginia Ruano Pascual
- Runner-up: (Belarus) Victoria Azarenka (Russia) Elena Vesnina
- Score: 6–1, 6–1

Details
- Draw: 64 (7 WC )
- Seeds: 16

Events
Singles	men	women		boys	girls
Doubles	men	women	mixed	boys	girls
WC Singles	men	women	quad
WC Doubles	men	women	quad
Legends	−45	45+	women
← 2008 ·	French Open	· 2010 →

Anabel Medina Garrigues and Virginia Ruano Pascual were the defending champions, and successfully defended their title, defeating Victoria Azarenka and Elena Vesnina in the final 6–1, 6–1.

== Seeds ==
1. (Zimbabwe) Cara Black / (United States) Liezel Huber (semifinals)
2. (Czech Republic) Květa Peschke / (United States) Lisa Raymond (third round)
3. (Spain) Anabel Medina Garrigues / (Spain) Virginia Ruano Pascual (champions)
4. (Australia) Samantha Stosur / (Australia) Rennae Stubbs (third round)
5. (United States) Serena Williams / (United States) Venus Williams (third round)
6. (Spain) Nuria Llagostera Vives / (Spain) María José Martínez Sánchez (first round)
7. (Slovakia) Daniela Hantuchová / (Japan) Ai Sugiyama (third round)
8. (Russia) Maria Kirilenko / (Italy) Flavia Pennetta (third round)
9. (Chinese Taipei) Hsieh Su-wei / (China) Peng Shuai (semifinals)
10. (United States) Bethanie Mattek-Sands / (Russia) Nadia Petrova (quarterfinals)
11. (Germany) Anna-Lena Grönefeld / (Switzerland) Patty Schnyder (quarterfinals)
12. (Belarus) Victoria Azarenka / (Russia) Elena Vesnina (final)
13. (United States) Vania King / (Romania) Monica Niculescu (third round)
14. (Chinese Taipei) Chuang Chia-jung / (India) Sania Mirza (second round)
15. (France) Nathalie Dechy / (Italy) Mara Santangelo (first round)
16. (China) Yan Zi / (China) Zheng Jie (quarterfinals)

== Draw ==
=== Finals ===
Quarterfinals
1	(Zimbabwe) Cara Black (United States) Liezel Huber	6	6
10	(United States) Bethanie Mattek-Sands (Russia) Nadia Petrova	3	3
3	(Spain) Anabel Medina Garrigues (Spain) Virginia Ruano Pascual	7	6
11	(Germany) Anna-Lena Grönefeld (Switzerland) Patty Schnyder	6^{2}	2
12	(Belarus) Victoria Azarenka (Russia) Elena Vesnina	6	4	6
16	(China) Yan Zi (China) Zheng Jie	4	6	2
9	(Chinese Taipei) Hsieh Su-wei (China) Peng Shuai	2	6	7
(Poland) Agnieszka Radwańska (Poland) Urszula Radwańska	6	4	5

Semifinals
1	(Zimbabwe) Cara Black (United States) Liezel Huber	5	7	2
3	(Spain) Anabel Medina Garrigues (Spain) Virginia Ruano Pascual	7	5	6
12	(Belarus) Victoria Azarenka (Russia) Elena Vesnina	6	7
9	(Chinese Taipei) Hsieh Su-wei (China) Peng Shuai	3	5

Final
3	(Spain) Anabel Medina Garrigues (Spain) Virginia Ruano Pascual	6	6
12	(Belarus) Victoria Azarenka (Russia) Elena Vesnina	1	1

=== Top half ===
==== Section 1 ====
First round
1	(Zimbabwe) C Black (United States) L Huber	6	7
(Hungary) M Czink (South Africa) N Grandin	3	6^{2}
(Australia) J Dokić (Russia) A Kleybanova	6	6
(Czech Republic) P Cetkovská (Spain) C Suárez Navarro	3	2
WC	(France) K Laisne (France) S Vongsouthi	1	1
(Estonia) M Ani (Estonia) K Kanepi	6	6
(United States) R Kops Jones (United States) A Spears	1	3
13	(United States) V King (Romania) M Niculescu	6	6
10	(United States) B Mattek-Sands (Russia) N Petrova	7	6
(Japan) A Morita (Slovakia) M Rybáriková	5	3
WC	(France) S Lefèvre (France) A Védy	6	2	1
(Ukraine) A Bondarenko (Ukraine) K Bondarenko	3	6	6
(Italy) ME Camerin (Russia) A Chakvetadze	3	4
(Argentina) G Dulko (Hungary) Á Szávay	6	6
(Czech Republic) A Hlaváčková (Czech Republic) L Hradecká	1	6	3
5	(United States) S Williams (United States) V Williams	6	3	6

Second round
1	(Zimbabwe) C Black (United States) L Huber	w/o
(Australia) J Dokić (Russia) A Kleybanova
(Estonia) M Ani (Estonia) K Kanepi	0	2
13	(United States) V King (Romania) M Niculescu	6	6
10	(United States) B Mattek-Sands (Russia) N Petrova	6	6
(Ukraine) A Bondarenko (Ukraine) K Bondarenko	1	3
(Argentina) G Dulko (Hungary) Á Szávay	6	1	2
5	(United States) S Williams (United States) V Williams	2	6	6

Third round
1	(Zimbabwe) C Black (United States) L Huber	7	6
13	(United States) V King (Romania) M Niculescu	5	1
10	(United States) B Mattek-Sands (Russia) N Petrova	7	5	7
5	(United States) S Williams (United States) V Williams	6^{4}	7	6^{6}

Quarterfinals
1	(Zimbabwe) C Black (United States) L Huber	6	6
10	(United States) B Mattek-Sands (Russia) N Petrova	3	3

==== Section 2 ====
First round
3	(Spain) A Medina Garrigues (Spain) V Ruano Pascual	6	6
WC	(Slovakia) D Cibulková (France) V Razzano	2	4
(Belarus) E Dzehalevich (Slovenia) A Klepač	7	3	6
(Czech Republic) E Hrdinová (Czech Republic) N Vaidišová	5	6	2
WC	(France) S Foretz (France) C Pin	6	1	3
(Czech Republic) L Šafářová (Czech Republic) V Uhlířová	3	6	6
(Russia) V Dushevina (Australia) A Rodionova	6	6
15	(France) N Dechy (Italy) M Santangelo	1	1
11	(Germany) A-L Grönefeld (Switzerland) P Schnyder	6	6
(Germany) K Barrois (United Kingdom) A Keothavong	1	2
(France) M Johansson (France) P Parmentier	6	6
WC	(France) V Huck (France) L Thorpe	2	3
(Kazakhstan) Y Shvedova (Thailand) T Tanasugarn	2	2
(United States) J Craybas (United States) C Gullickson	6	6
(Romania) S Cîrstea (Denmark) C Wozniacki	4	4
8	(Russia) M Kirilenko (Italy) F Pennetta	6	6

Second round
3	(Spain) A Medina Garrigues (Spain) V Ruano Pascual	6	6
(Belarus) E Dzehalevich (Slovenia) A Klepač	2	4
(Czech Republic) L Šafářová (Czech Republic) V Uhlířová	2	1
(Russia) V Dushevina (Australia) A Rodionova	6	6
11	(Germany) A-L Grönefeld (Switzerland) P Schnyder	6	6
(France) M Johansson (France) P Parmentier	3	0
(United States) J Craybas (United States) C Gullickson	1	1
8	(Russia) M Kirilenko (Italy) F Pennetta	6	6

Third round
3	(Spain) A Medina Garrigues (Spain) V Ruano Pascual	2	6	6
(Russia) V Dushevina (Australia) A Rodionova	6	3	4
11	(Germany) A-L Grönefeld (Switzerland) P Schnyder	7	6
8	(Russia) M Kirilenko (Italy) F Pennetta	6^{4}	4

Quarterfinals
3	(Spain) A Medina Garrigues (Spain) V Ruano Pascual	7	6
11	(Germany) A-L Grönefeld (Switzerland) P Schnyder	6^{2}	2

=== Bottom half ===
==== Section 3 ====
First round
6	(Spain) N Llagostera Vives (Spain) MJ Martínez Sánchez	6^{3}	4
(Russia) A Pavlyuchenkova (Italy) F Schiavone	7	6
(Czech Republic) I Benešová (Czech Republic) B Záhlavová-Strýcová	6	6
(Austria) S Bammer (Slovakia) J Husárová	1	1
Alt	(United Kingdom) S Borwell (Russia) M Kondratieva	2	3
(France) S Brémond Beltrame (France) J Coin	6	6
(France) S Cohen-Aloro (France) A Cornet	1	3
12	(Belarus) V Azarenka (Russia) E Vesnina	6	6
16	(China) Z Yan (China) J Zheng	6	6
(Romania) E Gallovits (Belarus) O Govortsova	4	2
(Bosnia and Herzegovina) M Jugić-Salkić (Belarus) T Poutchek	4	3
(Poland) K Jans (Poland) A Rosolska	6	6
(Uzbekistan) A Amanmuradova (Russia) A Kudryavtseva	3	2
(Spain) L Domínguez Lino (Italy) S Errani	6	6
(Bulgaria) T Pironkova (Tunisia) S Sfar	2	2
4	(Australia) S Stosur (Australia) R Stubbs	6	6

Second round
(Russia) A Pavlyuchenkova (Italy) F Schiavone	6	6
(Czech Republic) I Benešová (Czech Republic) B Záhlavová-Strýcová	3	3
(France) S Brémond Beltrame (France) J Coin	2	0
12	(Belarus) V Azarenka (Russia) E Vesnina	6	6
16	(China) Z Yan (China) J Zheng	6	6
(Poland) K Jans (Poland) A Rosolska	2	4
(Spain) L Domínguez Lino (Italy) S Errani	3	4
4	(Australia) S Stosur (Australia) R Stubbs	6	6

Third round
(Russia) A Pavlyuchenkova (Italy) F Schiavone	2	5
12	(Belarus) V Azarenka (Russia) E Vesnina	6	7
16	(China) Z Yan (China) J Zheng	6	7
4	(Australia) S Stosur (Australia) R Stubbs	4	5

Quarterfinals
12	(Belarus) V Azarenka (Russia) E Vesnina	6	4	6
16	(China) Z Yan (China) J Zheng	4	6	2

==== Section 4 ====
First round
7	(Slovakia) D Hantuchová (Japan) A Sugiyama	7	7
WC	(France) É Loit (France) K Mladenovic	5	5
(Russia) E Makarova (Spain) A Parra Santonja	6	7
(Ukraine) M Koryttseva (Kazakhstan) G Voskoboeva	0	6^{0}
(Australia) J Groth (Czech Republic) R Voráčová	2	3
(Ukraine) O Savchuk (China) T Sun	6	6
(Latvia) L Dekmeijere (Canada) A Wozniak	3	1
9	(Chinese Taipei) S-w Hsieh (China) S Peng	6	6
14	(Chinese Taipei) C-j Chuang (India) S Mirza	7	6
(Turkey) İ Şenoğlu (Belgium) Y Wickmayer	5	1
WC	(Ukraine) V Kutuzova (France) A Rezaï	2	1
(Poland) A Radwańska (Poland) U Radwańska	6	6
(United States) J Ditty (Argentina) ME Salerni	6^{3}	7	6
(Poland) M Domachowska (Austria) T Paszek	7	5	2
(Italy) T Garbin (Italy) R Vinci	2	4
2	(Czech Republic) K Peschke (United States) L Raymond	6	6

Second round
7	(Slovakia) D Hantuchová (Japan) A Sugiyama	6	6
(Russia) E Makarova (Spain) A Parra Santonja	2	2
(Ukraine) O Savchuk (China) T Sun	3	0
9	(Chinese Taipei) S-w Hsieh (China) S Peng	6	6
14	(Chinese Taipei) C-j Chuang (India) S Mirza	6	6^{5}	3
(Poland) A Radwańska (Poland) U Radwańska	4	7	6
(United States) J Ditty (Argentina) ME Salerni	1	1
2	(Czech Republic) K Peschke (United States) L Raymond	6	6

Third round
7	(Slovakia) D Hantuchová (Japan) A Sugiyama	3	5
9	(Chinese Taipei) S-w Hsieh (China) S Peng	6	7
(Poland) A Radwańska (Poland) U Radwańska	6	6
2	(Czech Republic) K Peschke (United States) L Raymond	2	3

Quarterfinals
9	(Chinese Taipei) S-w Hsieh (China) S Peng	2	6	7
(Poland) A Radwańska (Poland) U Radwańska	6	4	5
