= 2009 French Open =

- Date: 24 May – 7 June 2009
- Edition: 108
- Category: 79th Grand Slam (ITF)
- Surface: Clay
- Location: Paris (XVI^{e}), France
- Venue: Stade Roland Garros

Champions

Men's singles
- (Switzerland) Roger Federer

Women's singles
- (Russia) Svetlana Kuznetsova

Men's doubles
- (Czech Republic) Lukáš Dlouhý / (India) Leander Paes

Women's doubles
- (Spain) Anabel Medina Garrigues / (Spain) Virginia Ruano Pascual

Mixed doubles
- (United States) Liezel Huber / (United States) Bob Bryan

Wheelchair men's singles
- (Japan) Shingo Kunieda

Wheelchair women's singles
- (Netherlands) Esther Vergeer

Wheelchair men's doubles
- (France) Stéphane Houdet / (France) Michaël Jérémiasz

Wheelchair women's doubles
- (Netherlands) Korie Homan / (Netherlands) Esther Vergeer

Boys' singles
- (Sweden) Daniel Berta

Girls' singles
- (France) Kristina Mladenovic

Boys' doubles
- (Croatia) Marin Draganja / (Croatia) Dino Marcan

Girls' doubles
- (Romania) Elena Bogdan / (Thailand) Noppawan Lertcheewakarn

Legends under 45 doubles
- (France) Cédric Pioline / (Netherlands) Paul Haarhuis

Legends over 45 doubles
- (Sweden) Anders Järryd / (United States) John McEnroe
| ← 2008 · | French Open | · 2010 → |

The 2009 French Open was a tennis tournament played on outdoor clay courts. It was the 108th edition of the French Open, and the second Grand Slam event of the year. It took place at the Stade Roland Garros in Paris, France, from May 24 through June 7, 2009.

Rafael Nadal and Ana Ivanovic were the defending champions. Both failed to defend their titles, losing to Robin Söderling and Victoria Azarenka in the fourth round, respectively. Nadal's loss to Söderling was his first defeat in the tournament since debuting in 2005, and would remain his sole loss at the tournament until the 2015 French Open. Söderling proceeded to defeat Nikolay Davydenko and Fernando González on his way to the final, where he was defeated by Roger Federer. By winning the French Open, Federer equalled Pete Sampras' then-record of 14 Grand Slam titles, and completed his Career Grand Slam by winning the tournament; he had lost the previous three finals to Nadal. Svetlana Kuznetsova, the runner-up to Justine Henin-Hardenne in 2006, was the women's champion this year. She defeated World No. 1 Dinara Safina in the final, avenging a semi-final loss to the same opponent in 2008.

== Notable stories ==
=== Rafael Nadal record winning streak, and loss to Robin Söderling ===
Entering the tournament, four-time champion Rafael Nadal was unbeaten in French Open singles matches, having won every match and tournament since his debut in 2005. His victory against Russian Teymuraz Gabashvili in the second round on May 27 was his 30th consecutive win, breaking the record for the longest French Open winning streak by a man or woman, held by Chris Evert, who won 29 consecutive matches. Nadal extended the record to 31 consecutive matches by beating Lleyton Hewitt on May 29.

In his fourth round match on May 31, Nadal was defeated by World No. 23 Robin Söderling in four sets, 2–6, 7–6, 4–6, 6–7. The upset result ended Nadal's French Open winning streak at 31 matches. Söderling had never previously reached the fourth round of any Grand Slam tournament, and had never previously beaten Nadal in three attempts, although he had taken him to five sets at Wimbledon in 2007. Söderling proceeded to reach the final, defeating Nikolay Davydenko in straight sets and Fernando González in five sets before losing to Roger Federer in his first Grand Slam final appearance.

Of the upset result, former three-time French Open champion Mats Wilander stated that "Everybody's in a state of shock, I would think. At some point, Nadal was going to lose. But nobody expected it to happen today, and maybe not this year. Now it's a matter of: There's a tournament to be won." Nadal would begin another streak the next year, and did not lose another match at the tournament until the 2015 French Open, when he lost to Novak Djokovic.

=== Maria Sharapova's comeback ===
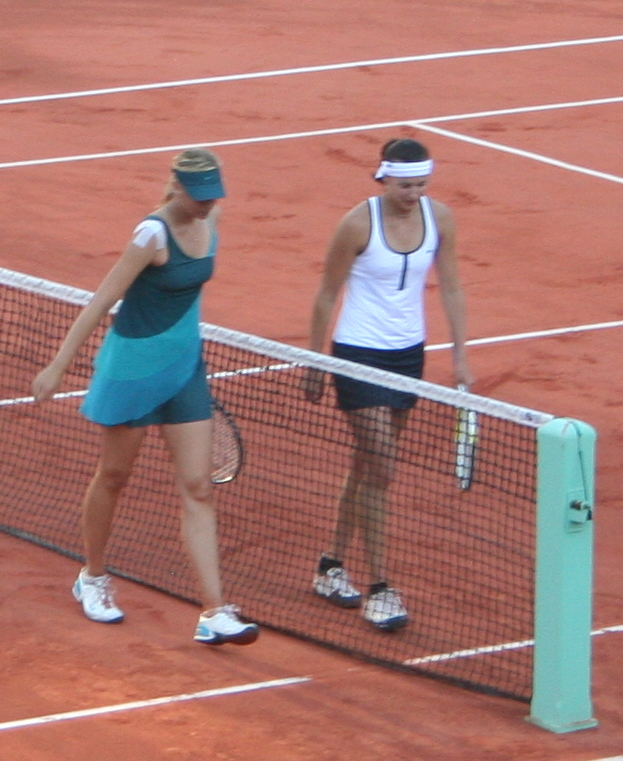
Maria Sharapova after her third round win against Yaroslava Shvedova.

After nearly a year out of the sport due to a serious shoulder injury which forced her to miss the 2008 Beijing Olympics, the 2008 US Open and her Australian Open title defence, Maria Sharapova, who started at World No. 53 by the time the entry list was released, then plummeted to as low as World No. 126 during her time away from the sport, entered the tournament ranked World No. 102 at the start of the tournament, and surprised many by reaching the quarter-finals, where she was defeated 6–0, 6–2 by Dominika Cibulková (Sharapova had to defend a match point at 0–6, 0–5 down). Sharapova, unseeded at a Grand Slam for the first time since 2003, had won all of her first four matches in three sets.

=== Federer's Career Grand Slam ===
Roger Federer won the finals, against Robin Söderling to finally win the French Open tournament for the first time in his career, after he was beaten in three previous finals by Nadal. With this win, he completed his career Grand Slam, titles in all four Grand Slam tournaments in his career. He became the third male player in the Open era (after Rod Laver and Andre Agassi) and sixth male player in tennis history overall to accomplish the feat.

== Singles players ==
Men's singles

| Champion | | Runner-up | |
|---|---|---|---|
| (Switzerland) Roger Federer [2] | | (Sweden) Robin Söderling [23] | |
Semifinals out
| (Chile) Fernando González [12] | | (Argentina) Juan Martín del Potro [5] | |
Quarterfinals out
| (Russia) Nikolay Davydenko [10] | (United Kingdom) Andy Murray [3] | (Spain) Tommy Robredo [16] | (France) Gaël Monfils [11] |
4th round out
| (Spain) Rafael Nadal [1] | (Spain) Fernando Verdasco [8] | (Croatia) Marin Čilić [13] | (Romania) Victor Hănescu [30] |
| (France) Jo-Wilfried Tsonga [9] | (Germany) Philipp Kohlschreiber [29] | (United States) Andy Roddick [6] | (Germany) Tommy Haas |
3rd round out
| (Australia) Lleyton Hewitt | (Spain) David Ferrer [14] | (Switzerland) Stanislas Wawrinka [17] | (Spain) Nicolás Almagro [31] |
| (Serbia) Janko Tipsarević | (Czech Republic) Radek Štěpánek [18] | (France) Josselin Ouanna (WC) | (France) Gilles Simon [7] |
| (Russia) Igor Andreev [25] | (Belgium) Christophe Rochus | (Argentina) Máximo González | (Serbia) Novak Djokovic [4] |
| (France) Marc Gicquel | (Austria) Jürgen Melzer [24] | (France) Jérémy Chardy | (France) Paul-Henri Mathieu |
2nd round out
| (Russia) Teymuraz Gabashvili | (Kazakhstan) Andrey Golubev | (Uzbekistan) Denis Istomin | (Germany) Nicolas Kiefer |
| (Argentina) Diego Junqueira | (Chile) Nicolás Massú | (Latvia) Ernests Gulbis | (Germany) Philipp Petzschner |
| (Italy) Potito Starace | (Spain) Feliciano López [28] | (France) Mathieu Montcourt (LL) | (Israel) Dudi Sela |
| (Portugal) Rui Machado (Q) | (Russia) Marat Safin [20] | (Russia) Mikhail Youzhny | (United States) Robert Kendrick |
| (Serbia) Viktor Troicki | (Argentina) Martín Vassallo Argüello | (France) Arnaud Clément | (Argentina) Juan Mónaco |
| (Spain) Daniel Gimeno Traver | (Italy) Andreas Seppi | (Spain) Juan Carlos Ferrero | (Ukraine) Sergiy Stakhovsky (Q) |
| (Czech Republic) Ivo Minář | (Germany) Andreas Beck | (France) Guillaume Rufin (WC) | (Romania) Victor Crivoi (Q) |
| (Argentina) Leonardo Mayer (Q) | (Italy) Simone Bolelli | (Spain) Pablo Andújar | (Argentina) José Acasuso |
1st round out
| (Brazil) Marcos Daniel (Q) | (Russia) Igor Kunitsyn | (Germany) Denis Gremelmayr | (Croatia) Ivo Karlović [26] |
| (United States) Kevin Kim | (Colombia) Santiago Giraldo | (Serbia) Ilija Bozoljac | (Portugal) Frederico Gil |
| (Austria) Stefan Koubek (PR) | (Chile) Paul Capdeville | (Austria) Daniel Köllerer | (France) Nicolas Devilder |
| (Argentina) Agustín Calleri | (United States) Sam Querrey | (Canada) Peter Polansky (Q) | (France) Florent Serra |
| (Argentina) Juan Ignacio Chela | (Germany) Mischa Zverev | (Spain) Albert Montañés | (Brazil) Franco Ferreiro (Q) |
| (Argentina) Gastón Gaudio (WC) | (Chinese Taipei) Lu Yen-hsun | (Monaco) Jean-René Lisnard (Q) | (Czech Republic) Jan Hernych |
| (Czech Republic) Jiří Vaněk (Q) | (Belgium) Kristof Vliegen | (Spain) Marcel Granollers | (France) Alexandre Sidorenko (WC) |
| (Belgium) Steve Darcis | (Luxembourg) Gilles Müller | (Germany) Daniel Brands (Q) | (United States) Wayne Odesnik |
| (France) Michaël Llodra | (Poland) Łukasz Kubot (Q) | (Brazil) Thomaz Bellucci | (Italy) Fabio Fognini (Q) |
| (Russia) Dmitry Tursunov [21] | (France) Fabrice Santoro | (Cyprus) Marcos Baghdatis | (France) Julien Benneteau |
| (France) Adrian Mannarino (WC) | (Russia) Evgeny Korolev | (Spain) Guillermo García López | (United States) Mardy Fish [22] |
| (Australia) Bernard Tomic (WC) | (Croatia) Ivan Ljubičić | (Argentina) Brian Dabul | (Ecuador) Nicolás Lapentti |
| (France) Romain Jouan (WC) | (Spain) Óscar Hernández | (Spain) Iván Navarro | (Germany) Rainer Schüttler [27] |
| (Argentina) Sergio Roitman | (Argentina) Eduardo Schwank | (Germany) Simon Greul (Q) | (United States) Bobby Reynolds |
| (United States) James Blake [15] | (Romania) Andrei Pavel (PR) | (Brazil) Thiago Alves (LL) | (Czech Republic) Tomáš Berdych [19] |
| (France) Laurent Recouderc (WC) | (United States) Robby Ginepri | (Spain) Santiago Ventura (Q) | (Spain) Alberto Martín |

Women's singles

| Champion | | Runner-up | |
|---|---|---|---|
| (Russia) Svetlana Kuznetsova [7] | | (Russia) Dinara Safina [1] | |
Semifinals out
| (Slovakia) Dominika Cibulková [20] | | (Australia) Samantha Stosur [30] | |
Quarterfinals out
| (Belarus) Victoria Azarenka [9] | (Russia) Maria Sharapova | (Romania) Sorana Cîrstea | (United States) Serena Williams [2] |
4th round out
| (France) Aravane Rezaï | (Serbia) Ana Ivanovic [8] | (Hungary) Ágnes Szávay [29] | (China) Li Na [25] |
| (Serbia) Jelena Janković [5] | (France) Virginie Razzano | (Poland) Agnieszka Radwańska [12] | (Canada) Aleksandra Wozniak [24] |
3rd round out
| (Russia) Anastasia Pavlyuchenkova | (Portugal) Michelle Larcher de Brito (Q) | (Spain) Carla Suárez Navarro [22] | (Czech Republic) Iveta Benešová [32] |
| (United States) Venus Williams [3] | (Argentina) Gisela Dulko | (Kazakhstan) Yaroslava Shvedova (Q) | (Belarus) Olga Govortsova |
| (Australia) Jarmila Groth | (Denmark) Caroline Wozniacki [10] | (Italy) Tathiana Garbin | (Russia) Elena Dementieva [4] |
| (Hungary) Melinda Czink | (Ukraine) Kateryna Bondarenko | (Spain) Lourdes Domínguez Lino | (Spain) María José Martínez Sánchez |
2nd round out
| (Russia) Vitalia Diatchenko | (France) Julie Coin | (Slovenia) Polona Hercog (Q) | (China) Zheng Jie [15] |
| (Germany) Kristina Barrois | (Czech Republic) Lucie Hradecká | (Russia) Alla Kudryavtseva | (Thailand) Tamarine Tanasugarn |
| (Czech Republic) Lucie Šafářová | (Russia) Elena Vesnina | (Belgium) Kirsten Flipkens | (Germany) Anna-Lena Grönefeld |
| (Russia) Nadia Petrova [11] | (Netherlands) Arantxa Rus (Q) | (Switzerland) Timea Bacsinszky | (Uzbekistan) Akgul Amanmuradova |
| (Slovakia) Magdaléna Rybáriková | (Colombia) Mariana Duque Mariño (LL) | (France) Alizé Cornet [21] | (United States) Jill Craybas |
| (France) Marion Bartoli [13] | (Spain) Anabel Medina Garrigues | (Belgium) Yanina Wickmayer | (Australia) Jelena Dokic |
| (Kazakhstan) Galina Voskoboeva | (Austria) Sybille Bammer [28] | (Australia) Olivia Rogowska (WC) | (Ukraine) Mariya Koryttseva |
| (United States) Alexa Glatch | (Croatia) Petra Martić (Q) | (Ukraine) Viktoriya Kutuzova | (Spain) Virginia Ruano Pascual |
1st round out
| (United Kingdom) Anne Keothavong | (France) Mathilde Johansson | (Spain) Nuria Llagostera Vives | (Romania) Raluca Olaru |
| (Russia) Alisa Kleybanova [23] | (Japan) Ai Sugiyama | (United Kingdom) Melanie South | (France) Stéphanie Cohen-Aloro |
| (Italy) Roberta Vinci | (Argentina) María Emilia Salerni (PR) | (Austria) Yvonne Meusburger | (Romania) Edina Gallovits |
| (Germany) Julia Görges | (United States) Varvara Lepchenko | (France) Camille Pin | (Italy) Sara Errani |
| (United States) Bethanie Mattek-Sands | (Germany) Sabine Lisicki | (France) Séverine Brémond Beltrame | (Italy) Corinna Dentoni (Q) |
| (Ukraine) Alona Bondarenko | (France) Stéphanie Foretz | (Austria) Tamira Paszek | (France) Amélie Mauresmo |
| (United States) Lauren Embree (WC) | (Belarus) Anastasiya Yakimova | (France) Olivia Sanchez (WC) | (Estonia) Kaia Kanepi [19] |
| (Poland) Marta Domachowska | (France) Émilie Loit (WC) | (France) Irena Pavlovic (WC) | (United Kingdom) Katie O'Brien (LL) |
| (Czech Republic) Petra Cetkovská | (France) Kristina Mladenovic (WC) | (France) Kinnie Laisné (WC) | (Russia) Anna Chakvetadze [26] |
| (Estonia) Maret Ani | (United States) Carly Gullickson (Q) | (Bulgaria) Tsvetana Pironkova | (Russia) Vera Dushevina |
| (France) Pauline Parmentier | (Japan) Ayumi Morita | (Slovakia) Daniela Hantuchová | (Russia) Ekaterina Makarova |
| (Italy) Francesca Schiavone | (Poland) Urszula Radwańska | (Croatia) Karolina Šprem | (South Africa) Chanelle Scheepers (Q) |
| (France) Claire Feuerstein (WC) | (India) Sania Mirza | (Latvia) Anastasija Sevastova (Q) | (France) Nathalie Dechy |
| (Switzerland) Patty Schnyder [17] | (Russia) Maria Kirilenko | (Austria) Patricia Mayr | (Paraguay) Rossana de los Ríos |
| (Italy) Flavia Pennetta [14] | (Czech Republic) Barbora Záhlavová-Strýcová | (Italy) Mara Santangelo | (Romania) Monica Niculescu |
| (China) Peng Shuai [31] | (Czech Republic) Zuzana Ondrášková (Q) | (Czech Republic) Nicole Vaidišová | (Czech Republic) Klára Zakopalová |

== Day-by-day summaries ==
=== Day 1 (May 24) ===
Andrey Golubev of Kazakhstan became the first male winner at this year's French Open. French favourites Julie Coin and Mathieu Montcourt enjoyed safe passages through to the second round, but compatriot Mathilde Johansson was unable to use the crowd's advantage, falling to Vitalia Diatchenko 2–6, 6–2, 10–8. Lleyton Hewitt came from 2 tiebreak sets down, taking a third set tiebreak and eventually the match over the 26th seeded Croat Ivo Karlović, winning 6–7(1), 6–7(4), 7–6(4), 6–4, 6–3, to cause the first upset of a seed in the tournament. Karlovic set the new record for the greatest number of aces in the match, serving 55, but couldn't find a way to win. French wildcard Josselin Ouanna came from two sets to one behind to defeat Marcel Granollers, 7–5, 2–6, 3–6, 7–6(2), 6–1. However, Amélie Mauresmo lost to Anna-Lena Grönefeld 6–4, 6–3, to add to her history of early-round exits at Roland Garros. However, seventh seed Gilles Simon recovered from a tight clash with Wayne Odesnik, 4–6, 7–5, 6–2, 4–6, 6–3. Former French Open champion Gastón Gaudio made a disappointing start to his grand slam comeback, losing in straight sets to Radek Štěpánek 6–3, 6–4, 6–1.

- Seeds out:
  - Men's Singles: (Croatia) Ivo Karlović
  - Women's Singles: (France) Amélie Mauresmo, (Estonia) Kaia Kanepi
- Schedule of Play

Matches on main courts
Matches on Court Philippe Chatrier (Center Court)
| Event | Winner | Loser | Score |
|---|---|---|---|
| Women's singles 1st round | (Serbia) Ana Ivanovic (8) | (Italy) Sara Errani | 7–6(3), 6–3 |
| Men's singles 1st round | (Russia) Marat Safin (20) | (France) Alexandre Sidorenko (WC) | 6–4, 6–4, 6–4 |
| Men's singles 1st round | (France) Gilles Simon (7) | (United States) Wayne Odesnik | 3–6, 7–5, 6–2, 4–6, 6–3 |
| Women's singles 1st round | (Germany) Anna-Lena Grönefeld | (France) Amélie Mauresmo (16) | 6–4, 6–3 |
Matches on Court Suzanne Lenglen (Grandstand)
| Event | Winner | Loser | Score |
| Women's singles 1st round | (Russia) Vitalia Diatchenko (Q) | (France) Mathilde Johansson | 2–6, 6–2, 10–8 |
| Men's singles 1st round | (Spain) Fernando Verdasco (8) | (France) Florent Serra | 6–2, 6–1, 6–4 |
| Women's singles 1st round | (Russia) Nadia Petrova (11) | (United States) Lauren Embree (WC) | 6–1, 6–2 |
| Men's singles 1st round | (United Kingdom) Andy Murray (3) | (Argentina) Juan Ignacio Chela | 6–2, 6–2, 6–1 |

=== Day 2 (May 25) ===
World number one and top seed Dinara Safina thrashed British Number one Anne Keothavong, 6–0, 6–0 in the first match on Philippe Chatrier, followed by ATP World Tour Champion and four-time defending champion, top seed Rafael Nadal defeating Brazilian qualifier Marcos Daniel 7–5, 6–4, 6–3. Second seed Roger Federer followed with a comfortable victory over Alberto Martín 6–4, 6–3, 6–2. Third seed Venus Williams struggled against Bethanie Mattek-Sands, but won 6–1, 4–6, 6–2. French wildcard Guillaume Rufin, who turned 19 on day 3, upset Eduardo Schwank, who reached the second week last year, 6–1, 6–3, 6–3 to the delight of French fans. However, fans were disappointed to see their Nicolas Devilder fall in five sets (despite holding a two sets to love lead) to seventeenth seed Stanislas Wawrinka, 6–3, 5–7, 2–6, 6–4, 6–4. More disappointment came when Romain Jouan, another wildcard, fell 6–2, 6–4, 6–2 to sixth seed Andy Roddick. However, more good news for American fans followed when Fed Cup heroine Alexa Glatch stunned Flavia Pennetta 6–1, 6–1, to advance to the second round. Kateryna Bondarenko upset Patty Schnyder, and 13th seed Marion Bartoli recovered in an all-French affair to beat Pauline Parmentier 3–6, 6–1, 6–3. Two more French wild cards fell as Uzbekistan's Akgul Amanmuradova defeated Irena Pavlovic and Australian Jarmila Groth beat Kinnie Laisné. Seeds Nikolay Davydenko, Robin Söderling, and Zheng Jie also advanced. Another of the day's upsets came at the hands Colombia's Mariana Duque Mariño, who beat former Top 5 player and 26th seeded Russia's Anna Chakvetadze, winning 3–6, 6–4, 6–4.

- Seeds out:
  - Men's Singles: (Czech Republic) Tomáš Berdych
  - Women's Singles: (Russia) Alisa Kleybanova, (Italy) Flavia Pennetta, (Switzerland) Patty Schnyder, (Russia) Anna Chakvetadze
- Schedule of Play

Matches on main courts
Matches on Court Philippe Chatrier (Center Court)
| Event | Winner | Loser | Score |
|---|---|---|---|
| Women's singles 1st round | (Russia) Dinara Safina (1) | (United Kingdom) Anne Keothavong | 6–0, 6–0 |
| Men's singles 1st round | (Spain) Rafael Nadal (1) | (Brazil) Marcos Daniel (Q) | 7–5, 6–4, 6–3 |
| Men's singles 1st round | (Switzerland) Roger Federer (2) | (Spain) Alberto Martín | 6–4, 6–3, 6–2 |
| Women's singles 1st round | (France) Marion Bartoli (13) | (France) Pauline Parmentier | 3–6, 6–1, 6–3 |
| Women's singles 1st round | (Denmark) Caroline Wozniacki (10) | (Russia) Vera Dushevina | 4–6, 7–5, 6–1 |
Matches on Court Suzanne Lenglen (Grandstand)
| Event | Winner | Loser | Score |
| Women's singles 1st round | (France) Aravane Rezaï | (Japan) Ai Sugiyama | 6–3, 6–2 |
| Women's singles 1st round | (United States) Venus Williams (3) | (United States) Bethanie Mattek-Sands | 6–1, 4–6, 6–2 |
| Men's singles 1st round | (France) Paul-Henri Mathieu (32) | (France) Laurent Recouderc | 6–4, 6–4, 6–1 |
| Men's singles 1st round | (United States) Andy Roddick (6) | (France) Romain Jouan (WC) | 6–2, 6–4, 6–2 |
| Women's singles 1st round | (Ukraine) Kateryna Bondarenko | (Switzerland) Patty Schnyder (17) | 6–4, 6–3 |

=== Day 3 (May 26) ===
Serbs Jelena Janković and Novak Djokovic had no problems in their first round matches, beating Petra Cetkovská and Nicolás Lapentti respectively. Serena Williams came through a tough tie – in which she squandered eight match points – against Czech Klára Zakopalová to win 6–3, 6–7(5), 6–4. All French seeds came through unscathed with victories for Marion Bartoli, Jo-Wilfried Tsonga, Paul-Henri Mathieu and Gaël Monfils. The United States' hopes of having a French Open champion took a big blow as James Blake and Mardy Fish both lost to Argentinian opponents. Fish lost to Máximo González 6–3, 1–6, 6–4, 7–6(4), and Blake, the highest seed to fall on Day 3, was beaten convincingly by Argentinian qualifier Leonardo Mayer 7–6(6), 7–5, 6–2. Number 27 seed Rainer Schüttler was comprehensively beaten by home favourite Marc Gicquel 6–0, 6–0, 6–4 and Chinese number 31 seed Peng Shuai was the only women's seed to go out, as she lost to Spain's María José Martínez Sánchez 1–6, 6–2, 6–4. There were victories for 10th seeded Dane Caroline Wozniacki, former finalist Svetlana Kuznetsova, Olympic gold medallist Elena Dementieva and World No. 5 Juan Martín del Potro.

- Seeds out:
  - Men's Singles: (Germany) Rainer Schüttler, (United States) Mardy Fish, (United States) James Blake
  - Women's Singles: (China) Peng Shuai
- Schedule of Play

Matches on main courts
Matches on Court Philippe Chatrier (Center Court)
| Event | Winner | Loser | Score |
|---|---|---|---|
| Women's singles 1st round | (Serbia) Jelena Janković (5) | (Czech Republic) Petra Cetkovská | 6–2, 6–3 |
| Men's singles 1st round | (Serbia) Novak Djokovic (4) | (Ecuador) Nicolás Lapentti | 6–3, 3–1 retired |
| Men's singles 1st round | (France) Jo-Wilfried Tsonga (9) | (France) Julien Benneteau | 6–4, 3–6, 6–3, 6–4 |
| Women's singles 1st round | (France) Alizé Cornet (21) vs. (Estonia) Maret Ani | | 6–4, 4–4 (suspended) |
Matches on Court Suzanne Lenglen (Grandstand)
| Event | Winner | Loser | Score |
| Women's singles 1st round | (Russia) Svetlana Kuznetsova (7) | (France) Claire Feuerstein | 6–1, 6–4 |
| Men's singles 1st round | (France) Gaël Monfils (11) | (United States) Bobby Reynolds | 6–2, 6–3, 6–1 |
| Women's singles 1st round | (United States) Serena Williams (2) | (Czech Republic) Klára Zakopalová | 6–3, 6–7(5), 6–4 |
| Men's singles 1st round | (Belgium) Christophe Rochus vs. (France) Fabrice Santoro | | 6–3, 6–1, 3–6, 5–4 (suspended) |

=== Day 4 (May 27) ===
Day 4 saw the start of the second round matches in both the men's and women's draws. The first match up on Court Philippe Chatrier was world number 3 Andy Murray, who he faced Italian world number 104 Potito Starace. Murray was made to work hard, as Starace took control of the tie and levelled the match at one set all. At 5–1 in the third set, Murray worked his way back to reel of 6 games in a row, and went on the win 6–3, 2–6, 7–5, 6–4. World number 1 Dinara Safina was first up on Court Suzanne Lenglen, and made light work of Vitalia Diatchenko, winning 6–1, 6–1. Defending women's champion Ana Ivanovic also won comprehensively, beating Tamarine Tanasugarn to enter the third round. French tennis fans had reason to cheer as number 15 seed Alizé Cornet resumed her match from day 3, and beat Maret Ani 6–4, 7–5 to advance to the second round. Another Frenchwoman, Aravane Rezaï beat Slovenian qualifier Polona Hercog to book a tie with Portuguese qualifier Michelle Larcher de Brito in the third round, who beat number 15 seed Zheng Jie earlier in the day. Unseeded Maria Sharapova faced number 11 seed Nadia Petrova in her first match against a top 20 player since her 10-month absence from the tour due to injury. A gutsy Sharapova came through with a 3 sets victory, 8–6 in the third. Gilles Simon was the only seeded Frenchman playing on day 4, and made swift work of American Robert Kendrick 7–5, 6–0, 6–1. Defending champion Rafael Nadal made history by becoming the first person to win 30 consecutive matches at Roland Garros by beating Teymuraz Gabashvili. French wildcard Josselin Ouanna caused perhaps the biggest upset of the day by beating number 20 seed Marat Safin in an epic five set match, in which he won the final set 10–8.

- Seeds out:
  - Men's Singles: (Russia) Dmitry Tursunov, (Spain) Feliciano López, (Russia) Marat Safin
  - Women's Singles: (China) Zheng Jie, (Russia) Nadia Petrova

The first matches of the doubles competition were played, with World No. 1 team Liezel Huber and Cara Black, Květa Peschke and Lisa Raymond, defending champions Anabel Medina Garrigues and Virginia Ruano Pascual, and Samantha Stosur and Rennae Stubbs were amongst the first to advance to the second round of the women's doubles.

On the men's side, defending champions Pablo Cuevas and Luis Horna, Lukáš Dlouhý and Leander Paes, Bruno Soares and Kevin Ullyett, and Mariusz Fyrstenberg and Marcin Matkowski all advanced to the second round. However, number 7 seeds Andy Ram and Max Mirnyi and number 10 seeds Marcelo Melo and André Sá suffered shock first-round defeats.

- Seeds out:
  - Men's Doubles: (Australia) Stephen Huss / (United Kingdom) Ross Hutchins, (Brazil) Marcelo Melo / (Brazil) André Sá, (Belarus) Max Mirnyi / (Israel) Andy Ram, (Czech Republic) Martin Damm / (Sweden) Robert Lindstedt
  - Women's Doubles: (Spain) Nuria Llagostera Vives / (Spain) María José Martínez Sánchez, (France) Nathalie Dechy / (Italy) Mara Santangelo

Schedule of play

Matches on main courts
Matches on Court Philippe Chatrier (Center Court)
| Event | Winner | Loser | Score |
|---|---|---|---|
| Men's singles 2nd round | (United Kingdom) Andy Murray (3) | (Italy) Potito Starace | 6–3, 2–6, 7–5, 6–4 |
| Women's singles 1st round | (France) Alizé Cornet (21) | (Estonia) Maret Ani | 6–4, 7–5 |
| Women's singles 2nd round | (Serbia) Ana Ivanovic (8) | (Thailand) Tamarine Tanasugarn | 6–1, 6–2 |
| Men's singles 2nd round | (France) Josselin Ouanna | (Russia) Marat Safin (20) | 7–6(2), 7–6(4), 4–6, 3–6, 10–8 |
| Women's singles 2nd round | (United States) Venus Williams (3) VS. (Czech Republic) Lucie Šafářová | | 6–7(5), 0–0 (suspended) |
Matches on Court Suzanne Lenglen (Grandstand)
| Event | Winner | Loser | Score |
| Women's singles 2nd round | (Russia) Dinara Safina (1) | (Russia) Vitalia Diatchenko | 6–1, 6–1 |
| Men's singles 1st round | (Belgium) Christophe Rochus | (France) Fabrice Santoro | 6–3, 6–1, 3–6, 6–4 |
| Men's singles 2nd round | (France) Gilles Simon (7) | (United States) Robert Kendrick | 7–5, 6–0, 6–1 |
| Women's singles 2nd round | (Russia) Maria Sharapova | (Russia) Nadia Petrova (11) | 6–2, 1–6, 8–6 |
| Men's singles 2nd round | (Spain) Rafael Nadal (1) | (Russia) Teymuraz Gabashvili | 6–1, 6–4, 6–2 |

=== Day 5 (May 28) ===
Day 5 got off to a slow start from a French perspective, as number 13 seed and home favourite Marion Bartoli succumbed to Tathiana Garbin of Italy in straight sets on Court Philippe Chatrier. And the day got worse for France as number 21 seed Alizé Cornet could not find her way past Romanian teenager Sorana Cîrstea. However, they did have some consolation, as Virginie Razzano navigated her way past Anabel Medina Garrigues, and booked a place in the third round to play Bartoli conqueror Garbin. On Court Suzanne Lenglen, Serb Jelena Janković had little problem in seeing off Slovakian opponent Magdaléna Rybáriková, 6–1, 6–2. Venus Williams was made to work very hard to make the third round, as she went the distance with Lucie Šafářová, narrowly winning the final set 7–5. There were also victories for Elena Dementieva, Agnieszka Radwańska, former finalist Svetlana Kuznetsova and 2002 champion Serena Williams.

Meanwhile, in the men's draw, Roger Federer was first up on Court Philippe Chatrier as he faced clay court specialist José Acasuso. Roger narrowly won the first set 7–6(8) in a first set tie-break, but Acasuso was not ready to falter, and came back stronger in the second set and eventually winning 7–5. Acasuso continued to put up strong resistance and took Federer to a third set tie-break, however Federer was too strong and won, from thereon Federer had little problem dispatching Acasuso winning the match 7–6(8), 5–7, 7–6(2), 6–2. Federer's victory set him up with a third round tie with Frenchman Paul-Henri Mathieu. After disappointed from the French ladies, the men did not disappoint. Jo-Wilfried Tsonga, Gaël Monfils and Jérémy Chardy and Marc Gicquel all advanced to the third round. No seeds were knocked out, as there were victories from number 5 seed Juan Martín del Potro, Andy Roddick and Tommy Robredo, Philipp Kohlschreiber and Igor Andreev and Jürgen Melzer.

- Seeds out:
  - Women's Singles: (France) Marion Bartoli, (Austria) Sybille Bammer, (France) Alizé Cornet, (Spain) Anabel Medina Garrigues

There was only one shocking exit from the men's doubles on the day, as Jeff Coetzee and Jordan Kerr were knocked out by the hands of Jaroslav Levinský and Igor Zelenay. Bob and Mike Bryan, Daniel Nestor and Nenad Zimonjić, Rik de Voest and Ashley Fisher, and Łukasz Kubot and Oliver Marach all secured places in the second round of the doubles.

There no upsets in the women's doubles, as all seeds made safe progress through to the second round including Serena and Venus Williams, and Květa Peschke and Lisa Raymond.

On day 5, the mixed doubles got under way, which saw just one upset. Nenad Zimonjić and Yan Zi fell to the hands of Bruno Soares and Alisa Kleybanova. Cara Black and Leander Paes, Lisa Raymond and Marcin Matkowski, Nadia Petrova and Max Mirnyi, and Elena Vesnina and Daniel Nestor all advanced to the second round.

- Seeds out:
  - Men's Doubles: (South Africa) Jeff Coetzee / (Australia) Jordan Kerr
  - Mixed Doubles: (Serbia) Nenad Zimonjić / (China) Yan Zi

Schedule of play

Matches on main courts
Matches on Court Philippe Chatrier (Center Court)
| Event | Winner | Loser | Score |
|---|---|---|---|
| Women's singles 2nd round | (Italy) Tathiana Garbin | (France) Marion Bartoli (13) | 6–3, 7–5 |
| Men's singles 2nd round | (Switzerland) Roger Federer (2) | (Argentina) José Acasuso | 7–6(8), 5–7, 7–6(2), 6–2 |
| Women's singles 2nd round | (United States) Serena Williams (2) | (Spain) Virginia Ruano Pascual | 6–2, 6–0 |
| Men's singles 2nd round | (France) Gaël Monfils (11) | (Romania) Victor Crivoi | 6–4, 6–3, 6–3 |
Matches on Court Suzanne Lenglen (Grandstand)
| Event | Winner | Loser | Score |
| Women's singles 2nd round | (Serbia) Jelena Janković (5) | (Slovakia) Magdaléna Rybáriková | 6–1, 6–2 |
| Women's singles 2nd round | (United States) Venus Williams (3) | (Czech Republic) Lucie Šafářová | 6–7(5), 6–2, 7–5 |
| Women's singles 2nd round | (Romania) Sorana Cîrstea | (France) Alizé Cornet (21) | 6–3, 6–2 |
| Men's singles 2nd round | (France) Jo-Wilfried Tsonga (9) | (Argentina) Juan Mónaco | 7–5, 2–6, 6–1, 7–6(8) |

=== Day 6 (May 29) ===
There were mixed French fortunes on Day 6. Aravane Rezaï beat Michelle Larcher de Brito to move into the fourth round. The newest French star, Josselin Ouanna, saw his run come to an end at the hands of 12th seeded Chilean Fernando González, 7–5, 6–3, 7–5. Following that, Gilles Simon, seeded 7th, suffered a collapse to 30th seed Victor Hănescu 6–4, 6–4, 6–2. Rafael Nadal, the four-time defending champion and World Number 1, looked in stellar form as he continued his undefeated run against Lleyton Hewitt, a former holder of the top ranking, 6–1, 6–3, 6–1. Stanislas Wawrinka was eliminated in four sets by tenth seeded Nikolay Davydenko, whilst Fernando Verdasco beat countryman Nicolás Almagro and Robin Söderling, the 23rd seed, set up a clash with Nadal by beating David Ferrer in four sets. Ágnes Szávay stunned third seed Venus Williams 6–0, 6–4, and Novak Djokovic beat Sergiy Stakhovsky. Additionally, defending champion Ana Ivanovic, Đoković's compatriot, advanced convincingly over Iveta Benešová, seeded 32nd, 6–0, 6–2. Andy Murray led Janko Tipsarević two sets to love before the Serb retired.

- Seeds out:
  - Men's Singles: (Spain) Nicolás Almagro, (Switzerland) Stanislas Wawrinka, (Czech Republic) Radek Štěpánek, (France) Gilles Simon, (Spain) David Ferrer
  - Women's Singles: (Czech Republic) Iveta Benešová, (United States) Venus Williams, (Russia) Anastasia Pavlyuchenkova
  - Men's Doubles: (United States) Travis Parrott / (Slovakia) Filip Polášek, (Czech Republic) František Čermák / (Slovakia) Michal Mertiňák, (Poland) Mariusz Fyrstenberg / (Poland) Marcin Matkowski, (Poland) Łukasz Kubot / (Austria) Oliver Marach
  - Women's Doubles: (Chinese Taipei) Chuang Chia-jung / (India) Sania Mirza
  - Mixed Doubles: (Australia) Stephen Huss / (Spain) Virginia Ruano Pascual

Schedule of play

Matches on main courts
Matches on Court Philippe Chatrier (Center Court)
| Event | Winner | Loser | Score |
|---|---|---|---|
| Women's singles 3rd round | (France) Aravane Rezaï | (Portugal) Michelle Larcher de Brito | 7–6(3), 6–2 |
| Men's singles 3rd round | (Chile) Fernando González (12) | (France) Josselin Ouanna | 7–5, 6–3, 7–5 |
| Men's singles 3rd round | (Spain) Rafael Nadal (1) | (Australia) Lleyton Hewitt | 6–1, 6–3, 6–1 |
| Women's singles 3rd round | (Russia) Maria Sharapova | (Kazakhstan) Yaroslava Shvedova | 1–6, 6–3, 6–4 |
Matches on Court Suzanne Lenglen (Grandstand)
| Event | Winner | Loser | Score |
| Women's singles 3rd round | (Serbia) Ana Ivanovic (8) | (Czech Republic) Iveta Benešová (32) | 6–0, 6–2 |
| Men's singles 2nd round | (Serbia) Novak Djokovic (4) | (Ukraine) Sergiy Stakhovsky | 6–3, 6–4, 6–1 |
| Women's singles 3rd round | (Hungary) Ágnes Szávay (29) | (United States) Venus Williams (3) | 6–0, 6–4 |
| Men's singles 3rd round | (Romania) Victor Hănescu (30) | (France) Gilles Simon (7) | 6–4, 6–4, 6–2 |
| Men's singles 3rd round | (United Kingdom) Andy Murray (3) | (Serbia) Janko Tipsarević | 7–6(3), 6–3 retired |

=== Day 7 (May 30) ===
- Seeds out:
  - Men's Singles: (Austria) Jürgen Melzer, (Serbia) Novak Djokovic, (France) Paul-Henri Mathieu
  - Women's Singles: (Russia) Elena Dementieva, (Spain) Carla Suárez Navarro, (Denmark) Caroline Wozniacki
  - Men's Doubles: (Uruguay) Pablo Cuevas / (Peru) Luis Horna
  - Women's Doubles: (Slovakia) Daniela Hantuchová / (Japan) Ai Sugiyama, (Russia) Maria Kirilenko / (Italy) Flavia Pennetta, (United States) Vania King / (Romania) Monica Niculescu
  - Mixed Doubles: (India) Leander Paes / (Zimbabwe) Cara Black

Schedule of play

Matches on main courts
Matches on Court Philippe Chatrier (Center Court)
| Event | Winner | Loser | Score |
|---|---|---|---|
| Women's singles 3rd round | (Australia) Samantha Stosur (30) | (Russia) Elena Dementieva (4) | 6–3, 4–6, 6–1 |
| Women's singles 3rd round | (France) Virginie Razzano | (Italy) Tathiana Garbin | 7–5, 7–5 |
| Men's singles 3rd round | (France) Jo-Wilfried Tsonga (9) | (Belgium) Christophe Rochus | 6–2, 6–2, 6–2 |
| Men's singles 3rd round | (Switzerland) Roger Federer (2) | (France) Paul-Henri Mathieu (32) | 4–6, 6–1, 6–4, 6–4 |
Matches on Court Suzanne Lenglen (Grandstand)
| Event | Winner | Loser | Score |
| Women's singles 3rd round | (Russia) Svetlana Kuznetsova (7) | (Hungary) Melinda Czink | 6–1, 6–3 |
| Men's singles 3rd round | (United States) Andy Roddick (6) | (France) Marc Gicquel | 6–1, 6–4, 6–4 |
| Men's singles 3rd round | (France) Gaël Monfils (11) | (Austria) Jürgen Melzer (24) | 6–2, 4–6, 6–3, 6–1 |
| Women's singles 3rd round | (United States) Serena Williams (2) | (Spain) María José Martínez Sánchez | 4–6, 6–3, 6–4 |

=== Day 8 (May 31) ===
Day 8 saw Rafael Nadal lose his first ever match at French Open to Swede Robin Söderling, which ended his streak of 31 wins in a row at Roland Garros. Also out was defending women's champion Ana Ivanovic. Former world number 1 Maria Sharapova continued her miraculous run by defeating Li Na 6–4, 0–6, 6–4 to reach the quarterfinals, after returning from nine months away from the game. Nikolay Davydenko beat Fernando Verdasco to advance to the quarters with Söderling. Fernando González beat Victor Hănescu in straight sets to set up a quarterfinal with number four Andy Murray, a winner over Marin Čilić in tight but straight sets. World Number 1 Dinara Safina continued her dominant run of losing just 5 games all tournament against Aravane Rezaï, winning 6–1, 6–0.

- Seeds out:
  - Men's Singles: (Romania) Victor Hănescu, (Croatia) Marin Čilić, (Spain) Rafael Nadal, (Spain) Fernando Verdasco
  - Women's Singles: (Hungary) Ágnes Szávay, (Serbia) Ana Ivanovic, (China) Li Na
  - Men's Doubles: (South Africa) Rik de Voest / (Australia) Ashley Fisher, (India) Mahesh Bhupathi / (The Bahamas) Mark Knowles
  - Women's Doubles: (Australia) Samantha Stosur / (Australia) Rennae Stubbs, (Czech Republic) Květa Peschke / (United States) Lisa Raymond, (United States) Venus Williams / (United States) Serena Williams
  - Mixed Doubles: (Canada) Daniel Nestor / (Russia) Elena Vesnina

Schedule of play

Matches on main courts
Matches on Court Philippe Chatrier (Center Court)
| Event | Winner | Loser | Score |
|---|---|---|---|
| Men's singles 4th round | (Chile) Fernando González (12) | (Romania) Victor Hănescu (30) | 6–2, 6–4, 6–2 |
| Women's singles 4th round | (Russia) Dinara Safina (1) | (France) Aravane Rezaï | 6–1, 6–0 |
| Men's singles 4th round | (Sweden) Robin Söderling (23) | (Spain) Rafael Nadal (1) | 6–2, 6–7(2), 6–4, 7–6(2) |
| Women's singles 4th round | (Russia) Maria Sharapova | (China) Li Na (25) | 6–4, 0–6, 6–4 |
Matches on Court Suzanne Lenglen (Grandstand)
| Event | Winner | Loser | Score |
| Women's singles 4th round | (Slovakia) Dominika Cibulková (20) | (Hungary) Ágnes Szávay (29) | 6–2, 6–4 |
| Men's singles 4th round | (United Kingdom) Andy Murray (3) | (Croatia) Marin Čilić (13) | 7–5, 7–6(4), 6–1 |
| Women's singles 4th round | (Belarus) Victoria Azarenka (9) | (Serbia) Ana Ivanovic (8) | 6–2, 6–3 |
| Men's singles 4th round | (Russia) Nikolay Davydenko (10) | (Spain) Fernando Verdasco (8) | 6–2, 6–2, 6–4 |

=== Day 9 (June 1) ===
- Seeds out:
  - Men's Singles: (Germany) Philipp Kohlschreiber, (France) Jo-Wilfried Tsonga, (United States) Andy Roddick
  - Women's Singles: (Canada) Aleksandra Wozniak, (Poland) Agnieszka Radwańska, (Serbia) Jelena Janković
  - Men's Doubles: (Brazil) Bruno Soares / (Zimbabwe) Kevin Ullyett
  - Women's Doubles: (China) Yan Zi / (China) Zheng Jie, (Germany) Anna-Lena Grönefeld / (Switzerland) Patty Schnyder
  - Mixed Doubles: (Brazil) André Sá / (Japan) Ai Sugiyama, (Poland) Marcin Matkowski / (United States) Lisa Raymond

Schedule of play

Matches on main courts
Matches on Court Philippe Chatrier (Center Court)
| Event | Winner | Loser | Score |
|---|---|---|---|
| Women's singles 4th round | (United States) Serena Williams (2) | (Canada) Aleksandra Wozniak (24) | 6–1, 6–2 |
| Men's singles 4th round | (Switzerland) Roger Federer (2) | (Germany) Tommy Haas | 6–7(4), 5–7, 6–4, 6–0, 6–2 |
| Men's singles 4th round | (Argentina) Juan Martín del Potro (5) | (France) Jo-Wilfried Tsonga (9) | 6–1, 6–7(5), 6–1, 6–4 |
| Women's singles 4th round | (Australia) Samantha Stosur (30) | (France) Virginie Razzano | 6–1, 6–2 |
Matches on Court Suzanne Lenglen (Grandstand)
| Event | Winner | Loser | Score |
| Women's singles 4th round | (Russia) Svetlana Kuznetsova (7) | (Poland) Agnieszka Radwańska (12) | 6–4, 1–6, 6–1 |
| Men's singles 4th round | (Spain) Tommy Robredo (16) | (Germany) Philipp Kohlschreiber (29) | 6–4, 5–7, 7–6(4), 6–2 |
| Women's singles 4th round | (Romania) Sorana Cîrstea | (Serbia) Jelena Janković (5) | 3–6, 6–0, 9–7 |
| Men's singles 4th round | (France) Gaël Monfils (11) | (United States) Andy Roddick (6) | 6–4, 6–2, 6–3 |

=== Day 10 (June 2) ===
- Seeds out:
  - Men's Singles: (Russia) Nikolay Davydenko, (United Kingdom) Andy Murray
  - Women's Singles: (Belarus) Victoria Azarenka
  - Women's Doubles: (United States) Bethanie Mattek-Sands / (Russia) Nadia Petrova

Schedule of play

Matches on main courts
Matches on Court Philippe Chatrier (Center Court)
| Event | Winner | Loser | Score |
|---|---|---|---|
| Women's singles quarterfinal | (Russia) Dinara Safina (1) | (Belarus) Victoria Azarenka (9) | 1–6, 6–4, 6–2 |
| Men's singles quarterfinal | (Chile) Fernando González (12) | (United Kingdom) Andy Murray (3) | 6–3, 3–6, 6–0, 6–4 |
| Mixed doubles quarterfinal | (Russia) Nadia Petrova (4) (Belarus) Max Mirnyi (4) | (France) Nathalie Dechy (Israel) Andy Ram | 6–3, 6–1 |
Matches on Court Suzanne Lenglen (Grandstand)
| Event | Winner | Loser | Score |
| Men's singles quarterfinal | (Sweden) Robin Söderling (23) | (Russia) Nikolay Davydenko (10) | 6–1, 6–3, 6–1 |
| Women's singles quarterfinal | (Slovakia) Dominika Cibulková (20) | (Russia) Maria Sharapova | 6–0, 6–2 |
| Women's doubles quarterfinal | (Chinese Taipei) Su-wei Hsieh (9) (China) Peng Shuai (9) | (Poland) Agnieszka Radwańska (Poland) Urszula Radwańska | 2–6, 6–4, 7–5 |

=== Day 11 (June 3) ===
- Seeds out:
  - Men's Singles: (France) Gaël Monfils, (Spain) Tommy Robredo
  - Women's Singles: (United States) Serena Williams
  - Women's Doubles: (Zimbabwe) Cara Black / (United States) Liezel Huber, (Chinese Taipei) Su-wei Hsieh / (China) Peng Shuai
  - Mixed Doubles: (Russia) Nadia Petrova / (Belarus) Max Mirnyi

Schedule of play

Matches on main courts
Matches on Court Philippe Chatrier (Center Court)
| Event | Winner | Loser | Score |
|---|---|---|---|
| Women's singles quarterfinal | (Australia) Samantha Stosur (30) | (Romania) Sorana Cîrstea | 6–1, 6–3 |
| Men's singles quarterfinal | (Switzerland) Roger Federer (2) | (France) Gaël Monfils (11) | 7–6(6), 6–2, 6–4 |
| Mixed doubles semifinal | (United States) Liezel Huber (1) (United States) Bob Bryan (1) | (Germany) Anna-Lena Grönefeld (The Bahamas) Mark Knowles | 6–2, 6–2 |
Matches on Court Suzanne Lenglen (Grandstand)
| Event | Winner | Loser | Score |
| Women's singles quarterfinal | (Russia) Svetlana Kuznetsova (7) | (United States) Serena Williams (2) | 7–6(3), 5–7, 7–5 |
| Men's singles quarterfinal | (Argentina) Juan Martín del Potro (5) | (Spain) Tommy Robredo (16) | 6–3, 6–4, 6–2 |

=== Day 12 (June 4) ===
- Seeds out:
  - Women's Singles: (Slovakia) Dominika Cibulková, (Australia) Samantha Stosur
  - Men's Doubles: (United States) Bob Bryan / (United States) Mike Bryan, (Canada) Daniel Nestor / (Serbia) Nenad Zimonjić

Schedule of play

Matches on main courts
Matches on Court Philippe Chatrier (Center Court)
| Event | Winner | Loser | Score |
|---|---|---|---|
| Women's singles semifinal | (Russia) Dinara Safina (1) | (Slovakia) Dominika Cibulková (20) | 6–3, 6–3 |
| Women's singles semifinal | (Russia) Svetlana Kuznetsova (7) | (Australia) Samantha Stosur (30) | 6–4, 6–7(5), 6–3 |
| Mixed doubles final | (United States) Liezel Huber (1) (United States) Bob Bryan (1) | (United States) Vania King (Brazil) Marcelo Melo | 5–7, 7–6(5), 10–7 |
Matches on Court Suzanne Lenglen (Grandstand)
| Event | Winner | Loser | Score |
| Legends Under 45 doubles | (Australia) Pat Cash (Spain) Emilio Sánchez | (Croatia) Goran Ivanišević (Germany) Michael Stich | 6–3, 2–6, 10–5 |
| Men's doubles semifinal | (South Africa) Wesley Moodie (Belgium) Dick Norman | (United States) Bob Bryan (2) (United States) Mike Bryan (2) | 0–6, 7–6(5), 6–4 |
| Men's doubles semifinal | (Czech Republic) Lukáš Dlouhý (3) (India) Leander Paes (3) | (Canada) Daniel Nestor (1) (Serbia) Nenad Zimonjić (1) | 7–6(4), 7–6(5) |
| Legends Under 45 doubles | (Netherlands) Paul Haarhuis (France) Cédric Pioline | (Spain) Sergi Bruguera (Netherlands) Richard Krajicek | 2–6, 7–6(4), 10–5 |
| Legends Over 45 doubles | (Ecuador) Andrés Gómez (Paraguay) Víctor Pecci | (Australia) Peter McNamara (Romania) Ilie Năstase | 6–2, 6–1 |

=== Day 13 (June 5) ===
- Seeds out:
  - Men's Singles: (Chile) Fernando González, (Argentina) Juan Martín del Potro
  - Women's Doubles: (Belarus) Victoria Azarenka / (Russia) Elena Vesnina

Schedule of play

Matches on main courts
Matches on Court Philippe Chatrier (Center Court)
| Event | Winner | Loser | Score |
|---|---|---|---|
| Men's singles semifinal | (Sweden) Robin Söderling (23) | (Chile) Fernando González (12) | 6–3, 7–5, 5–7, 4–6, 6–4 |
| Men's singles semifinal | (Switzerland) Roger Federer (2) | (Argentina) Juan Martín del Potro (5) | 3–6, 7–6(2), 2–6, 6–1, 6–4 |
Matches on Court Suzanne Lenglen (Grandstand)
| Event | Winner | Loser | Score |
| Legends Over 45 doubles | (Sweden) Anders Järryd (United States) John McEnroe | (Australia) John Fitzgerald (Argentina) Guillermo Vilas | 6–2, 6–3 |
| Legends Under 45 doubles | (Croatia) Goran Ivanišević (Germany) Michael Stich | (Russia) Yevgeny Kafelnikov (Austria) Thomas Muster | 6–3, 7–5 |
| Legends Over 45 doubles | (Iran) Mansour Bahrami (France) Henri Leconte | (Ecuador) Andrés Gómez (Paraguay) Víctor Pecci | 6–4, 7–6(4) |
| Women's doubles final | (Spain) Anabel Medina Garrigues (3) (Spain) Virginia Ruano Pascual (3) | (Belarus) Victoria Azarenka (12) (Russia) Elena Vesnina (12) | 6–1, 6–1 |

=== Day 14 (June 6) ===
- Seeds out:
  - Women's Singles: (Russia) Dinara Safina

Schedule of play

Matches on main courts
Matches on Court Philippe Chatrier (Center Court)
| Event | Winner | Loser | Score |
|---|---|---|---|
| Women's singles final | (Russia) Svetlana Kuznetsova (7) | (Russia) Dinara Safina (1) | 6–4, 6–2 |
| Men's doubles final | (Czech Republic) Lukáš Dlouhý (3) (India) Leander Paes (3) | (South Africa) Wesley Moodie (Belgium) Dick Norman | 3–6, 6–3, 6–2 |
Matches on Court Suzanne Lenglen (Grandstand)
| Event | Winner | Loser | Score |
| Legends Under 45 doubles | (Spain) Sergi Bruguera (Netherlands) Richard Krajicek | (France) Arnaud Boetsch (France) Guy Forget | 6–1, 7–6(2) |
| Legends Over 45 doubles | (Sweden) Mikael Pernfors (Sweden) Mats Wilander | (Australia) John Fitzgerald (Argentina) Guillermo Vilas | 6–3, 6–3 |
| Legends Under 45 doubles | (Australia) Pat Cash (Spain) Emilio Sánchez | (Russia) Yevgeny Kafelnikov (Austria) Thomas Muster | 6–3, 7–5 |

=== Day 15 (June 7) ===
The men's singles final was briefly interrupted as Jimmy Jump carrying a FC Barcelona banner ran onto the court during the second set, running around Roger Federer and even putting a cap on him, then jumping over the net before being taken out by security. This is the first time this has ever happened at the French Open, however the occurrence did not seem to throw off Federer, as he won the set, and eventually the match. Federer also completed a career Grand Slam and tied Pete Sampras's record of 14 Grand Slam titles after winning the French Open.

- Seeds out:
  - Men's Singles: (Sweden) Robin Söderling

Schedule of play

Matches on main courts
Matches on Court Philippe Chatrier (Center Court)
| Event | Winner | Loser | Score |
|---|---|---|---|
| Men's singles final | (Switzerland) Roger Federer (2) | (Sweden) Robin Söderling (23) | 6–1, 7–6(1), 6–4 |
Matches on Court Suzanne Lenglen (Grandstand)
| Event | Winner | Loser | Score |
| Boys' singles final | (Sweden) Daniel Berta | (France) Gianni Mina (11) | 6–1, 3–6, 6–3 |
| Girls' singles final | (France) Kristina Mladenovic (9) | (Russia) Daria Gavrilova | 6–3, 6–2 |

== Finals ==
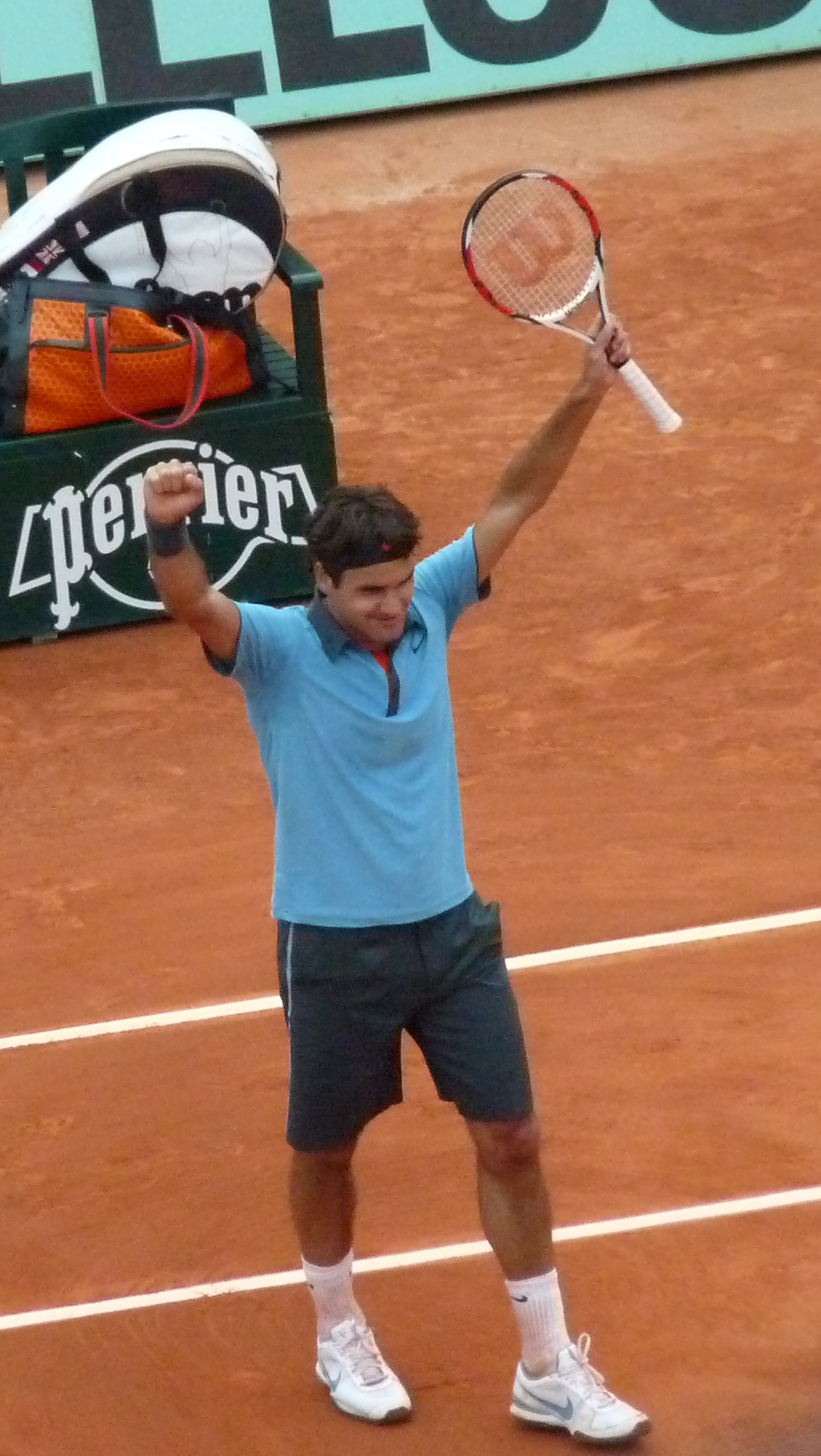
Federer completed a career Grand Slam and won his 14th career slam tournament tying Pete Sampras for all-time grand slams by winning the 2009 French Open.

=== Men's singles ===
(Switzerland) Roger Federer defeated (Sweden) Robin Söderling, 6–1, 7–6(1), 6–4

- It was Federer's 2nd title of the year, and his 59th overall. It was his 14th career Grand Slam title (tying the all-time record set by Pete Sampras) and his 1st French Open title. In winning the French Open, Federer completed the career grand slam.

=== Women's singles ===
(Russia) Svetlana Kuznetsova defeated (Russia) Dinara Safina, 6–4, 6–2

- It was Kuznetsova's 2nd title of the year, and her 11th overall. It was her 2nd career Grand Slam title, and her 1st French Open title.

=== Men's doubles ===
(Czech Republic) Lukáš Dlouhý / (India) Leander Paes defeated (South Africa) Wesley Moodie / (Belgium) Dick Norman, 3–6, 6–3, 6–2

- It was Dlouhý's 1st career Grand Slam title.
- It was Paes' 5th career Grand Slam title, and his 2nd at the French Open.

=== Women's doubles ===
(Spain) Anabel Medina / (Spain) Virginia Ruano Pascual defeated (Belarus) Victoria Azarenka / (Russia) Elena Vesnina, 6–1, 6–1

- It was Medina's 2nd career Grand Slam title, and her 2nd (consecutive) at the French Open.
- It was Ruano Pascual's 10th career Grand Slam title, and her 6th at the French Open.

=== Mixed doubles ===
(United States) Liezel Huber / (United States) Bob Bryan defeated (United States) Vania King / (Brazil) Marcelo Melo, 5–7, 7–6(5), 10–7

== Juniors ==
=== Boys' singles ===
(Sweden) Daniel Berta defeated (France) Gianni Mina, 6–1, 3–6, 6–3

=== Girls' singles ===
(France) Kristina Mladenovic defeated (Russia) Daria Gavrilova, 6–3, 6–2

=== Boys' doubles ===
(Croatia) Marin Draganja / (Croatia) Dino Marcan defeated (Brazil) Guilherme Clezar / (Chinese Taipei) Huang Liang-chi, 6–3, 6–2

=== Girls' doubles ===
(Romania) Elena Bogdan / (Thailand) Noppawan Lertcheewakarn defeated (Hungary) Tímea Babos / (United Kingdom) Heather Watson, 3–6, 6–3, 10–8

== Other events ==
=== Legends under 45 doubles ===
(Netherlands) Paul Haarhuis / (France) Cédric Pioline defeated (Australia) Pat Cash / (Spain) Emilio Sánchez, 6–3, 6–4

=== Legends over 45 doubles ===
(Sweden) Anders Järryd / (United States) John McEnroe defeated (Iran) Mansour Bahrami / (France) Henri Leconte, 7–6(2), 6–1

=== Wheelchair men's singles ===
(Japan) Shingo Kunieda defeated (France) Stéphane Houdet, 6–3, 3–6, 6–3

=== Wheelchair women's singles ===
(Netherlands) Esther Vergeer defeated (Netherlands) Korie Homan, 6–2, 7–5

=== Wheelchair men's doubles ===
(France) Stéphane Houdet / (France) Michaël Jérémiasz defeated (Netherlands) Robin Ammerlaan / (Netherlands) Maikel Scheffers, 6–2, 7–5

=== Wheelchair women's doubles ===
(Netherlands) Korie Homan / (Netherlands) Esther Vergeer defeated (Belgium) Annick Sevenans / (Netherlands) Aniek van Koot, 6–2, 6–3

== Seeds ==
Withdrawals: David Nalbandian, Richard Gasquet, Katarina Srebotnik, Vera Zvonareva.

=== Men's singles ===
1. (Spain) Rafael Nadal (fourth round, lost to Robin Söderling)
2. (Switzerland) Roger Federer (champion)
3. (United Kingdom) Andy Murray (quarterfinals, lost to Fernando González)
4. (Serbia) Novak Djokovic (third round, lost to Philipp Kohlschreiber)
5. (Argentina) Juan Martín del Potro (semifinals, lost to Roger Federer)
6. (United States) Andy Roddick (fourth round, lost to Gaël Monfils)
7. (France) Gilles Simon (third round, lost to Victor Hănescu)
8. (Spain) Fernando Verdasco (fourth round, lost to Nikolay Davydenko)
9. (France) Jo-Wilfried Tsonga (fourth round, lost to Juan Martín del Potro)
10. (Russia) Nikolay Davydenko (quarterfinals, lost to Robin Söderling)
11. (France) Gaël Monfils (quarterfinals, lost to Roger Federer)
12. (Chile) Fernando González (semifinals, lost to Robin Söderling)
13. (Croatia) Marin Čilić (fourth round, lost to Andy Murray)
14. (Spain) David Ferrer (third round, lost to Robin Söderling)
15. (United States) James Blake (first round, lost to Leonardo Mayer)
16. (Spain) Tommy Robredo (fourth round, lost to Juan Martín del Potro)
17. (Switzerland) Stanislas Wawrinka (third round, lost to Nikolay Davydenko)
18. (Czech Republic) Radek Štěpánek (third round, lost to Marin Čilić)
19. (Czech Republic) Tomáš Berdych (first round, lost to Simone Bolelli)
20. (Russia) Marat Safin (second round, lost to Josselin Ouanna)
21. (Russia) Dmitry Tursunov (first round, lost to Arnaud Clément)
22. (United States) Mardy Fish (first round, lost to Máximo González)
23. (Sweden) Robin Söderling (final, lost to Roger Federer)
24. (Austria) Jürgen Melzer (third round, lost to Gaël Monfils)
25. (Russia) Igor Andreev (third round, lost to Juan Martín del Potro)
26. (Croatia) Ivo Karlović (first round, lost to Lleyton Hewitt)
27. (Germany) Rainer Schüttler (first round, lost to Marc Gicquel)
28. (Spain) Feliciano López (second round, lost to Janko Tipsarević)
29. (Germany) Philipp Kohlschreiber (fourth round, lost to Tommy Robredo)
30. (Romania) Victor Hănescu (fourth round, lost to Fernando González)
31. (Spain) Nicolás Almagro (third round, lost to Fernando Verdasco)
32. (France) Paul-Henri Mathieu (third round, lost to Roger Federer)

=== Women's singles ===
1. (Russia) Dinara Safina (final, lost to Svetlana Kuznetsova)
2. (United States) Serena Williams (quarterfinals, lost to Svetlana Kuznetsova)
3. (United States) Venus Williams (third round, lost to Ágnes Szávay)
4. (Russia) Elena Dementieva (third round, lost to Samantha Stosur)
5. (Serbia) Jelena Janković (fourth round, lost to Sorana Cîrstea)
6. (Russia) Vera Zvonareva (withdrew due to ankle injury)
7. (Russia) Svetlana Kuznetsova (champion)
8. (Serbia) Ana Ivanovic (fourth round, lost to Victoria Azarenka)
9. (Belarus) Victoria Azarenka (quarterfinals, lost to Dinara Safina)
10. (Denmark) Caroline Wozniacki (third round, lost to Sorana Cîrstea)
11. (Russia) Nadia Petrova (second round, lost to Maria Sharapova)
12. (Poland) Agnieszka Radwańska (fourth round, lost to Svetlana Kuznetsova)
13. (France) Marion Bartoli (second round, lost to Tathiana Garbin)
14. (Italy) Flavia Pennetta (first round, lost to Alexa Glatch)
15. (China) Zheng Jie (second round, lost to Michelle Larcher de Brito)
16. (France) Amélie Mauresmo (first round, lost to Anna-Lena Grönefeld)
17. (Switzerland) Patty Schnyder (first round, lost to Kateryna Bondarenko)
18. (Spain) Anabel Medina Garrigues (second round, lost to Virginie Razzano)
19. (Estonia) Kaia Kanepi (first round, lost to Yaroslava Shvedova)
20. (Slovakia) Dominika Cibulková (semifinals, lost to Dinara Safina)
21. (France) Alizé Cornet (second round, lost to Sorana Cîrstea)
22. (Spain) Carla Suárez Navarro (third round, lost to Victoria Azarenka)
23. (Russia) Alisa Kleybanova (first round, lost to Polona Hercog)
24. (Canada) Aleksandra Wozniak (fourth round, lost to Serena Williams)
25. (China) Li Na (fourth round, lost to Maria Sharapova)
26. (Russia) Anna Chakvetadze (first round, lost to Mariana Duque Mariño)
27. (Russia) Anastasia Pavlyuchenkova (third round, lost to Dinara Safina)
28. (Austria) Sybille Bammer (second round, lost to Melinda Czink)
29. (Hungary) Ágnes Szávay (fourth round, lost to Dominika Cibulková)
30. (Australia) Samantha Stosur (semifinals, lost to Svetlana Kuznetsova)
31. (China) Peng Shuai (first round, lost to María José Martínez Sánchez)
32. (Czech Republic) Iveta Benešová (third round, lost to Ana Ivanovic)

== Wildcard entries ==
Below are the lists of the wildcard awardees entering in the main draws.

=== Men's singles wildcard entries ===
1. (Argentina) Gastón Gaudio
2. (France) Romain Jouan
3. (France) Adrian Mannarino
4. (France) Josselin Ouanna
5. (France) Laurent Recouderc
6. (France) Guillaume Rufin
7. (France) Alexandre Sidorenko
8. (Australia) Bernard Tomic

=== Women's singles wildcard entries ===
1. (United States) Lauren Embree
2. (France) Claire Feuerstein
3. (France) Kinnie Laisné
4. (France) Émilie Loit
5. (France) Kristina Mladenovic
6. (France) Irena Pavlovic
7. (Australia) Olivia Rogowska
8. (France) Olivia Sanchez

=== Men's doubles wildcard entries ===
1. (France) Julien Benneteau / (France) Nicolas Mahut
2. (France) Sébastien de Chaunac / (France) Benoît Paire
3. (France) Sébastien Grosjean / (Ecuador) Nicolás Lapentti
4. (France) Jérôme Haehnel / (France) Florent Serra
5. (France) Michaël Llodra / (France) Fabrice Santoro
6. (France) Mathieu Montcourt / (France) Édouard Roger-Vasselin
7. (France) Josselin Ouanna / (France) Jo-Wilfried Tsonga

=== Women's doubles wildcard entries ===
1. (Slovakia) Dominika Cibulková / (France) Virginie Razzano
2. (France) Stéphanie Foretz / (France) Camille Pin
3. (France) Violette Huck / (France) Laura Thorpe
4. (Ukraine) Viktoriya Kutuzova / (France) Aravane Rezaï
5. (France) Kinnie Laisné / (France) Stéphanie Vongsouthi
6. (France) Sophie Lefèvre / (France) Aurélie Védy
7. (France) Émilie Loit / (France) Kristina Mladenovic

=== Mixed doubles wildcard entries ===
1. (France) Séverine Brémond Beltrame / (Sweden) Robert Lindstedt
2. (France) Stéphanie Cohen-Aloro / (France) Thierry Ascione
3. (France) Julie Coin / (France) Nicolas Mahut
4. (France) Pauline Parmentier / (France) Marc Gicquel
5. ~~(France) Camille Pin~~ / ~~(France) Gilles Simon~~ (withdrew)
6. (France) Aurélie Védy / (France) Josselin Ouanna

== Qualifiers entries ==
=== Men's singles ===
1. (Italy) Fabio Fognini
2. (Argentina) Leonardo Mayer
3. (Brazil) Marcos Daniel
4. (Romania) Victor Crivoi
5. (Serbia) Ilija Bozoljac
6. (Germany) Daniel Brands
7. (Monaco) Jean-René Lisnard
8. (Colombia) Santiago Giraldo
9. (Ukraine) Sergiy Stakhovsky
10. (Germany) Simon Greul
11. (Canada) Peter Polansky
12. (Brazil) Franco Ferreiro
13. (Poland) Łukasz Kubot
14. (Spain) Santiago Ventura
15. (Czech Republic) Jiří Vaněk
16. (Portugal) Rui Machado

Lucky losers

1. (Brazil) Thiago Alves
2. (France) Mathieu Montcourt

=== Women's singles ===
1. (Kazakhstan) Yaroslava Shvedova
2. (Czech Republic) Zuzana Ondrášková
3. (Latvia) Anastasija Sevastova
4. (Slovenia) Polona Hercog
5. (South Africa) Chanelle Scheepers
6. (Russia) Vitalia Diatchenko
7. (Portugal) Michelle Larcher de Brito
8. (Netherlands) Arantxa Rus
9. (Italy) Corinna Dentoni
10. (Austria) Yvonne Meusburger
11. (Croatia) Petra Martić
12. (United States) Carly Gullickson

Lucky losers

1. (United Kingdom) Katie O'Brien
2. (Colombia) Mariana Duque Mariño

== Protected ranking ==
The following players have been accepted directly into the main draw using a protected ranking:

Men's Singles

- (Argentina) Juan Ignacio Chela
- (Austria) Stefan Koubek
- (Romania) Andrei Pavel

Women's Singles

- (Argentina) María Emilia Salerni

== Withdrawals ==
Men's Singles

- (Croatia) Mario Ančić → replaced by (France) Mathieu Montcourt
- (France) Richard Gasquet → replaced by (Kazakhstan) Andrey Golubev
- (Spain) Carlos Moyá → replaced by (Belgium) Steve Darcis
- (Argentina) David Nalbandian → replaced by (Austria) Daniel Köllerer
- (Finland) Jarkko Nieminen → replaced by (United States) Kevin Kim
- (Japan) Kei Nishikori → replaced by (Argentina) Brian Dabul
- (Germany) Björn Phau → replaced by (Brazil) Thiago Alves

Women's Singles

- (Chinese Taipei) Chan Yung-jan → replaced by (Poland) Marta Domachowska
- (Australia) Casey Dellacqua → replaced by (Romania) Raluca Olaru
- (New Zealand) Marina Erakovic → replaced by (United Kingdom) Melanie South
- (Czech Republic) Petra Kvitová → replaced by (Colombia) Mariana Duque Mariño
- (Israel) Shahar Pe'er → replaced by (United States) Alexa Glatch
- (United States) Meghann Shaughnessy → replaced by (Italy) Mara Santangelo
- (Slovenia) Katarina Srebotnik → replaced by (United States) Varvara Lepchenko
- (Russia) Vera Zvonareva → replaced by (United Kingdom) Katie O'Brien

== Media coverage ==
In the US, coverage was provided by The Tennis Channel. In France, the French Open is broadcast live by France Télévisions and Eurosport. In the UK and Republic of Ireland it is broadcast live by BBC and Eurosport, Irish viewers can also watch live on TG4. In Switzerland it is broadcast live by SF, Radiotelevisione svizzera di lingua italiana and Télévision Suisse Romande. In Serbia, it is broadcast live by RTS and Eurosport. In Sweden (Robin Söderling's home country), it is broadcast live by Eurosport and SVT also broadcast the men's final live.

| Preceded by 2009 Australian Open | Grand Slams | Succeeded by 2009 Wimbledon |
