= 2013 Open GDF Suez Nantes Atlantique – Doubles =

Doubles
- 2013 Open GDF Suez Nantes Atlantique

Final
- Champions: (Czech Republic) Lucie Hradecká (Netherlands) Michaëlla Krajicek
- Runners-up: (France) Stéphanie Foretz Gacon (Czech Republic) Eva Hrdinová
- Score: 6–3, 6–2

Events
Singles	Doubles
← 2012 ·	Open GDF Suez Nantes Atlantique	· 2014 →

Catalina Castaño and Mervana Jugić-Salkić were the defending champions, having won the event in 2012, but both players decided not to participate in 2013.

Lucie Hradecká and Michaëlla Krajicek won the tournament, defeating Stéphanie Foretz Gacon and Eva Hrdinová in the final, 6–3, 6–2.

== Seeds ==
1. (France) Stéphanie Foretz Gacon / (Czech Republic) Eva Hrdinová (final)
2. (Czech Republic) Lucie Hradecká / (Netherlands) Michaëlla Krajicek (champions)
3. (Ukraine) Lyudmyla Kichenok / (Ukraine) Nadiya Kichenok (semifinals)
4. (Spain) Lara Arruabarrena / (Russia) Valeria Savinykh (semifinals)

== Draw ==
=== Key ===
- Q = Qualifier
- WC = Wild card
- LL = Lucky loser
- Alt = Alternate
- SE = Special exempt
- PR = Protected ranking
- ITF = ITF entry
- JE = Junior exempt
- w/o = Walkover
- r = Retired
- d = Defaulted
- SR = Special ranking

First round
(France) A Hesse (Germany) C Shakovets	6	7^{7}
(France) É Busson (France) M Georges	4	6^{5}
4	(Spain) L Arruabarrena (Russia) V Savinykh	6	6
(Belgium) M Boev (Bulgaria) V Tomova	2	1
(Italy) N Clerico (Czech Republic) N Fraňková	7	6
(Chile) C Costa Melgar (Chile) D Seguel	5	4
(Austria) Y Neuwirth (Germany) J Steinherr	1	3
(Switzerland) V Golubic (Poland) M Linette	6	6
(Russia) J Kushnereva (Netherlands) C Mulder	0	0
3	(Ukraine) L Kichenok (Ukraine) N Kichenok	6	6
(Georgia (country)) M Chakhnashvili (Russia) N Orlova	3	0
(United States) N Melichar (Serbia) T Mirčić	6	6
(Ukraine) A Fomina (Slovenia) A Prislan	6^{4}	4
2	(Czech Republic) L Hradecká (Netherlands) M Krajicek	7^{7}	6

Quarterfinals
1	(France) S Foretz Gacon (Czech Republic) E Hrdinová	6	6
(France) A Hesse (Germany) C Shakovets	2	2
4	(Spain) L Arruabarrena (Russia) V Savinykh	6	6^{6}	[10]
(Italy) N Clerico (Czech Republic) N Fraňková	4	7^{8}	[8]
(Switzerland) V Golubic (Poland) M Linette	3	4
3	(Ukraine) L Kichenok (Ukraine) N Kichenok	6	6
(United States) N Melichar (Serbia) T Mirčić	1	1
2	(Czech Republic) L Hradecká (Netherlands) M Krajicek	6	6

Semifinals
1	(France) S Foretz Gacon (Czech Republic) E Hrdinová	7	6
4	(Spain) L Arruabarrena (Russia) V Savinykh	5	2
3	(Ukraine) L Kichenok (Ukraine) N Kichenok	2	2
2	(Czech Republic) L Hradecká (Netherlands) M Krajicek	6	6

Final
1	(France) S Foretz Gacon (Czech Republic) E Hrdinová	3	2
2	(Czech Republic) L Hradecká (Netherlands) M Krajicek	6	6
