= 2009 French Open – Women's singles =

Women's singles
- 2009 French Open

Final
- Champion: (Russia) Svetlana Kuznetsova
- Runner-up: (Russia) Dinara Safina
- Score: 6–4, 6–2

Events
Singles	men	women		boys	girls
Doubles	men	women	mixed	boys	girls
WC Singles	men	women	quad
WC Doubles	men	women	quad
Legends	−45	45+	women
- French Open

Svetlana Kuznetsova defeated Dinara Safina in the final, 6–4, 6–2 to win the women's singles tennis title at the 2009 French Open. It was her second and last major singles title, after the 2004 US Open. It was Safina's third runner-up finish in as many major finals. The match was also the conclusion of a series of finals between the pair during that clay court season, as they each claimed the Stuttgart and Rome titles over each other.

Ana Ivanovic was the defending champion, but lost in the fourth round to Victoria Azarenka.

Sorana Cîrstea became the first player born in the 1990s to reach a major quarterfinal.

== Seeds ==
1. (Russia) Dinara Safina (final)
2. (United States) Serena Williams (quarterfinals)
3. (United States) Venus Williams (third round)
4. (Russia) Elena Dementieva (third round)
5. (Serbia) Jelena Janković (fourth round)
6. (Russia) Vera Zvonareva (withdrew because of an ankle injury)
7. (Russia) Svetlana Kuznetsova (champion)
8. (Serbia) Ana Ivanovic (fourth round)
9. (Belarus) Victoria Azarenka (quarterfinals)
10. (Denmark) Caroline Wozniacki (third round)
11. (Russia) Nadia Petrova (second round)
12. (Poland) Agnieszka Radwańska (fourth round)
13. (France) Marion Bartoli (second round)
14. (Italy) Flavia Pennetta (first round)
15. (China) Zheng Jie (second round)
16. (France) Amélie Mauresmo (first round)
17. (Switzerland) Patty Schnyder (first round)
18. (Spain) Anabel Medina Garrigues (second round)
19. (Estonia) Kaia Kanepi (first round)
20. (Slovakia) Dominika Cibulková (semifinals)
21. (France) Alizé Cornet (second round)
22. (Spain) Carla Suárez Navarro (third round)
23. (Russia) Alisa Kleybanova (first round)
24. (Canada) Aleksandra Wozniak (fourth round)
25. (China) Li Na (fourth round)
26. (Russia) Anna Chakvetadze (first round)
27. (Russia) Anastasia Pavlyuchenkova (third round)
28. (Austria) Sybille Bammer (second round)
29. (Hungary) Ágnes Szávay (fourth round)
30. (Australia) Samantha Stosur (semifinals)
31. (China) Peng Shuai (first round)
32. (Czech Republic) Iveta Benešová (third round)

== Draw ==
Key

- Q = Qualifier
- WC = Wild card
- LL = Lucky loser
- Alt = Alternate
- ITF = ITF entry
- PR = Protected ranking
- SR = Special ranking
- SE = Special exempt
- JE = Junior exempt
- JR = Junior Accelerator Programme entrant
- CO = College Accelerator Programme entrant
- NG = Next Gen Accelerator Program entrant
- w/o = Walkover
- r = Retired
- d = Defaulted

=== Finals ===
Quarterfinals
1	(Russia) Dinara Safina	1	6	6
9	(Belarus) Victoria Azarenka	6	4	2
20	(Slovakia) Dominika Cibulková	6	6
(Russia) Maria Sharapova	0	2
(Romania) Sorana Cîrstea	1	3
30	(Australia) Samantha Stosur	6	6
7	(Russia) Svetlana Kuznetsova	7^{7}	5	7
2	(United States) Serena Williams	6^{3}	7	5

Semifinals
1	(Russia) Dinara Safina	6	6
20	(Slovakia) Dominika Cibulková	3	3
30	(Australia) Samantha Stosur	4	7^{7}	3
7	(Russia) Svetlana Kuznetsova	6	6^{5}	6

Final
1	(Russia) Dinara Safina	4	2
7	(Russia) Svetlana Kuznetsova	6	6

=== Top half ===
==== Section 1 ====
First round
1	(Russia) D Safina	6	6
(United Kingdom) A Keothavong	0	0
Q	(Russia) V Diatchenko	2	6	10
(France) M Johansson	6	2	8
(Spain) N Llagostera Vives	5	2
(France) J Coin	7	6
(Romania) IR Olaru	3	2
27	(Russia) A Pavlyuchenkova	6	6
23	(Russia) A Kleybanova	2	6	1
Q	(Slovenia) P Hercog	6	4	6
(Japan) A Sugiyama	3	2
(France) A Rezaï	6	6
Q	(Portugal) M Larcher de Brito	0	7^{7}	7
(United Kingdom) M South	6	6^{5}	5
(France) S Cohen-Aloro	1	3
15	(China) J Zheng	6	6

Second round
1	(Russia) D Safina	6	6
Q	(Russia) V Diatchenko	1	1
(France) J Coin	2	6^{2}
27	(Russia) A Pavlyuchenkova	6	7^{7}
Q	(Slovenia) P Hercog	6	4	2
(France) A Rezaï	3	6	6
Q	(Portugal) M Larcher de Brito	6	6
15	(China) J Zheng	4	3

Third round
1	(Russia) D Safina	6	6
27	(Russia) A Pavlyuchenkova	2	0
(France) A Rezaï	7^{7}	6
Q	(Portugal) M Larcher de Brito	6^{3}	2

Fourth round
1	(Russia) D Safina	6	6
(France) A Rezaï	1	0

==== Section 2 ====
First round
9	(Belarus) V Azarenka	6	6
(Italy) R Vinci	4	2
PR	(Argentina) ME Salerni	6	1	2
(Germany) K Barrois	3	6	6
Q	(Austria) Y Meusburger	1	2
(Czech Republic) L Hradecká	6	6
(Romania) E Gallovits	1	4
22	(Spain) C Suárez Navarro	6	6
32	(Czech Republic) I Benešová	7	4
(Germany) J Görges	5	1^{r}
(United States) V Lepchenko	3	3
(Russia) A Kudryavtseva	6	6
(Thailand) T Tanasugarn	6	5	7
(France) C Pin	3	7	5
(Italy) S Errani	6^{3}	3
8	(Serbia) A Ivanovic	7^{7}	6

Second round
9	(Belarus) V Azarenka	7^{7}	7
(Germany) K Barrois	6^{1}	5
(Czech Republic) L Hradecká	2	4
22	(Spain) C Suárez Navarro	6	6
32	(Czech Republic) I Benešová	6	6
(Russia) A Kudryavtseva	1	2
(Thailand) T Tanasugarn	1	2
8	(Serbia) A Ivanovic	6	6

Third round
9	(Belarus) V Azarenka	5	7	6
22	(Spain) C Suárez Navarro	7	5	2
32	(Czech Republic) I Benešová	0	2
8	(Serbia) A Ivanovic	6	6

Fourth round
9	(Belarus) V Azarenka	6	6
8	(Serbia) A Ivanovic	2	3

==== Section 3 ====
First round
3	(United States) V Williams	6	4	6
(United States) B Mattek-Sands	1	6	2
(Czech Republic) L Šafářová	6	1	6
(Germany) S Lisicki	2	6	1
(Russia) E Vesnina	6	6
(France) S Brémond Beltrame	3	3
Q	(Italy) C Dentoni	3	4
29	(Hungary) Á Szávay	6	6
20	(Slovakia) D Cibulková	6	2	6
(Ukraine) A Bondarenko	4	6	4
(France) S Foretz	1	6	4
(Belgium) K Flipkens	6	4	6
(Austria) T Paszek	1	3
(Argentina) G Dulko	6	6
(Germany) A-L Grönefeld	6	6
16	(France) A Mauresmo	4	3

Second round
3	(United States) V Williams	6^{5}	6	7
(Czech Republic) L Šafářová	7^{7}	2	5
(Russia) E Vesnina	2	0
29	(Hungary) Á Szávay	6	6
20	(Slovakia) D Cibulková	6	6
(Belgium) K Flipkens	1	0
(Argentina) G Dulko	7^{7}	0	6
(Germany) A-L Grönefeld	6^{5}	6	2

Third round
3	(United States) V Williams	0	4
29	(Hungary) Á Szávay	6	6
20	(Slovakia) D Cibulková	6	6
(Argentina) G Dulko	4	2

Fourth round
29	(Hungary) Á Szávay	2	4
20	(Slovakia) D Cibulková	6	6

==== Section 4 ====
First round
11	(Russia) N Petrova	6	6
WC	(United States) L Embree	1	2
(Belarus) A Yakimova	6	1	2
(Russia) M Sharapova	3	6	6
WC	(France) O Sanchez	1	1
Q	(Netherlands) A Rus	6	6
Q	(Kazakhstan) Y Shvedova	7^{7}	3	6
19	(Estonia) K Kanepi	6^{2}	6	2
25	(China) N Li	6	6
(Poland) M Domachowska	4	2
WC	(France) É Loit	6	4	1
(Switzerland) T Bacsinszky	4	6	6
WC	(France) I Pavlovic	3	4
(Uzbekistan) A Amanmuradova	6	6
(Belarus) O Govortsova	6	6
LL	(United Kingdom) K O'Brien	1	1

Second round
11	(Russia) N Petrova	2	6	6
(Russia) M Sharapova	6	1	8
Q	(Netherlands) A Rus	0	2
Q	(Kazakhstan) Y Shvedova	6	6
25	(China) N Li	6	6
(Switzerland) T Bacsinszky	1	4
(Uzbekistan) A Amanmuradova	3	7^{7}	5
(Belarus) O Govortsova	6	6^{3}	7

Third round
(Russia) M Sharapova	1	6	6
Q	(Kazakhstan) Y Shvedova	6	3	4
25	(China) N Li	7	6
(Belarus) O Govortsova	5	1

Fourth round
(Russia) M Sharapova	6	0	6
25	(China) N Li	4	6	4

=== Bottom half ===
==== Section 5 ====
First round
5	(Serbia) J Janković	6	6
(Czech Republic) P Cetkovská	2	3
(Slovakia) M Rybáriková	6	2	8
WC	(France) K Mladenovic	1	6	6
(Australia) J Groth	6	6
WC	(France) K Laisné	4	3
LL	(Colombia) M Duque Mariño	3	6	6
26	(Russia) A Chakvetadze	6	4	4
21	(France) A Cornet	6	7
(Estonia) M Ani	4	5
Q	(United States) C Gullickson	4	2
(Romania) S Cîrstea	6	6
(Bulgaria) T Pironkova	5	2
(United States) J Craybas	7	6
(Russia) V Dushevina	6	5	1
10	(Denmark) C Wozniacki	4	7	6

Second round
5	(Serbia) J Janković	6	6
(Slovakia) M Rybáriková	1	2
(Australia) J Groth	6	7^{11}
LL	(Colombia) M Duque Mariño	2	6^{9}
21	(France) A Cornet	3	2
(Romania) S Cîrstea	6	6
(United States) J Craybas	1	4
10	(Denmark) C Wozniacki	6	6

Third round
5	(Serbia) J Janković	6	6
(Australia) J Groth	1	1
(Romania) S Cîrstea	7^{7}	7
10	(Denmark) C Wozniacki	6^{3}	5

Fourth round
5	(Serbia) J Janković	6	0	7
(Romania) S Cîrstea	3	6	9

==== Section 6 ====
First round
13	(France) M Bartoli	3	6	6
(France) P Parmentier	6	1	3
(Italy) T Garbin	7	7
(Japan) A Morita	5	5
(France) V Razzano	6	6
(Slovakia) D Hantuchová	3	3
(Russia) E Makarova	2	7	0
18	(Spain) A Medina Garrigues	6	5	6
30	(Australia) S Stosur	6	6
(Italy) F Schiavone	4	2
(Belgium) Y Wickmayer	4	6	6
(Poland) U Radwańska	6	3	0
(Australia) J Dokić	3	6	6
(Croatia) K Šprem	6	1	2
Q	(South Africa) C Scheepers	4	3
4	(Russia) E Dementieva	6	6

Second round
13	(France) M Bartoli	3	5
(Italy) T Garbin	6	7
(France) V Razzano	6	6
18	(Spain) A Medina Garrigues	2	2
30	(Australia) S Stosur	6	4	6
(Belgium) Y Wickmayer	3	6	4
(Australia) J Dokić	6	3	r
4	(Russia) E Dementieva	2	4

Third round
(Italy) T Garbin	5	5
(France) V Razzano	7	7
30	(Australia) S Stosur	6	4	6
4	(Russia) E Dementieva	3	6	1

Fourth round
(France) V Razzano	1	2
30	(Australia) S Stosur	6	6

==== Section 7 ====
First round
7	(Russia) S Kuznetsova	6	6
WC	(France) C Feuerstein	1	4
(Kazakhstan) G Voskoboeva	6	7^{7}
(India) S Mirza	4	6^{3}
Q	(Latvia) A Sevastova	6	4	1
(Hungary) M Czink	3	6	6
(France) N Dechy	3	6^{1}
28	(Austria) S Bammer	6	7^{7}
17	(Switzerland) P Schnyder	4	3
(Ukraine) K Bondarenko	6	6
WC	(Australia) O Rogowska	6	6
(Russia) M Kirilenko	4	4
(Austria) P Mayr	1	1
(Ukraine) M Koryttseva	6	6
(Paraguay) R de los Ríos	3	1
12	(Poland) A Radwańska	6	6

Second round
7	(Russia) S Kuznetsova	6	6
(Kazakhstan) G Voskoboeva	0	2
(Hungary) M Czink	4	6	10
28	(Austria) S Bammer	6	3	8
(Ukraine) K Bondarenko	4	7	7
WC	(Australia) O Rogowska	6	5	5
(Ukraine) M Koryttseva	1	4
12	(Poland) A Radwańska	6	6

Third round
7	(Russia) S Kuznetsova	6	6
(Hungary) M Czink	1	3
(Ukraine) K Bondarenko	2	4
12	(Poland) A Radwańska	6	6

Fourth round
7	(Russia) S Kuznetsova	6	1	6
12	(Poland) A Radwańska	4	6	1

==== Section 8 ====
First round
14	(Italy) F Pennetta	1	1
(United States) A Glatch	6	6
(Czech Republic) B Záhlavová-Strýcová	1	6	7
(Spain) L Domínguez Lino	6	4	9
(Italy) M Santangelo	4	2
Q	(Croatia) P Martić	6	6
(Romania) M Niculescu	4	6	3
24	(Canada) A Wozniak	6	4	6
31	(China) S Peng	6	2	4
(Spain) MJ Martínez Sánchez	1	6	6
(Ukraine) V Kutuzova	6	6
Q	(Czech Republic) Z Ondrášková	2	4
(Spain) V Ruano Pascual	6	6
(Czech Republic) N Vaidišová	4	3
(Czech Republic) K Zakopalová	3	7^{7}	4
2	(United States) S Williams	6	6^{5}	6

Second round
(United States) A Glatch	6^{0}	5
(Spain) L Domínguez Lino	7^{7}	7
Q	(Croatia) P Martić	3	3
24	(Canada) A Wozniak	6	6
(Spain) MJ Martínez Sánchez	3	6	6
(Ukraine) V Kutuzova	6	3	3
(Spain) V Ruano Pascual	2	0
2	(United States) S Williams	6	6

Third round
(Spain) L Domínguez Lino	2	6	3
24	(Canada) A Wozniak	6	3	6
(Spain) MJ Martínez Sánchez	6	3	4
2	(United States) S Williams	4	6	6

Fourth round
24	(Canada) A Wozniak	1	2
2	(United States) S Williams	6	6

== Championship match statistics ==
Category	(Russia) Kuznetsova	(Russia) Safina
1st serve %	42/54 (78%)	30/49 (61%)
1st serve points won	28 of 42 = 67%	16 of 30 = 53%
2nd serve points won	4 of 12 = 33%	6 of 19 = 32%
Total service points won	32 of 54 = 59.26%	22 of 49 = 44.90%
Aces	0	0
Double faults	1	7
Winners	12	11
Unforced errors	22	22
Net points won	4 of 4 = 100%	2 of 2 = 100%
Break points converted	5 of 7 = 71%	2 of 4 = 50%
Return points won	27 of 49 = 55%	22 of 54 = 41%
Total points won	59	44

Preceded by 2009 Australian Open – Women's singles	Grand Slam women's singles	Succeeded by 2009 Wimbledon Championships – Women's singles
