= Stéphanie Vongsouthi =

French tennis player

- Country (sports): France
- Born: 15 September 1988 (age 36)
- Plays: Right-handed (two-handed backhand)
- Prize money: $82,523

Singles
- Career record: 178–157
- Career titles: 2 ITF
- Highest ranking: No. 233 (9 November 2009)

Doubles
- Career record: 20–40
- Career titles: 1 ITF
- Highest ranking: No. 323 (22 March 2010)

Stéphanie Vongsouthi (born 15 September 1988) is a French former tennis player.

== Tennis career ==
=== 2005 ===
Vongsouthi played her first ever professional match on clay at Amiens in France, at the age of 16. She lost a close match to compatriot Laurene Fayol, 7–5, 5–7, 4–6, and left the tournament with her first prize money of $98. Vongsouthi's first victory came four months later at Zwevegem in Belgium. She defeated home favorite Davinia Lobbinger in straight sets, and went on to lose a tight match in the second round to Gabriela Velasco Andreu, the world No. 380. Vongsouthi played three more tournaments that year but did not advance past the second round in any of them. She ended the year ranked 1090 with a singles record of 3–6.

=== 2006 ===
Vongsouthi started her year in Belfort, France, where she lost in the qualifying rounds. Next, she returned to Amiens where she won her first-round match against Tessy van de Ven, 6–3, 6–1. However, she lost in the next round to fourth seed Gaëlle Widmer of Switzerland. She then lost in the first round of three more tournaments, all in France, including Strasbourg where she faced her highest ever ranked opponent, Virginie Pichet, ranked No. 203.

In June, Vongsouthi headed to Montpellier, where she experienced a breakthrough, beating through seed including Émilie Bacquet and Eva Fernández Brugués to reach her first ever ITF Women's Circuit final. However, Vongsouthi was unable to overcome Olivia Sanchez, ranked 469th, and after an impressive first set, Vongsouthi let the match run away from her, 7–6, 0–6, 0–6. Her results improved from then on with a quarterfinal appearance in Brussels and a semifinal in Rebecq.

She entered Enschede in the Netherlands as the No. 6 seed. Ranked 646 by the Women's Tennis Association (WTA), this was the first time Vongsouthi had been seeded in a professional tournament. She struggled through her first-round match against Olivia Scarfi, 6–3, 6–7, 6–0, before flying through the next three rounds to reach the final. Her second final of the year ended in the same way as the first, losing to Marlot Meddens in straight sets.

Vongsouthi ended the year ranked 577 with a singles record of 21–15.

=== 2007 ===
Vongsouthi began the year with a quarterfinal appearance in Sunderland. From here on however she failed to get past the second round in three consecutive tournaments. She headed to Amiens for the third time in her career. Ranked 501 in the world, she was seeded third and breezed through her first round. However the next two rounds proved considerably more difficult, each time pushing Vongsouthi to three setters, all the same she managed to pull through to reach the semifinals. Here she came against Audrey Bergot a French player ranked far below her. However, Bergot played some brilliant tennis to overcome Vongsouthi in a long three-set match. Three more tournaments passed without Vongsouthi getting past the second round.

On 29 April, Vongsouthi headed to Naples where she blasted through her first three rounds without dropping a set. She struggled a little bit more in the semifinal against Patricia Mayr but managed to pull through 2–6, 6–4, 7–6 to make it to her third ever ITF Circuit final. However just as before nerves seemed to get to Vongsouthi as she faced seventh seed Michelle Gerards, she lost 2–6, 1–6. In Braga, Portugal, Vongsouthi once more managed to make it to the final as the second seed. She didn't drop a set on the way to the final. However, she came up against the top seed and home favourite, Neuza Silva, Vongsouthi fell once more 1–6, 4–6.

She then went to the French Open where she received a wildcard into the qualifying draw. This was her first ever match at a Grand Slam championship and she lost to 13th seed Hsieh Su-wei who was ranked 300 places above her. She played six tournaments after this, again not making it past the second round in any of them. She re-entered Rebecq, this time as the No. 1 seed, the first time she had ever been seeded first in a tournament. Unfortunately, she seemed to struggle through her first three matches against far less experienced players and lost in the semifinals to Samantha Schoeffel 2–6, 1–6. She played nine more tournaments in the year but didn't manage to make it to any quarterfinals.

She ended 2007 ranked 480 with a singles record of 39–30.

=== 2008 ===
She began her year at Sunderland once more, she reached the quarterfinals again, before losing to Elena Kulikova of Russia, 3–6, 7–6, 1–6. She didn't achieve any impressive results until she headed to Bath in March. Ranked 498 and the No. 7 seed, Vongsouthi blasted through the first four rounds without dropping a set to reach her fifth final. Facing off against Sarah Borwell of Great Britain, ranked 296 and the top seed in Bath, Vongsouthi looked visibly nervous. Her final curse seemed to play out once more as she lost 4–6, 6–7, giving her a finals record of 0–5.

She headed to Torrent, Spain, in April, where she managed to make it to the semifinals. After taking a few weeks out Vongsouthi returned to play in Bucharest as the third seed. She reached her sixth ever final and the second of 2008, where she was set to face, Simona Halep of Romania. Vongsouthi failed once more, even though she was ranked higher and lost the match 6–7, 3–6. Her finals record was now set at 0–6.

She played as a wildcard in the French Open qualifying draw and lost once again, this time to Margit Rüütel of Estonia. Vongsouthi mainly played tournaments in France for a few months, with quarterfinal appearances at Montpellier and Périgueux and a semifinal appearance in Mont-de-Marsan.

On 19 October, Vongsouthi headed to Lisbon as the top seed. Ranked at 379, she had a huge advantage over her opponents, and defeated Nicola Geuer in the final for her first ever title. She didn't drop a set during the whole tournament.

She ended 2008 ranked 353 with a singles record of 46–27.

=== 2009 ===
She began her year in Glasgow, and ranked at 330 she was the top seed. She raced through her first few rounds defeating Jade Curtis, Irini Georgatou and Stefania Boffa. She reached the final without dropping a set. She faced third seed Emma Laine of Finland in the final. Despite taking the first set, Vongsouthi couldn't close out the match, losing in the tiebreak. Her final record dropped to 1–7. Vongsouthi's success of Great Britain continued when she returned to Bath, a finalist the year before she was ranked even higher at 314 and looked prepared to win. She didn't drop a set the whole tournament, knocking out Naomi Broady in the semifinal and Verdiana Verardi in the final.

Since Vongsouthi has failed to pass the second round of any of the seven tournaments, she has not played since then.

Having received a wildcard into the qualifying of the 2009 French Open, she defeated fellow wildcard Aurélie Védy in the first round, before losing to British 15th seed, Elena Baltacha, in the next.

== ITF finals ==
Legend
$25,000 tournaments
$10,000 tournaments

=== Singles (2–7) ===
Result	No.	Date	Tournament	Surface	Opponent	Score
Loss	1.	19 June 2006	Montpellier, France	Clay	(France) Olivia Sanchez	7–6^{(6)}, 0–6, 0–6
Loss	2.	4 September 2006	Enschede, Netherlands	Clay	(Netherlands) Marlot Meddens	2–6, 3–6
Loss	3.	23 April 2007	Naples, Italy	Clay	(Netherlands) Michelle Gerards	2–6, 1–6
Loss	4.	28 May 2007	Braga, Portugal	Clay	(Portugal) Neuza Silva	1–6, 4–6
Loss	5.	17 March 2008	Bath, United Kingdom	Hard	(United Kingdom) Sarah Borwell	4–6, 6–7^{(5)}
Loss	6.	12 May 2008	Bucharest, Romania	Clay	(Romania) Simona Halep	6–7^{(4)}, 3–6
Win	7.	28 October 2008	Lisbon, Portugal	Hard	(Germany) Nicola Geuer	6–3, 6–4
Loss	8.	12 January 2009	Glasgow, United Kingdom	Hard	(Finland) Emma Laine	6–4, 2–6, 6–7^{(2)}
Win	9.	28 March 2009	Bath, United Kingdom	Hard	(Italy) Verdiana Verardi	6–2, 6–4

=== Doubles (1–2) ===
Result	No.	Date	Tournament	Surface	Partner	Opponents	Score
Win	1.	4 May 2009	Florence, Italy	Clay	(France) Kinnie Laisné	(Slovakia) Klaudia Boczová (Italy) Nicole Clerico	6–0, 6–1
Loss	2.	1 March 2010	Lyon, France	Hard	(Romania) Elena Bogdan	(Poland) Olga Brózda (Poland) Magdalena Kiszczyńska	7–5, 4–6, [6–10]
Loss	3.	31 July 2010	Gardone Val Trompia, Italy	Clay	(Bulgaria) Julia Stamatova	(Italy) Gioia Barbieri (Italy) Anastasia Grymalska	2–6, 2–6
