= Kinnie Laisné =

French tennis player (born 1989)

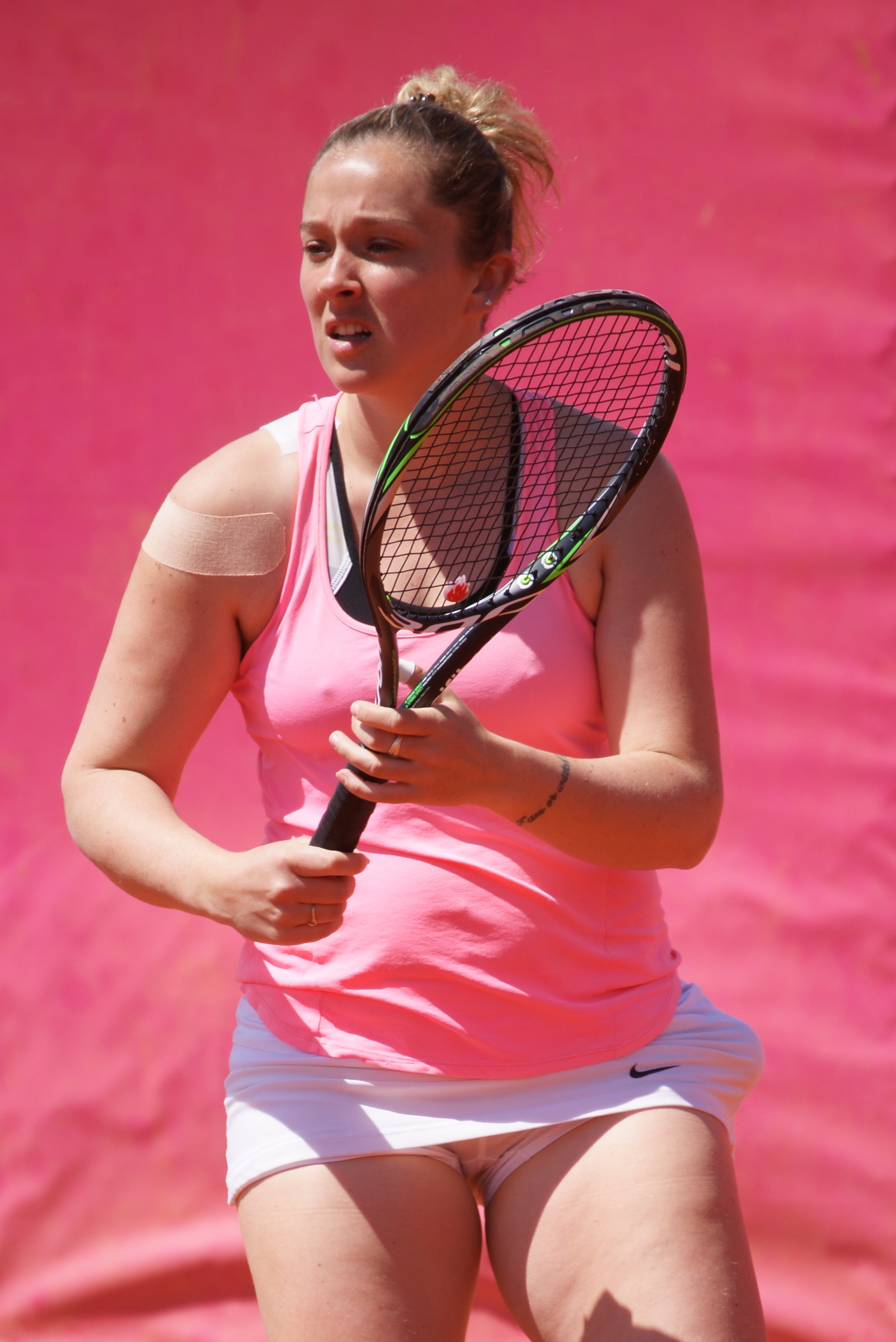
- Laisné, 2016 at Cagnes-sur-Mer
- Country (sports): France
- Born: 11 July 1989 (age 35); Cherbourg
- Height: 1.69 m (5 ft 6 1/2 in)
- Plays: Right (two-handed backhand)
- Prize money: $81,237

Singles
- Career record: 123–124
- Career titles: 1 ITF
- Highest ranking: No. 295 (17 August 2009)

Grand Slam singles results
- French Open: 1R (2009)

Doubles
- Career record: 34–37
- Career titles: 3 ITF
- Highest ranking: No. 381 (21 December 2009)

Grand Slam doubles results
- French Open: 1R (2009)

Kinnie Laisné (born 11 July 1989) is a French former tennis player.

Laisné has a career-high singles ranking by the Women's Tennis Association (WTA) of 295, achieved on 17 August 2009. She also has a career-high WTA doubles ranking of 381, reached on 21 December 2009. Laisné won one singles title and three doubles titles on the ITF Women's Circuit.

She made her WTA Tour main-draw debut at the 2008 Tashkent Open in the doubles tournament, partnering with Katie O'Brien.

== ITF finals ==
=== Singles (1–2) ===
Legend
$75,000 tournaments
$50,000 tournaments
$25,000 tournaments
$15,000 tournaments
$10,000 tournaments

Result	No.	Date	Tournament	Surface	Opponent	Score
Loss	1.	Sep 2008	ITF Denain, France	Clay	(Germany) Kristina Barrois	2–6, 4–6
Loss	2.	Nov 2009	ITF Vila Real de Santo António, Portugal	Clay	(France) Natalie Piquion	3–6, 5–7
Win	1.	Apr 2015	ITF Dakar, Senegal	Hard	(France) Clothilde de Bernardi	6–3, 0–6, 6–4

=== Doubles (3–3) ===
Legend
$50,000 tournaments
$25,000 tournaments
$10,000 tournaments

Result	No.	Date	Tournament	Surface	Partner	Opponents	Score
Win	1.	8 May 2009	ITF Florence, Italy	Clay	(France) Stéphanie Vongsouthi	(Slovakia) Klaudia Boczová (Italy) Nicole Clerico	6–0, 6–1
Win	2.	31 October 2009	ITF Vila Real de Santo António, Portugal	Clay	(Netherlands) Claire Lablans	(Russia) Inna Sokolova (Russia) Yaroslava Zhishchenko	6–4, 7–6^{(4)}
Loss	1.	20 November 2009	ITF Équeurdreville, France	Hard (i)	(Bulgaria) Elitsa Kostova	(France) Elixane Lechemia (France) Constance Sibille	4–6, 3–6
Loss	2.	30 March 2012	ITF Le Havre, France	Clay (i)	(France) Manon Arcangioli	(France) Myrtille Georges (France) Céline Ghesquière	4–6, 2–6
Win	3.	21 February 2014	ITF Mâcon, France	Hard (i)	(France) Audrey Albie	(Italy) Federica di Sarra (Italy) Camilla Rosatello	6–3, 2–6, [10–8]
Loss	3.	27 February 2015	ITF Mâcon, France	Hard (i)	(France) Marine Partaud	(Bulgaria) Isabella Shinikova (Netherlands) Eva Wacanno	4–6, 6–3, [5–10]
