= 2005 French Open – Women's singles qualifying =

Women's singles qualifying
- 2005 French Open

Events
Singles	men	women		boys	girls
Doubles	men	women	mixed	boys	girls
WC Singles	men	women	quad
WC Doubles	men	women	quad
Legends	−45	45+	women

Qualification
Singles	men	women
- French Open

This article displays the qualifying draw for the Women's Singles at the 2005 French Open.

== Seeds ==
1. (Czech Republic) Zuzana Ondrášková (first round)
2. (Venezuela) Milagros Sequera (first round)
3. (Spain) Laura Pous Tió (second round)
4. (Czech Republic) Lucie Šafářová (qualifying competition, lucky loser)
5. (Tunisia) Selima Sfar (second round)
6. (Netherlands) Michaëlla Krajicek (qualified)
7. (United States) Lindsay Lee-Waters (qualifying competition)
8. (Russia) Ekaterina Bychkova (first round)
9. (Romania) Edina Gallovits (second round)
10. (United Kingdom) Elena Baltacha (first round)
11. (Spain) Lourdes Domínguez Lino (qualifying competition)
12. (Canada) Marie-Ève Pelletier (first round)
13. (Israel) Tzipora Obziler (first round)
14. (United States) Chanda Rubin (first round)
15. (United States) Jamea Jackson (first round)
16. (Slovakia) Ľubomíra Kurhajcová (first round)
17. (Russia) Galina Voskoboeva (qualifying competition)
18. (Czech Republic) Sandra Kleinová (first round)
19. (Belarus) Anastasiya Yakimova (qualified)
20. (Italy) Mara Santangelo (qualified)
21. (India) Shikha Uberoi (first round)
22. (Czech Republic) Eva Birnerová (qualified)
23. (Japan) Saori Obata (first round)
24. (Austria) Yvonne Meusburger (qualified)

== Qualifiers ==
1. (United States) Meilen Tu
2. (Sweden) Sofia Arvidsson
3. (Argentina) Clarisa Fernández
4. (Germany) Sandra Klösel
5. (Hungary) Petra Mandula
6. (Netherlands) Michaëlla Krajicek
7. (Czech Republic) Eva Birnerová
8. (Austria) Yvonne Meusburger
9. (Bosnia and Herzegovina) Mervana Jugić-Salkić
10. (Czech Republic) Libuše Prušová
11. (Belarus) Anastasiya Yakimova
12. (Italy) Mara Santangelo

== Qualifying draw ==
Key

- Q = Qualifier
- WC = Wild card
- LL = Lucky loser
- Alt = Alternate
- ITF = ITF entry
- PR = Protected ranking
- SR = Special ranking
- SE = Special exempt
- JE = Junior exempt
- JR = Junior Accelerator Programme entrant
- CO = College Accelerator Programme entrant
- NG = Next Gen Accelerator Program entrant
- w/o = Walkover
- r = Retired
- d = Defaulted

=== First qualifier ===
First round
1	(Czech Republic) Zuzana Ondrášková	6	4	2
(Spain) Conchita Martínez Granados	4	6	6
(United States) Meilen Tu	6	6
(Morocco) Bahia Mouhtassine	3	4
(France) Virginie Pichet	6	0	4
(Slovakia) Stanislava Hrozenská	3	6	6
(Brazil) Maria-Fernanda Alves	4	6	6
23	(Japan) Saori Obata	6	2	3

Second round
(Spain) Conchita Martínez Granados	1	3
(United States) Meilen Tu	6	6
(Slovakia) Stanislava Hrozenská	6^{6}	1
(Brazil) Maria-Fernanda Alves	7^{8}	6

Qualifying competition
(United States) Meilen Tu	6	6
(Brazil) Maria-Fernanda Alves	3	1

=== Second qualifier ===
First round
2	(Venezuela) Milagros Sequera	4	6	4
(Italy) Adriana Serra Zanetti	6	4	6
(Japan) Shiho Hisamatsu	1	6	0
(China) Sun Tiantian	6	4	6
(Hungary) Virág Németh	1	1
(Sweden) Sofia Arvidsson	6	6
(Slovakia) Jarmila Gajdošová	7^{7}	6
21	(India) Shikha Uberoi	6^{4}	3

Second round
(Italy) Adriana Serra Zanetti	0	2
(China) Sun Tiantian	6	6
(Sweden) Sofia Arvidsson	7^{7}	6
(Slovakia) Jarmila Gajdošová	6^{2}	1

Qualifying competition
(China) Sun Tiantian	4	1
(Sweden) Sofia Arvidsson	6	6

=== Third qualifier ===
First round
3	(Spain) Laura Pous Tió	6	6
WC	(France) Violette Huck	0	4
(Croatia) Nika Ožegović	6^{2}	3
(Argentina) Clarisa Fernández	7^{7}	6
(Finland) Emma Laine	6	6
(Portugal) Frederica Piedade	3	1
WC	(United States) Mary Gambale	6	3	6
15	(United States) Jamea Jackson	3	6	4

Second round
3	(Spain) Laura Pous Tió	6	5	8
(Argentina) Clarisa Fernández	1	7	10
(Finland) Emma Laine	6	6
WC	(United States) Mary Gambale	2	2

Qualifying competition
(Argentina) Clarisa Fernández	6^{4}	7^{7}	6
(Finland) Emma Laine	7^{7}	6^{5}	1

=== Fourth qualifier ===
First round
4	(Czech Republic) Lucie Šafářová	6	6
(Japan) Yuka Yoshida	1	1
(Czech Republic) Eva Hrdinová	1	0
(Hungary) Anikó Kapros	6	6
WC	(France) Irena Pavlovic	4	6	6
(United States) Jessica Kirkland	6	3	4
(Germany) Sandra Klösel	6	6
18	(Czech Republic) Sandra Kleinová	3	2

Second round
4	(Czech Republic) Lucie Šafářová	6	6
(Hungary) Anikó Kapros	3	2
WC	(France) Irena Pavlovic	2	4
(Germany) Sandra Klösel	6	6

Qualifying competition
4	(Czech Republic) Lucie Šafářová	6	4	3
(Germany) Sandra Klösel	2	6	6

=== Fifth qualifier ===
First round
5	(Tunisia) Selima Sfar	6	6
(Hungary) Rita Kuti-Kis	1	4
(Belgium) Els Callens	6	6
(Estonia) Maret Ani	1	1
(Germany) Sabine Klaschka	6	6
(Russia) Anastasia Rodionova	3	3
(Hungary) Petra Mandula	6	6
16	(Slovakia) Ľubomíra Kurhajcová	4	1

Second round
5	(Tunisia) Selima Sfar	4	6	4
(Belgium) Els Callens	6	4	6
(Germany) Sabine Klaschka	3	2
(Hungary) Petra Mandula	6	6

Qualifying competition
(Belgium) Els Callens	3	6^{2}
(Hungary) Petra Mandula	6	7^{7}

=== Sixth qualifier ===
First round
6	(Netherlands) Michaëlla Krajicek	6	6
(Argentina) María Emilia Salerni	2	3
(Germany) Vanessa Henke	6	6
(Spain) Paula García	1	2
(Ukraine) Olga Lazarchuk	2	0
(Slovakia) Henrieta Nagyová	6	6
(United States) Bethanie Mattek	2	6	6
14	(United States) Chanda Rubin	6	3	1

Second round
6	(Netherlands) Michaëlla Krajicek	6	6
(Germany) Vanessa Henke	1	4
(Slovakia) Henrieta Nagyová	7	6
(United States) Bethanie Mattek	5	2

Qualifying competition
6	(Netherlands) Michaëlla Krajicek	7	6
(Slovakia) Henrieta Nagyová	5	3

=== Seventh qualifier ===
First round
7	(United States) Lindsay Lee-Waters	6	6
WC	(France) Kildine Chevalier	4	3
(Germany) Kathrin Wörle	3	6	6
(China) Li Ting	6	4	2
WC	(France) Florence Haring	0	4
(Hungary) Zsófia Gubacsi	6	6
WC	(France) Pascale Leroy	1	3
22	(Czech Republic) Eva Birnerová	6	6

Second round
7	(United States) Lindsay Lee-Waters	6	6
(Germany) Kathrin Wörle	4	1
(Hungary) Zsófia Gubacsi	6	0	5
22	(Czech Republic) Eva Birnerová	4	6	7

Qualifying competition
7	(United States) Lindsay Lee-Waters	2	6^{2}
22	(Czech Republic) Eva Birnerová	6	7^{7}

=== Eighth qualifier ===
First round
8	(Russia) Ekaterina Bychkova	3	4
(Italy) Alice Canepa	6	6
(Belgium) Kirsten Flipkens	1	6	5
(Italy) Nathalie Viérin	6	3	7
(China) Liu Nannan	4	1
(Germany) Martina Müller	6	6
(Zimbabwe) Cara Black	0	6	3
24	(Austria) Yvonne Meusburger	6	3	6

Second round
(Italy) Alice Canepa	6	6
(Italy) Nathalie Viérin	2	0
(Germany) Martina Müller	4	4
24	(Austria) Yvonne Meusburger	6	6

Qualifying competition
(Italy) Alice Canepa	6	2	5
24	(Austria) Yvonne Meusburger	3	6	7

=== Ninth qualifier ===
First round
9	(Romania) Edina Gallovits	6	6
(Germany) Anca Barna	2	2
(Austria) Sybille Bammer	7	5	3
(Bosnia and Herzegovina) Mervana Jugić-Salkić	5	7	6
(United States) Teryn Ashley	4	6	6
(Canada) Maureen Drake	6	4	1
(South Korea) Jeon Mi-ra	1	1
17	(Russia) Galina Voskoboeva	6	6

Second round
9	(Romania) Edina Gallovits	6^{11}	2
(Bosnia and Herzegovina) Mervana Jugić-Salkić	7^{13}	6
(United States) Teryn Ashley	0	3
17	(Russia) Galina Voskoboeva	6	6

Qualifying competition
(Bosnia and Herzegovina) Mervana Jugić-Salkić	3	6	6
17	(Russia) Galina Voskoboeva	6	4	2

=== Tenth qualifier ===
First round
10	(United Kingdom) Elena Baltacha	7	2	1
(Netherlands) Elise Tamaëla	5	6	6
(Romania) Delia Sescioreanu	3	3
(Sweden) Hanna Nooni	6	6
(Puerto Rico) Vilmarie Castellvi	3	4
PR	(Czech Republic) Renata Voráčová	6	6
(Czech Republic) Libuše Prušová	3	6	7
13	(Israel) Tzipora Obziler	6	2	5

Second round
(Netherlands) Elise Tamaëla	7^{7}	3	6
(Sweden) Hanna Nooni	6^{4}	6	1
PR	(Czech Republic) Renata Voráčová	0	4
(Czech Republic) Libuše Prušová	6	6

Qualifying competition
(Netherlands) Elise Tamaëla	0	0
(Czech Republic) Libuše Prušová	6	6

=== Eleventh qualifier ===
First round
11	(Spain) Lourdes Domínguez Lino	6	6^{9}	6
(Russia) Lioudmila Skavronskaia	1	7^{11}	2
WC	(France) Gracia Radovanovic	2	3
(Ukraine) Yuliya Beygelzimer	6	6
(Slovenia) Tina Pisnik	3	2
(South Africa) Natalie Grandin	6	6
(Czech Republic) Kateřina Böhmová	5	2
19	(Belarus) Anastasiya Yakimova	7	6

Second round
11	(Spain) Lourdes Domínguez Lino	6	6
(Ukraine) Yuliya Beygelzimer	3	2
(South Africa) Natalie Grandin	4	5
19	(Belarus) Anastasiya Yakimova	6	7

Qualifying competition
11	(Spain) Lourdes Domínguez Lino	2	0
19	(Belarus) Anastasiya Yakimova	6	6

=== Twelfth qualifier ===
First round
12	(Canada) Marie-Ève Pelletier	2	3
(Czech Republic) Hana Šromová	6	6
(Czech Republic) Lenka Nemecková	1	6	10
(Canada) Stéphanie Dubois	6	4	8
(South Africa) Chanelle Scheepers	4	4
(United States) Sunitha Rao	6	6
WC	(France) Aurélie Védy	3	6	1
20	(Italy) Mara Santangelo	6	1	6

Second round
(Czech Republic) Hana Šromová	5	6	6
(Czech Republic) Lenka Nemecková	7	0	8
(United States) Sunitha Rao	6	2	3
20	(Italy) Mara Santangelo	3	6	6

Qualifying competition
(Czech Republic) Lenka Nemecková	1	3
20	(Italy) Mara Santangelo	6	6
