= 2005 French Open – Men's singles qualifying =

Men's singles qualifying
- 2005 French Open

Events
Singles	men	women		boys	girls
Doubles	men	women	mixed	boys	girls
WC Singles	men	women	quad
WC Doubles	men	women	quad
Legends	−45	45+	women

Qualification
Singles	men	women
- French Open

This article displays the qualifying draw for the Men's Singles at the 2005 French Open.

== Seeds ==
1. (Italy) Andreas Seppi (second round)
2. (Switzerland) Stan Wawrinka (qualified)
3. (Germany) Tomas Behrend (qualified)
4. (Finland) Jarkko Nieminen (qualified)
5. (Italy) Alessio di Mauro (second round)
6. (Czech Republic) Ivo Minář (first round)
7. (Czech Republic) Bohdan Ulihrach (second round)
8. (France) Antony Dupuis (qualified)
9. (Ecuador) Giovanni Lapentti (first round)
10. (France) Grégory Carraz (second round)
11. (Ecuador) Nicolás Lapentti (first round)
12. (Italy) Francesco Aldi (second round)
13. (France) Nicolas Mahut (first round)
14. (France) Olivier Mutis (first round)
15. (Serbia and Montenegro) Novak Djokovic (qualified)
16. (Italy) Daniele Bracciali (qualifying competition, lucky loser)
17. (United States) James Blake (qualified)
18. (Belgium) Dick Norman (qualifying competition, lucky loser)
19. (Brazil) Flávio Saretta (qualifying competition, lucky loser)
20. (Belgium) Kristof Vliegen (qualified)
21. (Czech Republic) Robin Vik (qualified)
22. (Switzerland) Ivo Heuberger (second round)
23. (Sweden) Michael Ryderstedt (first round)
24. (Spain) Rubén Ramírez Hidalgo (first round)
25. (Slovakia) Michal Mertiňák (first round)
26. (Switzerland) George Bastl (second round)
27. (Argentina) Juan Pablo Brzezicki (qualifying competition, lucky loser)
28. (United States) Hugo Armando (qualifying competition, lucky loser)
29. (Italy) Tomas Tenconi (qualified)
30. (United States) Alex Bogomolov Jr. (first round)
31. (United States) Amer Delić (first round)
32. (Israel) Noam Okun (qualifying competition)

== Qualifiers ==
1. (Croatia) Saša Tuksar
2. (Switzerland) Stan Wawrinka
3. (Germany) Tomas Behrend
4. (Finland) Jarkko Nieminen
5. (Czech Republic) Lukáš Dlouhý
6. (Spain) Daniel Gimeno-Traver
7. (Spain) Fernando Vicente
8. (France) Antony Dupuis
9. (Czech Republic) Robin Vik
10. (Brazil) Marcos Daniel
11. (Israel) Dudi Sela
12. (Italy) Tomas Tenconi
13. (United States) James Blake
14. (Australia) Chris Guccione
15. (Serbia and Montenegro) Novak Djokovic
16. (Belgium) Kristof Vliegen

== Lucky losers ==
1. (Italy) Daniele Bracciali
2. (Belgium) Dick Norman
3. (Brazil) Flávio Saretta
4. (Argentina) Juan Pablo Brzezicki
5. (United States) Hugo Armando

== Qualifying draw ==
Key

- Q = Qualifier
- WC = Wild card
- LL = Lucky loser
- Alt = Alternate
- ITF = ITF entry
- PR = Protected ranking
- SR = Special ranking
- SE = Special exempt
- JE = Junior exempt
- JR = Junior Accelerator Programme entrant
- CO = College Accelerator Programme entrant
- NG = Next Gen Accelerator Program entrant
- w/o = Walkover
- r = Retired
- d = Defaulted

=== First qualifier ===
First round
1	(Italy) Andreas Seppi	7^{7}	7^{8}
(Spain) Iván Navarro	6^{3}	6^{6}
(Serbia and Montenegro) Dušan Vemić	6	4	3
(Croatia) Saša Tuksar	4	6	6
(France) Sébastien De Chaunac	7^{7}	6
(Italy) Massimo Dell'Acqua	6^{1}	4
(Belgium) Steve Darcis	2	6	3
32	(Israel) Noam Okun	6	4	6

Second round
1	(Italy) Andreas Seppi	3	3
(Croatia) Saša Tuksar	6	6
(France) Sébastien De Chaunac	6	5	5
32	(Israel) Noam Okun	3	7	7

Qualifying competition
(Croatia) Saša Tuksar	6	3	6
32	(Israel) Noam Okun	3	6	2

=== Second qualifier ===
First round
2	(Switzerland) Stan Wawrinka	6	6
(Germany) Tobias Summerer	1	0
(Japan) Gouichi Motomura	1	6	3
(Germany) Daniel Elsner	6	4	6
(France) Jérôme Golmard	0	2
(Brazil) Júlio Silva	6	6
(France) Nicolas Devilder	4	7	7
30	(United States) Alex Bogomolov Jr.	6	5	5

Second round
2	(Switzerland) Stan Wawrinka	6	4	6
(Germany) Daniel Elsner	3	6	2
(Brazil) Júlio Silva	6	0	7
(France) Nicolas Devilder	1	6	9

Qualifying competition
2	(Switzerland) Stan Wawrinka	6	3	6
(France) Nicolas Devilder	4	6	4

=== Third qualifier ===
First round
3	(Germany) Tomas Behrend	6	6
(Austria) Alexander Peya	2	1
(Russia) Teymuraz Gabashvili	3	1
(Chile) Paul Capdeville	6	6
(Belgium) Gilles Elseneer	1	6	2
(Russia) Yuri Schukin	6	4	6
(Netherlands) Melle van Gemerden	2	0^{r}
28	(United States) Hugo Armando	6	2

Second round
3	(Germany) Tomas Behrend	6	6
(Chile) Paul Capdeville	3	2
(Russia) Yuri Schukin	1	3
28	(United States) Hugo Armando	6	6

Qualifying competition
3	(Germany) Tomas Behrend	6	6
28	(United States) Hugo Armando	2	3

=== Fourth qualifier ===
First round
4	(Finland) Jarkko Nieminen	7	6
(United States) Bobby Reynolds	5	1
WC	(France) Josselin Ouanna	4	6^{2}
(Sweden) Filip Prpic	6	7^{7}
(Mexico) Miguel Gallardo Valles	3	6^{4}
(Poland) Łukasz Kubot	6	7^{7}
WC	(France) Mathieu Montcourt	5	7^{7}	1
27	(Argentina) Juan Pablo Brzezicki	7	6^{4}	6

Second round
4	(Finland) Jarkko Nieminen	6	6
(Sweden) Filip Prpic	0	3
(Poland) Łukasz Kubot	1	7	2
27	(Argentina) Juan Pablo Brzezicki	6	5	6

Qualifying competition
4	(Finland) Jarkko Nieminen	6	3	6
27	(Argentina) Juan Pablo Brzezicki	4	6	1

=== Fifth qualifier ===
First round
5	(Italy) Alessio di Mauro	6	6
WC	(France) David Guez	4	3
(France) Jean-Christophe Faurel	2	6	6
(Czech Republic) Lukáš Dlouhý	6	3	8
(Switzerland) Marco Chiudinelli	6	0	4
(Spain) Marc López	3	6	6
(Australia) Todd Reid	2	4
26	(Switzerland) George Bastl	6	6

Second round
5	(Italy) Alessio di Mauro	4	4
(Czech Republic) Lukáš Dlouhý	6	6
(Spain) Marc López	6	6
26	(Switzerland) George Bastl	2	1

Qualifying competition
(Czech Republic) Lukáš Dlouhý	6	2	6
(Spain) Marc López	4	6	3

=== Sixth qualifier ===
First round
6	(Czech Republic) Ivo Minář	7	3	0
(Argentina) Sergio Roitman	5	6	6
(Italy) Paolo Lorenzi	2	3
(Spain) Daniel Gimeno-Traver	6	6
(Italy) Uros Vico	2	4
(Denmark) Kristian Pless	6	6
(Sweden) Marcus Sarstrand	3	6	6
25	(Slovakia) Michal Mertiňák	6	4	4

Second round
(Argentina) Sergio Roitman	6^{2}	7^{8}	3
(Spain) Daniel Gimeno-Traver	7^{7}	6^{6}	6
(Denmark) Kristian Pless	6	6
(Sweden) Marcus Sarstrand	3	3

Qualifying competition
(Spain) Daniel Gimeno-Traver	6	4	8
(Denmark) Kristian Pless	4	6	6

=== Seventh qualifier ===
First round
7	(Czech Republic) Bohdan Ulihrach	2	6	6
(Brazil) Thiago Alves	6	4	3
(Spain) Fernando Vicente	7	7
(Italy) Leonardo Azzaro	5	5
(France) Jean-Michel Pequery	6	7
(United States) Jeff Salzenstein	4	5
(United States) Brian Vahaly	6	6
23	(Sweden) Michael Ryderstedt	3	4

Second round
7	(Czech Republic) Bohdan Ulihrach	2	6	2
(Spain) Fernando Vicente	6	2	6
(France) Jean-Michel Pequery	1	4
(United States) Brian Vahaly	6	6

Qualifying competition
(Spain) Fernando Vicente	6	6
(United States) Brian Vahaly	3	1

=== Eighth qualifier ===
First round
8	(France) Antony Dupuis	6	7
(Italy) Federico Luzzi	4	5
(Norway) Jan Frode Andersen	3	6	6
(South Africa) Rik de Voest	6	3	0
(Finland) Tuomas Ketola	3	1
(Argentina) Juan Pablo Guzmán	6	6
(Austria) Daniel Köllerer	4	3
19	(Brazil) Flávio Saretta	6	6

Second round
8	(France) Antony Dupuis	6	6
(Norway) Jan Frode Andersen	3	2
(Argentina) Juan Pablo Guzmán	3	6	7
19	(Brazil) Flávio Saretta	6	3	9

Qualifying competition
8	(France) Antony Dupuis	6	5	6
19	(Brazil) Flávio Saretta	3	7	4

=== Ninth qualifier ===
First round
9	(Ecuador) Giovanni Lapentti	3	1
(Italy) Andrea Stoppini	6	6
(Spain) Albert Portas	6	1	2
(Germany) Michael Berrer	2	6	6
(Mexico) Alejandro Hernández	0	0^{r}
(Argentina) Cristian Villagrán	6	3
(United States) Brian Baker	4	6	9
21	(Czech Republic) Robin Vik	6	4	11

Second round
(Italy) Andrea Stoppini	2	6	6
(Germany) Michael Berrer	6	0	2
(Argentina) Cristian Villagrán	2	4
21	(Czech Republic) Robin Vik	6	6

Qualifying competition
(Italy) Andrea Stoppini	1	1
21	(Czech Republic) Robin Vik	6	6

=== Tenth qualifier ===
First round
10	(France) Grégory Carraz	6	6
(Austria) Oliver Marach	4	2
(United States) Matías Boeker	5	7^{7}	6
(Austria) Werner Eschauer	7	6^{1}	1
(Brazil) Marcos Daniel	1	6	6
(Colombia) Alejandro Falla	6	1	1
(Argentina) Nicolás Todero	6^{4}	6	0
22	(Switzerland) Ivo Heuberger	7^{7}	2	6

Second round
10	(France) Grégory Carraz	2	7	2
(United States) Matías Boeker	6	5	6
(Brazil) Marcos Daniel	6	7^{7}
22	(Switzerland) Ivo Heuberger	3	6^{4}

Qualifying competition
(United States) Matías Boeker	5	0
(Brazil) Marcos Daniel	7	6

=== Eleventh qualifier ===
First round
11	(Ecuador) Nicolás Lapentti	6	3	5
WC	(France) Jérémy Chardy	3	6	7
(Paraguay) Ramón Delgado	6	4	7
(Japan) Takao Suzuki	3	6	5
(Canada) Frédéric Niemeyer	6	6
(Ukraine) Sergiy Stakhovsky	3	1
(Israel) Dudi Sela	7	6
31	(United States) Amer Delić	5	4

Second round
WC	(France) Jérémy Chardy	3	0
(Paraguay) Ramón Delgado	6	6
(Canada) Frédéric Niemeyer	6	5	7
(Israel) Dudi Sela	2	7	9

Qualifying competition
(Paraguay) Ramón Delgado	0	6^{6}
(Israel) Dudi Sela	6	7^{8}

=== Twelfth qualifier ===
First round
12	(Italy) Francesco Aldi	6^{5}	6	7
(Romania) Victor Ioniță	7^{7}	2	5
(Italy) Giorgio Galimberti	6^{6}	4
(Argentina) Franco Squillari	7^{8}	6
(Brazil) André Sá	1	3
(Belgium) Jeroen Masson	6	6
(Spain) Galo Blanco	1	4
29	(Italy) Tomas Tenconi	6	6

Second round
12	(Italy) Francesco Aldi	2	7	5
(Argentina) Franco Squillari	6	5	7
(Belgium) Jeroen Masson	6	2	5
29	(Italy) Tomas Tenconi	2	6	7

Qualifying competition
(Argentina) Franco Squillari	6^{4}	6	0
29	(Italy) Tomas Tenconi	7^{7}	0	6

=== Thirteenth qualifier ===
First round
13	(France) Nicolas Mahut	3	3
(Slovakia) Ladislav Švarc	6	6
WC	(France) Alexandre Sidorenko	4	1
(Czech Republic) Tomáš Cakl	6	6
(United States) Robert Kendrick	6	3	2
(Georgia (country)) Irakli Labadze	4	6	6
(United States) Cecil Mamiit	4	6^{2}
17	(United States) James Blake	6	7^{7}

Second round
(Slovakia) Ladislav Švarc	2	6^{5}
(Czech Republic) Tomáš Cakl	6	7^{7}
(Georgia (country)) Irakli Labadze	3	7	4
17	(United States) James Blake	6	5	6

Qualifying competition
(Czech Republic) Tomáš Cakl	6	1	1
17	(United States) James Blake	2	6	6

=== Fourteenth qualifier ===
First round
14	(France) Olivier Mutis	6^{5}	2
(Argentina) Carlos Berlocq	7^{7}	6
PR	(Sweden) Jacob Adaktusson	4	3
(Australia) Chris Guccione	6	6
(Costa Rica) Juan Antonio Marín	6^{5}	7^{7}	7
(Croatia) Roko Karanušić	7^{7}	6^{5}	5
WC	(France) Laurent Recouderc	4	6	3
18	(Belgium) Dick Norman	6	3	6

Second round
(Argentina) Carlos Berlocq	6^{5}	6	5
(Australia) Chris Guccione	7^{7}	1	7
(Costa Rica) Juan Antonio Marín	1	6	2
18	(Belgium) Dick Norman	6	3	6

Qualifying competition
(Australia) Chris Guccione	6	6
18	(Belgium) Dick Norman	4	2

=== Fifteenth qualifier ===
First round
15	(Serbia and Montenegro) Novak Djokovic	6	6
(United States) Glenn Weiner	2	3
WC	(France) Gary Lugassy	3	1
(Brazil) Franco Ferreiro	6	6
(Germany) Simon Greul	4	6	4
(United Kingdom) Alex Bogdanovic	6	3	6
(France) Marc Gicquel	7	6
24	(Spain) Rubén Ramírez Hidalgo	5	0

Second round
15	(Serbia and Montenegro) Novak Djokovic	6	6
(Brazil) Franco Ferreiro	4	4
(United Kingdom) Alex Bogdanovic	2	4
(France) Marc Gicquel	6	6

Qualifying competition
15	(Serbia and Montenegro) Novak Djokovic	6	7^{7}
(France) Marc Gicquel	4	6^{5}

=== Sixteenth qualifier ===
First round
16	(Italy) Daniele Bracciali	7	6
(Czech Republic) Pavel Šnobel	5	2
PR	(Sweden) Björn Rehnquist	2	0
WC	(France) Édouard Roger-Vasselin	6	6
(Austria) Zbynek Mlynarik	6	6
(India) Harsh Mankad	3	4
WC	(France) Nicolas Renavand	0	1
20	(Belgium) Kristof Vliegen	6	6

Second round
16	(Italy) Daniele Bracciali	6	6
WC	(France) Édouard Roger-Vasselin	2	3
(Austria) Zbynek Mlynarik	4	2
20	(Belgium) Kristof Vliegen	6	6

Qualifying competition
16	(Italy) Daniele Bracciali	4	3
20	(Belgium) Kristof Vliegen	6	6
