= 2008 French Open – Women's doubles =

Women's doubles
- 2008 French Open

Final
- Champion: (Spain) Anabel Medina Garrigues (Spain) Virginia Ruano Pascual
- Runner-up: (Australia) Casey Dellacqua (Italy) Francesca Schiavone
- Score: 2–6, 7–5, 6–4

Details
- Draw: 64 (7 WC )
- Seeds: 16

Events
Singles	men	women		boys	girls
Doubles	men	women	mixed	boys	girls
WC Singles	men	women	quad
WC Doubles	men	women	quad
Legends	−45	45+	women
← 2007 ·	French Open	· 2009 →

Alicia Molik and Mara Santangelo were the defending champions, but lost in the first round to Sara Errani and Bethanie Mattek.

Anabel Medina Garrigues and Virginia Ruano Pascual won the title, defeating Casey Dellacqua and Francesca Schiavone in the final 2–6, 7–5, 6–4.

== Seeds ==
1. (Zimbabwe) Cara Black / (United States) Liezel Huber (semifinals)
2. (Slovenia) Katarina Srebotnik / (Japan) Ai Sugiyama (second round)
3. (Czech Republic) Květa Peschke / (Australia) Rennae Stubbs (third round)
4. (Chinese Taipei) Chan Yung-jan / (Chinese Taipei) Chuang Chia-jung (quarterfinals)
5. (Australia) Alicia Molik / (Italy) Mara Santangelo (first round)
6. (Belarus) Victoria Azarenka / (Israel) Shahar Pe'er (quarterfinals)
7. (Ukraine) Alona Bondarenko / (Ukraine) Kateryna Bondarenko (semifinals)
8. (China) Yan Zi / (China) Zheng Jie (third round)
9. (Russia) Dinara Safina / (Hungary) Ágnes Szávay (third round)
10. (Spain) Anabel Medina Garrigues / (Spain) Virginia Ruano Pascual (champions)
11. (China) Peng Shuai / (China) Sun Tiantian (third round)
12. (United States) Lisa Raymond / (Australia) Samantha Stosur (third round)
13. (Czech Republic) Iveta Benešová / (Slovakia) Janette Husárová (first round)
14. (France) Nathalie Dechy / (Russia) Elena Likhovtseva (second round)
15. (Ukraine) Mariya Koryttseva / (Czech Republic) Vladimíra Uhlířová (third round)
16. (Belarus) Tatiana Poutchek / (Russia) Anastasia Rodionova (second round)

== Draw ==
=== Key ===
- Q = Qualifier
- WC = Wild card
- LL = Lucky loser
- Alt = Alternate
- ITF = ITF entry
- PR = Protected ranking
- SR = Special ranking
- SE = Special exempt
- JE = Junior exempt
- JR = Junior Accelerator Programme entrant
- CO = College Accelerator Programme entrant
- NG = Next Gen Accelerator Program entrant
- w/o = Walkover
- r = Retired
- d = Defaulted

=== Finals ===
Quarterfinals
1	(Zimbabwe) Cara Black (United States) Liezel Huber	7	6
(Spain) Nuria Llagostera Vives (Spain) María José Martínez Sánchez	6^{6}	2
4	(Chinese Taipei) Chan Yung-jan (Chinese Taipei) Chuang Chia-jung	7	5	5
10	(Spain) Anabel Medina Garrigues (Spain) Virginia Ruano Pascual	6^{4}	7	7
6	(Belarus) Victoria Azarenka (Israel) Shahar Pe'er	6^{4}	5
(Australia) Casey Dellacqua (Italy) Francesca Schiavone	7	7
7	(Ukraine) Alona Bondarenko (Ukraine) Kateryna Bondarenko	6	6
(United States) Ashley Harkleroad (Russia) Galina Voskoboeva	3	3

Semifinals
1	(Zimbabwe) Cara Black (United States) Liezel Huber	4	6^{2}
10	(Spain) Anabel Medina Garrigues (Spain) Virginia Ruano Pascual	6	7
(Australia) Casey Dellacqua (Italy) Francesca Schiavone	6	6
7	(Ukraine) Alona Bondarenko (Ukraine) Kateryna Bondarenko	2	1

Final
10	(Spain) Anabel Medina Garrigues (Spain) Virginia Ruano Pascual	2	7	6
(Australia) Casey Dellacqua (Italy) Francesca Schiavone	6	5	4

=== Top half ===
==== Section 1 ====
First round
1	(Zimbabwe) C Black (United States) L Huber	6	6
(Poland) K Jans (Bosnia and Herzegovina) M Jugić-Salkić	3	4
(Russia) A Kleybanova (Russia) E Makarova	7	6
(Russia) V Dushevina (Ukraine) T Perebiynis	5	3
(Belarus) D Kustova (Czech Republic) K Zakopalová	1	4
WC	(France) S Lefèvre (France) A Védy	6	6
(Romania) IR Olaru (Spain) A Parra Santonja	3	2
15	(Ukraine) M Koryttseva (Czech Republic) V Uhlířová	6	6
12	(United States) L Raymond (Australia) S Stosur	6	6
(Uzbekistan) A Amanmuradova (Germany) J Wöhr	3	2
WC	(France) A Hesse (France) K Mladenovic	1	3
WC	(France) J Coin (France) V Huck	6	6
(Italy) ME Camerin (Argentina) G Dulko	6^{3}	6	5
(Spain) N Llagostera Vives (Spain) MJ Martínez Sánchez	7	3	7
(Italy) S Errani (United States) B Mattek	6	6
5	(Australia) A Molik (Italy) M Santangelo	4	2

Second round
1	(Zimbabwe) C Black (United States) L Huber	6	6^{4}	6
(Russia) A Kleybanova (Russia) E Makarova	4	7	2
WC	(France) S Lefèvre (France) A Védy	3	6	2
15	(Ukraine) M Koryttseva (Czech Republic) V Uhlířová	6	4	6
12	(United States) L Raymond (Australia) S Stosur	7	6
WC	(France) J Coin (France) V Huck	6^{4}	0
(Spain) N Llagostera Vives (Spain) MJ Martínez Sánchez	7	5	6
(Italy) S Errani (United States) B Mattek	6^{4}	7	4

Third round
1	(Zimbabwe) C Black (United States) L Huber	3	6	6
15	(Ukraine) M Koryttseva (Czech Republic) V Uhlířová	6	2	0
12	(United States) L Raymond (Australia) S Stosur	5	3
(Spain) N Llagostera Vives (Spain) MJ Martínez Sánchez	7	6

Quarterfinals
1	(Zimbabwe) C Black (United States) L Huber	7	6
(Spain) N Llagostera Vives (Spain) MJ Martínez Sánchez	6^{6}	2

==== Section 2 ====
First round
4	(Chinese Taipei) Y-j Chan (Chinese Taipei) C-j Chuang	6	6
(Japan) A Morigami (Japan) A Nakamura	0	1
(Paraguay) R de los Ríos (Bulgaria) T Pironkova	7	1	6
WC	(France) O Sanchez (France) L Thorpe	5	6	3
(Austria) S Bammer (Germany) S Lisicki	3	5
(Czech Republic) L Hradecká (Czech Republic) R Voráčová	6	7
Alt	(South Africa) N Grandin (United States) R Kops-Jones	1	7	7
13	(Czech Republic) I Benešová (Slovakia) J Husárová	6	5	5
10	(Spain) A Medina Garrigues (Spain) V Ruano Pascual	7	6^{6}	6
(Poland) A Radwańska (Poland) U Radwańska	6^{3}	7	3
(New Zealand) M Erakovic (Netherlands) M Krajicek	4	6^{3}
(France) É Loit (France) P Parmentier	6	7
(Argentina) ME Salerni (Tunisia) S Sfar	2	1
(Romania) E Gallovits (Romania) M Niculescu	6	6
(Russia) A Kudryavtseva (Germany) M Müller	1	0
8	(China) Z Yan (China) J Zheng	6	6

Second round
4	(Chinese Taipei) Y-j Chan (Chinese Taipei) C-j Chuang	6	6
(Paraguay) R de los Ríos (Bulgaria) T Pironkova	2	2
(Czech Republic) L Hradecká (Czech Republic) R Voráčová	3	0
Alt	(South Africa) N Grandin (United States) R Kops-Jones	6	6
10	(Spain) A Medina Garrigues (Spain) V Ruano Pascual	6	6
(France) É Loit (France) P Parmentier	1	1
(Romania) E Gallovits (Romania) M Niculescu	6	5	1
8	(China) Z Yan (China) J Zheng	2	7	6

Third round
4	(Chinese Taipei) Y-j Chan (Chinese Taipei) C-j Chuang	6	6
Alt	(South Africa) N Grandin (United States) R Kops-Jones	3	0
10	(Spain) A Medina Garrigues (Spain) V Ruano Pascual	6	6
8	(China) Z Yan (China) J Zheng	4	3

Quarterfinals
4	(Chinese Taipei) Y-j Chan (Chinese Taipei) C-j Chuang	7	5	5
10	(Spain) A Medina Garrigues (Spain) V Ruano Pascual	6 ^{4}	7	7

=== Bottom half ===
==== Section 3 ====
First round
6	(Belarus) V Azarenka (Israel) S Pe'er	7	6
(Colombia) C Castaño (Estonia) K Kanepi	6^{4}	1
WC	(France) S Brémond (France) M Johansson	7	2	6
(Chinese Taipei) S-w Hsieh (United States) V King	5	6	4
(Poland) M Domachowska (Poland) A Rosolska	6	6
(China) C Ji (China) S Sun	4	2
(Italy) T Garbin (Italy) R Vinci	2	7	0
11	(China) S Peng (China) T Sun	6	6^{4}	6
16	(Belarus) T Poutchek (Russia) A Rodionova	7	7
(Belarus) E Dzehalevich (Belarus) O Govortsova	6^{4}	6^{5}
(Australia) C Dellacqua (Italy) F Schiavone	6	6
(Russia) N Petrova (Switzerland) P Schnyder	3	2
(Russia) E Vesnina (Russia) V Zvonareva	6	6
(Sweden) S Arvidsson (Czech Republic) B Záhlavová Strýcová	1	3
(Czech Republic) P Cetkovská (Czech Republic) L Šafářová	6	3	0
3	(Czech Republic) K Peschke (Australia) R Stubbs	4	6	6

Second round
6	(Belarus) V Azarenka (Israel) S Pe'er	6	6
WC	(France) S Brémond (France) M Johansson	2	2
(Poland) M Domachowska (Poland) A Rosolska	3	2
11	(China) S Peng (China) T Sun	6	6
16	(Belarus) T Poutchek (Russia) A Rodionova	3	7	1
(Australia) C Dellacqua (Italy) F Schiavone	6	6^{4}	6
(Russia) E Vesnina (Russia) V Zvonareva	0	4
3	(Czech Republic) K Peschke (Australia) R Stubbs	6	6

Third round
6	(Belarus) V Azarenka (Israel) S Pe'er	5	7	6
11	(China) S Peng (China) T Sun	7	6^{3}	2
(Australia) C Dellacqua (Italy) F Schiavone	7	3	6
3	(Czech Republic) K Peschke (Australia) R Stubbs	5	6	4

Quarterfinals
6	(Belarus) V Azarenka (Israel) S Pe'er	6^{4}	5
(Australia) C Dellacqua (Italy) F Schiavone	7	7

==== Section 4 ====
First round
7	(Ukraine) A Bondarenko (Ukraine) K Bondarenko	6	2	6
(Slovakia) D Cibulková (Czech Republic) E Hrdinová	0	6	2
(Switzerland) T Bacsinszky (France) A Cornet	6	2
(Czech Republic) G Navrátilová (Austria) T Paszek	4	0^{r}
WC	(France) S Cohen-Aloro (France) C Pin	5	2
(Russia) M Kirilenko (Italy) F Pennetta	7	6
(France) S Foretz (Ukraine) O Savchuk	4	1
9	(Russia) D Safina (Hungary) Á Szávay	6	6
14	(France) N Dechy (Russia) E Likhovtseva	6	6
(France) V Razzano (Belgium) Y Wickmayer	2	3
(Romania) S Cîrstea (France) A Rezaï	4	6	6
(Russia) Y Shvedova (Thailand) T Tanasugarn	6	2	2
WC	(France) Y Fedossova (France) V Pichet	6	4	1
(United States) A Harkleroad (Russia) G Voskoboeva	4	6	6
(United States) J Craybas (Denmark) C Wozniacki	0	1
2	(Slovenia) K Srebotnik (Japan) A Sugiyama	6	6

Second round
7	(Ukraine) A Bondarenko (Ukraine) K Bondarenko	2	6	7
(Switzerland) T Bacsinszky (France) A Cornet	6	2	6^{7}
(Russia) M Kirilenko (Italy) F Pennetta	3	6^{4}
9	(Russia) D Safina (Hungary) Á Szávay	6	7
14	(France) N Dechy (Russia) E Likhovtseva	5	2
(Romania) S Cîrstea (France) A Rezaï	7	6
(United States) A Harkleroad (Russia) G Voskoboeva	6	4	6
2	(Slovenia) K Srebotnik (Japan) A Sugiyama	4	6	2

Third round
7	(Ukraine) A Bondarenko (Ukraine) K Bondarenko	6	0	7
9	(Russia) D Safina (Hungary) Á Szávay	4	6	6^{5}
(Romania) S Cîrstea (France) A Rezaï	3	2
(United States) A Harkleroad (Russia) G Voskoboeva	6	6

Quarterfinals
7	(Ukraine) A Bondarenko (Ukraine) K Bondarenko	6	6
(United States) A Harkleroad (Russia) G Voskoboeva	3	3
