= 2005 French Open – Girls' doubles =

Girls' doubles
- 2005 French Open

Final
- Champion: (Belarus) Victoria Azarenka (Hungary) Ágnes Szávay
- Runner-up: (Romania) Raluca-Ioana Olaru (Kazakhstan) Amina Rakhim
- Score: 4–6, 6–4, 6–0

Events
Singles	men	women		boys	girls
Doubles	men	women	mixed	boys	girls
WC Singles	men	women	quad
WC Doubles	men	women	quad
Legends	−45	45+	women
← 2004 ·	French Open	· 2006 →

Kateřina Böhmová and Michaëlla Krajicek were the defending champions, but did not compete in the Juniors that year.

Victoria Azarenka and Ágnes Szávay won the title, defeating Raluca-Ioana Olaru and Amina Rakhim in the final, 4–6, 6–4, 6–0.

== Seeds ==
1. (Chinese Taipei) Yung-Jan Chan / (Canada) Aleksandra Wozniak (semifinals)
2. (United States) Alexa Glatch / (Belarus) Olga Govortsova (quarterfinals)
3. (Belarus) Victoria Azarenka / (Hungary) Ágnes Szávay (champions)
4. (Canada) Sharon Fichman / (Denmark) Caroline Wozniacki (semifinals)
5. (Romania) Mihaela Buzărnescu / (Netherlands) Bibiane Schoofs (quarterfinals)
6. (Romania) Sorana Cîrstea / (Romania) Alexandra Dulgheru (first round)
7. (Romania) Mădălina Gojnea / (Romania) Monica Niculescu (quarterfinals)
8. (Romania) Raluca Olaru / (Kazakhstan) Amina Rakhim (final)

== Draw ==
=== Key ===
- Q = Qualifier
- WC = Wild card
- LL = Lucky loser
- Alt = Alternate
- SE = Special exempt
- PR = Protected ranking
- ITF = ITF entry
- JE = Junior exempt
- w/o = Walkover
- r = Retired
- d = Defaulted
- SR = Special ranking

=== Finals ===
Semifinals
1	(Chinese Taipei) Yung-Jan Chan (Canada) Aleksandra Wozniak	5	6	1
3	(Belarus) Victoria Azarenka (Hungary) Ágnes Szávay	7	4	6
4	(Canada) Sharon Fichman (Denmark) Caroline Wozniacki	4	1
8	(Romania) Raluca Olaru (Kazakhstan) Amina Rakhim	6	6

Final
3	(Belarus) Victoria Azarenka (Hungary) Ágnes Szávay	4	6	6
8	(Romania) Raluca Olaru (Kazakhstan) Amina Rakhim	6	4	0

=== Top half ===
First round
1	(Chinese Taipei) Yung-Jan Chan (Canada) Aleksandra Wozniak	6	5	6
(Switzerland) Timea Bacsinszky (Austria) Tamira Paszek	1	7	2
(United States) Ellah Nze (United States) Jennifer Stevens	3	6	6
(France) Alice Bellicha (France) Estelle Guisard	6	0	1
(Australia) Olivia Lukaszewicz (Australia) Shayna McDowell	6	2	5
(Russia) Anastasia Pavlyuchenkova (Russia) Yaroslava Shvedova	4	6	7
(Poland) Agnieszka Radwańska (Poland) Urszula Radwańska	5	3
5	(Romania) Mihaela Buzărnescu (Netherlands) Bibiane Schoofs	7	6
3	(Belarus) Victoria Azarenka (Hungary) Ágnes Szávay	5	6	6
(Czech Republic) Kateřina Kramperová (Russia) Ekaterina Makarova	7	1	0
(United States) Vania King (United States) Yasmin Schnack	6	6
(France) Mailyne Andrieux (France) Louise Doutrelant	3	3
(Argentina) Florencia Molinero (Brazil) Roxane Vaisemberg	6	6
(France) Yulia Fedossova (France) Violette Huck	3	2
(United States) Yvette Hyndman (Georgia (country)) Anna Tatishvili	6	2	9
6	(Romania) Sorana Cîrstea (Romania) Alexandra Dulgheru	3	6	7

Second round
1	(Chinese Taipei) Y-J Chan (Canada) A Wozniak	6	6
(United States) E Nze (United States) J Stevens	2	1
(Russia) A Pavlyuchenkova (Russia) Y Shvedova	4	3
5	(Romania) M Buzărnescu (Netherlands) B Schoofs	6	6
3	(Belarus) V Azarenka (Hungary) Á Szávay	6	6
(United States) V King (United States) Y Schnack	1	3
(Argentina) F Molinero (Brazil) R Vaisemberg	6	6
(United States) Y Hyndman (Georgia (country)) A Tatishvili	1	2

Quarterfinals
1	(Chinese Taipei) Y-J Chan (Canada) A Wozniak	3	6	7
5	(Romania) M Buzărnescu (Netherlands) B Schoofs	6	1	5
3	(Belarus) V Azarenka (Hungary) Á Szávay	7	6
(Argentina) F Molinero (Brazil) R Vaisemberg	5	4

Semifinals
1	(Chinese Taipei) Y-J Chan (Canada) A Wozniak	5	6	1
3	(Belarus) V Azarenka (Hungary) Á Szávay	7	4	6

=== Bottom half ===
First round
7	(Romania) Mădălina Gojnea (Romania) Monica Niculescu	6	6
(Ukraine) Kristina Antoniychuk (Slovakia) Magdaléna Rybáriková	1	2
(Bolivia) María Fernanda Álvarez Terán (Germany) Dominice Ripoll	6	1	7
(United States) Jennifer-Lee Heinser (United States) Elizabeth Plotkin	3	6	5
(United States) Julia Cohen (United States) Andrea Remynse	3	6^{3}
(Japan) Ayumi Morita (Japan) Erika Sema	6	7^{7}
(France) Alizé Cornet (France) Aravane Rezaï
4	(Canada) Sharon Fichman (Denmark) Caroline Wozniacki	w/o
8	(Romania) Raluca Olaru (Kazakhstan) Amina Rakhim	7	4	6
(Russia) Evgenia Grebenyuk (United States) Krystina Marcio	5	6	4
(France) Gracia Radovanovic (France) Charlotte Rodier	1	1
(Canada) Mélanie Gloria (Canada) Valérie Tétreault	6	6
(Russia) Alisa Kleybanova (Russia) Evgeniya Rodina	6	6
(Italy) Sara Errani (Italy) Karin Knapp	4	2
WC	(France) Charlotte Douwma (France) Laurene Fayol	0	2
2	(United States) Alexa Glatch (Belarus) Olga Govortsova	6	6

Second round
7	(Romania) M Gojnea (Romania) M Niculescu	6	6
(Bolivia) MF Álvarez Terán (Germany) D Ripoll	4	0
(Japan) A Morita (Japan) E Sema	6	5	2
4	(Canada) S Fichman (Denmark) C Wozniacki	4	7	6
8	(Romania) R Olaru (Kazakhstan) A Rakhim	6	6
(Canada) M Gloria (Canada) V Tétreault	1	1
(Russia) A Kleybanova (Russia) E Rodina	2	6	8
2	(United States) A Glatch (Belarus) O Govortsova	6	3	10

Quarterfinals
7	(Romania) M Gojnea (Romania) M Niculescu	6	4	4
4	(Canada) S Fichman (Denmark) C Wozniacki	3	6	6
8	(Romania) R Olaru (Kazakhstan) A Rakhim	6	6
2	(United States) A Glatch (Belarus) O Govortsova	2	1

Semifinals
4	(Canada) S Fichman (Denmark) C Wozniacki	4	1
8	(Romania) R Olaru (Kazakhstan) A Rakhim	6	6

== Sources ==
- Draw
