= 2005 French Open – Girls' singles =

Tennis tournament

Girls' singles
- 2005 French Open

Final
- Champion: (Hungary) Ágnes Szávay
- Runner-up: (Romania) Raluca Olaru
- Score: 6–2, 6–1

Events
Singles	men	women		boys	girls
Doubles	men	women	mixed	boys	girls
WC Singles	men	women	quad
WC Doubles	men	women	quad
Legends	−45	45+	women
← 2004 ·	French Open	· 2006 →

Ágnes Szávay won the title, defeating Raluca Olaru in the final 6–2, 6–1.

Sesil Karatantcheva was the defending champion, but chose to compete in the women's singles competition, where she reached the quarterfinals, losing to 16th seed Elena Likhovtseva.

== Seeds ==
1. (United States) Jessica Kirkland (second round)
2. (Belarus) Victoria Azarenka (second round)
3. (Chinese Taipei) Chan Yung-jan (second round)
4. (Canada) Aleksandra Wozniak (first round)
5. (Switzerland) Timea Bacsinszky (quarterfinals)
6. (Russia) Ekaterina Makarova (third round)
7. (Romania) Monica Niculescu (second round)
8. (Hungary) Ágnes Szávay (champion)
9. (Romania) Alexandra Dulgheru (second round)
10. (United States) Alexa Glatch (third round)
11. (France) Aravane Rezaï (first round)
12. (Denmark) Caroline Wozniacki (third round)
13. (Belarus) Olga Govortsova (third round)
14. (Romania) Raluca Olaru (final)
15. (Romania) Mădălina Gojnea (third round)
16. (United States) Vania King (third round)

== Draw ==
=== Key ===
- Q = Qualifier
- WC = Wild card
- LL = Lucky loser
- Alt = Alternate
- SE = Special exempt
- PR = Protected ranking
- ITF = ITF entry
- JE = Junior exempt
- w/o = Walkover
- r = Retired
- d = Defaulted
- SR = Special ranking

=== Finals ===
Quarterfinals
(Netherlands) Bibiane Schoofs	6	3	4
(Japan) Ayumi Morita	4	6	6
14	(Romania) Raluca Olaru	6	6
5	(Switzerland) Timea Bacsinszky	2	3
8	(Hungary) Ágnes Szávay	6	6
(Russia) Evgeniya Rodina	1	3
WC	(France) Yulia Fedossova	4	3
(Russia) Alisa Kleybanova	6	6

Semifinals
(Japan) Ayumi Morita	6	0	2
14	(Romania) Raluca Olaru	4	6	6
8	(Hungary) Ágnes Szávay	6	6
(Russia) Alisa Kleybanova	1	3

Final
14	(Romania) Raluca Olaru	2	1
8	(Hungary) Ágnes Szávay	6	6

=== Top half ===
==== Section 1 ====
First round
1	(United States) Jessica Kirkland	6	6
LL	(Germany) Dominice Ripoll	0	2
WC	(France) Laurene Fayol	0	4
(Netherlands) Bibiane Schoofs	6	6
(Canada) Sharon Fichman	3	3
(Brazil) Roxane Vaisemberg	6	6
(Czech Republic) Kateřina Kramperová	6	1	4
13	(Belarus) Olga Govortsova	2	6	6
9	(Romania) Alexandra Dulgheru	6	6
WC	(France) Gracia Radovanovic	3	1
(United States) Elizabeth Plotkin	2	1
(Japan) Ayumi Morita	6	6
(United States) Andrea Remynse	6^{3}	2
WC	(France) Louise Doutrelant	7^{7}	6
(Kazakhstan) Amina Rakhim	7^{7}	2	5
6	(Russia) Ekaterina Makarova	6^{5}	6	7

Second round
1	(United States) J Kirkland	7^{7}	1	7
(Netherlands) B Schoofs	6^{4}	6	9
(Brazil) R Vaisemberg	6	2	3
13	(Belarus) O Govortsova	4	6	6
9	(Romania) A Dulgheru	3	2
(Japan) A Morita	6	6
WC	(France) L Doutrelant	3	2
6	(Russia) E Makarova	6	6

Third round
(Netherlands) B Schoofs	6	7^{7}
13	(Belarus) O Govortsova	4	6^{5}
(Japan) A Morita	7^{7}	6
6	(Russia) E Makarova	6^{3}	4

Quarterfinals
(Netherlands) B Schoofs	6	3	4
(Japan) A Morita	4	6	6

==== Section 2 ====
First round
4	(Canada) Aleksandra Wozniak	6	4	4
WC	(France) Mailyne Andrieux	4	6	6
(Russia) Alla Kudryavtseva	6	6
(United States) Yasmin Schnack	4	3
(France) Irena Pavlovic	3	6	6
(Slovenia) Polona Reberšak	6	4	4
(Italy) Karin Knapp	3	4
14	(Romania) Raluca Olaru	6	6
12	(Denmark) Caroline Wozniacki	6	2	6
(Romania) Mihaela Buzărnescu	3	6	4
Q	(Australia) Shayna McDowell	6^{3}	2
WC	(France) Alizé Cornet	7^{7}	6
(United States) Krystina Marcio	0	2
(Poland) Agnieszka Radwańska	6	6
Q	(Russia) Yaroslava Shvedova	1	6	2
5	(Switzerland) Timea Bacsinszky	6	3	6

Second round
WC	(France) M Andrieux	6	6
(Russia) A Kudryavtseva	1	4
(France) I Pavlovic	2	5
14	(Romania) R Olaru	6	7
12	(Denmark) C Wozniacki	5	6	6
WC	(France) A Cornet	7	2	2
(Poland) A Radwańska	6	2	3
5	(Switzerland) T Bacsinszky	3	6	6

Third round
WC	(France) M Andrieux	3	3
14	(Romania) R Olaru	6	6
12	(Denmark) C Wozniacki	6	5	3
5	(Switzerland) T Bacsinszky	4	7	6

Quarterfinals
14	(Romania) R Olaru	6	6
5	(Switzerland) T Bacsinszky	2	3

=== Bottom half ===
==== Section 3 ====
First round
8	(Hungary) Ágnes Szávay	4	6	6
WC	(France) Violette Huck	6	3	3
(Austria) Tamira Paszek	4	6	4
(Georgia (country)) Anna Tatishvili	6	3	6
(Canada) Valérie Tétreault	7	6
Q	(Australia) Olivia Lukaszewicz	5	1
Q	(Russia) Anastasia Pavlyuchenkova	2	2
10	(United States) Alexa Glatch	6	6
15	(Romania) Mădălina Gojnea	6	6
(Italy) Sara Errani	3	1
(Ukraine) Kristina Antoniychuk	6	6
(Bolivia) Maria-Fernanda Alvarez-Teran	3	3
WC	(France) Estelle Guisard	4	3
(Russia) Evgeniya Rodina	6	6
LL	(United States) Ellah Nze	5	4
3	(Chinese Taipei) Yung-Jan Chan	7	6

Second round
8	(Hungary) Á Szávay	6	6
(Georgia (country)) A Tatishvili	3	2
(Canada) V Tétreault	2	0
10	(United States) A Glatch	6	6
15	(Romania) M Gojnea	6	6
(Ukraine) K Antoniychuk	0	1
(Russia) E Rodina	6	6
3	(Chinese Taipei) Y-J Chan	4	3

Third round
8	(Hungary) Á Szávay	6	7
10	(United States) A Glatch	3	5
15	(Romania) M Gojnea	6	2	2
(Russia) E Rodina	2	6	6

Quarterfinals
8	(Hungary) Á Szávay	6	6
(Russia) E Rodina	1	3

==== Section 4 ====
First round
7	(Romania) Monica Niculescu	3	7	7
(Russia) Evgenia Grebenyuk	6	5	5
WC	(France) Yulia Fedossova	6	7^{7}
Q	(United States) Jennifer Stevens	4	6^{5}
(United States) Jennifer-Lee Heinser	6	5	6
Q	(Poland) Marta Leśniak	3	7	4
Q	(Canada) Mélanie Gloria	3	6	6
11	(France) Aravane Rezaï	6	2	4
16	(United States) Vania King	6	6
Q	(France) Alice Bellicha	2	2
(Romania) Sorana Cîrstea	2	3
(Argentina) Florencia Molinero	6	6
(United States) Julia Cohen	6	3	5
(Russia) Alisa Kleybanova	4	6	7
(Slovakia) Magdaléna Rybáriková	2	6^{10}
2	(Belarus) Victoria Azarenka	6	7^{12}

Second round
7	(Romania) M Niculescu	6	1	4
WC	(France) Y Fedossova	3	6	6
(United States) J-L Heinser	3	6	6
Q	(Canada) M Gloria	6	4	3
16	(United States) V King	7^{7}	7^{7}
(Argentina) F Molinero	6^{2}	6^{5}
(Russia) A Kleybanova	7^{9}	4	8
2	(Belarus) V Azarenka	6^{7}	6	6

Third round
WC	(France) Y Fedossova	6	6^{5}	6
(United States) J-L Heinser	1	7^{7}	2
16	(United States) V King	3	1
(Russia) A Kleybanova	6	6

Quarterfinals
WC	(France) Y Fedossova	4	3
(Russia) A Kleybanova	6	6

== Sources ==
- Draw
