= 2005 French Open =

- Date: 23 May – 5 June 2005
- Edition: 104
- Category: 75th Grand Slam (ITF)
- Surface: Clay
- Location: Paris (XVI^{e}), France
- Venue: Stade Roland Garros

Champions

Men's singles
- (Spain) Rafael Nadal

Women's singles
- (Belgium) Justine Henin-Hardenne

Men's doubles
- (Sweden) Jonas Björkman / (Belarus) Max Mirnyi

Women's doubles
- (Spain) Virginia Ruano Pascual / (Argentina) Paola Suárez

Mixed doubles
- (France) Fabrice Santoro / (Slovakia) Daniela Hantuchová

Boys' singles
- (Croatia) Marin Čilić

Girls' singles
- (Hungary) Ágnes Szávay

Boys' doubles
- (Argentina) Emiliano Massa / (Argentina) Leonardo Mayer

Girls' doubles
- (Belarus) Victoria Azarenka / (Hungary) Ágnes Szávay
- French Open

The 2005 French Open was the 104th edition of the tournament.

On the men's side, Rafael Nadal, seeded fourth at his first French Open, was a strong favorite to win the singles title after winning the Monte Carlo and Rome Masters. Guillermo Coria, the defending finalist and 2005 runner-up to Nadal in both Monaco and Rome, called Nadal the best clay-court player in the world prior to the tournament. After defeating top seed Roger Federer in the semifinals, Nadal defeated Mariano Puerta to claim his first French Open title, and the first of four won consecutively from 2005 until 2008. Nadal would go on to win the tournament a record 14 times.

In the women's draw, Justine Henin-Hardenne won her second French Open title, defeating 2000 champion Mary Pierce in the final in just 62 minutes. 2005 marked the first of three consecutive years in which Henin would win the women's singles title.

Gastón Gaudio and Anastasia Myskina were unsuccessful in defending their 2004 titles, Gaudio losing in the fourth round and Myskina being upset in the first round. This tournament was also notable for the rise of future French Open champion Ana Ivanovic, who upset the third seed Amélie Mauresmo in the third round, before going on to defeat another future champion in Francesca Schiavone on her way to her first major quarterfinal appearance in just her second major tournament.

== Points distribution ==
Below are the tables with the point distribution for each discipline of the tournament.

=== Senior points ===
Event	W	F	SF	QF	Round of 16	Round of 32	Round of 64	Round of 128	Q	Q3	Q2	Q1
Men's singles	1000	700	450	250	150	75	35	5	12	8	4	0
Men's doubles	1000	700	450	250	150	75	0	—N/a	12	—N/a	0	0
Women's singles	650	456	292	162	90	56	32	2	30	21	12.5	4
Women's doubles	650	456	292	162	90	56	0	—N/a	30	—N/a	0	0

== Seniors ==
=== Men's singles ===
(Spain) Rafael Nadal defeated (Argentina) Mariano Puerta, 6–7^{(6–8)}, 6–3, 6–1, 7–5

- It was Nadal's 6th title of the year, and his 7th overall. It was his 1st career Grand Slam title.

=== Women's singles ===
(Belgium) Justine Henin-Hardenne defeated (France) Mary Pierce, 6–1, 6–1

- It was Henin-Hardenne's 4th title of the year, and her 23rd overall. It was her 4th career Grand Slam title, and her 2nd French Open title.

=== Men's doubles ===
(Sweden) Jonas Björkman / (Belarus) Max Mirnyi defeated (United States) Mike Bryan / (United States) Bob Bryan, 2–6, 6–1, 6–4

=== Women's doubles ===
(Spain) Virginia Ruano Pascual / (Argentina) Paola Suárez defeated (Zimbabwe) Cara Black / (South Africa) Liezel Huber, 4–6, 6–3, 6–3

=== Mixed doubles ===
(Slovakia) Daniela Hantuchová / (France) Fabrice Santoro defeated (United States) Martina Navratilova / (India) Leander Paes, 3–6, 6–3, 6–2

== Juniors ==
=== Boys' singles ===
(Croatia) Marin Čilić defeated (Netherlands) Antal van der Duim, 6–3, 6–1

=== Girls' singles ===
(Hungary) Ágnes Szávay defeated (Romania) Raluca-Ioana Olaru, 6–2, 6–1

=== Boys' doubles ===
(Argentina) Emiliano Massa / (Argentina) Leonardo Mayer defeated (Ukraine) Sergei Bubka / (France) Jérémy Chardy, 2–6, 6–3, 6–4

=== Girls' doubles ===
(Belarus) Victoria Azarenka / (Hungary) Ágnes Szávay defeated (Romania) Raluca-Ioana Olaru / (Kazakhstan) Amina Rakhim, 4–6, 6–4, 6–0

== Singles seeds ==
The following are the seeded players and notable players who withdrew from the event. Seedings are based on ATP and WTA rankings as of 16 May 2005. Rankings and points are as of before 23 May 2005.

=== Men's singles ===
Seed	Rank	Player	Points before	Points defending	Points won	Points after	Status
1	1	(Switzerland) Roger Federer	6,605	75	450	6,980	Semifinals lost to (Spain) Rafael Nadal [4]
2	3	(United States) Andy Roddick	3,590	35	35	3,590	Second round lost to (Argentina) José Acasuso
3	4	(Russia) Marat Safin	3,065	150	150	3,065	Fourth round lost to (Spain) Tommy Robredo [15]
4	5	(Spain) Rafael Nadal	2,600	0	1,000	3,600	Champion, defeated (Argentina) Mariano Puerta
5	6	(Argentina) Gastón Gaudio	2,440	1,000	150	1,590	Fourth round lost to (Spain) David Ferrer [20]
6	7	(United States) Andre Agassi	2,275	5	5	2,275	First round lost to (Finland) Jarkko Nieminen [Q]
7	8	(United Kingdom) Tim Henman	2,195	450	35	1,780	Second round lost to (Peru) Luis Horna
8	9	(Argentina) Guillermo Coria	2,040	700	150	1,490	Fourth round lost to (Russia) Nikolay Davydenko [12]
9	10	(Argentina) Guillermo Cañas	1,745	5	250	1,990	Quarterfinals lost to (Argentina) Mariano Puerta
10	11	(Argentina) David Nalbandian	1,685	450	150	1,385	Fourth round lost to (Romania) Victor Hănescu
~~11~~	~~13~~	~~(Sweden) Joachim Johansson~~	1,625	5	0	1,620	Withdrew due to an elbow injury
12	12	(Russia) Nikolay Davydenko	1,640	5	450	2,085	Semifinals lost to (Argentina) Mariano Puerta
13	14	(Croatia) Ivan Ljubičić	1,465	35	5	1,435	First round lost to (Argentina) Mariano Puerta
14	15	(Spain) Carlos Moyá	1,430	250	150	1,330	Fourth round lost to (Switzerland) Roger Federer [1]
15	16	(Spain) Tommy Robredo	1,415	150	250	1,515	Quarterfinals lost to (Russia) Nikolay Davydenko [12]
16	17	(Czech Republic) Radek Štěpánek	1,415	5	75	1,495	Third round lost to (France) Sébastien Grosjean [23]
17	20	(Slovakia) Dominik Hrbatý	1,291	35	5	1,261	First round lost to (Serbia and Montenegro) Janko Tipsarević
18	18	(Croatia) Mario Ančić	1,315	75	75	1,315	Third round lost to (Argentina) David Nalbandian [10]
19	19	(Sweden) Thomas Johansson	1,313	(25)^{†}	35	1,323	Second round lost to (Spain) David Sánchez
20	21	(Spain) David Ferrer	1,225	35	250	1,440	Quarterfinals lost to (Spain) Rafael Nadal [4]
21	22	(Germany) Tommy Haas	1,215	5	75	1,295	Third round lost to (Russia) Nikolay Davydenko [12]
22	23	(Chile) Nicolás Massú	1,205	75	5	1,135	First round lost to (Switzerland) Stanislas Wawrinka [Q]
23	24	(France) Sébastien Grosjean	1,200	35	150	1,315	Fourth lost to (Spain) Rafael Nadal [4]
24	25	(Spain) Feliciano López	1,200	150	5	1,055	First round lost to (France) Paul-Henri Mathieu
25	26	(Chile) Fernando González	1,200	5	75	1,270	Third round lost to (Switzerland) Roger Federer [1]
26	27	(Spain) Jiří Novák	1,185	35	35	1,185	Second round lost to (Spain) Félix Mantilla
27	34	(Italy) Filippo Volandri	990	5	75	1,065	Third round retired against (Argentina) José Acasuso
28	28	(Germany) Nicolas Kiefer	1,130	35	150	1,245	Fourth round withdrew due to a neck injury
29	30	(Russia) Mikhail Youzhny	1,095	75	35	1,055	Second round lost to (Austria) Jürgen Melzer
30	31	(France) Richard Gasquet	1,050	5	75	1,120	Third round lost to (Spain) Rafael Nadal [4]
31	32	(Argentina) Juan Ignacio Chela	1,015	250	35	800	Second round lost to (Romania) Victor Hănescu
32	33	(Spain) Juan Carlos Ferrero	995	35	75	1,035	Third round lost to (Russia) Marat Safin [3]
33	35	(Sweden) Robin Söderling	955	5	35	985	Second round lost to (South Korea) Lee Hyung-taik

† The player did not qualify the tournament in 2004. Accordingly, this was the points from the 18th best result are deducted instead.

The following players would have been seeded, but they withdrew from the event.

Rank	Player	Points before	Points defending	Points after	Withdrawal reason
2	(Australia) Lleyton Hewitt	3,935	250	3,685	Rib injury
29	(United States) Taylor Dent	1,100	5	1,095	Ankle injury

=== Women's singles ===
1.	Lindsay Davenport (United States)	lost to	[21] Mary Pierce (France)	Quarterfinal
2.	Maria Sharapova (Russia)	lost to	[10] Justine Henin-Hardenne (Belgium)	Quarterfinal
3.	Amélie Mauresmo (France)	lost to	[29] Ana Ivanovic (Serbia and Montenegro)	3rd round
4.	Elena Dementieva (Russia)	lost to	[16] Elena Likhovtseva (Russia)	4th round
5.	Anastasia Myskina (Russia)	lost to	María Sánchez Lorenzo (Spain)	1st round

== Wildcard entries ==
Below are the lists of the wildcard awardees entering in the main draws.

=== Men's singles wildcard entries ===
1. (France) Thierry Ascione
2. (France) Arnaud Clément
3. (Australia) Peter Luczak
4. (France) Gaël Monfils
5. (France) Olivier Patience
6. (France) Florent Serra
7. (France) Gilles Simon
8. (France) Jo-Wilfried Tsonga

=== Women's singles wildcard entries ===
1. (France) Mailyne Andrieux
2. (France) Alizé Cornet
3. (France) Youlia Fedossova
4. (Australia) Sophie Ferguson
5. (France) Mathilde Johansson
6. (France) Pauline Parmentier
7. (France) Camille Pin
8. (France) Aravane Rezaï

=== Men's doubles wildcard entries ===
1. (France) Thierry Ascione / (France) Jean-René Lisnard
2. (France) Grégory Carraz / (France) Antony Dupuis
3. (France) Jérémy Chardy / (France) Nicolas Renavand
4. (France) Nicolas Devilder / (France) Marc Gicquel
5. (France) Jérôme Haehnel / (France) Florent Serra
6. (France) Olivier Mutis / (France) Olivier Patience
7. (France) Édouard Roger-Vasselin / (France) Gilles Simon

=== Women's doubles wildcard entries ===
1. (France) Mailyne Andrieux / (France) Pauline Parmentier
2. (France) Séverine Beltrame / (France) Camille Pin
3. (France) Kildine Chevalier / (France) Stéphanie Foretz
4. (France) Youlia Fedossova / (France) Violette Huck
5. (France) Florence Haring / (France) Virginie Pichet
6. (France) Mathilde Johansson / (France) Aurélie Védy
7. (United States) Martina Navratilova / (Spain) Arantxa Sánchez Vicario

=== Mixed doubles wildcard entries ===
1. (France) Séverine Beltrame / (France) Michaël Llodra
2. (France) Alizé Cornet / (France) Gaël Monfils
3. (France) Stéphanie Foretz / (France) Nicolas Devilder
4. (France) Émilie Loit / (France) Jean-François Bachelot
5. (France) Camille Pin / (France) Arnaud Clément
6. (France) Sandrine Testud / (France) Marc Gicquel

== Qualifier entries ==
=== Men's qualifiers entries ===
1. (Croatia) Saša Tuksar
2. (Switzerland) Stan Wawrinka
3. (Germany) Tomas Behrend
4. (Finland) Jarkko Nieminen
5. (Czech Republic) Lukáš Dlouhý
6. (Spain) Daniel Gimeno Traver
7. (Spain) Fernando Vicente
8. (France) Antony Dupuis
9. (Czech Republic) Robin Vik
10. (Brazil) Marcos Daniel
11. (Israel) Dudi Sela
12. (Italy) Tomas Tenconi
13. (United States) James Blake
14. (Australia) Chris Guccione
15. (Serbia and Montenegro) Novak Djokovic
16. (Belgium) Kristof Vliegen

The following players received entry into a lucky loser spot:

1. (Italy) Daniele Bracciali
2. (Belgium) Dick Norman
3. (Brazil) Flávio Saretta
4. (Argentina) Juan Pablo Brzezicki
5. (United States) Hugo Armando

=== Women's qualifiers entries ===
1. (United States) Meilen Tu
2. (Sweden) Sofia Arvidsson
3. (Argentina) Clarisa Fernández
4. (Germany) Sandra Klösel
5. (Hungary) Petra Mandula
6. (Netherlands) Michaëlla Krajicek
7. (Czech Republic) Eva Birnerová
8. (Austria) Yvonne Meusburger
9. (Bosnia and Herzegovina) Mervana Jugić-Salkić
10. (Czech Republic) Libuše Průšová
11. (Belarus) Anastasiya Yakimova
12. (Italy) Mara Santangelo

The following player received entry into a lucky loser spot:

1. (Czech Republic) Lucie Šafářová

== Withdrawals ==
Men's singles

- (Argentina) Agustín Calleri → replaced by (Spain) David Sánchez
- (United States) Taylor Dent → replaced by (Italy) Daniele Bracciali
- (Australia) Lleyton Hewitt → replaced by (Belgium) Dick Norman
- (Sweden) Joachim Johansson → replaced by (Brazil) Flávio Saretta
- (Argentina) Edgardo Massa → replaced by (Australia) Scott Draper
- (Netherlands) Sjeng Schalken → replaced by (United States) Hugo Armando
- (Italy) Potito Starace → replaced by (Argentina) Juan Pablo Brzezicki
- (Netherlands) Martin Verkerk → replaced by (Sweden) Thomas Enqvist
- (Argentina) Mariano Zabaleta → replaced by (France) Julien Benneteau

Women's singles

- (China) Li Na → replaced by (Australia) Evie Dominikovic
- (Australia) Alicia Molik → replaced by (Croatia) Silvija Talaja
- (United States) Serena Williams → replaced by (Czech Republic) Lucie Šafářová

== Official videogame ==
An official videogame for the tournament, Roland Garros 2005: Powered by Smash Court Tennis, was launched exclusively for the PlayStation 2 platform. The game, which is an updated version of Smash Court Tennis Pro Tournament 2, featured 15 licensed players and 4 official courts of the tournament: Court Philippe Chatrier, Court Suzanne Lenglen, Court 1 and Court 2.

Preceded by 2005 Australian Open	Grand Slams	Succeeded by 2005 Wimbledon Championships
