= 2005 French Open – Women's doubles =

Women's doubles
- 2005 French Open

Final
- Champion: (Spain) Virginia Ruano Pascual (Argentina) Paola Suárez
- Runner-up: (Zimbabwe) Cara Black (South Africa) Liezel Huber
- Score: 4–6, 6–3, 6–3

Details
- Draw: 64 (7WC)
- Seeds: 16

Events
Singles	men	women		boys	girls
Doubles	men	women	mixed	boys	girls
WC Singles	men	women	quad
WC Doubles	men	women	quad
Legends	−45	45+	women
- French Open

Virginia Ruano Pascual and Paola Suárez were the defending champions, and successfully defended their title, defeating Cara Black and Liezel Huber in the final 4–6, 6–3, 6–3. Cara Black would fail to complete the career grand slam in women's doubles because of this loss

== Seeds ==
1. (Spain) Virginia Ruano Pascual/ (Argentina) Paola Suárez (champions)
2. (Zimbabwe) Cara Black/ (South Africa) Liezel Huber (finals)
3. (United States) Lisa Raymond/ (Australia) Rennae Stubbs (quarterfinals)
4. (Russia) Elena Likhovtseva/ (Russia) Vera Zvonareva (third round)
5. (Russia) Nadia Petrova/ (United States) Meghann Shaughnessy (semifinals)
6. (Spain) Conchita Martínez/ (Slovakia) Janette Husárová (third round)
7. (Slovakia) Daniela Hantuchová/ (Japan) Ai Sugiyama (second round)
8. (United States) Corina Morariu/ (Switzerland) Patty Schnyder (semifinals)
9. (Spain) Anabel Medina Garrigues/ (Russia) Dinara Safina (second round)
10. (Australia) Bryanne Stewart/ (Australia) Samantha Stosur (third round)
11. (Argentina) Gisela Dulko/ (Venezuela) María Vento-Kabchi (second round)
12. (France) Émilie Loit/ (Australia) Nicole Pratt (quarterfinals)
13. (Japan) Shinobu Asagoe/ (Slovenia) Katarina Srebotnik (quarterfinals)
14. (France) Marion Bartoli/ (Germany) Anna-Lena Grönefeld (third round)
15. (Czech Republic) Iveta Benešová/ (Czech Republic) Květa Peschke (third round)
16. (China) Yan Zi/ (China) Zheng Jie (third round)

== Draw ==
Key

- Q = Qualifier
- WC = Wild card
- LL = Lucky loser
- Alt = Alternate
- ITF = ITF entry
- PR = Protected ranking
- SR = Special ranking
- SE = Special exempt
- JE = Junior exempt
- JR = Junior Accelerator Programme entrant
- CO = College Accelerator Programme entrant
- NG = Next Gen Accelerator Program entrant
- w/o = Walkover
- r = Retired
- d = Defaulted

=== Finals ===
Semifinals
1	(Spain) Virginia Ruano Pascual (Argentina) Paola Suárez	6	6
5	(Russia) Nadia Petrova (United States) Meghann Shaughnessy	2	4
8	(United States) Corina Morariu (Switzerland) Patty Schnyder	4	2
2	(Zimbabwe) Cara Black (South Africa) Liezel Huber	6	6

Finals
1	(Spain) Virginia Ruano Pascual (Argentina) Paola Suárez	4	6	6
2	(Zimbabwe) Cara Black (South Africa) Liezel Huber	6	3	3

=== Top half ===
==== Section 1 ====
First round
1	(Spain) V Ruano Pascual (Argentina) P Suárez	6	6
(United States) J Hopkins (United States) M Washington	4	3
(Russia) A Jidkova (Ukraine) T Perebiynis	7^{11}	3	4
(Czech Republic) G Navrátilová (Czech Republic) M Paštiková	6^{9}	6	6
(Luxembourg) A Kremer (Italy) A Serra Zanetti	1	0
(Russia) E Bovina (Russia) E Dementieva	6	6
(Slovakia) L Cervanová (Czech Republic) K Koukalová	3	2
15	(Czech Republic) I Benešová (Czech Republic) K Peschke	6	6
12	(France) É Loit (Australia) N Pratt	6	6
(South Korea) Cho YJ (Japan) A Morigami	3	4
(Serbia and Montenegro) A Ivanovic (Slovenia) T Križan	4	2
(France) S Cohen-Aloro (Tunisia) S Sfar	6	6
(Czech Republic) E Birnerová (Romania) A Vanc	6	6
WC	(France) M Johansson (France) A Védy	1	3
(United States) J Russell (Italy) M Santangelo	3	1
7	(Slovakia) D Hantuchová (Japan) A Sugiyama	6	6

Second round
1	(Spain) V Ruano Pascual (Argentina) P Suárez	6	6
(Czech Republic) G Navrátilová (Czech Republic) M Paštiková	2	2
(Russia) E Bovina (Russia) E Dementieva	2	1
15	(Czech Republic) I Benešová (Czech Republic) K Peschke	6	6
12	(France) É Loit (Australia) N Pratt	6^{4}	6	11
(France) S Cohen-Aloro (Tunisia) S Sfar	7^{7}	3	9
(Czech Republic) E Birnerová (Romania) A Vanc	6	3	6
7	(Slovakia) D Hantuchová (Japan) A Sugiyama	3	6	1

Third round
1	(Spain) V Ruano Pascual (Argentina) P Suárez	6	6
15	(Czech Republic) I Benešová (Czech Republic) K Peschke	1	2
12	(France) É Loit (Australia) N Pratt	6	4	6
(Czech Republic) E Birnerová (Romania) A Vanc	4	6	1

Quarterfinals
1	(Spain) V Ruano Pascual (Argentina) P Suárez	6	4	6
12	(France) É Loit (Australia) N Pratt	4	6	4

==== Section 2 ====
First round
4	(Russia) E Likhovtseva (Russia) V Zvonareva	6	6
(Chinese Taipei) J Lee (China) Peng S	4	3
WC	(France) S Beltrame (France) C Pin	6	3	3
(Colombia) C Castano (Ukraine) Y Fedak	3	6	6
(Switzerland) E Gagliardi (Serbia and Montenegro) J Janković	4	3
(Spain) M Marrero (Spain) A Parra Santonja	6	6
(United States) L Lee-Waters (Australia) L McShea	2	6	9
13	(Japan) S Asagoe (Slovenia) K Srebotnik	6	1	11
11	(Argentina) G Dulko (Venezuela) M Vento-Kabchi	3	6	6
(France) T Golovin (Russia) A Myskina	6	0	2
WC	(United States) M Navratilova (Spain) A Sánchez Vicario	4	6	3
(Spain) L Domínguez Lino (Spain) N Llagostera Vives	6	3	6
(Italy) M Elena Camerin (Italy) T Garbin	4	6	6
(Madagascar) D Randriantefy (Israel) A Smashnova	6	0	1
(Belgium) E Callens (Greece) E Daniilidou	3	2
5	(Russia) N Petrova (United States) M Shaughnessy	6	6

Second round
4	(Russia) E Likhovtseva (Russia) V Zvonareva	6	6
(Colombia) C Castano (Ukraine) Y Fedak	1	4
(Spain) M Marrero (Spain) A Parra Santonja	2	1
13	(Japan) S Asagoe (Slovenia) K Srebotnik	6	6
11	(Argentina) G Dulko (Venezuela) M Vento-Kabchi	5	2
(Spain) L Domínguez Lino (Spain) N Llagostera Vives	7	6
(Italy) M Elena Camerin (Italy) T Garbin	3	4
5	(Russia) N Petrova (United States) M Shaughnessy	6	6

Third round
4	(Russia) E Likhovtseva (Russia) V Zvonareva	2	4
13	(Japan) S Asagoe (Slovenia) K Srebotnik	6	6
(Spain) L Domínguez Lino (Spain) N Llagostera Vives	4	1
5	(Russia) N Petrova (United States) M Shaughnessy	6	6

Quarterfinals
13	(Japan) S Asagoe (Slovenia) K Srebotnik	6	3	2
5	(Russia) N Petrova (United States) M Shaughnessy	2	6	6

=== Bottom half ===
==== Section 3 ====
First round
8	(United States) C Morariu (Switzerland) P Schnyder	6	3	6
(France) C Dhenin (France) V Razzano	3	6	1
(United States) J Craybas (Germany) M Weingärtner	1	2
(Italy) S Farina Elia (Italy) F Pennetta	6	6
(Russia) V Dushevina (Czech Republic) B Strýcová	6	6
WC	(France) M Andrieux (France) P Parmentier	2	4
(United States) V King (Venezuela) M Sequera	0	3
10	(Australia) B Stewart (Australia) S Stosur	6	6
14	(France) M Bartoli (Germany) AL Gronefeld	6	6
WC	(France) F Haring (France) V Pichet	1	3
(Japan) R Fujiwara (Thailand) T Tanasugarn	7^{8}	1	1
(Russia) M Kirilenko (Argentina) ME Salerni	6^{6}	6	6
(Poland) M Domachowska (Croatia) S Talaja	5	6	6
(France) S Testud (Italy) R Vinci	7	4	1
(Argentina) M Díaz Oliva (Slovakia) M Suchá	2	3
3	(United States) L Raymond (Australia) R Stubbs	6	6

Second round
8	(United States) C Morariu (Switzerland) P Schnyder	6	6
(Italy) S Farina Elia (Italy) F Pennetta	3	2
(Russia) V Dushevina (Czech Republic) B Strýcová	1	2
10	(Australia) B Stewart (Australia) S Stosur	6	6
14	(France) M Bartoli (Germany) AL Gronefeld	6	4	6
(Russia) M Kirilenko (Argentina) ME Salerni	4	6	2
(Poland) M Domachowska (Croatia) S Talaja
3	(United States) L Raymond (Australia) R Stubbs	w	/	o

Third round
8	(United States) C Morariu (Switzerland) P Schnyder	6	6
10	(Australia) B Stewart (Australia) S Stosur	3	3
14	(France) M Bartoli (Germany) AL Gronefeld	6	4	3
3	(United States) L Raymond (Australia) R Stubbs	4	6	6

Quarterfinals
8	(United States) C Morariu (Switzerland) P Schnyder	6	6
3	(United States) L Raymond (Australia) R Stubbs	4	3

==== Section 4 ====
First round
6	(Slovakia) J Husárová (Spain) C Martínez	4	6	8
WC	(France) K Chevalier (France) S Foretz	6	3	6
(Czech Republic) Z Ondrášková (Czech Republic) R Voráčová	1	3
(Russia) S Kuznetsova (France) M Pierce	6	6
(China) Li T (China) Sun T	6	7^{7}
(Ukraine) Y Beygelzimer (Germany) J Schruff	2	6^{5}
(United States) L Granville (United States) M Irvin	0	2
9	(Spain) A Medina Garrigues (Russia) D Safina	6	6
16	(China) Y Zi (China) Zheng J	6	6
(Czech Republic) D Chládková (Romania) R Dragomir Ilie	1	2
(Puerto Rico) K Brandi (Japan) N Miyagi	2	3
(Russia) A Chakvetadze (India) S Mirza	6	6
(Russia) E Linetskaia (Russia) G Voskoboeva	6	6
WC	(France) Y Fedossova (France) V Huck	4	1
(Croatia) J Kostanić (Luxembourg) C Schaul	2	4
2	(Zimbabwe) C Black (South Africa) L Huber	6	6

Second round
6	(Slovakia) J Husárová (Spain) C Martínez	7^{8}	6
(Russia) S Kuznetsova (France) M Pierce	6^{6}	3
(China) Li T (China) Sun T	6^{7}	7	7
9	(Spain) A Medina Garrigues (Russia) D Safina	7^{9}	5	5
16	(China) Y Zi (China) Zheng J	4	7	6
(Russia) A Chakvetadze (India) S Mirza	6	5	2
(Russia) E Linetskaia (Russia) G Voskoboeva	4	1
2	(Zimbabwe) C Black (South Africa) L Huber	6	6

Third round
6	(Slovakia) J Husárová (Spain) C Martínez	6^{3}	2
(China) Li T (China) Sun T	7^{7}	6
16	(China) Y Zi (China) Zheng J	6	3	2
2	(Zimbabwe) C Black (South Africa) L Huber	3	6	6

Quarterfinals
(China) Li T (China) Sun T	3	4
2	(Zimbabwe) C Black (South Africa) L Huber	6	6
