= Saša Tuksar =

Croatian tennis player (born 1983)

- Country (sports): Croatia
- Residence: Mursko Središće, Croatia
- Born: 12 May 1983 (age 43) Čakovec, Croatia
- Height: 1.80 m (5 ft 11 in)
- Turned pro: 2002
- Retired: 2014
- Plays: Right-handed
- Prize money: $158,262

Singles
- Career record: 1–8
- Career titles: 0; 0 Challenger, 1 Futures
- Highest ranking: No. 153 (15 August 2005)

Grand Slam singles results
- Australian Open: Q2 (2006)
- French Open: 1R (2005, 2006)
- US Open: Q2 (2005)

Doubles
- Career record: 0–1
- Career titles: 0; 0 Challenger, 0 Futures
- Highest ranking: No. 397 (15 January 2007)
- Last updated on: 6 September 2022.

Saša Tuksar (born 12 May 1983) is a former professional tennis player from Croatia.

Tuksar made the second round of the Croatia Open in 2003, beating Albert Montañés, who retired hurt after losing the first set. It would be the only match he won on the ATP Tour.

The Croatian played in two French Opens during his career. He lost to 12th seed Nikolay Davydenko in the first round of the 2005 French Open. The following year he returned to Roland Garros and was drawn up against another Russian, Mikhail Youzhny, who beat him in four sets.

He appeared in two Davis Cup ties for the Croatian team. In 2004 he played in Croatia's World Group play-off with Belgium. He took part in a singles rubber, which he lost to Olivier Rochus, although Croatia would go on to win the tie. Two years later, with Argentina and Croatia locked at 2–2 in their World Group quarter-final, Tuksar played the deciding rubber against Juan Ignacio Chela, filling in for Mario Ančić who had a back injury. He lost in four sets.

In September 2010, Tuksar was involved in a traffic accident in which the other passenger, a young tennis player whom Tuksar had coached, sustained fatal injuries. In November 2011, charges were brought against Tuksar at which time he invoked his right to silence.

== ATP Challenger and ITF Futures finals ==
=== Singles: 5 (1–4) ===
Legend ATP Challenger (0–2) ITF Futures (1–2)	Finals by surface Hard (0–1) Clay (1–3) Grass (0–0) Carpet (0–0)

Result	W–L	Date	Tournament	Tier	Surface	Opponent	Score
Loss	0–1	May 2003	Algeria F3, Algiers	Futures	Clay	(Algeria) Lamine Ouahab	4–6, 2–6
Loss	0–2	Jun 2003	Slovenia F3, Koper	Futures	Clay	(Slovakia) Ladislav Svarc	2–6, 4–6
Win	1–2	Aug 2004	Croatia F4, Čakovec	Futures	Clay	(Spain) Ferran Ventura-Martell	6–1, 6–4
Loss	1–3	Sep 2004	Donetsk, Ukraine	Challenger	Hard	(Switzerland) Marco Chiudinelli	3–6, 2–6
Loss	1–4	Aug 2005	San Marino, San Marino	Challenger	Clay	(Costa Rica) Juan-Antonio Marin	2–6, 4–6
