= Nika Ožegović =

Croatian tennis player

- Country (sports): Croatia
- Residence: Zagreb
- Born: 21 May 1985 (age 41) Zagreb
- Height: 1.70 m (5 ft 7 in)
- Turned pro: 2002
- Retired: 2011
- Plays: Right-handed (two-handed backhand)
- Prize money: $172,521

Singles
- Career record: 226–161
- Career titles: 5 ITF
- Highest ranking: No. 131 (9 July 2007)

Grand Slam singles results
- Australian Open: Q2 (2008)
- French Open: Q1 (2005, 2008)
- Wimbledon: 2R (2007)
- US Open: Q1 (2005, 2007, 2008)

Doubles
- Career record: 43–52
- Career titles: 3 ITF
- Highest ranking: No. 193 (9 October 2006)

Nika Ožegović (Croatian pronunciation: [nǐːka ǒʒeɡoʋitɕ, nî-, - oʒěː-]; born 21 May 1985) is a former professional tennis player from Croatia. In her career, she won eight ITF tournaments, five in singles and three in doubles. Her career-high WTA rankings are 131 in singles and 193 in doubles.

She retired from professional tennis 2011, and had a comeback in September 2014 for only one ITF tournament in Bol, Croatia.

== ITF Circuit finals ==
Legend
$100,000 tournaments
$75,000 tournaments
$50,000 tournaments
$25,000 tournaments
$10,000 tournaments

=== Singles (5–6) ===
Outcome	No.	Date	Tournament	Surface	Opponent	Score
Runner-up	1.	24 November 2002	Zagreb, Croatia	Hard	(Czech Republic) Hana Šromová	2–6, 5–7
Winner	1.	30 March 2003	Athens, Greece	Clay	(Spain) Lourdes Pascual-Rodriguez	6–7^{(4)}, 6–0, 6–2
Runner-up	2.	27 April 2003	Hvar, Croatia	Clay	(Croatia) Lucija Krezelj	6–2, 6–7^{(1)}, 4–6
Winner	2.	31 August 2003	Maribor, Slovenia	Clay	(Czech Republic) Lucie Kriegsmannová	6–0, 6–1
Runner-up	3.	22 February 2004	Capriolo, Italy	Hard	(Finland) Emma Laine	6–7^{(6)}, 7–6^{(4)}, 6–7^{(4)}
Winner	3.	13 February 2005	Redbridge, England	Hard (i)	(United Kingdom) Elena Baltacha	6–0, 6–3
Winner	4.	18 February 2007	Stockholm, Sweden	Hard (i)	(France) Virginie Pichet	6–2, 6–2
Runner-up	4.	18 May 2007	Zagreb, Croatia	Clay	(Hungary) Ágnes Szávay	0–6, 6–7^{(2)}
Winner	5.	29 June 2008	Padua, Italy	Clay	(Kyrgyzstan) Ksenia Palkina	7–5, 6–3
Runner-up	5.	20 July 2009	Les Contamines, France	Hard	(Poland) Patrycja Sanduska	4–6, 0–6
Runner-up	6.	29 August 2009	Velenje, Slovenia	Clay	(Serbia) Aleksandra Krunić	3–6, 1–6

=== Doubles (3–3) ===
Outcome	No.	Date	Tournament	Surface	Partner	Opponents	Score
Runner-up	1.	30 April 2004	Mostar, Bosnia & Herzegovina	Clay	(Serbia and Montenegro) Borka Majstorović	(Australia) Evie Dominikovic (Croatia) Nadja Pavić	4–6, 1–6
Winner	1.	11 September 2005	Madrid, Spain	Hard	(Slovenia) Andreja Klepač	(Republic of Ireland) Kelly Liggan (Netherlands) Seda Noorlander	6–3, 6–3
Runner-up	2.	10 June 2006	Grado, Italy	Clay	(France) Mailyne Andrieux	(United States) Tiffany Dabek (South Africa) Chanelle Scheepers	4–6, 6–4, 6–7^{(3)}
Winner	2.	21 July 2006	Rome, Italy	Clay	(Croatia) Matea Mezak	(Croatia) Darija Jurak (Hungary) Kyra Nagy	6–2, 6–3
Runner-up	3.	28 July 2006	Monteroni d'Arbia, Italy	Clay	(Croatia) Matea Mezak	(Italy) Valentina Sassi (France) Aurélie Védy	7–5, 4–6, 0–6
Winner	3.	16 September 2006	Sofia, Bulgaria	Clay	(Croatia) Matea Mezak	(Montenegro) Danica Krstajić (Slovenia) Maša Zec Peškirič	6–4, 6–3
