= 2005 French Open – Women's singles =

Women's singles
- 2005 French Open

Final
- Champion: (Belgium) Justine Henin-Hardenne
- Runner-up: (France) Mary Pierce
- Score: 6–1, 6–1

Details
- Seeds: 32

Events
Singles	men	women		boys	girls
Doubles	men	women	mixed	boys	girls
WC Singles	men	women	quad
WC Doubles	men	women	quad
Legends	−45	45+	women
- French Open

Justine Henin-Hardenne defeated Mary Pierce in the final, 6–1, 6–1 to win the women's singles tennis title at the 2005 French Open. It was her second French Open title and fourth major title overall. Henin was the second woman in the Open Era to win the title after saving a match point, doing so in the fourth round against Svetlana Kuznetsova (the first to do so being Anastasia Myskina the previous year, against the same opponent in the same round).

Myskina was the defending champion, but lost in the first round to María Sánchez Lorenzo. Myskina became the first French Open champion to lose in the first round of her title defense.

This was the first French Open in which future champion Ana Ivanovic competed in the main draw. In just her second major main draw appearance, she reached the quarterfinals, losing to Nadia Petrova after upsetting third seed Amélie Mauresmo in the third round.

== Seeds ==
1. (United States) Lindsay Davenport (quarterfinals)
2. (Russia) Maria Sharapova (quarterfinals)
3. (France) Amélie Mauresmo (third round)
4. (Russia) Elena Dementieva (fourth round)
5. (Russia) Anastasia Myskina (first round)
6. (Russia) Svetlana Kuznetsova (fourth round)
7. (Russia) Nadia Petrova (semifinals)
8. (Switzerland) Patty Schnyder (fourth round)
9. (Russia) Vera Zvonareva (third round)
10. (Belgium) Justine Henin-Hardenne (champion)
11. (United States) Venus Williams (third round)
12. (Russia) Elena Bovina (fourth round)
13. (France) Nathalie Dechy (third round)
14. (Belgium) Kim Clijsters (fourth round)
15. (Serbia and Montenegro) Jelena Janković (first round)
16. (Russia) Elena Likhovtseva (semifinals)
17. (France) Tatiana Golovin (third round)
18. (Italy) Silvia Farina Elia (third round)
19. (Japan) Shinobu Asagoe (second round)
20. (Slovakia) Daniela Hantuchová (third round)
21. (France) Mary Pierce (final)
22. (Italy) Francesca Schiavone (fourth round)
23. (Japan) Ai Sugiyama (first round)
24. (Bulgaria) Magdalena Maleeva (second round)
25. (Russia) Dinara Safina (first round)
26. (Argentina) Paola Suárez (first round)
27. (United States) Amy Frazier (second round)
28. (France) Marion Bartoli (first round)
29. (Serbia and Montenegro) Ana Ivanovic (quarterfinals)
30. (Argentina) Gisela Dulko (second round)
31. (Croatia) Karolina Šprem (second round)
32. (Italy) Flavia Pennetta (third round)

== Draw ==
Key

- Q = Qualifier
- WC = Wild card
- LL = Lucky loser
- Alt = Alternate
- ITF = ITF entry
- PR = Protected ranking
- SR = Special ranking
- SE = Special exempt
- JE = Junior exempt
- JR = Junior Accelerator Programme entrant
- CO = College Accelerator Programme entrant
- NG = Next Gen Accelerator Program entrant
- w/o = Walkover
- r = Retired
- d = Defaulted

=== Finals ===
Quarterfinals
1	(United States) Lindsay Davenport	3	2
21	(France) Mary Pierce	6	6
16	(Russia) Elena Likhovtseva	2	6	6
(Bulgaria) Sesil Karatantcheva	6	4	4
7	(Russia) Nadia Petrova	6	6
29	(Serbia and Montenegro) Ana Ivanovic	2	2
10	(Belgium) Justine Henin-Hardenne	6	6
2	(Russia) Maria Sharapova	4	2

Semifinals
21	(France) Mary Pierce	6	6
16	(Russia) Elena Likhovtseva	1	1
7	(Russia) Nadia Petrova	2	3
10	(Belgium) Justine Henin-Hardenne	6	6

Final
21	(France) Mary Pierce	1	1
10	(Belgium) Justine Henin-Hardenne	6	6

=== Top half ===
==== Section 1 ====
First round
1	(United States) L Davenport	3	6	6
(Slovenia) K Srebotnik	6	2	2
(China) S Peng	6	6
WC	(France) M Andrieux	0	1
(Russia) T Panova	3	2
Q	(Argentina) C Fernández	6	6
(France) V Razzano	6	6
25	(Russia) D Safina	3	3
20	(Slovakia) D Hantuchová	6	6
Q	(Netherlands) M Krajicek	3	1
(Colombia) C Castaño	6	6
(Czech Republic) D Chládková	1	2
(Slovakia) Ľ Cervanová	4	6	6
(Japan) A Nakamura	6	2	1
Q	(United States) M Tu	1	0
14	(Belgium) K Clijsters	6	6

Second round
1	(United States) L Davenport	3	7^{7}	6
(China) S Peng	6	6^{4}	0
Q	(Argentina) C Fernández	1	1
(France) V Razzano	6	6
20	(Slovakia) D Hantuchová	6	6
(Colombia) C Castaño	4	3
(Slovakia) Ľ Cervanová	2	1
14	(Belgium) K Clijsters	6	6

Third round
1	(United States) L Davenport	7	4	6
(France) V Razzano	5	6	4
20	(Slovakia) D Hantuchová	4	2
14	(Belgium) K Clijsters	6	6

Fourth round
1	(United States) L Davenport	1	7	6
14	(Belgium) K Clijsters	6	5	3

==== Section 2 ====
First round
9	(Russia) V Zvonareva	6	6
Q	(Austria) Y Meusburger	1	3
Q	(Czech Republic) E Birnerová	2	7	6
(Russia) M Kirilenko	6	5	3
(Croatia) J Kostanić	6	6
(Thailand) T Tanasugarn	0	1
(Russia) V Dushevina	2	5
21	(France) M Pierce	6	7
32	(Italy) F Pennetta	6	6
(United States) J Craybas	3	4
(Poland) M Domachowska	6	6
(France) S Cohen-Aloro	3	3
Q	(Germany) S Klösel	7^{7}	6
Q	(Italy) M Santangelo	6^{5}	1
(South Korea) Y-j Cho	3	4
8	(Switzerland) P Schnyder	6	6

Second round
9	(Russia) V Zvonareva	4	6	6
Q	(Czech Republic) E Birnerová	6	3	0
(Croatia) J Kostanić	1	0
21	(France) M Pierce	6	6
32	(Italy) F Pennetta	6	6
(Poland) M Domachowska	4	3
Q	(Germany) S Klösel	2	3
8	(Switzerland) P Schnyder	6	6

Third round
9	(Russia) V Zvonareva	6^{2}	5
21	(France) M Pierce	7^{7}	7
32	(Italy) F Pennetta	6	1	0
8	(Switzerland) P Schnyder	4	6	6

Fourth round
21	(France) M Pierce	6	1	6
8	(Switzerland) P Schnyder	1	6	4

==== Section 3 ====
First round
4	(Russia) E Dementieva	6	6
(Czech Republic) B Strýcová	3	3
(Croatia) S Mamić	6	6
(United States) L Raymond	2	4
(Japan) A Morigami	7	6
(United States) A Haynes	5	4
(Italy) ME Camerin	4	2
31	(Croatia) K Šprem	6	6
18	(Italy) S Farina Elia	7	6
(Luxembourg) A Kremer	5	2
(United States) S Perry	6	3	4
(Spain) A Parra Santonja	3	6	6
WC	(Australia) S Ferguson	4	6	1
(Argentina) M Díaz Oliva	6	3	6
(Ukraine) Y Fedak	6	4	4
16	(Russia) E Likhovtseva	2	6	6

Second round
4	(Russia) E Dementieva	7^{9}	6
(Croatia) S Mamić	6^{7}	2
(Japan) A Morigami	7	6
31	(Croatia) K Šprem	5	3
18	(Italy) S Farina Elia	7	6
(Spain) A Parra Santonja	5	2
(Argentina) M Díaz Oliva	1	6^{3}
16	(Russia) E Likhovtseva	6	7^{7}

Third round
4	(Russia) E Dementieva	6	4	6
(Japan) A Morigami	3	6	3
18	(Italy) S Farina Elia	5	6^{2}
16	(Russia) E Likhovtseva	7	7^{7}

Fourth round
4	(Russia) E Dementieva	6^{3}	7	5
16	(Russia) E Likhovtseva	7^{7}	5	7

==== Section 4 ====
First round
11	(United States) V Williams	6	6
(Spain) M Marrero	3	2
(Colombia) F Zuluaga	6	6
Q	(Czech Republic) L Průšová	1	0
Q	(Ukraine) A Bondarenko	6	5	4
(Bulgaria) S Karatantcheva	4	7	6
(Germany) J Schruff	5	2
19	(Japan) S Asagoe	7	6
27	(United States) A Frazier	7	5	7
(United States) M Shaughnessy	5	7	5
(France) É Loit	6	6
(Luxembourg) C Schaul	3	0
(Ukraine) T Perebiynis	6	3	5
(Switzerland) E Gagliardi	3	6	7
(Spain) M Sánchez Lorenzo	6	4	6
5	(Russia) A Myskina	4	6	0

Second round
11	(United States) V Williams	6	3	6
(Colombia) F Zuluaga	3	6	3
(Bulgaria) S Karatantcheva	7	6
19	(Japan) S Asagoe	5	2
27	(United States) A Frazier	4	4
(France) É Loit	6	6
(Switzerland) E Gagliardi	6	6
(Spain) M Sánchez Lorenzo	3	3

Third round
11	(United States) V Williams	3	6	1
(Bulgaria) S Karatantcheva	6	1	6
(France) É Loit	6	3	3
(Switzerland) E Gagliardi	4	6	6

Fourth round
(Bulgaria) S Karatantcheva	7	6
(Switzerland) E Gagliardi	5	3

=== Bottom half ===
==== Section 5 ====
First round
7	(Russia) N Petrova	6	6
(United States) M Washington	4	2
(United States) A Spears	3	1
(France) S Brémond	6	6
(Czech Republic) K Peschke	6	6
(Madagascar) D Randriantefy	1	0
(Israel) S Pe'er	6	6
28	(France) M Bartoli	4	3
17	(France) T Golovin	6	6
(United States) L Osterloh	0	2
(Italy) A Serra Zanetti	6	6
(Germany) M Weingärtner	2	4
(Italy) T Garbin	6^{8}	6	6
(Slovakia) M Suchá	7^{10}	1	2
(Venezuela) M Vento-Kabchi	0	3
12	(Russia) E Bovina	6	6

Second round
7	(Russia) N Petrova	6	6
(France) S Brémond	1	3
(Czech Republic) K Peschke	1	6	4
(Israel) S Pe'er	6	1	6
17	(France) T Golovin	6	6
(Italy) A Serra Zanetti	0	1
(Italy) T Garbin	1	6	4
12	(Russia) E Bovina	6	1	6

Third round
7	(Russia) N Petrova	6	6
(Israel) S Pe'er	3	1
17	(France) T Golovin	3	5
12	(Russia) E Bovina	6	7

Fourth round
7	(Russia) N Petrova	7	3	6
12	(Russia) E Bovina	5	6	4

==== Section 6 ====
First round
15	(Serbia and Montenegro) J Janković	0	3
(Israel) A Smashnova	6	6
(Italy) R Vinci	5	6	4
(Germany) A-L Grönefeld	7	1	6
LL	(Czech Republic) L Šafářová	6	0	4
(Czech Republic) N Vaidišová	4	6	6
(China) J Zheng	3	6	4
22	(Italy) F Schiavone	6	3	6
29	(Serbia and Montenegro) A Ivanovic	6	6
(France) S Foretz	3	3
(Czech Republic) I Benešová	7	6
WC	(France) P Parmentier	5	4
(Russia) A Jidkova	6^{4}	3
WC	(France) A Cornet	7^{7}	6
(Australia) E Dominikovic	2	1
3	(France) A Mauresmo	6	6

Second round
(Israel) A Smashnova	1	0
(Germany) A-L Grönefeld	6	6
(Czech Republic) N Vaidišová	2	6^{5}
22	(Italy) F Schiavone	6	7^{7}
29	(Serbia and Montenegro) A Ivanovic	6	6
(Czech Republic) I Benešová	3	1
WC	(France) A Cornet	0	2
3	(France) A Mauresmo	6	6

Third round
(Germany) A-L Grönefeld	6^{3}	5
22	(Italy) F Schiavone	7^{7}	7
29	(Serbia and Montenegro) A Ivanovic	6	3	6
3	(France) A Mauresmo	4	6	4

Fourth round
22	(Italy) F Schiavone	4	7^{7}	3
29	(Serbia and Montenegro) A Ivanovic	6	6^{3}	6

==== Section 7 ====
First round
6	(Russia) S Kuznetsova	6	6
WC	(France) M Johansson	1	1
Q	(Sweden) S Arvidsson	6	7^{7}
(Greece) E Daniilidou	1	6^{1}
(United States) M Irvin	5	6	8
(Australia) N Pratt	7	4	6
(India) S Mirza	3	3
30	(Argentina) G Dulko	6	6
24	(Bulgaria) M Maleeva	6	6
(Japan) R Fujiwara	4	2
Q	(Hungary) P Mandula	0	1
(Spain) A Medina Garrigues	6	6
(Spain) V Ruano Pascual	6	7^{9}
Q	(Belarus) A Yakimova	4	6^{7}
(Spain) C Martínez	0	6	4
10	(Belgium) J Henin-Hardenne	6	4	6

Second round
6	(Russia) S Kuznetsova	6	6
Q	(Sweden) S Arvidsson	3	4
(United States) M Irvin	6	7
30	(Argentina) G Dulko	4	5
24	(Bulgaria) M Maleeva	3	4
(Spain) A Medina Garrigues	6	6
(Spain) V Ruano Pascual	1	4
10	(Belgium) J Henin-Hardenne	6	6

Third round
6	(Russia) S Kuznetsova	6	2	6
(United States) M Irvin	1	6	0
(Spain) A Medina Garrigues	6	2	3
10	(Belgium) J Henin-Hardenne	4	6	6

Fourth round
6	(Russia) S Kuznetsova	6^{6}	6	5
10	(Belgium) J Henin-Hardenne	7^{8}	4	7

==== Section 8 ====
First round
13	(France) N Dechy	6	6
(Czech Republic) M Paštiková	1	4
(Croatia) S Talaja	1	2
(Australia) S Stosur	6	6
(Puerto Rico) K Brandi	1	6	6
WC	(France) Y Fedossova	6	3	2
(Spain) N Llagostera Vives	6	4	6
23	(Japan) A Sugiyama	3	6	4
27	(Argentina) P Suárez	5	6	0
(Russia) A Chakvetadze	7	1	6
Q	(Bosnia and Herzegovina) M Jugić-Salkić	3	6	3
(Czech Republic) K Koukalová	6	4	6
WC	(France) A Rezaï	2	6	6
WC	(France) C Pin	6	2	2
(Russia) E Linetskaia	7^{7}	2	4
2	(Russia) M Sharapova	6^{3}	6	6

Second round
13	(France) N Dechy	6	6
(Australia) S Stosur	3	3
(Puerto Rico) K Brandi	6^{2}	0
(Spain) N Llagostera Vives	7^{7}	6
(Russia) A Chakvetadze	6	6
(Czech Republic) K Koukalová	4	3
WC	(France) A Rezaï	3	2
2	(Russia) M Sharapova	6	6

Third round
13	(France) N Dechy	6^{1}	3
(Spain) N Llagostera Vives	7^{7}	6
(Russia) A Chakvetadze	1	4
2	(Russia) M Sharapova	6	6

Fourth round
(Spain) N Llagostera Vives	2	3
2	(Russia) M Sharapova	6	6

== Championship match statistics ==
Category	(Belgium) Henin-Hardenne	(France) Pierce
1st serve %	24/46 (52%)	33/53 (62%)
1st serve points won	20 of 24 = 83%	15 of 33 = 45%
2nd serve points won	11 of 22 = 50%	5 of 20 = 25%
Total service points won	31 of 46 = 67.39%	20 of 53 = 37.74%
Aces	2	1
Double faults	3	5
Winners	20	15
Unforced errors	15	29
Net points won	6 of 6 = 100%	4 of 10 = 40%
Break points converted	5 of 8 = 63%	0 of 1 = 0%
Return points won	33 of 53 = 62%	15 of 46 = 33%
Total points won	64	35
Source (Note: The statistics in the source aren't perfect, as this source and others do not include the double fault points as points won by the opponent. This has been rectified by myself personally. Also: the calculation for Henin's first serve percentage is wrong in this source.)

Preceded by 2005 Australian Open – Women's singles	Grand Slam women's singles	Succeeded by 2005 Wimbledon Championships – Women's singles
