= 2005 French Open – Boys' singles =

Boys' single tournament

Boys' singles
- 2005 French Open

Final
- Champion: (Croatia) Marin Čilić
- Runner-up: (Netherlands) Antal van der Duim
- Score: 6–3, 6–1

Events
Singles	men	women		boys	girls
Doubles	men	women	mixed	boys	girls
WC Singles	men	women	quad
WC Doubles	men	women	quad
Legends	−45	45+	women
← 2004 ·	French Open	· 2006 →

The 2005 French Open boys' singles tournament was an event during the 2005 French Open tennis tournament. Gaël Monfils was the defending champion, but did not compete in the Juniors in this year.

Marin Čilić won in the final 6–3, 6–1, against Antal van der Duim.

== Seeds ==
1. (United Kingdom) Andy Murray (semifinals)
2. (United States) Donald Young (second round)
3. (South Korea) Kim Sun-yong (third round)
4. (Argentina) Leonardo Mayer (first round)
5. (Ukraine) Sergei Bubka (quarterfinals)
6. (Argentina) Juan Martín del Potro (quarterfinals)
7. (Belgium) Niels Desein (first round)
8. (Austria) Andreas Haider-Maurer (first round)
9. (Brazil) Raony Carvalho (second round)
10. (France) Jérémy Chardy (second round)
11. (Czech Republic) Dušan Lojda (first round)
12. (Brazil) André Miele (first round)
13. (Australia) Carsten Ball (second round)
14. (Russia) Evgeny Kirillov (third round)
15. (Venezuela) David Navarrete (first round)
16. (United States) Timothy Neilly (first round)

== Draw ==
=== Key ===
- Q = Qualifier
- WC = Wild card
- LL = Lucky loser
- Alt = Alternate
- SE = Special exempt
- PR = Protected ranking
- ITF = ITF entry
- JE = Junior exempt
- w/o = Walkover
- r = Retired
- d = Defaulted
- SR = Special ranking

=== Finals ===
Quarterfinals
1	(United Kingdom) Andy Murray	6	6
6	(Argentina) Juan Martín del Potro	4	2
(Croatia) Marin Čilić	7^{7}	6
5	(Ukraine) Sergei Bubka	6^{5}	2
(United States) Sam Querrey	7^{7}	3	3
(Slovakia) Lukáš Lacko	6^{5}	6	6
(Netherlands) Antal van der Duim	4	6	6
(Ukraine) Alexandr Dolgopolov	6	4	1

Semifinals
1	(United Kingdom) Andy Murray	5	3
(Croatia) Marin Čilić	7	6
(Slovakia) Lukáš Lacko	4	6	5
(Netherlands) Antal van der Duim	6	4	7

Final
(Croatia) Marin Čilić	6	6
(Netherlands) Antal van der Duim	3	1

=== Top half ===
==== Section 1 ====
First round
1	(United Kingdom) Andy Murray	6	2	6
(Venezuela) Piero Luisi	4	6	3
(United States) Kellen Damico	5	4
WC	(France) Jonathan Dasnières de Veigy	7	6
(Italy) Gianluca Naso	6	6
(India) Sanam Singh	1	3
Q	(United States) Jamie Hunt	0	4
13	(Australia) Carsten Ball	6	6
11	(Czech Republic) Dušan Lojda	3	2
(Canada) Philip Bester	6	6
(United States) Marcus Fugate	5	4
(Russia) Alexander Krasnorutskiy	7	6
(Brazil) Luis Henrique Grangeiro	3	4
Q	(Colombia) Santiago Giraldo	6	6
WC	(France) Alexandre Sidorenko	2	0
6	(Argentina) Juan Martín del Potro	6	6

Second round
1	(United Kingdom) A Murray	6	7^{7}
WC	(France) J Dasnières de Veigy	3	6^{4}
(Italy) G Naso	6	6
13	(Australia) C Ball	2	1
(Canada) P Bester	6	2	2
(Russia) A Krasnorutskiy	3	6	6
Q	(Colombia) S Giraldo	1	4
6	(Argentina) JM del Potro	6	6

Third round
1	(United Kingdom) A Murray	6	6
(Italy) G Naso	2	2
(Russia) A Krasnorutskiy	1	4
6	(Argentina) JM del Potro	6	6

Quarterfinals
1	(United Kingdom) A Murray	6	6
6	(Argentina) JM del Potro	4	2

==== Section 2 ====
First round
3	(South Korea) Kim Sun-yong	6	6
(Switzerland) Robin Roshardt	4	2
(Germany) Jochen Schoettler	6^{6}	7	6
(India) Vivek Shokeen	7^{8}	5	3
(Netherlands) Thiemo de Bakker	4	3
(Croatia) Marin Čilić	6	6
WC	(France) Yannick Thivant	6	6
16	(United States) Timothy Neilly	3	2
9	(Brazil) Raony Carvalho	4	6	6
WC	(France) Adrian Mannarino	6	3	1
Q	(Australia) Andrew Coelho	6	5	4
Q	(United States) Matt Bruch	3	7	6
(Russia) Pavel Chekhov	6	2	0
(Slovakia) Pavol Červenák	3	6	6
(United States) Alex Clayton	4	0
5	(Ukraine) Sergei Bubka	6	6

Second round
3	(South Korea) S-y Kim	7^{9}	4	6
(Germany) J Schoettler	6^{7}	6	3
(Croatia) M Čilić	4	6	6
WC	(France) Y Thivant	6	0	4
9	(Brazil) R Carvalho	6	3	4
Q	(United States) M Bruch	2	6	6
(Slovakia) P Červenák	3	6	2
5	(Ukraine) S Bubka	6	3	6

Third round
3	(South Korea) S-y Kim	1	3
(Croatia) M Čilić	6	6
Q	(United States) M Bruch	6^{6}	2
5	(Ukraine) S Bubka	7^{8}	6

Quarterfinals
(Croatia) M Čilić	7^{7}	6
5	(Ukraine) S Bubka	6^{5}	2

=== Bottom half ===
==== Section 3 ====
First round
8	(Austria) Andreas Haider-Maurer	2	5
Q	(Russia) Valery Rudnev	6	7
Q	(United Kingdom) Andrew Kennaugh	6	6^{2}	6
WC	(France) Jonathan Dahan	3	7^{7}	3
WC	(France) Laurent Rochette	0	4
(United States) Sam Querrey	6	6
Q	(Australia) Todd Ley	6	6
12	(Brazil) André Miele	1	3
15	(Venezuela) David Navarrete	3	1
WC	(Madagascar) Tony Rajaobelina	6	6
(Italy) Andrea Arnaboldi	5	6^{4}
(United States) Jesse Levine	7	7^{7}
(United States) Tim Smyczek	2	1
(Slovakia) Lukáš Lacko	6	6
(Hong Kong) Martin Sayer	6	6
4	(Argentina) Leonardo Mayer	3	4

Second round
Q	(Russia) V Rudnev	2	6^{5}
Q	(United Kingdom) A Kennaugh	6	7^{7}
(United States) S Querrey	6	6
Q	(Australia) T Ley	4	2
WC	(Madagascar) T Rajaobelina	3	4
(United States) J Levine	6	6
(Slovakia) L Lacko	6	6
(Hong Kong) M Sayer	4	2

Third round
Q	(United Kingdom) A Kennaugh	0	0
(United States) S Querrey	6	6
(United States) J Levine	4	6^{5}
(Slovakia) L Lacko	6	7^{7}

Quarterfinals
(United States) S Querrey	7^{7}	3	3
(Slovakia) L Lacko	6^{5}	6	6

==== Section 4 ====
First round
7	(Belgium) Niels Desein	3	4
Q	(Canada) Peter Polansky	6	6
(Switzerland) Alexander Sadecky	4	2
(United States) Michael Shabaz	6	6
(Germany) Aljoscha Thron	5	0
(Netherlands) Antal van der Duim	7	6
(The Bahamas) Ryan Sweeting	2	1
10	(France) Jérémy Chardy	6	6
14	(Russia) Evgeny Kirillov	7^{7}	7^{7}
LL	(Croatia) Petar Jelenić	6^{3}	6^{4}
WC	(France) Boris Obama	4	7	6
LL	(Venezuela) Román Recarte	6	5	2
(Ukraine) Alexandr Dolgopolov	7^{7}	2	6
(India) Jeevan Nedunchezhiyan	6^{4}	6	1
(Kuwait) Abdullah Maqdes	3	3
2	(United States) Donald Young	6	6

Second round
Q	(Canada) P Polansky	7	6
(United States) M Shabaz	5	3
(Netherlands) A van der Duim	3	6	8
10	(France) J Chardy	6	3	6
14	(Russia) E Kirillov	6	6
WC	(France) B Obama	0	4
(Ukraine) A Dolgopolov	4	6	6
2	(United States) D Young	6	2	2

Third round
Q	(Canada) P Polansky	6	5	6
(Netherlands) A van der Duim	4	7	8
14	(Russia) E Kirillov	2	4
(Ukraine) A Dolgopolov	6	6

Quarterfinals
(Netherlands) A van der Duim	4	6	6
(Ukraine) A Dolgopolov	6	4	1

== Sources ==
- ITF Tennis
