= Mailyne Andrieux =

French tennis player

- Country (sports): France
- Born: December 1, 1987 (age 38)
- Turned pro: 2003
- Retired: 2008
- Plays: Right-handed
- Prize money: US$55,749

Singles
- Career record: 91–81
- Career titles: 0, 1 ITF
- Highest ranking: No. 271 (16 October 2006)

Grand Slam singles results
- French Open: 1R (2005)

Doubles
- Career record: 30–29
- Career titles: 0, 2 ITF
- Highest ranking: No. 301 (2 October 2006)

Grand Slam doubles results
- French Open: 1R (2005)

Mailyne Andrieux (born 1 December 1987) is a retired French professional tennis player.

== Career ==
During her career she won one ITF singles and two ITF doubles titles. In the Grand Slam tournaments she achieved her best results reaching the first round in singles and doubles at the French Open in 2005.

== ITF Circuit finals ==
=== Singles (1–0) ===
$100,000 tournaments $75,000 tournaments $50,000 tournaments $25,000 tournaments $10,000 tournaments	Titles by surface Hard (0–0) Grass (0–0) Clay (1–0) Carpet (0–0)

Outcome	No.	Date	Tournament	Surface	Opponent	Score
Winner	1.	Nov 2004	Le Havre, France	Clay	(Czech Republic) Janette Bejlková	6–3, 6–1

=== Doubles (2–1) ===
$100,000 tournaments $75,000 tournaments $50,000 tournaments $25,000 tournaments $10,000 tournaments	Titles by surface Hard (1–0) Grass (0–0) Clay (1–1) Carpet (0–0)

Outcome	No.	Date	Tournament	Surface	Partner	Opponent	Score
Winner	1.	Nov 2004	Le Havre, France	Clay	(France) Kildine Chevalier	(Russia) Maria Arkhipova (Czech Republic) Janette Bejlková	7–5, 6–7^{(2–7)}, 6–4
Winner	2.	Oct 2005	Nantes, France	Hard	(Czech Republic) Renata Voráčová	(Canada) Marie-Ève Pelletier (France) Aurélie Védy	6–7^{(3–7)}, 7–5, 6–2
Runner-up	1.	Jul 2006	Grado, Italy	Clay	(Croatia) Nika Ožegović	(United States) Tiffany Dabek (South Africa) Chanelle Scheepers	4–6, 6–4, 6–7^{(3–7)}
