= 2005 French Open – Men's doubles =

Men's doubles
- 2005 French Open

Final
- Champion: (Sweden) Jonas Björkman (Belarus) Max Mirnyi
- Runner-up: (United States) Bob Bryan (United States) Mike Bryan
- Score: 2–6, 6–1, 6–4

Details
- Draw: 64
- Seeds: 16

Events
Singles	men	women		boys	girls
Doubles	men	women	mixed	boys	girls
WC Singles	men	women	quad
WC Doubles	men	women	quad
Legends	−45	45+	women
← 2004 ·	French Open	· 2006 →

Xavier Malisse and Olivier Rochus were the defending champions, but lost in the third round against third seeds and eventual finalists Bob & Mike Bryan.

Jonas Björkman and Max Mirnyi defeated The Bryans in the final to win the title, it was their first title as a team. With the victory, Björkman completed the Career Grand Slam, having won the three other Major tournaments previously.

== Seeds ==
The seeded teams are listed below. Jonas Björkman and Max Mirnyi are the champions; others show the round in which they were eliminated.

1. (The Bahamas) Mark Knowles/ (Canada) Daniel Nestor (semifinals)
2. (Sweden) Jonas Björkman/ (Belarus) Max Mirnyi (champions)
3. (United States) Bob Bryan/ (United States) Mike Bryan (finals)
4. (India) Mahesh Bhupathi/ (Australia) Todd Woodbridge (first round)
5. (Zimbabwe) Wayne Black/ (Zimbabwe) Kevin Ullyett (first round)
6. (India) Leander Paes/ (Serbia and Montenegro) Nenad Zimonjić (quarterfinals)
7. (France) Michaël Llodra/ (France) Fabrice Santoro (second round)
8. (Australia) Wayne Arthurs/ (Australia) Paul Hanley (quarterfinals)
9. (Sweden) Simon Aspelin/ (Australia) Todd Perry (third round)
10. (Czech Republic) František Čermák/ (Czech Republic) Leoš Friedl (third round)
11. (Czech Republic) Cyril Suk/ (Czech Republic) Pavel Vízner (second round)
12. (Czech Republic) Martin Damm/ (Argentina) Mariano Hood (quarterfinals)
13. (Belgium) Xavier Malisse/ (Belgium) Olivier Rochus (third round)
14. N/A
15. (Argentina) Gastón Etlis/ (Argentina) Martín Rodríguez (second round)
16. (Switzerland) Yves Allegro/ (Germany) Michael Kohlmann (second round)

== Draw ==
=== Key ===
- Q = Qualifier
- WC = Wild card
- LL = Lucky loser
- Alt = Alternate
- ITF = ITF entry
- PR = Protected ranking
- SR = Special ranking
- SE = Special exempt
- JE = Junior exempt
- JR = Junior Accelerator Programme entrant
- CO = College Accelerator Programme entrant
- NG = Next Gen Accelerator Program entrant
- w/o = Walkover
- r = Retired
- d = Defaulted

=== Finals ===
Semifinals
1	(The Bahamas) Mark Knowles (Canada) Daniel Nestor	3	2^{r}
3	(United States) Bob Bryan (United States) Mike Bryan	6	3
(Chile) Fernando González (Chile) Nicolás Massú	3	6	4
2	(Sweden) Jonas Björkman (Belarus) Max Mirnyi	6	4	6

Finals
3	(United States) Bob Bryan (United States) Mike Bryan	6	1	4
2	(Sweden) Jonas Björkman (Belarus) Max Mirnyi	2	6	6

=== Top half ===
==== Section 1 ====
First round
1	(The Bahamas) M Knowles (Canada) D Nestor	6	7^{7}
Alt.	(Sweden) R Lindstedt (Belgium) T Vanhoudt	2	6^{5}
(Czech Republic) T Cibulec (Poland) M Fyrstenberg	6	6
(Luxembourg) G Müller (Belgium) C Rochus	3	3
(Italy) G Galimberti (Thailand) P Srichaphan	6	6^{1}	9
(United States) G Oliver (United States) J Palmer	4	7^{7}	7
WC	(France) O Mutis (France) O Patience	3	3
15	(Argentina) G Etlis (Argentina) M Rodríguez	6	6
12	(Czech Republic) M Damm (Argentina) M Hood	3	6	6
(Czech Republic) J Novák (Czech Republic) Pála	6	3	4
(Italy) E Artoni (Argentina) M Puerta	6	4	6
(Spain) Á Calatrava (Brazil) R Mello	2	6	8
(Denmark) K Carlsen (Croatia) I Karlović	6	1	8
(Poland) M Matkowski (Germany) A Waske	3	6	10
(Italy) D Sanguinetti (Armenia) S Sargsian	0	3
7	(France) M Llodra (France) F Santoro	6	6

Second round
1	(The Bahamas) M Knowles (Canada) D Nestor	6	6
(Czech Republic) T Cibulec (Poland) M Fyrstenberg	4	3
(Italy) G Galimberti (Thailand) P Srichaphan	6	6
15	(Argentina) G Etlis (Argentina) M Rodríguez	3	4
12	(Czech Republic) M Damm (Argentina) M Hood	6	6
(Spain) Á Calatrava (Brazil) R Mello	4	3
(Poland) M Matkowski (Germany) A Waske	1	6	6
7	(France) M Llodra (France) F Santoro	6	3	3

Third round
1	(The Bahamas) M Knowles (Canada) D Nestor	6	6
(Italy) G Galimberti (Thailand) P Srichaphan	2	2
12	(Czech Republic) M Damm (Argentina) M Hood	3	6	6
(Poland) M Matkowski (Germany) A Waske	6	4	4

Quarterfinals
1	(The Bahamas) M Knowles (Canada) D Nestor	7^{7}	3	6
12	(Czech Republic) M Damm (Argentina) M Hood	6^{2}	6	1

==== Section 2 ====
First round
3	(United States) B Bryan (United States) M Bryan	7^{9}	5	7
(Spain) D Ferrer (Spain) S Ventura	6^{7}	7	5
(Germany) R Schüttler (Russia) M Youzhny	6	3	6
(Spain) F López (Spain) F Verdasco	3	6	4
(United States) R Leach (United States) T Parrot	4	4
WC	(France) G Carraz (France) A Dupuis	6	6
(Slovakia) D Hrbatý (Brazil) A Sá	6	2	1
13	(Belgium) X Malisse (Belgium) O Rochus	1	6	6
10	(Czech Republic) F Čermák (Czech Republic) L Friedl	7	6
(United States) R Ginepri (United States) B MacPhie	5	2
(Czech Republic) P Luxa (Czech Republic) D Rikl	0	0
(Argentina) JP Brzezicki (Argentina) JI Chela	6	6
(Australia) J Kerr (Argentina) S Prieto	6	5	9
WC	(France) N Devilder (France) M Gicquel	4	7	11
(Germany) F Mayer (Netherlands) R Wassen	3	6	2
6	(India) L Paes (Serbia and Montenegro) N Zimonjić	6	4	6

Second round
3	(United States) B Bryan (United States) M Bryan	6	6
(Germany) R Schüttler (Russia) M Youzhny	1	4
WC	(France) G Carraz (France) A Dupuis	4	4
13	(Belgium) X Malisse (Belgium) O Rochus	6	6
10	(Czech Republic) F Čermák (Czech Republic) L Friedl	4	6	6
(Argentina) JP Brzezicki (Argentina) JI Chela	6	1	2
WC	(France) N Devilder (France) M Gicquel	1	3
6	(India) L Paes (Serbia and Montenegro) N Zimonjić	6	6

Third round
3	(United States) B Bryan (United States) M Bryan	7^{8}	6
13	(Belgium) X Malisse (Belgium) O Rochus	6^{6}	4
10	(Czech Republic) F Čermák (Czech Republic) L Friedl	6^{5}	4
6	(India) L Paes (Serbia and Montenegro) N Zimonjić	7^{7}	6

Quarterfinals
3	(United States) B Bryan (United States) M Bryan	7^{7}	6
6	(India) L Paes (Serbia and Montenegro) N Zimonjić	6^{5}	4

=== Bottom half ===
==== Section 3 ====
First round
5	(Zimbabwe) W Black (Zimbabwe) K Ullyett	5	6	2
(Austria) J Knowle (Austria) J Melzer	7	3	6
(France) PH Mathieu (France) C Saulnier	6^{5}	1
(Italy) M Bertolini (Italy) F Volandri	7^{7}	6
(Romania) V Hănescu (Czech Republic) J Hernych	2	4
(Argentina) L Arnold Ker (Argentina) M García	6	6
(France) R Gasquet (France) G Monfils	4	3
11	(Czech Republic) C Suk (Czech Republic) P Vízner	6	6
16	(Switzerland) Y Allegro (Germany) M Kohlmann	6	6
Alt.	(Germany) K Braasch (Czech Republic) J Vaněk	4	0
(Chile) F González (Chile) N Massú	6	3	6
(Italy) D Bracciali (Romania) A Pavel	4	6	3
WC	(France) J Chardy (France) N Renavand	6^{5}	3
(Slovakia) K Beck (Czech Republic) J Levinský	7^{7}	6
(South Korea) Lee HT (United States) K Kim	7^{8}	4	7
4	(India) M Bhupathi (Australia) T Woodbridge	6^{6}	6	5

Second round
(Austria) J Knowle (Austria) J Melzer	w/o
(Italy) M Bertolini (Italy) F Volandri
(Argentina) L Arnold Ker (Argentina) M García	3	6	9
11	(Czech Republic) C Suk (Czech Republic) P Vízner	6	3	7
16	(Switzerland) Y Allegro (Germany) M Kohlmann	6^{4}	6	3
(Chile) F González (Chile) N Massú	7^{7}	4	6
(Slovakia) K Beck (Czech Republic) J Levinský	5	1
(South Korea) Lee HT (United States) K Kim	7	6

Third round
(Austria) J Knowle (Austria) J Melzer	6	7^{7}
(Argentina) L Arnold Ker (Argentina) M García	0	6^{0}
(Chile) F González (Chile) N Massú	6	6
(South Korea) Lee HT (United States) K Kim	2	2

Quarterfinals
(Austria) J Knowle (Austria) J Melzer	7	5	4
(Chile) F González (Chile) N Massú	5	7	6

==== Section 4 ====
First round
8	(Australia) W Arthurs (Australia) P Hanley	6	6
WC	(France) T Ascione (France) JR Lisnard	3	4
(The Bahamas) M Merklein (United States) V Spadea	6	6
(Australia) A Fisher (South Africa) C Haggard	3	4
WC	(France) É Roger-Vasselin (France) G Simon	6	6
(Czech Republic) D Škoch (United States) J Thomas	0	3
(France) JF Bachelot (France) A Clément	4	6^{5}
9	(Sweden) S Aspelin (Australia) T Perry	6	7^{7}
Alt.	(Spain) Ó Hernández (Spain) Á López Morón	6	4	0
(Czech Republic) T Berdych (Czech Republic) T Zíb	1	6	6
(Russia) N Davydenko (Russia) I Andreev	6	6^{8}	6
WC	(France) J Haehnel (France) F Serra	2	7^{10}	2
(South Africa) R Koenig (Spain) A Martín	6	7^{7}
(France) J Benneteau (France) N Mahut	4	6^{2}
(Spain) N Almagro (Argentina) J Mónaco	3	4
2	(Sweden) J Björkman (Belarus) M Mirnyi	6	6

Second round
8	(Australia) W Arthurs (Australia) P Hanley	w/o
(The Bahamas) M Merklein (United States) V Spadea
WC	(France) É Roger-Vasselin (France) G Simon	1	1
9	(Sweden) S Aspelin (Australia) T Perry	6	6
(Czech Republic) T Berdych (Czech Republic) T Zíb	2	2
(Russia) N Davydenko (Russia) I Andreev	6	6
(South Africa) R Koenig (Spain) A Martín	3	6	4
2	(Sweden) J Björkman (Belarus) M Mirnyi	6	2	6

Third round
8	(Australia) W Arthurs (Australia) P Hanley	6^{4}	6	8
9	(Sweden) S Aspelin (Australia) T Perry	7^{7}	4	6
(Russia) N Davydenko (Russia) I Andreev	6^{5}	2
2	(Sweden) J Björkman (Belarus) M Mirnyi	7^{7}	6

Quarterfinals
8	(Australia) W Arthurs (Australia) P Hanley	4	6^{5}
2	(Sweden) J Björkman (Belarus) M Mirnyi	6	7^{7}

== See also ==
- 2005 Men's Singles
- 2005 Women's Singles
- 2005 Women's Doubles
- 2005 Mixed Doubles
