= 2005 French Open – Mixed doubles =

Mixed doubles
- 2005 French Open

Final
- Champions: (Slovakia) Daniela Hantuchová (France) Fabrice Santoro
- Runners-up: (United States) Martina Navratilova (India) Leander Paes
- Score: 3–6, 6–3, 6–2

Details
- Draw: 32
- Seeds: 8

Events
Singles	men	women		boys	girls
Doubles	men	women	mixed	boys	girls
WC Singles	men	women	quad
WC Doubles	men	women	quad
Legends	−45	45+	women
- French Open

Tatiana Golovin and Richard Gasquet were the defending champions, but they chose not to participate together. The tournament was won by Daniela Hantuchová and Fabrice Santoro.

== Seeds ==
The seeded teams are listed below. Daniela Hantuchová and Fabrice Santoro are the champions; other teams show the round in which they were eliminated.

1. (Australia) Rennae Stubbs / (Canada) Daniel Nestor (second round)
2. (Japan) Ai Sugiyama / (Belarus) Max Mirnyi (first round)
3. (Zimbabwe) Cara Black / (Zimbabwe) Wayne Black (second round)
4. (Russia) Anastasia Myskina / (Sweden) Jonas Björkman (semifinals)
5. (South Africa) Liezel Huber / (Zimbabwe) Kevin Ullyett (quarterfinals)
6. (United States) Martina Navratilova / (India) Leander Paes (finals)
7. (United States) Lisa Raymond / (India) Mahesh Bhupathi (quarterfinals)
8. (Russia) Elena Likhovtseva / (Czech Republic) Leoš Friedl (first round)

== Draws ==
Key

- Q = Qualifier
- WC = Wild card
- LL = Lucky loser
- Alt = Alternate
- ITF = ITF entry
- PR = Protected ranking
- SR = Special ranking
- SE = Special exempt
- JE = Junior exempt
- JR = Junior Accelerator Programme entrant
- CO = College Accelerator Programme entrant
- NG = Next Gen Accelerator Program entrant
- w/o = Walkover
- r = Retired
- d = Defaulted

=== Finals ===
Semifinals
(Slovakia) Daniela Hantuchová (France) Fabrice Santoro	7^{7}	6
4	(Russia) Anastasia Myskina (Sweden) Jonas Björkman	6^{5}	0
(Australia) Samantha Stosur (Australia) Paul Hanley	2	3
6	(United States) Martina Navratilova (India) Leander Paes	6	6

Final
(Slovakia) Daniela Hantuchová (France) Fabrice Santoro	3	6	6
6	(United States) Martina Navratilova (India) Leander Paes	6	3	2

=== Top half ===
==== Section 1 ====
First round
1	(Australia) R Stubbs (Canada) D Nestor	7^{7}	6
WC	(France) C Pin (France) A Clément	6^{2}	3
(Australia) B Stewart (Australia) T Perry	2	4
(Slovakia) D Hantuchová (France) F Santoro	6	6
(Czech Republic) K Peschke (Czech Republic) M Damm	7	6^{5}	6
(Spain) C Martínez (Czech Republic) F Čermák	5	7^{7}	3
(Slovakia) J Husárová (Czech Republic) C Suk	6	3	6
5	(South Africa) L Huber (Zimbabwe) K Ullyett	4	6	8

Second round
1	(Australia) R Stubbs (Canada) D Nestor	7^{7}	3	3
(Slovakia) D Hantuchová (France) F Santoro	6^{4}	6	6
(Czech Republic) K Peschke (Czech Republic) M Damm	4	7^{7}	3
5	(South Africa) L Huber (Zimbabwe) K Ullyett	6	6^{1}	6

Quarterfinals
(Slovakia) D Hantuchová (France) F Santoro	6	4	6
5	(South Africa) L Huber (Zimbabwe) K Ullyett	2	6	1

==== Section 2 ====
First round
4	(Russia) A Myskina (Sweden) J Björkman	3	6	6
WC	(France) A Cornet (France) G Monfils	6	2	2
(Venezuela) M Vento-Kabchi (Argentina) M Hood	2	3
WC	(France) É Loit (France) J-F Bachelot	6	6
(Slovenia) K Srebotnik (Australia) T Woodbridge	6	3	6
(Germany) A-L Grönefeld (Austria) J Knowle	1	6	3
(Spain) V Ruano Pascual (Israel) J Erlich	3	4
7	(United States) L Raymond (India) M Bhupathi	6	6

Second round
4	(Russia) A Myskina (Sweden) J Björkman	6^{5}	7^{7}	6
WC	(France) É Loit (France) J-F Bachelot	7^{7}	6^{1}	4
(Slovenia) K Srebotnik (Australia) T Woodbridge	5	6^{4}
7	(United States) L Raymond (India) M Bhupathi	7	7^{7}

Quarterfinals
4	(Russia) A Myskina (Sweden) J Björkman	6	6
7	(United States) L Raymond (India) M Bhupathi	2	4

=== Bottom half ===
==== Section 3 ====
First round
8	(Russia) E Likhovtseva (Czech Republic) L Friedl	3	4
(Australia) S Stosur (Australia) P Hanley	6	6
(Switzerland) E Gagliardi (Argentina) M Rodríguez	3	4
(Czech Republic) N Vaidišová (The Bahamas) M Knowles	6	6
WC	(France) S Testud (France) M Gicquel	6	6
(Serbia and Montenegro) J Janković (Argentina) L Arnold Ker	3	3
WC	(France) S Brémond (France) Llodra	2	4
3	(Zimbabwe) C Black (Zimbabwe) W Black	6	6

Second round
(Australia) S Stosur (Australia) P Hanley	7^{7}	2	6
(Czech Republic) N Vaidišová (The Bahamas) M Knowles	6^{2}	6	3
WC	(France) S Testud (France) M Gicquel	6	2	6
3	(Zimbabwe) C Black (Zimbabwe) W Black	3	6	3

Quarterfinals
(Australia) S Stosur (Australia) P Hanley	6	6
WC	(France) S Testud (France) M Gicquel	4	1

==== Section 4 ====
First round
6	(United States) M Navratilova (India) L Paes	6	6
WC	(France) S Foretz (France) N Devilder	4	3
(United States) M Shaughnessy (Argentina) G Etlis	6^{7}	4
(Russia) D Safina (Sweden) S Aspelin	7^{9}	6
(United States) C Morariu (United States) J Palmer	4	6	6
(Australia) N Pratt (Czech Republic) P Vízner	6	3	4
(Serbia and Montenegro) A Ivanovic (Serbia and Montenegro) N Zimonjić	3	6	10
2	(Japan) A Sugiyama (Belarus) M Mirnyi	6	3	8

Second round
6	(United States) M Navratilova (India) L Paes	6	6
(Russia) D Safina (Sweden) S Aspelin	4	0
(United States) C Morariu (United States) J Palmer	w	/	o
(Serbia and Montenegro) A Ivanovic (Serbia and Montenegro) N Zimonjić

Quarterfinals
6	(United States) M Navratilova (India) L Paes	7^{7}	4	6
(United States) C Morariu (United States) J Palmer	6^{5}	6	3
