= Youlia Fedossova =

French tennis player

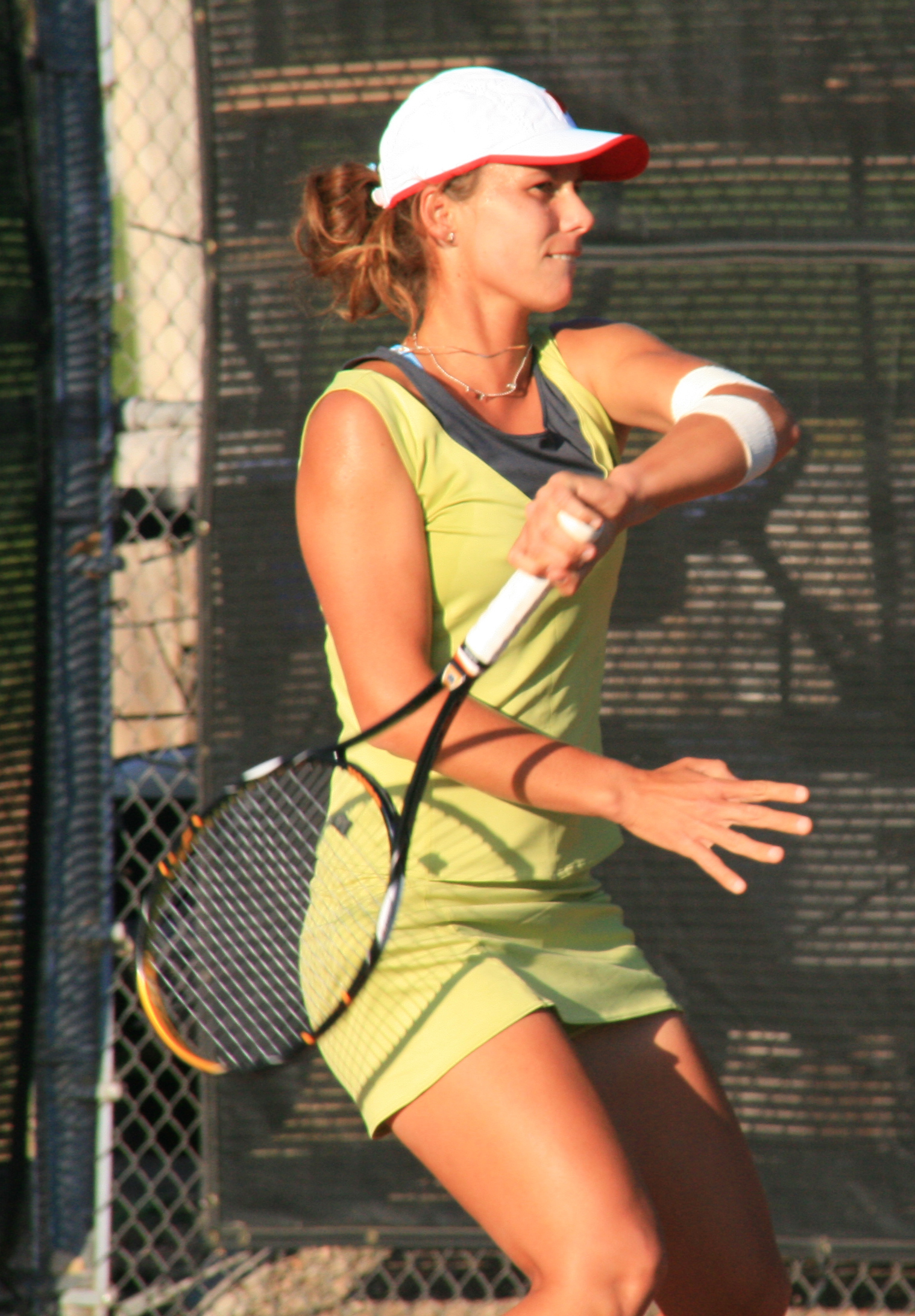
- Country (sports): France
- Residence: Paris, France
- Born: 1 July 1988 (age 37) Novosibirsk, Soviet Union
- Height: 1.81 m (5 ft 11 1/2 in)
- Turned pro: 2001
- Retired: 2011
- Plays: Right (two-handed backhand)
- Prize money: $315,681

Singles
- Career record: 169–160
- Highest ranking: No. 107 (13 August 2007)

Grand Slam singles results
- Australian Open: 2R (2007)
- French Open: 1R (2005, 2006, 2007, 2008)
- Wimbledon: Q3 (2008)
- US Open: 2R (2006)

Doubles
- Career record: 62–63
- Career titles: 4 ITF
- Highest ranking: No. 171 (26 July 2010)

Grand Slam doubles results
- French Open: 1R (2005, 2006, 2007, 2008, 2010)

Youlia Fedossova (born 1 July 1988) is a Russian-born French former professional tennis player.

In her career, Fedossova won four doubles titles on the ITF Women's Circuit. On 13 August 2007, she reached her best singles ranking of world No. 107. On 26 July 2010, she peaked at No. 171 in the WTA doubles rankings.

Fedossova moved to France when she was three years old. She competed in the main draw of the French Open in singles 2005, 2006, 2007, 2008, and in doubles 2005, 2006, 2007, 2008, 2010 but lost each time in the first round.

At the 2006 US Open, Fedossova upset 28th seed Anabel Medina Garrigues in the first round. At the 2007 Australian Open, she also reached the second round.

Fedossova retired from tennis in 2011.

== ITF finals ==
=== Singles (0–3) ===
Legend $50,000 tournaments $25,000 tournaments $10,000 tournaments	Finals by surface Hard (0–1) Clay (0–1) Carpet (0–1)

Result	No.	Date	Tournament	Surface	Opponent	Score
Loss	1.	16 October 2006	Open Saint-Raphaël, France	Carpet (i)	(France) Stéphanie Foretz	6–7, 7–6, 1–6
Loss	2.	26 January 2009	Open de l'Isère, France	Hard (i)	(United Kingdom) Naomi Broady	4–6, 2–6
Loss	3.	13 April 2009	ITF Tessenderlo, Belgium	Clay (i)	(Luxembourg) Mandy Minella	5–7, 3–6

=== Doubles (4–5) ===
Legend $50,000 tournaments $25,000 tournaments $10,000 tournaments	Finals by surface Hard (3–2) Clay (1–0) Carpet (0–3)

Outcome	No.	Date	Tournament	Surface	Partner	Opponents	Score
Runner-up	1.	16 October 2006	Saint-Raphaël, France	Carpet (i)	(France) Alizé Cornet	(Ukraine) Mariya Koryttseva (Kazakhstan) Galina Voskoboeva	2–6, 4–6
Runner-up	2.	24 March 2008	Jersey, United Kingdom	Carpet (i)	(France) Violette Huck	(United States) Courtney Nagle (United States) Robin Stephenson	3–6, 3–6
Runner-up	3.	1 July 2008	Boston, United States	Hard	(United States) Varvara Lepchenko	(Chinese Taipei) Chan Chin-wei (South Africa) Natalie Grandin	4–6, 3–6
Winner	1.	26 January 2009	Open de l'Isère, France	Hard (i)	(France) Virginie Pichet	(Russia) Maria Kondratieva (France) Sophie Lefèvre	6–3, 6–3
Runner-up	4.	2 February 2009	Belfort, France	Hard (i)	(France) Virginie Pichet	(Latvia) Irina Kuzmina (Ukraine) Oxana Lyubtsova	3–6, 6–3, [5–10]
Runner-up	5.	23 March 2009	Jersey, United Kingdom	Carpet (i)	(France) Virginie Pichet	(Italy) Maria Elena Camerin (France) Stéphanie Foretz	4–6, 2–6
Winner	2.	13 April 2009	Tessenderlo, Belgium	Clay	(France) Virginie Pichet	(Switzerland) Stefania Boffa (Croatia) Darija Jurak	7–5, 6–3
Winner	3.	12 October 2009	Open de Touraine, France	Hard (i)	(Tunisia) Selima Sfar	(France) Stéphanie Cohen-Aloro (France) Aurélie Védy	4–6, 6–0, [10–8]
Winner	4.	27 September 2010	Clermont-Ferrand, France	Hard (i)	(France) Iryna Brémond	(France) Elixane Lechemia (France) Alizé Lim	7–6^{(9–7)}, 6–3
