= Violette Huck =

French tennis player

- Country (sports): France
- Residence: Gradignan, France
- Born: 18 March 1988 (age 37) Pessac, France
- Height: 1.70 m (5 ft 7 in)
- Turned pro: 2003
- Retired: 2010
- Plays: Left (two-handed backhand)
- Prize money: $134,004

Singles
- Career record: 151–146
- Career titles: 3 ITF
- Highest ranking: No. 213 (3 December 2007)

Grand Slam singles results
- Australian Open: Q1 (2008)
- French Open: 1R (2008)
- US Open: Q1 (2007)

Doubles
- Career record: 59–77
- Career titles: 2 ITF
- Highest ranking: No. 158 (23 March 2009)

Grand Slam doubles results
- French Open: 2R (2008)

Violette Huck (born 18 March 1988) is a French former tennis player. She has a career-high singles ranking of world No. 213, achieved in December 2007. On 23 March, she peaked at No. 158 of the doubles rankings.

== Career ==
Violette has a career win–loss record of 109–105 on the ITF Women's Circuit and she there won three singles and two doubles tournaments. She missed out on qualifying for the 2008 Australian Open as she lost to the Russian player Anastasia Pavlyuchenkova, in three sets. She was awarded a wildcard for the 2008 French Open at Roland Garros as a French player.

== ITF Circuit finals ==
=== Singles (3–1) ===
$50,000 tournaments
$25,000 tournaments
$10,000 tournaments

Result	No.	Date	Tournament	Surface	Opponent	Score
Loss	1.	18 March 2007	Athens, Greece	Clay	(Brazil) Teliana Pereira	2–6, 1–6
Win	2.	7 May 2007	Warsaw, Poland	Clay	(Slovakia) Stanislava Hrozenská	3–6, 6–4, 7–5
Win	3.	15 March 2009	Dijon, France	Hard (i)	(Romania) Laura-Ioana Andrei	6–4, 7–6^{(7–2)}
Win	4.	22 March 2009	Amiens, France	Clay (i)	(France) Audrey Bergot	6–3, 6–4

=== Doubles (2–7) ===
Result	No.	Date	Tournament	Surface	Partner	Opponents	Score
Loss	1.	3 July 2005	ITF Mont de Marsan, France	Clay	(France) Émilie Bacquet	(Argentina) Natalia Gussoni (Portugal) Frederica Piedade	1–6, 6–7^{(5–7)}
Loss	2.	10 March 2007	ITF Sabadell, Spain	Clay	(Italy) Nicole Clerico	(Spain) Nuria Sánchez García (Italy) Verdiana Verardi	3–6, 6–7^{(5–7)}
Win	3.	17 March 2008	ITF Tenerife, Spain	Hard	(France) Julie Coin	(Bosnia and Herzegovina) Mervana Jugić-Salkić (Israel) Tzipora Obziler	6–4, 6–3
Loss	4.	24 March 2008	ITF Jersey, United Kingdom	Carpet	(France) Youlia Fedossova	(United States) Courtney Nagle (United States) Robin Stephenson	3–6, 3–6
Loss	5.	15 September 2008	ITF Mestre, Italy	Clay	(Georgia (country)) Margalita Chakhnashvili	(Bosnia and Herzegovina) Mervana Jugić-Salkić (France) Aurélie Védy	2–6, 3–6
Loss	6.	6 October 2008	Open de Touraine, France	Hard	(France) Julie Coin	(Bosnia and Herzegovina) Mervana Jugić-Salkić (Germany) Kristina Barrois	2–6, 6–7
Win	7.	9 February 2009	ITF Stockholm, Sweden	Hard (i)	(Finland) Emma Laine	(Austria) Melanie Klaffner (Belarus) Ksenia Milevskaya	3–6, 7–6^{(7–5)}, [10–8]
Loss	8.	15 March 2009	ITF Dijon, France	Hard (i)	(United Kingdom) Amanda Elliott	(Netherlands) Kim Kilsdonk (Netherlands) Daniëlle Harmsen	6–7^{(2–7)}, 1–6
Loss	9.	5 October 2009	Open de Limoges, France	Clay	(France) Florence Haring	(Russia) Elena Chalova (Georgia (country)) Oksana Kalashnikova	6–4, 3–6, [4–10]
