= 2009 Internationaux de Nouvelle-Calédonie – Singles =

Singles
- 2009 Internationaux de Nouvelle-Calédonie

Final
- Champion: (United States) Brendan Evans
- Runner-up: (Germany) Florian Mayer
- Score: 4–6, 6–3, 6–4

Events
Singles	Doubles
← 2008 ·	Internationaux de Nouvelle-Calédonie	· 2010 →

Flavio Cipolla was the defending champion but chose not to defend his title.
Brendan Evans won in the final 4–6, 6–3, 6–4, against Florian Mayer.

== Seeds ==
1. (Switzerland) Stéphane Bohli (first round)
2. (Romania) Victor Crivoi (first round)
3. (France) Adrian Mannarino (first round)
4. (France) Olivier Patience (first round)
5. (Germany) Daniel Brands (first round)
6. (France) Mathieu Montcourt (semifinals)
7. (France) Josselin Ouanna (first round)
8. (South Africa) Rik de Voest (first round)

== Draw ==
=== Key ===
- Q = Qualifier
- WC = Wild card
- LL = Lucky loser
- Alt = Alternate
- ITF = ITF entry
- PR = Protected ranking
- SR = Special ranking
- SE = Special exempt
- JE = Junior exempt
- JR = Junior Accelerator Programme entrant
- CO = College Accelerator Programme entrant
- NG = Next Gen Accelerator Program entrant
- w/o = Walkover
- r = Retired
- d = Defaulted

=== Final four ===
Semifinals
6	(France) Mathieu Montcourt	4	6	6^{1}
(United States) Brendan Evans	6	3	7^{7}
(United States) Ryan Sweeting	6	5	3
WC	(Germany) Florian Mayer	3	7	6

Final
(United States) Brendan Evans	4	6	6
WC	(Germany) Florian Mayer	6	3	4

=== Top half ===
First round
1	(Switzerland) Stéphane Bohli	6	3	4
(Austria) Stefan Koubek	4	6	6
(Slovenia) Grega Žemlja	6	2	5
WC	(France) Sébastien de Chaunac	3	6	7
(France) Alexandre Sidorenko	4	0
(France) Laurent Recouderc	6	6
(France) Thierry Ascione	6	6^{3}	6^{1}
6	(France) Mathieu Montcourt	3	7^{7}	7^{7}
4	(France) Olivier Patience	3	6	2
WC	(France) Benoît Paire	6	1	6
(United States) Brendan Evans	2	6	6
(Czech Republic) Pavel Šnobel	6	1	4
Q	(Italy) Riccardo Ghedin	3	6	6^{6}
(Italy) Paolo Lorenzi	6	4	7^{8}
Q	(France) Jean-Christophe Faurel	3	6	6
5	(Germany) Daniel Brands	6	3	4

Second round
(Austria) Stefan Koubek	6	6
WC	(France) Sébastien de Chaunac	2	1
(France) Laurent Recouderc	1	6^{1}
6	(France) Mathieu Montcourt	6	7^{7}
WC	(France) Benoît Paire	6^{1}	2
(United States) Brendan Evans	7^{7}	6
(Italy) Paolo Lorenzi	4	0
Q	(France) Jean-Christophe Faurel	6	6

Quarterfinals
(Austria) Stefan Koubek	5	6^{6}
6	(France) Mathieu Montcourt	7	7^{8}
(United States) Brendan Evans	3	7^{7}	6
(France) Jean-Christophe Faurel	6	6^{3}	3

Semifinals
6	(France) Mathieu Montcourt	4	6	6^{1}
(United States) Brendan Evans	6	3	7^{7}

=== Bottom half ===
First round
7	(France) Josselin Ouanna	6	2	6^{7}
(France) Édouard Roger-Vasselin	4	6	7^{9}
(France) David Guez	0	1
(United States) Ryan Sweeting	6	6
(United Kingdom) Joshua Goodall	5	7^{7}	1
Q	(Germany) Dieter Kindlmann	7	6^{3}	6
(Monaco) Jean-René Lisnard	6	6
3	(France) Adrian Mannarino	2	3
8	(South Africa) Rik de Voest	6	5	3
(United Kingdom) Alex Bogdanovic	4	7	6
(United States) Scoville Jenkins	7	2	4
Q	(United Kingdom) Alexander Slabinsky	5	6	6
(France) Éric Prodon	6^{2}	7	2
WC	(France) Jonathan Dasnières de Veigy	7^{7}	5	6
WC	(Germany) Florian Mayer	7^{7}	6
2	(Romania) Victor Crivoi	6^{3}	0

Second round
(France) Édouard Roger-Vasselin	3	4
(United States) Ryan Sweeting	6	6
Q	(Germany) Dieter Kindlmann	2	3
(Monaco) Jean-René Lisnard	6	6
(United Kingdom) Alex Bogdanovic	6	7
Q	(United Kingdom) Alexander Slabinsky	3	5
WC	(France) Jonathan Dasnières de Veigy	6^{2}	5
WC	(Germany) Florian Mayer	7^{7}	7

Quarterfinals
(United States) Ryan Sweeting	6	6
(Monaco) Jean-René Lisnard	2	4
(United Kingdom) Alex Bogdanovic	6^{3}	7	1
WC	(Germany) Florian Mayer	7^{7}	5	6

Semifinals
(United States) Ryan Sweeting	6	5	3
WC	(Germany) Florian Mayer	3	7	6
