= 2008 Internationaux de Nouvelle-Calédonie – Doubles =

Doubles
- 2008 Internationaux de Nouvelle-Calédonie

Final
- Champions: (Italy) Flavio Cipolla (Italy) Simone Vagnozzi
- Runners-up: (Czech Republic) Jan Mertl (Austria) Martin Slanar
- Score: 6–4, 6–4

Events
Singles	Doubles
← 2007 ·	Internationaux de Nouvelle-Calédonie	· 2009 →

Alex Kuznetsov and Phillip Simmonds were the defending champions but chose not to defend their title.

Flavio Cipolla and Simone Vagnozzi won the title after defeating Jan Mertl and Martin Slanar 6–4, 6–4 in the final.

== Seeds ==
1. (Italy) Flavio Cipolla / (Italy) Simone Vagnozzi (champions)
2. (Monaco) Jean-René Lisnard / (France) Thomas Oger (quarterfinals)
3. (Czech Republic) Jan Mertl / (Austria) Martin Slanar (final)
4. (Switzerland) Stéphane Bohli / (France) Jérémy Chardy (quarterfinals)

== Draw ==
=== Key ===
- Q = Qualifier
- WC = Wild card
- LL = Lucky loser
- Alt = Alternate
- SE = Special exempt
- PR = Protected ranking
- ITF = ITF entry
- JE = Junior exempt
- w/o = Walkover
- r = Retired
- d = Defaulted
- SR = Special ranking

First round
1	(Italy) F Cipolla (Italy) S Vagnozzi	6	6
(France) Aurélien David (France) Yvonick Rivat	1	1
(Czech Republic) T Cakl (Italy) P Lorenzi	3	3
(United States) S Jenkins (United States) R Sweeting	6	6
4	(Switzerland) S Bohli (France) J Chardy	6	6
(France) Christophe Godot (France) N N'Godrela	3	3
(France) A Gensse (Japan) Norikazu Sugiyama	7	5	[10]
(France) N Devilder (France) D Guez	5	7	[4]
(France) J Ouanna (France) L Recouderc	6	7
(United Kingdom) A Bogdanovic (New Zealand) D King-Turner	4	5
(France) F Fontang (France) Laurent Raymond	3	2
3	(Czech Republic) J Mertl (Austria) M Slanar	6	6
(United States) K Kim (Israel) N Okun	7^{7}	6
(South Africa) K Anderson (United States) K. J. Hippensteel	6^{4}	1
(Uzbekistan) D Istomin (Spain) A Menéndez
2	(Monaco) J-R Lisnard (France) T Oger	w/o

Quarterfinals
1	(Italy) F Cipolla (Italy) S Vagnozzi	6	6^{4}	[12]
(United States) S Jenkins (United States) R Sweeting	2	7^{7}	[10]
4	(Switzerland) S Bohli (France) J Chardy	6^{4}	7^{8}	[7]
(France) A Gensse (Japan) N Sugiyama	7^{7}	6^{6}	[10]
(France) J Ouanna (France) L Recouderc	2	6^{3}
3	(Czech Republic) J Mertl (Austria) M Slanar	6	7^{7}
(United States) K Kim (Israel) N Okun	7^{9}	6
2	(Monaco) J-R Lisnard (France) T Oger	6^{7}	2

Semifinals
1	(Italy) F Cipolla (Italy) S Vagnozzi	7	6
(France) A Gensse (Japan) N Sugiyama	5	2
3	(Czech Republic) J Mertl (Austria) M Slanar	6	3	[10]
(United States) K Kim (Israel) N Okun	3	6	[3]

Final
1	(Italy) F Cipolla (Italy) S Vagnozzi	6	6
3	(Czech Republic) J Mertl (Austria) M Slanar	4	4
