= 2007 Internationaux de Nouvelle-Calédonie – Singles =

Singles
- 2007 Internationaux de Nouvelle-Calédonie

Final
- Champion: (United States) Michael Russell
- Runner-up: (France) David Guez
- Score: 6–0, 6–1

Events
Singles	Doubles
← 2006 ·	Internationaux de Nouvelle-Calédonie	· 2008 →

Gilles Simon was the defending champion but chose not to defend his title.

Michael Russell won the title after defeating David Guez 6–0, 6–1 in the final.

== Seeds ==
1. (France) Nicolas Devilder (first round)
2. (France) Michaël Llodra (quarterfinals)
3. (Spain) Gorka Fraile (first round)
4. (United States) Michael Russell (champion)
5. (France) Jean-Christophe Faurel (first round)
6. (Netherlands) Robin Haase (first round)
7. (Israel) Noam Okun (semifinals)
8. (France) Mathieu Montcourt (first round)

== Draw ==
=== Key ===
- Q = Qualifier
- WC = Wild card
- LL = Lucky loser
- Alt = Alternate
- SE = Special exempt
- PR = Protected ranking
- ITF = ITF entry
- JE = Junior exempt
- w/o = Walkover
- r = Retired
- d = Defaulted
- SR = Special ranking

=== Finals ===
Semifinals
7	(Israel) Noam Okun	1	1^{r}
4	(United States) Michael Russell	6	1
(France) David Guez	7	6
(Slovakia) Lukáš Lacko	5	2

Final
4	(United States) Michael Russell	6	6
(France) David Guez	0	1

=== Top half ===
First round
1	(France) N Devilder	6	3	2
Q	(United States) S Oudsema	4	6	6
(United States) A Kuznetsov	6^{4}	6	7^{7}
(United States) W Odesnik	7^{7}	1	6^{0}
(France) J-W Tsonga	2	6	5
(Switzerland) S Bohli	6	0	7
WC	(France) J Chardy	6^{3}	6	2
7	(Israel) N Okun	7^{7}	2	6
4	(United States) M Russell	6	6
Q	(France) L Recouderc	0	1
(France) N Tourte	2	3
WC	(France) A Sidorenko	6	6
(Spain) M López	6	2	4
(France) T Ascione	3	6	6
(Slovakia) I Klec	1	6	6
5	(France) J-C Faurel	6	3	4

Second round
Q	(United States) S Oudsema	6	7^{13}
(United States) A Kuznetsov	4	6^{11}
(Switzerland) S Bohli	1	1
7	(Israel) N Okun	6	6
4	(United States) M Russell	6	6
WC	(France) A Sidorenko	2	1
(France) T Ascione	6	1	6
(Slovakia) I Klec	3	6	4

Quarterfinals
Q	(United States) S Oudsema	3	4
7	(Israel) N Okun	6	6
4	(United States) M Russell	6	6
(France) T Ascione	1	2

Semifinals
7	(Israel) N Okun	1	1^{r}
4	(United States) M Russell	6	1

=== Bottom half ===
First round
8	(France) M Montcourt	6^{7}	6	6^{2}
(Poland) M Przysiężny	7^{9}	3	7^{7}
(France) D Guez	6	6
(Czech Republic) P Šnobel	3	1
Q	(United States) N Monroe	3	6^{4}
(Czech Republic) J Mertl	6	7^{7}
(Italy) F Cipolla	6	7^{7}
3	(Spain) G Fraile	2	6^{4}
6	(Netherlands) R Haase	6^{2}	4
(Slovakia) L Lacko	7^{7}	6
(Germany) S Stadler	7	6
WC	(France) S de Chaunac	5	3
WC	(France) E Roger-Vasselin	7^{7}	6^{4}	1
LL	(Monaco) B Balleret	6^{5}	7^{7}	6
(United States) A Bogomolov Jr.	0^{r}
2	(France) M Llodra	3

Second round
(Poland) M Przysiężny	6^{7}	4
(France) D Guez	7^{9}	6
(Czech Republic) J Mertl	6	6
(Italy) F Cipolla	4	4
(Slovakia) L Lacko	6	6
(Germany) S Stadler	1	2
LL	(Monaco) B Balleret	2	3
2	(France) M Llodra	6	6

Quarterfinals
(France) D Guez	6	4	6
(Czech Republic) J Mertl	2	6	1
(Slovakia) L Lacko	6	3	6
2	(France) M Llodra	4	6	4

Semifinals
(France) D Guez	7	6
(Slovakia) L Lacko	5	2
