= 2007 Internationaux de Nouvelle-Calédonie – Doubles =

Doubles
- 2007 Internationaux de Nouvelle-Calédonie

Final
- Champions: (United States) Alex Kuznetsov (United States) Phillip Simmonds
- Runners-up: (France) Thierry Ascione (France) Édouard Roger-Vasselin
- Score: 7–6^{(7–5)}, 6–3

Events
| Singles | Doubles |
| ← 2006 · | Internationaux de Nouvelle-Calédonie | · 2008 → |

Alex Bogomolov Jr. and Todd Widom were the defending champions but chose not to defend their title.

Alex Kuznetsov and Phillip Simmonds won the title after defeating Thierry Ascione and Édouard Roger-Vasselin 7–6^{(7–5)}, 6–3 in the final.

== Seeds ==
1. (Italy) Leonardo Azzaro / (Italy) Flavio Cipolla (first round)
2. (Czech Republic) Jan Mertl / (Czech Republic) Pavel Šnobel (first round)
3. (Netherlands) Robin Haase / (Poland) Michał Przysiężny (first round)
4. (France) David Guez / (France) Alexandre Sidorenko (quarterfinals)

== Draw ==
=== Key ===
- Q = Qualifier
- WC = Wild card
- LL = Lucky loser
- Alt = Alternate
- SE = Special exempt
- PR = Protected ranking
- ITF = ITF entry
- JE = Junior exempt
- w/o = Walkover
- r = Retired
- d = Defaulted
- SR = Special ranking

First round
1 | (Italy) L Azzaro (Italy) F Cipolla | 6^{8} | 5
(Israel) N Okun (United States) M Russell | 7^{10} | 7
(France) N Devilder (France) L Recouderc | 4 | 3
(United States) A Kuznetsov (United States) P Simmonds | 6 | 6
3 | (Netherlands) R Haase (Poland) M Przysiężny | 6 | 3 | [7]
PR | (France) S de Chaunac (France) J-C Faurel | 4 | 6 | [10]
WC | (France) Nicolas Frayssinoux (France) Philippe Frayssinoux | 1 | 3
(Switzerland) S Bohli (Slovakia) I Klec | 6 | 6
(France) T Ascione (France) É Roger-Vasselin | 6 | 6
(Sweden) J Adaktusson (United States) W Odesnik | 2 | 2
(Spain) G Fraile (Spain) M López | 0 | 6 | [5]
4 | (France) D Guez (France) A Sidorenko | 6 | 4 | [10]
WC | (Monaco) B Balleret (France) J Chardy | 2 | 2
(France) M Montcourt (France) N Tourte | 6 | 6
WC | (United States) N Monroe (United States) S Oudsema | 7^{7} | 6^{4} | [10]
2 | (Czech Republic) J Mertl (Czech Republic) P Šnobel | 6^{3} | 7^{7} | [7]

Quarterfinals
(Israel) N Okun (United States) M Russell | 6 | 3 | [3]
(United States) A Kuznetsov (United States) P Simmonds | 4 | 6 | [10]
PR | (France) S de Chaunac (France) J-C Faurel | 2 | 3
(Switzerland) S Bohli (Slovakia) I Klec | 6 | 6
(France) T Ascione (France) É Roger-Vasselin | 2 | 6 | [10]
4 | (France) D Guez (France) A Sidorenko | 6 | 2 | [8]
(France) M Montcourt (France) N Tourte | 7 | 1 | [4]
WC | (United States) N Monroe (United States) S Oudsema | 5 | 6 | [10]

Semifinals
(United States) A Kuznetsov (United States) P Simmonds | 6 | 6
(Switzerland) S Bohli (Slovakia) I Klec | 0 | 2
(France) T Ascione (France) É Roger-Vasselin | 6 | 6
WC | (United States) N Monroe (United States) S Oudsema | 1 | 0

Final
(United States) A Kuznetsov (United States) P Simmonds | 7^{7} | 6
(France) T Ascione (France) É Roger-Vasselin | 6^{5} | 3
