= 2009 French Open – Men's singles qualifying =

Men's singles qualifying
- 2009 French Open

Events
Singles	men	women		boys	girls
Doubles	men	women	mixed	boys	girls
WC Singles	men	women	quad
WC Doubles	men	women	quad
Legends	−45	45+	women

Qualification
Singles	men	women
- French Open

This article displays the qualifying draw for men's singles at the 2009 French Open.

== Seeds ==
1. (Italy) Fabio Fognini (qualified)
2. (Argentina) Leonardo Mayer (qualified)
3. (Brazil) Marcos Daniel (qualified)
4. (Romania) Victor Crivoi (qualified)
5. (Argentina) Guillermo Cañas (first round)
6. (Argentina) Brian Dabul (moved to main draw)
7. (Canada) Frank Dancevic (first round)
8. (Italy) Flavio Cipolla (qualifying competition)
9. (Ukraine) Sergiy Stakhovsky (qualified)
10. (Germany) Simon Greul (qualified)
11. (Croatia) Roko Karanušić (second round)
12. (Germany) Michael Berrer (first round)
13. (Brazil) Thiago Alves (qualifying competition, lucky loser)
14. (Spain) Santiago Ventura (qualified)
15. (Argentina) Horacio Zeballos (second round)
16. (Portugal) Rui Machado (qualified)
17. (France) Mathieu Montcourt (qualifying competition, lucky loser)
18. (Uruguay) Pablo Cuevas (qualifying competition)
19. (Colombia) Santiago Giraldo (qualified)
20. (Germany) Daniel Brands (qualified)
21. (Serbia) Ilija Bozoljac (qualified)
22. (Belgium) Olivier Rochus (qualifying competition)
23. (Russia) Michail Elgin (second round)
24. (Algeria) Lamine Ouahab (qualifying competition)
25. (Poland) Łukasz Kubot (qualified)
26. (India) Somdev Devvarman (qualifying competition)
27. (Australia) Chris Guccione (first round)
28. (United States) Jesse Levine (first round)
29. (Netherlands) Jesse Huta Galung (second round)
30. (Czech Republic) Lukáš Rosol (qualifying competition)
31. (South Africa) Kevin Anderson (qualifying competition)
32. (France) Olivier Patience (first round)
33. (Slovakia) Karol Beck (first round)

== Qualifiers ==
1. (Italy) Fabio Fognini
2. (Argentina) Leonardo Mayer
3. (Brazil) Marcos Daniel
4. (Romania) Victor Crivoi
5. (Serbia) Ilija Bozoljac
6. (Germany) Daniel Brands
7. (Monaco) Jean-René Lisnard
8. (Colombia) Santiago Giraldo
9. (Ukraine) Sergiy Stakhovsky
10. (Germany) Simon Greul
11. (Canada) Peter Polansky
12. (Brazil) Franco Ferreiro
13. (Poland) Łukasz Kubot
14. (Spain) Santiago Ventura
15. (Czech Republic) Jiří Vaněk
16. (Portugal) Rui Machado

=== Lucky losers ===
1. (Brazil) Thiago Alves
2. (France) Mathieu Montcourt

== Qualifying draw ==
Key

- Q = Qualifier
- WC = Wild card
- LL = Lucky loser
- Alt = Alternate
- ITF = ITF entry
- PR = Protected ranking
- SR = Special ranking
- SE = Special exempt
- JE = Junior exempt
- JR = Junior Accelerator Programme entrant
- CO = College Accelerator Programme entrant
- NG = Next Gen Accelerator Program entrant
- w/o = Walkover
- r = Retired
- d = Defaulted

=== First qualifier ===
First round
1	(Italy) Fabio Fognini	6	6
(South Korea) Im Kyu-tae	4	1
(Dominican Republic) Víctor Estrella	5	4
(Kazakhstan) Mikhail Kukushkin	7	6
(Ecuador) Giovanni Lapentti	3	4
WC	(France) Benoît Paire	6	6
(Australia) Robert Smeets	7^{7}	3	5
23	(Russia) Michail Elgin	6^{5}	6	7

Second round
1	(Italy) Fabio Fognini	6	7^{7}
(Kazakhstan) Mikhail Kukushkin	3	6^{4}
WC	(France) Benoît Paire	6	6^{4}	7
23	(Russia) Michail Elgin	4	7^{7}	5

Qualifying competition
1	(Italy) Fabio Fognini	6	6
WC	(France) Benoît Paire	2	3

=== Second qualifier ===
First round
2	(Argentina) Leonardo Mayer	6	6
(Switzerland) George Bastl	4	4
(Netherlands) Thiemo de Bakker	6	6
(Turkey) Marsel İlhan	4	2
(Mexico) Santiago González	3	0
(France) Stéphane Robert	6	6
(Australia) Brydan Klein	6^{7}	0
31	(South Africa) Kevin Anderson	7^{9}	6

Second round
2	(Argentina) Leonardo Mayer	6	1	8
(Netherlands) Thiemo de Bakker	4	6	6
(France) Stéphane Robert	6	6^{9}	7
31	(South Africa) Kevin Anderson	3	7^{11}	9

Qualifying competition
2	(Argentina) Leonardo Mayer	6	6
31	(South Africa) Kevin Anderson	2	4

=== Third qualifier ===
First round
3	(Brazil) Marcos Daniel	6	6
(India) Prakash Amritraj	4	4
(Croatia) Ivan Dodig	6	6
(Brazil) Caio Zampieri	3	2
PR	(United States) Ryler DeHeart	6	5	3
(United Kingdom) Alex Bogdanovic	4	7	6
(Brazil) João Souza	2	6	5
26	(India) Somdev Devvarman	6	2	7

Second round
3	(Brazil) Marcos Daniel	7	6
(Croatia) Ivan Dodig	5	4
(United Kingdom) Alex Bogdanovic	2	7^{7}	4
26	(India) Somdev Devvarman	6	6^{3}	6

Qualifying competition
3	(Brazil) Marcos Daniel	6	6
26	(India) Somdev Devvarman	0	1

=== Fourth qualifier ===
First round
4	(Romania) Victor Crivoi	4	7	6
(Spain) David Marrero	6	5	3
(United States) Rajeev Ram	6	6
WC	(France) Julien Obry	4	2
(Brazil) Ricardo Hocevar	5	7^{9}	6
(Germany) Tobias Kamke	7	6^{7}	3
(Brazil) André Miele	6	3	3
30	(Czech Republic) Lukáš Rosol	3	6	6

Second round
4	(Romania) Victor Crivoi	6	6
(United States) Rajeev Ram	4	4
(Brazil) Ricardo Hocevar	7^{8}	2	1
30	(Czech Republic) Lukáš Rosol	6^{6}	6	6

Qualifying competition
4	(Romania) Victor Crivoi	7	6
30	(Czech Republic) Lukáš Rosol	5	1

=== Fifth qualifier ===
First round
5	(Argentina) Guillermo Cañas	4	6^{7}
(Italy) Paolo Lorenzi	6	7^{9}
(Spain) Daniel Muñoz-de la Nava	7^{8}	7
(Argentina) Martín Alund	6^{6}	5
(Australia) Joseph Sirianni	7^{7}	6
(Austria) Martin Fischer	6^{1}	4
WC	(France) Jonathan Dasnières de Veigy	4	2
21	(Serbia) Ilija Bozoljac	6	6

Second round
(Italy) Paolo Lorenzi	1	6	6
(Spain) Daniel Muñoz-de la Nava	6	3	3
(Australia) Joseph Sirianni	7^{7}	3	4
21	(Serbia) Ilija Bozoljac	6^{5}	6	6

Qualifying competition
4	(Italy) Paolo Lorenzi	6	5	3
21	(Serbia) Ilija Bozoljac	4	7	6

=== Sixth qualifier ===
First round
33	(Slovakia) Karol Beck	1	3
(Spain) Pablo Santos González	6	6
(Slovenia) Grega Žemlja	6	5	5
(France) Sébastien de Chaunac	3	7	7
(Ukraine) Sergei Bubka	6^{5}	6	4
(United States) Scoville Jenkins	7^{7}	4	6
(Colombia) Alejandro Falla	6	5	1
20	(Germany) Daniel Brands	4	7	6

Second round
(Spain) Pablo Santos González	7^{7}	2	2
(France) Sébastien de Chaunac	6^{1}	6	6
(United States) Scoville Jenkins	5	6	3
20	(Germany) Daniel Brands	7	1	6

Qualifying competition
(France) Sébastien de Chaunac	6^{5}	7^{7}	8
20	(Germany) Daniel Brands	7^{7}	6^{3}	10

=== Seventh qualifier ===
First round
7	(Canada) Frank Dancevic	6^{2}	4
(Monaco) Jean-René Lisnard	7^{7}	6
(Slovenia) Luka Gregorc	7^{7}	6
(Belgium) Dick Norman	6^{5}	4
(Serbia) Boris Pašanski	1	5
(France) Nicolas Mahut	6	7
(Belgium) Niels Desein	6^{7}	5
24	(Algeria) Lamine Ouahab	7^{9}	7

Second round
(Monaco) Jean-René Lisnard	6	4	9
(Slovenia) Luka Gregorc	2	6	7
(France) Nicolas Mahut	4	6^{3}
24	(Algeria) Lamine Ouahab	6	7^{7}

Qualifying competition
(Monaco) Jean-René Lisnard	6	6
24	(Algeria) Lamine Ouahab	4	3

=== Eighth qualifier ===
First round
8	(Italy) Flavio Cipolla	6^{4}	6	8
(Germany) Dominik Meffert	7^{7}	2	6
(Peru) Luis Horna	7^{8}	2	10
(Spain) Pere Riba	6^{6}	6	8
(Germany) Julian Reister	6	6
(United States) Todd Widom	4	1
WC	(France) David Guez	4	1
19	(Colombia) Santiago Giraldo	6	6

Second round
8	(Italy) Flavio Cipolla	6	6
(Peru) Luis Horna	4	4
(Germany) Julian Reister	6^{4}	7^{7}	2
19	(Colombia) Santiago Giraldo	7^{7}	6^{5}	6

Qualifying competition
8	(Italy) Flavio Cipolla	2	6	1
19	(Colombia) Santiago Giraldo	6	3	6

=== Ninth qualifier ===
First round
9	(Ukraine) Sergiy Stakhovsky	4	6	8
(South Africa) Rik de Voest	6	3	6
(Switzerland) Stéphane Bohli	4	6	5
(United States) Ryan Sweeting	6	1	7
(Germany) Alexander Flock	6	5	9
(Romania) Adrian Ungur	4	7	7
(Australia) Peter Luczak	7^{8}	6^{6}	6
27	(Australia) Chris Guccione	6^{6}	7^{8}	4

Second round
9	(Ukraine) Sergiy Stakhovsky	7^{7}	7
(United States) Ryan Sweeting	6^{1}	5
(Germany) Alexander Flock	5	6	10
(Australia) Peter Luczak	7	4	8

Qualifying competition
9	(Ukraine) Sergiy Stakhovsky	6	6
(Germany) Alexander Flock	4	2

=== Tenth qualifier ===
First round
10	(Germany) Simon Greul	6	6
WC	(France) Mathieu Rodrigues	3	4
(Germany) Dieter Kindlmann	7	2	6
(Switzerland) Michael Lammer	5	6	3
Alt	(Argentina) Diego Alvarez	4	3
(Netherlands) Michel Koning	6	6
(Italy) Tomas Tenconi	6^{3}	0
18	(Uruguay) Pablo Cuevas	7^{7}	6

Second round
10	(Germany) Simon Greul	6	7
(Germany) Dieter Kindlmann	2	5
(Netherlands) Michel Koning	4	4
18	(Uruguay) Pablo Cuevas	6	6

Qualifying competition
10	(Germany) Simon Greul	6	7^{7}
18	(Uruguay) Pablo Cuevas	3	6^{4}

=== Eleventh qualifier ===
First round
11	(Croatia) Roko Karanušić	4	6	12
(Brazil) Ricardo Mello	6	2	10
(Canada) Peter Polansky	6	6
(Spain) Fernando Vicente	3	2
(Croatia) Antonio Veić	5	0^{r}
(Australia) Marinko Matosevic	7	2
PR	(Argentina) Mariano Zabaleta	7^{7}	4	4
22	(Belgium) Olivier Rochus	6^{3}	6	6

Second round
11	(Croatia) Roko Karanušić	2	4
(Canada) Peter Polansky	6	6
(Australia) Marinko Matosevic	6^{3}	4
22	(Belgium) Olivier Rochus	7^{7}	6

Qualifying competition
(Canada) Peter Polansky	6	6
22	(Belgium) Olivier Rochus	4	3

=== Twelfth qualifier ===
First round
12	(Germany) Michael Berrer	6^{5}	0
(Italy) Filippo Volandri	7^{7}	6
(United Kingdom) Joshua Goodall	4	4
(United States) Amer Delić	6	6
(Germany) Simon Stadler	4	3
(Brazil) Franco Ferreiro	6	6
(Kazakhstan) Yuri Schukin	4	4
29	(Netherlands) Jesse Huta Galung	6	6

Second round
(Italy) Filippo Volandri	5	6^{4}
(United States) Amer Delić	7	7^{7}
(Brazil) Franco Ferreiro	6^{5}	7^{7}	6
29	(Netherlands) Jesse Huta Galung	7^{7}	6^{3}	2

Qualifying competition
(United States) Amer Delić	4	5
(Brazil) Franco Ferreiro	6	7

=== Thirteenth qualifier ===
First round
13	(Brazil) Thiago Alves	6^{2}	6	6
(Czech Republic) Jaroslav Pospíšil	7^{7}	1	4
(France) Édouard Roger-Vasselin	6	6
(Romania) Adrian Cruciat	3	2
PR	(Mexico) Bruno Echagaray	2	5
(Sweden) Björn Rehnquist	6	7
WC	(France) Axel Michon	4	4
25	(Poland) Łukasz Kubot	6	6

Second round
13	(Brazil) Thiago Alves	7	3	6
(France) Édouard Roger-Vasselin	5	6	3
(Sweden) Björn Rehnquist	7	3	2
25	(Poland) Łukasz Kubot	5	6	6

Qualifying competition
13	(Brazil) Thiago Alves	6	3	8
25	(Poland) Łukasz Kubot	4	6	10

=== Fourteenth qualifier ===
First round
14	(Spain) Santiago Ventura	6^{2}	6	6
(United States) Michael Russell	7^{7}	1	4
(Spain) Marc López	3	6	4
WC	(Chinese Taipei) Yang Tsung-hua	6	4	6
(Germany) Matthias Bachinger	4	0
(France) Éric Prodon	6	6
(United States) Brendan Evans	7^{8}	2	2
17	(France) Mathieu Montcourt	6^{6}	6	6

Second round
14	(Spain) Santiago Ventura	6	6
WC	(Chinese Taipei) Yang Tsung-hua	3	3
(France) Éric Prodon	6	3	3
17	(France) Mathieu Montcourt	4	6	6

Qualifying competition
14	(Spain) Santiago Ventura	7^{7}	6
17	(France) Mathieu Montcourt	6^{0}	1

=== Fifteenth qualifier ===
First round
15	(Argentina) Horacio Zeballos	7^{7}	6
(Belgium) Ruben Bemelmans	6^{2}	4
(Czech Republic) Jiří Vaněk	6	6
WC	(France) Jonathan Eysseric	2	1
(Slovakia) Dominik Hrbatý	6	2	6
(Italy) Alessio di Mauro	4	6	2
(Italy) Riccardo Ghedin	7^{8}	6
32	(France) Olivier Patience	6^{6}	4

Second round
15	(Argentina) Horacio Zeballos	1	6^{4}
(Czech Republic) Jiří Vaněk	6	7^{7}
(Slovakia) Dominik Hrbatý	6	6
(Italy) Riccardo Ghedin	4	2

Qualifying competition
(Czech Republic) Jiří Vaněk	7^{7}	6
(Slovakia) Dominik Hrbatý	6^{1}	2

=== Sixteenth qualifier ===
First round
16	(Portugal) Rui Machado	2	7	7
(Italy) Marco Crugnola	6	5	5
(Spain) Miguel Ángel López Jaén	4	6	4
(Italy) Giancarlo Petrazzuolo	6	4	6
WC	(France) Thierry Ascione	6	6
(Argentina) Juan-Pablo Brzezicki	1	2
(Argentina) Sebastián Decoud	1	6	10
28	(United States) Jesse Levine	6	3	8

Second round
16	(Portugal) Rui Machado	6	6
(Italy) Giancarlo Petrazzuolo	2	0
WC	(France) Thierry Ascione	3	7	6
(Argentina) Sebastián Decoud	6	5	3

Qualifying competition
16	(Portugal) Rui Machado	6	6
(France) Thierry Ascione	4	1
