= 2009 Internationaux de Nouvelle-Calédonie =

- Date: January 5 – January 11
- Edition: 6th

Champions

Singles
- (United States) Brendan Evans
← 2008 ·	Internationaux de Nouvelle-Calédonie	· 2010 →

The 2009 Internationaux de Nouvelle-Calédonie was a professional tennis tournament played on outdoor hard courts. It was part of the 2009 ATP Challenger Tour. It took place in Nouméa, New Caledonia between 5 and 11 January 2009.

== Singles main-draw entrants ==
=== Seeds ===
Country	Player	Rank^{1}	Seed
SUI	Stéphane Bohli	128	1
ROM	Victor Crivoi	133	2
FRA	Adrian Mannarino	134	3
FRA	Olivier Patience	141	4
GER	Daniel Brands	150	5
FRA	Mathieu Montcourt	151	6
FRA	Josselin Ouanna	154	7
RSA	Rik de Voest	159	8

- Rankings are as of 29 December 2008.

=== Other entrants ===
The following players received wildcards into the singles main draw:

- (France) Jonathan Dasnières de Veigy
- (France) Sébastien de Chaunac
- (Germany) Florian Mayer
- (France) Benoît Paire

The following players received entry from the qualifying draw:

- (France) Jean-Christophe Faurel
- (Italy) Riccardo Ghedin
- (Germany) Dieter Kindlmann
- (United Kingdom) Alexander Slabinsky

== Champions ==
=== Singles ===
- (United States) Brendan Evans def. (Germany) Florian Mayer, 4–6, 6–3, 6–4.

=== Doubles ===
Play cancelled due to rain.
