= 2007 Internationaux de Nouvelle-Calédonie =

- Date: 2–7 January
- Edition: 4th
- Draw: 32S / 16D
- Surface: Hard
- Location: Nouméa, New Caledonia

Champions

Singles
- (United States) Michael Russell

Doubles
- (United States) Alex Kuznetsov / (United States) Phillip Simmonds
← 2006 ·	Internationaux de Nouvelle-Calédonie	· 2008 →

The 2007 Internationaux de Nouvelle-Calédonie was a professional tennis tournament played on hard courts. It was the fourth edition of the tournament which was part of the 2007 ATP Challenger Series. It took place in Nouméa, New Caledonia between 2–7 January 2007.

== Singles main-draw entrants ==
=== Seeds ===
Country	Player	Rank^{1}	Seed
FRA	Nicolas Devilder	95	1
FRA	Michaël Llodra	96	2
ESP	Gorka Fraile	136	3
USA	Michael Russell	144	4
FRA	Jean-Christophe Faurel	157	5
NED	Robin Haase	167	6
ISR	Noam Okun	178	7
FRA	Mathieu Montcourt	186	8

- ^{1} Rankings are as of 25 December 2006.

=== Other entrants ===
The following players received wildcards into the singles main draw:

- (France) Jérémy Chardy
- (France) Sébastien de Chaunac
- (France) Édouard Roger-Vasselin
- (France) Alexandre Sidorenko

The following players received entry from the qualifying draw:

- (United States) Nicholas Monroe
- (United States) Scott Oudsema
- (France) Laurent Recouderc
- (Czech Republic) Pavel Šnobel

The following player received entry as a lucky loser:

- (Monaco) Benjamin Balleret

== Champions ==
=== Singles ===
- (United States) Michael Russell def. (France) David Guez 6–0, 6–1.

=== Doubles ===
- (United States) Alex Kuznetsov / (United States) Phillip Simmonds def. (France) Thierry Ascione / (France) Édouard Roger-Vasselin 7–6^{(7–5)}, 6–3.
