= 2008 French Open – Men's singles qualifying =

Men's singles qualifying
- 2008 French Open

Events
Singles	men	women		boys	girls
Doubles	men	women	mixed	boys	girls
WC Singles	men	women	quad
WC Doubles	men	women	quad
Legends	−45	45+	women

Qualification
Singles	men	women
- French Open

This article displays the qualifying draw for men's singles at the 2008 French Open.

== Seeds ==
1. (Argentina) Eduardo Schwank (qualified)
2. (Brazil) Thomaz Bellucci (qualified)
3. (Peru) Luis Horna (qualifying competition, lucky loser)
4. (Russia) Evgeny Korolev (qualifying competition, lucky loser)
5. (Japan) Kei Nishikori (second round)
6. (South Africa) Kevin Anderson (second round)
7. (Croatia) Roko Karanušić (qualified)
8. (Argentina) Brian Dabul (first round)
9. (Italy) Flavio Cipolla (first round)
10. (Chile) Nicolás Massú (second round)
11. (Belgium) Christophe Rochus (first round)
12. (South Africa) Rik de Voest (qualifying competition)
13. (France) Édouard Roger-Vasselin (first round)
14. (Spain) Alberto Martín (second round)
15. (Ukraine) Sergiy Stakhovsky (second round)
16. (Portugal) Frederico Gil (qualified)
17. (Austria) Werner Eschauer (first round)
18. (Russia) Mikhail Kukushkin (second round)
19. (Argentina) Máximo González (qualified)
20. (Czech Republic) Jan Hernych (second round)
21. (Spain) Rubén Ramírez Hidalgo (qualifying competition)
22. (Chile) Paul Capdeville (qualified)
23. (Germany) Andreas Beck (first round)
24. (Switzerland) Stéphane Bohli (first round, retired)
25. (Russia) Andrey Golubev (first round)
26. (United States) Jesse Levine (first round)
27. (France) Nicolas Devilder (qualified)
28. (Spain) Pablo Andújar (qualifying competition, lucky loser)
29. (Uzbekistan) Denis Istomin (first round)
30. (Argentina) Diego Hartfield (second round)
31. (Serbia) Dušan Vemić (second round)
32. (Romania) Adrian Cruciat (second round)

== Qualifiers ==
1. (Argentina) Eduardo Schwank
2. (Brazil) Thomaz Bellucci
3. (Argentina) Diego Junqueira
4. (Monaco) Jean-René Lisnard
5. (Germany) Simon Greul
6. (United States) Scoville Jenkins
7. (Croatia) Roko Karanušić
8. (Spain) Miguel Ángel López Jaén
9. (Netherlands) Jesse Huta Galung
10. (Germany) Daniel Brands
11. (Romania) Victor Crivoi
12. (France) Nicolas Devilder
13. (Spain) David Marrero
14. (Argentina) Máximo González
15. (Chile) Paul Capdeville
16. (Portugal) Frederico Gil

== Lucky losers ==
1. (Peru) Luis Horna
2. (Russia) Evgeny Korolev
3. (Spain) Pablo Andújar
4. (Colombia) Santiago Giraldo
5. (France) Josselin Ouanna
6. (Argentina) Sebastián Decoud
7. (Spain) Marc López

== Qualifying draw ==
Key

- Q = Qualifier
- WC = Wild card
- LL = Lucky loser
- Alt = Alternate
- ITF = ITF entry
- PR = Protected ranking
- SR = Special ranking
- SE = Special exempt
- JE = Junior exempt
- JR = Junior Accelerator Programme entrant
- CO = College Accelerator Programme entrant
- NG = Next Gen Accelerator Program entrant
- w/o = Walkover
- r = Retired
- d = Defaulted

=== First qualifier ===
First round
1	(Argentina) Eduardo Schwank	6	1	6
(Sweden) Björn Rehnquist	1	6	3
WC	(Monaco) Benjamin Balleret	1	5
WC	(Belarus) Uladzimir Ignatik	6	7
(Serbia) Ilija Bozoljac	7	6
(Spain) Gabriel Trujillo Soler	5	4
(Russia) Mikhail Ledovskikh	7^{7}	2	1
30	(Argentina) Diego Hartfield	6^{2}	6	6

Second round
1	(Argentina) Eduardo Schwank	3	6	6
WC	(Belarus) Uladzimir Ignatik	6	1	2
(Serbia) Ilija Bozoljac	7^{9}	6^{2}	11
30	(Argentina) Diego Hartfield	6^{7}	7^{7}	9

Qualifying competition
1	(Argentina) Eduardo Schwank	7^{8}	7
(Serbia) Ilija Bozoljac	6^{6}	5

=== Second qualifier ===
First round
2	(Brazil) Thomaz Bellucci	6	6
(Austria) Martin Slanar	4	4
(Israel) Harel Levy	6^{2}	5
(Slovakia) Ivo Klec	7^{7}	7
(Czech Republic) Tomáš Zíb	6	6
(France) Laurent Recouderc	1	4
(Sweden) Filip Prpic	0	0^{r}
32	(Romania) Adrian Cruciat	6	1

Second round
2	(Brazil) Thomaz Bellucci	7^{8}	1	6
(Slovakia) Ivo Klec	6^{6}	6	4
(Czech Republic) Tomáš Zíb	3	7^{7}	6
32	(Romania) Adrian Cruciat	6	6^{5}	3

Qualifying competition
2	(Brazil) Thomaz Bellucci	6	6
(Czech Republic) Tomáš Zíb	3	3

=== Third qualifier ===
First round
3	(Peru) Luis Horna	6	6
(Czech Republic) Jan Vacek	2	4
(United States) K. J. Hippensteel	1	2
(Czech Republic) Lukáš Rosol	6	6
(Argentina) Cristian Villagrán	4	6^{2}
(Argentina) Diego Junqueira	6	7^{7}
(Greece) Konstantinos Economidis	7^{7}	5	6
17	(Austria) Werner Eschauer	6^{2}	7	3

Second round
3	(Peru) Luis Horna	6	6
(Czech Republic) Lukáš Rosol	4	4
(Argentina) Diego Junqueira	2
(Greece) Konstantinos Economidis	1^{r}

Qualifying competition
3	(Peru) Luis Horna	3	4
(Argentina) Diego Junqueira	6	6

=== Fourth qualifier ===
First round
4	(Russia) Evgeny Korolev	6	6
(Germany) Matthias Bachinger	0	4
(Switzerland) Michael Lammer	4	7^{9}	4
(France) Sébastien de Chaunac	6	6^{7}	6
(Ukraine) Oleksandr Dolgopolov Jr.	0	2^{r}
(Monaco) Jean-René Lisnard	6	4
(Australia) Joseph Sirianni	6	6
29	(Uzbekistan) Denis Istomin	3	3

Second round
4	(Russia) Evgeny Korolev	6	6^{6}	6
(France) Sébastien de Chaunac	3	7^{8}	4
(Monaco) Jean-René Lisnard	6	1	10
(Australia) Joseph Sirianni	3	6	8

Qualifying competition
4	(Russia) Evgeny Korolev	7	4	6
(Monaco) Jean-René Lisnard	5	6	8

=== Fifth qualifier ===
First round
5	(Japan) Kei Nishikori	1	6	6
(Argentina) Juan-Martín Aranguren	6	3	2
(Germany) Simon Greul	6	6
(Brazil) Júlio Silva	4	2
(Kazakhstan) Yuri Schukin	6	6
(Slovakia) Lukáš Lacko	0	1
(Belgium) Dick Norman	4	5
20	(Czech Republic) Jan Hernych	6	7

Second round
5	(Japan) Kei Nishikori	2	5
(Germany) Simon Greul	6	7
(Kazakhstan) Yuri Schukin	6	6
20	(Czech Republic) Jan Hernych	4	3

Qualifying competition
(Germany) Simon Greul	6	7^{7}
(Kazakhstan) Yuri Schukin	0	6^{1}

=== Sixth qualifier ===
First round
6	(South Africa) Kevin Anderson	7	1	6
(Germany) Dominik Meffert	5	6	3
(United States) Scoville Jenkins	6	7^{7}
(South Africa) Wesley Moodie	4	6^{3}
(Czech Republic) Lukáš Dlouhý	6^{2}	2
(Germany) Tobias Kamke	7^{7}	6
(Italy) Francesco Aldi	4	0
21	(Spain) Rubén Ramírez Hidalgo	6	6

Second round
6	(South Africa) Kevin Anderson	2	6^{6}
(United States) Scoville Jenkins	6	7^{8}
(Germany) Tobias Kamke	6	4	3
21	(Spain) Rubén Ramírez Hidalgo	4	6	6

Qualifying competition
(United States) Scoville Jenkins	6	6^{1}	9
21	(Spain) Rubén Ramírez Hidalgo	3	7^{7}	7

=== Seventh qualifier ===
First round
7	(Croatia) Roko Karanušić	6	6
(Romania) Cătălin-Ionuț Gârd	2	1
(Austria) Martin Fischer	4	7^{7}	6
WC	(France) Jonathan Dasnières de Veigy	6	6^{4}	2
(United States) Kevin Kim	3	2
(Peru) Iván Miranda	6	6
(Italy) Alberto Brizzi	3	6	6
25	(Russia) Andrey Golubev	6	4	1

Second round
7	(Croatia) Roko Karanušić	1	6	6
(Austria) Martin Fischer	6	3	3
(Peru) Iván Miranda	7^{7}	6
(Italy) Alberto Brizzi	6^{5}	3

Qualifying competition
7	(Croatia) Roko Karanušić	6	6
(Peru) Iván Miranda	3	1

=== Eighth qualifier ===
First round
8	(Argentina) Brian Dabul	6^{4}	6	4
(Spain) Miguel Ángel López Jaén	7^{7}	0	6
(United Kingdom) Alex Bogdanovic	6	6
WC	(France) Mathieu Rodrigues	0	3
(Spain) Daniel Muñoz de la Nava	6^{5}	7^{8}	5
(Brazil) Thiago Alves	7^{7}	6^{6}	7
(Spain) Adrián Menéndez-Maceiras	1	6^{6}
31	(Serbia) Dušan Vemić	6	7^{8}

Second round
(Spain) Miguel Ángel López Jaén	0	6	6
(United Kingdom) Alex Bogdanovic	6	4	1
(Brazil) Thiago Alves	6	6^{4}	6
31	(Serbia) Dušan Vemić	4	7^{7}	2

Qualifying competition
(Spain) Miguel Ángel López Jaén	7	4	6
(Brazil) Thiago Alves	5	6	1

=== Ninth qualifier ===
First round
9	(Italy) Flavio Cipolla	6^{3}	3
(Netherlands) Jesse Huta Galung	7^{7}	6
WC	(France) Julien Jeanpierre	6^{8}	6	2
(United States) Hugo Armando	7^{10}	1	6
(Canada) Frédéric Niemeyer	4	2
(Italy) Paolo Lorenzi	6	6
(Spain) Marc López	6	7
23	(Germany) Andreas Beck	4	5

Second round
(Netherlands) Jesse Huta Galung	6	6
(United States) Hugo Armando	2	0
(Italy) Paolo Lorenzi	4	3
(Spain) Marc López	6	6

Qualifying competition
(Netherlands) Jesse Huta Galung	6^{3}	7^{7}	6
(Spain) Marc López	7^{7}	6^{3}	3

=== Tenth qualifier ===
First round
10	(Chile) Nicolás Massú	6	6
(France) Gary Lugassy	3	0
(United States) Alex Bogomolov Jr.	6^{1}	0
(Germany) Daniel Brands	7^{7}	6
(Ukraine) Ivan Sergeyev	2	2
(France) Augustin Gensse	6	6
(United States) Jesse Witten	2	2
28	(Spain) Pablo Andújar	6	6

Second round
10	(Chile) Nicolás Massú	2	3
(Germany) Daniel Brands	6	6
(France) Augustin Gensse	5	7^{7}	3
28	(Spain) Pablo Andújar	7	6^{5}	6

Qualifying competition
(Germany) Daniel Brands	6	6
28	(Spain) Pablo Andújar	3	2

=== Eleventh qualifier ===
First round
11	(Belgium) Christophe Rochus	4	6	3
(Argentina) Sebastián Decoud	6	3	6
WC	(France) Alexandre Sidorenko	6	3	6
(Austria) Daniel Köllerer	3	6	4
(Spain) Pere Riba	2	2
(Romania) Victor Crivoi	6	6
(Czech Republic) Bohdan Ulihrach	6	1	6
26	(United States) Jesse Levine	4	6	1

Second round
(Argentina) Sebastián Decoud	0	6	6
WC	(France) Alexandre Sidorenko	6	4	4
(Romania) Victor Crivoi	6	6^{0}	6
(Czech Republic) Bohdan Ulihrach	4	7^{7}	4

Qualifying competition
(Argentina) Sebastián Decoud	4	4
(Romania) Victor Crivoi	6	6

=== Twelfth qualifier ===
First round
12	(South Africa) Rik de Voest	6	6
(France) Antony Dupuis	3	2
(Brazil) João Souza	6	6
(Austria) Rainer Eitzinger	3	3
(Germany) Benedikt Dorsch	6	6
(Netherlands) Matwé Middelkoop	3	4
WC	(France) Benoît Paire	3	2
27	(France) Nicolas Devilder	6	6

Second round
12	(South Africa) Rik de Voest	2	6	6
(Brazil) João Souza	6	4	4
(Germany) Benedikt Dorsch	3	4
27	(France) Nicolas Devilder	6	6

Qualifying competition
12	(South Africa) Rik de Voest	3	3
27	(France) Nicolas Devilder	6	6

=== Thirteenth qualifier ===
First round
13	(France) Édouard Roger-Vasselin	6^{3}	4
(Germany) Björn Phau	7^{7}	6
(Romania) Adrian Ungur	3	6	6
(Italy) Andrea Stoppini	6	2	2
(Spain) David Marrero	6	7
(Spain) Fernando Vicente	4	5
(Italy) Stefano Galvani	5	6^{6}
18	(Russia) Mikhail Kukushkin	7	7^{8}

Second round
(Germany) Björn Phau	6	6
(Romania) Adrian Ungur	4	2
(Spain) David Marrero	1	6	7
18	(Russia) Mikhail Kukushkin	6	3	5

Qualifying competition
(Germany) Björn Phau	3	5
(Spain) David Marrero	6	7

=== Fourteenth qualifier ===
First round
14	(Spain) Alberto Martín	6	6
(Russia) Pavel Chekhov	1	4
(Russia) Mikhail Elgin	1	0
(France) Josselin Ouanna	6	6
(Czech Republic) Jan Mertl	4	6	6
(Czech Republic) Jan Minář	6	4	2
(Colombia) Michael Quintero	3	1
19	(Argentina) Máximo González	6	6

Second round
14	(Spain) Alberto Martín	6	3	5
(France) Josselin Ouanna	2	6	7
(Czech Republic) Jan Mertl	3	4
19	(Argentina) Máximo González	6	6

Qualifying competition
(France) Josselin Ouanna	4	6	3
19	(Argentina) Máximo González	6	4	6

=== Fifteenth qualifier ===
First round
15	(Ukraine) Sergiy Stakhovsky	6	6
(Austria) Andreas Haider-Maurer	2	2
(Poland) Dawid Olejniczak	6	6
(United Kingdom) Josh Goodall	4	4
(United States) Alex Kuznetsov	2	1
(Brazil) Franco Ferreiro	6	6
WC	(France) Guillaume Rufin	2	3
22	(Chile) Paul Capdeville	6	6

Second round
15	(Ukraine) Sergiy Stakhovsky	5	4
(Poland) Dawid Olejniczak	7	6
(Brazil) Franco Ferreiro	3	6	4
22	(Chile) Paul Capdeville	6	4	6

Qualifying competition
(Poland) Dawid Olejniczak	4	3
22	(Chile) Paul Capdeville	6	6

=== Sixteenth qualifier ===
First round
16	(Portugal) Frederico Gil	6	6
WC	(France) Stéphane Piro	1	0
(Netherlands) Melle van Gemerden	4	7^{7}	0
(Germany) Simon Stadler	6	6^{3}	6
(Austria) Alexander Peya	4	3
(Colombia) Santiago Giraldo	6	6
(France) David Guez	3
24	(Switzerland) Stéphane Bohli	0^{r}

Second round
16	(Portugal) Frederico Gil	6	6
(Germany) Simon Stadler	2	4
(Colombia) Santiago Giraldo	6	6
(France) David Guez	4	4

Qualifying competition
16	(Portugal) Frederico Gil	3	7^{7}	6
(Colombia) Santiago Giraldo	6	6^{5}	2
