= 2008 Pacific Life Open – Men's singles =

Men's singles
- 2008 Pacific Life Open

Final
- Champion: (Serbia) Novak Djokovic
- Runner-up: (United States) Mardy Fish
- Score: 6–2, 5–7, 6–3

Details
- Draw: 96 (5WC/12Q/2LL)
- Seeds: 32

Events
Singles	men	women
Doubles	men	women
- Indian Wells Masters

Novak Djokovic defeated Mardy Fish in the final, 6–2, 5–7, 6–3 to win the men's singles tennis title at the 2008 Indian Wells Masters.

Rafael Nadal was the defending champion, but lost in the semifinals to Djokovic.

== Seeds ==
All seeds receive a bye into the second round.

1. (Switzerland) Roger Federer (semifinals)
2. (Spain) Rafael Nadal (semifinals)
3. (Serbia) Novak Djokovic (champion)
4. (Russia) Nikolay Davydenko (third round)
5. (Spain) David Ferrer (third round)
6. (United States) Andy Roddick (second round)
7. (Argentina) David Nalbandian (quarterfinals)
8. (France) Richard Gasquet (fourth round)
9. (United States) James Blake (quarterfinals)
10. (Czech Republic) Tomáš Berdych (second round)
11. (United Kingdom) Andy Murray (fourth round)
12. (Chile) Fernando González (second round)
13. (Russia) Mikhail Youzhny (third round)
14. (France) Paul-Henri Mathieu (third round)
15. (Spain) Tommy Robredo (third round)
16. (Argentina) Guillermo Cañas (fourth round)
17. (France) Jo-Wilfried Tsonga (fourth round)
18. (Cyprus) Marcos Baghdatis (third round)
19. (Spain) Carlos Moyá (third round)
20. (Croatia) Ivo Karlović (third round)
21. (Argentina) Juan Mónaco (third round)
22. (Spain) Juan Carlos Ferrero (fourth round)
23. (Croatia) Ivan Ljubičić (fourth round)
24. (Australia) Lleyton Hewitt (fourth round)
25. (Spain) Nicolás Almagro (second round)
26. (Finland) Jarkko Nieminen (second round)
27. (Germany) Philipp Kohlschreiber (third round)
28. (Argentina) Juan Ignacio Chela (third round)
29. (Czech Republic) Radek Štěpánek (third round)
30. (Spain) Fernando Verdasco (third round)
31. (Russia) Igor Andreev (second round)
32. (Spain) Feliciano López (second round)

== Draw ==
Key

- Q = Qualifier
- WC = Wild card
- LL = Lucky loser
- Alt = Alternate
- ITF = ITF entry
- PR = Protected ranking
- SR = Special ranking
- SE = Special exempt
- JE = Junior exempt
- JR = Junior Accelerator Programme entrant
- CO = College Accelerator Programme entrant
- NG = Next Gen Accelerator Program entrant
- w/o = Walkover
- r = Retired
- d = Defaulted

=== Finals ===
Quarterfinals
1	(Switzerland) Roger Federer	w/o
(Germany) Tommy Haas
(United States) Mardy Fish	6	6^{5}	7^{7}
7	(Argentina) David Nalbandian	3	7^{7}	6^{4}
(Switzerland) Stanislas Wawrinka	6^{5}	2
3	(Serbia) Novak Djokovic	7^{7}	6
9	(United States) James Blake	5	6	3
2	(Spain) Rafael Nadal	7	3	6

Semifinals
1	(Switzerland) Roger Federer	3	2
(United States) Mardy Fish	6	6
3	(Serbia) Novak Djokovic	6	6
2	(Spain) Rafael Nadal	3	2

Final
(United States) Mardy Fish	2	7	3
3	(Serbia) Novak Djokovic	6	5	6

=== Top half ===
==== Section 1 ====
First round
(Argentina) S Roitman	1	4
(Spain) G García López	6	6
(Russia) E Korolev	6	2	2
(France) N Mahut	3	6	6
Q	(Japan) K Nishikori	2	4
(Croatia) M Čilić	6	6
(Serbia) J Tipsarević	4	6	6^{4}
(Chile) N Massú	6	3	7^{7}

Second round
1	(Switzerland) R Federer	6	6
(Spain) G García López	3	2
(France) N Mahut	7^{7}	6
25	(Spain) N Almagro	6^{1}	2
23	(Croatia) I Ljubičić	7^{9}	7
(Croatia) M Čilić	6^{7}	5
(Chile) N Massú	4	7	6^{5}
15	(Spain) T Robredo	6	5	7^{7}

Third round
1	(Switzerland) R Federer	6	6
(France) N Mahut	1	1
23	(Croatia) I Ljubičić	6	6
15	(Spain) T Robredo	3	4

Fourth round
1	(Switzerland) R Federer	6	6
23	(Croatia) I Ljubičić	3	4

==== Section 2 ====
First round
(Austria) J Melzer	7^{7}	2	6
(Russia) M Safin	6^{5}	6	2
Q	(South Africa) R de Voest	7^{7}	7
(Germany) M Berrer	6^{4}	5
(Romania) V Hănescu	1	6	6
(Spain) A Montañés	6	4	4
(Germany) T Haas	3	6	6
(France) J Benneteau	6	0	2

Second round
11	(United Kingdom) A Murray	3	6	6
(Austria) J Melzer	6	3	3
Q	(South Africa) R de Voest	3	6^{2}
20	(Croatia) I Karlović	6	7^{7}
30	(Spain) F Verdasco	4	6	6
(Romania) V Hănescu	6	4	3
(Germany) T Haas	6	6
6	(United States) A Roddick	4	4

Third round
11	(United Kingdom) A Murray	7^{9}	6^{3}	6
20	(Croatia) I Karlović	6^{7}	7^{7}	3
30	(Spain) F Verdasco	6^{5}	6	1
(Germany) T Haas	7^{7}	4	6

Fourth round
11	(United Kingdom) A Murray	6	5	3
(Germany) T Haas	2	7	6

==== Section 3 ====
First round
(Italy) S Bolelli	3	7^{7}	6^{2}
WC	(United States) J Isner	6	6^{5}	7^{7}
(Germany) F Mayer	5	4
(United States) M Fish	7	6
(Peru) L Horna	6^{5}	3
(United States) S Querrey	7^{7}	6
(France) G Simon	6	6
(Argentina) C Berlocq	2	3

Second round
4	(Russia) N Davydenko	6	7^{7}
WC	(United States) J Isner	2	6^{3}
(United States) M Fish	6	6
31	(Russia) I Andreev	4	3
24	(Australia) L Hewitt	6	6
(United States) S Querrey	4	3
(France) G Simon	5	4
13	(Russia) M Youzhny	7	6

Third round
4	(Russia) N Davydenko	3	2
(United States) M Fish	6	6
24	(Australia) L Hewitt	7	6
13	(Russia) M Youzhny	5	1

Fourth round
(United States) M Fish	7	3	7^{7}
24	(Australia) L Hewitt	5	6	6^{4}

==== Section 4 ====
First round
WC	(Croatia) M Ančić	6	6
(France) G Monfils	3	2
(Sweden) T Johansson	6	6^{2}	6
Q	(Chinese Taipei) Y-h Lu	4	7^{7}	4
(Argentina) J Acasuso	5	5
Q	(Belarus) M Mirnyi	7	7
(Spain) Ó Hernández	2	1
(Latvia) E Gulbis	6	6

Second round
12	(Chile) F González	5	6	3
WC	(Croatia) M Ančić	7	3	6
(Sweden) T Johansson	4	4
22	(Spain) JC Ferrero	6	6
29	(Czech Republic) R Štěpánek	6	6
Q	(Belarus) M Mirnyi	4	2
(Latvia) E Gulbis	4	6	6^{4}
7	(Argentina) D Nalbandian	6	4	7^{7}

Third round
WC	(Croatia) M Ančić	5	6	6^{7}
22	(Spain) JC Ferrero	7	4	7^{9}
29	(Czech Republic) R Štěpánek	6^{1}	6	6^{6}
7	(Argentina) D Nalbandian	7^{7}	0	7^{8}

Fourth round
22	(Spain) JC Ferrero	2	2
7	(Argentina) D Nalbandian	6	6

=== Bottom half ===
==== Section 5 ====
First round
(France) A Clément	4	4
(Belgium) O Rochus	6	6
(South Korea) H-t Lee	6	6
(France) M Llodra	2	3
Q	(Russia) I Kunitsyn	6	6^{3}	3
Q	(United States) W Odesnik	2	7^{7}	6
WC	(United States) J Levine	5	6	4
(Switzerland) S Wawrinka	7	4	6

Second round
5	(Spain) D Ferrer	6	6
(Belgium) O Rochus	2	2
(South Korea) H-t Lee	4	7^{7}	6
26	(Finland) J Nieminen	6	6^{5}	3
18	(Cyprus) M Baghdatis	7^{7}	1	6
Q	(United States) W Odesnik	6^{2}	6	3
(Switzerland) S Wawrinka	2	7^{7}	6
10	(Czech Republic) T Berdych	6	6^{3}	4

Third round
5	(Spain) D Ferrer	6^{5}	7^{7}	6^{3}
(South Korea) H-t Lee	7^{7}	6^{5}	7^{7}
18	(Cyprus) M Baghdatis	3	7^{7}	0
(Switzerland) S Wawrinka	6	6^{1}	6

Fourth round
(South Korea) H-t Lee	1	7	4
(Switzerland) S Wawrinka	6	5	6

==== Section 6 ====
First round
(Italy) F Volandri	3	6^{5}
(Sweden) J Björkman	6	7^{7}
Q	(Serbia) D Vemic	6	3	2
Q	(Netherlands) R Haase	3	6	6
(Belgium) X Malisse	6^{5}	6	6
Q	(France) F Serra	7^{7}	2	0
(Italy) A Seppi	4	7^{7}	6
Q	(Chile) P Capdeville	6	6^{3}	2

Second round
16	(Argentina) G Cañas	6	7^{7}
(Sweden) J Björkman	2	6^{4}
Q	(Netherlands) R Haase	2	4
21	(Argentina) J Mónaco	6	6
27	(Germany) P Kohlschreiber	6	5	6
(Belgium) X Malisse	2	7	4
(Italy) A Seppi	3	6^{3}
3	(Serbia) N Djokovic	6	7^{7}

Third round
16	(Argentina) G Cañas	6	6^{1}	6
21	(Argentina) J Mónaco	3	7^{7}	2
27	(Germany) P Kohlschreiber	3	2
3	(Serbia) N Djokovic	6	6

Fourth round
16	(Argentina) G Cañas	2	3
3	(Serbia) N Djokovic	6	6

==== Section 7 ====
First round
(France) S Grosjean	3	3
(Sweden) R Söderling	6	6
(Russia) D Tursunov	7^{7}	6
(Germany) B Becker	6^{4}	3
WC	(United States) R Ginepri	6	6
(United States) V Spadea	1	1
(Italy) P Starace	4	3
(France) M Gicquel	6	6

Second round
8	(France) R Gasquet	6	6
(Sweden) R Söderling	3	2
(Russia) D Tursunov	7^{7}	6^{6}	4
28	(Argentina) JI Chela	6^{1}	7^{8}	6
19	(Spain) C Moyá	2	6	6
WC	(United States) R Ginepri	6	2	4
(France) M Gicquel	3	7^{7}	1
9	(United States) J Blake	6	6^{5}	6

Third round
8	(France) R Gasquet	6	6
28	(Argentina) JI Chela	2	1
19	(Spain) C Moyá	3	4
9	(United States) J Blake	6	6

Fourth round
8	(France) R Gasquet	4	2
9	(United States) J Blake	6	6

==== Section 8 ====
First round
LL	(Italy) F Fognini	2	6	6
LL	(Germany) R Schüttler	6	3	3
(Israel) D Sela	6	6^{4}	6
(Germany) N Kiefer	4	7^{7}	3
Q	(United States) B Reynolds	3	4
WC	(United States) D Young	6	6
Q	(Colombia) S Giraldo	7^{7}	6
(Austria) W Eschauer	6^{5}	4

Second round
14	(France) P-H Mathieu	6	7^{9}
LL	(Italy) F Fognini	1	6^{7}
(Israel) D Sela	2	4
17	(France) J-W Tsonga	6	6
32	(Spain) F López	4	7^{7}	2
WC	(United States) D Young	6	6^{3}	6
Q	(Colombia) S Giraldo	3	3
2	(Spain) R Nadal	6	6

Third round
14	(France) P-H Mathieu	6^{5}	4
17	(France) J-W Tsonga	7^{7}	6
WC	(United States) D Young	1	3
2	(Spain) R Nadal	6	6

Fourth round
17	(France) J-W Tsonga	7^{7}	6^{3}	5
2	(Spain) R Nadal	6^{4}	7^{7}	7

== Qualifying ==
=== Qualifying seeds ===
1. (Australia) Peter Luczak (first round)
2. (Australia) Chris Guccione (first round)
3. (Italy) Fabio Fognini (qualifying competition, Lucky Loser)
4. (Germany) Mischa Zverev (first round)
5. (Netherlands) Robin Haase (qualified)
6. (Germany) Rainer Schüttler (qualifying competition, Lucky Loser)
7. (France) Florent Serra (qualified)
8. (Ecuador) Nicolás Lapentti (first round)
9. (United States) Bobby Reynolds (qualified)
10. (United States) Amer Delić (first round)
11. (Russia) Teymuraz Gabashvili (first round)
12. (Chinese Taipei) Lu Yen-hsun (qualified)
13. (Chile) Paul Capdeville (qualified)
14. (United States) Robert Kendrick (qualifying competition)
15. (Russia) Igor Kunitsyn (qualified)
16. (South Africa) Kevin Anderson (qualifying competition)
17. (United States) Wayne Odesnik (qualified)
18. (Japan) Kei Nishikori (qualified)
19. (Australia) Alun Jones (first round)
20. (South Africa) Rik de Voest (qualified)
21. (Colombia) Santiago Giraldo (qualified)
22. (Switzerland) Stéphane Bohli (qualifying competition)
23. (United States) Kevin Kim (first round)
24. (Serbia) Dušan Vemić (qualified)

=== Qualifiers ===
1. (Russia) Igor Kunitsyn
2. (Chile) Paul Capdeville
3. (United States) Wayne Odesnik
4. (Serbia) Dušan Vemić
5. (Netherlands) Robin Haase
6. (Colombia) Santiago Giraldo
7. (France) Florent Serra
8. (Japan) Kei Nishikori
9. (United States) Bobby Reynolds
10. (South Africa) Rik de Voest
11. (Belarus) Max Mirnyi
12. (Chinese Taipei) Lu Yen-hsun

=== Lucky losers ===
1. (Italy) Fabio Fognini
2. (Germany) Rainer Schüttler

=== Qualifying draw ===
==== First qualifier ====
First round
1	(Australia) Peter Luczak	6^{5}	4
(South Africa) Wesley Moodie	7^{7}	6
(Czech Republic) Jan Hernych	1	3
15	(Russia) Igor Kunitsyn	6	6

Qualifying competition
(South Africa) Wesley Moodie	3	2
15	(Russia) Igor Kunitsyn	6	6

==== Second qualifier ====
First round
2	(Australia) Chris Guccione	6^{3}	3
(United States) Brendan Evans	7^{7}	6
(Netherlands) Jesse Huta Galung	2	2
13	(Chile) Paul Capdeville	6	6

Qualifying competition
(United States) Brendan Evans	7^{7}	1	4
13	(Chile) Paul Capdeville	6^{3}	6	6

==== Third qualifier ====
First round
3	(Italy) Fabio Fognini	0	7^{7}	6
(United States) Sam Warburg	6	6^{2}	2
(Slovakia) Dominik Hrbatý	1	0
17	(United States) Wayne Odesnik	6	6

Qualifying competition
3	(Italy) Fabio Fognini	1	2
17	(United States) Wayne Odesnik	6	6

==== Fourth qualifier ====
First round
4	(Germany) Mischa Zverev	6	3	2
(United States) Scoville Jenkins	4	6	6
WC	(United States) Michael McClune	7^{7}	4	4
24	(Serbia) Dušan Vemić	6^{4}	6	6

Qualifying competition
(United States) Scoville Jenkins	4	6	6^{3}
24	(Serbia) Dušan Vemić	6	3	7^{7}

==== Fifth qualifier ====
First round
5	(Netherlands) Robin Haase	6	4	7
(Israel) Harel Levy	1	6	5
(Greece) Konstantinos Economidis	4	3
16	(South Africa) Kevin Anderson	6	6

Qualifying competition
5	(Netherlands) Robin Haase	6	6^{7}	6
16	(South Africa) Kevin Anderson	1	7^{9}	4

==== Sixth qualifier ====
First round
6	(Germany) Rainer Schüttler	6	6
(Australia) Joseph Sirianni	4	2
(Chile) Adrián García	3	2
21	(Colombia) Santiago Giraldo	6	6

Qualifying competition
6	(Germany) Rainer Schüttler	5	5
21	(Colombia) Santiago Giraldo	7	7

==== Seventh qualifier ====
First round
7	(France) Florent Serra	7^{9}	6
WC	(United Kingdom) Jamie Baker	6^{7}	1
WC	(United States) Ryan Sweeting	7^{10}	6
19	(Australia) Alun Jones	6^{8}	2

Qualifying competition
7	(France) Florent Serra	6	6
WC	(United States) Ryan Sweeting	4	4

==== Eighth qualifier ====
First round
8	(Ecuador) Nicolás Lapentti	3	6^{4}
(Canada) Frédéric Niemeyer	6	7^{7}
(United Kingdom) Alex Bogdanovic	4	6	5
18	(Japan) Kei Nishikori	6	4	7

Qualifying competition
(Canada) Frédéric Niemeyer	7	5	4
18	(Japan) Kei Nishikori	5	7	6

==== Ninth qualifier ====
First round
9	(United States) Bobby Reynolds	6	6
(France) Laurent Recouderc	0	4
(Slovakia) Ivo Klec	6	1	1
14	(United States) Robert Kendrick	4	6	6

Qualifying competition
9	(United States) Bobby Reynolds	7^{7}	7^{9}
14	(United States) Robert Kendrick	6^{3}	6^{7}

==== Tenth qualifier ====
First round
10	(United States) Amer Delić	2	6	3
(Germany) Dominik Meffert	6	3	6
(Czech Republic) Lukáš Dlouhý	3	1
20	(South Africa) Rik de Voest	6	6

Qualifying competition
(Germany) Dominik Meffert	6	4	3
20	(South Africa) Rik de Voest	4	6	6

==== Eleventh qualifier ====
First round
11	(Russia) Teymuraz Gabashvili	5	7^{7}	4
(Belarus) Max Mirnyi	7	6^{5}	6
(France) Mathieu Montcourt	1	6	6
23	(United States) Kevin Kim	6	3	4

Qualifying competition
(Belarus) Max Mirnyi	7	7
(France) Mathieu Montcourt	5	5

==== Twelfth qualifier ====
First round
12	(Chinese Taipei) Lu Yen-hsun	6	6
WC	(Moldova) Roman Borvanov	2	1
WC	(United States) Ryan Thacher	4	6^{7}
22	(Switzerland) Stéphane Bohli	6	7^{9}

Qualifying competition
12	(Chinese Taipei) Lu Yen-hsun	6	3	6
22	(Switzerland) Stéphane Bohli	4	6	2
