= 2008 Internationaux de Nouvelle-Calédonie – Singles =

Singles
- 2008 Internationaux de Nouvelle-Calédonie

Final
- Champion: (Italy) Flavio Cipolla
- Runner-up: (Switzerland) Stéphane Bohli
- Score: 6–4, 7–5

Events
Singles	Doubles
← 2007 ·	Internationaux de Nouvelle-Calédonie	· 2009 →

Michael Russell was the defending champion but chose not to defend his title.

Flavio Cipolla won the title after defeating Stéphane Bohli 6–4, 7–5 in the final.

== Seeds ==
1. (France) Nicolas Devilder (first round)
2. (Italy) Flavio Cipolla (champion)
3. (United States) Kevin Kim (first round)
4. (France) David Guez (semifinals)
5. (United Kingdom) Alex Bogdanovic (second round)
6. (France) Jérémy Chardy (first round)
7. (Czech Republic) Jan Mertl (first round)
8. (France) Laurent Recouderc (second round)

== Draw ==
=== Key ===
- Q = Qualifier
- WC = Wild card
- LL = Lucky loser
- Alt = Alternate
- SE = Special exempt
- PR = Protected ranking
- ITF = ITF entry
- JE = Junior exempt
- w/o = Walkover
- r = Retired
- d = Defaulted
- SR = Special ranking

=== Finals ===
Semifinals
(Switzerland) Stéphane Bohli	0	6	6
WC	(Monaco) Jean-René Lisnard	6	2	4
4	(France) David Guez	2	3
2	(Italy) Flavio Cipolla	6	6

Final
(Switzerland) Stéphane Bohli	4	5
2	(Italy) Flavio Cipolla	6	7

=== Top half ===
First round
1	(France) N Devilder	2	6^{3}
(Switzerland) S Bohli	6	7^{7}
(United States) R Sweeting	6^{8}	6	2
(Spain) A Menéndez	7^{10}	1	0^{r}
(Italy) S Vagnozzi	7^{7}	1	3
(South Africa) K Anderson	6^{5}	6	6
(France) T Oger	2	6^{3}
5	(United Kingdom) A Bogdanovic	6	7^{7}
3	(United States) K Kim	4	6	2
(France) A Gensse	6	4	6
Q	(France) Yvonick Rivat	1	1
WC	(France) N N'Godrela	6	6
Q	(France) Anthony Azcoaga	0	0
WC	(Monaco) J-R Lisnard	6	6
WC	(France) M Chazal	0	0
8	(France) L Recouderc	6	6

Second round
(Switzerland) S Bohli	7^{7}	6
(United States) R Sweeting	6^{3}	4
(South Africa) K Anderson	6	6
5	(United Kingdom) A Bogdanovic	4	4
(France) A Gensse	6	6
WC	(France) N N'Godrela	4	4
WC	(Monaco) J-R Lisnard	7^{7}	6
8	(France) L Recouderc	6^{3}	1

Quarterfinals
(Switzerland) S Bohli	7	6
(South Africa) K Anderson	5	3
(France) A Gensse	4	2
WC	(Monaco) J-R Lisnard	6	6

Semifinals
(Switzerland) S Bohli	0	6	6
WC	(Monaco) J-R Lisnard	6	2	4

=== Bottom half ===
First round
6	(France) J Chardy	6	5	3
(Italy) P Lorenzi	3	7	6
(France) J Ouanna	6	6
(New Zealand) D King-Turner	4	2
(United States) S Jenkins	6	6
Q	(France) Philippe Poignon	4	1
WC	(Japan) Norikazu Sugiyama	3	1
4	(France) D Guez	6	6
7	(Czech Republic) J Mertl	4	5
(United States) K. J. Hippensteel	6	7
Q	(France) Aurélien David	1	1
(Uzbekistan) D Istomin	6	6
(Czech Republic) T Cakl	3	2
(Austria) M Slanar	6	6
(Israel) N Okun	2	4
2	(Italy) F Cipolla	6	6

Second round
(Italy) P Lorenzi	3	7^{9}	4
(France) J Ouanna	6	6^{7}	6
(United States) S Jenkins	3	1
4	(France) D Guez	6	6
(United States) K. J. Hippensteel	1	3
(Uzbekistan) D Istomin	6	6
(Austria) M Slanar	2	5
2	(Italy) F Cipolla	6	7

Quarterfinals
(France) J Ouanna	3	7^{7}	0
4	(France) D Guez	6	6^{3}	6
(Uzbekistan) D Istomin	4	6	4
2	(Italy) F Cipolla	6	4	6

Semifinals
4	(France) D Guez	2	3
2	(Italy) F Cipolla	6	6
