= 2008 Australian Open – Men's singles qualifying =

Men's singles qualifying
- 2008 Australian Open

Events
Singles	men	women		boys	girls
Doubles	men	women	mixed	boys	girls
WC Singles	men	women	quad
WC Doubles	men	women	quad
Legends	men	women	mixed

Qualification
Singles	men	women
- Australian Open

This article displays the qualifying draw for the Men's singles at the 2008 Australian Open.

== Seeds ==
1. (Netherlands) Robin Haase (qualified)
2. (United States) Bobby Reynolds (moved to main draw)
3. (France) Nicolas Devilder (second round)
4. (Luxembourg) Gilles Müller (first round)
5. (Italy) Flavio Cipolla (second round)
6. (South Africa) Rik de Voest (second round)
7. (Germany) Denis Gremelmayr (qualified)
8. (Argentina) Máximo González (first round)
9. (Russia) Yuri Schukin (first round)
10. (Spain) Iván Navarro (first round)
11. (United States) Wayne Odesnik (qualified)
12. (Russia) Teimuraz Gabashvili (first round)
13. (Serbia) Viktor Troicki (qualified)
14. (Russia) Igor Kunitsyn (qualifying competition)
15. (Denmark) Kristian Pless (first round)
16. (Pakistan) Aisam-ul-Haq Qureshi (first round)
17. (Spain) Marcel Granollers (qualified)
18. (United States) Robby Ginepri (first round)
19. (Croatia) Roko Karanušić (qualified)
20. (United States) Amer Delić (qualified)
21. (Spain) Alberto Martín (second round)
22. (Greece) Konstantinos Economidis (qualified)
23. (Italy) Federico Luzzi (second round)
24. (United States) Zack Fleishman (first round)
25. (Chinese Taipei) Jimmy Wang (first round)
26. (Austria) Oliver Marach (first round)
27. (Slovakia) Lukáš Lacko (qualified)
28. (Thailand) Danai Udomchoke (qualifying competition)
29. (Czech Republic) Lukáš Dlouhý (qualified)
30. (Israel) Harel Levy (qualified)
31. (Austria) Daniel Köllerer (qualifying competition)
32. (South Africa) Wesley Moodie (first round)

== Qualifiers ==
1. (Netherlands) Robin Haase
2. (Czech Republic) Lukáš Dlouhý
3. (Croatia) Roko Karanušić
4. (South Africa) Kevin Anderson
5. (United States) Amer Delić
6. (United States) Sam Warburg
7. (Germany) Denis Gremelmayr
8. (Slovakia) Lukáš Lacko
9. (United Kingdom) Jamie Baker
10. (Israel) Harel Levy
11. (United States) Wayne Odesnik
12. (Austria) Martin Slanar
13. (Serbia) Viktor Troicki
14. (Spain) Marcel Granollers
15. (United States) Rajeev Ram
16. (Greece) Konstantinos Economidis

== Qualifying draw ==
Key

- Q = Qualifier
- WC = Wild card
- LL = Lucky loser
- Alt = Alternate
- ITF = ITF entry
- PR = Protected ranking
- SR = Special ranking
- SE = Special exempt
- JE = Junior exempt
- JR = Junior Accelerator Programme entrant
- CO = College Accelerator Programme entrant
- NG = Next Gen Accelerator Program entrant
- w/o = Walkover
- r = Retired
- d = Defaulted

=== First qualifier ===
First round
1	(Netherlands) Robin Haase	6	7
(Japan) Go Soeda	2	5
(United States) Scott Oudsema	7^{7}	6^{4}	4
(Germany) Julian Reister	6^{4}	7^{7}	6
(Czech Republic) Pavel Šnobel	6^{1}	1
(Germany) Simon Stadler	7^{7}	6
(United Kingdom) Alex Bogdanovic	6	6
18	(United States) Robby Ginepri	3	1

Second round
1	(Netherlands) Robin Haase	7^{7}	6
(Germany) Julian Reister	6^{2}	3
(Germany) Simon Stadler	1	6	7
(United Kingdom) Alex Bogdanovic	6	4	5

Qualifying competition
1	(Netherlands) Robin Haase	6	7
(Germany) Simon Stadler	2	5

=== Second qualifier ===
First round
Alt	(France) Jérémy Chardy	6	1	9
(Chinese Taipei) Chen Ti	3	6	11
(United States) Alex Kuznetsov	6	6
PR	(Czech Republic) Adam Vejmělka	3	2
WC	(Australia) Greg Jones	6	7^{12}
(Italy) Alberto Brizzi	4	6^{10}
Alt	(Republic of Ireland) Conor Niland	6	2	6
29	(Czech Republic) Lukáš Dlouhý	4	6	8

Second round
(Chinese Taipei) Chen Ti	7	7
(United States) Alex Kuznetsov	5	5
WC	(Australia) Greg Jones	1	6	3
29	(Czech Republic) Lukáš Dlouhý	6	4	6

Qualifying competition
(Chinese Taipei) Chen Ti	2	1
29	(Czech Republic) Lukáš Dlouhý	6	6

=== Third qualifier ===
First round
3	(France) Nicolas Devilder	6	3	11
(Spain) Adrián Menéndez-Maceiras	3	6	9
(Russia) Alexander Kudryavtsev	6	6
(Belgium) Christophe Rochus	4	4
(Spain) Miguel Ángel López Jaén	6	6
(Slovakia) Michal Mertiňák	4	4
(Germany) Tobias Kamke	4	1
19	(Croatia) Roko Karanušić	6	6

Second round
3	(France) Nicolas Devilder	2	5
(Russia) Alexander Kudryavtsev	6	7
(Spain) Miguel Ángel López Jaén	0	1
19	(Croatia) Roko Karanušić	6	6

Qualifying competition
(Russia) Alexander Kudryavtsev	1	2
19	(Croatia) Roko Karanušić	6	6

=== Fourth qualifier ===
First round
4	(Luxembourg) Gilles Müller	6^{7}	6^{1}
(Czech Republic) Jan Mertl	7^{9}	7^{7}
(Germany) Dominik Meffert	6	6
WC	(Australia) Andrew Thomas	1	0
(South Africa) Kevin Anderson	7^{8}	6^{4}	6
(Colombia) Michael Quintero	6^{6}	7^{7}	2
WC	(Australia) Sam Groth	6^{6}	6	6
32	(South Africa) Wesley Moodie	7^{8}	4	4

Second round
(Czech Republic) Jan Mertl	4	6	6
(Germany) Dominik Meffert	6	3	4
(South Africa) Kevin Anderson	6	6
WC	(Australia) Sam Groth	4	2

Qualifying competition
(Czech Republic) Jan Mertl	6	6^{5}	4
(South Africa) Kevin Anderson	3	7^{7}	6

=== Fifth qualifier ===
First round
5	(Italy) Flavio Cipolla	6	4	6
WC	(Australia) Matthew Ebden	3	6	3
(Australia) Rameez Junaid	5	6^{3}
(United States) Kevin Kim	7	7^{7}
(France) Augustin Gensse	0	5
(Italy) Francesco Aldi	6	7
(United States) Ryan Sweeting	4	5
20	(United States) Amer Delić	6	7

Second round
5	(Italy) Flavio Cipolla	5	2
(United States) Kevin Kim	7	6
(Italy) Francesco Aldi	6^{5}	4
20	(United States) Amer Delić	7^{7}	6

Qualifying competition
(United States) Kevin Kim	4	4
20	(United States) Amer Delić	6	6

=== Sixth qualifier ===
First round
6	(South Africa) Rik de Voest	7	4	6
(Romania) Cătălin-Ionuț Gârd	5	6	3
(Ukraine) Oleksandr Dolgopolov Jr.	7	6
(Argentina) Sebastián Decoud	5	3
(India) Rohan Bopanna	6	6
(Japan) Gouichi Motomura	3	4
(United States) Sam Warburg	6	7^{7}
24	(United States) Zack Fleishman	2	6^{3}

Second round
6	(South Africa) Rik de Voest	4	6	4
(Ukraine) Oleksandr Dolgopolov Jr.	6	4	6
(India) Rohan Bopanna	3	6^{9}
(United States) Sam Warburg	6	7^{11}

Qualifying competition
(Ukraine) Oleksandr Dolgopolov Jr.	7	6^{5}	12
(United States) Sam Warburg	5	7^{7}	14

=== Seventh qualifier ===
First round
7	(Germany) Denis Gremelmayr	6	6
(Argentina) Juan-Martín Aranguren	3	2
(Argentina) Gustavo Marcaccio	2	1
(Austria) Martin Fischer	6	6
(India) Prakash Amritraj	6	7
(United States) Hugo Armando	4	5
WC	(Australia) Bernard Tomic	4	7^{15}	7
25	(Chinese Taipei) Jimmy Wang	6	6^{13}	5

Second round
7	(Germany) Denis Gremelmayr	6	6^{5}	9
(Austria) Martin Fischer	4	7^{7}	7
(India) Prakash Amritraj	6	6
WC	(Australia) Bernard Tomic	3	2

Qualifying competition
7	(Germany) Denis Gremelmayr	6	6
(India) Prakash Amritraj	2	4

=== Eighth qualifier ===
First round
8	(Argentina) Máximo González	3	2
(Russia) Mikhail Ledovskikh	6	6
WC	(Australia) Adam Feeney	7^{7}	6
(Germany) Benedikt Dorsch	6^{0}	2
(Germany) Björn Phau	2	4
(Slovakia) Ivo Klec	6	6
(Germany) Alexander Waske	6	6^{2r}
27	(Slovakia) Lukáš Lacko	4	6^{6}

Second round
(Russia) Mikhail Ledovskikh	4	7^{7}	9
WC	(Australia) Adam Feeney	6	6^{1}	7
(Slovakia) Ivo Klec	6	6^{5}	1
27	(Slovakia) Lukáš Lacko	3	7^{7}	6

Qualifying competition
(Russia) Mikhail Ledovskikh	4	1
27	(Slovakia) Lukáš Lacko	6	6

=== Ninth qualifier ===
First round
9	(Russia) Yuri Schukin	2	0
(United Kingdom) Jamie Baker	6	6
(Slovenia) Marko Tkalec	4	7^{7}	4
(Austria) Alexander Peya	6	6^{5}	6
(France) Thomas Oger	7	7
(South Africa) Fritz Wolmarans	5	5
(Romania) Adrian Ungur	0	4
31	(Austria) Daniel Köllerer	6	6

Second round
(United Kingdom) Jamie Baker	6	7^{7}
(Austria) Alexander Peya	4	6^{4}
(France) Thomas Oger	1	4
31	(Austria) Daniel Köllerer	6	6

Qualifying competition
(United Kingdom) Jamie Baker	6	6
31	(Austria) Daniel Köllerer	4	4

=== Tenth qualifier ===
First round
10	(Spain) Iván Navarro	7^{7}	5	3
(Russia) Andrey Golubev	6^{4}	7	6
(United States) Brian Wilson	2	2
(United States) Scoville Jenkins	6	6
(Israel) Noam Okun	5	5
(Latvia) Andis Juška	7	0^{r}
(Germany) Daniel Brands	4	6	5
30	(Israel) Harel Levy	6	3	7

Second round
(Russia) Andrey Golubev	1	3
(United States) Scoville Jenkins	6	6
(Israel) Noam Okun	3	4
30	(Israel) Harel Levy	6	6

Qualifying competition
(United States) Scoville Jenkins	6^{4}	3
30	(Israel) Harel Levy	7^{7}	6

=== Eleventh qualifier ===
First round
11	(United States) Wayne Odesnik	6	6
(Sweden) Filip Prpic	2	1
(Netherlands) Jesse Huta Galung	6	7
(United States) Phillip King	4	5
(Germany) Philipp Petzschner	6^{5}	4
PR	(United States) K. J. Hippensteel	7^{7}	6
(United States) Brendan Evans	5	6	9
21	(Spain) Alberto Martín	7	2	11

Second round
11	(United States) Wayne Odesnik	6	6
(Netherlands) Jesse Huta Galung	3	0
PR	(United States) K. J. Hippensteel	6	7^{7}
21	(Spain) Alberto Martín	2	6^{3}

Qualifying competition
11	(United States) Wayne Odesnik	4	6	6
PR	(United States) K. J. Hippensteel	6	2	2

=== Twelfth qualifier ===
First round
12	(Russia) Teimuraz Gabashvili	5	4
(Czech Republic) Lukáš Rosol	7	6
(Poland) Dawid Olejniczak	5	4
(France) Josselin Ouanna	7	6
(Australia) Nathan Healey	6	6
(Spain) Gabriel Trujillo Soler	2	1
(Austria) Martin Slanar	7^{8}	6
26	(Austria) Oliver Marach	6^{6}	4

Second round
(Czech Republic) Lukáš Rosol	3	4
(France) Josselin Ouanna	6	6
(Australia) Nathan Healey	6^{5}	6^{4}
(Austria) Martin Slanar	7^{7}	7^{7}

Qualifying competition
(France) Josselin Ouanna	6^{2}	3
(Austria) Martin Slanar	7^{7}	6

=== Thirteenth qualifier ===
First round
13	(Serbia) Viktor Troicki	3	6	6
(France) Gary Lugassy	6	0	4
(Switzerland) Michael Lammer	1	7	6
WC	(Australia) Miles Armstrong	6	5	3
(Italy) Paolo Lorenzi	2	4
(Netherlands) Matwé Middelkoop	6	6
(Sweden) Michael Ryderstedt	3	6	3
23	(Italy) Federico Luzzi	6	1	6

Second round
13	(Serbia) Viktor Troicki	6	6
(Switzerland) Michael Lammer	2	1
(Netherlands) Matwé Middelkoop	6	7^{7}
12	(Italy) Federico Luzzi	3	6^{1}

Qualifying competition
13	(Serbia) Viktor Troicki	5	6	6
(Netherlands) Matwé Middelkoop	7	3	2

=== Fourteenth qualifier ===
First round
14	(Russia) Igor Kunitsyn	6	6
(Czech Republic) Jan Minář	4	3
(France) David Guez	7	5	1
(Sweden) Björn Rehnquist	5	7	6
(Italy) Stefano Galvani	6	6
(Romania) Adrian Cruciat	1	4
(Germany) Matthias Bachinger	2	2
17	(Spain) Marcel Granollers	6	6

Second round
14	(Russia) Igor Kunitsyn	6	6
(Sweden) Björn Rehnquist	3	3
(Italy) Stefano Galvani	6	5	4
17	(Spain) Marcel Granollers	4	7	6

Qualifying competition
14	(Russia) Igor Kunitsyn	6^{5}	6	6
17	(Spain) Marcel Granollers	7^{7}	4	8

=== Fifteenth qualifier ===
First round
15	(Denmark) Kristian Pless	3	6^{8}
WC	(Australia) Carsten Ball	6	7^{10}
(United States) Rajeev Ram	6	6
(Ukraine) Sergiy Stakhovsky	3	3
(France) Antony Dupuis	6	3	8
(Australia) Colin Ebelthite	4	6	6
(Japan) Takao Suzuki	3	3
28	(Thailand) Danai Udomchoke	6	6

Second round
WC	(Australia) Carsten Ball	4	5
(United States) Rajeev Ram	6	7
(France) Antony Dupuis	2	6	4
28	(Thailand) Danai Udomchoke	6	2	6

Qualifying competition
(United States) Rajeev Ram	6^{1}	7	6
28	(Thailand) Danai Udomchoke	7^{7}	5	2

=== Sixteenth qualifier ===
First round
16	(Pakistan) Aisam-ul-Haq Qureshi	7	3	3
(Switzerland) Stéphane Bohli	5	6	6
(Canada) Frédéric Niemeyer	4	0
(Italy) Simone Vagnozzi	6	6
WC	(Australia) Andrew Coelho	2	3
(France) Laurent Recouderc	6	6
(Uzbekistan) Farrukh Dustov	3	4
22	(Greece) Konstantinos Economidis	6	6

Second round
(Switzerland) Stéphane Bohli	6	5	6
(Italy) Simone Vagnozzi	1	7	4
(France) Laurent Recouderc	1	4
22	(Greece) Konstantinos Economidis	6	6

Qualifying competition
(Switzerland) Stéphane Bohli	7	3	2
22	(Greece) Konstantinos Economidis	5	6	6
