= 2008 Internationaux de Nouvelle-Calédonie =

- Date: 1–6 January
- Edition: 5th
- Draw: 32S / 16D
- Surface: Hard
- Location: Nouméa, New Caledonia

Champions

Singles
- (Italy) Flavio Cipolla

Doubles
- (Italy) Flavio Cipolla / (Italy) Simone Vagnozzi
← 2007 ·	Internationaux de Nouvelle-Calédonie	· 2009 →

The 2008 Internationaux de Nouvelle-Calédonie was a professional tennis tournament played on hard courts. It was the fifth edition of the tournament which was part of the 2008 ATP Challenger Series. It took place in Nouméa, New Caledonia between 1–6 January 2008.

== Singles main-draw entrants ==
=== Seeds ===
Country	Player	Rank^{1}	Seed
FRA	Nicolas Devilder	115	1
ITA	Flavio Cipolla	142	2
USA	Kevin Kim	178	3
FRA	David Guez	184	4
GBR	Alex Bogdanovic	190	5
FRA	Jérémy Chardy	192	6
CZE	Jan Mertl	196	7
FRA	Laurent Recouderc	213	8

- ^{1} Rankings are as of 24 December 2007.

=== Other entrants ===
The following players received wildcards into the singles main draw:

- (France) Maxime Chazal
- (Monaco) Jean-René Lisnard
- (France) Nicolas N'Godrela
- (Japan) Norikazu Sugiyama

The following players received entry from the qualifying draw:

- (France) Anthony Azcoaga
- (France) Aurélien David
- (France) Philippe Poignon
- (France) Yvonick Rivat

== Champions ==
=== Singles ===
- (Italy) Flavio Cipolla def. (Switzerland) Stéphane Bohli 6–4, 7–5.

=== Doubles ===
- (Italy) Flavio Cipolla / (Italy) Simone Vagnozzi def. (Czech Republic) Jan Mertl / (Austria) Martin Slanar 6–4, 6–4.
