= Roko Karanušić =

Croatian tennis player

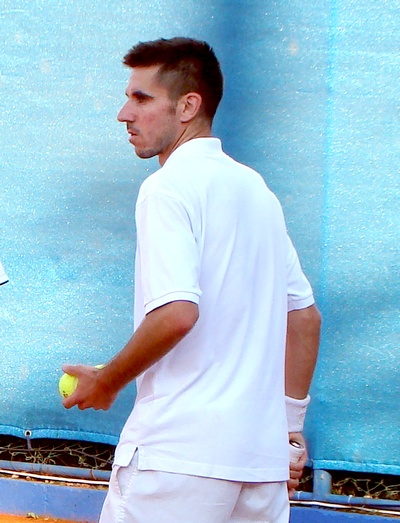
- Karanušić in 2008
- Country (sports): Croatia
- Residence: Zagreb, Croatia
- Born: 5 September 1982 (age 43) Šibenik, SR Croatia, SFR Yugoslavia
- Height: 1.83 m (6 ft 0 in)
- Turned pro: 2000
- Retired: 2012
- Plays: Right-handed (two-handed backhand)
- Coach: Robert Suevic
- Prize money: US$789,254

Singles
- Career record: 13-43 (in ATP Tour and Grand Slam main draws, and in Davis Cup)
- Career titles: 0
- Highest ranking: No. 88 (2 February 2009)

Grand Slam singles results
- Australian Open: 2R (2009)
- French Open: 1R (2006, 2008)
- Wimbledon: 2R (2006, 2008)
- US Open: 2R (2008)

Doubles
- Career record: 1–7 (in ATP Tour and Grand Slam main draws, and in Davis Cup)
- Career titles: 0
- Highest ranking: No. 308 (7 March 2005)

Grand Slam doubles results
- Australian Open: 2R (2005)

Roko Karanušić (born 5 September 1982) is retired Croatian professional tennis player. He turned pro in 2000, and his career-high ATP singles ranking is World No. 88, achieved in February 2009.

== Performance timeline ==
Key
W	F	SF	QF	#R	RR	Q#	P#	DNQ	A	Z#	PO	G	S	B	NMS	NTI	P	NH

(W) winner; (F) finalist; (SF) semifinalist; (QF) quarterfinalist; (#R) rounds 4, 3, 2, 1; (RR) round-robin stage; (Q#) qualification round; (P#) preliminary round; (DNQ) did not qualify; (A) absent; (Z#) Davis/Fed Cup Zonal Group (with number indication) or (PO) play-off; (G) gold, (S) silver or (B) bronze Olympic/Paralympic medal; (NMS) not a Masters tournament; (NTI) not a Tier I tournament; (P) postponed; (NH) not held; (SR) strike rate (events won / competed); (W–L) win–loss record.

=== Singles ===
Tournament	2003	2004	2005	2006	2007	2008	2009	2010	SR	W–L	Win%
Grand Slam tournaments
Australian Open	A	1R	1R	A	A	1R	2R	Q1	0 / 4	1–4	20%
French Open	Q1	Q3	Q1	1R	Q1	1R	Q2	Q1	0 / 2	0–2	0%
Wimbledon	Q3	Q2	1R	2R	Q2	2R	1R	Q3	0 / 4	2–4	33%
US Open	1R	Q1	Q1	A	Q3	2R	Q3	A	0 / 2	1–2	33%
Win–loss	0–1	0–1	0–2	1–2	0–0	2–4	1–2	0–0	0 / 12	4–12	25%
ATP Tour Masters 1000
Indian Wells	A	A	Q1	A	A	A	A	A	0 / 0	0–0	–
Miami	A	Q1	Q2	Q1	A	A	Q2	A	0 / 0	0–0	–
Monte Carlo	A	A	A	A	A	Q1	A	A	0 / 0	0–0	–
Win–loss	0–0	0–0	0–0	0–0	0–0	0–0	0–0	0–0	0 / 0	0–0	–

== ATP Challenger and ITF Futures finals ==
=== Singles: 24 (8–16) ===
Legend ATP Challenger (3–7) ITF Futures (5–9)	Finals by surface Hard (5–8) Clay (2–6) Grass (0–0) Carpet (1–2)

Result	W–L	Date	Tournament	Tier	Surface	Opponent	Score
Loss	0–1	Oct 2000	Italy F12, Selargius	Futures	Hard	(Italy) Filippo Messori	2–6, 2–6
Win	1–1	May 2001	Czech Republic F1, Most	Futures	Clay	(Czech Republic) Radovan Svetlik	6–4, 6–2
Loss	1–2	Jun 2001	Slovenia F3, Kranj	Futures	Clay	(Austria) Herbert Wiltschnig	6–4, 3–6, 2–6
Loss	1–3	Aug 2002	Denmark F2, Rungsted	Futures	Clay	(Australia) Paul Baccanello	0–6, 1–6
Win	2–3	Dec 2002	Spain F21, Pontevedra	Futures	Clay	(France) Jean-Baptiste Perlant	6–3, 6–2
Win	3–3	Dec 2002	Spain F22, Orense	Futures	Hard	(France) Thierry Ascione	walkover
Win	4–3	Jan 2003	Germany F1-B, Biberach	Futures	Hard	(Slovakia) Igor Zelenay	7–5, 7–5
Loss	4–4	Feb 2003	Croatia F1, Zagreb	Futures	Hard	(Czech Republic) Tomáš Cakl	6–7^{(3–7)}, 4–6
Win	5–4	Feb 2003	Croatia F2, Zagreb	Futures	Hard	(Italy) Uros Vico	2–6, 6–3, 6–4
Loss	5–5	Feb 2004	Cherbourg, France	Challenger	Hard	(France) Julien Jeanpierre	1–6, 2–6
Loss	5–6	Jul 2005	Montauban, France	Challenger	Clay	(France) Édouard Roger-Vasselin	4–6, 4–6
Loss	5–7	Jul 2005	Tampere, Finland	Challenger	Clay	(Serbia) Boris Pashanski	6–7^{(5–7)}, 6–4, 5–7
Loss	5–8	Aug 2005	Graz, Austria	Challenger	Hard	(Czech Republic) Robin Vik	4–6, 2–4 ret.
Loss	5–9	Jul 2006	Istanbul, Turkey	Challenger	Hard	(Austria) Alexander Peya	7–6^{(7–3)}, 0–6, 3–6
Win	6–9	Sep 2007	Donetsk, Ukraine	Challenger	Hard	(Belgium) Dick Norman	6–4, 6–4
Loss	6–10	Nov 2007	Eckental, Germany	Challenger	Carpet	(Germany) Denis Gremelmayr	walkover
Win	7–10	Feb 2008	Belgrade, Serbia	Challenger	Carpet	(Germany) Philipp Petzschner	5–7, 6–1, 7–6^{(7–5)}
Win	8–10	Oct 2008	Kolding, Denmark	Challenger	Hard	(Slovakia) Karol Beck	6–4, 6–4
Loss	8–11	Nov 2008	Eckental, Germany	Challenger	Carpet	(Germany) Denis Gremelmayr	2–6, 5–7
Loss	8–12	Nov 2010	Laos F1, Vientiane	Futures	Hard	(Thailand) Kittiphong Wachiramanowong	6–7^{(5–7)}, 6–7^{(6–8)}
Loss	8–13	Nov 2010	Thailand F5, Nonthaburi	Futures	Hard	(Japan) Yūichi Sugita	4–6, 1–6
Loss	8–14	Mar 2011	India F1, Mumbai	Futures	Hard	(India) Yuki Bhambri	6–2, 5–7, 3–6
Loss	8–15	Mar 2011	India F2, Kolkata	Futures	Clay	(Hungary) Ádám Kellner	3–6, 1–6
Loss	8–16	Jun 2011	Serbia F3, Belgrade	Futures	Clay	(Australia) Matt Reid	0–6, 2–6

=== Doubles: 9 (5–4) ===
Legend ATP Challenger (0–2) ITF Futures (5–2)	Finals by surface Hard (5–2) Clay (0–2) Grass (0–0) Carpet (0–0)

Result	W–L	Date	Tournament	Tier	Surface	Partner	Opponents	Score
Loss	0–1	Feb 2000	Croatia F1, Zagreb	Futures	Hard	(Croatia) Zeljko Krajan	(Croatia) Ivica Ančić (Croatia) Mario Ančić	4–6, 7–5, 5–7
Win	1–1	Feb 2001	Croatia F2, Zagreb	Futures	Hard	(Croatia) Lovro Zovko	(Slovakia) Frantisek Babej (Czech Republic) Lukáš Dlouhý	6–4, 6–3
Win	2–1	Feb 2002	Croatia F1, Zagreb	Futures	Hard	(Croatia) Lovro Zovko	(Italy) Daniele Bracciali (Italy) Igor Gaudi	6–4, 5–7, 6–2
Win	3–1	Feb 2002	Croatia F2, Zagreb	Futures	Hard	(Croatia) Lovro Zovko	(Italy) Daniele Bracciali (Italy) Igor Gaudi	6–1, 6–3
Loss	3–2	Aug 2002	Poland F6, Poznań	Futures	Clay	(France) Julien Cassaigne	(Poland) Marcin Golab (Poland) Kamil Lewandowicz	2–6, 6–7^{(5–7)}
Loss	3–3	Nov 2003	Helsinki, Finland	Challenger	Hard	(Serbia) Janko Tipsarević	(Sweden) Robert Lindstedt (Sweden) Robin Söderling	3–6, 7–6^{(7–2)}, 1–6
Loss	3–4	Apr 2006	Chiasso, Switzerland	Challenger	Clay	(Israel) Amir Hadad	(Italy) Leonardo Azzaro (Croatia) Lovro Zovko	2–6, 5–7
Win	4–4	Oct 2010	Kuwait F1, Meshref	Futures	Hard	(Germany) Sebastian Rieschick	(Switzerland) Luca Margaroli (Russia) Mikhail Vasiliev	6–1, 6–4
Win	5–4	Oct 2010	Kuwait F2, Meshref	Futures	Hard	(Germany) Sebastian Rieschick	(Oman) Mohammed Al-Nabhani (United Arab Emirates) Omar Alawadhi	6–2, 6–2
