= K. J. Hippensteel =

American tennis player

- Country (sports): United States
- Residence: Roanoke, Virginia, U.S.
- Born: May 8, 1980 (age 45) Roanoke, Virginia, U.S.
- Height: 6 ft 3 in (1.91 m)
- Turned pro: 2002
- Retired: 2008
- Plays: Left-handed (two-handed backhand)
- College: Stanford University
- Prize money: $134,558

Singles
- Career record: 1–3
- Career titles: 0
- Highest ranking: No. 150 (November 15, 2004)

Grand Slam singles results
- Australian Open: Q3 (2008)
- French Open: Q1 (2008)
- Wimbledon: Q1 (2008)
- US Open: 1R (2004)

Doubles
- Career record: 0–3
- Career titles: 0
- Highest ranking: No. 210 (October 25, 2004)

Grand Slam doubles results
- Wimbledon: 1R (2008)
- US Open: 1R (1998, 1999)
- Last updated on: 16 June 2021.

Kirk James Hippensteel (born May 8, 1980) is an American retired tennis player.

== Career ==
Hippensteel attended Stanford University, where he was a four-time All-American. He was the #1 ranked player in NCAA tennis his sophomore and senior year. Before attending Stanford, Hippensteel was a US Open Boys' Doubles champion with eventual Stanford teammate David Martin in 1998. He also has ITF junior wins over Guillermo Coria and Andy Roddick. He reached a career-high ATP singles ranking of World No. 150 in November 2004, before being slowed by elbow and back injuries.

== Junior Grand Slam finals ==
=== Doubles: 1 (1 title) ===
| Result | Year | Tournament | Surface | Partner | Opponents | Score |
|---|---|---|---|---|---|---|
| Win | 1998 | US Open | Hard | (United States) David Martin | (Israel) Andy Ram (Croatia) Lovro Zovko | 6–7, 7–6, 6–2 |

== ATP Challenger and ITF Futures finals ==
=== Singles: 9 (5–4) ===
| Legend ATP Challenger (1–1) ITF Futures (4–3) | Finals by surface Hard (4–4) Clay (1–0) Grass (0–0) Carpet (0–0) |

| Result | W–L | Date | Tournament | Tier | Surface | Opponent | Score |
|---|---|---|---|---|---|---|---|
| Loss | 0–1 | Jul 2001 | USA F17, Chico | Futures | Hard | (Australia) Jaymon Crabb | 3–6, 6–4, 3–6 |
| Win | 1–1 | Sep 2002 | USA F24B, Costa Mesa | Futures | Hard | (United States) Marc Silva | 6–4, 6–3 |
| Win | 2–1 | Jun 2003 | USA F13, Yuba City | Futures | Hard | (United States) Kean Feeder | 6–3, 7–6^{(7–2)} |
| Win | 3–1 | Aug 2003 | USA F22, Decatur | Futures | Hard | (United Kingdom) Matthew Hanlin | 4–6, 6–1, 6–2 |
| Win | 4–1 | May 2004 | USA F12, Tampa | Futures | Clay | (United States) Brian Baker | 1–6, 7–6^{(7–5)}, 6–2 |
| Loss | 4–2 | Jun 2004 | USA F14, Sunnyvale | Futures | Hard | (Argentina) Alejandro Fabbri | 4–6, 3–6 |
| Loss | 4–3 | Jun 2004 | USA F15, Auburn | Futures | Hard | (United States) Amer Delić | 6–7^{(3–7)}, 3–6 |
| Loss | 4–4 | Aug 2004 | Denver, United States | Challenger | Hard | (United States) Brian Baker | 6–7^{(5–7)}, 4–6 |
| Win | 5–4 | Oct 2004 | Tiburon, United States | Challenger | Hard | (United States) Kevin Kim | 6–3, 6–3 |

=== Doubles: 9 (7–2) ===
| Legend ATP Challenger (1–1) ITF Futures (6–1) | Finals by surface Hard (4–2) Clay (3–0) Grass (0–0) Carpet (0–0) |

| Result | W–L | Date | Tournament | Tier | Surface | Partner | Opponents | Score |
|---|---|---|---|---|---|---|---|---|
| Win | 1–0 | May 2003 | USA F10, Vero Beach | Futures | Clay | (United States) Ryan Haviland | (Brazil) Márcio Carlsson (United States) Rafael De Mesa | 6–2, 6–4 |
| Win | 2–0 | May 2003 | USA F12, Tampa | Futures | Clay | (United States) Ryan Haviland | (United States) Huntley Montgomery (United States) Ryan Sachire | 6–2, 7–6^{(8–6)} |
| Win | 3–0 | Aug 2003 | USA F22, Decatur | Futures | Hard | (United Kingdom) Matthew Hanlin | (United States) David Martin (United States) Scott Lipsky | 6–3, 3–6, 6–4 |
| Loss | 3–1 | Nov 2003 | Waco, United States | Challenger | Hard | (United States) Ryan Haviland | (United States) Devin Bowen (Australia) Ashley Fisher | 4–6, 6–7^{(4–7)} |
| Loss | 3–2 | Feb 2004 | Canada F1, Calgary | Futures | Hard | (United States) Ryan Haviland | (United States) Rajeev Ram (United States) Ryan Sachire | 7–6^{(7–4)}, 6–7^{(7–9)}, 3–6 |
| Win | 4–2 | Feb 2004 | Canada F2, Edmonton | Futures | Hard | (United States) Ryan Haviland | (Netherlands) Paul Logtens (Netherlands) Matwé Middelkoop | 6–3, 4–6, 7–6^{(7–5)} |
| Win | 5–2 | May 2004 | USA F12, Tampa | Futures | Clay | (United States) Ryan Haviland | (United States) Ryan Sachire (United States) Huntley Montgomery | 3–6, 6–4, 6–2 |
| Win | 6–2 | Jun 2004 | USA F14, Sunnyvale | Futures | Hard | (United States) Ryan Haviland | (United States) David Martin (United States) Scott Lipsky | 7–6^{(9–7)}, 6–7^{(1–7)}, 6–3 |
| Win | 7–2 | Sep 2004 | Covington, United States | Challenger | Hard | (United States) Paul Goldstein | (United States) Hugo Armando (Ecuador) Nicolás Lapentti | 6–3, 6–3 |
