= Jean-Christophe Faurel =

French tennis player (born 1981)

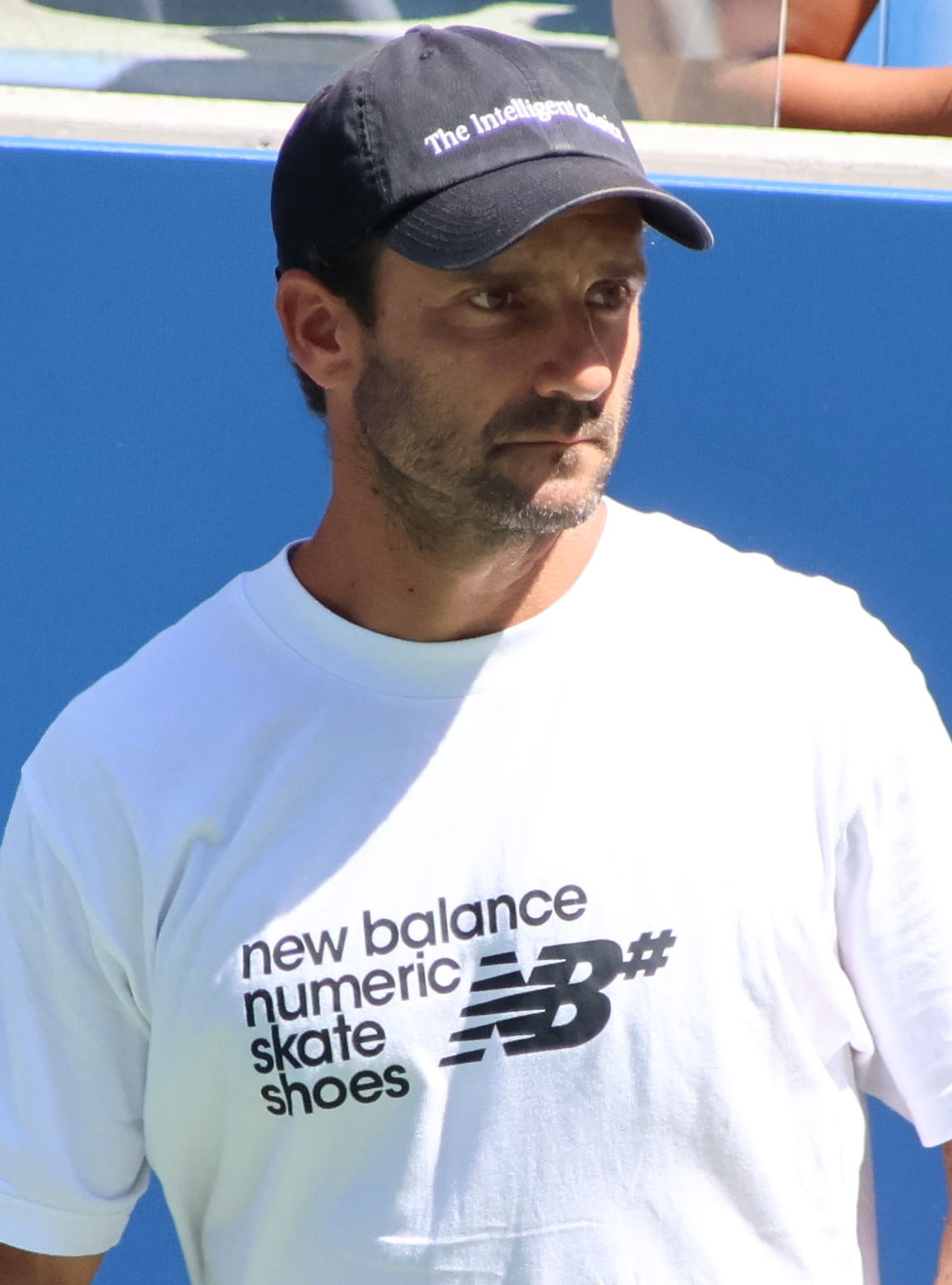
- Faurel in 2026
- Country (sports): France
- Residence: Suresnes, France
- Born: 6 March 1981 (age 45) Rueil-Malmaison, France
- Height: 1.75 m (5 ft 9 in)
- Turned pro: 2000
- Retired: 2009
- Plays: Right-handed
- Prize money: $289,530

Singles
- Career record: 2–7
- Career titles: 0
- Highest ranking: No. 140 (10 April 2006)

Grand Slam singles results
- Australian Open: 2R (2006)
- French Open: 1R (2006)
- Wimbledon: 1R (2006)

Jean-Christophe Faurel (born 6 March 1981) is a French tennis coach and former professional player. He has a career-high singles ranking of world No. 140 achieved on 10 April 2006.

== Tennis career ==
Faurel was a boys' singles quarterfinalist at the 1999 Australian Open.

In 2006, he appeared in three Grand Slam tournaments. At the Australian Open he defeated Alexander Waske and was then beaten in the second round by 20th seed James Blake, over four sets. He exited in the first round of the French Open, at the hands of Olivier Rochus and also failed to make it past the opening round in Wimbledon, losing to Gastón Gaudio.

He had his best win on the ATP Tour at the 2006 Open 13, held in Marseille, where he defeated Feliciano López, the world number 38.

== Coaching career ==
Faurel currently coaches Coco Gauff, alongside Gavin MacMillan. Faurel coached Gauff, initially along with her father, from March 2019 until December 2020, then began coaching Alexandre Müller in July 2021 at Jean-René Lisnard’s Elite Tennis Center, working with Müller through his breakthrough and rise into the top 100 in 2023, before returning to Gauff’s team in April 2024 after she asked him to rejoin alongside Brad Gilbert.

== Challenger titles ==
=== Singles: (1) ===
No.	Year	Tournament	Surface	Opponent	Score
1.	2005	Timișoara, Romania	Clay	(Germany) Jakub Záhlava	6–3, 7–5
