= Stéphane Bohli =

Swiss tennis player (born 1983)

- Country (sports): Switzerland
- Residence: Commugny, Switzerland
- Born: 25 July 1983 (age 42) Geneva, Switzerland
- Height: 1.85 m (6 ft 1 in)
- Turned pro: 2002
- Retired: October 2013 (last match played)
- Plays: Right-handed (two-handed backhand)
- Prize money: $588,725

Singles
- Career record: 6–21
- Career titles: 0
- Highest ranking: No. 113 (18 October 2010)

Grand Slam singles results
- Australian Open: Q3 (2008)
- French Open: Q2 (2011)
- Wimbledon: Q2 (2006, 2008, 2009)
- US Open: 1R (2008)

Doubles
- Career record: 4–6
- Career titles: 0
- Highest ranking: No. 255 (6 August 2007)
- Last updated on: 30 October 2024.

Stéphane Bohli (born 25 July 1983) is a tennis coach and a former professional player from Switzerland. He is currently the coach of Simona Waltert since 2019.

== Junior Grand Slam finals ==
=== Doubles: 1 (1 title) ===
| Result | Year | Tournament | Surface | Partner | Opponents | Score |
|---|---|---|---|---|---|---|
| Win | 2001 | US Open | Hard | (Czech Republic) Tomáš Berdych | (United States) Brendan Evans (United States) Brett Joelson | 6–4, 6–4 |

== ATP career finals ==
=== Doubles: 1 (1 runner-up) ===
| Legend Grand Slam tournaments (0–0) ATP World Tour Finals (0–0) ATP Masters 1000 (0–0) ATP 500 Series (0–0) ATP 250 Series (0–1) | Finals by surface Hard (0–0) Clay (0–1) Grass (0–0) Carpet (0–0) | Finals by setting Outdoor (0–1) Indoor (0–0) |

| Result | W–L | Date | Tournament | Tier | Surface | Partner | Opponents | Score |
|---|---|---|---|---|---|---|---|---|
| Loss | 0–1 | Jul 2008 | Gstaad, Switzerland | International Series | Clay | (Switzerland) Stan Wawrinka | (Czech Republic) Jaroslav Levinský (Slovakia) Filip Polášek | 6–3, 2–6, [9–11] |

== ATP Challenger and ITF Futures finals ==
=== Singles: 19 (10–9) ===
| Legend ATP Challenger (3–7) ITF Futures (7–2) | Finals by surface Hard (7–8) Clay (1–0) Grass (0–0) Carpet (2–1) |

| Result | W–L | Date | Tournament | Tier | Surface | Opponent | Score |
|---|---|---|---|---|---|---|---|
| Win | 1–0 | Nov 2001 | Switzerland F1, Biel | Futures | Hard | (Germany) Philipp Petzschner | 6–2, 6–1 |
| Loss | 1–1 | Mar 2003 | New Zealand F2, Christchurch | Futures | Hard | (Japan) Jun Kato | 3–6, 2–6 |
| Loss | 1–2 | Apr 2003 | Uzbekistan F1, Karshi | Futures | Hard | (France) Rodolphe Cadart | 4–6, 2–6 |
| Win | 2–2 | Apr 2003 | Uzbekistan F2, Guliston | Futures | Hard | (Thailand) Danai Udomchoke | 6–1, 6–1 |
| Win | 3–2 | Nov 2005 | Belgium F2, Waterloo | Futures | Carpet | (Russia) Andrey Golubev | 6–3, 6–4 |
| Win | 4–2 | Apr 2006 | France F7, Angers | Futures | Clay | (Belgium) Steve Darcis | 7–6^{(7–4)}, 6–7^{(4–7)}, 6–3 |
| Loss | 4–3 | Nov 2006 | Louisville, United States | Challenger | Hard | (United States) Amer Delić | 6–3, 2–6, 3–6 |
| Win | 5–3 | Oct 2007 | France F16, Nevers | Futures | Hard | (France) Vincent Millot | 6–2, 6–1 |
| Loss | 5–4 | Oct 2007 | Barnstaple, United Kingdom | Challenger | Hard | (France) Jérémy Chardy | 6–7^{(4–7)}, 7–6^{(7–1)}, 5–7 |
| Loss | 5–5 | Jan 2008 | Nouméa, New Caledonia | Challenger | Hard | (Italy) Flavio Cipolla | 4–6, 5–7 |
| Loss | 5–6 | Feb 2008 | Dallas, United States | Challenger | Hard | (United States) Amer Delić | 4–6, 5–7 |
| Win | 6–6 | May 2008 | Lanzarote, Spain | Challenger | Hard | (Chinese Taipei) Lu Yen-hsun | 6–3, 6–4 |
| Loss | 6–7 | Nov 2008 | Bratislava, Slovakia | Challenger | Hard | (Czech Republic) Jan Hernych | 2–6, 4–6 |
| Win | 7–7 | Jul 2009 | Recanati, Italy | Challenger | Hard | (Kazakhstan) Andrey Golubev | 6–4, 7–6^{(7–4)} |
| Loss | 7–8 | Nov 2009 | Helsinki, Finland | Challenger | Hard | (Poland) Michał Przysiężny | 6–4, 4–6, 1–6 |
| Win | 8–8 | Jul 2010 | Recanati, Italy | Challenger | Hard | (France) Adrian Mannarino | 6–0, 3–6, 7–6^{(7–5)} |
| Loss | 8–9 | Oct 2010 | Rennes, France | Challenger | Carpet | (France) Marc Gicquel | 6–7^{(6–8)}, 6–4, 1–6 |
| Win | 9–9 | Oct 2012 | Turkey F38, Antalya | Futures | Hard | (Australia) Brydan Klein | 7–6^{(7–3)}, 7–6^{(7–4)} |
| Win | 10–9 | Mar 2013 | Switzerland F2, Vaduz | Futures | Carpet | (Italy) Edoardo Eremin | 6–3, 3–6, 7–6^{(7–5)} |

=== Doubles: 11 (7–4) ===
| Legend ATP Challenger (0–3) ITF Futures (7–1) | Finals by surface Hard (6–2) Clay (0–1) Grass (0–1) Carpet (1–0) |

| Result | W–L | Date | Tournament | Tier | Surface | Partner | Opponents | Score |
|---|---|---|---|---|---|---|---|---|
| Win | 1–0 | Nov 2001 | Switzerland F2, Wil | Futures | Carpet | (Germany) Philipp Petzschner | (Czech Republic) Jan Riha (Czech Republic) Pavel Riha | 7–6^{(7–4)}, 3–6, 6–3 |
| Win | 2–0 | Feb 2002 | France F5, Bressuire | Futures | Hard | (France) Benjamin Cassaigne | (Belgium) Philippe Cassiers (Belgium) Jeroen Masson | 7–6^{(7–2)}, 1–6, 6–2 |
| Win | 3–0 | Mar 2003 | New Zealand F1, Blenheim | Futures | Hard | (Japan) Jun Kato | (South Africa) Johan Du Randt (South Africa) Wesley Whitehouse | 7–6^{(8–6)}, 4–6, 6–3 |
| Win | 4–0 | Mar 2003 | New Zealand F2, Christchurch | Futures | Hard | (Japan) Jun Kato | (Australia) Domenic Marafiote (South Africa) Dirk Stegmann | 6–4, 6–3 |
| Loss | 4–1 | May 2003 | Uzbekistan F3, Andijan | Futures | Hard | (Cyprus) Marcos Baghdatis | (South Africa) Justin Bower (Switzerland) Marco Chiudinelli | 3–6, 6–7^{(3–7)} |
| Loss | 4–2 | Jul 2004 | Nottingham, United Kingdom | Challenger | Grass | (Switzerland) Jean-Claude Scherrer | (Australia) Nathan Healey (Finland) Tuomas Ketola | 6–0, 4–6, 2–6 |
| Win | 5–2 | Jan 2005 | Qatar F2, Doha | Futures | Hard | (Switzerland) Michael Lammer | (Slovakia) Jan Stancik (Slovakia) Boris Borgula | 6–7^{(4–7)}, 7–5, 7–6^{(7–3)} |
| Loss | 5–3 | Aug 2005 | Geneva, Switzerland | Challenger | Clsy | (Switzerland) Roman Valent | (Spain) Rubén Ramírez Hidalgo (Spain) Santiago Ventura | 3–6, 5–7 |
| Win | 6–3 | Jan 2006 | Germany F2, Stuttgart | Futures | Hard | (Russia) Artem Sitak | (Germany) Philipp Marx (Germany) Torsten Popp | 6–3, 7–5 |
| Win | 7–3 | Mar 2006 | France F4, Lille | Futures | Hard | (Russia) Artem Sitak | (Portugal) Fred Gil (Poland) Filip Urban | 6–1, 6–2 |
| Loss | 7–4 | Jan 2007 | Durban, South Africa | Challenger | Hard | (Israel) Noam Okun | (South Africa) Rik de Voest (Germany) Dominik Meffert | 4–6, 2–6 |

== Performance timeline ==
Key
| W | F | SF | QF | #R | RR | Q# | DNQ | A | NH |

(W) winner; (F) finalist; (SF) semifinalist; (QF) quarterfinalist; (#R) rounds 4, 3, 2, 1; (RR) round-robin stage; (Q#) qualification round; (DNQ) did not qualify; (A) absent; (NH) not held; (SR) strike rate (events won / competed); (W–L) win–loss record.

=== Singles ===
| Tournament | 2004 | 2005 | 2006 | 2007 | 2008 | 2009 | 2010 | 2011 | 2012 | SR | W–L | Win% |
|---|---|---|---|---|---|---|---|---|---|---|---|---|
Grand Slam tournaments
| Australian Open | Q1 | A | A | Q2 | Q3 | Q1 | A | A | Q2 | 0 / 0 | 0–0 | – |
| French Open | A | A | A | A | Q1 | Q1 | A | Q2 | A | 0 / 0 | 0–0 | – |
| Wimbledon | A | A | Q2 | Q1 | Q2 | Q2 | A | Q1 | A | 0 / 0 | 0–0 | – |
| US Open | A | A | Q2 | A | 1R | Q2 | Q2 | Q1 | A | 0 / 1 | 0–1 | 0% |
| Win–loss | 0–0 | 0–0 | 0–0 | 0–0 | 0–1 | 0–0 | 0–0 | 0–0 | 0–0 | 0 / 1 | 0–1 | 0% |
ATP Tour Masters 1000
| Indian Wells | A | A | A | A | Q2 | Q1 | A | A | Q1 | 0 / 0 | 0–0 | – |
| Miami | A | A | A | A | Q2 | Q1 | Q2 | Q1 | A | 0 / 0 | 0–0 | – |
| Shanghai | Not Held | | | | | A | A | 1R | A | 0 / 1 | 0–1 | 0% |
| Paris | A | A | A | A | A | A | Q2 | A | A | 0 / 0 | 0–0 | – |
| Win–loss | 0–0 | 0–0 | 0–0 | 0–0 | 0–0 | 0–0 | 0–0 | 0–1 | 0–0 | 0 / 1 | 0–1 | 0% |
