= Mathieu Montcourt =

French tennis player (1985–2009)

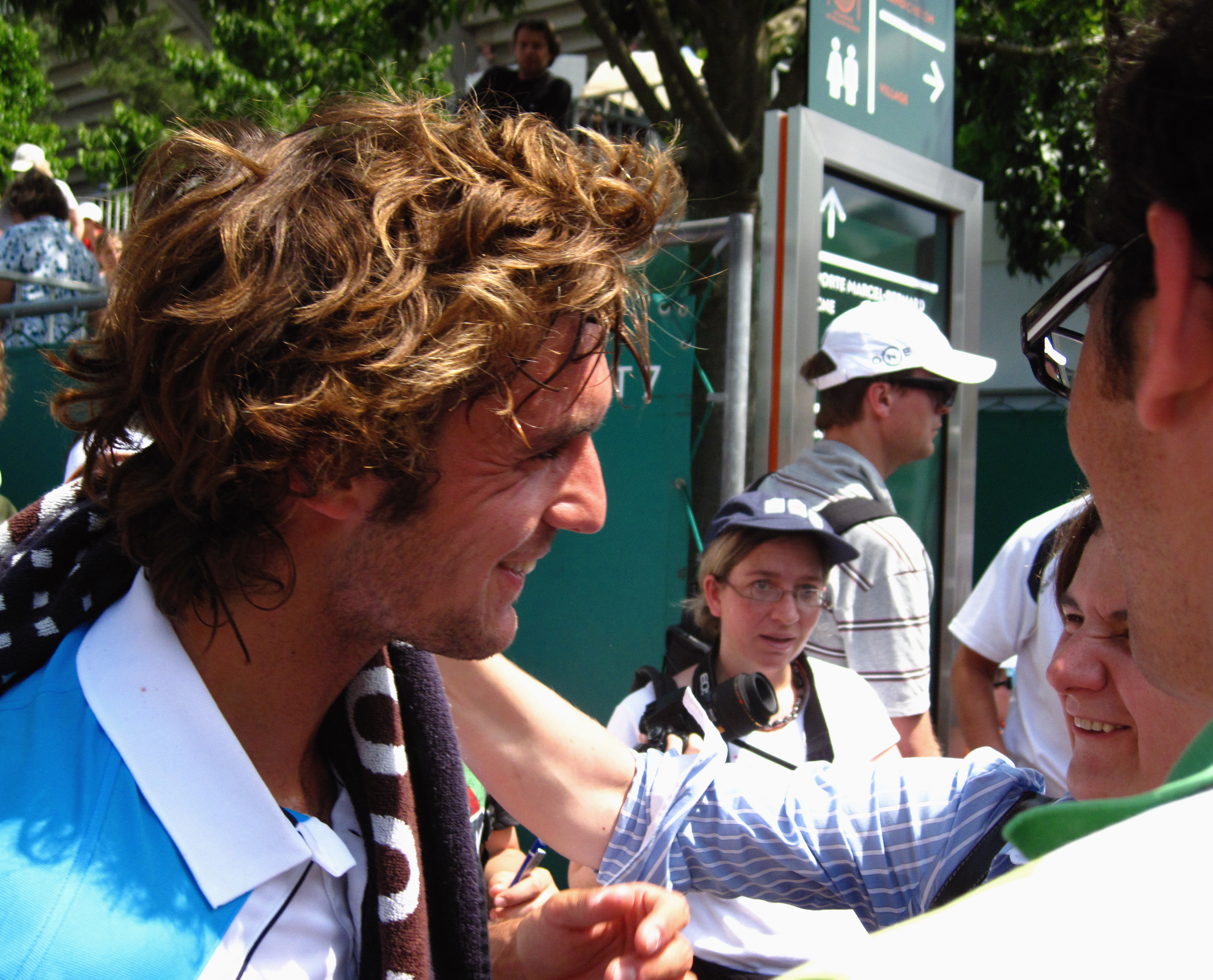
- Country (sports): France
- Residence: Boulogne-Billancourt, France
- Born: 4 March 1985; Paris, France
- Died: 6 July 2009 (aged 24); Boulogne-Billancourt, France
- Height: 1.83 m (6 ft 0 in)
- Turned pro: 2002
- Retired: 2009 (due to death)
- Plays: Right-handed (two-handed backhand)
- Prize money: $327,057

Singles
- Career record: 5–10
- Career titles: 0
- Highest ranking: No. 104 (22 June 2009)

Grand Slam singles results
- Australian Open: 1R (2008)
- French Open: 2R (2006, 2007, 2009)

Doubles
- Career record: 1–2
- Career titles: 0
- Highest ranking: No. 314 (30 July 2007)
- Last updated on: 7 July 2009.

Mathieu Montcourt (French pronunciation: [matjø mɔ̃kuʁ]; 4 March 1985 – 6 July 2009) was a professional French tennis player. At the 2006, 2007, and 2009 French Opens, he lost in the second round, to Lleyton Hewitt, Jarkko Nieminen, and Radek Štěpánek respectively.

== Career ==
In 2002, Mathieu had played a few Futures tournaments and won only one doubles match in Futures aside with Jean Baptiste Robin. His best singles Futures result was making the second round 3 times out of 6, losing to Jan Weinzierl, Nicolas Mahut and Roman Valent, respectively. He didn't play any other events aside from Futures events. Montcourt only played one doubles match in 2003, losing in the first round of a Futures tournament. Montcourt's singles participation in Futures tournaments slightly improved; as for, he went from a 3–6 2002 record to making a semifinal of a Futures event. He still, however, played exclusively in Futures tournaments.

Mathieu Montcourt's success became greater in singles, having had won a Futures title early in 2004 in Italy, beating Andrey Golubev in the final; however the highest person he beat was ranked 407, just inside the top 500. He lost in the finals of one Futures tournament and one Challenger tournament later that year.

In doubles, Mathieu made his first doubles semifinal, where again with Jean Baptiste Robin, he lost in Iran to Benedikt Dorsch and Marko Neunteibl. He lost in the quarterfinals of another tournament in Iran, where he made his Challenger singles final, partnered by Ludwig Pellerin, falling to Juan Ignacio Cerda and Jasper Smit in straight sets. 2005 saw Montcourt make his first Futures doubles final; losing it in March in 3 sets to Lesley Joseph and Evgeny Korolev, alongside Jean Baptiste Robin. However, singles tournaments were brightened by 1 Futures win in two Futures finals, beating Tobias Clemens in the final, and making the semifinals of two Challengers and one Futures tournament, losing once to future top 50 star Philipp Kohlschreiber in a Challenger, the last tournament that Montcourt played that year at Reunion Island (he also lost in the semifinals of Rome).

In 2006, Montcourt won through to back-to-back April semifinal Futures and performances and then went on to play his first major match by receiving a Wildcard into the 2006 French Open. He won, beating Marcos Daniel and then lost to a seeded player the former world number one Lleyton Hewitt, 5–7, 3–6, 3–6. He then went on to make the finals of the Cordenons Futures event. In doubles, he won three 3-set matches to win his first title with Gregory Carraz, beating Tomasz Bednarek and Frank Moser in the final of a Challenger event in Rennes.

In 2007, Mathieu participated in an early-in-the-year Challenger event in singles, winning it over South African Rik de Voest. He beat world number 54 Max Mirnyi in an International Series tournament in Austria. He then lost at Roland Garros to the seeded Jarkko Nieminen in the second round. In addition, Mathieu participated in a doubles Grand Slam event with Gregory Carraz, losing to Łukasz Kubot and Oliver Marach. Since Roland Garros, he has not won any singles match of any type, and has lost in the first round of four Challengers and one International Series tournament. He did, however, win one doubles match at Umag, Croatia (the most recent and International Series tournament that he lost in), beating Marko and Novak Djokovic, but lost in the next round. He was partnered by Édouard Roger-Vasselin.

In 2008, he was fined $12,000 and suspended for eight weeks (later reduced to six) starting on 11 August by the ATP for betting on tennis matches between June and September 2005. He did not bet on his own matches.

== Death ==
On 6 July 2009, Montcourt was found dead outside his home in Boulogne-Billancourt, Paris by his girlfriend. A police source said on 9 July 2009, after a preliminary autopsy, that Mathieu suffered a cardiac arrest. Further tests, that could detect the presence of any drugs or medicines in the body, were carried out. The results of those tests have not been released to the public. On 5 November 2009, Court No. 3 of the Centre National d'Entraînement at Stade Roland Garros was renamed le Court Mathieu Montcourt, in honor of the player who trained there regularly.

== Titles ==
=== Singles ===
Legend (singles)
Grand Slam (0)
Tennis Masters Cup (0)
ATP Masters Series (0)
ATP Tour (0)
Challengers (3)
Futures (3)

No.	Date	Tournament	Surface	Opponent in the Final	Score in the Final
1.	9 August 2004	L'Aquila, Italy	Clay	(Kazakhstan) Andrey Golubev	6–2, 6–1
2.	24 October 2005	Rodez, France	Hard	(Germany) Tobias Clemens	6–3, 6–2
3.	January 2007	Durban, South Africa	Hard	(South Africa) Rik de Voest	5–7, 6–3, 6–2
4.	7 April 2008	Bergamo Italy	Clay	(Croatia) Antonio Veić	6–2, 7–5
5.	23 June 2008	Reggio Emilia, Italy	Clay	(Spain) Pablo Andújar	2–6, 6–2, 6–4
6.	28 July 2008	Tampere, Finland	Clay	(Italy) Flavio Cipolla	6–2, 6–2
