= Sébastien de Chaunac =

French tennis player

- Country (sports): France
- Residence: Annecy, France
- Born: 7 October 1977 (age 47); Nevers, France
- Height: 1.82 m (6 ft 0 in)
- Turned pro: 1998
- Retired: 2010
- Plays: Right-handed (two-handed backhand)
- Coach: Pier Gauthier
- Prize money: $547,906

Singles
- Career record: 10–22 (at ATP Tour level, Grand Slam level, and in Davis Cup)
- Career titles: 0
- Highest ranking: No. 130 (16 November 2009)
- Current ranking: No. 950 (23 May 2011)

Grand Slam singles results
- Australian Open: 2R (2009)
- French Open: 2R (2002)
- Wimbledon: Q3 (2009)
- US Open: 1R (2001)

Doubles
- Career record: 2–13 (at ATP Tour level, Grand Slam level, and in Davis Cup)
- Career titles: 0
- Highest ranking: No. 265 (5 April 2004)

Grand Slam doubles results
- French Open: 1R (1999, 2003, 2004, 2009)

Sébastien de Chaunac (French pronunciation: [sebastjɛ̃ dəʃonak]; born 7 October 1977) is a retired French professional tennis player. He mainly played ATP Challenger Series tournaments, capturing one singles and two doubles titles. He has appeared in the main draw of grand slam tournaments a total of eight times.

== Career ==
=== College career ===
Prior to turning pro, de Chaunac played three collegiate seasons (1995–98) at the University of Mississippi and was tabbed an All-American in his final two years. As a sophomore in 1996–97, he was 52–9 in singles, reached the semifinals of the 1997 NCAA Singles Championship and finished the season ranked No. 2 nationally. He also was the Southeastern Conference Tournament MVP and led the Rebels to the semifinals of the NCAA Team Championship (after Ole Miss had reached the quarterfinals in both 1996 and '97), clinching the quarterfinal victory against Boise State. As a junior in 1997–98, de Chaunac was ranked No. 1 in the nation in singles and claimed the title in the SEC Singles Championship. An all-SEC selection in his final two seasons, he helped the Rebels claim SEC regular-season titles in both 1996 and '97, as well as the tournament crown in the latter year. An outstanding student, de Chaunac was named to the GTE/CoSIDA Academic All-America First Team in 1998 and had a perfect 4.0 grade-point average.

=== 2009 ===
He entered the qualifications of the 2009 Australian Open ranked #252. He beat Gary Lugassy (6–4, 6–3), Alex Bogdanović (6–3, 6–2) and Santiago Ventura (6–4, 6–1) to qualify for the main draw of the Australian Open for the second time in his career after a first round appearance in 2004. In the first round proper, he defeated #57 Steve Darcis in a gruelling 5-set encounter, finally prevailing 2–6, 6–3, 0–6, 6–2, 6–2. He was then beaten in straight sets by ninth seed and World No. 10 James Blake 6–3, 6–2, 6–3.

He then qualified for the SA Tennis Open in Johannesburg. In the first round, he upset third seed Marcel Granollers 7–5, 7–6^{(3)} then defeated local wildcard Izak van der Merwe in a hard-fought 6–7^{(3)}, 7–5, 7–6^{(5)} victory to reach the quarter-finals of an ATP tournament for the first time since February 2005 in Marseille. There he was beaten by fellow Frenchman and eventual runner-up Jérémy Chardy 7–6^{(4)}, 6–3.

This loss marked the beginning of a period of struggle for de Chaunac, as he successively failed to qualify for the tournaments in Marseille and Indian Wells, while also recording a string of first and second-round defeats in Challenger tournaments. This period was highlighted only by a semifinal run at the Jersey Challenger in March and a final at a Futures tournament in Newcastle upon Tyne in May. The following week, he entered the qualifying draw for the French Open, discarding Grega Žemlja (3–6, 7–5, 7–5) and Pablo Santos (6–7^{(1)}, 6–2, 6–2), only to fall to Daniel Brands 7–6^{(5)}, 6–7^{(3)}, 10–8 in the qualifying round. He was equally unlucky at Wimbledon, losing to Alejandro Falla 6–4, 6–4, 6–4 in the last round of qualifying.

He bounced back, though, by qualifying for the next tournament in Indianapolis, where he put up a good but ultimately unsuccessful fight in the first round against Robby Ginepri, who prevailed 7–5, 5–7, 6–2, and went on to win the tournament. Two weeks later, he qualified for an ATP World Tour 500 tournament in Washington by defeating Brendan Evans 4–6, 7–6^{(3)}, 7–6^{(4)}. He beat Denis Istomin 6–4, 7–6^{(7)} in the first round, before stunning fourteenth seed and World No. 32 Dmitry Tursunov 3–6, 7–6^{(3)}, 7–5, the highest-ranked player he ever managed to beat. Unfortunately, his run was cut short by American John Isner, who ousted him 6–2, 6–4 in the next round. As a result, he reached a new career-high, integrating the Top 150 for the first time. However, he failed to qualify for the US Open, losing to Marsel İlhan 7–6^{(4)}, 7–6^{(6)} in the second round of qualifying.

A few weeks later, he qualified for yet another ATP-level tournament, his fifth of the year, in Metz, by beating Alex Bogdanović 6–1, 1–6, 7–6^{(7)}. In the first round, he pushed Ivan Ljubičić to a final-set tie-break, losing 4–6, 6–1, 7–6^{(1)}. His efforts were rewarded by a new career-high ranking of World No. 140.

== Personal life ==
He is the son of former racing car driver and founder of Oreca Team Hugues de Chaunac. He allegedly is married and has three children.

== Singles finals ==
=== Wins (5) ===
Legend (singles)
Grand Slam (0)
Tennis Masters Cup (0)
ATP Masters Series (0)
ATP Tour (0)
Challengers (1)
Futures (4)

No.	Date	Tournament	Surface	Opponent in the final	Score
1.	5 May 1999	Esslingen am Neckar, Germany	Clay	(Austria) Martin Spöttl	7–6, 6–2
2.	10 July 2000	Bourg-en-Bresse, France	Clay	(Portugal) Emanuel Couto	7–5, 6–2
3.	17 July 2000	Aix-en-Provence, France	Clay	(Algeria) Slimane Saoudi	7–6^{(7–4)}, 6–3
4.	8 May 2001	Newcastle upon Tyne, United Kingdom	Clay	(Finland) Jarkko Nieminen	6–4, 6–2
5.	2 February 2004	Dallas, United States	Hard	(United States) Amer Delic	6–4, 7–6^{(7–3)}

=== Runners-up (9) ===
No.	Date	Tournament	Surface	Opponent in the final	Score
1.	28 April 1999	Hatfield, United Kingdom	Clay	(France) Jean-René Lisnard	7–6, 1–6, 6–0
2.	16 August 1999	Bronx, U.S.	Hard	(Germany) Alexander Popp	6–7^{(4–7)}, 7–6^{(7–4)}, 6–0
3.	15 October 2001	Brasília, Brazil	Clay	(Argentina) Sebastián Prieto	6–4, 4–6, 7–6^{6}
4.	22 September 2003	San Antonio, United States	Hard	(Russia) Dmitry Tursunov	6–2, 6–7^{(3–7)}, 6–4
5.	29 September 2003	Nevers, France	Hard	(France) Jean-Michel Pequery	6–4, 6–4
6.	13 March 2006	Lille, France	Hard	(France) Jo-Wilfried Tsonga	7–5, 7–5
7.	7 January 2008	Nußloch, Germany	Carpet	(Slovakia) Karol Beck	6–4, 6–4
8.	7 April 2008	Angers, France	Clay	(France) Alexandre Sidorenko	6–7^{(7–9)}, 6–2, 7–6^{(7–5)}
9.	11 May 2009	Newcastle upon Tyne, United Kingdom	Clay	(France) David Guez	6–3, 3–6, 6–0

== Doubles titles ==
=== Wins (3) ===
Legend (singles)
Grand Slam (0)
Tennis Masters Cup (0)
ATP Masters Series (0)
ATP Tour (0)
Challengers (2)
Futures (1)

No.	Date	Tournament	Surface	Partner	Opponents in the final	Score
1.	10 April 2000	Saint-Brieuc, France	Clay	(France) Olivier Patience	(France) Maxime Boyé (France) Jérôme Hanquez	w/o
2.	15 September 2003	Mandeville, United States	Hard	(United States) Zack Fleishman	(Germany) Benedikt Dorsch (Slovenia) Matija Zgaga	6–7^{(3–7)}, 7–6^{(7–2)}, 6–3
3.	24 January 2005	Heilbronn, Germany	Carpet	(Slovakia) Michal Mertiňák	(Belgium) Gilles Elseneer (Luxembourg) Gilles Müller	6–2, 3–6, 6–3

=== Runners-up (1) ===
No.	Date	Tournament	Surface	Partner	Opponents in the final	Score
1.	28 May 1999	Hatfield, United Kingdom	Clay	(France) Olivier Mutis	(United Kingdom) Simon Dickson (United Kingdom) Danny Sapsford	7–5, 6–0
