= Scoville Jenkins =

American tennis player

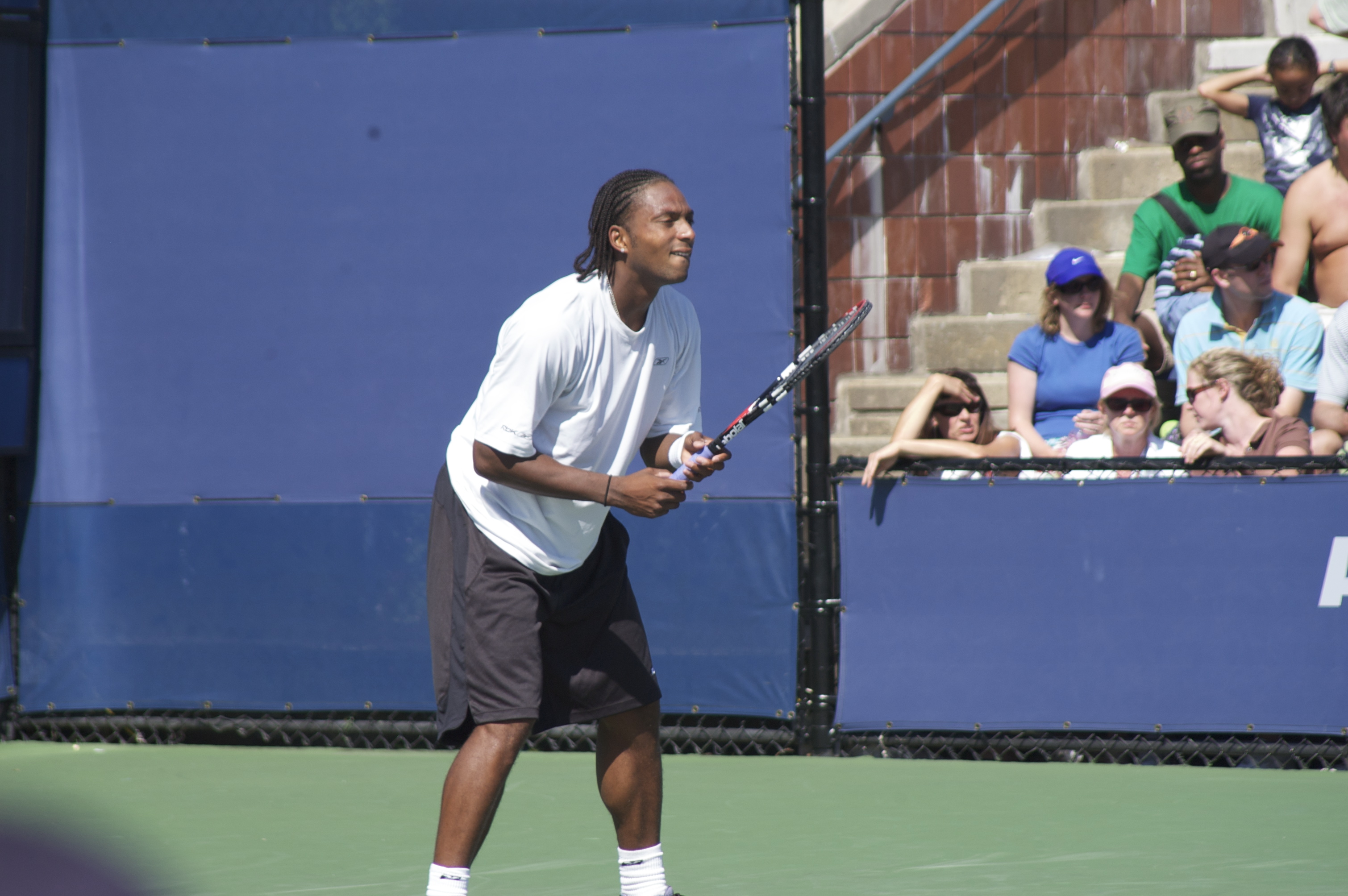
- Country (sports): United States
- Residence: Atlanta, Georgia
- Born: September 23, 1986 (age 39) Atlanta, Georgia
- Height: 6 ft 2 in (1.88 m)
- Turned pro: 1999
- Retired: 2010
- Plays: Right-handed (two-handed backhand)
- Prize money: $353,515

Singles
- Career record: 6–15
- Career titles: 0
- Highest ranking: No. 187 (April 13, 2009)

Grand Slam singles results
- French Open: 1R (2008)
- US Open: 2R (2005)

Doubles
- Career record: 2–6
- Career titles: 0
- Highest ranking: No. 198 (July 10, 2006)

Scoville Jenkins (born September 23, 1986, in Atlanta, Georgia) is a former professional tennis player on the ATP Tour. He is sometimes referred to by his nickname "Sco". He reached a career-high ATP singles ranking of World No. 187 in April 2009.

== Junior career ==
On August 16, 2004, at the age of 17, Jenkins became the first African-American to capture the Boys' 18 USTA National Hard Court title in singles in the tournament's 89-year history.

In 2004, Jenkins reached the semi-finals of Junior Wimbledon, quarter-finals of Junior US Open, junior Australian Open, and ranked 6 in the ITF junior rankings.

== Professional career ==
At the 2005 U.S. Open, Jenkins won a dramatic first round match in five sets against Swiss veteran George Bastl. In his second round match, Jenkins played then world no. 2 Rafael Nadal, who won in three close sets.

In June 2006, Jenkins nearly qualified for his first appearance at Wimbledon, but was narrowly defeated in the 3rd qualifying round by Joshua Goodall in a four-set match that featured three tie breakers.

In the 2007 US Open, Jenkins drew Roger Federer in the first round, losing in straight sets.

In 2008, Jenkins qualified for the French Open for the first time, but lost to Luis Horna, a lucky loser from the same qualifying draw in the first round in four sets.

== 2009 ==
Jenkins lost to Kevin Kim in the 2009 BNP Paribas Open. Scoville came through qualifying at the U.S. Men's Clay Court Championship, where he beat Donald Young in the final round. He then routed Alexander Peya to reach the second round. He then fell to semifinalist Björn Phau in straight sets. At the French Open, Scoville was defeated in the first round of qualifying by Sergei Bubka 7–6^{(5)}, 4–6, 6–4.

In August 2010, Jenkins retired from professional tennis and joined the staff at Kennesaw State University as a men's assistant coach.

In June 2014, Jenkins graduated from the University of Washington

Jenkins is currently assistant coach at Oklahoma State University.
