= 2007 Wimbledon Championships – Women's singles qualifying =

Women's singles qualifying
- 2007 Wimbledon Championships

Events
Singles	men	women		boys	girls
Doubles	men	women	mixed	boys	girls
WC Singles	men	women	quad
WC Doubles	men	women	quad
Legends	men	women	seniors

Qualification
Singles	men	women
Doubles	men	women
- Wimbledon Championships

Players and pairs who neither have high enough rankings nor receive wild cards may participate in a qualifying tournament held one week before the annual Wimbledon Tennis Championships.

== Seeds ==
1. (Hungary) Ágnes Szávay (qualified)
2. (Slovakia) Dominika Cibulková (first round)
3. (Ukraine) Olga Savchuk (second round)
4. (France) Stéphanie Cohen-Aloro (second round)
5. (Czech Republic) Klára Zakopalová (qualifying competition)
6. (Germany) Andrea Petkovic (first round)
7. (Russia) Galina Voskoboeva (first round)
8. (France) Mathilde Johansson (qualifying competition)
9. (Sweden) Sofia Arvidsson (second round)
10. (France) Youlia Fedossova (first round)
11. (United States) Ahsha Rolle (qualifying competition)
12. (United States) Lilia Osterloh (second round)
13. (Australia) Casey Dellacqua (qualified)
14. (Chinese Taipei) Hsieh Su-wei (qualified)
15. (Czech Republic) Renata Voráčová (second round)
16. (Ukraine) Yuliana Fedak (first round)
17. (Germany) Kristina Barrois (first round)
18. (Hungary) Kira Nagy (second round)
19. (Spain) Laura Pous Tió (first round)
20. (Ukraine) Yuliya Beygelzimer (first round)
21. (United States) Abigail Spears (second round)
22. (Canada) Stéphanie Dubois (first round)
23. (France) Alizé Cornet (qualifying competition, lucky loser)
24. (Uzbekistan) Akgul Amanmuradova (qualifying competition)

== Qualifiers ==
1. (Hungary) Ágnes Szávay
2. (Puerto Rico) Kristina Brandi
3. (Australia) Casey Dellacqua
4. (Croatia) Nika Ožegović
5. (Argentina) Jorgelina Cravero
6. (Japan) Ayumi Morita
7. (Belarus) Olga Govortsova
8. (Chinese Taipei) Hsieh Su-wei
9. (Ukraine) Tatiana Perebiynis
10. (Czech Republic) Hana Šromová
11. (China) Yan Zi
12. (Czech Republic) Barbora Záhlavová-Strýcová

== Lucky loser ==
1. (France) Alizé Cornet

== Qualifying draw ==
=== First qualifier ===
First round
1	(Hungary) Ágnes Szávay	7	6
(New Zealand) Marina Erakovic	5	3
WC	(United Kingdom) Sarah Borwell	7^{7}	6
(Canada) Marie-Ève Pelletier	6^{1}	0
(Netherlands) Elise Tamaëla	2	1
(Romania) Sorana Cîrstea	6	6
(Japan) Shiho Hisamatsu	5	3
24	(Uzbekistan) Akgul Amanmuradova	7	6

Second round
1	(Hungary) Ágnes Szávay	6	6
WC	(United Kingdom) Sarah Borwell	4	4
(Romania) Sorana Cîrstea	6	3	2
24	(Uzbekistan) Akgul Amanmuradova	1	6	6

Qualifying competition
1	(Hungary) Ágnes Szávay	6	6
24	(Uzbekistan) Akgul Amanmuradova	1	3

=== Second qualifier ===
First round
2	(Slovakia) Dominika Cibulková	6^{8}	6	8
(Romania) Anda Perianu	7^{10}	1	10
(Paraguay) Rossana de los Ríos	6	6
(Belarus) Darya Kustova	2	4
(Puerto Rico) Kristina Brandi	7	6
(China) Yuan Meng	5	1
(Croatia) Ivana Lisjak	6^{4}	2
21	(United States) Abigail Spears	7^{7}	6

Second round
(Romania) Anda Perianu	7^{7}	2	7
(Paraguay) Rossana de los Ríos	6^{3}	6	5
(Puerto Rico) Kristina Brandi	6	6
21	(United States) Abigail Spears	4	3

Qualifying competition
(Romania) Anda Perianu	1	3
(Puerto Rico) Kristina Brandi	6	6

=== Third qualifier ===
First round
3	(Ukraine) Olga Savchuk	6	2	6
WC	(United Kingdom) Julia Bone	3	6	1
(Czech Republic) Petra Cetkovská	6	6
(Chinese Taipei) Chan Chin-wei	1	1
(Brazil) Jenifer Widjaja	6	6
WC	(United Kingdom) Emily Webley-Smith	2	3
WC	(United Kingdom) Rebecca Llewellyn	1	2
13	(Australia) Casey Dellacqua	6	6

Second round
3	(Ukraine) Olga Savchuk	2	6	1
(Czech Republic) Petra Cetkovská	6	3	6
(Brazil) Jenifer Widjaja	1	6	1
13	(Australia) Casey Dellacqua	6	4	6

Qualifying competition
(Czech Republic) Petra Cetkovská	3	6	3
13	(Australia) Casey Dellacqua	6	3	6

=== Fourth qualifier ===
First round
4	(France) Stéphanie Cohen-Aloro	6	6^{2}	6
(Belarus) Iryna Kuryanovich	1	7^{7}	1
(Belgium) Caroline Maes	0	3
(Croatia) Nika Ožegović	6	6
(Spain) María José Martínez Sánchez	3	3
(Slovenia) Andreja Klepač	6	6
(Netherlands) Brenda Schultz-McCarthy	6	2	4
15	(Czech Republic) Renata Voráčová	3	6	6

Second round
4	(France) Stéphanie Cohen-Aloro	1	6	6
(Croatia) Nika Ožegović	6	1	8
(Slovenia) Andreja Klepač	6	6
15	(Czech Republic) Renata Voráčová	1	1

Qualifying competition
(Croatia) Nika Ožegović	6	4	6
(Slovenia) Andreja Klepač	3	6	4

=== Fifth qualifier ===
First round
5	(Czech Republic) Klára Zakopalová	7^{7}	6
(Croatia) Ana Vrljić	6^{4}	4
(South Africa) Natalie Grandin	6	6
WC	(United Kingdom) Karen Paterson	4	3
(Japan) Seiko Okamoto	6^{3}	6	6
(Argentina) Jorgelina Cravero	7^{7}	4	8
(Romania) Mădălina Gojnea	3	7^{7}	6
20	(Ukraine) Yuliya Beygelzimer	6	6^{5}	4

Second round
5	(Czech Republic) Klára Zakopalová	6	6
(South Africa) Natalie Grandin	1	4
(Argentina) Jorgelina Cravero	6	6
(Romania) Mădălina Gojnea	1	2

Qualifying competition
5	(Czech Republic) Klára Zakopalová	7	5	5
(Argentina) Jorgelina Cravero	5	7	7

=== Sixth qualifier ===
First round
6	(Germany) Andrea Petkovic	4	4
(Japan) Erika Takao	6	6
(Japan) Ayumi Morita	6	4	6
(United States) Raquel Kops-Jones	0	6	3
(Georgia (country)) Margalita Chakhnashvili	3	3
(Argentina) Paola Suárez	6	6
(Italy) Giulia Gabba	6	6
22	(Canada) Stéphanie Dubois	4	3

Second round
(Japan) Erika Takao	1	7^{7}	1
(Japan) Ayumi Morita	6	6^{3}	6
(Argentina) Paola Suárez	6	2
(Italy) Giulia Gabba	0	0^{r}

Qualifying competition
(Japan) Ayumi Morita	7	7
(Argentina) Paola Suárez	5	5

=== Seventh qualifier ===
First round
7	(Russia) Galina Voskoboeva	3	5
(Russia) Evgeniya Rodina	6	7
(Belarus) Olga Govortsova	6	6
(Czech Republic) Sandra Záhlavová	3	3
WC	(Slovakia) Magdaléna Rybáriková	5	1
(Romania) Monica Niculescu	7	6
(Finland) Emma Laine	3	5
23	(France) Alizé Cornet	6	7

Second round
(Russia) Evgeniya Rodina	1	2
(Belarus) Olga Govortsova	6	6
(Romania) Monica Niculescu	6	4	2
23	(France) Alizé Cornet	3	6	6

Qualifying competition
(Belarus) Olga Govortsova	7^{14}	3	6
23	(France) Alizé Cornet	6^{12}	6	4

=== Eighth qualifier ===
First round
8	(France) Mathilde Johansson	6	6^{3}	6
(United States) Julie Ditty	2	7^{7}	2
(Japan) Junri Namigata	5	0
WC	(United Kingdom) Anna Fitzpatrick	7	6
(Belarus) Ekaterina Dzehalevich	6	7^{7}
(Germany) Kathrin Wörle	4	6^{5}
(Tunisia) Selima Sfar	6	6^{6}	1
14	(Chinese Taipei) Hsieh Su-wei	4	7^{8}	6

Second round
8	(France) Mathilde Johansson	6	6
WC	(United Kingdom) Anna Fitzpatrick	1	2
(Belarus) Ekaterina Dzehalevich	5	3
14	(Chinese Taipei) Hsieh Su-wei	7	6

Qualifying competition
8	(France) Mathilde Johansson	2	6	2
14	(Chinese Taipei) Hsieh Su-wei	6	1	6

=== Ninth qualifier ===
First round
9	(Sweden) Sofia Arvidsson	7	6
(Poland) Joanna Sakowicz	5	2
(France) Stéphanie Foretz	6^{4}	6	6
(Argentina) María José Argeri	7^{7}	2	2
WC	(Ukraine) Tatiana Perebiynis	4	6	6
(Czech Republic) Andrea Hlaváčková	6	4	1
(Argentina) María Emilia Salerni	7	6
17	(Germany) Kristina Barrois	5	2

Second round
9	(Sweden) Sofia Arvidsson	6^{2}	4
(France) Stéphanie Foretz	7^{7}	6
WC	(Ukraine) Tatiana Perebiynis	6	4	6
(Argentina) María Emilia Salerni	4	6	3

Qualifying competition
(France) Stéphanie Foretz	2	4
WC	(Ukraine) Tatiana Perebiynis	6	6

=== Tenth qualifier ===
First round
10	(France) Youlia Fedossova	6^{6}	3
(Uzbekistan) Iroda Tulyaganova	7^{8}	6
(Republic of Ireland) Kelly Liggan	4	6	1
(Czech Republic) Hana Šromová	6	4	6
(Russia) Alina Jidkova	6	6^{6}	14
(Argentina) Betina Jozami	2	7^{8}	12
(Australia) Monique Adamczak	6	5	6
19	(Spain) Laura Pous Tió	2	7	2

Second round
(Uzbekistan) Iroda Tulyaganova	4	2
(Czech Republic) Hana Šromová	6	6
(Russia) Alina Jidkova	7^{7}	7^{7}
(Australia) Monique Adamczak	6^{2}	6^{5}

Qualifying competition
(Czech Republic) Hana Šromová	6	6
(Russia) Alina Jidkova	4	4

=== Eleventh qualifier ===
First round
11	(United States) Ahsha Rolle	6	6
(Germany) Angelika Bachmann	2	1
(Russia) Lioudmila Skavronskaia	3	6	6
(Israel) Yevgenia Savransky	6	3	4
(Slovenia) Maša Zec Peškirič	6	6
(Croatia) Ivana Abramović	1	2
(China) Yan Zi	3	6	6
16	(Ukraine) Yuliana Fedak	6	4	2

Second round
11	(United States) Ahsha Rolle	7^{7}	6
(Russia) Lioudmila Skavronskaia	6^{4}	2
(Slovenia) Maša Zec Peškirič	2	0
(China) Yan Zi	6	6

Qualifying competition
11	(United States) Ahsha Rolle	6^{7}	1
(China) Yan Zi	7^{9}	6

=== Twelfth qualifier ===
First round
12	(United States) Lilia Osterloh	7	6
(Estonia) Maret Ani	5	3
(Germany) Vanessa Henke	1	1
(Russia) Ekaterina Makarova	6	6
(Russia) Ekaterina Ivanova	2	2
(Czech Republic) Barbora Záhlavová-Strýcová	6	6
(Germany) Sabine Klaschka	7^{7}	6^{2}	0
18	(Hungary) Kira Nagy	6^{2}	7^{7}	6

Second round
12	(United States) Lilia Osterloh	6^{1}	6^{6}
(Russia) Ekaterina Makarova	7^{7}	7^{8}
(Czech Republic) Barbora Záhlavová-Strýcová	7^{8}	6
18	(Hungary) Kira Nagy	6^{6}	4

Qualifying competition
(Russia) Ekaterina Makarova	6	6^{4}	3
(Czech Republic) Barbora Záhlavová-Strýcová	2	7^{7}	6
