= 2007 Wimbledon Championships – Men's singles qualifying =

Men's singles qualifying
- 2007 Wimbledon Championships

Events
Singles	men	women		boys	girls
Doubles	men	women	mixed	boys	girls
WC Singles	men	women	quad
WC Doubles	men	women	quad
Legends	men	women	seniors

Qualification
Singles	men	women
Doubles	men	women
- Wimbledon Championships

Players and pairs who neither have high enough rankings nor receive wild cards may participate in a qualifying tournament held one week before the annual Wimbledon Tennis Championships.

== Seeds ==
1. (France) Olivier Patience (second round)
2. (France) Nicolas Mahut (qualified)
3. (France) Édouard Roger-Vasselin (qualified)
4. (Canada) Frank Dancevic (qualifying competition, lucky loser)
5. (Italy) Daniele Bracciali (qualifying competition)
6. (Colombia) Santiago Giraldo (second round)
7. (United States) Kevin Kim (qualifying competition, lucky loser)
8. (Italy) Federico Luzzi (qualifying competition)
9. (Greece) Konstantinos Economidis (first round)
10. (Colombia) Alejandro Falla (qualified)
11. (Chile) Paul Capdeville (qualifying competition)
12. (South Africa) Rik de Voest (qualified)
13. (Chile) Adrián García (withdrew)
14. (Germany) Mischa Zverev (qualified)
15. (Spain) Fernando Vicente (qualified)
16. (Czech Republic) Tomáš Zíb (qualified)
17. (Brazil) Thiago Alves (first round)
18. (United States) Bobby Reynolds (qualified)
19. (South Africa) Wesley Moodie (second round)
20. (Italy) Stefano Galvani (qualifying competition)
21. (Serbia) Ilija Bozoljac (first round)
22. (Czech Republic) Bohdan Ulihrach (qualified)
23. (France) Thierry Ascione (second round)
24. (Croatia) Roko Karanušić (second round)
25. (Paraguay) Ramón Delgado (first round)
26. (Chinese Taipei) Wang Yeu-tzuoo (qualified)
27. (Luxembourg) Gilles Müller (qualified)
28. (Spain) Pablo Andújar (second round, withdrew)
29. (Poland) Łukasz Kubot (first round)
30. (Slovakia) Lukáš Lacko (first round)
31. (Brazil) Ricardo Mello (second round)
32. (Belgium) Dick Norman (second round)

== Qualifiers ==
1. (Chinese Taipei) Wang Yeu-tzuoo
2. (France) Nicolas Mahut
3. (France) Édouard Roger-Vasselin
4. (Pakistan) Aisam-ul-Haq Qureshi
5. (United States) Bobby Reynolds
6. (Czech Republic) Bohdan Ulihrach
7. (United States) Sam Warburg
8. (United States) Zack Fleishman
9. (United Kingdom) Lee Childs
10. (Colombia) Alejandro Falla
11. (Luxembourg) Gilles Müller
12. (South Africa) Rik de Voest
13. (Australia) Wayne Arthurs
14. (Germany) Mischa Zverev
15. (Spain) Fernando Vicente
16. (Czech Republic) Tomáš Zíb

== Lucky loser ==
1. (Canada) Frank Dancevic
2. (United States) Kevin Kim

== Qualifying draw ==
=== First qualifier ===
First round
1	(France) Olivier Patience	6	6
(Australia) Robert Smeets	4	4
PR	(Italy) Giorgio Galimberti	4	6	5
(Russia) Andrey Golubev	6	1	7
(Italy) Simone Vagnozzi	6^{11}	1
(Brazil) Rogério Dutra Silva	7^{13}	6
(Ukraine) Sergiy Stakhovsky	5	2
26	(Chinese Taipei) Wang Yeu-tzuoo	7	6

Second round
1	(France) Olivier Patience	3	3
(Russia) Andrey Golubev	6	6
(Brazil) Rogério Dutra Silva	6^{5}	5
26	(Chinese Taipei) Wang Yeu-tzuoo	7^{7}	7

Qualifying competition
(Russia) Andrey Golubev	6^{4}	6^{5}	1
26	(Chinese Taipei) Wang Yeu-tzuoo	7^{7}	7^{7}	6

=== Second qualifier ===
First round
2	(France) Nicolas Mahut	7	6
(Israel) Noam Okun	5	3
(United States) Phillip Simmonds	4	2
(Australia) Joseph Sirianni	6	6
(Japan) Gouichi Motomura	2	4
(Germany) Simon Stadler	6	6
(India) Rohan Bopanna	6	1	17
19	(South Africa) Wesley Moodie	3	6	19

Second round
2	(France) Nicolas Mahut	6	6
(Australia) Joseph Sirianni	4	4
(Germany) Simon Stadler	6	6^{1}	6
19	(South Africa) Wesley Moodie	4	7^{7}	4

Qualifying competition
2	(France) Nicolas Mahut	6	7^{7}	6
(Germany) Simon Stadler	3	6^{4}	1

=== Third qualifier ===
First round
3	(France) Édouard Roger-Vasselin	6^{6}	7^{7}	6
(Chinese Taipei) Chen Ti	7^{8}	6^{4}	3
(Germany) Matthias Bachinger	7^{9}	2	0
(France) Gary Lugassy	6^{7}	6	6
(Australia) Nathan Healey	4	7	6
(Denmark) Kenneth Carlsen	6	5	3
(Italy) Flavio Cipolla	3	2
31	(Brazil) Ricardo Mello	6	6

Second round
3	(France) Édouard Roger-Vasselin	6	7^{8}
(France) Gary Lugassy	4	6^{6}
(Australia) Nathan Healey	6	6
31	(Brazil) Ricardo Mello	3	2

Qualifying competition
3	(France) Édouard Roger-Vasselin	6^{7}	6	6	6^{2}	6
(Australia) Nathan Healey	7^{9}	2	1	7^{7}	3

=== Fourth qualifier ===
First round
4	(Canada) Frank Dancevic	7^{8}	6
(France) Thomas Oger	6^{6}	4
(Spain) Albert Portas	2	6	7
(Italy) Andrea Stoppini	6	4	9
(Pakistan) Aisam-ul-Haq Qureshi	6	6
(Spain) Héctor Ruiz-Cadenas	1	2
(Poland) Michał Przysiężny	6	6
17	(Brazil) Thiago Alves	3	4

Second round
4	(Canada) Frank Dancevic	6	6
(Italy) Andrea Stoppini	3	3
(Pakistan) Aisam-ul-Haq Qureshi	6	7^{7}
(Poland) Michał Przysiężny	2	6^{5}

Qualifying competition
4	(Canada) Frank Dancevic	6	6^{9}	2	6^{4}
(Pakistan) Aisam-ul-Haq Qureshi	4	7^{11}	6	7^{7}

=== Fifth qualifier ===
First round
5	(Italy) Daniele Bracciali	7^{8}	6
(Czech Republic) Jan Mertl	6^{6}	1
(Argentina) Cristian Villagrán	6	4	4
(Spain) Marcel Granollers	1	6	6
(Argentina) Eduardo Schwank	6^{3}	4
(Serbia) Dušan Vemić	7^{7}	6
(Romania) Victor Ioniță	2	0
18	(United States) Bobby Reynolds	6	6

Second round
5	(Italy) Daniele Bracciali	6	6
(Spain) Marcel Granollers	2	1
(Serbia) Dušan Vemić	6^{5}	6	3
18	(United States) Bobby Reynolds	7^{7}	1	6

Qualifying competition
5	(Italy) Daniele Bracciali	1	4	3
18	(United States) Bobby Reynolds	6	6	6

=== Sixth qualifier ===
First round
6	(Colombia) Santiago Giraldo	6	7
(Slovakia) Michal Mertiňák	3	5
WC	(United Kingdom) James Ward	7	0	3
(Japan) Go Soeda	5	6	6
(Costa Rica) Juan Antonio Marín	4	5
(Germany) Lars Burgsmüller	6	7
(Australia) Alun Jones	2	6	7
22	(Czech Republic) Bohdan Ulihrach	6	2	9

Second round
6	(Colombia) Santiago Giraldo	7^{7}	2	3
(Japan) Go Soeda	6^{2}	6	6
(Germany) Lars Burgsmüller	3	4
22	(Czech Republic) Bohdan Ulihrach	6	6

Qualifying competition
(Japan) Go Soeda	7	4	6	2	2
22	(Czech Republic) Bohdan Ulihrach	5	6	1	6	6

=== Seventh qualifier ===
First round
7	(United States) Kevin Kim	6	6^{4}	6
(Switzerland) Stéphane Bohli	4	7^{7}	1
(Argentina) Brian Dabul	3	2
(Israel) Harel Levy	6	6
(United States) Sam Warburg	4	6	7
WC	(United Kingdom) Richard Irwin	6	3	5
WC	(United Kingdom) Jim May	6	6
30	(Slovakia) Lukáš Lacko	4	3

Second round
7	(United States) Kevin Kim	4	7^{7}	6
(Israel) Harel Levy	6	6^{5}	3
(United States) Sam Warburg	6	6
WC	(United Kingdom) Jim May	3	4

Qualifying competition
7	(United States) Kevin Kim	6	6^{7}	2	1
(United States) Sam Warburg	2	7^{9}	6	6

=== Eighth qualifier ===
First round
8	(Italy) Federico Luzzi	6	2	6
WC	(United Kingdom) Tom Rushby	2	6	1
(Algeria) Lamine Ouahab	7	6
(South Africa) Wesley Whitehouse	5	3
WC	(United Kingdom) David Brewer	3	2
(United States) Zack Fleishman	6	6
(Germany) Benedikt Dorsch	4	2
28	(Spain) Pablo Andújar	6	6

Second round
8	(Italy) Federico Luzzi	6	6
(Algeria) Lamine Ouahab	3	2
(United States) Zack Fleishman
28	(Spain) Pablo Andújar	w/o

Qualifying competition
8	(Italy) Federico Luzzi	1	3	6^{4}
(United States) Zack Fleishman	6	6	7^{7}

=== Ninth qualifier ===
First round
9	(Greece) Konstantinos Economidis	4	5
Alt	(Japan) Takao Suzuki	6	7
(Italy) Marco Crugnola	6	6
(Argentina) Horacio Zeballos	3	2
WC	(United Kingdom) Neil Bamford	6^{4}	3
WC	(United Kingdom) Lee Childs	7^{7}	6
(Slovakia) Pavol Červenák	6	7^{7}
29	(Poland) Łukasz Kubot	4	6^{4}

Second round
Alt	(Japan) Takao Suzuki	3	4
(Italy) Marco Crugnola	6	6
WC	(United Kingdom) Lee Childs	6	4	12
(Slovakia) Pavol Červenák	3	6	10

Qualifying competition
(Italy) Marco Crugnola	1	6	3	4
WC	(United Kingdom) Lee Childs	6	3	6	6

=== Tenth qualifier ===
First round
10	(Colombia) Alejandro Falla	6	6
(Latvia) Andis Juška	1	3
(Czech Republic) Robin Vik	6^{5}	7	3
(United States) Scott Oudsema	7^{7}	5	6
PR	(Switzerland) Michel Kratochvil	6^{4}	7^{7}	5
(Spain) Marc López	7^{7}	6^{5}	7
(Spain) Gabriel Trujillo Soler	3	2
24	(Croatia) Roko Karanušić	6	6

Second round
10	(Colombia) Alejandro Falla	6	7
(United States) Scott Oudsema	2	5
(Spain) Marc López	7^{7}	0	6
24	(Croatia) Roko Karanušić	6^{3}	6	4

Qualifying competition
10	(Colombia) Alejandro Falla	7	7	6
(Spain) Marc López	5	5	3

=== Eleventh qualifier ===
First round
11	(Chile) Paul Capdeville	6	6
(Germany) Tobias Clemens	4	2
(Switzerland) George Bastl	6^{9}	2
(United States) Brian Wilson	7^{11}	6
(United States) Ryan Sweeting	7	6
(Czech Republic) Lukáš Rosol	5	2
(United States) Jesse Witten	4	2
27	(Luxembourg) Gilles Müller	6	6

Second round
11	(Chile) Paul Capdeville	1	7^{7}	6
(United States) Brian Wilson	6	6^{4}	2
(United States) Ryan Sweeting	3	6	4
27	(Luxembourg) Gilles Müller	6	2	6

Qualifying competition
11	(Chile) Paul Capdeville	3	5	7	6	4
27	(Luxembourg) Gilles Müller	6	7	5	4	6

=== Twelfth qualifier ===
First round
12	(South Africa) Rik de Voest	7	6
(Italy) Stefano Ianni	5	3
(Netherlands) Dennis van Scheppingen	4	4
(Argentina) Leonardo Mayer	6	6
(Czech Republic) Pavel Šnobel	6	7^{8}
WC	(Serbia) Nenad Zimonjić	4	6^{6}
(Czech Republic) Ivo Minář	4	6^{12}
32	(Belgium) Dick Norman	6	7^{14}

Second round
12	(South Africa) Rik de Voest	6	4	6
(Argentina) Leonardo Mayer	4	6	4
(Czech Republic) Pavel Šnobel	3	6	6
32	(Belgium) Dick Norman	6	3	3

Qualifying competition
12	(South Africa) Rik de Voest	6	7^{7}	3	6
(Czech Republic) Pavel Šnobel	1	6^{1}	6	3

=== Thirteenth qualifier ===
First round
Alt	(United States) Brendan Evans	1	4
(Belgium) Christophe Rochus	6	6
(Israel) Dudi Sela	6	7
(Italy) Uros Vico	2	5
(Canada) Frédéric Niemeyer	6	5	3
PR	(Spain) Álex Calatrava	3	7	6
(Australia) Wayne Arthurs	7	6
25	(Paraguay) Ramón Delgado	5	3

Second round
(Belgium) Christophe Rochus	7	6
(Israel) Dudi Sela	5	3
PR	(Spain) Álex Calatrava	6^{5}	6^{4}
(Australia) Wayne Arthurs	7^{7}	7^{7}

Qualifying competition
(Belgium) Christophe Rochus	3	6	7^{7}	5	4
(Australia) Wayne Arthurs	6	3	6^{5}	7	6

=== Fourteenth qualifier ===
First round
14	(Germany) Mischa Zverev	7	6
PR	(Romania) Răzvan Sabău	5	1
(Colombia) Carlos Salamanca	4	2
WC	(United Kingdom) Chris Eaton	6	6
(Spain) Marc Fornell Mestres	3	4
(Japan) Satoshi Iwabuchi	6	6
PR	(United States) Eric Nunez	2	2
20	(Italy) Stefano Galvani	6	6

Second round
14	(Germany) Mischa Zverev	7^{7}	6
WC	(United Kingdom) Chris Eaton	6^{5}	2
(Japan) Satoshi Iwabuchi	3	2
20	(Italy) Stefano Galvani	6	6

Qualifying competition
14	(Germany) Mischa Zverev	6	6	5	3	7
20	(Italy) Stefano Galvani	1	1	7	6	5

=== Fifteenth qualifier ===
First round
15	(Spain) Fernando Vicente	6^{6}	6	10
(United States) Rajeev Ram	7^{8}	2	8
(Romania) Victor Crivoi	3	7^{7}	0
(United States) Alex Kuznetsov	6	6^{3}	6
(Italy) Paolo Lorenzi	6	6
PR	(Spain) José Checa Calvo	3	2
(Switzerland) Michael Lammer	7^{7}	7^{7}
21	(Serbia) Ilija Bozoljac	6^{4}	6^{2}

Second round
15	(Spain) Fernando Vicente	6	6
(United States) Alex Kuznetsov	2	4
(Italy) Paolo Lorenzi	4	6	1
(Switzerland) Michael Lammer	6	3	6

Qualifying competition
15	(Spain) Fernando Vicente	6	0	6	1	9
(Switzerland) Michael Lammer	2	6	4	6	7

=== Sixteenth qualifier ===
First round
16	(Czech Republic) Tomáš Zíb	6	6
(Brazil) Franco Ferreiro	3	0
(Australia) Nick Lindahl	4	2
(Slovakia) Ivo Klec	6	6
Alt	(Denmark) Frederik Nielsen	7^{8}	6
(France) Nicolas Tourte	6^{6}	0
(France) Jérôme Haehnel	3	4
23	(France) Thierry Ascione	6	6

Second round
16	(Czech Republic) Tomáš Zíb	6	3	7
(Slovakia) Ivo Klec	3	6	5
Alt	(Denmark) Frederik Nielsen	6	7
23	(France) Thierry Ascione	4	5

Qualifying competition
16	(Czech Republic) Tomáš Zíb	3	3	6	6	6
Alt	(Denmark) Frederik Nielsen	6	6	4	3	2
