= 2007 Wimbledon Championships – Women's doubles qualifying =

Women's doubles qualifying
- 2007 Wimbledon Championships

Events
Singles	men	women		boys	girls
Doubles	men	women	mixed	boys	girls
WC Singles	men	women	quad
WC Doubles	men	women	quad
Legends	men	women	seniors

Qualification
Singles	men	women
Doubles	men	women
- Wimbledon Championships

Players and pairs who neither have high enough rankings nor receive wild cards may participate in a qualifying tournament held one week before the annual Wimbledon Tennis Championships.

== Seeds ==
1. (Chinese Taipei) Hsieh Su-wei / (Russia) Alla Kudryavtseva (qualified)
2. (Chinese Taipei) Chan Chin-wei / (Ukraine) Tetiana Luzhanska (first round)
3. (France) Stéphanie Foretz / (Tunisia) Selima Sfar (qualified)
4. (Latvia) Līga Dekmeijere / (India) Shikha Uberoi (first round)
5. (United States) Julie Ditty / (United States) Raquel Kops-Jones (qualified)
6. (New Zealand) Leanne Baker / (Australia) Nicole Kriz (first round)
7. (Czech Republic) Eva Birnerová / (Germany) Julia Schruff (first round)
8. (Uzbekistan) Akgul Amanmuradova / (Uzbekistan) Varvara Lepchenko (first round)

== Qualifiers ==
1. (Chinese Taipei) Hsieh Su-wei / (Russia) Alla Kudryavtseva
2. (United States) Julie Ditty / (United States) Raquel Kops-Jones
3. (France) Stéphanie Foretz / (Tunisia) Selima Sfar
4. (Sweden) Sofia Arvidsson / (United States) Lilia Osterloh

== Lucky losers ==
1. (Czech Republic) Andrea Hlaváčková / (Germany) Sandra Klösel
2. (Czech Republic) Hana Šromová / (Czech Republic) Klára Zakopalová
3. (United Kingdom) Anna Fitzpatrick / (United Kingdom) Emily Webley-Smith

== Qualifying draw ==
=== First qualifier ===
First round
1	(Chinese Taipei) Hsieh Su-wei (Russia) Alla Kudryavtseva	6	6
(Romania) Edina Gallovits (Canada) Aleksandra Wozniak	2	2
(Czech Republic) Andrea Hlaváčková (Germany) Sandra Klösel	6	6
7	(Czech Republic) Eva Birnerová (Germany) Julia Schruff	4	2

Qualifying competition
1	(Chinese Taipei) Hsieh Su-wei (Russia) Alla Kudryavtseva	6	6
(Czech Republic) Andrea Hlaváčková (Germany) Sandra Klösel	3	4

=== Second qualifier ===
First round
2	(Chinese Taipei) Chan Chin-wei (Ukraine) Tetiana Luzhanska	3	5
(Czech Republic) Hana Šromová (Czech Republic) Klára Zakopalová	6	7
(Russia) Ekaterina Bychkova (France) Youlia Fedossova	4	7	1
5	(United States) Julie Ditty (United States) Raquel Kops-Jones	6	5	6

Qualifying competition
(Czech Republic) Hana Šromová (Czech Republic) Klára Zakopalová	3	3
5	(United States) Julie Ditty (United States) Raquel Kops-Jones	6	6

=== Third qualifier ===
First round
3	(France) Stéphanie Foretz (Tunisia) Selima Sfar	6	6
(Switzerland) Timea Bacsinszky (Italy) Karin Knapp	4	0
(Ukraine) Olga Savchuk (Russia) Yaroslava Shvedova	6	6
8	(Uzbekistan) Akgul Amanmuradova (Uzbekistan) Varvara Lepchenko	2	4

Qualifying competition
3	(France) Stéphanie Foretz (Tunisia) Selima Sfar	6	6
(Ukraine) Olga Savchuk (Russia) Yaroslava Shvedova	2	4

=== Fourth qualifier ===
First round
4	(Latvia) Līga Dekmeijere (India) Shikha Uberoi	6	3	3
WC	(United Kingdom) Anna Fitzpatrick (United Kingdom) Emily Webley-Smith	3	6	6
Alt	(Sweden) Sofia Arvidsson (United States) Lilia Osterloh	6	6
6	(New Zealand) Leanne Baker (Australia) Nicole Kriz	4	3

Qualifying competition
WC	(United Kingdom) Anna Fitzpatrick (United Kingdom) Emily Webley-Smith	3	4
Alt	(Sweden) Sofia Arvidsson (United States) Lilia Osterloh	6	6
