= Neil Pauffley =

British tennis player

- Country (sports): Great Britain
- Residence: Maidenhead, England
- Born: 1989 or 1990 (age 35–36) Slough, England
- Height: 1.88 m (6 ft 2 in)
- Turned pro: 2007
- Plays: Right-handed (two-handed backhand)
- Prize money: US$78,663

Singles
- Career record: 0–0
- Career titles: 0
- Highest ranking: No. 406 (12 August 2013)

Grand Slam singles results
- Wimbledon: Q1 (2017)

Doubles
- Career record: 0–0
- Career titles: 0
- Highest ranking: No. 594 (4 January 2010)

Neil Pauffley is a former British professional tennis player and coach. He plays right handed. Pauffley has won 5 ITF Pro Futures Titles (4 x $10K & 1 x $15K) including the AEGON ITF $15K Futures tournament in Tipton, West Midlands.

== Career ==
Pauffley was born in 1989 or 1990 in Berkshire, England. As a junior, he was coached at Bisham Abbey by Viktor Roubanov and former Russian professional tennis player Olga Morozova. In 2007, he began his professional tennis career by competing in the boys' singles at Wimbledon. Pauffley later competed in the 2008 Australian Open. In 2015, he trained at the David Lloyd Tennis Centre in Newbury.

As a junior, he beat future World Number 3 Milos Raonic of Canada, and played other future top 50 players David Goffin (lost), Donald Young (lost) and Dušan Lajović (won).

After turning pro in 2007, he reached his first final in a Futures tournament in Ilkley, West Yorkshire in July 2009, losing to Martin Fischer of Austria, after beating future Top 120 ranked player Riccardo Ghedin of Italy.

In June 2010, he suffered a serious knee injury that resulted in him being unable to play for over 12 months, and on his return a stress fracture of the shin and twisted ankle that further prevented him from competing in 2011.

His return to the court in March 2012, saw him reach the semi-finals of the Futures tournament at Tipton, and in September of that year he secured his first title winning the Germany F17 Futures Final with a 6–4, 6–4 win over German Stefan Seifert in Hambach on an indoor carpet court.

A month later he reached the semi-final of the British Futures at Glasgow, after beating Daniel Evans and in November secured his second title, when winning the Czech F8 Futures title in Opava, Czech Republic with a 6–4, 2–6, 6–4 win over Roman Jebavý of the Czech Republic again on an indoor carpet court.

In May 2013, he reached the final of the Portuguese F7 Futures event in Coimbra, losing to Joao Domingues, and in July 2013 he reached another final, in Felixstowe, losing to Marcus Willis.

On 12 August 2013, he reached the highest singles ranking of his career of 406 ATP, and in November 2013 he won the German Futures title at Hambach for the second year running.

In 2014, he reached the final of the British Futures in Edinburgh in April, again losing to Marcus Willis, before beating Josh Goodall to claim the British Tour Masters Trophy in Nottingham in December.

In September 2015, Pauffley appeared at the semi finals of the British Futures at Nottingham, where he secured the 15K British Futures in November at Tipton, with a 6–4, 7–6^{(8)} win over Lloyd Glasspool.

Pauffley last competed professionally in September 2019 in the M25 Shrewsbury where he progressed to the competition's second round. He is a qualified tennis coach.

== Challenger and Futures finals ==
=== Singles: 12 (5–7) ===
Legend (singles) ATP Challenger Tour (0–0) ITF Futures Tour (5–7)	Titles by surface Hard (2–4) Clay (0–1) Grass (0–2) Carpet (3–0)

Result	W–L	Date	Tournament	Tier	Surface	Opponent	Score
Loss	0–1	Aug 2009	Great Britain F10, Ilkley	Futures	Grass	(Austria) Martin Fischer	2–6, 4–6
Win	1–1	Sep 2012	Germany F17, Hambach	Futures	Carpet (i)	(Germany) Stefan Seifert	6–4, 6–4
Win	2–1	Nov 2012	Czech Republic F8, Opava	Futures	Carpet (i)	(Czech Republic) Roman Jebavý	6–4, 2–6, 6–4
Loss	2–2	May 2013	Portugal F7, Coimbra	Futures	Hard	(Portugal) João Domingues	6–7^{(4–7)}, 3–6
Loss	2–3	Jul 2013	Great Britain F14, Felixstowe	Futures	Grass	(United Kingdom) Marcus Willis	2–6, 4–6
Win	3–3	Oct 2013	Germany F17, Hambach	Futures	Carpet (i)	(Slovakia) Adrian Sikora	5–7, 6–2, 6–0
Loss	3–4	May 2014	Great Britain F10, Edinburgh	Futures	Clay	(United Kingdom) Marcus Willis	1–6, 3–6
Win	4–4	Nov 2015	Great Britain F10, Tipton	Futures	Hard (i)	(United Kingdom) Lloyd Glasspool	6–4, 7–6^{(10–8)}
Loss	4–5	Sep 2016	Israel F12, Ashkelon	Futures	Hard	(United States) Connor Smith	1–6, 0–6
Win	5–5	Nov 2016	Great Britain F6, Barnstaple	Futures	Hard (i)	(Denmark) Frederik Nielsen	6–4, 6–4
Loss	5–6	Oct 2018	Egypt F22, Sharm el-Sheikh	Futures	Hard	(Spain) David Pérez Sanz	7–6^{(9–7)}, 4–6, 3–6
Loss	5–7	Oct 2018	Egypt F23, Sharm el-Sheikh	Futures	Hard	(Egypt) Karim-Mohamed Maamoun	3–6, 4–6

=== Doubles: 11 (2–9) ===
Legend (doubles) ATP Challenger Tour (0–0) ITF Futures Tour (2–9)	Titles by surface Hard (1–4) Clay (1–1) Grass (0–1) Carpet (0–3)

Result	W–L	Date	Tournament	Tier	Surface	Partner	Opponents	Score
Loss	0–1	Feb 2009	Germany F4, Mettmann	Futures	Carpet (i)	(Belarus) Nikolai Fidirko	(United Kingdom) Josh Goodall (United Kingdom) James Ward	6–4, 0–6, [4–10]
Loss	0–2	Jul 2009	Great Britain F9, Frinton-on-Sea	Futures	Grass	(United Kingdom) Marcus Willis	(Republic of Ireland) Tristan Farron-Mahon (Republic of Ireland) Colin O'Brien	7–6^{(7–5)}, 6–7^{(3–7)}, [6–10]
Loss	0–3	Oct 2013	Germany F13, Hambach	Futures	Carpet (i)	(Austria) Nikolaus Moser	(Germany) Andreas Mies (Germany) Oscar Otte	5–7, 4–4 ret.
Loss	0–4	Jul 2015	Germany F9, Essen	Futures	Clay	(United Kingdom) David Rice	(Germany) Marvin Netuschil (Germany) Philipp Scholz	6–1, 6–7^{(4–7)}, [6–10]
Loss	0–5	Sep 2015	Great Britain F8, Roehampton	Futures	Hard	(United Kingdom) David Rice	(Republic of Ireland) David O'Hare (United Kingdom) Joe Salisbury	2–6, 6–4, [5–10]
Win	1–5	Jul 2016	Macedonia F3, Skopje	Futures	Clay	(United Kingdom) Richard Gabb	(North Macedonia) Tomislav Jotovski (North Macedonia) Predrag Rusevski	6–4, 6–4
Loss	1–6	Oct 2016	Germany F13, Hambach	Futures	Carpet (i)	(United Kingdom) Keelan Oakley	(Czech Republic) Marek Jaloviec (Czech Republic) Michal Konečný	7–5, 4–6, [6–10]
Win	2–6	Sep 2017	Great Britain F6, Barnstaple	Futures	Hard (i)	(Republic of Ireland) Peter Bothwell	(United Kingdom) Robert Carter (United Kingdom) Ryan Peniston	6–4, 6–7^{(5–7)}, [10–6]
Loss	2–7	Oct 2017	Germany F14, Oberhaching	Futures	Hard (i)	(Switzerland) Marc-Andrea Hüsler	(Germany) Johannes Harteis (Germany) Daniel Masur	6–4, 5–7, [5–10]
Loss	2–8	Feb 2018	Great Britain F1, Glasgow	Futures	Hard (i)	(United Kingdom) Marcus Willis	(Austria) Matthias Haim (Germany) Jakob Sude	3–6, 7–6^{(7–5)}, [6–10]
Loss	2–9	Nov 2018	Thailand F7, Nonthaburi	Futures	Hard	(Chinese Taipei) Cing-Yang Meng	(Japan) Hiroyasu Ehara (Thailand) Pruchya Isaro	2–6, 3–6
