= 2007 Wimbledon Championships – Boys' doubles =

Boys' doubles
- 2007 Wimbledon Championships

Final
- Champions: (Paraguay) Daniel Alejandro López (Italy) Matteo Trevisan
- Runners-up: (Czech Republic) Roman Jebavý (Slovakia) Martin Kližan
- Score: 7–6^{(7–5)}, 4–6, [10–8]

Events
Singles	men	women		boys	girls
Doubles	men	women	mixed	boys	girls
WC Singles	men	women	quad
WC Doubles	men	women	quad
Legends	men	women	seniors
← 2006 ·	Wimbledon Championships	· 2008 →

Kellen Damico and Nathaniel Schnugg were the defending champions but Schnugg did not compete. Damico partnered with Jonathan Eysseric but lost in the second round to Roman Jebavý and Martin Kližan.

Daniel Alejandro López and Matteo Trevisan defeated Jebavý and Kližan in the final, 7–6^{(7–5)}, 4–6, [10–8] to win the boys' doubles tennis title at the 2007 Wimbledon Championships.

== Seeds ==
1. (United States) Kellen Damico / (France) Jonathan Eysseric (second round)
2. (Australia) Greg Jones / (Australia) Brydan Klein (second round)
3. (Australia) Stephen Donald / (Australia) John-Patrick Smith (first round)
4. (Ecuador) Patricio Alvarado / (Brazil) Fernando Romboli (first round)
5. (Chile) Guillermo Rivera Aránguiz / (Chile) Ricardo Urzúa-Rivera (first round)
6. (Italy) Thomas Fabbiano / (Belarus) Andrei Karatchenia (quarterfinals)
7. (Paraguay) Daniel Alejandro López / (Italy) Matteo Trevisan (champions)
8. (Moldova) Radu Albot / (Romania) Dragoș Cristian Mirtea (first round)

== Draw ==
=== Key ===
- Q = Qualifier
- WC = Wild card
- LL = Lucky loser
- Alt = Alternate
- SE = Special exempt
- PR = Protected ranking
- ITF = ITF entry
- JE = Junior exempt
- w/o = Walkover
- r = Retired
- d = Defaulted
- SR = Special ranking

=== Finals ===
Semifinals
(Czech Republic) Roman Jebavý (Slovakia) Martin Kližan	7	6
(Netherlands) Thomas Schoorel (Netherlands) Tim van Terheijden	5	2
(United States) Johnny Hamui (United States) Donald Young	3	6	[4]
7	(Paraguay) Daniel Alejandro López (Italy) Matteo Trevisan	6	2	[10]

Final
(Czech Republic) Roman Jebavý (Slovakia) Martin Kližan	6^{5}	6	[8]
7	(Paraguay) Daniel Alejandro López (Italy) Matteo Trevisan	7^{7}	4	[10]

=== Top half ===
First round
1	(United States) Kellen Damico (France) Jonathan Eysseric	6	6
(Belarus) Uladzimir Ignatik (Russia) Nikita Zotov	3	2
(Brazil) Henrique Cunha (Colombia) Alejandro González	1	3
(Czech Republic) Roman Jebavý (Slovakia) Martin Kližan	6	6
(Czech Republic) Jiří Košler (Thailand) Kittipong Wachiramanowong	7	5	[10]
(Russia) Evgeny Donskoy (Poland) Mateusz Szmigiel	5	7	[4]
(Belgium) Frédéric de Fays (France) Stéphane Piro	4	6	[8]
6	(Italy) Thomas Fabbiano (Belarus) Andrei Karatchenia	6	4	[10]
4	(Ecuador) Patricio Alvarado (Brazil) Fernando Romboli	6^{2}	3
(Germany) Dmitris Kleftakos (Australia) Mark Verryth	7^{7}	6
(Venezuela) Roberto Maytín (Australia) Andrew Thomas	6	6
(Portugal) Gastão Elias (Mexico) César Ramírez	4	2
WC	(United Kingdom) Niall Angus (United Kingdom) Thomas Knights	6	6
(Madagascar) Lofo Ramiaramanana (Thailand) Peerakiat Siriluethaiwattana	2	4
(Netherlands) Thomas Schoorel (Netherlands) Tim van Terheijden	6	6
5	(Chile) Guillermo Rivera Aránguiz (Chile) Ricardo Urzúa-Rivera	2	3

Second round
1	(United States) K Damico (France) J Eysseric	6	0	[7]
(Czech Republic) R Jebavý (Slovakia) M Kližan	4	6	[10]
(Czech Republic) J Košler (Thailand) K Wachiramanowong	4	6^{5}
6	(Italy) T Fabbiano (Belarus) A Karatchenia	6	7^{7}
(Germany) D Kleftakos (Australia) M Verryth	w/o
(Venezuela) R Maytín (Australia) A Thomas
WC	(United Kingdom) N Angus (United Kingdom) T Knights	2	3
(Netherlands) T Schoorel (Netherlands) T van Terheijden	6	6

Quarterfinals
(Czech Republic) R Jebavý (Slovakia) M Kližan	7^{7}	3	[10]
6	(Italy) T Fabbiano (Belarus) A Karatchenia	6^{5}	6	[4]
(Venezuela) R Maytín (Australia) A Thomas	4	2
(Netherlands) T Schoorel (Netherlands) T van Terheijden	6	6

Semifinals
(Czech Republic) R Jebavý (Slovakia) M Kližan	7	6
(Netherlands) T Schoorel (Netherlands) T van Terheijden	5	2

=== Bottom half ===
First round
8	(Moldova) Radu Albot (Romania) Dragoș Cristian Mirtea	3	4
(United States) Johnny Hamui (United States) Donald Young	6	6
(South Africa) Damian Hume (India) Rupesh Roy	1	6	[5]
Alt	(United States) Devin Britton (United States) Austin Krajicek	6	3	[10]
(Russia) Danila Arsenov (United States) Mateusz Kecki	6	6
(Belgium) Germain Gigounon (Chinese Taipei) Peng Hsien-yin	3	3
WC	(United Kingdom) Neil Pauffley (United Kingdom) Marcus Willis	3	6	[10]
3	(Australia) Stephen Donald (Australia) John-Patrick Smith	6	3	[8]
7	(Paraguay) Daniel Alejandro López (Italy) Matteo Trevisan	4	6	[10]
WC	(United Kingdom) Mathew James (United Kingdom) Sean Thornley	6	4	[8]
(Lithuania) Ričardas Berankis (Indonesia) Christopher Rungkat	6	3	[10]
(United Kingdom) Graeme Dyce (United Kingdom) Dan Evans	3	6	[4]
(United Kingdom) Daniel Cox (United Kingdom) David Rice	6^{1}	7	[4]
WC	(United Kingdom) George Coupland (United Kingdom) Daniel Smethurst	7^{7}	5	[10]
(North Macedonia) Ilija Martinoski (Slovenia) Janez Semrajc	7^{8}	4	[4]
2	(Australia) Greg Jones (Australia) Brydan Klein	6^{6}	6	[10]

Second round
(United States) J Hamui (United States) D Young	7^{7}	6
Alt	(United States) D Britton (United States) A Krajicek	6^{3}	3
(Russia) D Arsenov (United States) M Kecki	6	5	[10]
WC	(United Kingdom) N Pauffley (United Kingdom) M Willis	3	7	[6]
7	(Paraguay) DA López (Italy) M Trevisan	6	4	[10]
(Lithuania) R Berankis (Indonesia) C Rungkat	4	6	[7]
WC	(United Kingdom) G Coupland (United Kingdom) D Smethurst	4	6	[10]
2	(Australia) G Jones (Australia) B Klein	6	3	[5]

Quarterfinals
(United States) J Hamui (United States) D Young	7^{7}	6
(Russia) D Arsenov (United States) M Kecki	6^{4}	3
7	(Paraguay) DA López (Italy) M Trevisan	3	6	[10]
(United Kingdom) G Coupland (United Kingdom) D Smethurst	6	4	[2]

Semifinals
(United States) J Hamui (United States) D Young	3	6	[4]
7	(Paraguay) DA López (Italy) M Trevisan	6	2	[10]
