= 2007 Wimbledon Championships – Men's singles =

Men's singles
- 2007 Wimbledon Championships

Final
- Champion: (Switzerland) Roger Federer
- Runner-up: (Spain) Rafael Nadal
- Score: 7–6^{(9–7)}, 4–6, 7–6^{(7–3)}, 2–6, 6–2

Details
- Draw: 128 (16 Q / 8 WC )
- Seeds: 32

Events
Singles	men	women		boys	girls
Doubles	men	women	mixed	boys	girls
WC Singles	men	women	quad
WC Doubles	men	women	quad
Legends	men	women	seniors
← 2006 ·	Wimbledon Championships	· 2008 →

Four-time defending champion Roger Federer defeated Rafael Nadal in the final, 7–6^{(9–7)}, 4–6, 7–6^{(7–3)}, 2–6, 6–2 to win the gentlemen's singles tennis title at the 2007 Wimbledon Championships. It was his Open Era record-equaling fifth consecutive Wimbledon title (tying Björn Borg), and his eleventh major title overall. It was the second of three consecutive years when Federer and Nadal would contest the Wimbledon final.

== Seeds ==
1. (Switzerland) Roger Federer (champion)
2. (Spain) Rafael Nadal (final)
3. (United States) Andy Roddick (quarterfinals)
4. (Serbia) Novak Djokovic (semifinals, retired)
5. (Chile) Fernando González (third round)
6. (Russia) Nikolay Davydenko (fourth round)
7. (Czech Republic) Tomáš Berdych (quarterfinals)
8. (United Kingdom) Andy Murray (withdrew)
9. (United States) James Blake (third round)
10. (Cyprus) Marcos Baghdatis (quarterfinals)
11. (Spain) Tommy Robredo (second round)
12. (France) Richard Gasquet (semifinals)
13. (Germany) Tommy Haas (fourth round, withdrew)
14. (Russia) Mikhail Youzhny (fourth round)
15. (Croatia) Ivan Ljubičić (third round)
16. (Australia) Lleyton Hewitt (fourth round)

17. (Spain) David Ferrer (second round)
18. (Finland) Jarkko Nieminen (third round)
19. (Sweden) Jonas Björkman (fourth round)
20. (Spain) Juan Carlos Ferrero (quarterfinals)
21. (Russia) Dmitry Tursunov (third round)
22. (Argentina) Guillermo Cañas (third round)
23. (Argentina) David Nalbandian (third round)
24. (Argentina) Juan Ignacio Chela (second round)
25. (Spain) Carlos Moyá (first round)
26. (Russia) Marat Safin (third round)
27. (Germany) Philipp Kohlschreiber (first round)
28. (Sweden) Robin Söderling (third round)
29. (Argentina) Agustín Calleri (second round)
30. (Italy) Filippo Volandri (first round)
31. (Slovakia) Dominik Hrbatý (first round)
32. (Argentina) Juan Mónaco (first round)

Click on the seed number of a player to go to their draw section.

Mario Ančić was originally seeded #18 but withdrew due to illness before the tournament draw was made. All original seeds from 19 to 31 moved up one place, and a new #31 seed was added.

Andy Murray withdrew due to a wrist injury. He was replaced in the draw by lucky loser Kevin Kim.

== Draw ==
=== Key ===
- Q = Qualifier
- WC = Wild card
- LL = Lucky loser
- Alt = Alternate
- ITF = ITF entry
- PR = Protected ranking
- SR = Special ranking
- SE = Special exempt
- JE = Junior exempt
- JR = Junior Accelerator Programme entrant
- CO = College Accelerator Programme entrant
- NG = Next Gen Accelerator Program entrant
- w/o = Walkover
- r = Retired
- d = Defaulted

=== Finals ===
Quarterfinals
1	(Switzerland) Roger Federer	7^{7}	3	6	6
20	(Spain) Juan Carlos Ferrero	6^{2}	6	1	3
3	(United States) Andy Roddick	6	6	6^{2}	6^{3}	6
12	(France) Richard Gasquet	4	4	7^{7}	7^{7}	8
10	(Cyprus) Marcos Baghdatis	6^{4}	6^{9}	7^{7}	6	5
4	(Serbia) Novak Djokovic	7^{7}	7^{11}	6^{3}	4	7
7	(Czech Republic) Tomáš Berdych	6^{1}	4	2
2	(Spain) Rafael Nadal	7^{7}	6	6

Semifinals
1	(Switzerland) Roger Federer	7	6	6
12	(France) Richard Gasquet	5	3	4
4	(Serbia) Novak Djokovic	6	1	1^{r}
2	(Spain) Rafael Nadal	3	6	4

Final
1	(Switzerland) Roger Federer	7^{9}	4	7^{7}	2	6
2	(Spain) Rafael Nadal	6^{7}	6	6^{3}	6	2

=== Top half ===
==== Section 1 ====
First round
1	(Switzerland) R Federer	6	6	6
(Russia) T Gabashvili	3	2	4
(Argentina) JM del Potro	3	6	6	6
(Italy) D Sanguinetti	6	3	4	4
Q	(Pakistan) A-u-H Qureshi	6	6	7^{8}
Q	(United Kingdom) L Childs	3	4	6^{6}
Q	(South Africa) R de Voest	6^{5}	4	5
26	(Russia) M Safin	7^{7}	6	7
21	(Russia) D Tursunov	7^{7}	6	6^{7}	6
(Spain) N Almagro	6^{2}	4	7^{9}	3
(Germany) M Berrer	6	6	6
(Spain) A Montañés	3	3	2
Q	(Czech Republic) T Zíb	4	7^{7}	3	6	6
(Argentina) D Hartfield	6	6^{4}	6	3	4
Q	(United States) Z Fleishman	3	4	2
13	(Germany) T Haas	6	6	6

Second round
1	(Switzerland) R Federer	6	7	6
(Argentina) JM del Potro	2	5	1
Q	(Pakistan) A-u-H Qureshi	4	2	6^{4}
26	(Russia) M Safin	6	6	7^{7}
21	(Russia) D Tursunov	4	6	6	6
(Germany) M Berrer	6	4	4	4
Q	(Czech Republic) T Zíb	3	6^{5}	4
13	(Germany) T Haas	6	7^{7}	6

Third round
1	(Switzerland) R Federer	6	6	7^{7}
26	(Russia) M Safin	1	4	6^{4}
21	(Russia) D Tursunov	6	4	6^{5}	4
13	(Germany) T Haas	1	6	7^{7}	6

Fourth round
1	(Switzerland) R Federer
13	(Germany) T Haas	w/o

==== Section 2 ====
First round
9	(United States) J Blake	6	6	6
PR	(Russia) I Andreev	3	4	4
(Argentina) JP Guzmán	4	4	1
(Romania) A Pavel	6	6	6
Q	(Luxembourg) G Müller	6	6^{6}	4
(Spain) Ó Hernández	2	7^{8}	3^{r}
(Czech Republic) J Hájek	7^{7}	6	3	2	5
20	(Spain) JC Ferrero	6^{5}	4	6	6	7
27	(Germany) P Kohlschreiber	6^{4}	4	4
(France) F Serra	7^{7}	6	6
(Austria) A Peya	6	6	3	4	3
(Serbia) J Tipsarević	4	3	6	6	6
Q	(Colombia) A Falla	7^{7}	6	6
(United States) S Querrey	6^{5}	1	4
(United States) R Ginepri	6	6^{4}	2	2
5	(Chile) F González	3	7^{7}	6	6

Second round
9	(United States) J Blake	6	6	6
(Romania) A Pavel	4	3	3
Q	(Luxembourg) G Müller	4	4	7^{7}	6^{8}
20	(Spain) JC Ferrero	6	6	6^{2}	7^{10}
(France) F Serra	3	2	7^{7}	6	2
(Serbia) J Tipsarević	6	6	6^{3}	3	6
Q	(Colombia) A Falla	6	3	4	6^{1}
5	(Chile) F González	4	6	6	7^{7}

Third round
9	(United States) J Blake	6	3	3	6^{4}
20	(Spain) JC Ferrero	3	6	6	7^{7}
(Serbia) J Tipsarević	6	3	6	4	8
5	(Chile) F González	3	6	3	6	6

Fourth round
20	(Spain) JC Ferrero	7	6	7^{7}
(Serbia) J Tipsarević	5	3	6^{5}

==== Section 3 ====
First round
3	(United States) A Roddick	6	7	7^{7}
PR	(United States) J Gimelstob	1	5	6^{3}
(Thailand) D Udomchoke	6	7	6
(Argentina) C Berlocq	4	5	3
(Spain) F Verdasco	6	6	6
Q	(United States) B Reynolds	4	4	3
(Italy) A Seppi	7^{10}	6	6
31	(Slovakia) D Hrbatý	6^{8}	1	2
17	(Spain) D Ferrer	6	6	6
(Argentina) S Roitman	3	3	1
(France) P-H Mathieu	7^{7}	6	6
(Czech Republic) R Štěpánek	6^{4}	2	2
(France) M Gicquel	6	4	4	4
(Czech Republic) J Hernych	0	6	6	6
(United States) V Spadea	4	4	6	6^{4}
15	(Croatia) I Ljubičić	6	6	4	7^{7}

Second round
3	(United States) A Roddick	6	6	7^{7}
(Thailand) D Udomchoke	3	4	6^{3}
(Spain) F Verdasco	6	6	6
(Italy) A Seppi	3	2	4
17	(Spain) D Ferrer	3	4	3
(France) P-H Mathieu	6	6	6
(Czech Republic) J Hernych	4	3	4
15	(Croatia) I Ljubičić	6	6	6

Third round
3	(United States) A Roddick	6	6	7^{7}
(Spain) F Verdasco	3	4	6^{2}
(France) P-H Mathieu	4	7	6	6
15	(Croatia) I Ljubičić	6	5	2	3

Fourth round
3	(United States) A Roddick	6	7	7^{8}
(France) P-H Mathieu	2	5	6^{6}

==== Section 4 ====
First round
12	(France) R Gasquet	6	6	6
Q	(Czech Republic) B Ulihrach	3	4	4
(France) A Clément	3	6	6^{5}	4
Q	(France) N Mahut	6	3	7^{7}	6
WC	(United Kingdom) J Baker	6^{2}	2	3
Q	(France) É Roger-Vasselin	7^{7}	6	6
(Germany) B Becker	6	6	4	4	8
24	(Argentina) JI Chela	3	4	6	6	10
25	(Spain) C Moyá	3	6	7	2	11
(United Kingdom) T Henman	6	1	5	6	13
WC	(United Kingdom) J Goodall	1	4	4
(Spain) F López	6	6	6
WC	(France) J-W Tsonga	7^{7}	7	6
(France) J Benneteau	6^{4}	5	4
(Ecuador) N Lapentti	2	6	4	6	6
LL	(United States) K Kim	6	2	6	3	4

Second round
12	(France) R Gasquet	6	6	6
Q	(France) N Mahut	4	3	4
Q	(France) É Roger-Vasselin	7^{7}	6	7
24	(Argentina) JI Chela	6^{3}	4	5
(United Kingdom) T Henman	6^{3}	6^{5}	6	6	1
(Spain) F López	7^{7}	7^{7}	3	2	6
WC	(France) J-W Tsonga	6	6	6
(Ecuador) N Lapentti	4	2	3

Third round
12	(France) R Gasquet	6	6	6
Q	(France) É Roger-Vasselin	3	4	2
(Spain) F López	3	6^{4}	3
WC	(France) J-W Tsonga	6	7^{7}	6

Fourth round
12	(France) R Gasquet	6	6	6
WC	(France) J-W Tsonga	4	3	4

=== Bottom half ===
==== Section 5 ====
First round
6	(Russia) N Davydenko	7^{14}	6	7^{7}
(Russia) E Korolev	6^{12}	4	6^{5}
WC	(United Kingdom) A Bogdanovic	6^{2}	4	4
(Australia) C Guccione	7^{7}	6	6
(France) G Monfils	6	7^{7}	6
(Sweden) T Johansson	4	6^{5}	2
(Belgium) K Vliegen	6	6	7^{7}
32	(Argentina) J Mónaco	4	3	6^{3}
23	(Argentina) D Nalbandian	6	6	6
Q	(Germany) M Zverev	3	4	2
LL	(Canada) F Dancevic	6	6	6
(Austria) S Koubek	2	4	2
(France) N Devilder	6^{3}	6	7	6
(Argentina) M Zabaleta	7^{7}	4	5	4
(Latvia) E Gulbis	6	4	3	2
10	(Cyprus) M Baghdatis	3	6	6	6

Second round
6	(Russia) N Davydenko	3	5	7^{7}	6	6
(Australia) C Guccione	6	7	6^{5}	4	2
(France) G Monfils	7	7^{7}	7^{7}
(Belgium) K Vliegen	5	6^{4}	6^{1}
23	(Argentina) D Nalbandian	6	6	5	6
LL	(Canada) F Dancevic	2	3	7	3
(France) N Devilder	0	6^{5}	7^{7}	2
10	(Cyprus) M Baghdatis	6	7^{7}	6^{4}	6

Third round
6	(Russia) N Davydenko	6	7	6
(France) G Monfils	3	5	3
23	(Argentina) D Nalbandian	2	5	0
10	(Cyprus) M Baghdatis	6	7	6

Fourth round
6	(Russia) N Davydenko	6^{5}	6^{5}	3
10	(Cyprus) M Baghdatis	7^{7}	7^{7}	6

==== Section 6 ====
First round
16	(Australia) L Hewitt	7	6	7
WC	(United Kingdom) R Bloomfield	5	3	5
(Spain) G García López	6	6^{5}	4	4
(Italy) S Bolelli	4	7^{7}	6	6
(Belarus) M Mirnyi	6	6	2
(Chinese Taipei) Y-h Lu	3	4	1^{r}
(Spain) I Navarro	6^{3}	3	1
22	(Argentina) G Cañas	7^{7}	6	6
30	(Italy) F Volandri	3	6^{6}	1
PR	(Germany) N Kiefer	6	7^{8}	6
(France) F Santoro	4	7^{7}	7^{7}	3	6
(Croatia) I Karlović	6	6^{4}	6^{3}	6	4
(United States) A Delic	6	6	5	6
(Czech Republic) L Dlouhý	3	4	7	4
(Italy) P Starace	0	3	4
4	(Serbia) N Djokovic	6	6	6

Second round
16	(Australia) L Hewitt	6	6	6
(Italy) S Bolelli	2	2	1
(Belarus) M Mirnyi	7^{7}	1	6^{4}	6^{4}
22	(Argentina) G Cañas	6^{4}	6	7^{7}	7^{7}
PR	(Germany) N Kiefer	6	6	6
(France) F Santoro	4	3	4
(United States) A Delic	3	6	3	6^{4}
4	(Serbia) N Djokovic	6	3	6	7^{7}

Third round
16	(Australia) L Hewitt	6	3	6	6
22	(Argentina) G Cañas	4	6	3	4
PR	(Germany) N Kiefer	6^{4}	7^{8}	2	6^{5}
4	(Serbia) N Djokovic	7^{7}	6^{6}	6	7^{7}

Fourth round
16	(Australia) L Hewitt	6^{8}	6^{2}	6	6^{5}
4	(Serbia) N Djokovic	7^{10}	7^{7}	4	7^{7}

==== Section 7 ====
First round
7	(Czech Republic) T Berdych	7^{7}	6	6
(Chile) N Massú	6^{5}	4	2
(Switzerland) S Wawrinka	4	4	1
(France) M Llodra	6	6	6
(South Korea) H-t Lee	6	6	6
(Argentina) M Vassallo Argüello	4	2	3
(Peru) L Horna	2	6^{4}	5
29	(Argentina) A Calleri	6	7^{7}	7
19	(Sweden) J Björkman	6	6	6
Q	(Spain) F Vicente	3	1	2
(Russia) I Kunitsyn	3	4	7^{7}	7^{10}	2
Q	(Chinese Taipei) J Wang	6	6	6^{5}	6^{8}	6
Q	(Australia) W Arthurs	6^{7}	6^{7}	7^{7}	6	6
WC	(Netherlands) T de Bakker	7^{9}	7^{9}	6^{4}	4	4
(United States) R Kendrick	2	6	3	7^{7}	3
11	(Spain) T Robredo	6	3	6	6^{5}	6

Second round
7	(Czech Republic) T Berdych	7^{7}	7^{7}	3	7^{7}
(France) M Llodra	6^{4}	6^{2}	6	6^{4}
(South Korea) H-t Lee	7^{8}	6	6^{3}	6
29	(Argentina) A Calleri	6^{6}	4	7^{7}	3
19	(Sweden) J Björkman	6	6	6^{8}	6
Q	(Chinese Taipei) Y-t Wang	0	3	7^{10}	4
Q	(Australia) W Arthurs	6	7^{7}	6
11	(Spain) T Robredo	3	6^{5}	3

Third round
7	(Czech Republic) T Berdych	6	7^{7}	7^{7}
(South Korea) H-t Lee	4	6^{2}	6^{3}
19	(Sweden) J Björkman	6	6	6
Q	(Australia) W Arthurs	2	1	4

Fourth round
7	(Czech Republic) T Berdych	6	6	6^{6}	6
19	(Sweden) J Björkman	4	0	7^{8}	0

==== Section 8 ====
First round
14	(Russia) M Youzhny	6	6	6
(Denmark) K Pless	4	2	4
WC	(Croatia) M Čilić	6	5	4	6	3
(France) G Simon	3	7	6	4	6
(Germany) F Mayer	6	6	6
Q	(United States) S Warburg	4	2	2
(United States) M Russell	3	2	5
18	(Finland) J Nieminen	6	6	7
28	(Sweden) R Söderling	6	6	6
(Belgium) O Rochus	3	2	2
WC	(United Kingdom) J Marray	2	6^{0}	5
(France) S Grosjean	6	7^{7}	7
(Austria) W Eschauer	6	3	6	6
(Spain) R Ramírez Hidalgo	2	6	4	3
(United States) M Fish	3	6^{4}	3
2	(Spain) R Nadal	6	7^{7}	6

Second round
14	(Russia) M Youzhny	6	4	3	7	6
(France) G Simon	4	6	6	5	4
(Germany) F Mayer	6	3	6^{2}	6	3
18	(Finland) J Nieminen	3	6	7^{7}	2	6
28	(Sweden) R Söderling	6	3	6	6
(France) S Grosjean	3	6	3	2
(Austria) W Eschauer	2	4	1
2	(Spain) R Nadal	6	6	6

Third round
14	(Russia) M Youzhny	7	7^{7}	6
18	(Finland) J Nieminen	5	6^{5}	3
28	(Sweden) R Söderling	4	4	7^{9}	6	5
2	(Spain) R Nadal	6	6	6^{7}	4	7

Fourth round
14	(Russia) M Youzhny	6	6	1	2	2
2	(Spain) R Nadal	4	3	6	6	6

Preceded by 2007 French Open – Men's singles	Grand Slam men's singles	Succeeded by 2007 US Open – Men's singles
