= 2007 Wimbledon Championships – Women's singles =

Women's singles
- 2007 Wimbledon Championships

Final
- Champion: (United States) Venus Williams
- Runner-up: (France) Marion Bartoli
- Score: 6–4, 6–1

Details
- Draw: 128 (12Q / 8WC)
- Seeds: 32

Events
Singles	men	women		boys	girls
Doubles	men	women	mixed	boys	girls
WC Singles	men	women	quad
WC Doubles	men	women	quad
Legends	men	women	seniors
- Wimbledon Championships

Venus Williams defeated Marion Bartoli in the final, 6–4, 6–1 to win the ladies' singles tennis title at the 2007 Wimbledon Championships. It was her fourth Wimbledon singles title and sixth major singles title overall. Williams, ranked 31st at the time and seeded 23rd, was the lowest-ranked and lowest-seeded woman ever to win Wimbledon (a record later surpassed by Markéta Vondroušová in 2023). Williams became the first women's champion to earn the same amount of prize money as the men's champion, following the tournament's decision to award equal pay for the first time that year: a cause championed by Williams herself.

Amélie Mauresmo was the defending champion, but lost to Nicole Vaidišová in the fourth round.

Bartoli reached her first major final after a semifinal victory over world No. 1 Justine Henin that was described as one of the biggest shocks in Wimbledon history.

This was the first Wimbledon main draw appearance of future champion and world No. 1 Angelique Kerber, who lost to Anna Chakvetadze in the first round.

== Seeds ==
1. (Belgium) Justine Henin (semifinals)
2. (Russia) Maria Sharapova (fourth round)
3. (Serbia) Jelena Janković (fourth round)
4. (France) Amélie Mauresmo (fourth round)
5. (Russia) Svetlana Kuznetsova (quarterfinals)
6. (Serbia) Ana Ivanovic (semifinals)
7. (United States) Serena Williams (quarterfinals)
8. (Russia) Anna Chakvetadze (third round)
9. (Switzerland) Martina Hingis (third round)
10. (Slovakia) Daniela Hantuchová (fourth round)
11. (Russia) Nadia Petrova (fourth round)
12. (Russia) Elena Dementieva (third round)
13. (Russia) Dinara Safina (second round)
14. (Czech Republic) Nicole Vaidišová (quarterfinals)
15. (Switzerland) Patty Schnyder (fourth round)
16. (Israel) Shahar Pe'er (third round)

17. (France) Tatiana Golovin (second round)
18. (France) Marion Bartoli (final)
19. (Slovenia) Katarina Srebotnik (third round)
20. (Austria) Sybille Bammer (second round)
21. (Italy) Tathiana Garbin (second round)
22. (Spain) Anabel Medina Garrigues (first round)
23. (United States) Venus Williams (champion)
24. (Ukraine) Alona Bondarenko (third round)
25. (Czech Republic) Lucie Šafářová (third round)
26. (Japan) Ai Sugiyama (third round)
27. (Australia) Samantha Stosur (second round)
28. (Italy) Mara Santangelo (third round)
29. (Italy) Francesca Schiavone (second round)
30. (Russia) Olga Puchkova (first round)
31. (Netherlands) Michaëlla Krajicek (quarterfinals)
32. (Germany) Martina Müller (second round)

Click on the seed number of a player to go to their draw section.

== Draw ==
Key

- Q = Qualifier
- WC = Wild card
- LL = Lucky loser
- Alt = Alternate
- ITF = ITF entry
- PR = Protected ranking
- SR = Special ranking
- SE = Special exempt
- JE = Junior exempt
- JR = Junior Accelerator Programme entrant
- CO = College Accelerator Programme entrant
- NG = Next Gen Accelerator Program entrant
- w/o = Walkover
- r = Retired
- d = Defaulted

=== Finals ===
Quarterfinals
1	(Belgium) Justine Henin	6	3	6
7	(United States) Serena Williams	4	6	3
18	(France) Marion Bartoli	3	6	6
31	(Netherlands) Michaëlla Krajicek	6	3	2
6	(Serbia) Ana Ivanovic	4	6	7
14	(Czech Republic) Nicole Vaidišová	6	2	5
5	(Russia) Svetlana Kuznetsova	3	4
23	(United States) Venus Williams	6	6

Semifinals
1	(Belgium) Justine Henin	6	5	1
18	(France) Marion Bartoli	1	7	6
6	(Serbia) Ana Ivanovic	2	4
23	(United States) Venus Williams	6	6

Final
18	(France) Marion Bartoli	4	1
23	(United States) Venus Williams	6	6

=== Top half ===
==== Section 1 ====
First round
1	(Belgium) J Henin	6	6
Q	(Argentina) J Cravero	3	0
(Switzerland) T Bacsinszky	4	5
(Russia) V Dushevina	6	7
(China) T Sun	3	1
(France) É Loit	6	6
(Russia) E Vesnina	6	6
30	(Russia) O Puchkova	1	3
24	(Ukraine) A Bondarenko	6	6
(United States) J Craybas	1	2
Q	(Hungary) Á Szávay	6	6
(Czech Republic) E Birnerová	4	1
(United States) A Harkleroad	2	1
(Italy) R Vinci	6	6
(France) C Pin	1	6	6
15	(Switzerland) P Schnyder	6	4	8

Second round
1	(Belgium) J Henin	6	6
(Russia) V Dushevina	0	4
(France) É Loit	1	2
(Russia) E Vesnina	6	6
24	(Ukraine) A Bondarenko	6	6
Q	(Hungary) Á Szávay	2	3
(Italy) R Vinci	6	3	2
15	(Switzerland) P Schnyder	2	6	6

Third round
1	(Belgium) J Henin	6	6
(Russia) E Vesnina	1	3
24	(Ukraine) A Bondarenko	4	6	6
15	(Switzerland) P Schnyder	6	3	8

Fourth round
1	(Belgium) J Henin	6	6
15	(Switzerland) P Schnyder	2	2

==== Section 2 ====
First round
10	(Slovakia) D Hantuchová	6	6
WC	(Russia) A Pavlyuchenkova	0	1
(Russia) E Likhovtseva	3	6	7
(Italy) ME Camerin	6	1	5
Q	(Croatia) N Ožegović	6	6
(Germany) A-L Grönefeld	3	2
WC	(United Kingdom) E Baltacha	6^{4}	6	2
19	(Slovenia) K Srebotnik	7^{7}	3	6
27	(Australia) S Stosur	4	6	6
Q	(Puerto Rico) K Brandi	6	2	2
(Venezuela) M Sequera	6	6
(Germany) J Schruff	3	2
(Australia) A Molik	6	6
(Russia) A Rodionova	3	2
(Spain) L Domínguez Lino	5	0
7	(United States) S Williams	7	6

Second round
10	(Slovakia) D Hantuchová	7	7^{7}
(Russia) E Likhovtseva	5	6^{3}
Q	(Croatia) N Ožegović	1	1
19	(Slovenia) K Srebotnik	6	6
27	(Australia) S Stosur	2	7	4
(Venezuela) M Sequera	6	5	6
(Australia) A Molik	6^{4}	3
7	(United States) S Williams	7^{7}	6

Third round
10	(Slovakia) D Hantuchová	2	6	6
19	(Slovenia) K Srebotnik	6	3	4
(Venezuela) M Sequera	1	0
7	(United States) S Williams	6	6

Fourth round
10	(Slovakia) D Hantuchová	2	7^{7}	2
7	(United States) S Williams	6	6^{2}	6

==== Section 3 ====
First round
3	(Serbia) J Janković	6	6
WC	(United Kingdom) A Keothavong	2	0
(United States) M Shaughnessy	2	4
(Slovakia) J Gajdošová	6	6
(Argentina) G Dulko	7	3	6
(Greece) E Daniilidou	5	6	8
(Czech Republic) Z Ondrášková	5	2
25	(Czech Republic) L Šafářová	7	6
18	(France) M Bartoli	6	6
(Italy) F Pennetta	3	1
Q	(Belarus) O Govortsova	6^{5}	7^{7}	6
(Germany) G Arn	7^{7}	6^{4}	1
(Estonia) K Kanepi	6	6
(Germany) T Malek	1	4
(Thailand) T Tanasugarn	5	2
16	(Israel) S Pe'er	7	6

Second round
3	(Serbia) J Janković	6	6
(Slovakia) J Gajdošová	1	1
(Greece) E Daniilidou	4	6	3
25	(Czech Republic) L Šafářová	6	3	6
18	(France) M Bartoli	7	6
Q	(Belarus) O Govortsova	5	2
(Estonia) K Kanepi	4	5
16	(Israel) S Pe'er	6	7

Third round
3	(Serbia) J Janković	5	7^{7}	6
25	(Czech Republic) L Šafářová	7	6^{4}	2
18	(France) M Bartoli	6	6
16	(Israel) S Pe'er	3	2

Fourth round
3	(Serbia) J Janković	6	5	3
18	(France) M Bartoli	3	7	6

==== Section 4 ====
First round
9	(Switzerland) M Hingis	6^{1}	7	6
WC	(United Kingdom) N Cavaday	7^{7}	5	0
(Japan) A Nakamura	7	6
(Slovakia) M Suchá	5	2
(Canada) A Wozniak	6^{4}	3
(United States) L Granville	7^{7}	6
(Uzbekistan) V Lepchenko	2	2
20	(Austria) S Bammer	6	6
31	(Netherlands) M Krajicek	6	6^{6}	6
(Israel) T Obziler	2	7^{8}	1
(Germany) S Klösel	3	5
WC	(United Kingdom) K O'Brien	6	7
WC	(Ukraine) V Kutuzova	4	2
(Belarus) T Poutchek	6	6
(Germany) A Kerber	5	3
8	(Russia) A Chakvetadze	7	6

Second round
9	(Switzerland) M Hingis	6	6
(Japan) A Nakamura	1	2
(United States) L Granville	6	6
20	(Austria) S Bammer	1	4
31	(Netherlands) M Krajicek	6	6
WC	(United Kingdom) K O'Brien	0	1
(Belarus) T Poutchek	2	1
8	(Russia) A Chakvetadze	6	6

Third round
9	(Switzerland) M Hingis	4	2
(United States) L Granville	6	6
31	(Netherlands) M Krajicek	7^{10}	6^{5}	6
8	(Russia) A Chakvetadze	6^{8}	7^{7}	2

Fourth round
(United States) L Granville	3	4
31	(Netherlands) M Krajicek	6	6

=== Bottom half ===
==== Section 5 ====
First round
6	(Serbia) A Ivanovic	6	7^{7}
(Hungary) M Czink	0	6^{3}
(Romania) E Gallovits	6	2	2
(United States) M Tu	4	6	6
(United States) S Perry	2	6^{4}
(France) A Rezaï	6	7^{7}
(Luxembourg) A Kremer	7	4	3
29	(Italy) F Schiavone	5	6	6
22	(Spain) A Medina Garrigues	3	6	2
(Spain) V Ruano Pascual	6	2	6
Q	(Ukraine) T Perebiynis	6	6
(Switzerland) E Gagliardi	3	3
(India) S Mirza	6	6
(Russia) Y Shvedova	0	3
(United States) V King	0	1
11	(Russia) N Petrova	6	6

Second round
6	(Serbia) A Ivanovic	6	6
(United States) M Tu	4	3
(France) A Rezaï	6	2	6
29	(Italy) F Schiavone	4	6	4
(Spain) V Ruano Pascual	7	6
Q	(Ukraine) T Perebiynis	5	2
(India) S Mirza	2	2
11	(Russia) N Petrova	6	6

Third round
6	(Serbia) A Ivanovic	6	6
(France) A Rezaï	3	2
(Spain) V Ruano Pascual	3	6^{3}
11	(Russia) N Petrova	6	7^{7}

Fourth round
6	(Serbia) A Ivanovic	6	2	6
11	(Russia) N Petrova	1	6	4

==== Section 6 ====
First round
14	(Czech Republic) N Vaidišová	7^{8}	6
(Italy) K Knapp	6^{6}	2
(Australia) N Pratt	6	6
Q	(Australia) C Dellacqua	3	4
(Belarus) V Azarenka	6	6
(Croatia) J Kostanić Tošić	3	1
Q	(China) Z Yan	6	2	3
21	(Italy) T Garbin	3	6	6
28	(Italy) M Santangelo	6	3	6
Q	(Japan) A Morita	1	6	3
WC	(Denmark) C Wozniacki	7	6
(Belarus) A Yakimova	5	2
(France) V Razzano	4	5
(Austria) Y Meusburger	6	7
(United States) J Jackson	1	3
4	(France) A Mauresmo	6	6

Second round
14	(Czech Republic) N Vaidišová	6	6
(Australia) N Pratt	3	2
(Belarus) V Azarenka	6	6
21	(Italy) T Garbin	1	3
28	(Italy) M Santangelo	6	7^{7}
WC	(Denmark) C Wozniacki	0	6^{4}
(Austria) Y Meusburger	1	2
4	(France) A Mauresmo	6	6

Third round
14	(Czech Republic) N Vaidišová	6	6
(Belarus) V Azarenka	4	2
28	(Italy) M Santangelo	1	2
4	(France) A Mauresmo	6	6

Fourth round
14	(Czech Republic) N Vaidišová	7^{8}	4	6
4	(France) A Mauresmo	6^{6}	6	1

==== Section 7 ====
First round
5	(Russia) S Kuznetsova	4	6	6
(Ukraine) J Vakulenko	6	4	3
(United States) B Mattek	6	6
(Russia) V Bardina	1	0
(Bulgaria) T Pironkova	2	1
(Poland) A Radwańska	6	6
(Israel) A Smashnova	0	0
32	(Germany) M Müller	6	6
17	(France) T Golovin	5	6	8
Q	(Chinese Taipei) S-w Hsieh	7	3	6
Q	(Czech Republic) B Záhlavová-Strýcová	4	6^{3}
(Austria) T Paszek	6	7^{7}
(Colombia) C Castaño	0	5
(Czech Republic) I Benešová	6	7
(France) N Dechy	2	6^{7}
12	(Russia) E Dementieva	6	7^{9}

Second round
5	(Russia) S Kuznetsova	7^{7}	6
(United States) B Mattek	6^{2}	4
(Poland) A Radwańska	6	4
32	(Germany) M Müller	1	0^{r}
17	(France) T Golovin	2	6	1
(Austria) T Paszek	6	3	6
(Czech Republic) I Benešová	2	2
12	(Russia) E Dementieva	6	6

Third round
5	(Russia) S Kuznetsova	6	6
(Poland) A Radwańska	2	3
(Austria) T Paszek	3	6	6
12	(Russia) E Dementieva	6	2	3

Fourth round
5	(Russia) S Kuznetsova	6	6
(Austria) T Paszek	3	2

==== Section 8 ====
First round
13	(Russia) D Safina	7	7^{9}
(Ukraine) K Bondarenko	5	6^{7}
(Italy) A Brianti	4	0
(Japan) A Morigami	6	6
(China) S Peng	4	4
Q	(Czech Republic) H Šromová	6	6
(Russia) A Kudryavtseva	6	3	5
23	(United States) V Williams	2	6	7
26	(Japan) A Sugiyama	6	6
WC	(United Kingdom) M South	3	2
(Russia) M Kirilenko	4	4
LL	(France) A Cornet	6	6
(France) S Brémond	6	6
(Russia) E Bychkova	4	4
(Chinese Taipei) Y-j Chan	1	5
2	(Russia) M Sharapova	6	7

Second round
13	(Russia) D Safina	4	5
(Japan) A Morigami	6	7
Q	(Czech Republic) H Šromová	2	2
23	(United States) V Williams	6	6
26	(Japan) A Sugiyama	4	6	6
LL	(France) A Cornet	6	0	3
(France) S Brémond	0	3
2	(Russia) M Sharapova	6	6

Third round
(Japan) A Morigami	2	6	5
23	(United States) V Williams	6	3	7
26	(Japan) A Sugiyama	3	3
2	(Russia) M Sharapova	6	6

Fourth round
23	(United States) V Williams	6	6
2	(Russia) M Sharapova	1	3

== Championship match statistics ==
Category	(United States) V. Williams	(France) Bartoli
1st serve %	35/50 (70%)	40/63 (63%)
1st serve points won	27 of 35 = 77%	24 of 40 = 60%
2nd serve points won	7 of 15 = 47%	9 of 23 = 39%
Total service points won	34 of 50 = 68.00%	33 of 63 = 52.38%
Aces	1	0
Double faults	2	5
Winners	29	7
Unforced errors	12	9
Net points won	17 of 25 = 68%	3 of 5 = 60%
Break points converted	4 of 10 = 40%	1 of 2 = 50%
Return points won	30 of 63 = 48%	16 of 50 = 32%
Total points won	64	49

Preceded by 2007 French Open – Women's singles	Grand Slam women's singles	Succeeded by 2007 US Open – Women's singles
