= 2007 Wimbledon Championships – Boys' singles =

Boys' singles
- 2007 Wimbledon Championships

Final
- Champion: (United States) Donald Young
- Runner-up: (Belarus) Uladzimir Ignatik
- Score: 7–5, 6–1

Details
- Draw: 64 (8 Q / 8 WC )
- Seeds: 16

Events
| Singles | men | women | | boys | girls |
| Doubles | men | women | mixed | boys | girls |
| WC Singles | men | women | quad |
| WC Doubles | men | women | quad |
| Legends | men | women | seniors |
| ← 2006 · | Wimbledon Championships | · 2008 → |

Donald Young defeated Uladzimir Ignatik in the final, 7–5, 6–1 to win the boys' singles tennis title at the 2007 Wimbledon Championships.

Thiemo de Bakker was the defending champion, but was no longer eligible to compete in junior events.

== Seeds ==
1. (Belarus) Uladzimir Ignatik (final)
2. (Italy) Matteo Trevisan (quarterfinals)
3. (United States) Donald Young (champion)
4. (Brazil) Fernando Romboli (first round)
5. (France) Jonathan Eysseric (third round)
6. (Australia) Greg Jones (semifinals)
7. (France) Stéphane Piro (first round)
8. (United States) Kellen Damico (third round)
9. (Australia) Brydan Klein (quarterfinals)
10. (Slovakia) Martin Kližan (first round)
11. (Czech Republic) Roman Jebavý (first round)
12. (Australia) John-Patrick Smith (second round)
13. (Australia) Stephen Donald (first round)
14. (Chile) Ricardo Urzúa-Rivera (third round)
15. (Italy) Thomas Fabbiano (third round)
16. (Chile) Guillermo Rivera-Aránguiz (first round)

Click on the seed number of a player to go to their draw section.

== Draw ==
=== Key ===
- Q = Qualifier
- WC = Wild card
- LL = Lucky loser
- Alt = Alternate
- ITF = ITF entry
- PR = Protected ranking
- SR = Special ranking
- SE = Special exempt
- JE = Junior exempt
- JR = Junior Accelerator Programme entrant
- CO = College Accelerator Programme entrant
- NG = Next Gen Accelerator Program entrant
- w/o = Walkover
- r = Retired
- d = Defaulted

=== Finals ===
Quarterfinals
1 | (Belarus) Uladzimir Ignatik | 6 | 1 | [10]
(Portugal) Gastão Elias | 3 | 6 | 3
(Lithuania) Ričardas Berankis | 6 | 6
9 | (Australia) Brydan Klein | 2 | 2
Q | (Germany) Dimitris Kleftakos | 6 | 1 | [8]
3 | (United States) Donald Young | 3 | 6 | [10]
6 | (Australia) Greg Jones | 7^{9} | 6
2 | (Italy) Matteo Trevisan | 6^{7} | 2

Semifinals
1 | (Belarus) Uladzimir Ignatik | 7 | 3 | 6
(Lithuania) Ričardas Berankis | 5 | 6 | 1
3 | (United States) Donald Young | 6 | 7
6 | (Australia) Greg Jones | 4 | 5

Final
1 | (Belarus) Uladzimir Ignatik | 5 | 1
3 | (United States) Donald Young | 7 | 6

=== Top half ===
==== Section 1 ====
First round
1 | (Belarus) Uladzimir Ignatik | 6 | 6
(Netherlands) Thomas Schoorel | 3 | 1
(United States) Mateusz Kecki | 6 | 7^{8}
Q | (Bulgaria) Valentin Dimov | 2 | 6^{6}
(United Kingdom) David Rice | 6 | 7
(Venezuela) Roberto Maytín | 4 | 5
Q | (United Kingdom) Niall Angus | 3 | 1
15 | (Italy) Thomas Fabbiano | 6 | 6
12 | (Australia) John-Patrick Smith | 6 | 6
(Thailand) Kittipong Wachiramanowong | 2 | 0
WC | (United Kingdom) Marcus Willis | 7 | 2 | [10]
(Chinese Taipei) Peng Hsien-yin | 5 | 6 | [6]
(Portugal) Gastão Elias | 6 | 6
Q | (Poland) Mateusz Szmigiel | 3 | 4
(Russia) Danila Arsenov | 6 | 6
7 | (France) Stéphane Piro | 3 | 2

Second round
1 | (Belarus) U Ignatik | 6 | 6
(United States) M Kecki | 2 | 2
(United Kingdom) D Rice | 2 | 2
15 | (Italy) T Fabbiano | 6 | 6
12 | (Australia) J-P Smith | 4 | 6^{6}
WC | (United Kingdom) M Willis | 6 | 7^{8}
(Portugal) G Elias | 7^{7} | 6
(Russia) D Arsenov | 6^{3} | 1

Third round
1 | (Belarus) U Ignatik | 5 | 6 | [10]
15 | (Italy) T Fabbiano | 7 | 3 | [8]
WC | (United Kingdom) M Willis | 6^{5} | 6^{6}
(Portugal) G Elias | 7^{7} | 7^{8}

Quarterfinals
1 | (Belarus) U Ignatik | 6 | 1 | [10]
(Portugal) G Elias | 3 | 6 | [3]

==== Section 2 ====
First round
4 | (Brazil) Fernando Romboli | 4 | 3
(Lithuania) Ričardas Berankis | 6 | 6
(Madagascar) Lofo Ramiaramanana | 7^{7} | 6
(South Korea) Cho Soong-jae | 6^{4} | 3
WC | (United Kingdom) Graeme Dyce | 7 | 6
(Italy) Daniel Alejandro López | 5 | 4
(Slovenia) Janez Semrajc | 7^{7} | 6
16 | (Chile) Guillermo Rivera Aránguiz | 6^{2} | 3
9 | (Australia) Brydan Klein | 6 | 6
(Ecuador) Patricio Alvarado | 3 | 2
Q | (Slovakia) Andrej Martin | 2 | 6 | [9]
WC | (United Kingdom) Joshua Milton | 6 | 1 | [11]
WC | (United Kingdom) Sean Thornley | 7 | 6^{4} | [7]
(India) Rupesh Roy | 5 | 7^{7} | [10]
(South Africa) Damian Hume | 3 | 2
8/WC | (United States) Kellen Damico | 6 | 6

Second round
(Lithuania) R Berankis | 6 | 6
(Madagascar) L Ramiaramanana | 1 | 2
WC | (United Kingdom) G Dyce | 7 | 6
(Slovenia) J Semrajc | 5 | 4
9 | (Australia) B Klein | 6 | 3 | [10]
WC | (United Kingdom) J Milton | 1 | 6 | [5]
(India) R Roy | 3 | 6 | [6]
8/WC | (United States) K Damico | 6 | 3 | [10]

Third round
(Lithuania) R Berankis | 7^{7} | 6
WC | (United Kingdom) G Dyce | 6^{0} | 2
9 | (Australia) B Klein | 1 | 6 | [10]
8/WC | (United States) K Damico | 6 | 3 | [7]

Quarterfinals
(Lithuania) R Berankis | 6 | 6
9 | (Australia) B Klein | 2 | 2

=== Bottom half ===
==== Section 3 ====
First round
5 | (France) Jonathan Eysseric | 6 | 6
(Australia) Andrew Thomas | 4 | 1
(United Kingdom) Daniel Cox | 7 | 6
(Mexico) César Ramírez | 5 | 1
(United States) Austin Krajicek | 7^{8} | 3 | [9]
WC | (United Kingdom) Daniel Smethurst | 6^{6} | 6 | [11]
Q | (Germany) Dimitris Kleftakos | 6 | 3 | [10]
10 | (Slovakia) Martin Kližan | 4 | 6 | [7]
13 | (Australia) Stephen Donald | 2 | 3
(Indonesia) Christopher Rungkat | 6 | 6
(Moldova) Radu Albot | 7^{7} | 7^{10}
(Thailand) Peerakiat Siriluethaiwattana | 6^{0} | 6^{8}
(Russia) Evgeny Donskoy | 3 | 6 | [6]
Q | (Belarus) Andrei Karatchenia | 6 | 0 | [10]
WC | (United Kingdom) Neil Pauffley | 2 | 3
3 | (United States) Donald Young | 6 | 6

Second round
5 | (France) J Eysseric | 6 | 6
(United Kingdom) D Cox | 3 | 4
WC | (United Kingdom) D Smethurst | 4 | 1
Q | (Germany) D Kleftakos | 6 | 6
(Indonesia) C Rungkat | 6 | 7^{11}
(Moldova) R Albot | 0 | 6^{9}
Q | (Belarus) A Karatchenia | 7^{8} | 1 | [4]
3 | (United States) D Young | 6^{6} | 6 | [10]

Third round
5 | (France) J Eysseric | 4 | 6 | [9]
Q | (Germany) D Kleftakos | 6 | 2 | [11]
(Indonesia) C Rungkat | 1 | 1
3 | (United States) D Young | 6 | 6

Quarterfinals
Q | (Germany) D Kleftakos | 6 | 1 | [8]
3 | (United States) D Young | 3 | 6 | [10]

==== Section 4 ====
First round
6 | (Australia) Greg Jones | 6 | 6
(Belgium) Frédéric de Fays | 4 | 3
WC | (United Kingdom) Mathew James | 4 | 6 | [10]
(Brazil) Henrique Cunha | 6 | 2 | [5]
Q | (United States) Ty Trombetta | 6 | 2 | [6]
(Netherlands) Tim van Terheijden | 4 | 6 | [10]
(Colombia) Alejandro González | 6 | 6
11 | (Czech Republic) Roman Jebavý | 1 | 4
14 | (Chile) Ricardo Urzúa-Rivera | 6 | 6
(North Macedonia) Ilija Martinoski | 1 | 3
(United States) Johnny Hamui | 2 | 5
(Romania) Dragoș Cristian Mirtea | 6 | 7
(United Kingdom) Dan Evans | 6 | 6^{6} | [8]
Q | (Australia) Mark Verryth | 2 | 7^{8} | [10]
(Slovenia) Aljaž Bedene | 2 | 6 | [0]
2 | (Italy) Matteo Trevisan | 6 | 4 | [10]

Second round
6 | (Australia) G Jones | 6 | 6
WC | (United Kingdom) M James | 2 | 1
(Netherlands) T van Terheijden | 1 | 7^{7} | [10]
(Colombia) A González | 6 | 6^{5} | [3]
14 | (Chile) R Urzúa-Rivera | 6 | 6
(Romania) DC Mirtea | 1 | 3
Q | (Australia) M Verryth | 5 | 2
2 | (Italy) M Trevisan | 7 | 6

Third round
6 | (Australia) G Jones | 6 | 6
(Netherlands) T van Terheijden | 1 | 2
14 | (Chile) R Urzúa-Rivera | 6 | 3 | [3]
2 | (Italy) M Trevisan | 2 | 6 | [10]

Quarterfinals
6 | (Australia) G Jones | 7^{9} | 6
2 | (Italy) M Trevisan | 6^{7} | 2
