= 2007 Wimbledon Championships – Girls' singles =

Girls' singles
- 2007 Wimbledon Championships

Final
- Champion: (Poland) Urszula Radwańska
- Runner-up: (United States) Madison Brengle
- Score: 2–6, 6–3, 6–0

Details
- Draw: 64 (8 Q / 8 WC )
- Seeds: 16

Events
Singles	men	women		boys	girls
Doubles	men	women	mixed	boys	girls
WC Singles	men	women	quad
WC Doubles	men	women	quad
Legends	men	women	seniors
← 2006 ·	Wimbledon Championships	· 2008 →

Caroline Wozniacki was the defending champion but did not complete in the Juniors this year.

Urszula Radwańska defeated Madison Brengle in the final, 2–6, 6–3, 6–0 to win the girls' singles tennis title at the 2007 Wimbledon Championships.

== Seeds ==
1. (Russia) Anastasia Pavlyuchenkova (quarterfinals)
2. (Russia) Anastasia Pivovarova (third round)
3. (Russia) Evgeniya Rodina (quarterfinals)
4. (Belarus) Ksenia Milevskaya (second round)
5. (Austria) Nikola Hofmanova (second round)
6. (Poland) Urszula Radwańska (champion)
7. (United States) Madison Brengle (final)
8. (Czech Republic) Petra Kvitová (third round)
9. (United Kingdom) Naomi Cavaday (second round)
10. (Russia) Ksenia Pervak (second round)
11. (Chinese Taipei) Chang Kai-chen (second round)
12. (Israel) Julia Glushko (first round)
13. (Russia) Ksenia Lykina (third round)
14. (United States) Reka Zsilinszka (third round)
15. (Serbia) Bojana Jovanovski (quarterfinals)
16. (Colombia) Mariana Duque Mariño (second round)

Click on the seed number of a player to go to their draw section.

== Draw ==
=== Key ===
- Q = Qualifier
- WC = Wild card
- LL = Lucky loser
- Alt = Alternate
- SE = Special exempt
- PR = Protected ranking
- ITF = ITF entry
- JE = Junior exempt
- w/o = Walkover
- r = Retired
- d = Defaulted
- SR = Special ranking

=== Finals ===
Quarterfinals
1	(Russia) Anastasia Pavlyuchenkova	5	1
6	(Poland) Urszula Radwańska	7	6
WC	(United Kingdom) Anna Fitzpatrick	6	7
(United States) Gail Brodsky	2	5
(Poland) Katarzyna Piter	6	6
3	(Russia) Evgeniya Rodina	3	1
7	(United States) Madison Brengle	5	6	[10]
15	(Serbia) Bojana Jovanovski	7	3	[5]

Semifinals
6	(Poland) Urszula Radwańska	7^{7}	6
WC	(United Kingdom) Anna Fitzpatrick	6^{3}	3
(Poland) Katarzyna Piter	5	6^{3}
7	(United States) Madison Brengle	7	7^{7}

Final
6	(Poland) Urszula Radwańska	2	6	6
7	(United States) Madison Brengle	6	3	0

=== Top half ===
==== Section 1 ====
First round
1	(Russia) Anastasia Pavlyuchenkova	4	7	[10]
(Portugal) Michelle Larcher de Brito	6	5	[5]
(Romania) Irina-Camelia Begu	1	0
(Netherlands) Arantxa Rus	6	6
(Argentina) Tatiana Búa	1	6	[10]
(Australia) Jessica Moore	6	3	[8]
Q	(United Kingdom) Jessica Jackson	4	2
14	(United States) Reka Zsilinszka	6	6
9	(United Kingdom) Naomi Cavaday	6	6
(Croatia) Jasmina Tinjić	2	1
(Georgia (country)) Oksana Kalashnikova	6	6
(Russia) Arina Rodionova	1	4
Q	(United States) Julia Boserup	4	5
(Slovakia) Kristína Kučová	6	7
(Belgium) Tamaryn Hendler	1	1
6	(Poland) Urszula Radwańska	6	6

Second round
1	(Russia) A Pavlyuchenkova	6	6
(Netherlands) A Rus	4	1
(Argentina) T Búa	4	6	[3]
14	(United States) R Zsilinszka	6	4	[10]
9	(United Kingdom) N Cavaday	3	4
(Georgia (country)) O Kalashnikova	6	6
(Slovakia) K Kučová	2	2
6	(Poland) U Radwańska	6	6

Third round
1	(Russia) A Pavlyuchenkova	6	6
14	(United States) R Zsilinszka	3	2
(Georgia (country)) O Kalashnikova	5	1
6	(Poland) U Radwańska	7	6

Quarterfinals
1	(Russia) A Pavlyuchenkova	5	1
6	(Poland) U Radwańska	7	6

==== Section 2 ====
First round
4	(Belarus) Ksenia Milevskaya	6	5	[10]
(China) Zhou Yimiao	3	7	[2]
(United States) Melanie Oudin	5	4
WC	(United Kingdom) Anna Fitzpatrick	7	6
(Japan) Kurumi Nara	6	6
Q	(Australia) Sally Peers	3	1
(France) Nelly Ciolkowski	2	4
13	(Russia) Ksenia Lykina	6	6
10	(Russia) Ksenia Pervak	6	6
(Thailand) Noppawan Lertcheewakarn	2	2
WC	(United Kingdom) Tara Moore	4	2
(United States) Gail Brodsky	6	6
(Germany) Syna Kayser	3	2
(Czech Republic) Kateřina Vaňková	6	6
(South Africa) Monica Gorny	3	1
5	(Austria) Nikola Hofmanova	6	6

Second round
4	(Belarus) K Milevskaya	4	4
WC	(United Kingdom) A Fitzpatrick	6	6
(Japan) K Nara	5	6	[9]
13	(Russia) K Lykina	7	4	[11]
10	(Russia) K Pervak	4	7	[6]
(United States) G Brodsky	6	5	[10]
(Czech Republic) K Vaňková	6	6^{4}	[10]
5	(Austria) N Hofmanova	1	7^{7}	[6]

Third round
WC	(United Kingdom) A Fitzpatrick	6	0	[10]
13	(Russia) K Lykina	2	6	[8]
(United States) G Brodsky	4	7	[12]
(Czech Republic) K Vaňková	6	5	[10]

Quarterfinals
WC	(United Kingdom) A Fitzpatrick	6	7
(United States) G Brodsky	2	5

=== Bottom half ===
==== Section 3 ====
First round
8	(Czech Republic) Petra Kvitová	6	6
WC	(United Kingdom) Jocelyn Rae	4	2
(Argentina) Malena Gordo	6	2	[10]
(Russia) Elena Chernyakova	3	6	[5]
Q	(United States) Kristy Frilling	0	1
(Poland) Katarzyna Piter	6	6
(Japan) Misaki Doi	6^{1}	6	[10]
12	(Israel) Julia Glushko	7^{7}	4	[7]
16/WC	(Colombia) Mariana Duque Mariño	6	6
(Slovakia) Romana Tabaková	3	1
(Romania) Simona Halep	6	6
(United States) Mallory Cecil	2	1
(Australia) Tyra Calderwood	1	6	[6]
WC	(United Kingdom) Jade Windley	6	3	[10]
(Croatia) Petra Martić	1	3
3	(Russia) Evgeniya Rodina	6	6

Second round
8	(Czech Republic) P Kvitová	6	6
(Argentina) M Gordo	2	1
(Poland) K Piter	6	6
(Japan) M Doi	2	2
16/WC	(Colombia) M Duque Mariño	5	5
(Romania) S Halep	7	7
WC	(United Kingdom) J Windley	2	3
3	(Russia) E Rodina	6	6

Third round
8	(Czech Republic) P Kvitová	6^{4}	2
(Poland) K Piter	7^{7}	6
(Romania) S Halep	4	7	[4]
3	(Russia) E Rodina	6	5	[10]

Quarterfinals
(Poland) K Piter	6	6
3	(Russia) E Rodina	3	1

==== Section 4 ====
First round
7	(United States) Madison Brengle	6	7
WC	(United Kingdom) Jade Curtis	1	5
(France) Cindy Chala	2	6	[11]
Q	(Sweden) Sandra Roma	6	2	[9]
(Japan) Shiho Akita	2	2
Q	(Australia) Alison Bai	6	6
Q	(Russia) Maria Mosolova	3	4
11	(Chinese Taipei) Chang Kai-chen	6	6
15	(Serbia) Bojana Jovanovski	3	6	[10]
LL	(Germany) Dominice Ripoll	6	3	[6]
Q	(Russia) Julia Gavenko	6^{2}	2
(United States) Veronica Li	7^{7}	6
(Slovakia) Lenka Juríková	6	6
(Czech Republic) Andrea Berková	4	2
WC	(United Kingdom) Naomi Broady	3	3
2/WC	(Russia) Anastasia Pivovarova	6	6

Second round
7	(United States) M Brengle	6	6^{3}	[10]
(France) C Chala	1	7^{7}	[5]
Q	(Australia) A Bai	7^{7}	7^{7}
11	(Chinese Taipei) K-c Chang	6^{3}	6^{3}
15	(Serbia) B Jovanovski	6	5	[10]
(United States) V Li	4	7	[5]
(Slovakia) L Juríková	1	2
2/WC	(Russia) A Pivovarova	6	6

Third round
7	(United States) M Brengle	6	7
Q	(Australia) A Bai	3	5
15	(Serbia) B Jovanovski	6	6
2/WC	(Russia) A Pivovarova	4	3

Quarterfinals
7	(United States) M Brengle	5	6	[10]
15	(Serbia) B Jovanovski	7	3	[5]
