= 2007 Wimbledon Championships – Girls' doubles =

Girls' doubles
- 2007 Wimbledon Championships

Final
- Champions: (Russia) Anastasia Pavlyuchenkova (Poland) Urszula Radwańska
- Runners-up: (Japan) Misaki Doi (Japan) Kurumi Nara
- Score: 6–4, 2–6, [10–7]

Events
Singles	men	women		boys	girls
Doubles	men	women	mixed	boys	girls
WC Singles	men	women	quad
WC Doubles	men	women	quad
Legends	men	women	seniors
← 2006 ·	Wimbledon Championships	· 2008 →

Alisa Kleybanova and Anastasia Pavlyuchenkova were the defending champions but Kleybanova did not compete in the Juniors this year.

Pavlyuchenkova and Urszula Radwańska defeated Misaki Doi and Kurumi Nara in the final, 6–4, 2–6, [10–7] to win the girls' doubles tennis title at the 2007 Wimbledon Championships.

== Seeds ==
1. (Russia) Anastasia Pavlyuchenkova / (Poland) Urszula Radwańska (champions)
2. (Belarus) Ksenia Milevskaya / (Russia) Ksenia Pervak (first round)
3. (Russia) Ksenia Lykina / (Russia) Anastasia Pivovarova (first round, withdrew)
4. (Romania) Irina-Camelia Begu / (Georgia (country)) Oksana Kalashnikova (semifinals)
5. (Israel) Julia Glushko / (Germany) Dominice Ripoll (first round, withdrew)
6. (Australia) Tyra Calderwood / (Russia) Elena Chernyakova (second round)
7. (Slovakia) Lenka Juríková / (Slovakia) Kristína Kučová (quarterfinals)
8. (Australia) Jessica Moore / (China) Zhou Yimiao (quarterfinals)

== Draw ==
=== Key ===
- Q = Qualifier
- WC = Wild card
- LL = Lucky loser
- Alt = Alternate
- SE = Special exempt
- PR = Protected ranking
- ITF = ITF entry
- JE = Junior exempt
- w/o = Walkover
- r = Retired
- d = Defaulted
- SR = Special ranking

=== Finals ===
Semifinals
1	(Russia) Anastasia Pavlyuchenkova (Poland) Urszula Radwańska	4	6	[10]
(Austria) Nikola Hofmanova (Sweden) Sandra Roma	6	4	[5]
4	(Romania) Irina-Camelia Begu (Georgia (country)) Oksana Kalashnikova	3	4
(Japan) Misaki Doi (Japan) Kurumi Nara	6	6

Final
1	(Russia) Anastasia Pavlyuchenkova (Poland) Urszula Radwańska	6	2	[10]
(Japan) Misaki Doi (Japan) Kurumi Nara	4	6	[7]

=== Top half ===
First round
1	(Russia) Anastasia Pavlyuchenkova (Poland) Urszula Radwańska	6	6
(Australia) Alison Bai (South Africa) Monica Gorny	4	3
WC	(United Kingdom) Stephanie Cornish (United Kingdom) Jocelyn Rae	4	4
(United States) Madison Brengle (United States) Chelsey Gullickson	6	6
(Czech Republic) Petra Kvitová (Czech Republic) Kateřina Vaňková	6	4	[6]
(Colombia) Mariana Duque Mariño (Portugal) Michelle Larcher de Brito	3	6	[10]
(Russia) Yana Buchina (Russia) Arina Rodionova
5	(Israel) Julia Glushko (Germany) Dominice Ripoll	w/o
3	(Russia) Ksenia Lykina (Russia) Anastasia Pivovarova	w/o
(Austria) Nikola Hofmanova (Sweden) Sandra Roma
WC	(United Kingdom) Naomi Broady (United Kingdom) Tara Moore	6	4	[10]
(United States) Mallory Cecil (United States) Kristy Frilling	3	6	[7]
(Serbia) Bojana Jovanovski (Germany) Syna Kayser	7^{7}	5	[1]
WC	(United Kingdom) Jade Curtis (United Kingdom) Anna Fitzpatrick	6^{2}	7	[10]
(United States) Gail Brodsky (Belgium) Tamaryn Hendler	2	6	[2]
6	(Australia) Tyra Calderwood (Russia) Elena Chernyakova	6	1	[10]

Second round
1	(Russia) A Pavlychenkova (Poland) U Radwańska	6	6
(United States) M Brengle (United States) C Gullickson	3	1
(Colombia) M Duque Mariño (Portugal) M Larcher de Brito
(Russia) Y Buchina (Russia) A Rodionova	w/o
(Austria) N Hofmanova (Sweden) S Roma	6	6
WC	(United Kingdom) N Broady (United Kingdom) T Moore	3	1
WC	(United Kingdom) J Curtis (United Kingdom) A Fitzpatrick	6	6
6	(Australia) T Calderwood (Russia) E Chernyakova	1	3

Quarterfinals
1	(Russia) A Pavlychenkova (Poland) U Radwańska	6	6
(Colombia) M Duque Mariño (Portugal) M Larcher de Brito	2	2
(Austria) N Hofmanova (Sweden) S Roma	7^{7}	6
WC	(United Kingdom) J Curtis (United Kingdom) A Fitzpatrick	6^{1}	2

Semifinals
1	(Russia) A Pavlyuchenkova (Poland) U Radwańska	4	6	[10]
(Austria) N Hofmanova (Sweden) S Roma	6	4	[5]

=== Bottom half ===
First round
8	(Australia) Jessica Moore (China) Zhou Yimiao	4	6	[11]
WC	(United Kingdom) Katharina Brown (United Kingdom) Jade Windley	6	2	[9]
(Russia) Julia Gavenko (Russia) Maria Mosolova	w/o
Alt	(United Kingdom) Jessica Jackson (Canada) Anne-Christine Voicu
(Japan) Shiho Akita (Australia) Sally Peers	4	4
(Argentina) Tatiana Búa (Argentina) Malena Gordo	6	6
(Romania) Simona Halep (Netherlands) Arantxa Rus	w/o
4	(Romania) Irina-Camelia Begu (Georgia (country)) Oksana Kalashnikova
7	(Slovakia) Lenka Juríková (Slovakia) Kristína Kučová	7^{7}	6
(Czech Republic) Andrea Berková (United States) Reka Zsilinszka	6^{2}	2
Alt	(Australia) Alenka Hubacek (Japan) Yuuki Tanaka	4	4
(Poland) Katarzyna Piter (Slovakia) Romana Tabaková	6	6
(France) Cindy Chala (France) Nelly Ciolkowski	4	6^{2}
(Japan) Misaki Doi (Japan) Kurumi Nara	6	7^{7}
(Chinese Taipei) Chang Kai-chen (United States) Veronica Li	6^{6}	6	[10]
2	(Belarus) Ksenia Milevskaya (Russia) Ksenia Pervak	7^{8}	0	[5]

Second round
8	(Australia) J Moore (China) Y Zhou	6	6
(United Kingdom) J Jackson (Canada) AC Voicu	1	3
(Argentina) T Búa (Argentina) M Gordo	3	3
4	(Romania) I-C Begu (Georgia (country)) O Kalashnikova	6	6
7	(Slovakia) L Juríková (Slovakia) K Kučová	3	7	[10]
(Poland) K Piter (Slovakia) R Tabaková	6	5	[6]
(Japan) M Doi (Japan) K Nara	7^{7}	6
(Chinese Taipei) K-c Chang (United States) V Li	6^{2}	2

Quarterfinals
8	(Australia) J Moore (China) Y Zhou	4	4
4	(Romania) I-C Begu (Georgia (country)) O Kalashnikova	6	6
7	(Slovakia) L Juríková (Slovakia) K Kučová	5	3
(Japan) M Doi (Japan) K Nara	7	6

Semifinals
4	(Romania) I-C Begu (Georgia (country)) O Kalashnikova	3	4
(Japan) M Doi (Japan) K Nara	6	6
