= 2007 Wimbledon Championships – Men's doubles =

Men's doubles
- 2007 Wimbledon Championships

Final
- Champions: (France) Arnaud Clément (France) Michaël Llodra
- Runners-up: (United States) Bob Bryan (United States) Mike Bryan
- Score: 6–7^{(5–7)}, 6–3, 6–4, 6–4

Details
- Draw: 64 (4 Q / 5 WC )
- Seeds: 16

Events
Singles	men	women		boys	girls
Doubles	men	women	mixed	boys	girls
WC Singles	men	women	quad
WC Doubles	men	women	quad
Legends	men	women	seniors
← 2006 ·	Wimbledon Championships	· 2008 →

Arnaud Clément and Michaël Llodra defeated the defending champions Bob and Mike Bryan in the final, 6–7^{(5–7)}, 6–3, 6–4, 6–4, to win the gentlemen's doubles title at the 2007 Wimbledon Championships The French duo won their first Grand Slam as a team, however this was Llodra's third, having won the Australian Open twice previously with Fabrice Santoro in 2003 and 2004.

== Seeds ==
1. (United States) Bob Bryan / (United States) Mike Bryan (final)
2. (Sweden) Jonas Björkman / (Belarus) Max Mirnyi (first round)
3. (The Bahamas) Mark Knowles / (Canada) Daniel Nestor (quarterfinals)
4. (France) Fabrice Santoro / (Serbia) Nenad Zimonjić (semifinals)
5. (Czech Republic) Martin Damm / (India) Leander Paes (quarterfinals)
6. (Australia) Paul Hanley / (Zimbabwe) Kevin Ullyett (second round)
7. (Israel) Jonathan Erlich / (Israel) Andy Ram (second round)
8. (Sweden) Simon Aspelin / (Austria) Julian Knowle (first round)
9. (Czech Republic) Lukáš Dlouhý / (Czech Republic) Pavel Vízner (quarterfinals)
10. (France) Arnaud Clément / (France) Michaël Llodra (champions)
11. (India) Mahesh Bhupathi / (Czech Republic) Radek Štěpánek (withdrew)
12. (Australia) Ashley Fisher / (United States) Tripp Phillips (first round)
13. (Czech Republic) Jaroslav Levinský / (Czech Republic) David Škoch (third round)
14. (South Africa) Jeff Coetzee / (Netherlands) Rogier Wassen (first round)
15. (Argentina) Martín García / (Argentina) Sebastián Prieto (second round)
16. (Poland) Mariusz Fyrstenberg / (Poland) Łukasz Kubot (second round)
17. (Switzerland) Yves Allegro / (United States) Jim Thomas (first round)

Click on the seed number of a player to go to their draw section.

== Draw ==
=== Key ===
- Q = Qualifier
- WC = Wild card
- LL = Lucky loser
- Alt = Alternate
- ITF = ITF entry
- PR = Protected ranking
- SR = Special ranking
- SE = Special exempt
- JE = Junior exempt
- JR = Junior Accelerator Programme entrant
- CO = College Accelerator Programme entrant
- NG = Next Gen Accelerator Program entrant
- w/o = Walkover
- r = Retired
- d = Defaulted

=== Finals ===
Quarterfinals
1	(United States) Bob Bryan (United States) Mike Bryan	6	6	6
9	(Czech Republic) Lukáš Dlouhý (Czech Republic) Pavel Vízner	3	2	4
4	(France) Fabrice Santoro (Serbia) Nenad Zimonjić	7^{8}	6^{5}	6	6
5	(Czech Republic) Martin Damm (India) Leander Paes	6^{6}	7^{7}	4	3
(Brazil) Marcelo Melo (Brazil) André Sá	6	6	6
3	(The Bahamas) Mark Knowles (Canada) Daniel Nestor	4	3	4
10	(France) Arnaud Clément (France) Michaël Llodra	6	6	6
Q	(Israel) Harel Levy (United States) Rajeev Ram	3	2	2

Semifinals
1	(United States) Bob Bryan (United States) Mike Bryan	7^{7}	6	7^{8}
4	(France) Fabrice Santoro (Serbia) Nenad Zimonjić	6^{4}	4	6^{6}
(Brazil) Marcelo Melo (Brazil) André Sá	6^{8}	3	3
10	(France) Arnaud Clément (France) Michaël Llodra	7^{10}	6	6

Final
1	(United States) Bob Bryan (United States) Mike Bryan	7^{7}	3	4	4
10	(France) Arnaud Clément (France) Michaël Llodra	6^{5}	6	6	6

=== Top half ===
==== Section 1 ====
First round
1	(United States) B Bryan (United States) M Bryan	6	6	6
(Spain) G García López (Spain) F Verdasco	1	3	3
(Belgium) O Rochus (Belgium) K Vliegen	7^{9}	6	6
LL	(Germany) L Burgsmüller (Ukraine) O Tereshchuk	6^{7}	4	2
LL	(Thailand) Sa Ratiwatana (Thailand) So Ratiwatana	6^{4}	4	4
WC	(United Kingdom) R Bloomfield (United Kingdom) J Marray	7^{7}	6	6
WC	(United Kingdom) J Baker (United Kingdom) A Bogdanovic	4	7^{7}	2	4
16	(Poland) M Fyrstenberg (Poland) Ł Kubot	6	6^{3}	6	6
9	(Czech Republic) L Dlouhý (Czech Republic) P Vízner	6	6	6
(Czech Republic) T Cibulec (Australia) J Kerr	4	4	2
(Czech Republic) F Čermák (Czech Republic) L Friedl	6	6^{7}	6	6
(South Korea) H-t Lee (Serbia) J Tipsarević	3	7^{9}	4	3
(Spain) Ó Hernández (Italy) P Starace	3	3	3
(United States) E Butorac (United Kingdom) J Murray	6	6	6
Q	(United States) A Kuznetsov (Germany) M Zverev	6^{2}	6	2	3
7	(Israel) J Erlich (Israel) A Ram	7^{7}	3	6	6

Second round
1	(United States) B Bryan (United States) M Bryan	6	7^{7}	6
(Belgium) O Rochus (Belgium) K Vliegen	0	6^{4}	1
WC	(United Kingdom) R Bloomfield (United Kingdom) J Marray	6	3	6	7
16	(Poland) M Fyrstenberg (Poland) Ł Kubot	3	6	4	5
9	(Czech Republic) L Dlouhý (Czech Republic) P Vízner	6	3	2	7^{7}	7
(Czech Republic) F Čermák (Czech Republic) L Friedl	4	6	6	6^{5}	5
(United States) E Butorac (United Kingdom) J Murray	3	6	6	6
7	(Israel) J Erlich (Israel) A Ram	6	4	3	4

Third round
1	(United States) B Bryan (United States) M Bryan	6	6	7^{7}
WC	(United Kingdom) R Bloomfield (United Kingdom) J Marray	2	2	6^{4}
9	(Czech Republic) L Dlouhý (Czech Republic) P Vízner	7^{7}	6	3	6
(United States) E Butorac (United Kingdom) J Murray	6^{5}	3	6	2

Quarterfinals
1	(United States) B Bryan (United States) M Bryan	6	6	6
9	(Czech Republic) L Dlouhý (Czech Republic) P Vízner	3	2	4

==== Section 2 ====
First round
4	(France) F Santoro (Serbia) N Zimonjić	6	6^{4}	7^{7}	7^{7}
WC	(United Kingdom) L Childs (United Kingdom) J Delgado	2	7^{7}	6^{4}	6^{5}
WC	(United Kingdom) N Bamford (United Kingdom) J May	6^{12}	3	2
(United States) R Ginepri (United States) T Parrott	7^{14}	6	6
LL	(United States) K Kim (Australia) R Smeets	6^{5}	7^{8}	6	7
(Latvia) E Gulbis (Croatia) I Ljubičić	7^{7}	6^{6}	4	5
(Spain) M Granollers (Spain) T Robredo	4	6^{4}	2
13	(Czech Republic) J Levinský (Czech Republic) D Škoch	6	7^{7}	6
12	(Australia) A Fisher (United States) T Phillips	6^{4}	2	5
(Germany) M Berrer (Germany) M Kohlmann	7^{7}	6	7
Q	(United States) S Lipsky (United States) D Martin	6	6	6
(Spain) A Montañés (Spain) R Ramírez Hidalgo	3	3	0
(United Kingdom) J Auckland (Australia) S Huss	4	6	7	7
Q	(Serbia) I Bozoljac (Belgium) D Norman	6	4	5	5
(South Africa) C Haggard (Poland) M Matkowski	6^{4}	3	5
5	(Czech Republic) M Damm (India) L Paes	7^{7}	6	7

Second round
4	(France) F Santoro (Serbia) N Zimonjić	6	6	6
(United States) R Ginepri (United States) T Parrott	1	4	2
(United States) K Kim (Australia) R Smeets	6^{2}	7	6^{4}	6^{8}
13	(Czech Republic) J Levinský (Czech Republic) D Škoch	7^{7}	5	7^{7}	7^{10}
(Germany) M Berrer (Germany) M Kohlmann	7^{7}	5	6^{5}	6^{9}
(United States) S Lipsky (United States) D Martin	6^{5}	7	7^{7}	7^{11}
(United Kingdom) J Auckland (Australia) S Huss	6^{4}	6^{4}	6	6^{3}
5	(Czech Republic) M Damm (India) L Paes	7^{7}	7^{7}	3	7^{7}

Third round
4	(France) F Santoro (Serbia) N Zimonjić	6	6	6
13	(Czech Republic) J Levinský (Czech Republic) D Škoch	1	2	4
(United States) S Lipsky (United States) D Martin	2	4	2
5	(Czech Republic) M Damm (India) L Paes	6	6	6

Quarterfinals
4	(France) F Santoro (Serbia) N Zimonjić	7^{8}	6^{5}	6	6
5	(Czech Republic) M Damm (India) L Paes	6^{6}	7^{7}	4	3

=== Bottom half ===
==== Section 3 ====
First round
6	(Australia) P Hanley (Zimbabwe) K Ullyett	6	6	6
(France) N Devilder (France) P-H Mathieu	1	3	3
(Brazil) M Melo (Brazil) A Sá	6^{4}	6	7^{8}	2	6
(France) J Benneteau (France) N Mahut	7^{7}	3	6^{6}	6	3
(Australia) W Arthurs (United States) J Gimelstob	6	6	6
(Italy) S Bolelli (Argentina) JM del Potro	4	3	2
(Germany) C Kas (Austria) A Peya	7^{7}	3	6	6
17	(Switzerland) Y Allegro (United States) J Thomas	6^{4}	6	4	4
14	(South Africa) J Coetzee (Netherlands) R Wassen	6	2	6^{5}	4
(South Africa) W Moodie (Australia) T Perry	2	6	7^{7}	6
(Germany) T Behrend (Germany) F Mayer	6	7^{7}	6
(Denmark) K Pless (Netherlands) M Verkerk	0	6^{1}	3
(France) M Gicquel (France) F Serra	3	7^{7}	6	6
(Russia) I Andreev (Russia) T Gabashvili	6	6^{4}	4	2
(Spain) N Almagro (Spain) I Navarro	6^{2}	3	1
3	(The Bahamas) M Knowles (Canada) D Nestor	7^{7}	6	6

Second round
6	(Australia) P Hanley (Zimbabwe) K Ullyett	7	6^{4}	6	6^{7}	26
(Brazil) M Melo (Brazil) A Sá	5	7^{7}	4	7^{9}	28
(Australia) W Arthurs (United States) J Gimelstob	2	4	5
(Germany) C Kas (Austria) A Peya	6	6	7
(South Africa) W Moodie (Australia) T Perry	6	6	3	6
(Germany) T Behrend (Germany) F Mayer	4	1	6	3
(France) M Gicquel (France) F Serra	6^{2}	4	6	0
3	(The Bahamas) M Knowles (Canada) D Nestor	7^{7}	6	4	6

Third round
(Brazil) M Melo (Brazil) A Sá	6	6^{6}	7^{7}	6^{9}	6
(Germany) C Kas (Austria) A Peya	4	7^{8}	6^{2}	7^{11}	4
(South Africa) W Moodie (Australia) T Perry	3	7	7	4	4
3	(The Bahamas) M Knowles (Canada) D Nestor	6	5	5	6	6

Quarterfinals
(Brazil) M Melo (Brazil) A Sá	6	6	6
3	(The Bahamas) M Knowles (Canada) D Nestor	4	3	4

==== Section 4 ====
First round
8	(Sweden) S Aspelin (Austria) J Knowle	4	7	4	4
(Sweden) T Johansson (Romania) A Pavel	6	5	6	6
(Russia) I Kunitsyn (Russia) D Tursunov	6	3	7^{8}	6
WC	(United Kingdom) J Goodall (United Kingdom) R Hutchins	2	6	6^{6}	4
(United States) A Delic (United States) B Reynolds	6	6^{3}	7	6
(Cyprus) M Baghdatis (Switzerland) S Wawrinka	3	7^{7}	5	4
(United States) M Russell (France) G Simon	2	1	3
10	(France) A Clément (France) M Llodra	6	6	6
15	(Argentina) M García (Argentina) S Prieto	6	4
(Argentina) A Calleri (Ecuador) N Lapentti	4	1^{r}
(Slovakia) D Hrbatý (Slovakia) M Mertiňák	4	4	4
Q	(Israel) H Levy (United States) R Ram	6	6	6
(Germany) B Becker (Czech Republic) P Pála	7^{7}	7^{8}	2	6
(Czech Republic) C Suk (Czech Republic) R Vik	6^{5}	6^{6}	6	3
(Sweden) R Lindstedt (Finland) J Nieminen	2	7^{7}	7	6
2	(Sweden) J Björkman (Belarus) M Mirnyi	6	6^{4}	5	3

Second round
(Sweden) T Johansson (Romania) A Pavel	7^{7}	1	6	6
(Russia) I Kunitsyn (Russia) D Tursunov	6^{3}	6	4	4
(United States) A Delic (United States) B Reynolds	3	4	7^{7}	7^{11}	12
10	(France) A Clément (France) M Llodra	6	6	6^{5}	6^{9}	14
15	(Argentina) M García (Argentina) S Prieto	6^{0}	7^{7}	6^{4}	7^{7}	8
Q	(Israel) H Levy (United States) R Ram	7^{7}	6^{4}	7^{7}	6^{3}	10
(Germany) B Becker (Czech Republic) P Pála	4	3	6	6	8
(Sweden) R Lindstedt (Finland) J Nieminen	6	6	4	4	6

Third round
(Sweden) T Johansson (Romania) A Pavel	5	3	0^{r}
10	(France) A Clément (France) M Llodra	7	6	1
Q	(Israel) H Levy (United States) R Ram	6	5	6	3	6
(Germany) B Becker (Czech Republic) P Pála	3	7	2	6	2

Quarterfinals
10	(France) A Clément (France) M Llodra	6	6	6
Q	(Israel) H Levy (United States) R Ram	3	2	2
