= 2007 Wimbledon Championships – Wheelchair men's doubles =

Wheelchair men's doubles
- 2007 Wimbledon Championships

Final
- Champions: (Netherlands) Robin Ammerlaan (Netherlands) Ronald Vink
- Runners-up: (Japan) Shingo Kunieda (Japan) Satoshi Saida
- Score: 4–6, 7–5, 6–2

Events
Singles	men	women		boys	girls
Doubles	men	women	mixed	boys	girls
WC Singles	men	women	quad
WC Doubles	men	women	quad
Legends	men	women	seniors
← 2006 ·	Wimbledon Championships	· 2008 →

Robin Ammerlaan and Ronald Vink defeated the defending champions Shingo Kunieda and Satoshi Saida in the final, 4–6, 7–5, 6–2 to win the gentlemen's doubles wheelchair tennis title at the 2007 Wimbledon Championships.

== Seeds ==
1. (Japan) Shingo Kunieda / (Japan) Satoshi Saida (final)
2. (Netherlands) Robin Ammerlaan / (Netherlands) Ronald Vink (champions)

== Draw ==
=== Key ===
- Q = Qualifier
- WC = Wild card
- LL = Lucky loser
- Alt = Alternate
- ITF = ITF entry
- PR = Protected ranking
- SR = Special ranking
- SE = Special exempt
- JE = Junior exempt
- JR = Junior Accelerator Programme entrant
- CO = College Accelerator Programme entrant
- NG = Next Gen Accelerator Program entrant
- w/o = Walkover
- r = Retired
- d = Defaulted

=== Finals ===
Semifinals
1	(Japan) Shingo Kunieda (Japan) Satoshi Saida	7^{8}	6
(Austria) Martin Legner (Netherlands) Maikel Scheffers	6^{6}	3
(Czech Republic) Miroslav Brychta (Poland) Tadeusz Kruszelnicki	3	4
2	(Netherlands) Robin Ammerlaan (Netherlands) Ronald Vink	6	6

Final
1	(Japan) Shingo Kunieda (Japan) Satoshi Saida	6	5	2
2	(Netherlands) Robin Ammerlaan (Netherlands) Ronald Vink	4	7	6
3rd place playoff
(Austria) Martin Legner (Netherlands) Maikel Scheffers	6	6
(Czech Republic) Miroslav Brychta (Poland) Tadeusz Kruszelnicki	3	2
