= 2007 Wimbledon Championships – Mixed doubles =

Mixed doubles
- 2007 Wimbledon Championships

Final
- Champions: (United Kingdom) Jamie Murray (Serbia) Jelena Janković
- Runners-up: (Sweden) Jonas Björkman (Australia) Alicia Molik
- Score: 6–4, 3–6, 6–1

Details
- Draw: 48 (5 WC )
- Seeds: 16

Events
Singles	men	women		boys	girls
Doubles	men	women	mixed	boys	girls
WC Singles	men	women	quad
WC Doubles	men	women	quad
Legends	men	women	seniors
← 2006 ·	Wimbledon Championships	· 2008 →

Jamie Murray and Jelena Janković defeated Jonas Björkman and Alicia Molik in the final, 6–4, 3–6, 6–1 to win the mixed doubles tennis title at the 2007 Wimbledon Championships. Murray became the first British champion of a senior Wimbledon title since Jeremy Bates and Jo Durie won the same title in 1987. This was the first and only major title won by Janković in her career, and she became the first Serbian woman to win a major title.

Andy Ram and Vera Zvonareva were the reigning champions, but Zvonareva did not compete. Ram partnered Nathalie Dechy, but lost in the third round to Marcin Matkowski and Cara Black.

== Seeds ==
All seeds received a bye into the second round.

1. (United States) Mike Bryan / (United States) Lisa Raymond (second round)
2. (United States) Bob Bryan / (Australia) Samantha Stosur (third round, withdrew)
3. (The Bahamas) Mark Knowles / (China) Yan Zi (second round)
4. (Zimbabwe) Kevin Ullyett / (South Africa) Liezel Huber (second round)
5. (Sweden) Jonas Björkman / (Australia) Alicia Molik (final)
6. (Sweden) Simon Aspelin / (Italy) Mara Santangelo (second round)
7. (Israel) Andy Ram / (France) Nathalie Dechy (third round)
8. (India) Leander Paes / (United States) Meghann Shaughnessy (quarterfinals)
9. (Poland) Marcin Matkowski / (Zimbabwe) Cara Black (quarterfinals)
10. (Czech Republic) Pavel Vízner / (Czech Republic) Květa Peschke (third round)
11. (Canada) Daniel Nestor / (Russia) Elena Likhovtseva (semifinals)
12. (Australia) Todd Perry / (Chinese Taipei) Chuang Chia-jung (third round)
13. (Netherlands) Rogier Wassen / (Chinese Taipei) Chan Yung-jan (third round)
14. (Austria) Julian Knowle / (China) Sun Tiantian (third round)
15. (Israel) Jonathan Erlich / (Russia) Elena Vesnina (second round)
16. (Australia) Paul Hanley / (Ukraine) Tatiana Perebiynis (third round)

Click on the seed number of a player to go to their draw section.

== Draw ==
=== Key ===
- Q = Qualifier
- WC = Wild card
- LL = Lucky loser
- Alt = Alternate
- ITF = ITF entry
- PR = Protected ranking
- SR = Special ranking
- SE = Special exempt
- JE = Junior exempt
- JR = Junior Accelerator Programme entrant
- CO = College Accelerator Programme entrant
- NG = Next Gen Accelerator Program entrant
- w/o = Walkover
- r = Retired
- d = Defaulted

=== Finals ===
Quarterfinals
WC	(United Kingdom) Alex Bogdanovic (United Kingdom) Melanie South	3	6^{4}
11	(Canada) Daniel Nestor (Russia) Elena Likhovtseva	6	7^{7}
(United Kingdom) Jamie Murray (Serbia) Jelena Janković	7^{7}	6^{4}	7
9	(Poland) Marcin Matkowski (Zimbabwe) Cara Black	6^{1}	7^{7}	5
5	(Sweden) Jonas Björkman (Australia) Alicia Molik	4	6	6
(Australia) Jordan Kerr (Ukraine) Kateryna Bondarenko	6	3	4
8	(India) Leander Paes (United States) Meghann Shaughnessy	6	3	4
(France) Fabrice Santoro (France) Séverine Brémond	2	6	6

Semifinals
11	(Canada) Daniel Nestor (Russia) Elena Likhovtseva	4	6	4
(United Kingdom) Jamie Murray (Serbia) Jelena Janković	6	4	6
5	(Sweden) Jonas Björkman (Australia) Alicia Molik	6	3	6
(France) Fabrice Santoro (France) Séverine Brémond	3	6	3

Final
(United Kingdom) Jamie Murray (Serbia) Jelena Janković	6	3	6
5	(Sweden) Jonas Björkman (Australia) Alicia Molik	4	6	1

=== Top half ===
==== Section 1 ====
First round
WC	(United Kingdom) A Bogdanovic (United Kingdom) M South	6	7^{7}
(Germany) B Becker (Germany) A Grönefeld	4	6^{0}
(Australia) A Fisher (Australia) B Stewart	3	1
(South Africa) J Coetzee (Croatia) J Kostanić Tošić	6	6
(United States) T Phillips (Czech Republic) V Uhlířová	1	4
(Argentina) S Prieto (Spain) A Medina Garrigues	6	6
(South Africa) W Moodie (Russia) V Dushevina	7^{7}	6
(Belarus) M Mirnyi (Belarus) V Azarenka	6^{3}	3

Second round
1	(United States) M Bryan (United States) L Raymond	4	6	3
WC	(United Kingdom) A Bogdanovic (United Kingdom) M South	6	3	6
(South Africa) J Coetzee (Croatia) J Kostanić Tošić	6	4	2
13	(Netherlands) R Wassen (Chinese Taipei) Y-j Chan	4	6	6
11	(Canada) D Nestor (Russia) E Likhovtseva	6	6
(Argentina) S Prieto (Spain) A Medina Garrigues	1	2
(South Africa) W Moodie (Russia) V Dushevina	6	7
6	(Sweden) S Aspelin (Italy) M Santangelo	3	5

Third round
WC	(United Kingdom) A Bogdanovic (United Kingdom) M South	6	6
13	(Netherlands) R Wassen (Chinese Taipei) Y-j Chan	4	3
11	(Canada) D Nestor (Russia) E Likhovtseva	6	3	13
(South Africa) W Moodie (Russia) V Dushevina	4	6	11

Quarterfinals
WC	(United Kingdom) A Bogdanovic (United Kingdom) M South	3	6^{4}
11	(Canada) D Nestor (Russia) E Likhovtseva	6	7^{7}

==== Section 2 ====
First round
(United Kingdom) J Murray (Serbia) J Janković	3	7^{7}	6
WC	(United Kingdom) R Bloomfield (United Kingdom) S Borwell	6	6^{4}	2
(Poland) M Fyrstenberg (Poland) A Radwańska	6	3	2
(Finland) J Nieminen (Finland) E Laine	3	6	6
(Czech Republic) D Škoch (Slovakia) J Husárová	3	4
(India) M Bhupathi (India) S Mirza	6	6
(Switzerland) Y Allegro (Greece) E Daniilidou	6	4	2
(Poland) Ł Kubot (Austria) S Bammer	3	6	6

Second round
3	(The Bahamas) M Knowles (China) Z Yan	6^{4}	7^{7}	3
(United Kingdom) J Murray (Serbia) J Janković	7^{7}	6^{5}	6
(Finland) J Nieminen (Finland) E Laine	6^{5}	3
14	(Austria) J Knowle (China) T Sun	7^{7}	6
9	(Poland) M Matkowski (Zimbabwe) C Black	6	6
(India) M Bhupathi (India) S Mirza	4	4
(Poland) Ł Kubot (Austria) S Bammer	4	4
7	(Israel) A Ram (France) N Dechy	6	6

Third round
(United Kingdom) J Murray (Serbia) J Janković	6	7^{7}
14	(Austria) J Knowle (China) T Sun	3	6^{1}
9	(Poland) M Matkowski (Zimbabwe) C Black	6	6
7	(Israel) A Ram (France) N Dechy	3	4

Quarterfinals
(United Kingdom) J Murray (Serbia) J Janković	7^{7}	6^{4}	7
9	(Poland) M Matkowski (Zimbabwe) C Black	6^{1}	7^{7}	5

=== Bottom half ===
==== Section 3 ====
First round
Alt	(United States) V Spadea (United States) V King	4	6	6
(Czech Republic) F Čermák (Italy) R Vinci	6	1	2
(Czech Republic) M Damm (Netherlands) M Krajicek	2	7^{9}	4
Alt	(Brazil) M Melo (Austria) T Paszek	6	6^{7}	6
(Czech Republic) L Friedl (Australia) R Stubbs	6	0
(United States) E Butorac (United States) C Morariu	2	0^{r}
(United States) J Thomas (United States) M Tu	6^{3}	2
(Australia) J Kerr (Ukraine) K Bondarenko	7^{7}	6

Second round
5	(Sweden) J Björkman (Australia) A Molik	1	6	6
Alt	(United States) V Spadea (United States) V King	6	4	4
Alt	(Brazil) M Melo (Austria) T Paszek	4	2
10	(Czech Republic) P Vízner (Czech Republic) K Peschke	6	6
16	(Australia) P Hanley (Ukraine) T Perebiynis	6	6
(Czech Republic) L Friedl (Australia) R Stubbs	4	4
(Australia) J Kerr (Ukraine) K Bondarenko	7^{7}	4	6
4	(Zimbabwe) K Ullyett (South Africa) L Huber	6^{0}	6	4

Third round
5	(Sweden) J Björkman (Australia) A Molik	6	6
10	(Czech Republic) P Vízner (Czech Republic) K Peschke	4	4
16	(Australia) P Hanley (Ukraine) T Perebiynis	6	4	4
(Australia) J Kerr (Ukraine) K Bondarenko	4	6	6

Quarterfinals
5	(Sweden) J Björkman (Australia) A Molik	4	6	6
(Australia) J Kerr (Ukraine) K Bondarenko	6	3	4

==== Section 4 ====
First round
(Czech Republic) J Levinský (Czech Republic) R Voráčová	6	3	11
(Germany) C Kas (Germany) M Müller	3	6	9
WC	(United Kingdom) L Childs (United Kingdom) K O'Brien	2	1
WC	(United Kingdom) J Auckland (United Kingdom) C Curran	6	6
WC	(United Kingdom) J Delgado (United Kingdom) A Keothavong	1	3
(France) F Santoro (France) S Brémond	6	6
(Serbia) N Zimonjić (Italy) F Pennetta	4	4
(Argentina) M García (Argentina) P Suárez	6	6

Second round
8	(India) L Paes (United States) M Shaughnessy	6	6
(Czech Republic) J Levinský (Czech Republic) R Voráčová	0	0
WC	(United Kingdom) J Auckland (United Kingdom) C Curran	5	2
12	(Australia) T Perry (Chinese Taipei) C-j Chuang	7	6
15	(Israel) J Erlich (Russia) E Vesnina	3	4
(France) F Santoro (France) S Brémond	6	6
(Argentina) M García (Argentina) P Suárez	1	4
2	(United States) B Bryan (Australia) S Stosur	6	6

Third round
8	(India) L Paes (United States) M Shaughnessy	7	7
12	(Australia) T Perry (Chinese Taipei) C-j Chuang	5	5
(France) F Santoro (France) S Brémond
2	(United States) B Bryan (Australia) S Stosur	w/o

Quarterfinals
8	(India) L Paes (United States) M Shaughnessy	6	3	4
(France) F Santoro (France) S Brémond	2	6	6
