= 2007 Wimbledon Championships – Women's doubles =

Women's doubles
- 2007 Wimbledon Championships

Final
- Champions: (Zimbabwe) Cara Black (South Africa) Liezel Huber
- Runners-up: (Slovenia) Katarina Srebotnik (Japan) Ai Sugiyama
- Score: 3–6, 6–3, 6–2

Details
- Draw: 64 (4 Q / 5 WC )
- Seeds: 16

Events
Singles	men	women		boys	girls
Doubles	men	women	mixed	boys	girls
WC Singles	men	women	quad
WC Doubles	men	women	quad
Legends	men	women	seniors
← 2006 ·	Wimbledon Championships	· 2008 →

Yan Zi and Zheng Jie were the defending champions but Zheng did not compete. Yan partnered with Peng Shuai but lost in the quarterfinals to Alicia Molik and Mara Santangelo.

Cara Black and Liezel Huber defeated Katarina Srebotnik and Ai Sugiyama in the final, 3–6, 6–3, 6–2 to win the ladies' doubles tennis title at the 2007 Wimbledon Championships.

== Seeds ==
1. (United States) Lisa Raymond / (Australia) Samantha Stosur (semifinals)
2. (Zimbabwe) Cara Black / (South Africa) Liezel Huber (champions)
3. (Chinese Taipei) Chan Yung-jan / (Chinese Taipei) Chuang Chia-jung (third round)
4. (Slovenia) Katarina Srebotnik / (Japan) Ai Sugiyama (final)
5. (Czech Republic) Květa Peschke / (Australia) Rennae Stubbs (quarterfinals)
6. (Australia) Alicia Molik / (Italy) Mara Santangelo (semifinals)
7. (Slovakia) Janette Husárová / (United States) Meghann Shaughnessy (third round)
8. (Spain) Anabel Medina Garrigues / (Spain) Virginia Ruano Pascual (third round)

9. (Italy) Tathiana Garbin / (Argentina) Paola Suárez (first round)
10. (Russia) Elena Likhovtseva / (China) Sun Tiantian (quarterfinals)
11. (Italy) Maria Elena Camerin / (Argentina) Gisela Dulko (first round)
12. (Russia) Maria Kirilenko / (Russia) Elena Vesnina (third round)
13. (Russia) Dinara Safina / (Italy) Roberta Vinci (first round)
14. (Russia) Vera Dushevina / (Ukraine) Tatiana Perebiynis (first round)
15. (United States) Vania King / (Croatia) Jelena Kostanić Tošić (first round)
16. (India) Sania Mirza / (Israel) Shahar Pe'er (third round)

Click on the seed number of a player to go to their draw section.

== Draw ==
=== Key ===
- Q = Qualifier
- WC = Wild card
- LL = Lucky loser
- Alt = Alternate
- ITF = ITF entry
- PR = Protected ranking
- SR = Special ranking
- SE = Special exempt
- JE = Junior exempt
- JR = Junior Accelerator Programme entrant
- CO = College Accelerator Programme entrant
- NG = Next Gen Accelerator Program entrant
- w/o = Walkover
- r = Retired
- d = Defaulted

=== Finals ===
Quarterfinals
1	(United States) Lisa Raymond (Australia) Samantha Stosur	7	6
5	(Czech Republic) Květa Peschke (Australia) Rennae Stubbs	5	2
4	(Slovenia) Katarina Srebotnik (Japan) Ai Sugiyama	6	7^{7}
10	(Russia) Elena Likhovtseva (China) Sun Tiantian	4	6^{5}
6	(Australia) Alicia Molik (Italy) Mara Santangelo	6	6
(China) Peng Shuai (China) Yan Zi	4	1
(Russia) Svetlana Kuznetsova (Russia) Nadia Petrova	4	6^{6}
2	(Zimbabwe) Cara Black (South Africa) Liezel Huber	6	7^{8}

Semifinals
1	(United States) Lisa Raymond (Australia) Samantha Stosur	6	3	2
4	(Slovenia) Katarina Srebotnik (Japan) Ai Sugiyama	1	6	6
6	(Australia) Alicia Molik (Italy) Mara Santangelo	4	6	1
2	(Zimbabwe) Cara Black (South Africa) Liezel Huber	6	4	6

Final
4	(Slovenia) Katarina Srebotnik (Japan) Ai Sugiyama	6	3	2
2	(Zimbabwe) Cara Black (South Africa) Liezel Huber	3	6	6

=== Top half ===
==== Section 1 ====
First round
1	(United States) L Raymond (Australia) S Stosur	6	3	6
(Czech Republic) L Hradecká (Czech Republic) R Voráčová	2	6	3
WC	(United Kingdom) E Baltacha (United Kingdom) N Cavaday	0	6^{7}
Q	(France) S Foretz (Tunisia) S Sfar	6	7^{9}
(Hungary) Á Szávay (Czech Republic) V Uhlířová	6	6^{2}	8
(Czech Republic) I Benešová (Russia) G Voskoboeva	4	7^{7}	6
Q	(Sweden) S Arvidsson (United States) L Osterloh	5	3
16	(India) S Mirza (Israel) S Pe'er	7	6
11	(Italy) ME Camerin (Argentina) G Dulko	3	7^{9}	6
(Netherlands) M Krajicek (Poland) A Radwańska	6	6^{7}	8
LL	(Czech Republic) A Hlaváčková (Germany) S Klösel	6	6
(Poland) K Jans (Poland) A Rosolska	2	4
(Spain) L Domínguez Lino (Spain) A Parra Santonja	6	6
(Czech Republic) P Cetkovská (Czech Republic) L Šafářová	1	2
(China) C Ji (China) S Sun	0	4
5	(Czech Republic) K Peschke (Australia) R Stubbs	6	6

Second round
1	(United States) L Raymond (Australia) S Stosur	6	6
Q	(France) S Foretz (Tunisia) S Sfar	2	4
(Hungary) Á Szávay (Czech Republic) V Uhlířová	4	3
16	(India) S Mirza (Israel) S Pe'er	6	6
(Netherlands) M Krajicek (Poland) A Radwańska	6	6
LL	(Czech Republic) A Hlaváčková (Germany) S Klösel	3	3
(Spain) L Domínguez Lino (Spain) A Parra Santonja	1	0
5	(Czech Republic) K Peschke (Australia) R Stubbs	6	6

Third round
1	(United States) L Raymond (Australia) S Stosur	6	6^{4}	6
16	(India) S Mirza (Israel) S Pe'er	0	7^{7}	1
(Netherlands) M Krajicek (Poland) A Radwańska	2	7	2
5	(Czech Republic) K Peschke (Australia) R Stubbs	6	5	6

Quarterfinals
1	(United States) L Raymond (Australia) S Stosur	7	6
5	(Czech Republic) K Peschke (Australia) R Stubbs	5	2

==== Section 2 ====
First round
4	(Slovenia) K Srebotnik (Japan) A Sugiyama	4	6	6
(Romania) A Ehritt-Vanc (Russia) A Rodionova	6	2	3
(France) É Loit (Australia) N Pratt	6	2	7
(Ukraine) Y Fedak (Estonia) K Kanepi	2	6	5
WC	(United Kingdom) S Borwell (United Kingdom) J Curtis	0	2
(France) M Bartoli (United States) M Tu	6	6
(Czech Republic) N Vaidišová (Czech Republic) B Záhlavová-Strýcová	6	6
14	(Russia) V Dushevina (Ukraine) T Perebiynis	2	2
10	(Russia) E Likhovtseva (China) T Sun	6	6
(Russia) O Puchkova (Venezuela) M Sequera	4	2
LL	(United Kingdom) A Fitzpatrick (United Kingdom) E Webley-Smith	1	4
(Japan) A Nakamura (Thailand) T Tanasugarn	6	6
WC	(United Kingdom) C Curran (United Kingdom) A Keothavong	1	3
WC	(United States) S Williams (United States) V Williams	6	6
(South Africa) N Grandin (France) C Pin	4	4
8	(Spain) A Medina Garrigues (Spain) V Ruano Pascual	6	6

Second round
4	(Slovenia) K Srebotnik (Japan) A Sugiyama	6	6
(France) É Loit (Australia) N Pratt	0	3
(France) M Bartoli (United States) M Tu	7	7^{8}
(Czech Republic) N Vaidišová (Czech Republic) B Záhlavová-Strýcová	5	6^{6}
10	(Russia) E Likhovtseva (China) T Sun	6	0	9
(Japan) A Nakamura (Thailand) T Tanasugarn	4	6	7
WC	(United States) S Williams (United States) V Williams	w/o
8	(Spain) A Medina Garrigues (Spain) V Ruano Pascual

Third round
4	(Slovenia) K Srebotnik (Japan) A Sugiyama
(France) M Bartoli (United States) M Tu	w/o
10	(Russia) E Likhovtseva (China) T Sun	4	6	6
8	(Spain) A Medina Garrigues (Spain) V Ruano Pascual	6	1	4

Quarterfinals
4	(Slovenia) K Srebotnik (Japan) A Sugiyama	6	7^{7}
10	(Russia) E Likhovtseva (China) T Sun	4	6^{5}

=== Bottom half ===
==== Section 3 ====
First round
6	(Australia) A Molik (Italy) M Santangelo	6	6
(United States) C Morariu (Switzerland) P Schnyder	1	3
(France) S Cohen-Aloro (France) V Razzano	1	2
(Ukraine) A Bondarenko (Ukraine) K Bondarenko	6	6
Q	(Chinese Taipei) S-w Hsieh (Russia) A Kudryavtseva	3	5
(Belarus) V Azarenka (Russia) A Chakvetadze	6	7
(France) A Rezaï (Ukraine) J Vakulenko	0^{r}
12	(Russia) M Kirilenko (Russia) E Vesnina	5
13	(Russia) D Safina (Italy) R Vinci	6	5	3
(Greece) E Daniilidou (Germany) J Wöhr	3	7	6
(United States) A Harkleroad (Israel) T Obziler	6	4	2
(China) S Peng (China) Z Yan	4	6	6
Q	(United States) J Ditty (United States) R Kops-Jones	6^{5}	6	2
(Finland) E Laine (Spain) MJ Martínez Sánchez	7^{7}	0	6
(Slovakia) D Hantuchová (Serbia) A Ivanovic	6^{4}	4
3	(Chinese Taipei) Y-j Chan (Chinese Taipei) C-j Chuang	7^{7}	6

Second round
6	(Australia) A Molik (Italy) M Santangelo	6	6
(Ukraine) A Bondarenko (Ukraine) K Bondarenko	2	0
(Belarus) V Azarenka (Russia) A Chakvetadze	7^{7}	1	6
12	(Russia) M Kirilenko (Russia) E Vesnina	6^{3}	6	8
(Greece) E Daniilidou (Germany) J Wöhr	0	3
(China) S Peng (China) Z Yan	6	6
(Finland) E Laine (Spain) MJ Martínez Sánchez	4	2
3	(Chinese Taipei) Y-j Chan (Chinese Taipei) C-j Chuang	6	6

Third round
6	(Australia) A Molik (Italy) M Santangelo	4	6	6
12	(Russia) M Kirilenko (Russia) E Vesnina	6	3	3
(China) S Peng (China) Z Yan	6	6
3	(Chinese Taipei) Y-j Chan (Chinese Taipei) C-j Chuang	3	2

Quarterfinals
6	(Australia) A Molik (Italy) M Santangelo	6	6
(China) S Peng (China) Z Yan	4	1

==== Section 4 ====
First round
7	(Slovakia) J Husárová (United States) M Shaughnessy	6	7
WC	(United Kingdom) K Paterson (United Kingdom) M South	1	5
(Slovakia) J Gajdošová (Japan) A Morigami	6	6
(Switzerland) E Gagliardi (Italy) F Schiavone	4	2
(Germany) A-L Grönefeld (Germany) T Malek	6	1	6
LL	(Czech Republic) H Šromová (Czech Republic) K Zakopalová	3	6	2
(Russia) S Kuznetsova (Russia) N Petrova	7^{7}	6
9	(Italy) T Garbin (Argentina) P Suárez	6^{4}	3
15	(United States) V King (Croatia) J Kostanić Tošić	3	4
(United States) J Craybas (United States) L Granville	6	6
(Russia) E Dementieva (Italy) F Pennetta	6	6
(Austria) S Bammer (Austria) T Paszek	1	0
(United States) B Mattek (Australia) B Stewart	7^{7}	7
(Germany) M Müller (Czech Republic) G Navrátilová	6^{1}	5
(France) S Brémond (France) N Dechy	6^{4}	3
2	(Zimbabwe) C Black (South Africa) L Huber	7^{7}	6

Second round
7	(Slovakia) J Husárová (United States) M Shaughnessy	7	4	8
(Slovakia) J Gajdošová (Japan) A Morigami	5	6	6
(Germany) A-L Grönefeld (Germany) T Malek	2	0
(Russia) S Kuznetsova (Russia) N Petrova	6	6
(United States) J Craybas (United States) L Granville	6	6
(Russia) E Dementieva (Italy) F Pennetta	3	3
(United States) B Mattek (Australia) B Stewart	3	3
2	(Zimbabwe) C Black (South Africa) L Huber	6	6

Third round
7	(Slovakia) J Husárová (United States) M Shaughnessy	3	4
(Russia) S Kuznetsova (Russia) N Petrova	6	6
(United States) J Craybas (United States) L Granville	1	1
2	(Zimbabwe) C Black (South Africa) L Huber	6	6

Quarterfinals
(Russia) S Kuznetsova (Russia) N Petrova	4	6^{6}
2	(Zimbabwe) C Black (South Africa) L Huber	6	7^{8}
