= 2006 French Open – Men's singles qualifying =

Men's singles qualifying
- 2006 French Open

Events
Singles	men	women		boys	girls
Doubles	men	women	mixed	boys	girls
WC Singles	men	women	quad
WC Doubles	men	women	quad
Legends	−45	45+	women

Qualification
Singles	men	women
- French Open

This article displays the qualifying draw for the Men's Singles at the 2006 French Open.

== Seeds ==
1. (Germany) Simon Greul (first round)
2. (South Korea) Lee Hyung-taik (first round)
3. (Paraguay) Ramón Delgado (first round)
4. (Russia) Igor Kunitsyn (second round)
5. (Belgium) Dick Norman (qualified)
6. (Netherlands) Melle van Gemerden (qualifying competition, lucky loser)
7. (United States) Bobby Reynolds (first round)
8. (Germany) Denis Gremelmayr (second round)
9. (United States) Kevin Kim (qualifying competition, lucky loser)
10. (Argentina) Sergio Roitman (qualified)
11. (Russia) Teymuraz Gabashvili (second round)
12. (Austria) Stefan Koubek (second round)
13. (Germany) Michael Berrer (first round)
14. (Canada) Frank Dancevic (first round)
15. (Poland) Łukasz Kubot (first round)
16. (Spain) Óscar Hernández (qualified)
17. (Brazil) Thiago Alves (first round)
18. (France) Cyril Saulnier (qualifying competition)
19. (United Kingdom) Alex Bogdanovic (second round)
20. (South Africa) Rik de Voest (first round)
21. (Colombia) Alejandro Falla (qualifying competition, lucky loser)
22. (Argentina) Juan Martín del Potro (qualified)
23. (Australia) Peter Luczak (second round)
24. (Germany) Tomas Behrend (first round)
25. (Denmark) Kristian Pless (qualified)
26. (Brazil) Ricardo Mello (first round)
27. (Switzerland) George Bastl (first round)
28. (France) Antony Dupuis (second round)
29. (Monaco) Jean-René Lisnard (first round)
30. (Argentina) Diego Junqueira (qualifying competition)
31. (Spain) Iván Navarro (qualifying competition)
32. (Russia) Evgeny Korolev (qualified)

== Qualifiers ==
1. (Australia) Wayne Arthurs
2. (Croatia) Roko Karanušić
3. (Argentina) Martín Vassallo Argüello
4. (Argentina) Juan Martín del Potro
5. (Belgium) Dick Norman
6. (Italy) Stefano Galvani
7. (Argentina) Edgardo Massa
8. (Denmark) Kristian Pless
9. (Russia) Evgeny Korolev
10. (Argentina) Sergio Roitman
11. (Germany) Dieter Kindlmann
12. (Croatia) Saša Tuksar
13. (Serbia and Montenegro) Ilija Bozoljac
14. (Argentina) Diego Hartfield
15. (Brazil) Júlio Silva
16. (Spain) Óscar Hernández

== Lucky losers ==
1. (Netherlands) Melle van Gemerden
2. (United States) Kevin Kim
3. (Colombia) Alejandro Falla

== Qualifying draw ==
Key

- Q = Qualifier
- WC = Wild card
- LL = Lucky loser
- Alt = Alternate
- ITF = ITF entry
- PR = Protected ranking
- SR = Special ranking
- SE = Special exempt
- JE = Junior exempt
- JR = Junior Accelerator Programme entrant
- CO = College Accelerator Programme entrant
- NG = Next Gen Accelerator Program entrant
- w/o = Walkover
- r = Retired
- d = Defaulted

=== First qualifier ===
First round
1	(Germany) Simon Greul	2	6	5
(France) Stéphane Robert	6	4	7
(United States) Hugo Armando	6^{6}	6	3
(Israel) Noam Okun	7^{8}	4	6
(United Kingdom) Arvind Parmar	6	6^{3}	8
(Australia) Wayne Arthurs	2	7^{7}	10
PR	(Netherlands) John van Lottum	3	6	10
26	(Brazil) Ricardo Mello	6	3	8

Second round
(France) Stéphane Robert	6	7
(Israel) Noam Okun	2	5
(Australia) Wayne Arthurs	7^{7}	6
PR	(Netherlands) John van Lottum	6^{2}	3

Qualifying competition
(France) Stéphane Robert	6^{6}	4
(Australia) Wayne Arthurs	7^{8}	6

=== Second qualifier ===
First round
2	(South Korea) Lee Hyung-taik	3	4
(Spain) Álex Calatrava	6	6
(France) Nicolas Devilder	2	4
(Croatia) Roko Karanušić	6	6
(United States) Glenn Weiner	1	2
(Czech Republic) Jan Hájek	6	6
(Serbia and Montenegro) Viktor Troicki	6^{4}	6	6
27	(Switzerland) George Bastl	7^{7}	2	4

Second round
(Spain) Álex Calatrava	7^{7}	3	1
(Croatia) Roko Karanušić	6^{5}	6	6
(Czech Republic) Jan Hájek	6	6
(Serbia and Montenegro) Viktor Troicki	1	2

Qualifying competition
(Croatia) Roko Karanušić	6	6
(Czech Republic) Jan Hájek	4	4

=== Third qualifier ===
First round
3	(Paraguay) Ramón Delgado	1	3
(Greece) Vasilis Mazarakis	6	6
(United States) Scoville Jenkins	1	1
(Argentina) Martín Vassallo Argüello	6	6
(United States) Eric Taino	6	3	7
WC	(France) Adrian Mannarino	1	6	9
(Belgium) Steve Darcis	6	1	6
29	(Monaco) Jean-René Lisnard	3	6	4

Second round
(Greece) Vasilis Mazarakis	6	6^{5}	3
(Argentina) Martín Vassallo Argüello	4	7^{7}	6
WC	(France) Adrian Mannarino	4	6	6
(Belgium) Steve Darcis	6	1	8

Qualifying competition
(Argentina) Martín Vassallo Argüello	6	6
(Belgium) Steve Darcis	4	1

=== Fourth qualifier ===
First round
4	(Russia) Igor Kunitsyn	7^{7}	6
(Argentina) Juan Pablo Brzezicki	6^{5}	1
(Spain) Carlos Cuadrado	6^{3}	6	3
WC	(France) Ludwig Pellerin	7^{7}	4	6
(Uzbekistan) Denis Istomin	4	2
(Argentina) Máximo González	6	6
(Brazil) André Sá	6	4	3
22	(Argentina) Juan Martín del Potro	1	6	6

Second round
4	(Russia) Igor Kunitsyn	6	1	4
WC	(France) Ludwig Pellerin	1	6	6
(Argentina) Máximo González	3	5
22	(Argentina) Juan Martín del Potro	6	7

Qualifying competition
WC	(France) Ludwig Pellerin	3	3
22	(Argentina) Juan Martín del Potro	6	6

=== Fifth qualifier ===
First round
5	(Belgium) Dick Norman	6	7
(Czech Republic) Jan Vacek	3	5
(Germany) Dominik Meffert	6^{5}	1
(Germany) Benedikt Dorsch	7^{7}	6
PR	(Argentina) Marcelo Charpentier	6	6
(United States) Brian Vahaly	4	4
(Algeria) Slimane Saoudi	3	3
19	(United Kingdom) Alex Bogdanovic	6	6

Second round
5	(Belgium) Dick Norman	6	7^{10}
(Germany) Benedikt Dorsch	3	6^{8}
PR	(Argentina) Marcelo Charpentier	5	6	7
19	(United Kingdom) Alex Bogdanovic	7	4	5

Qualifying competition
5	(Belgium) Dick Norman	7^{7}	4	7
PR	(Argentina) Marcelo Charpentier	6^{4}	6	5

=== Sixth qualifier ===
First round
6	(Netherlands) Melle van Gemerden	6	6
(Greece) Konstantinos Economidis	3	2
(Switzerland) Michael Lammer	6	7^{7}
(India) Rohan Bopanna	4	6^{0}
(Italy) Stefano Galvani	7	6
(Italy) Francesco Aldi	5	3
(Monaco) Benjamin Balleret	6	7
24	(Germany) Tomas Behrend	3	5

Second round
6	(Netherlands) Melle van Gemerden	6^{4}	6	6
(Switzerland) Michael Lammer	7^{7}	2	3
(Italy) Stefano Galvani	6	6
(Monaco) Benjamin Balleret	4	4

Qualifying competition
6	(Netherlands) Melle van Gemerden	3	4
(Italy) Stefano Galvani	6	6

=== Seventh qualifier ===
First round
7	(United States) Bobby Reynolds	2	5
(United States) Amer Delić	6	7
WC	(France) Josselin Ouanna	4	4
PR	(Argentina) Edgardo Massa	6	6
(United States) Phillip Simmonds	1	2
(United States) Cecil Mamiit	6	6
(Germany) Andreas Beck	6	6
20	(South Africa) Rik de Voest	4	1

Second round
(United States) Amer Delić	6^{3}	3
PR	(Argentina) Edgardo Massa	7^{7}	6
(United States) Cecil Mamiit	3	6^{4}
(Germany) Andreas Beck	6	7^{7}

Qualifying competition
PR	(Argentina) Edgardo Massa	7^{7}	6
(Germany) Andreas Beck	6^{3}	3

=== Eighth qualifier ===
First round
8	(Germany) Denis Gremelmayr	6	6
(France) Nicolas Thomann	1	4
(Spain) Gorka Fraile	6	6
(Netherlands Antilles) Jean-Julien Rojer	3	3
WC	(France) Laurent Recouderc	6	6
(Czech Republic) Pavel Šnobel	2	1
(Czech Republic) Jan Mertl	4	3
25	(Denmark) Kristian Pless	6	6

Second round
8	(Germany) Denis Gremelmayr	5	0^{r}
(Spain) Gorka Fraile	7	4
WC	(France) Laurent Recouderc	6^{4}	4
25	(Denmark) Kristian Pless	7^{7}	6

Qualifying competition
(Spain) Gorka Fraile	4	4
25	(Denmark) Kristian Pless	6	6

=== Ninth qualifier ===
First round
9	(United States) Kevin Kim	7	6
(Belgium) Gilles Elseneer	5	4
(Italy) Federico Luzzi	4	2
(Spain) Daniel Gimeno-Traver	6	6
(Georgia (country)) Irakli Labadze	4	1
(Austria) Werner Eschauer	6	6
(Italy) Giorgio Galimberti	6	2	4
32	(Russia) Evgeny Korolev	4	6	6

Second round
9	(United States) Kevin Kim	4	6	6
(Spain) Daniel Gimeno-Traver	6	4	2
(Austria) Werner Eschauer	3	3
32	(Russia) Evgeny Korolev	6	6

Qualifying competition
9	(United States) Kevin Kim	3	6	4
32	(Russia) Evgeny Korolev	6	3	6

=== Tenth qualifier ===
First round
10	(Argentina) Sergio Roitman	7^{7}	6
(Netherlands) Peter Wessels	6^{4}	3
(Slovakia) Ivo Klec	5	6^{2}
(Germany) Lars Burgsmüller	7	7^{7}
(United States) Jesse Witten	6	6
(Austria) Daniel Köllerer	3	4
WC	(France) Nicolas Renavand	5	3
30	(Argentina) Diego Junqueira	7	6

Second round
10	(Argentina) Sergio Roitman	6	6
(Germany) Lars Burgsmüller	4	4
(United States) Jesse Witten	6	3	4
30	(Argentina) Diego Junqueira	4	6	6

Qualifying competition
10	(Argentina) Sergio Roitman	6	6
30	(Argentina) Diego Junqueira	3	0

=== Eleventh qualifier ===
First round
11	(Russia) Teymuraz Gabashvili	1	6	6
(United States) Michael Russell	6	3	4
(Mexico) Santiago González	2	3
(Germany) Benjamin Becker	6	6
(Sweden) Jacob Adaktusson	3	2
(Spain) Santiago Ventura	6	6
PR	(Germany) Dieter Kindlmann	6	6
17	(Brazil) Thiago Alves	4	3

Second round
11	(Russia) Teymuraz Gabashvili	4	7^{7}	4
(Germany) Benjamin Becker	6	6^{4}	6
(Spain) Santiago Ventura	7^{7}	3	3
PR	(Germany) Dieter Kindlmann	6^{1}	6	6

Qualifying competition
(Germany) Benjamin Becker	1	2
PR	(Germany) Dieter Kindlmann	6	6

=== Twelfth qualifier ===
First round
12	(Austria) Stefan Koubek	6	3	6
(United States) Zack Fleishman	1	6	4
PR	(Argentina) Juan Pablo Guzmán	1	3
(Croatia) Saša Tuksar	6	6
(Serbia and Montenegro) Dušan Vemić	6^{5}	4
(Italy) Simone Bolelli	7^{7}	6
(France) Jérôme Haehnel	6^{5}	3
31	(Spain) Iván Navarro	7^{7}	6

Second round
12	(Austria) Stefan Koubek	1	3
(Croatia) Saša Tuksar	6	6
(Italy) Simone Bolelli	6^{5}	6	4
31	(Spain) Iván Navarro	7^{7}	2	6

Qualifying competition
(Croatia) Saša Tuksar	7^{7}	6
31	(Spain) Iván Navarro	6^{4}	3

=== Thirteenth qualifier ===
First round
13	(Germany) Michael Berrer	5	6^{5}
(Austria) Rainer Eitzinger	7	7^{7}
(Belgium) Stefan Wauters	5	6^{2}
(Serbia and Montenegro) Ilija Bozoljac	7	7^{7}
(Italy) Uros Vico	1	4
WC	(France) Alexandre Sidorenko	6	6
WC	(France) Gary Lugassy	2	3
23	(Australia) Peter Luczak	6	6

Second round
(Austria) Rainer Eitzinger	2	6	3
(Serbia and Montenegro) Ilija Bozoljac	6	4	6
WC	(France) Alexandre Sidorenko	6	6
23	(Australia) Peter Luczak	0	3

Qualifying competition
(Serbia and Montenegro) Ilija Bozoljac	6	6
WC	(France) Alexandre Sidorenko	3	3

=== Fourteenth qualifier ===
First round
14	(Canada) Frank Dancevic	3	6^{4}
(Italy) Flavio Cipolla	6	7^{7}
(Argentina) Diego Hartfield	6	7^{7}
(United States) Alex Bogomolov Jr.	2	6^{5}
(Israel) Harel Levy	3	6	7
(Argentina) Mariano Zabaleta	6	3	5
(Australia) Chris Guccione	4	6	3
21	(Colombia) Alejandro Falla	6	3	6

Second round
(Italy) Flavio Cipolla	6	4	5
(Argentina) Diego Hartfield	2	6	7
(Israel) Harel Levy	5	6^{4}
21	(Colombia) Alejandro Falla	7	7^{7}

Qualifying competition
(Argentina) Diego Hartfield	6	6
21	(Colombia) Alejandro Falla	1	4

=== Fifteenth qualifier ===
First round
15	(Poland) Łukasz Kubot	5	6	3
(Israel) Dudi Sela	7	4	6
(Brazil) Júlio Silva	7^{7}	6
(France) Jean-Michel Pequery	6^{3}	4
(Czech Republic) Tomáš Cakl	7^{10}	7
(Romania) Victor Crivoi	6^{8}	5
WC	(France) Arnaud Di Pasquale	6	5	4
28	(France) Antony Dupuis	2	7	6

Second round
(Israel) Dudi Sela	6^{2}	6^{7}
(Brazil) Júlio Silva	7^{7}	7^{9}
(Czech Republic) Tomáš Cakl	7	7^{9}
28	(France) Antony Dupuis	5	6^{7}

Qualifying competition
(Brazil) Júlio Silva	6	7
(Czech Republic) Tomáš Cakl	2	5

=== Sixteenth qualifier ===
First round
16	(Spain) Óscar Hernández	3	6	6
(Australia) Alun Jones	6	1	3
(Sweden) Filip Prpic	6	6
(Canada) Frédéric Niemeyer	2	4
WC	(Croatia) Marin Čilić	6	6
(France) Grégory Carraz	3	2
(Slovakia) Michal Mertiňák	2	4
18	(France) Cyril Saulnier	6	6

Second round
16	(Spain) Óscar Hernández	6	6
(Sweden) Filip Prpic	3	2
WC	(Croatia) Marin Čilić	4	4
18	(France) Cyril Saulnier	6	6

Qualifying competition
16	(Spain) Óscar Hernández	6	6
18	(France) Cyril Saulnier	4	0
