= Lukáš Dlouhý =

Czech tennis player (born 1983)

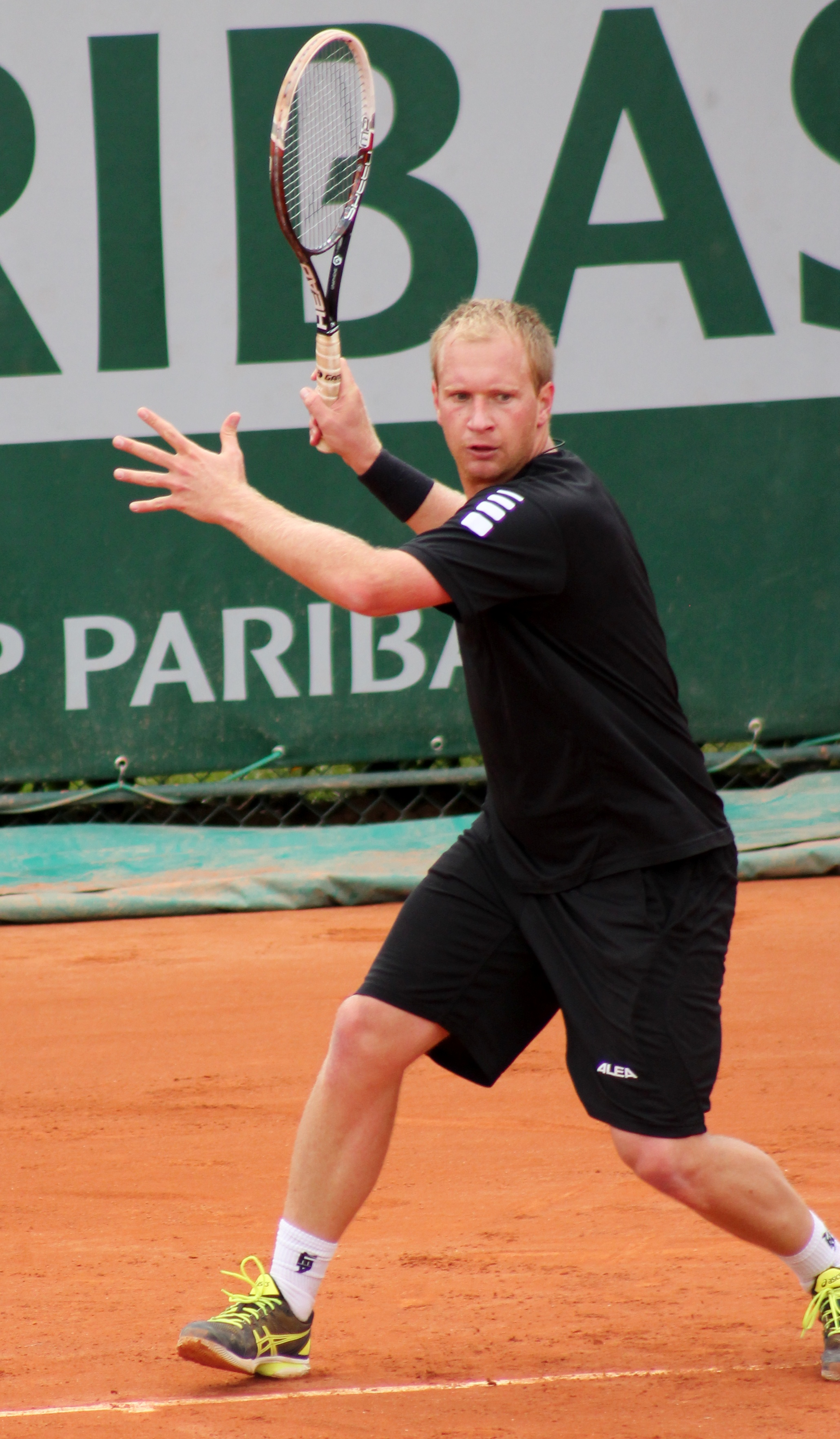
- Country (sports): Czech Republic
- Residence: Monte Carlo, Monaco
- Born: 9 April 1983 (age 43) Písek, Czechoslovakia
- Height: 1.85 m (6 ft 1 in)
- Turned pro: 2001
- Retired: 2016 (last match played)
- Plays: Right-handed (two-handed backhand)
- Prize money: $3,120,507

Singles
- Career record: 22–54
- Career titles: 0
- Highest ranking: No. 73 (3 April 2006)

Grand Slam singles results
- Australian Open: 2R (2007)
- French Open: 3R (2006)
- Wimbledon: 2R (2006)
- US Open: 1R (2006)

Doubles
- Career record: 225–195
- Career titles: 10
- Highest ranking: No. 5 (22 June 2009)

Grand Slam doubles results
- Australian Open: SF (2009)
- French Open: W (2009)
- Wimbledon: SF (2008)
- US Open: W (2009)

Other doubles tournaments
- Tour Finals: RR (2007)
- Last updated on: 22 November 2014.

Lukáš Dlouhý (born 9 April 1983) is a retired professional Czech tennis player on the ATP Tour. A doubles specialist, Dlouhý reached a career-high ranking of world No. 5 in June 2009 and won 10 doubles titles during his career.

== Career ==
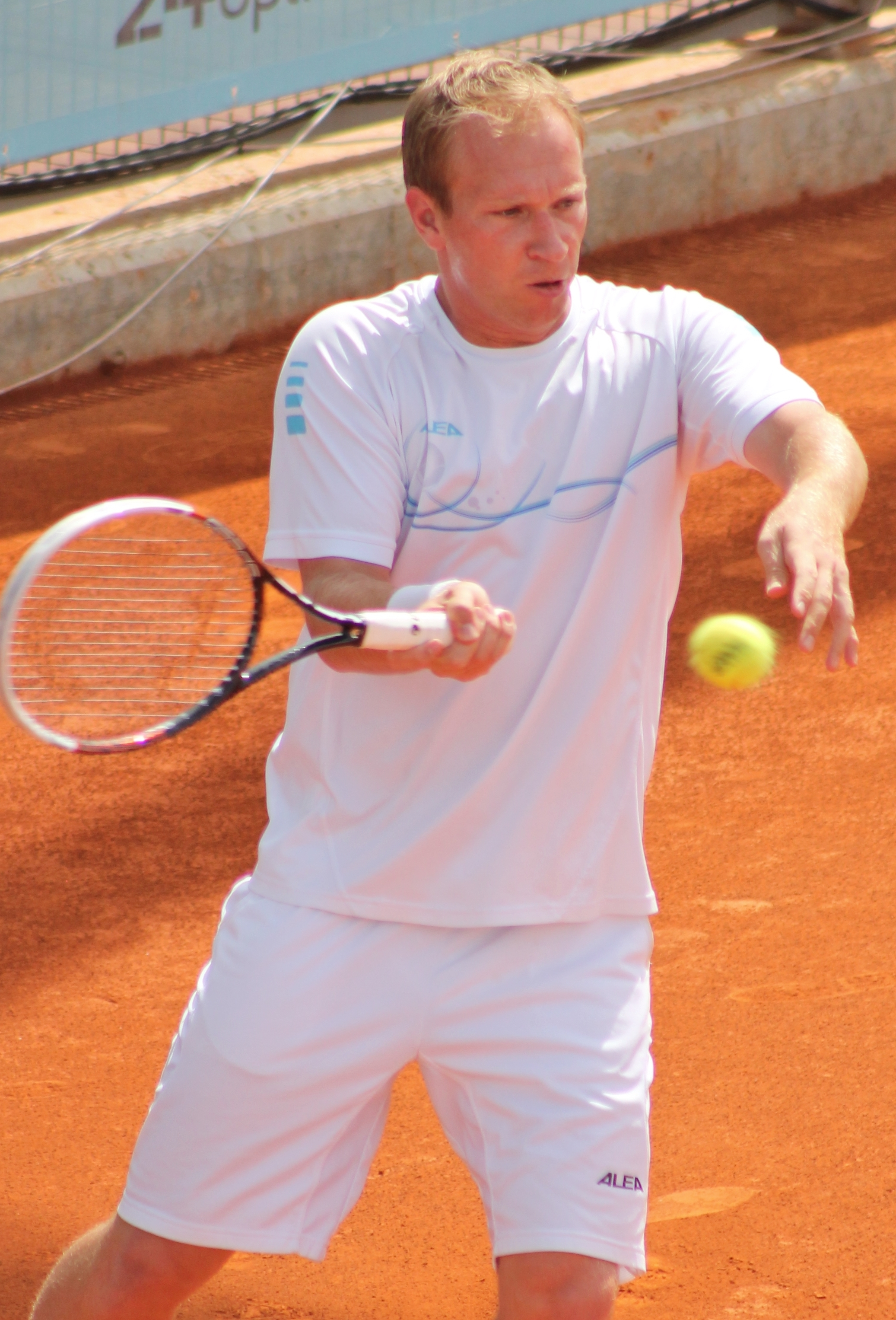
Dlouhy, 2014

Dlouhý has been part of two long-term doubles partnerships, first with countryman and coach Pavel Vízner and actively with Leander Paes. He has reached numerous grand slam finals with each. At the 2006 French Open, he reached the third round of the men's singles event and the semifinals of the men's doubles tournament with Vízner. In 2007, Dlouhý and Vízner reached two grand slam finals at the 2007 French Open and 2007 US Open.

He was the last coach of Barbora Strýcová before she ended her career.

== Significant finals ==
=== Grand Slam finals ===
==== Doubles: 6 (2–4) ====
| Result | Year | Championship | Surface | Partner | Opponents | Score |
|---|---|---|---|---|---|---|
| Loss | 2007 | French Open | Clay | (Czech Republic) Pavel Vízner | (The Bahamas) Mark Knowles (Canada) Daniel Nestor | 6–2, 3–6, 4–6 |
| Loss | 2007 | US Open | Hard | (Czech Republic) Pavel Vízner | (Sweden) Simon Aspelin (Austria) Julian Knowle | 5–7, 4–6 |
| Loss | 2008 | US Open | Hard | (India) Leander Paes | (United States) Bob Bryan (United States) Mike Bryan | 6–7^{(5–7)}, 6–7^{(10–12)} |
| Win | 2009 | French Open | Clay | (India) Leander Paes | (South Africa) Wesley Moodie (Belgium) Dick Norman | 3–6, 6–3, 6–2 |
| Winn | 2009 | US Open | Hard | (India) Leander Paes | (India) Mahesh Bhupathi (The Bahamas) Mark Knowles | 3–6, 6–3, 6–2 |
| Loss | 2010 | French Open | Clay | (India) Leander Paes | (Canada) Daniel Nestor (Serbia) Nenad Zimonjić | 5–7, 2–6 |

=== Masters 1000 finals ===
==== Doubles: 1 (1–0) ====
| Result | Year | Tournament | Surface | Partner | Opponents | Score |
|---|---|---|---|---|---|---|
| Win | 2010 | Miami | Hard | (India) Leander Paes | (India) Mahesh Bhupathi (Belarus) Max Mirnyi | 6–2, 7–5 |

== ATP career finals ==
=== Doubles: 26 (10–16) ===
Legend (doubles)
Grand Slam Tournaments (2–4)
ATP World Tour Finals (0–0)
ATP World Tour Masters 1000 (1–0)
ATP World Tour 500 Series (0–5)
ATP World Tour 250 Series (7–7)

| Result | No. | Date | Tournament | Surface | Partner | Opponents | Score |
|---|---|---|---|---|---|---|---|
| Win | 1. | Feb 2006 | Brasil Open, Brazil | Clay | (Czech Republic) Pavel Vízner | (Poland) Mariusz Fyrstenberg (Poland) Marcin Matkowski | 6–1, 4–6, [10–3] |
| Loss | 1. | Apr 2006 | Open de Tenis Comunidad Valenciana, Spain | Clay | (Czech Republic) Pavel Vízner | (Czech Republic) David Škoch (Czech Republic) Tomáš Zíb | 4–6, 3–6 |
| Win | 2. | May 2006 | Estoril Open, Portugal | Clay | (Czech Republic) Pavel Vízner | (Argentina) Lucas Arnold Ker (Czech Republic) Leoš Friedl | 6–3, 6–1 |
| Win | 3. | Feb 2007 | Brasil Open, Brazil | Clay | (Czech Republic) Pavel Vízner | (Spain) Álbert Montañés (Spain) Rubén Ramírez Hidalgo | 6–2, 7–6^{(7–4)} |
| Loss | 2. | Feb 2007 | Abierto Mexicano TELCEL, Mexico | Clay | (Czech Republic) Pavel Vízner | (Italy) Potito Starace (Argentina) Martín Vassallo Argüello | 0–6, 2–6 |
| Loss | 3. | May 2007 | French Open, France | Clay | (Czech Republic) Pavel Vízner | (The Bahamas) Mark Knowles (Canada) Daniel Nestor | 6–2, 3–6, 4–6 |
| Win | 4. | Jul 2007 | Croatia Open Umag, Croatia | Clay | (Slovakia) Michal Mertiňák | (Czech Republic) Jaroslav Levinský (Czech Republic) David Škoch | 6–1, 6–1 |
| Loss | 4. | Aug 2007 | US Open, United States | Hard | (Czech Republic) Pavel Vízner | (Sweden) Simon Aspelin (Austria) Julian Knowle | 5–7, 4–6 |
| Loss | 5. | Jun 2008 | Gerry Weber Open, Germany | Grass | (India) Leander Paes | (Russia) Mikhail Youzhny (Germany) Mischa Zverev | 6–3, 4–6, [3–10] |
| Loss | 6. | Aug 2008 | US Open, United States | Hard | (India) Leander Paes | (United States) Bob Bryan (United States) Mike Bryan | 6–7^{(5–7)}, 6–7^{(10–12)} |
| Win | 5. | Sep 2008 | Thailand Open, Thailand | Hard | (India) Leander Paes | (United States) Scott Lipsky (United States) David Martin | 6–4, 7–6^{(7–4)} |
| Loss | 7. | Sep 2008 | AIG Japan Open Tennis Championships, Japan | Hard | (India) Leander Paes | (Russia) Mikhail Youzhny (Germany) Mischa Zverev | 3–6, 4–6 |
| Loss | 8. | Feb 2009 | ABN AMRO World Tennis Tournament, Netherlands | Hard | (India) Leander Paes | (Canada) Daniel Nestor (Serbia) Nenad Zimonjić | 2–6, 5–7 |
| Win | 6. | May 2009 | French Open, France | Clay | (India) Leander Paes | (South Africa) Wesley Moodie (Belgium) Dick Norman | 3–6, 6–3, 6–2 |
| Win | 7. | Aug 2009 | US Open, United States | Hard | (India) Leander Paes | (India) Mahesh Bhupathi (The Bahamas) Mark Knowles | 3–6, 6–3, 6–2 |
| Loss | 9. | Jan 2010 | Brisbane International, Australia | Hard | (India) Leander Paes | (France) Jérémy Chardy (France) Marc Gicquel | 3–6, 6–7^{(5–7)} |
| Loss | 10. | Feb 2010 | Dubai Tennis Championships, UAE | Hard | (India) Leander Paes | (Sweden) Simon Aspelin (Australia) Paul Hanley | 2–6, 3–6 |
| Win | 8. | Apr 2010 | Sony Ericsson Open, United States | Hard | (India) Leander Paes | (India) Mahesh Bhupathi (Belarus) Max Mirnyi | 6–2, 7–5 |
| Loss | 11. | Jun 2010 | French Open, France | Clay | (India) Leander Paes | (Canada) Daniel Nestor (Serbia) Nenad Zimonjić | 5–7, 2–6 |
| Loss | 12. | Jun 2010 | UNICEF Open, Netherlands | Grass | (India) Leander Paes | (Sweden) Robert Lindstedt (Romania) Horia Tecău | 6–1, 5–7, [7–10] |
| Win | 9. | Jan 2011 | Brisbane International, Australia | Hard | (Australia) Paul Hanley | (Sweden) Robert Lindstedt (Romania) Horia Tecău | 6–4, ret. |
| Win | 10. | Jan 2011 | Medibank International, Australia | Hard | (Australia) Paul Hanley | (United States) Bob Bryan (United States) Mike Bryan | 6–7^{(6–8)}, 6–3, [10–5] |
| Loss | 13. | Sep 2011 | Open de Moselle, France | Hard (i) | (Brazil) Marcelo Melo | (United Kingdom) Jamie Murray (Brazil) André Sá | 4–6, 6–7^{(7–9)} |
| Loss | 14. | Apr 2013 | BRD Năstase Ţiriac Trophy, Romania | Clay | (Austria) Oliver Marach | (Belarus) Max Mirnyi (Romania) Horia Tecău | 6–4, 4–6, [6–10] |
| Loss | 15. | Aug 2013 | Bet-at-home Cup Kitzbühel, Austria | Clay | (Czech Republic) František Čermák | (Germany) Martin Emmrich (Germany) Christopher Kas | 4–6, 3–6 |
| Loss | 16. | Apr 2014 | Grand Prix Hassan II, Morocco | Clay | (Poland) Tomasz Bednarek | (Netherlands) Jean-Julien Rojer (Romania) Horia Tecău | 2–6, 2–6 |

== Performance timelines ==
Key
| W | F | SF | QF | #R | RR | Q# | DNQ | A | NH |

(W) winner; (F) finalist; (SF) semifinalist; (QF) quarterfinalist; (#R) rounds 4, 3, 2, 1; (RR) round-robin stage; (Q#) qualification round; (DNQ) did not qualify; (A) absent; (NH) not held; (SR) strike rate (events won / competed); (W–L) win–loss record.

=== Singles ===
| Tournament | 2005 | 2006 | 2007 | 2008 | Career SR | Career win–loss |
|---|---|---|---|---|---|---|
Grand Slam tournaments
| Australian Open | A | 1R | 2R | 1R | 0 / 3 | 1–3 |
| French Open | 2R | 3R | 1R | A | 0 / 3 | 3–3 |
| Wimbledon | A | 2R | 1R | A | 0 / 2 | 1–2 |
| US Open | A | 1R | A | A | 0 / 1 | 0–1 |
| Grand Slam SR | 0 / 1 | 0 / 4 | 0 / 3 | 0 / 1 | 0 / 9 | N/A |
| Annual win–loss | 1–1 | 3–4 | 1–3 | 0–1 | N/A | 5–9 |

=== Doubles ===
| Tournament | 2000 | 2001 | 2002 | 2003 | 2004 | 2005 | 2006 | 2007 | 2008 | 2009 | 2010 | 2011 | 2012 | 2013 | 2014 | Career SR | Career win–loss |
|---|---|---|---|---|---|---|---|---|---|---|---|---|---|---|---|---|---|
Grand Slam tournaments
| Australian Open | A | A | A | A | A | A | 2R | 2R | 3R | SF | QF | 1R | A | QF | | 0 / 7 | 14–7 |
| French Open | A | A | A | A | A | A | SF | F | 3R | W | F | 1R | 2R | 1R | | 1 / 8 | 23–7 |
| Wimbledon | A | A | A | A | A | 1R | QF | QF | SF | 1R | 2R | QF | 1R | 1R | | 0 / 8 | 14–8 |
| US Open | A | A | A | A | A | A | 2R | F | F | W | 1R | 1R | 1R | 2R | | 1 / 7 | 18–7 |
| Grand Slam SR | 0 / 0 | 0 / 0 | 0 / 0 | 0 / 0 | 0 / 0 | 0 / 1 | 0 / 4 | 0 / 4 | 0 / 4 | 2 / 4 | 0 / 4 | 0 / 4 | 0 / 3 | 0 / 4 | | 2 / 34 | N/A |
| Annual win–loss | 0–0 | 0–0 | 0–0 | 0–0 | 0–0 | 0–1 | 9–4 | 14–4 | 13–4 | 16–2 | 9–4 | 3–4 | 1–3 | 3–3 | | N/A | 68–29 |
ATP Masters Series
| Indian Wells | A | A | A | A | A | A | A | 2R | 1R | 2R | 1R | QF | 0 / 5 | 4–5 | | | |
| Miami | A | A | A | A | A | A | A | 1R | 1R | 2R | W | 2R | 0 / 5 | 7–4 | | | |
| Monte Carlo | A | A | A | A | A | A | A | A | 2R | SF | 2R | 1R | 0 / 4 | 2–4 | | | |
| Rome | A | A | A | A | A | A | A | A | A | QF | QF | 1R | 0 / 3 | 1–3 | | | |
| Madrid | A | A | A | A | A | A | QF | A | 2R | A | SF | 1R | 0 / 4 | 2–3 | | | |
| Canada | A | A | A | A | A | A | 2R | A | SF | QF | 2R | 1R | 0 / 5 | 4–5 | | | |
| Cincinnati | A | A | A | A | A | A | 2R | SF | QF | 2R | 2R | 2R | 0 / 6 | 5–6 | | | |
| Shanghai | Not Held | | | | | | | | | 2R | 2R | A | 0 / 2 | 1–2 | | | |
| Paris | A | A | A | A | A | A | QF | QF | 2R | 2R | QF | A | 0 / 5 | 3–5 | | | |
| Hamburg | A | A | A | A | A | A | A | A | A | NM1 | | | 0 / 0 | 0–0 | | | |
| Masters Series SR | 0 / 0 | 0 / 0 | 0 / 0 | 0 / 0 | 0 / 0 | 0 / 0 | 0 / 4 | 0 / 4 | 0 / 7 | 0 / 8 | 0 / 9 | 0 / 7 | 0 / 39 | N/A | | | |
| Annual win–loss | 0–0 | 0–0 | 0–0 | 0–0 | 0–0 | 0–0 | 3–3 | 4–4 | 3–7 | 7–8 | 9–8 | 4–7 | N/A | 30–37 | | | |
| Year-end ranking | 711 | 404 | 330 | 416 | 199 | 82 | 20 | 9 | 13 | 6 | 9 | 42 | N/A | | | | |
