= Nenad Zimonjić =

Serbian tennis player and coach (born 1976)

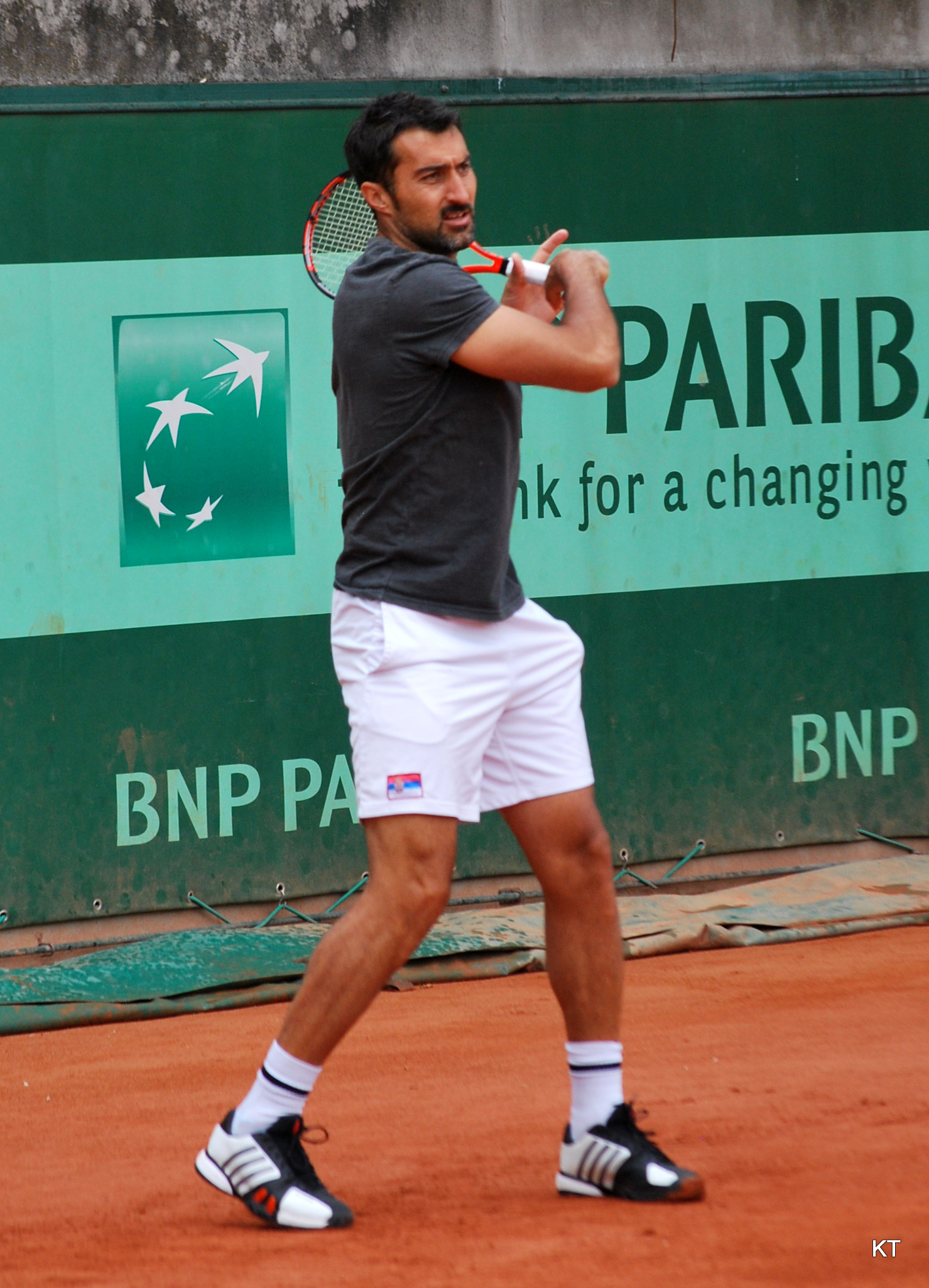
- Country (sports): FR Yugoslavia (1995–2003); Serbia and Montenegro (2003–2006); Serbia (2006–)
- Residence: Belgrade, Serbia
- Born: 4 June 1976 (age 50) Belgrade, SR Serbia, SFR Yugoslavia
- Height: 1.91 m (6 ft 3 in)
- Turned pro: 1995
- Retired: 2023
- Plays: Right-handed (one-handed backhand)
- Coach: Marko Nešić
- Prize money: US$8,437,703

Singles
- Career record: 12–25
- Career titles: 0
- Highest ranking: No. 176 (29 March 1999)

Grand Slam singles results
- Australian Open: 1R (2001)
- Wimbledon: 3R (1999)

Doubles
- Career record: 710–427
- Career titles: 54
- Highest ranking: No. 1 (17 November 2008)

Grand Slam doubles results
- Australian Open: F (2010)
- French Open: W (2010)
- Wimbledon: W (2008, 2009)
- US Open: QF (2006, 2009, 2015)

Other doubles tournaments
- Tour Finals: W (2008, 2010)

Mixed doubles
- Career titles: 5

Grand Slam mixed doubles results
- Australian Open: W (2004, 2008)
- French Open: W (2006, 2010)
- Wimbledon: W (2014)
- US Open: F (2005)

Team competitions
- Davis Cup: W (2010)

Nenad Zimonjić (Serbian Cyrillic: Ненад Зимоњић, pronounced [nênaːd zǐmoɲitɕ]; born 4 June 1976) is a Serbian former professional tennis player who was ranked world No. 1 in doubles.

He is an eight-time Grand Slam champion, having won the 2008 and 2009 Wimbledon Championships as well as the 2010 French Open in men's doubles partnering Daniel Nestor. In mixed doubles, Zimonjić won the 2004 Australian Open partnering Elena Bovina, the 2006 and 2010 French Opens partnering Katarina Srebotnik, the 2008 Australian Open partnering Sun Tiantian, and the 2014 Wimbledon Championships partnering Samantha Stosur. He has also reached nine further major finals across the two disciplines.

Zimonjić won 54 doubles titles on the ATP Tour, including the 2008 and 2010 Tour Finals, and 15 Masters 1000-level titles. He became the world No. 1 for the first time in November 2008, going on to spend 43 weeks at the top of the rankings over the next two years. Zimonjić was the second Serbian to top the doubles rankings, after Slobodan Živojinović in 1986.

In singles, he reached his career-high ranking of world No. 176 in March 1999, and achieved his best major result at the Wimbledon Championships that year, reaching the third round. Zimonjić represented Serbia in the Davis Cup from 1995 to 2017, competing in 55 ties and earning 43 victories, making him the most successful Davis Cup player in Serbian history. He was also part of the team that won the tournament in 2010, and served as captain from 2017 to 2020, overseeing Serbia's victory at the inaugural ATP Cup in 2020. Zimonjić also competed at the Olympic Games on four occasions.

== Career ==
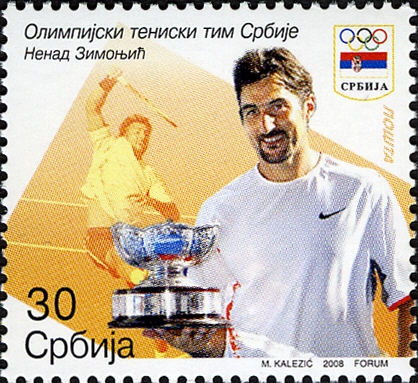
Nenad Zimonjić 2008 Serbian stamp

=== Doubles ===
Zimonjić turned pro in 1995 and remained relatively unknown outside his native country until a surprise victory in the mixed doubles at the 2004 Australian Open. Paired for the first time with Russian Elena Bovina, he beat defending champions Martina Navratilova and Leander Paes in straight sets in an hour and nine minutes. Alongside Katarina Srebotnik of Slovenia, he won the 2006 French Open crown with a straight-sets victory over Daniel Nestor and Elena Likhovtseva. At the 2006 Wimbledon Championships, Zimonjić reached the final of the men's doubles alongside France's Fabrice Santoro and the quarterfinals of the mixed doubles.

In 2007, Zimonjić reached the 2007 French Open mixed doubles final as the defending champions with Katarina Srebotnik and lost to Nathalie Dechy and Andy Ram. He left Santoro after Wimbledon and teamed with Mahesh Bhupathi until after the 2007 US Open. After the US Open, Nenad left Bhupathi and partnered with Daniel Nestor, who won the French Open earlier in the year alongside Mark Knowles. The team won the 2007 St. Petersburg Open, without losing a set. Nestor and Zimonjić later won 2008 Wimbledon On 27 January 2008, he won the mixed doubles title at the Australian Open, partnering with Sun Tiantian to defeat Sania Mirza and Mahesh Bhupathi in straight sets.

In 2009, Zimonjić and Nestor defended their Wimbledon title & won 5 Masters 1000 titles. At the World Team Cup as a part of the Serbian team. With Victor Troicki, he won two decisive games against Italian and Argentinian teams; as a result, Serbia finished first in its group, and then proceeded to beat Germany in the final encounter. In 2010, they finished runners-up at the Australian Open, later on in the year he won both the doubles with Daniel Nestor and the mixed doubles with Katarina Srebotnik at Roland Garros. Zimonjic ended his partnership with Nestor after winning the ATP World Tour Finals. In 2011, he partnered with Michaël Llodra, with whom he won one Masters 1000 title & four ATP 500 titles. Their partnership ended mid-way through 2012, after Roland Garros. In 2014, Zimonjic & Nestor renewed their partnership, which saw them both return to the top 10 by May & ranked 3 by the end of the year. In 2015 he started the year partnering Aisam-ul-Haq Qureshi, then teamed up with Marcin Matkowski; despite not winning a title together, the Polish-Serbian duo qualified for the World Tour Finals. Zimonjic won titles each year for 16 straight seasons and finished 12 consecutive seasons, starting in 2004, ranked in the ATP doubles top 20. Since 2016, when he played doubles at the Rio Olympics with Novak Djokovic, Zimonjic hasn't had a steady partner for a full season.

On 26 July 2017 the Serbian became the 10th player to record 700 doubles match wins (or more).

In June 2018, Zimonjic underwent bilateral hip replacement surgery. He returned to the ATP tour in February 2019 at the Sofia Open, where he and compatriot Viktor Troicki had won the doubles title two years prior.

==== 2021–2024: Hiatus, Wimbledon invitational, back to Challenger Tour ====
Although Zimonjic never officially announced his retirement, he did not play on the ATP Tour for more than two years from the 2021 Dubai Tennis Championships until 2023.

Partnering Marion Bartoli, Zimonjic won the inaugural 2022 Wimbledon mixed invitational in doubles. They beat Todd Woodbridge and Cara Black in straight sets in the final.

In 2023, partnering Rennae Stubbs, Zimonjic successfully defended his Wimbledon mixed invitation doubles title. They beat Greg Rusedski and Conchita Martinez in straight sets in the final.

In 2023 he announced his intention to return to the ATP Tour. During the summer of 2023 he played three ATP Challenger Tour events, but he lost in the first round in all three occasions.

In 2024, partnering Barbara Schett, he reached the final of 2024 Wimbledon Championships – Mixed invitation doubles. They were defeated by Mark Woodforde and his partner Dominika Cibulkova.

=== Singles ===
In August 1994, Zimonjić won his first professional singles title, beating Miles MacLagan on clay at a satellite tournament in Hungary. He went on to win four other ITF satellite events, as well as four Challenger tour titles in singles: Kyiv (Ukraine) in 1998, Belo Horizonte (Brazil) in 2000, Andrezieux (France) in 2001, and Belgrade (Serbia) in 2004. In 2004, he defeated Andre Agassi in St Pölten, and in 2005 on the grass of Halle, he defeated Nicolas Kiefer. Other recognised opponents include Ivo Karlovic in 2000, Nicolas Mahut in 2001.

=== Davis Cup and ATP Cup ===
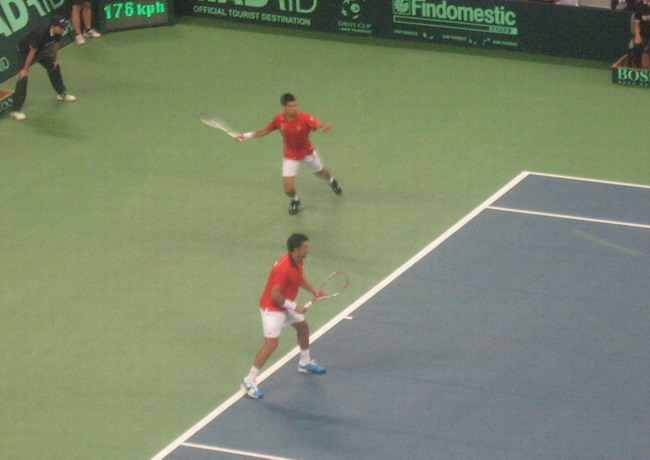
Zimonjić (in the front) with Novak Djokovic during the Davis Cup match against Czech Republic

Zimonjić has been a member of Serbia Davis Cup team (previously Yugoslavia Davis Cup team and Serbia and Montenegro Davis Cup team, respectively) since 1995, playing both singles and doubles, and in 2003–2004 he was the playing captain of the national team. In recent years, with the emergence of highly ranked Serbian singles players Novak Djokovic, Janko Tipsarević, and Viktor Troicki, Zimonjić became a doubles specialist on the team, partnering all of them, as well as Dušan Vemić and Ilija Bozoljac.

In 2010, Serbia won its first ever Davis Cup title, following the victories over United States (3–2), Croatia (4–1), Czech Republic (3–2), and France in the final match (3–2). Zimonjić played in all four doubles rubbers over the course of the competition, winning once (against Croatia, partnering Tipsarević) and losing the other three times (partnering Tipsarević, Djokovic, and Troicki, respectively). To celebrate the win, all the players shaved their heads. The central celebration was held in Belgrade in front of several thousand fans, and the Serbian national postal service issued a stamp picturing the players.

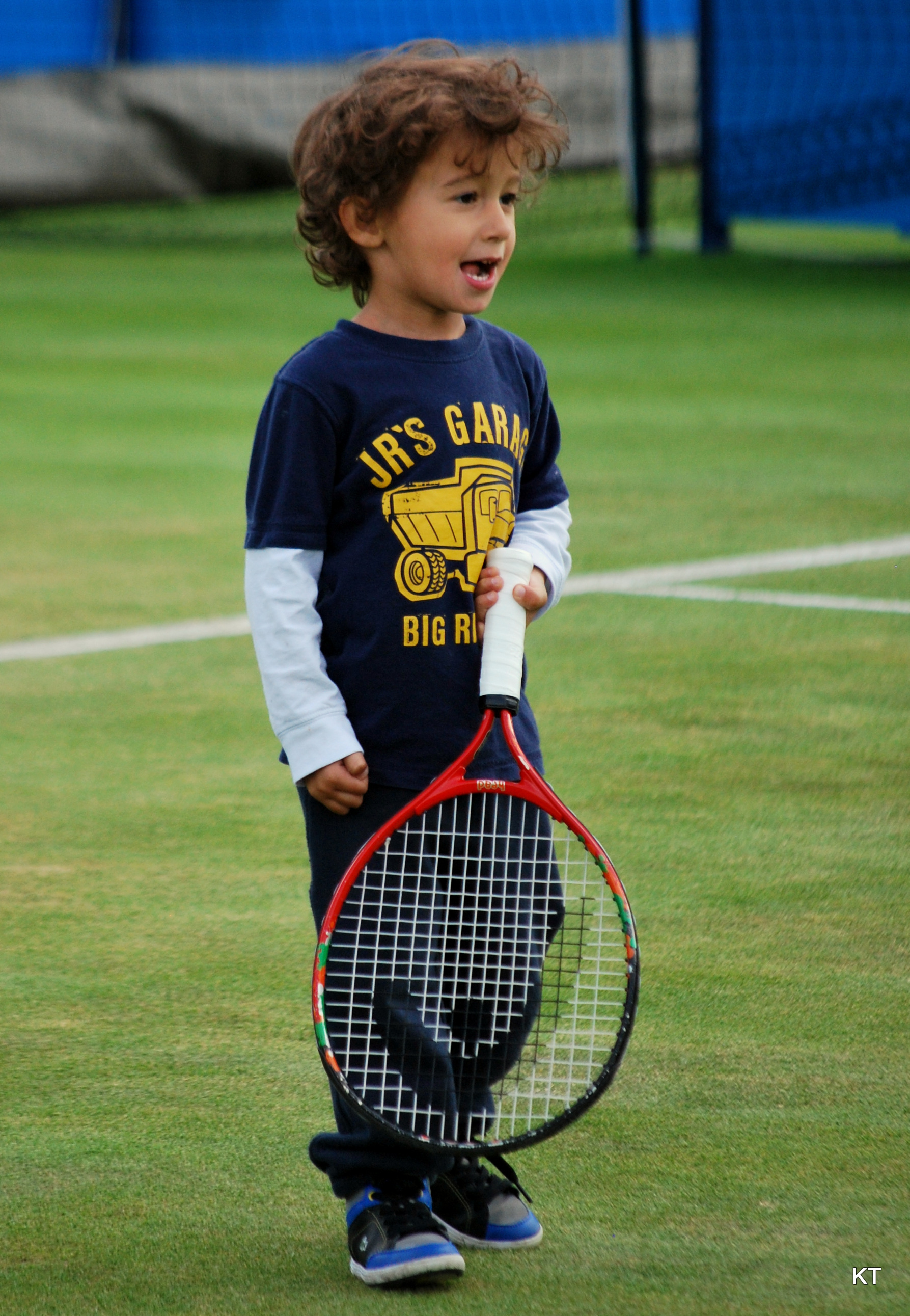
Leon Zimonjić in 2011

In the 2013 quarterfinals against the United States, he and Ilija Bozoljac had an impressive five set victory against the no. 1 ranked Bryan brothers.

Zimonjić was named Serbia Davis Cup team captain in 2003-2004 and from January 2017 till December 2020 when he was unexpectedly replaced by Victor Troicki. He was also the 2020 ATP Cup captain when Serbia won the inaugural 2020 cup.

== Personal life ==
Zimonjić was born in Belgrade, and was brought up in the Borča suburb, while he is currently living in New Belgrade. Zimonjić's paternal family hails from the Gacko region in Herzegovina, from where it settled in Vučkovica near Kragujevac, while his mother was born in Gospić, in Lika. The family's slava (feast day) is Aranđelovdan. He is related to Bogdan Zimonjić (1813–1909), a Serbian Orthodox priest and guerilla leader.

In 2008, he married former model Mina Knežević. On 3 December 2008 his wife gave birth to twins, Leon and Luna.

== Career statistics ==
=== Grand Slam tournament performance timeline ===
Key
| W | F | SF | QF | #R | RR | Q# | DNQ | A | NH |

(W) winner; (F) finalist; (SF) semifinalist; (QF) quarterfinalist; (#R) rounds 4, 3, 2, 1; (RR) round-robin stage; (Q#) qualification round; (DNQ) did not qualify; (A) absent; (NH) not held; (SR) strike rate (events won / competed); (W–L) win–loss record.
To avoid confusion and double counting, these charts are updated at the conclusion of a tournament or when the player's participation has ended.

==== Doubles ====
| | FR Yugoslavia | | | | | | | | | (Serbia and Montenegro) FRY | | | Serbia | | | | | | | | | | | | | | | | | | |
| Tournament | 1995 | 1996 | 1997 | 1998 | 1999 | 2000 | 2001 | 2002 | 2003 | 2004 | 2005 | 2006 | 2007 | 2008 | 2009 | 2010 | 2011 | 2012 | 2013 | 2014 | 2015 | 2016 | 2017 | 2018 | 2019 | 2020 | 2021 | 2022 | SR | W–L | Win% |
| Australian Open | A | A | A | A | 1R | 1R | SF | 2R | 1R | 2R | 3R | 1R | QF | QF | 2R | F | QF | 3R | 2R | SF | 3R | A | 2R | 1R | A | A | A | A | 0 / 19 | 35–19 | 65% |
| French Open | A | A | A | A | A | 1R | 1R | A | 2R | 2R | QF | 1R | SF | F | SF | W | SF | QF | 2R | QF | QF | 3R | SF | A | A | A | A | A | 1 / 17 | 44–16 | 73% |
| Wimbledon | A | A | A | A | 1R | 1R | 3R | 3R | 3R | F | QF | F | SF | W | W | 2R | SF | 1R | QF | QF | QF | 3R | A | A | A | NH | A | A | 2 / 18 | 51–16 | 76% |
| US Open | A | A | Q2 | A | 3R | 3R | 3R | 3R | 1R | 2R | 1R | QF | 2R | 3R | QF | 3R | 3R | 1R | 2R | 3R | QF | 1R | A | A | A | A | A | A | 0 / 18 | 28–18 | 61% |
| Win–loss | 0–0 | 0–0 | 0–0 | 0–0 | 2–3 | 2–4 | 8–4 | 5–3 | 3–4 | 8–4 | 8–4 | 10–4 | 12–4 | 16–3 | 14–3 | 14–3 | 13–4 | 5–4 | 6–4 | 12–4 | 11–4 | 4–3 | 5–2 | 0–1 | 0–0 | 0–0 | 0–0 | 0–0 | 3 / 72 | 158–69 | 70% |

==== Mixed doubles ====
| Tournament | 1999 | 2000 | 2001 | 2002 | 2003 | 2004 | 2005 | 2006 | 2007 | 2008 | 2009 | 2010 | 2011 | 2012 | 2013 | 2014 | 2015 | 2016 | 2017 | 2018 | 2019 | 2020 | 2021 | 2022 | SR |
|---|---|---|---|---|---|---|---|---|---|---|---|---|---|---|---|---|---|---|---|---|---|---|---|---|---|
| Australian Open | A | A | QF | A | A | W | 2R | 1R | 2R | W | 1R | 1R | SF | A | 2R | 1R | 1R | A | A | A | A | A | A | A | 2 / 12 |
| French Open | A | A | 1R | A | A | SF | 2R | W | F | F | 1R | W | F | 2R | QF | F | 1R | 2R | A | A | A | NH | A | A | 2 / 14 |
| Wimbledon | 2R | 1R | A | 1R | QF | A | 3R | QF | 1R | 2R | 2R | 3R | 3R | SF | SF | W | 3R | 3R | 1R | A | A | NH | A | A | 1 / 17 |
| US Open | A | A | 1R | A | 1R | QF | F | 2R | 1R | QF | QF | 2R | 1R | 1R | 2R | 1R | 2R | SF | 2R | A | A | NH | A | A | 0 / 16 |
| SR | 0 / 1 | 0 / 1 | 0 / 3 | 0 / 1 | 0 / 2 | 1 / 3 | 0 / 4 | 1 / 4 | 0 / 4 | 1 / 4 | 0 / 4 | 1 / 4 | 0 / 4 | 0 / 3 | 0 / 4 | 1 / 4 | 0 / 4 | 0 / 3 | 0 / 2 | 0 / 0 | 0 / 0 | 0 / 0 | 0 / 0 | 0 / 0 | 5 / 59 |

=== Grand Slam doubles finals: 7 (3 titles, 4 runner-ups) ===
| Result | Year | Championship | Surface | Partner | Opponents | Score |
|---|---|---|---|---|---|---|
| Loss | 2004 | Wimbledon | Grass | (Austria) Julian Knowle | (Sweden) Jonas Björkman (Australia) Todd Woodbridge | 1–6, 4–6, 6–4, 4–6 |
| Loss | 2006 | Wimbledon | Grass | (France) Fabrice Santoro | (United States) Bob Bryan (United States) Mike Bryan | 3–6, 6–4, 4–6, 2–6 |
| Loss | 2008 | French Open | Clay | (Canada) Daniel Nestor | (Uruguay) Pablo Cuevas (Peru) Luis Horna | 2–6, 3–6 |
| Win | 2008 | Wimbledon | Grass | (Canada) Daniel Nestor | (Sweden) Jonas Björkman (Zimbabwe) Kevin Ullyett | 7–6^{(14–12)}, 6–7^{(6–8)}, 6–3, 6–3 |
| Win | 2009 | Wimbledon (2) | Grass | (Canada) Daniel Nestor | (United States) Bob Bryan (United States) Mike Bryan | 7–6^{(9–7)}, 6–7^{(3–7)}, 7–6^{(7–3)}, 6–3 |
| Loss | 2010 | Australian Open | Hard | (Canada) Daniel Nestor | (United States) Bob Bryan (United States) Mike Bryan | 3–6, 7–6^{(7–5)}, 3–6 |
| Win | 2010 | French Open | Clay | (Canada) Daniel Nestor | (Czech Republic) Lukáš Dlouhý (India) Leander Paes | 7–5, 6–2 |

=== Grand Slam Mixed doubles finals: 10 (5 titles, 5 runner-ups) ===
| Result | Year | Championship | Surface | Partner | Opponents | Score |
|---|---|---|---|---|---|---|
| Win | 2004 | Australian Open | Hard | (Russia) Elena Bovina | (United States) Martina Navratilova (India) Leander Paes | 6–1, 7–6^{(7–3)} |
| Loss | 2005 | US Open | Hard | (Slovenia) Katarina Srebotnik | (Slovakia) Daniela Hantuchová (India) Mahesh Bhupathi | 4–6, 2–6 |
| Win | 2006 | French Open | Clay | (Slovenia) Katarina Srebotnik | (Russia) Elena Likhovtseva (Canada) Daniel Nestor | 6–3, 6–4 |
| Loss | 2007 | French Open | Clay | (Slovenia) Katarina Srebotnik | (France) Nathalie Dechy (Israel) Andy Ram | 5–7, 3–6 |
| Win | 2008 | Australian Open (2) | Hard | (China) Sun Tiantian | (India) Sania Mirza (India) Mahesh Bhupathi | 7–6^{(7–4)}, 6–4 |
| Loss | 2008 | French Open | Clay | (Slovenia) Katarina Srebotnik | (Belarus) Victoria Azarenka (United States) Bob Bryan | 2–6, 6–7^{(4–7)} |
| Win | 2010 | French Open (2) | Clay | (Slovenia) Katarina Srebotnik | (Kazakhstan) Yaroslava Shvedova (Austria) Julian Knowle | 4–6, 7–6^{(7–5)}, [11–9] |
| Loss | 2011 | French Open | Clay | (Slovenia) Katarina Srebotnik | (Australia) Casey Dellacqua (United States) Scott Lipsky | 6–7^{(6–8)}, 6–4, [7–10] |
| Loss | 2014 | French Open | Clay | (Germany) Julia Görges | (Germany) Anna-Lena Grönefeld (Netherlands) Jean-Julien Rojer | 6–4, 2–6, [7–10] |
| Win | 2014 | Wimbledon | Grass | (Australia) Samantha Stosur | (Chinese Taipei) Chan Hao-ching (Belarus) Max Mirnyi | 6–4, 6–2 |

=== Year–End Championships performance timeline ===
| | FR Yugoslavia | | | | | | | | | (Serbia and Montenegro) FRY | | | Serbia | | | | | | | | | | | | | | | | | | |
| Tournament | 1995 | 1996 | 1997 | 1998 | 1999 | 2000 | 2001 | 2002 | 2003 | 2004 | 2005 | 2006 | 2007 | 2008 | 2009 | 2010 | 2011 | 2012 | 2013 | 2014 | 2015 | 2016 | 2017 | 2018 | 2019 | 2020 | 2021 | 2022 | SR | W–L | Win% |
| ATP Finals | Did not qualify | | | | | | | | | | F | RR | DNQ | W | RR | W | RR | DNQ | | RR | RR | Did not qualify | | | | | | | 2 / 8 | 16–14 | 53% |

=== Year–End Championship doubles finals: 3 (2 titles, 1 runner-up) ===
| Result | Year | Championship | Surface | Partner | Opponents | Score |
|---|---|---|---|---|---|---|
| Loss | 2005 | Shanghai | Hard (i) | (India) Leander Paes | (France) Michaël Llodra (France) Fabrice Santoro | 7–6^{(8–6)}, 3–6, 6–7^{(4–7)} |
| Win | 2008 | Shanghai | Hard (i) | (Canada) Daniel Nestor | (United States) Bob Bryan (United States) Mike Bryan | 7–6^{(7–3)}, 6–2 |
| Win | 2010 | London | Hard (i) | (Canada) Daniel Nestor | (India) Mahesh Bhupathi (Belarus) Max Mirnyi | 7–6^{(8–6)}, 6–4 |

== Awards ==
1994

- Best Male Tennis Player in FR Yugoslavia

1996

- Best Male Tennis Player in FR Yugoslavia

1998

- Best Male Tennis Player in FR Yugoslavia

2001

- Best Male Tennis Player in FR Yugoslavia

2007

- Serbian Sport Association "May Award"

2008

- Year-end No. 1 (with Daniel Nestor)
- ATP Doubles Team of the Year (with Daniel Nestor)
- ITF Men's doubles World Champion (with Daniel Nestor)

2010

- Recognition for 50 matches played for Serbia Davis Cup team

2012

- Award Pride of the Nation by Serbia Tennis Federation
- Davis Cup Commitment Award

2013

- Davis Cup Award of Excellence

== Records ==
| Grand Slam tournaments | Time span | Records at each Grand Slam tournament | Players matched |
|---|---|---|---|
| French Open | 2010 | Won men's doubles and mixed doubles titles at the same tournament | Frew McMillan; Jim Pugh; Rick Leach; John Fitzgerald; Mark Woodforde; Todd Woodbridge; Leander Paes; Mike Bryan; Bob Bryan; Bruno Soares; Mate Pavić; Joe Salisbury |

| Time span | Other selected records | Players matched |
ATP Masters 1000 records
| 2004–2013 | 5 Monte-Carlo Masters titles | Bob Bryan; Mike Bryan |
Davis Cup records
| 1998 | Most games in a singles fifth set vs. Nuno Marques (38) | Richard Ashby; Jose Medrano; Nuno Marques |
| 2013 | Oldest player in Davis Cup World Group Final (37 years, 5 months) | Stands alone |

== See also ==
- Serbia Davis Cup team
- List of male doubles tennis players
- List of ATP number 1 ranked doubles players
- List of Grand Slam men's doubles champions
- List of Grand Slam mixed doubles champions
- ATP Tour records
- Sport in Serbia

Sporting positions
| Preceded by Bob and Mike Bryan; Bob and Mike Bryan; Daniel Nestor; Bob and Mike Bryan; Bob and Mike Bryan | World No. 1 (doubles); November 17, 2008 - February 1, 2009; May 18, 2009 - May 24, 2009; November 2, 2009 - November 29, 2009; February 1, 2010 - May 16, 2010; June 7, 2010 - August 15, 2010 | Succeeded by Bob and Mike Bryan; Daniel Nestor; Bob and Mike Bryan; Bob and Mike Bryan; Bob and Mike Bryan |
Awards
| Preceded by Bob and Mike Bryan | ITF World Champion (doubles) (with Daniel Nestor); 2008 | Succeeded by Bob and Mike Bryan |
| Preceded by Bob and Mike Bryan | ATP Doubles Team of the Year (with Daniel Nestor); 2008 | Succeeded by Bob and Mike Bryan |
