= 2006 French Open – Girls' doubles =

Girls' doubles
- 2006 French Open

Final
- Champion: (Canada) Sharon Fichman (Russia) Anastasia Pavlyuchenkova
- Runner-up: (Poland) Agnieszka Radwańska (Denmark) Caroline Wozniacki
- Score: 6–7^{(4–7)}, 6–2, 6–1

Events
| Singles | men | women | | boys | girls |
| Doubles | men | women | mixed | boys | girls |
| WC Singles | men | women | quad |
| WC Doubles | men | women | quad |
| Legends | −45 | 45+ | women |
- French Open

Victoria Azarenka and Ágnes Szávay were the defending champions, but did not compete in the Juniors that year.

Sharon Fichman and Anastasia Pavlyuchenkova won the title, defeating Agnieszka Radwańska and Caroline Wozniacki in the final, 6–7^{(4–7)}, 6–2, 6–1.

== Seeds ==
1. (Poland) Agnieszka Radwańska / (Denmark) Caroline Wozniacki (final)
2. (Chinese Taipei) Yung-Jan Chan / (Japan) Ayumi Morita (quarterfinals)
3. (Canada) Sharon Fichman / (Russia) Anastasia Pavlyuchenkova (champions)
4. (United States) Julia Cohen / (New Zealand) Sacha Jones (second round)
5. (Romania) Mihaela Buzărnescu / (Romania) Alexandra Dulgheru (semifinals)
6. (Brazil) Teliana Pereira / (Czech Republic) Kateřina Vaňková (first round)
7. (Romania) Raluca Olaru / (Kazakhstan) Amina Rakhim (quarterfinals)
8. (Romania) Sorana Cîrstea / (Russia) Alexandra Panova (semifinals)

== Draw ==
Key

- Q = Qualifier
- WC = Wild card
- LL = Lucky loser
- Alt = Alternate
- ITF = ITF entry
- PR = Protected ranking
- SR = Special ranking
- SE = Special exempt
- JE = Junior exempt
- JR = Junior Accelerator Programme entrant
- CO = College Accelerator Programme entrant
- NG = Next Gen Accelerator Program entrant
- w/o = Walkover
- r = Retired
- d = Defaulted

=== Finals ===
Semifinals
1 | (Poland) Agnieszka Radwańska (Denmark) Caroline Wozniacki | 4 | 6 | 6
5 | (Romania) Mihaela Buzărnescu (Romania) Alexandra Dulgheru | 6 | 4 | 3
3 | (Canada) Sharon Fichman (Russia) Anastasia Pavlyuchenkova | 6 | 6
8 | (Romania) Sorana Cîrstea (Russia) Alexandra Panova | 3 | 4

Final
1 | (Poland) Agnieszka Radwańska (Denmark) Caroline Wozniacki | 7^{7} | 2 | 1
3 | (Canada) Sharon Fichman (Russia) Anastasia Pavlyuchenkova | 6^{4} | 6 | 6

=== Top half ===
First round
1 | (Poland) Agnieszka Radwańska (Denmark) Caroline Wozniacki | 6 | 6
(Australia) Tyra Calderwood (Australia) Jessica Moore | 1 | 2
WC | (France) Nelly Ciolkowski (France) Stéphanie Vongsouthi | 1 | 1
(Russia) Alisa Kleybanova (Russia) Evgeniya Rodina | 6 | 6
(Hong Kong) Venise Chan (Luxembourg) Lynn Philippe | 4 | 6 | 6
(France) Cindy Chala (France) Victoria Larrière | 6 | 2 | 0
(Switzerland) Timea Bacsinszky (Netherlands) Bibiane Schoofs | 5 | 6 | 4
7 | (Romania) Raluca Olaru (Kazakhstan) Amina Rakhim | 7 | 4 | 6
4 | (United States) Julia Cohen (New Zealand) Sacha Jones | 6 | 6
(Austria) Nikola Hofmanova (Uzbekistan) Dilyara Saidkhodjayeva | 3 | 0
(Italy) Andreea-Roxana Vaideanu (Italy) Erika Zanchetta | 2 | 6 | 1
(Netherlands) Marrit Boonstra (Slovakia) Dominika Cibulková | 6 | 2 | 6
(Ukraine) Kristina Antoniychuk (Russia) Anastasia Petukhova | 6 | 6
(France) Adeline Goncalves (France) Charlotte Rodier | 3 | 4
(Bolivia) Maria-Fernanda Alvarez-Teran (Brazil) Ana-Clara Duarte | 1 | 1
5 | (Romania) Mihaela Buzărnescu (Romania) Alexandra Dulgheru | 6 | 6

Second round
1 | (Poland) A Radwańska (Denmark) C Wozniacki | 7^{7} | 2 | 7
(Russia) A Kleybanova (Russia) E Rodina | 6^{4} | 6 | 5
(Hong Kong) V Chan (Luxembourg) L Philippe | 3 | 0
7 | (Romania) R Olaru (Kazakhstan) A Rakhim | 6 | 6
4 | (United States) J Cohen (New Zealand) S Jones | 3 | 3
(Netherlands) M Boonstra (Slovakia) D Cibulková | 6 | 6
(Ukraine) K Antoniychuk (Russia) A Petukhova | 3 | 2
5 | (Romania) M Buzărnescu (Romania) A Dulgheru | 6 | 6

Quarterfinals
1 | (Poland) A Radwańska (Denmark) C Wozniacki | 6 | 6
7 | (Romania) R Olaru (Kazakhstan) A Rakhim | 2 | 4
(Netherlands) M Boonstra (Slovakia) D Cibulková | 4 | 1
5 | (Romania) M Buzărnescu (Romania) A Dulgheru | 6 | 6

Semifinals
1 | (Poland) A Radwańska (Denmark) C Wozniacki | 4 | 6 | 6
5 | (Romania) M Buzărnescu (Romania) A Dulgheru | 6 | 4 | 3

=== Bottom half ===
First round
6 | (Brazil) Teliana Pereira (Czech Republic) Kateřina Vaňková | 6^{4} | 2
(Russia) Ekaterina Makarova (Russia) Anastasia Pivovarova | 7^{7} | 6
(United States) Lauren Albanese (United States) Kimberly Couts
(Netherlands) Marlot Meddens (Netherlands) Anouk Tigu | w/o
(Sweden) Johanna Larsson (Belgium) Yanina Wickmayer | 6 | 2 | 6
(France) Alizé Cornet (Italy) Corinna Dentoni | 3 | 6 | 4
(Slovakia) Kristína Kučová (Slovakia) Michaela Pochabová | 3 | 4
3 | (Canada) Sharon Fichman (Russia) Anastasia Pavlyuchenkova | 6 | 6
8 | (Romania) Sorana Cîrstea (Russia) Alexandra Panova | 6 | 2 | 6
(Belarus) Ksenia Milevskaya (Brazil) Roxane Vaisemberg | 1 | 6 | 2
(Philippines) Denise Dy (Hong Kong) Ling Zhang | 4 | 6^{1}
(Kyrgyzstan) Ksenia Palkina (Germany) Dominice Ripoll | 6 | 7^{7}
(India) Sanaa Bhambri (Russia) Maya Gaverova
(France) Gracia Radovanovic (Serbia and Montenegro) Nataša Zorić | w/o
(Austria) Melanie Klaffner (Mexico) Valeria Pulido | 4 | 6 | 13
2 | (Chinese Taipei) Yung-Jan Chan (Japan) Ayumi Morita | 6 | 3 | 15

Second round
(Russia) E Makarova (Russia) A Pivovarova | 6 | 4 | 2
(Netherlands) M Meddens (Netherlands) A Tigu | 2 | 6 | 6
(Sweden) J Larsson (Belgium) Y Wickmayer | 1 | 6 | 4
3 | (Canada) S Fichman (Russia) A Pavlyuchenkova | 6 | 1 | 6
8 | (Romania) S Cîrstea (Russia) A Panova | 4 | 6 | 7
(Kyrgyzstan) K Palkina (Germany) D Ripoll | 6 | 1 | 5
(France) G Radovanovic (Serbia and Montenegro) N Zorić | 2 | 2
2 | (Chinese Taipei) Y-J Chan (Japan) A Morita | 6 | 6

Quarterfinals
(Netherlands) M Meddens (Netherlands) A Tigu | 2 | 4
3 | (Canada) S Fichman (Russia) A Pavlyuchenkova | 6 | 6
8 | (Romania) S Cîrstea (Russia) A Panova | 7^{7} | 6
2 | (Chinese Taipei) Y-J Chan (Japan) A Morita | 6^{1} | 2

Semifinals
3 | (Canada) S Fichman (Russia) A Pavlyuchenkova | 6 | 6
8 | (Romania) S Cîrstea (Russia) A Panova | 3 | 4

== Sources ==
- Draw
