= 2006 French Open – Women's singles =

Women's singles
- 2006 French Open

Final
- Champion: (Belgium) Justine Henin-Hardenne
- Runner-up: (Russia) Svetlana Kuznetsova
- Score: 6–4, 6–4

Details
- Seeds: 32

Events
Singles	men	women		boys	girls
Doubles	men	women	mixed	boys	girls
WC Singles	men	women	quad
WC Doubles	men	women	quad
Legends	−45	45+	women
← 2005 ·	French Open	· 2007 →

Defending champion Justine Henin-Hardenne defeated Svetlana Kuznetsova in the final, 6–4, 6–4 to win the women's singles tennis title at the 2006 French Open. It was her third French Open title and fifth major title overall. Henin-Hardenne did not lose a set during the tournament, and did not face a tiebreak in any set.

This was the first French Open main draw appearance for future champion and world No. 2 Li Na, who lost in the third round to Svetlana Kuznetsova.

== Seeds ==
1. (France) Amélie Mauresmo (fourth round)
2. (Belgium) Kim Clijsters (semifinals)
3. (Russia) Nadia Petrova (first round)
4. (Russia) Maria Sharapova (fourth round)
5. (Belgium) Justine Henin-Hardenne (champion)
6. (Russia) Elena Dementieva (third round)
7. (Switzerland) Patty Schnyder (fourth round)
8. (Russia) Svetlana Kuznetsova (final)
9. (Italy) Francesca Schiavone (fourth round)
10. (Russia) Anastasia Myskina (fourth round)
11. (United States) Venus Williams (quarterfinals)
12. (Switzerland) Martina Hingis (quarterfinals)
13. (Germany) Anna-Lena Grönefeld (quarterfinals)
14. (Russia) Dinara Safina (quarterfinals)
15. (Slovakia) Daniela Hantuchová (fourth round)
16. (Czech Republic) Nicole Vaidišová (semifinals)
17. (Italy) Flavia Pennetta (third round)
18. (Russia) Elena Likhovtseva (first round)
19. (Serbia and Montenegro) Ana Ivanovic (third round)
20. (Russia) Maria Kirilenko (third round)
21. (France) Nathalie Dechy (third round)
22. (Japan) Ai Sugiyama (second round)
23. (France) Tatiana Golovin (first round)
24. (Slovenia) Katarina Srebotnik (third round)
25. (France) Marion Bartoli (second round)
26. (Spain) Anabel Medina Garrigues (third round)
27. (Russia) Anna Chakvetadze (second round)
28. (Czech Republic) Lucie Šafářová (first round)
29. (Sweden) Sofia Arvidsson (second round)
30. (Czech Republic) Klára Koukalová (first round)
31. (Israel) Shahar Pe'er (fourth round)
32. (Argentina) Gisela Dulko (fourth round)

== Draw ==
=== Key ===
- Q = Qualifier
- WC = Wild card
- LL = Lucky loser
- Alt = Alternate
- ITF = ITF entry
- PR = Protected ranking
- SR = Special ranking
- SE = Special exempt
- JE = Junior exempt
- JR = Junior Accelerator Programme entrant
- CO = College Accelerator Programme entrant
- NG = Next Gen Accelerator Program entrant
- w/o = Walkover
- r = Retired
- d = Defaulted

=== Finals ===
Quarterfinals
16	(Czech Republic) Nicole Vaidišová	6^{5}	6	6
11	(United States) Venus Williams	7^{7}	1	3
14	(Russia) Dinara Safina	6^{5}	0
8	(Russia) Svetlana Kuznetsova	7^{7}	6
5	(Belgium) Justine Henin-Hardenne	7	6
13	(Germany) Anna-Lena Grönefeld	5	2
12	(Switzerland) Martina Hingis	6^{5}	1
2	(Belgium) Kim Clijsters	7^{7}	6

Semifinals
16	(Czech Republic) Nicole Vaidišová	7	6^{5}	2
8	(Russia) Svetlana Kuznetsova	5	7^{7}	6
5	(Belgium) Justine Henin-Hardenne	6	6
2	(Belgium) Kim Clijsters	3	2

Final
8	(Russia) Svetlana Kuznetsova	4	4
5	(Belgium) Justine Henin-Hardenne	6	6

=== Top half ===
==== Section 1 ====
First round
1	(France) A Mauresmo	6	6
(United States) M Shaughnessy	4	4
(Russia) A Rodionova	3	2
(Russia) V Dushevina	6	6
(Spain) L Pous Tió	5	4
(Serbia and Montenegro) J Janković	7	6
WC	(France) A Védy	1	0
25	(France) M Bartoli	6	6
22	(Japan) A Sugiyama	6^{1}	6	6
(Greece) E Daniilidou	7^{7}	0	3
Q	(France) A Rezaï	6	7^{7}
Q	(Italy) A Brianti	4	6^{1}
(China) T Sun	6	7
(Russia) E Bychkova	2	5
(Poland) M Domachowska	1	3
16	(Czech Republic) N Vaidišová	6	6

Second round
1	(France) A Mauresmo	6	7^{7}
(Russia) V Dushevina	1	6^{5}
(Serbia and Montenegro) J Janković	2	6	6
25	(France) M Bartoli	6	4	1
22	(Japan) A Sugiyama	6	4	3
Q	(France) A Rezaï	4	6	6
(China) T Sun	1	3
16	(Czech Republic) N Vaidišová	6	6

Third round
1	(France) A Mauresmo	6	6
(Serbia and Montenegro) J Janković	3	3
Q	(France) A Rezaï	1	7^{8}	0
16	(Czech Republic) N Vaidišová	6	6^{6}	6

Fourth round
1	(France) A Mauresmo	7^{7}	1	2
16	(Czech Republic) N Vaidišová	6^{5}	6	6

==== Section 2 ====
First round
11	(United States) V Williams	6	6
(Austria) S Bammer	4	3
WC	(France) Y Fedossova	6	6^{2}	2
(Finland) E Laine	4	7^{7}	6
(China) S Peng	6	6
(Russia) E Vesnina	2	2
(Croatia) K Šprem	6	6
18	(Russia) E Likhovtseva	1	1
29	(Sweden) S Arvidsson	6	6
(Venezuela) M Vento-Kabchi	4	2
(China) M Yuan	1	2
Q	(Ukraine) J Vakulenko	6	6
(Slovakia) J Gajdošová	6	5	6
WC	(France) S Cohen-Aloro	2	7	3
(Netherlands) M Krajicek	1	2
7	(Switzerland) P Schnyder	6	6

Second round
11	(United States) V Williams	7^{7}	6
(Finland) E Laine	6^{2}	2
(China) S Peng	4	3^{r}
(Croatia) K Šprem	6	4
29	(Sweden) S Arvidsson	1	5
Q	(Ukraine) J Vakulenko	6	7
(Slovakia) J Gajdošová	4	2
7	(Switzerland) P Schnyder	6	6

Third round
11	(United States) V Williams	7	6
(Croatia) K Šprem	5	3
Q	(Ukraine) J Vakulenko	6	5	0
7	(Switzerland) P Schnyder	2	7	6

Fourth round
11	(United States) V Williams	4	6	6
7	(Switzerland) P Schnyder	6	3	2

==== Section 3 ====
First round
4	(Russia) M Sharapova	6	5	7
(United States) M Washington	2	7	5
(Czech Republic) I Benešová	7	6
WC	(France) P Parmentier	5	3
WC	(Australia) A Molik	7	7^{7}
(Italy) A Serra Zanetti	5	6^{3}
Q	(Romania) A Perianu	6	7^{9}
28	(Czech Republic) L Šafářová	1	6^{7}
24	(Slovenia) K Srebotnik	6	4	6
(Israel) A Smashnova	4	6	2
(Croatia) J Kostanić	5	6	5
(United States) A Harkleroad	7	2	7
(Czech Republic) H Šromová	6	7
(Italy) R Vinci	1	5
(Russia) V Zvonareva	3	5
14	(Russia) D Safina	6	7

Second round
4	(Russia) M Sharapova	6	6
(Czech Republic) I Benešová	4	1
WC	(Australia) A Molik	3	7^{7}	6
Q	(Romania) A Perianu	6	6^{5}	3
24	(Slovenia) K Srebotnik	6	6
(United States) A Harkleroad	3	2
(Czech Republic) H Šromová	0	2
14	(Russia) D Safina	6	6

Third round
4	(Russia) M Sharapova	6	7
WC	(Australia) A Molik	0	5
24	(Slovenia) K Srebotnik	3	4
14	(Russia) D Safina	6	6

Fourth round
4	(Russia) M Sharapova	5	6	5
14	(Russia) D Safina	7	2	7

==== Section 4 ====
First round
9	(Italy) F Schiavone	6	6
(Ukraine) A Bondarenko	3	4
(Italy) N Viérin	6	4	0^{r}
(Germany) M Müller	4	6	3
Q	(France) V Pichet	2	3
LL	(Belgium) K Flipkens	6	6
(United States) B Mattek	3	1
17	(Italy) F Pennetta	6	6
27	(Russia) A Chakvetadze	7	6
Q	(Czech Republic) E Birnerová	5	4
(China) N Li	7^{7}	4	6
(United States) A Frazier	6^{5}	6	1
(Spain) A Parra Santonja	4	1
(Italy) M Santangelo	6	6
(United States) L Granville	4	0
8	(Russia) S Kuznetsova	6	6

Second round
9	(Italy) F Schiavone	6	6
(Germany) M Müller	2	2
LL	(Belgium) K Flipkens	1	0
17	(Italy) F Pennetta	6	6
27	(Russia) A Chakvetadze	5	3
(China) N Li	7	6
(Italy) M Santangelo	5	2
8	(Russia) S Kuznetsova	7	6

Third round
9	(Italy) F Schiavone	4	6	9
17	(Italy) F Pennetta	6	1	7
(China) N Li	3	6^{4}
8	(Russia) S Kuznetsova	6	7^{7}

Fourth round
9	(Italy) F Schiavone	6	4	4
8	(Russia) S Kuznetsova	1	6	6

=== Bottom half ===
==== Section 5 ====
First round
5	(Belgium) J Henin-Hardenne	6	6
(Estonia) M Ani	3	0
(United States) J Craybas	4	7	3
(Belarus) A Yakimova	6	5	6
WC	(France) A Cornet	6	4	6
(Spain) V Ruano Pascual	4	6	1
(Italy) T Garbin	2	6	6
30	(Czech Republic) K Koukalová	6	4	1
19	(Serbia and Montenegro) A Ivanovic	6	6
(Australia) S Stosur	0	3
Q	(Argentina) C Fernández	6	2	3
(France) É Loit	1	6	6
(Hungary) M Czink	6	4	6
Q	(Germany) S Klösel	4	6	2
(India) S Mirza	4	1
10	(Russia) A Myskina	6	6

Second round
5	(Belgium) J Henin-Hardenne	6	7
(Belarus) A Yakimova	2	5
WC	(France) A Cornet	2	4
(Italy) T Garbin	6	6
19	(Serbia and Montenegro) A Ivanovic	6	6
(France) É Loit	1	1
(Hungary) M Czink	2	4
10	(Russia) A Myskina	6	6

Third round
5	(Belgium) J Henin-Hardenne	6	6
(Italy) T Garbin	4	0
19	(Serbia and Montenegro) A Ivanovic	2	3
10	(Russia) A Myskina	6	6

Fourth round
5	(Belgium) J Henin-Hardenne	6	6
10	(Russia) A Myskina	1	4

==== Section 6 ====
First round
13	(Germany) A-L Grönefeld	6	6
(France) C Pin	1	1
(China) Z Yan	2	3
(United States) J Jackson	6	6
Q	(Chinese Taipei) S-w Hsieh	4	4
WC	(France) M Johansson	6	6
WC	(France) S Brémond	6	2	6
20	(Russia) M Kirilenko	1	6	8
32	(Argentina) G Dulko	6	2	11
Q	(Ukraine) Y Beygelzimer	3	6	9
(Puerto Rico) K Brandi	2	3
(Ukraine) Y Fedak	6	6
(United States) S Perry	6	6
(Japan) S Asagoe	3	1
(Japan) A Morigami	6	6
3	(Russia) N Petrova	2	2

Second round
13	(Germany) A-L Grönefeld	6^{8}	6	6
(United States) J Jackson	7^{10}	2	1
WC	(France) M Johansson	0	1
20	(Russia) M Kirilenko	6	6
32	(Argentina) G Dulko	6	6
(Ukraine) Y Fedak	2	4
(United States) S Perry	6	6
(Japan) A Morigami	3	0

Third round
13	(Germany) A-L Grönefeld	6	7^{7}
20	(Russia) M Kirilenko	2	6^{2}
32	(Argentina) G Dulko	6	6
(United States) S Perry	1	1

Fourth round
13	(Germany) A-L Grönefeld	6	6
32	(Argentina) G Dulko	3	4

==== Section 7 ====
First round
6	(Russia) E Dementieva	7^{7}	6
(Slovakia) M Suchá	6^{3}	2
(Ukraine) V Kutuzova	7^{13}	6
(United States) V King	6^{11}	2
(Spain) M Sánchez Lorenzo	3	2
(Bulgaria) T Pironkova	6	6
(Ukraine) O Savchuk	1	1
31	(Israel) S Pe'er	6	6
23	(France) T Golovin	3	6^{5}
(China) J Zheng	6	7^{7}
(Croatia) I Lisjak	6	6
Q	(Russia) G Voskoboeva	2	3
(Germany) J Schruff	4	2
(Czech Republic) Z Ondrášková	6	6
(United States) L Raymond	2	2
12	(Switzerland) M Hingis	6	6

Second round
6	(Russia) E Dementieva	3	6	6
(Ukraine) V Kutuzova	6	0	4
(Bulgaria) T Pironkova	2	3
31	(Israel) S Pe'er	6	6
(China) J Zheng	4	4
(Croatia) I Lisjak	6	6
(Czech Republic) Z Ondrášková	1	3
12	(Switzerland) M Hingis	6	6

Third round
6	(Russia) E Dementieva	4	5
31	(Israel) S Pe'er	6	7
(Croatia) I Lisjak	1	1
12	(Switzerland) M Hingis	6	6

Fourth round
31	(Israel) S Pe'er	3	6	3
12	(Switzerland) M Hingis	6	2	6

==== Section 8 ====
First round
15	(Slovakia) D Hantuchová	6	6
(Spain) L Domínguez Lino	1	4
(Italy) ME Camerin	4	2
(Switzerland) E Gagliardi	6	6
(Colombia) C Castaño	4	6	6
(Japan) A Nakamura	6	3	1
(France) S Foretz	2	6	3
21	(France) N Dechy	6	3	6
26	(Spain) A Medina Garrigues	0	6	9
Q	(Belarus) V Azarenka	6	3	7
(Estonia) K Kanepi	6	6
(Czech Republic) K Peschke	2	3
(Argentina) M Díaz Oliva	4	6	1
(Spain) C Martínez Granados	6	3	6
(France) V Razzano	0	6^{4}
2	(Belgium) K Clijsters	6	7^{7}

Second round
15	(Slovakia) D Hantuchová	3	6	6
(Switzerland) E Gagliardi	6	2	3
(Colombia) C Castaño	4	6	3
21	(France) N Dechy	6	2	6
26	(Spain) A Medina Garrigues	6	4	6
(Estonia) K Kanepi	3	6	0
(Spain) C Martínez Granados	0	3
2	(Belgium) K Clijsters	6	6

Third round
15	(Slovakia) D Hantuchová	6	3	10
21	(France) N Dechy	3	6	8
26	(Spain) A Medina Garrigues	3	4
2	(Belgium) K Clijsters	6	6

Fourth round
15	(Slovakia) D Hantuchová	1	4
2	(Belgium) K Clijsters	6	6

== Championship match statistics ==
Category	(Belgium) Henin-Hardenne	(Russia) Kuznetsova
1st serve %	33/65 (51%)	48/68 (71%)
1st serve points won	25 of 33 = 76%	29 of 48 = 60%
2nd serve points won	14 of 32 = 44%	9 of 20 = 45%
Total service points won	39 of 65 = 60.00%	38 of 68 = 55.88%
Aces	4	0
Double faults	3	3
Winners	12	17
Unforced errors	30	35
Net points won	5 of 5 = 100%	11 of 13 = 85%
Break points converted	4 of 7 = 57%	2 of 2 = 50%
Return points won	30 of 68 = 44%	26 of 65 = 40%
Total points won	69	54

Preceded by 2006 Australian Open – Women's singles	Grand Slam women's singles	Succeeded by 2006 Wimbledon Championships – Women's singles
