= 2006 French Open – Men's doubles =

Men's doubles
- 2006 French Open

Final
- Champion: (Sweden) Jonas Björkman (Belarus) Max Mirnyi
- Runner-up: (United States) Bob Bryan (United States) Mike Bryan
- Score: 6–7^{(7–5)}, 6–4, 7–5

Details
- Draw: 64
- Seeds: 16

Events
Singles	men	women		boys	girls
Doubles	men	women	mixed	boys	girls
WC Singles	men	women	quad
WC Doubles	men	women	quad
Legends	−45	45+	women
- French Open

Defending champions Jonas Björkman and Max Mirnyi defeated Bob and Mike Bryan in a rematch of the previous year's final, 6–7^{(7–5)}, 6–4, 7–5 to win the men's doubles tennis title at the 2006 French Open. It was Björkman's ninth and final major title.

== Schedule ==
Round	Dates
First round	31 May and 1 June 2006
Second round	2 June and 3 June 2006
Third round	4 June 2006
Quarterfinals	5 June and 6 June 2006
Semifinals	8 June 2006
Final	10 June 2006

== Seeds ==
1. (United States) Bob Bryan / (United States) Mike Bryan (finals)
2. (Sweden) Jonas Björkman / (Belarus) Max Mirnyi (champions)
3. (The Bahamas) Mark Knowles / (Canada) Daniel Nestor (second round)
4. (Australia) Paul Hanley / (Zimbabwe) Kevin Ullyett (second round)
5. (Israel) Jonathan Erlich / (Israel) Andy Ram (second round)
6. (France) Fabrice Santoro / (Serbia and Montenegro) Nenad Zimonjić (first round)
7. (Czech Republic) Martin Damm / (India) Leander Paes (first round)
8. (Sweden) Simon Aspelin / (Australia) Todd Perry (second round)
9. (Poland) Mariusz Fyrstenberg / (Poland) Marcin Matkowski (second round)
10. (Czech Republic) František Čermák / (Czech Republic) Leoš Friedl (second round)
11. (Austria) Julian Knowle / (Austria) Jürgen Melzer (third round)
12. (Argentina) José Acasuso / (Argentina) Sebastián Prieto (second round)
13. (Czech Republic) Lukáš Dlouhý / (Czech Republic) Pavel Vízner (semifinals)
14. (France) Michaël Llodra / (Belgium) Olivier Rochus (third round)
15. (Romania) Andrei Pavel / (Germany) Alexander Waske (semifinals)
16. (Sweden) Thomas Johansson / (South Africa) Wesley Moodie (second round)
- Only six seeds made it past the second round.

== Draw ==
=== Finals ===
Quarterfinals
1	(United States) Bob Bryan (United States) Mike Bryan	6	6
(France) Julien Benneteau (France) Nicolas Mahut	3	1
15	(Romania) Andrei Pavel (Germany) Alexander Waske	2	6	6
(India) Mahesh Bhupathi (Belgium) Xavier Malisse	6	2	1
(Austria) Alexander Peya (Germany) Björn Phau	6^{4}	6^{3}
13	(Czech Republic) Lukáš Dlouhý (Czech Republic) Pavel Vízner	7	7
(Spain) Alberto Martín (Italy) Potito Starace
2	(Sweden) Jonas Björkman (Belarus) Max Mirnyi	w/o

Semifinals
1	(United States) Bob Bryan (United States) Mike Bryan	6	7
15	(Romania) Andrei Pavel (Germany) Alexander Waske	3	6^{6}
13	(Czech Republic) Lukáš Dlouhý (Czech Republic) Pavel Vízner	3	3
2	(Sweden) Jonas Björkman (Belarus) Max Mirnyi	6	6

Final
1	(United States) Bob Bryan (United States) Mike Bryan	7	4	5
2	(Sweden) Jonas Björkman (Belarus) Max Mirnyi	6^{5}	6	7

=== Top half ===
==== Section 1 ====
First round
1	(United States) B Bryan (United States) M Bryan	6	6
(Italy) D Sanguinetti (Italy) A Seppi	3	1
Alt	(United Kingdom) J Auckland (United Kingdom) A Murray	6	6
(Australia) A Fisher (Australia) J Kerr	2	4
(Czech Republic) T Berdych (Czech Republic) J Novák	2	2
(Croatia) I Ljubičić (Italy) U Vico	6	6
(Italy) G Galimberti (Thailand) P Srichaphan	6^{3}	3
16	(Sweden) T Johansson (South Africa) W Moodie	7	6
10	(Czech Republic) F Čermák (Czech Republic) L Friedl	6	6
(Australia) N Healey (United States) J Thomas	4	3
WC	(France) T Ascione (France) F Serra	3	0
(France) J Benneteau (France) N Mahut	6	6
(Sweden) J Landsberg (Sweden) R Söderling	2	r
(Czech Republic) J Hernych (Czech Republic) D Škoch	6
(Serbia and Montenegro) J Tipsarević (Russia) M Youzhny	6	7
7	(Czech Republic) M Damm (India) L Paes	1	6^{4}

Second round
1	(United States) B Bryan (United States) M Bryan	6	6
Alt	(United Kingdom) J Auckland (United Kingdom) A Murray	1	3
(Croatia) I Ljubičić (Italy) U Vico	7	6
16	(Sweden) T Johansson (South Africa) W Moodie	5	0
10	(Czech Republic) F Čermák (Czech Republic) L Friedl	6^{9}	4
(France) J Benneteau (France) N Mahut	7	6
(Czech Republic) J Hernych (Czech Republic) D Škoch	5	4
(Serbia and Montenegro) J Tipsarević (Russia) M Youzhny	7	6

Third round
1	(United States) B Bryan (United States) M Bryan	6	6
(Croatia) I Ljubičić (Italy) U Vico	3	4
(France) J Benneteau (France) N Mahut	3	6	6
(Serbia and Montenegro) J Tipsarević (Russia) M Youzhny	6	3	2

Quarterfinals
1	(United States) B Bryan (United States) M Bryan	6	6
(France) J Benneteau (France) N Mahut	3	1

==== Section 2 ====
First round
4	(Australia) P Hanley (Zimbabwe) K Ullyett	6	3	6
(Spain) F López (Spain) F Verdasco	2	6	3
(United States) T Parrott (United States) V Spadea	6	6^{15}	8
(Czech Republic) T Cibulec (Czech Republic) J Levinský	3	7	6
WC	(France) J-F Bachelot (France) S Robert	7	7
WC	(France) G Carraz (France) A Dupuis	6^{5}	5
(South Africa) J Coetzee (United States) J Gimelstob	4	6^{3}
15	(Romania) A Pavel (Germany) A Waske	6	7
12	(Argentina) J Acasuso (Argentina) S Prieto	6	6
(United States) T Phillips (Russia) D Tursunov	4	4
(India) M Bhupathi (Belgium) X Malisse	6	6
(Luxembourg) G Müller (Belgium) C Rochus	2	2
(Switzerland) Y Allegro (Switzerland) S Wawrinka	1	6	6
(Argentina) JI Chela (Argentina) E Massa	6	1	3
(Italy) D Bracciali (Italy) F Volandri	3	4
5	(Israel) J Erlich (Israel) A Ram	6	6

Second round
4	(Australia) P Hanley (Zimbabwe) K Ullyett	6^{4}	6	10
(United States) T Parrott (United States) V Spadea	7	4	12
WC	(France) J-F Bachelot (France) S Robert	1	3
15	(Romania) A Pavel (Germany) A Waske	6	6
12	(Argentina) J Acasuso (Argentina) S Prieto	4	3
(India) M Bhupathi (Belgium) X Malisse	6	6
(Switzerland) Y Allegro (Switzerland) S Wawrinka	6	7
5	(Israel) J Erlich (Israel) A Ram	4	6^{3}

Third round
(United States) T Parrott (United States) V Spadea	3	3
15	(Romania) A Pavel (Germany) A Waske	6	6
(India) M Bhupathi (Belgium) X Malisse	6	6
(Switzerland) Y Allegro (Switzerland) S Wawrinka	3	1

Quarterfinals
15	(Romania) A Pavel (Germany) A Waske	2	6	6
(India) M Bhupathi (Belgium) X Malisse	6	2	1

=== Bottom half ===
==== Section 3 ====
First round
6	(France) F Santoro (Serbia and Montenegro) N Zimonjić	5	5
(Austria) A Peya (Germany) B Phau	7	7
(France) P-H Mathieu (France) G Monfils	3	6	3
(Czech Republic) P Pála (Czech Republic) R Vik	6	3	6
WC	(France) N Devilder (France) O Patience	5	7	6
(Belgium) K Vliegen (Netherlands) R Wassen	7	6^{2}	8
(Spain) D Ferrer (Spain) F Vicente	2	2
11	(Austria) J Knowle (Austria) J Melzer	6	6
13	(Czech Republic) L Dlouhý (Czech Republic) P Vízner	4	7	6
(Germany) C Kas (Germany) P Petzschner	6	6^{3}	4
WC	(France) M Gicquel (Czech Republic) G Simon	4	4
(Austria) O Marach (Czech Republic) C Suk	6	6
(Slovakia) D Hrbatý (Slovakia) M Mertiňák	6	2	8
(United Kingdom) G Rusedski (Czech Republic) T Zíb	1	6	6
(South Africa) C Haggard (Croatia) I Karlović	2	6^{4}
3	(The Bahamas) M Knowles (Canada) D Nestor	6	7

Second round
(Austria) A Peya (Germany) B Phau	6	7
(Czech Republic) P Pála (Czech Republic) R Vik	3	6^{3}
(Belgium) K Vliegen (Netherlands) R Wassen	3	1
11	(Austria) J Knowle (Austria) J Melzer	6	6
13	(Czech Republic) L Dlouhý (Czech Republic) P Vízner	6	7
(Austria) O Marach (Czech Republic) C Suk	4	6^{6}
(Slovakia) D Hrbatý (Slovakia) M Mertiňák	6	6
3	(The Bahamas) M Knowles (Canada) D Nestor	4	3

Third round
(Austria) A Peya (Germany) B Phau	w/o
11	(Austria) J Knowle (Austria) J Melzer
13	(Czech Republic) L Dlouhý (Czech Republic) P Vízner	6	7
(Slovakia) D Hrbatý (Slovakia) M Mertiňák	4	6^{5}

Quarterfinals
(Austria) A Peya (Germany) B Phau	6^{4}	6^{3}
13	(Czech Republic) L Dlouhý (Czech Republic) P Vízner	7	7

==== Section 4 ====
First round
8	(Sweden) S Aspelin (Australia) T Perry	6
(Argentina) JM del Potro (Argentina) G Gaudio	3	r
(Germany) M Kohlmann (Germany) R Schüttler	2	1
(Spain) A Martín (Italy) P Starace	6	6
WC	(France) J Haehnel (France) A Sidorenko	7	3	6
(Serbia and Montenegro) N Djokovic (Croatia) L Zovko	5	6	4
(Serbia and Montenegro) B Pašanski (United States) B Reynolds	4	6	6
9	(Poland) M Fyrstenberg (Poland) M Matkowski	6	4	8
14	(France) M Llodra (Belgium) O Rochus	6	6
(Australia) W Arthurs (Australia) L Hewitt	1	1
(Spain) N Almagro (Spain) A Portas	6	6
(Argentina) L Arnold Ker (Argentina) M García	3	4
WC	(France) J Chardy (France) J Ouanna	4	6	5
(Australia) S Huss (Israel) H Levy	6	2	7
(Sweden) R Lindstedt (Finland) J Nieminen	3	3
2	(Sweden) J Björkman (Belarus) M Mirnyi	6	6

Second round
8	(Sweden) S Aspelin (Australia) T Perry	4	4
(Spain) A Martín (Italy) P Starace	6	6
WC	(France) J Haehnel (France) A Sidorenko	7	7
9	(Poland) M Fyrstenberg (Poland) M Matkowski	6^{4}	6^{3}
14	(France) M Llodra (Belgium) O Rochus	w/o
(Spain) N Almagro (Spain) A Portas
(Australia) S Huss (Israel) H Levy	1	2
2	(Sweden) J Björkman (Belarus) M Mirnyi	6	6

Third round
(Spain) A Martín (Italy) P Starace	6	6
WC	(France) J Haehnel (France) A Sidorenko	3	2
14	(France) M Llodra (Belgium) O Rochus	6^{3}	4
2	(Sweden) J Björkman (Belarus) M Mirnyi	7	6

Quarterfinals
(Spain) A Martín (Italy) P Starace
2	(Sweden) J Björkman (Belarus) M Mirnyi	w/o
