= 2006 French Open – Women's doubles =

Women's doubles
- 2006 French Open

Final
- Champion: (United States) Lisa Raymond (Australia) Samantha Stosur
- Runner-up: (Slovakia) Daniela Hantuchová (Japan) Ai Sugiyama
- Score: 6–3, 6–2

Details
- Draw: 64 (7 WC )
- Seeds: 16

Events
Singles	men	women		boys	girls
Doubles	men	women	mixed	boys	girls
WC Singles	men	women	quad
WC Doubles	men	women	quad
Legends	−45	45+	women
← 2005 ·	French Open	· 2007 →

Virginia Ruano Pascual and Paola Suárez were the two-time defending champions, but they were defeated in the second round by Anna Chakvetadze and Elena Vesnina.

Lisa Raymond and Samantha Stosur won the title, defeating Daniela Hantuchová and Ai Sugiyama in the final 6–3, 6–2. With the victory, Raymond completed the career Grand Slam in Women's Doubles.

== Schedule ==
Round	Dates
First round	May 30, May 31 and June 1, 2006
Second round	June 2 and June 3, 2006
Third round	June 4 and June 5, 2006
Quarterfinals	June 7, 2006
Semifinals	June 9, 2006
Final	June 11, 2006

== Seeds ==
1. (United States) Lisa Raymond / (Australia) Samantha Stosur (champions)
2. (Zimbabwe) Cara Black / (Australia) Rennae Stubbs (quarterfinals)
3. (Germany) Anna-Lena Grönefeld / (United States) Meghann Shaughnessy (second round)
4. (China) Yan Zi / (China) Zheng Jie (semifinals)
5. (Slovakia) Daniela Hantuchová / (Japan) Ai Sugiyama (final)
6. (Japan) Shinobu Asagoe / (Slovenia) Katarina Srebotnik (first round)
7. (South Africa) Liezel Huber / (United States) Martina Navratilova (second round)
8. (Spain) Virginia Ruano Pascual / (Argentina) Paola Suárez (second round)
9. (Russia) Elena Dementieva / (Italy) Flavia Pennetta (second round)
10. (Czech Republic) Květa Peschke / (Italy) Francesca Schiavone (quarterfinals)
11. (Argentina) Gisela Dulko / (Russia) Maria Kirilenko (third round)
12. (France) Émilie Loit / (Australia) Nicole Pratt (first round)
13. (Russia) Elena Likhovtseva / (Russia) Anastasia Myskina (third round)
14. (China) Li Ting / (China) Sun Tiantian (second round)
15. (Greece) Eleni Daniilidou / (Spain) Anabel Medina Garrigues (semifinals)
16. (Russia) Dinara Safina / (Italy) Roberta Vinci (third round)

== Draw ==
=== Key ===
- Q = Qualifier
- WC = Wild card
- LL = Lucky loser
- Alt = Alternate
- ITF = ITF entry
- PR = Protected ranking
- SR = Special ranking
- SE = Special exempt
- JE = Junior exempt
- JR = Junior Accelerator Programme entrant
- CO = College Accelerator Programme entrant
- NG = Next Gen Accelerator Program entrant
- w/o = Walkover
- r = Retired
- d = Defaulted

=== Finals ===
Quarterfinals
1	(United States) Lisa Raymond (Australia) Samantha Stosur	6^{5}	6	6
10	(Czech Republic) Květa Peschke (Italy) Francesca Schiavone	7	1	0
15	(Greece) Eleni Daniilidou (Spain) Anabel Medina Garrigues	6	6
(France) Nathalie Dechy (Russia) Vera Zvonareva	1	4
(Russia) Anna Chakvetadze (Russia) Elena Vesnina	6	2	1
4	(China) Yan Zi (China) Zheng Jie	4	6	6
5	(Slovakia) Daniela Hantuchová (Japan) Ai Sugiyama	6	7
2	(Zimbabwe) Cara Black (Australia) Rennae Stubbs	1	6^{5}

Semifinals
1	(United States) Lisa Raymond (Australia) Samantha Stosur	6	6
15	(Greece) Eleni Daniilidou (Spain) Anabel Medina Garrigues	2	2
4	(China) Yan Zi (China) Zheng Jie	3	6	3
5	(Slovakia) Daniela Hantuchová (Japan) Ai Sugiyama	6	3	6

Final
1	(United States) Lisa Raymond (Australia) Samantha Stosur	6	6
5	(Slovakia) Daniela Hantuchová (Japan) Ai Sugiyama	3	2

=== Top half ===
==== Section 1 ====
First round
1	(United States) L Raymond (Australia) S Stosur	6	6
(Poland) M Domachowska (Germany) J Wöhr	1	4
(United States) L Granville (United States) S Perry	7	2	4
(Finland) E Laine (Czech Republic) V Uhlířová	5	6	6
(Russia) A Rodionova (Romania) A Vanc	3	6	6
(United States) J Craybas (Croatia) J Kostanić	6	1	4
WC	(France) D Brunel (France) F Haring	1	1
16	(Russia) D Safina (Italy) R Vinci	6	6
10	(Czech Republic) K Peschke (Italy) F Schiavone	3	6	6
(France) S Cohen-Aloro (Tunisia) S Sfar	6	4	1
(United States) J Jackson (United States) M Washington	2	5
(China) N Li (China) S Peng	6	7
WC	(France) A Cornet (France) V Pichet	4	0
(Ukraine) A Bondarenko (Ukraine) Y Fedak	6	6
(Czech Republic) G Navrátilová (Czech Republic) M Paštiková	3	1
7	(South Africa) L Huber (United States) M Navratilova	6	6

Second round
1	(United States) L Raymond (Australia) S Stosur	6	6
(Finland) E Laine (Czech Republic) V Uhlířová	1	3
(Russia) A Rodionova (Romania) A Vanc	6^{3}	7	7
16	(Russia) D Safina (Italy) R Vinci	7	6^{5}	9
10	(Czech Republic) K Peschke (Italy) F Schiavone	w/o
(China) N Li (China) S Peng
(Ukraine) A Bondarenko (Ukraine) Y Fedak	6	3	6
7	(South Africa) L Huber (United States) M Navratilova	3	6	4

Third round
1	(United States) L Raymond (Australia) S Stosur	7	6^{2}	6
16	(Russia) D Safina (Italy) R Vinci	5	7	1
10	(Czech Republic) K Peschke (Italy) F Schiavone	6	6
(Ukraine) A Bondarenko (Ukraine) Y Fedak	4	3

Quarterfinals
1	(United States) L Raymond (Australia) S Stosur	6^{5}	6	6
10	(Czech Republic) K Peschke (Italy) F Schiavone	7	0	1

==== Section 2 ====
First round
3	(Germany) A-L Grönefeld (United States) M Shaughnessy	3	6	6
(Netherlands) M Krajicek (Hungary) Á Szávay	6	1	4
(Slovakia) J Husárová (India) S Mirza	6	6
(Colombia) C Castaño (Spain) C Martínez Granados	1	3
(Austria) S Bammer (Germany) J Schruff	7	6^{5}	6
(Hungary) M Czink (Estonia) K Kanepi	6^{3}	7	4
(France) V Razzano (Israel) A Smashnova	4	2
15	(Greece) E Daniilidou (Spain) A Medina Garrigues	6	6
9	(Russia) E Dementieva (Italy) F Pennetta	0	6	8
(Italy) ME Camerin (Italy) T Garbin	6	1	6
WC	(France) J Coin (France) Y Fedossova	2	1
(Estonia) M Ani (United States) M Tu	6	6
(France) N Dechy (Russia) V Zvonareva	3	6	7
(Japan) A Morigami (Japan) A Nakamura	6	1	5
(Switzerland) E Gagliardi (Italy) M Santangelo	6	6
6	(Japan) S Asagoe (Slovenia) K Srebotnik	3	2

Second round
3	(Germany) A-L Grönefeld (United States) M Shaughnessy	3	4
(Slovakia) J Husárová (India) S Mirza	6	6
(Austria) S Bammer (Germany) J Schruff	1	2
15	(Greece) E Daniilidou (Spain) A Medina Garrigues	6	6
9	(Russia) E Dementieva (Italy) F Pennetta	7	4	4
(Estonia) M Ani (United States) M Tu	6^{4}	6	6
(France) N Dechy (Russia) V Zvonareva	5	6	6
(Switzerland) E Gagliardi (Italy) M Santangelo	7	2	1

Third round
(Slovakia) J Husárová (India) S Mirza	0	4
15	(Greece) E Daniilidou (Spain) A Medina Garrigues	6	6
(Estonia) M Ani (United States) M Tu	2	6^{0}
(France) N Dechy (Russia) V Zvonareva	6	7

Quarterfinals
15	(Greece) E Daniilidou (Spain) A Medina Garrigues	6	6
(France) N Dechy (Russia) V Zvonareva	1	4

=== Bottom half ===
==== Section 3 ====
First round
8	(Spain) V Ruano Pascual (Argentina) P Suárez	6	6
(Czech Republic) L Hradecká (Slovakia) M Suchá	2	0
(France) S Foretz (Italy) An Serra Zanetti	4	3
(Russia) A Chakvetadze (Russia) E Vesnina	6	6
(Spain) L Domínguez Lino (Spain) M Sánchez Lorenzo	6	6
WC	(France) S Brémond (France) S Lefèvre	3	2
(United States) A Harkleroad (United States) B Mattek	4	2
11	(Argentina) G Dulko (Russia) M Kirilenko	6	6
14	(China) T Li (China) T Sun	7	2	6
(Canada) M Drake (Czech Republic) N Vaidišová	5	6	0
(United States) A Frazier (United States) V King	6	5	2
(Czech Republic) I Benešová (Czech Republic) B Strýcová	4	7	6
(Serbia and Montenegro) J Janković (Slovenia) T Križan	3	6	3
(Argentina) ME Salerni (Venezuela) M Vento-Kabchi	6	3	6
(United States) C Gullickson (Australia) B Stewart	2	4
4	(China) Z Yan (China) J Zheng	6	6

Second round
8	(Spain) V Ruano Pascual (Argentina) P Suárez	2	6	6
(Russia) A Chakvetadze (Russia) E Vesnina	6	4	8
(Spain) L Domínguez Lino (Spain) M Sánchez Lorenzo	4	3
11	(Argentina) G Dulko (Russia) M Kirilenko	6	6
14	(China) T Li (China) T Sun	6	6^{3}	4
(Czech Republic) I Benešová (Czech Republic) B Strýcová	4	7	6
(Argentina) ME Salerni (Venezuela) M Vento-Kabchi	2	1
4	(China) Z Yan (China) J Zheng	6	6

Third round
(Russia) A Chakvetadze (Russia) E Vesnina	6	6
11	(Argentina) G Dulko (Russia) M Kirilenko	3	4
(Czech Republic) I Benešová (Czech Republic) B Strýcová	6	4	2
4	(China) Z Yan (China) J Zheng	3	6	6

Quarterfinals
(Russia) A Chakvetadze (Russia) E Vesnina	6	2	1
4	(China) Z Yan (China) J Zheng	4	6	6

==== Section 4 ====
First round
5	(Slovakia) D Hantuchová (Japan) A Sugiyama	6	6
WC	(France) C Dhenin (France) M Johansson	4	3
(Sweden) S Arvidsson (Germany) M Müller	6	6
WC	(Argentina) M Díaz Oliva (Australia) A Molik	4	4
WC	(France) P Parmentier (France) C Pin	1	2
(Latvia) L Dekmeijere (Switzerland) P Schnyder	6	6
(France) M Bartoli (Israel) S Pe'er	3
12	(France) É Loit (Australia) N Pratt	3	r
13	(Russia) E Likhovtseva (Russia) A Myskina	6	6
(Ukraine) Y Beygelzimer (Czech Republic) E Birnerová	1	4
(Bulgaria) T Pironkova (China) M Yuan	6	6
(Belarus) T Poutchek (Belarus) A Yakimova	3	0
(Russia) V Dushevina (Russia) G Voskoboeva	4	3
(Russia) E Bychkova (Bosnia and Herzegovina) M Jugić-Salkić	6	6
(Czech Republic) K Koukalová (Czech Republic) L Šafářová	6	4	3
2	(Zimbabwe) C Black (Australia) R Stubbs	3	6	6

Second round
5	(Slovakia) D Hantuchová (Japan) A Sugiyama	6	6
(Sweden) S Arvidsson (Germany) M Müller	1	1
(Latvia) L Dekmeijere (Switzerland) P Schnyder	1	3
(France) M Bartoli (Israel) S Pe'er	6	6
13	(Russia) E Likhovtseva (Russia) A Myskina	7	6
(Bulgaria) T Pironkova (China) M Yuan	6^{4}	0
(Russia) E Bychkova (Bosnia and Herzegovina) M Jugić-Salkić	3	4
2	(Zimbabwe) C Black (Australia) R Stubbs	6	6

Third round
5	(Slovakia) D Hantuchová (Japan) A Sugiyama	1	7	6
(France) M Bartoli (Israel) S Pe'er	6	6^{2}	2
13	(Russia) E Likhovtseva (Russia) A Myskina	4	3
2	(Zimbabwe) C Black (Australia) R Stubbs	6	6

Quarterfinals
5	(Slovakia) D Hantuchová (Japan) A Sugiyama	6	7
2	(Zimbabwe) C Black (Australia) R Stubbs	1	6^{5}
