= 2006 French Open =

- Date: 28 May – 11 June 2006
- Edition: 105
- Category: 76th Grand Slam (ITF)
- Surface: Clay
- Location: Paris (XVI^{e}), France
- Venue: Stade Roland Garros

Champions

Men's singles
- (Spain) Rafael Nadal

Women's singles
- (Belgium) Justine Henin-Hardenne

Men's doubles
- (Sweden) Jonas Björkman / (Belarus) Max Mirnyi

Women's doubles
- (United States) Lisa Raymond / (Australia) Samantha Stosur

Mixed doubles
- (Slovenia) Katarina Srebotnik / (Serbia and Montenegro) Nenad Zimonjić

Boys' singles
- (Slovakia) Martin Kližan

Girls' singles
- (Poland) Agnieszka Radwańska

Boys' doubles
- (Argentina) Emiliano Massa / (Japan) Kei Nishikori

Girls' doubles
- (Canada) Sharon Fichman / (Russia) Anastasia Pavlyuchenkova
← 2005 ·	French Open	· 2007 →

The 2006 French Open was a tennis tournament that took place on the outdoor clay courts at the Stade Roland Garros in Paris, France from 28 May to 11 June 2006. It was the 105th staging of the French Open, and the second of the four Grand Slam tennis events of 2006. This edition made history as it became the first Grand Slam tournament to start on a Sunday. It was the 2nd time since 1985 that all top 4 seeds reached the semifinals in the men's singles of a Grand Slam tournament. This did not happen again until the same tournament five years later. Both defending champions, Rafael Nadal and Justine Henin-Hardenne, retained their titles.

== Seniors ==
=== Men's singles ===
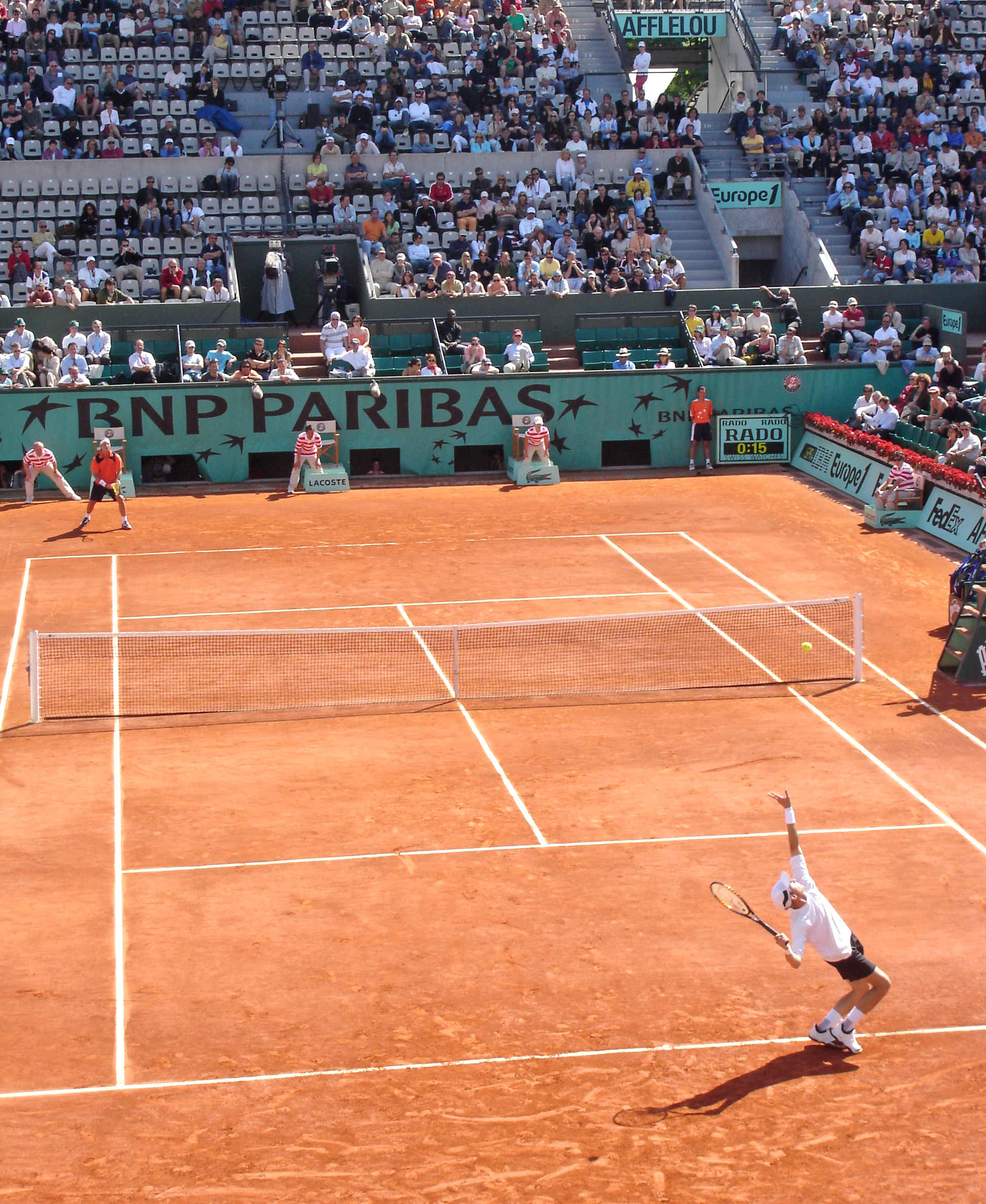
In the men's quarter finals, David Nalbandian won his match against Nikolay Davydenko.

(Spain) Rafael Nadal defeated (Switzerland) Roger Federer, 1–6, 6–1, 6–4, 7–6^{(7–4)}

- It was Nadal's 2nd career Grand Slam title, and his 2nd (consecutive) French Open title.

=== Women's singles ===
(Belgium) Justine Henin-Hardenne defeated (Russia) Svetlana Kuznetsova, 6–4, 6–4

- It was Henin-Hardenne's 3rd title of the year, and her 26th overall. It was her 5th career Grand Slam title, and her 3rd French Open title.

=== Men's doubles ===
(Sweden) Jonas Björkman / (Belarus) Max Mirnyi defeated (United States) Mike Bryan / (United States) Bob Bryan, 6–7^{(5–7)}, 6–4, 7–5

=== Women's doubles ===
(United States) Lisa Raymond / (Australia) Samantha Stosur defeated (Slovakia) Daniela Hantuchová / (Japan) Ai Sugiyama, 6–3, 6–2

=== Mixed doubles ===
(Slovenia) Katarina Srebotnik / (Serbia and Montenegro) Nenad Zimonjić defeated (Russia) Elena Likhovtseva / (Canada) Daniel Nestor, 6–3, 6–4

== Juniors ==
=== Boys' singles ===
(Slovakia) Martin Kližan defeated (Canada) Philip Bester 6–3, 6–1

=== Girls' singles ===
(Poland) Agnieszka Radwańska defeated (Russia) Anastasia Pavlyuchenkova 6–4, 6–1

=== Boys' doubles ===
(Argentina) Emiliano Massa / (Japan) Kei Nishikori defeated (Russia) Artur Chernov / (Russia) Valery Rudnev 2–6, 6–1, 6–2

=== Girls' doubles ===
(Canada) Sharon Fichman / (Russia) Anastasia Pavlyuchenkova defeated (Poland) Agnieszka Radwańska / (Denmark) Caroline Wozniacki 6–7^{(4–7)}, 6–2, 6–1

== Seeds ==
=== Men's singles ===
1. (Switzerland) Roger Federer (Runner-up, lost to Rafael Nadal)
2. (Spain) Rafael Nadal (champion)
3. (Argentina) David Nalbandian (semifinals, retired against Roger Federer)
4. (Croatia) Ivan Ljubičić (semifinals, lost to Rafael Nadal)
5. (United States) Andy Roddick (first round, retired against Alberto Martín)
6. (Russia) Nikolay Davydenko (quarterfinals, lost to David Nalbandian)
7. (Spain) Tommy Robredo (fourth round, lost to Mario Ančić)
8. (United States) James Blake (third round, lost to Gaël Monfils)
9. (Chile) Fernando González (second round, lost to Novak Djokovic)
10. (Argentina) Gastón Gaudio (fourth round, lost to Nikolay Davydenko)
11. (Czech Republic) Radek Štěpánek (third round, lost to Julien Benneteau)
12. (Croatia) Mario Ančić (quarterfinals, lost to Roger Federer)
13. (Germany) Nicolas Kiefer (third round, retired against Tomáš Berdych)
14. (Australia) Lleyton Hewitt (fourth round, lost to Rafael Nadal)
15. (Spain) David Ferrer (third round, lost to Rubén Ramírez Hidalgo)
16. (Finland) Jarkko Nieminen (first round, retired against Raemon Sluiter)
17. (United States) Robby Ginepri (first round, lost to Albert Montañés)
18. (Sweden) Thomas Johansson (first round, lost to Christophe Rochus)
19. (Cyprus) Marcos Baghdatis (second round, lost to Julien Benneteau)
20. (Czech Republic) Tomáš Berdych (fourth round, lost to Roger Federer)
21. (France) Sébastien Grosjean (second round, lost to Martín Vassallo Argüello)
22. (Slovakia) Dominik Hrbatý (third round, lost to Lleyton Hewitt)
23. (Germany) Tommy Haas (third round, lost to Novak Djokovic)
24. (Spain) Juan Carlos Ferrero (third round, lost to Gastón Gaudio)
25. (France) Gaël Monfils (fourth round, lost to Novak Djokovic)
26. (Argentina) José Acasuso (second round, lost to Lukáš Dlouhý)
27. (Belgium) Olivier Rochus (third round, lost to Alberto Martín)
28. (Spain) Fernando Verdasco (second round, lost to Juan Mónaco)
29. (France) Paul-Henri Mathieu (third round, lost to Rafael Nadal)
30. (Spain) Carlos Moyá (third round, lost to Nikolay Davydenko)
31. (Russia) Dmitry Tursunov (third round, lost to David Nalbandian)
32. (Chile) Nicolas Massú (third round, lost to Roger Federer)

=== Women's singles ===
1. (France) Amélie Mauresmo (fourth round, lost to Nicole Vaidišová)
2. (Belgium) Kim Clijsters (semifinals, lost to Justine Henin-Hardenne)
3. (Russia) Nadia Petrova (first round, lost to Akiko Morigami)
4. (Russia) Maria Sharapova (fourth round, lost to Dinara Safina)
5. (Belgium) Justine Henin-Hardenne (champion)
6. (Russia) Elena Dementieva (third round, lost to Shahar Pe'er)
7. (Switzerland) Patty Schnyder (fourth round, lost to Venus Williams)
8. (Russia) Svetlana Kuznetsova (Runner-up, lost to Justine Henin-Hardenne)
9. (Italy) Francesca Schiavone (fourth round, lost to Svetlana Kuznetsova)
10. (Russia) Anastasia Myskina (fourth round, lost to Justine Henin-Hardenne)
11. (United States) Venus Williams (quarterfinals, lost to Nicole Vaidišová)
12. (Switzerland) Martina Hingis (quarterfinals, lost to Kim Clijsters)
13. (Germany) Anna-Lena Grönefeld (quarterfinals, lost to Justine Henin-Hardenne)
14. (Russia) Dinara Safina (quarterfinals, lost to Svetlana Kuznetsova)
15. (Slovakia) Daniela Hantuchová (fourth round, lost to Kim Clijsters)
16. (Czech Republic) Nicole Vaidišová (semifinals, lost to Svetlana Kuznetsova)
17. (Italy) Flavia Pennetta (third round, lost to Francesca Schiavone)
18. (Russia) Elena Likhovtseva (first round, lost to Karolina Šprem)
19. (Serbia and Montenegro) Ana Ivanovic (third round, lost to Anastasia Myskina)
20. (Russia) Maria Kirilenko (third round, lost to Anna-Lena Grönefeld)
21. (France) Nathalie Dechy (third round, lost to Daniela Hantuchová)
22. (Japan) Ai Sugiyama (second round, lost to Aravane Rezaï)
23. (France) Tatiana Golovin (first round, lost to Zheng Jie)
24. (Slovenia) Katarina Srebotnik (third round, lost to Dinara Safina)
25. (France) Marion Bartoli (second round, lost to Jelena Janković)
26. (Spain) Anabel Medina Garrigues (third round, lost to Kim Clijsters)
27. (Russia) Anna Chakvetadze (second round, lost to Li Na)
28. (Czech Republic) Lucie Šafářová (first round, lost to Anda Perianu)
29. (Sweden) Sofia Arvidsson (second round, lost to Julia Vakulenko)
30. (Czech Republic) Klára Koukalová (first round, lost to Tathiana Garbin)
31. (Israel) Shahar Pe'er (fourth round, lost to Martina Hingis)
32. (Argentina) Gisela Dulko (fourth round, lost to Anna-Lena Grönefeld)

== Wild card entries ==
Below are the lists of the wild cards awardees entering in the main draws.

=== Men's singles ===
1. (France) Thierry Ascione
2. (France) Jérémy Chardy
3. (France) Jean-Christophe Faurel
4. (France) Marc Gicquel
5. (Australia) Nathan Healey
6. (France) Michaël Llodra
7. (France) Mathieu Montcourt
8. (France) Olivier Patience

=== Women's singles ===
1. (France) Séverine Brémond
2. (France) Stéphanie Cohen-Aloro
3. (France) Alizé Cornet
4. (France) Youlia Fedossova
5. (France) Mathilde Johansson
6. (Australia) Alicia Molik
7. (France) Pauline Parmentier
8. (France) Aurélie Védy

=== Men's doubles ===
1. (France) Thierry Ascione / (France) Florent Serra
2. (France) Jean-François Bachelot / (France) Stéphane Robert
3. (France) Grégory Carraz / (France) Antony Dupuis
4. (France) Jérémy Chardy / (France) Josselin Ouanna
5. (France) Nicolas Devilder / (France) Olivier Patience
6. (France) Marc Gicquel / (France) Gilles Simon
7. (France) Jérôme Haehnel / (France) Alexandre Sidorenko

=== Women's doubles ===
1. (France) Séverine Brémond / (France) Sophie Lefèvre
2. (France) Diana Brunel / (France) Florence Haring
3. (France) Julie Coin / (France) Youlia Fedossova
4. (France) Alizé Cornet / (France) Virginie Pichet
5. (France) Caroline Dhenin / (France) Mathilde Johansson
6. (Argentina) Mariana Díaz Oliva / (Australia) Alicia Molik
7. (France) Pauline Parmentier / (France) Camille Pin

=== Mixed doubles ===
1. (France) Séverine Brémond / (France) Marc Gicquel
2. (France) Alizé Cornet / (France) Jérémy Chardy
3. (France) Stéphanie Foretz / (France) Michaël Llodra
4. ~~(France) Émilie Loit~~ / ~~(France) Julien Jeanpierre~~ (withdrew)
5. (France) Pauline Parmentier / (Cyprus) Marcos Baghdatis
6. (France) Virginie Razzano / (France) Antony Dupuis

== Qualifier entries ==
=== Men's qualifiers entries ===
1. (Australia) Wayne Arthurs
2. (Croatia) Roko Karanušić
3. (Argentina) Martín Vassallo Argüello
4. (Argentina) Juan Martín del Potro
5. (Belgium) Dick Norman
6. (Italy) Stefano Galvani
7. (Argentina) Edgardo Massa
8. (Denmark) Kristian Pless
9. (Russia) Evgeny Korolev
10. (Argentina) Sergio Roitman
11. (Germany) Dieter Kindlmann
12. (Croatia) Saša Tuksar
13. (Serbia and Montenegro) Ilija Bozoljac
14. (Argentina) Diego Hartfield
15. (Brazil) Júlio Silva
16. (Spain) Óscar Hernández

The following players received entry into a lucky loser spot:

1. (Netherlands) Melle van Gemerden
2. (United States) Kevin Kim
3. (Colombia) Alejandro Falla

=== Women's qualifiers entries ===
1. (Ukraine) Julia Vakulenko
2. (Czech Republic) Eva Birnerová
3. (Germany) Sandra Klösel
4. (Argentina) Clarisa Fernández
5. (Belarus) Victoria Azarenka
6. (Italy) Alberta Brianti
7. (Chinese Taipei) Hsieh Su-wei
8. (Romania) Anda Perianu
9. (France) Virginie Pichet
10. (Russia) Galina Voskoboeva
11. (France) Aravane Rezaï
12. (Ukraine) Yuliya Beygelzimer

The following player received entry into a lucky loser spot:

1. (Belgium) Kirsten Flipkens

== Withdrawn players ==
Men's singles

- (United States) Andre Agassi → replaced by (Denmark) Kenneth Carlsen
- (Russia) Igor Andreev → replaced by (Spain) Albert Portas
- (Argentina) Agustín Calleri → replaced by (United States) Kevin Kim
- (France) Arnaud Clément → replaced by (Netherlands) Melle van Gemerden
- (Argentina) Guillermo Coria → replaced by (Spain) Fernando Vicente
- (United States) Taylor Dent → replaced by (Austria) Oliver Marach
- (Romania) Victor Hănescu → replaced by (Colombia) Alejandro Falla

Women's singles

- (Russia) Elena Bovina → replaced by (Croatia) Ivana Lisjak
- (United States) Lindsay Davenport → replaced by (Ukraine) Yuliana Fedak
- (Spain) Nuria Llagostera Vives → replaced by (Italy) Nathalie Viérin
- (Spain) Conchita Martínez → replaced by (Spain) Arantxa Parra Santonja
- (Switzerland) Marie-Gaïané Mikaelian → replaced by (Russia) Anastasia Rodionova
- (France) Mary Pierce → replaced by (Belgium) Kirsten Flipkens
- (United States) Serena Williams → replaced by (Slovakia) Hana Šromová

== Notes ==
Preceded by 2006 Australian Open	Grand Slams	Succeeded by 2006 Wimbledon Championships
