= 2006 French Open – Girls' singles =

Girls' singles
- 2006 French Open

Final
- Champion: (Poland) Agnieszka Radwańska
- Runner-up: (Russia) Anastasia Pavlyuchenkova
- Score: 6–4, 6–1

Events
Singles	men	women		boys	girls
Doubles	men	women	mixed	boys	girls
WC Singles	men	women	quad
WC Doubles	men	women	quad
Legends	−45	45+	women
← 2005 ·	French Open	· 2007 →

Agnieszka Radwańska won the title, defeating Anastasia Pavlyuchenkova in the final, 6–4, 6–1.

Ágnes Szávay was the defending champion, but chose not to participate. She received a wildcard into the women's singles qualifying competition where she lost to Aravane Rezaï in the final round.

== Seeds ==
1. (Russia) Anastasia Pavlyuchenkova (final)
2. (Poland) Agnieszka Radwańska (champion)
3. (Chinese Taipei) Chan Yung-jan (semifinals)
4. (Switzerland) Timea Bacsinszky (first round)
5. (Denmark) Caroline Wozniacki (third round)
6. (Japan) Ayumi Morita (first round)
7. (Russia) Alisa Kleybanova (first round)
8. (Romania) Raluca Olaru (first round)
9. (Romania) Mihaela Buzărnescu (third round)
10. (France) Alizé Cornet (quarterfinals)
11. (Romania) Sorana Cîrstea (third round)
12. (United States) Julia Cohen (second round)
13. (France) Youlia Fedossova (quarterfinals)
14. (Ukraine) Kristina Antoniychuk (third round)
15. (Slovakia) Kristína Kučová (second round)
16. (Brazil) Teliana Pereira (third round)

== Draw ==
=== Key ===
- Q = Qualifier
- WC = Wild card
- LL = Lucky loser
- Alt = Alternate
- SE = Special exempt
- PR = Protected ranking
- ITF = ITF entry
- JE = Junior exempt
- w/o = Walkover
- r = Retired
- d = Defaulted
- SR = Special ranking

=== Finals ===
Quarterfinals
1	(Russia) Anastasia Pavlyuchenkova	4	6	6
(Austria) Tamira Paszek	6	2	4
3	(Chinese Taipei) Chan Yung-jan	6	7^{7}
10	(France) Alizé Cornet	4	6^{4}
(Czech Republic) Kateřina Vaňková	3	6	7
4	(France) Youlia Fedossova	6	3	5
(Russia) Alexandra Panova	4	1
2	(Poland) Agnieszka Radwańska	6	6

Semifinals
1	(Russia) Anastasia Pavlyuchenkova	6	7
3	(Chinese Taipei) Chan Yung-jan	4	5
(Czech Republic) Kateřina Vaňková	2	1
2	(Poland) Agnieszka Radwańska	6	6

Final
1	(Russia) Anastasia Pavlyuchenkova	3	4
2	(Poland) Agnieszka Radwańska	6	6

=== Top half ===
==== Section 1 ====
First round
1	(Russia) Anastasia Pavlyuchenkova	6	6
(Slovakia) Dominika Cibulková	2	3
(Hong Kong) Chan Wing-yau	7^{7}	6
WC	(France) Victoria Larrière	6^{5}	2
Q	(Luxembourg) Lynn Philippe	6	2	0
WC	(France) Adeline Gonçalves	1	6	6
(Netherlands) Bibiane Schoofs	1	3
16	(Brazil) Teliana Pereira	6	6
9	(Romania) Mihaela Buzărnescu	6	7^{7}
(Bolivia) María Fernanda Álvarez Terán	3	6^{3}
(United States) Kimberly Couts	2	4
Q	(Russia) Anastasia Pivovarova	6	6
Q	(Kyrgyzstan) Ksenia Palkina	6	1	3
WC	(France) Cindy Chala	3	6	6
(Austria) Tamira Paszek	6	6
6	(Japan) Ayumi Morita	3	3

Second round
1	(Russia) A Pavlyuchenkova	6	6
(Hong Kong) W-y Chan	3	1
WC	(France) A Gonçalves	2	3
16	(Brazil) T Pereira	6	6
9	(Romania) M Buzărnescu	6	6
Q	(Russia) A Pivovarova	3	1
WC	(France) C Chala	2	3
(Austria) T Paszek	6	6

Third round
1	(Russia) A Pavlyuchenkova	6	6
16	(Brazil) T Pereira	4	0
9	(Romania) M Buzărnescu	6^{2}	2
(Austria) T Paszek	7^{7}	6

Quarterfinals
1	(Russia) A Pavlyuchenkova	4	6	6
(Austria) T Paszek	6	2	4

==== Section 2 ====
First round
3	(Chinese Taipei) Chan Yung-jan	6	6
(Uzbekistan) Dilyara Saidkhodjayeva	1	1
WC	(France) Irena Pavlovic	3	6	2
Q	(Austria) Melanie Klaffner	6	3	6
(United States) Lauren Albanese	1	1
(Russia) Evgeniya Rodina	6	6
(Serbia and Montenegro) Nataša Zorić	6	0	3
14	(Ukraine) Kristina Antoniychuk	3	6	6
10	(France) Alizé Cornet	6	6
(Brazil) Ana-Clara Duarte	2	0
(Netherlands) Anouk Tigu	6	5	6
(India) Sanaa Bhambri	3	7	2
(Romania) Alexandra Dulgheru	2	6	7
(Canada) Sharon Fichman	6	1	5
(Russia) Ekaterina Makarova	2	1
5	(Denmark) Caroline Wozniacki	6	6

Second round
3	(Chinese Taipei) Y-j Chan	6	6
Q	(Austria) M Klaffner	2	0
(Russia) E Rodina	1	6	0
14	(Ukraine) K Antoniychuk	6	4	6
10	(France) A Cornet	6	6
(Netherlands) A Tigu	3	1
(Romania) A Dulgheru	2	3
5	(Denmark) C Wozniacki	6	6

Third round
3	(Chinese Taipei) Y-j Chan	6	7
14	(Ukraine) K Antoniychuk	1	5
10	(France) A Cornet	3	7	8
5	(Denmark) C Wozniacki	6	5	6

Quarterfinals
3	(Chinese Taipei) Y-j Chan	6	7^{7}
10	(France) A Cornet	4	6^{4}

=== Bottom half ===
==== Section 3 ====
First round
7	(Russia) Alisa Kleybanova	5	3
(Czech Republic) Kateřina Vaňková	7	6
(Kazakhstan) Amina Rakhim	6	3	5
WC	(France) Stéphanie Vongsouthi	2	6	7
Q	(Sweden) Johanna Larsson	6	6
(Netherlands) Marrit Boonstra	4	3
(Hong Kong) Zhang Ling	4	2
11	(Romania) Sorana Cîrstea	6	6
13/WC	(France) Youlia Fedossova	5	6	8
(Russia) Ksenia Pervak	7	2	6
(Australia) Jessica Moore	6	6
(Austria) Nikola Hofmanova	3	0
(Belarus) Ksenia Milevskaya	6	6
(Slovakia) Michaela Pochabová	2	0
Q	(Germany) Dominice Ripoll	7^{7}	6
4	(Switzerland) Timea Bacsinszky	6^{3}	4

Second round
(Czech Republic) K Vaňková	6	7
WC	(France) S Vongsouthi	1	5
Q	(Sweden) J Larsson	7	3	1
11	(Romania) S Cîrstea	5	6	6
13/WC	(France) Y Fedossova	6	6
(Australia) J Moore	3	2
(Belarus) K Milevskaya	2	6	6
Q	(Germany) D Ripoll	6	2	4

Third round
(Czech Republic) K Vaňková	6	6
11	(Romania) S Cîrstea	1	3
13/WC	(France) Y Fedossova	6	3	7
(Belarus) K Milevskaya	2	6	5

Quarterfinals
(Czech Republic) K Vaňková	3	6	7
13/WC	(France) Y Fedossova	6	3	5

==== Section 4 ====
First round
8	(Romania) Raluca Olaru	3	4
(Russia) Alexandra Panova	6	6
Q	(Netherlands) Marlot Meddens	6^{6}	6	6
(Belgium) Yanina Wickmayer	7^{8}	1	3
WC	(France) Gracia Radovanovic	0	2
(Brazil) Roxane Vaisemberg	6	6
Q	(Thailand) Noppawan Lertcheewakarn	2	3
12	(United States) Julia Cohen	6	6
15	(Slovakia) Kristína Kučová	3	6	6
(Philippines) Denise Dy	6	0	3
WC	(France) Charlotte Rodier	6	6^{6}	1
(Italy) Corinna Dentoni	4	7^{8}	6
(Russia) Maya Gaverova	6	6
(New Zealand) Sacha Jones	4	3
(Mexico) Valeria Pulido	0	4
2	(Poland) Agnieszka Radwańska	6	6

Second round
(Russia) A Panova	6	6
Q	(Netherlands) M Meddens	3	2
(Brazil) R Vaisemberg	7^{7}	6
12	(United States) J Cohen	6^{3}	4
15	(Slovakia) K Kučová	2	7	3
(Italy) C Dentoni	6	5	6
(Russia) M Gaverova	0	r
2	(Poland) A Radwańska	2

Third round
(Russia) A Panova	6	6
(Brazil) R Vaisemberg	2	1
(Italy) C Dentoni	4	0
2	(Poland) A Radwańska	6	6

Quarterfinals
(Russia) A Panova	4	1
2	(Poland) A Radwańska	6	6

== Sources ==
- Draw
