= 2006 French Open – Mixed doubles =

Mixed doubles
- 2006 French Open

Final
- Champion: (Slovenia) Katarina Srebotnik (Serbia and Montenegro) Nenad Zimonjić
- Runner-up: (Russia) Elena Likhovtseva (Canada) Daniel Nestor
- Score: 6–3, 6–4

Details
- Draw: 32
- Seeds: 8

Events
Singles	men	women		boys	girls
Doubles	men	women	mixed	boys	girls
WC Singles	men	women	quad
WC Doubles	men	women	quad
Legends	−45	45+	women
- French Open

2006 French Open mixed doubles was an event at the 2006 French Open.

Daniela Hantuchová and Fabrice Santoro were the defending champions, but Hantuchová chose not to participate that year. Santoro paired up alongside Amélie Mauresmo instead, but lost to eventual finalists Elena Likhovtseva and Daniel Nestor in the first round.

Katarina Srebotnik and Nenad Zimonjić won the final against Likhovtseva and Nestor with the score of 6–3, 6–4.

== Schedule ==
Round	Dates
First round	1 June, 2 June and 3 June 2006
Second round	4 June and 5 June 2006
Quarterfinals	6 June and 7 June 2006
Semifinals	8 June 2006
Final	9 June 2006

== Seeds ==
1. (United States) Lisa Raymond / (Sweden) Jonas Björkman (first round)
2. (Zimbabwe) Cara Black / (Zimbabwe) Kevin Ullyett (first round)
3. (United States) Meghann Shaughnessy / (United States) Mike Bryan (first round)
4. (China) Zheng Jie / (Belarus) Max Mirnyi (second round)
5. (Australia) Rennae Stubbs / (Australia) Todd Perry (quarterfinals)
6. (United States) Martina Navratilova / (United States) Bob Bryan (semifinals)
7. (Russia) Elena Likhovtseva / (Canada) Daniel Nestor (final)
8. (Slovenia) Katarina Srebotnik / (Serbia and Montenegro) Nenad Zimonjić (champions)

== Draw ==
Key

- Q = Qualifier
- WC = Wild card
- LL = Lucky loser
- Alt = Alternate
- ITF = ITF entry
- PR = Protected ranking
- SR = Special ranking
- SE = Special exempt
- JE = Junior exempt
- JR = Junior Accelerator Programme entrant
- CO = College Accelerator Programme entrant
- NG = Next Gen Accelerator Program entrant
- w/o = Walkover
- r = Retired
- d = Defaulted

=== Finals ===
Semifinals
7	(Russia) Elena Likhovtseva (Canada) Daniel Nestor	3	6	6
6	(United States) Martina Navratilova (United States) Bob Bryan	6	3	3
8	(Slovenia) Katarina Srebotnik (Serbia and Montenegro) Nenad Zimonjić	6	6
(Russia) Vera Zvonareva (Israel) Andy Ram	4	2

Final
7	(Russia) Elena Likhovtseva (Canada) Daniel Nestor	3	4
8	(Slovenia) Katarina Srebotnik (Serbia and Montenegro) Nenad Zimonjić	6	6

=== Top half ===
First round
1	(United States) L Raymond (Sweden) J Björkman	6	3	2
(Australia) B Stewart (Poland) M Matkowski	2	6	6
(Russia) A Myskina (Austria) J Melzer	6^{4}	6	6
(Argentina) P Suárez (The Bahamas) M Knowles	7	1	1
(Israel) S Pe'er (Israel) J Erlich	2	6^{8}
(South Africa) L Huber (Czech Republic) L Friedl	6	7
(France) A Mauresmo (France) F Santoro	4	6^{3}
7	(Russia) E Likhovtseva (Canada) D Nestor	6	7
3	(United States) M Shaughnessy (United States) M Bryan	3	6	2
(Russia) M Kirilenko (India) L Paes	6	1	6
WC	(France) S Foretz (France) M Llodra	4	5
WC	(France) S Brémond (France) M Gicquel	6	7
(Switzerland) M Hingis (India) M Bhupathi	7	6
(Sweden) S Arvidsson (Australia) S Huss	5	2
(India) S Mirza (Australia) P Hanley	0	4
6	(United States) M Navratilova (United States) B Bryan	6	6

Second round
(Australia) B Stewart (Poland) M Matkowski	w/o
(Russia) A Myskina (Austria) J Melzer
(South Africa) L Huber (Czech Republic) L Friedl	0	4
7	(Russia) E Likhovtseva (Canada) D Nestor	6	6
(Russia) M Kirilenko (India) L Paes	7	7
WC	(France) S Brémond (France) M Gicquel	5	6^{3}
(Switzerland) M Hingis (India) M Bhupathi
6	(United States) M Navratilova (United States) B Bryan	w/o

Quarterfinals
(Australia) B Stewart (Poland) M Matkowski	5	6	3
7	(Russia) E Likhovtseva (Canada) D Nestor	7	1	6
(Russia) M Kirilenko (India) L Paes	3	3
6	(United States) M Navratilova (United States) B Bryan	6	6

Semifinals
7	(Russia) E Likhovtseva (Canada) D Nestor	3	6	6
6	(United States) M Navratilova (United States) B Bryan	6	3	3

=== Bottom half ===
First round
8	(Slovenia) K Srebotnik (Serbia and Montenegro) N Zimonjić	7	6
(Czech Republic) K Peschke (Czech Republic) M Damm	6^{7}	4
WC	(France) V Razzano (France) A Dupuis	3	1
Alt	(Colombia) C Castaño (Poland) M Fyrstenberg	6	6
WC	(France) P Parmentier (Cyprus) M Baghdatis	1	1
(Argentina) G Dulko (Chile) F González	6	6
(China) Z Yan (South Africa) C Haggard	2	5
4	(China) J Zheng (Belarus) M Mirnyi	6	7
5	(Australia) R Stubbs (Australia) T Perry	4	6	6
(Spain) V Ruano Pascual (Argentina) S Prieto	6	4	3
(Russia) A Chakvetadze (Austria) J Knowle	4	r
(Australia) N Pratt (Czech Republic) P Vízner	4
(Russia) V Zvonareva (Israel) A Ram	6	6
WC	(France) A Cornet (France) J Chardy	3	0
(China) T Sun (Sweden) S Aspelin	6	3	6
2	(Zimbabwe) C Black (Zimbabwe) K Ullyett	0	6	1

Second round
8	(Slovenia) K Srebotnik (Serbia and Montenegro) N Zimonjić	6	6
Alt	(Colombia) C Castaño (Poland) M Fyrstenberg	1	3
(Argentina) G Dulko (Chile) F González	7	5	6
4	(China) J Zheng (Belarus) M Mirnyi	6^{8}	7	3
5	(Australia) R Stubbs (Australia) T Perry	7	6
(Australia) N Pratt (Czech Republic) P Vízner	6^{2}	4
(Russia) V Zvonareva (Israel) A Ram	6	4	6
(China) T Sun (Sweden) S Aspelin	2	6	3

Quarterfinals
8	(Slovenia) K Srebotnik (Serbia and Montenegro) N Zimonjić	6^{5}	6	9
(Argentina) G Dulko (Chile) F González	7	4	7
5	(Australia) R Stubbs (Australia) T Perry	6^{5}	2
(Russia) V Zvonareva (Israel) A Ram	7	6

Semifinals
8	(Slovenia) K Srebotnik (Serbia and Montenegro) N Zimonjić	6	6
(Russia) V Zvonareva (Israel) A Ram	4	2
