= 2006 French Open – Boys' singles =

Boys' singles
- 2006 French Open

Final
- Champion: (Slovakia) Martin Kližan
- Runner-up: (Canada) Philip Bester
- Score: 6-3, 6-1

Events
| Singles | men | women | | boys | girls |
| Doubles | men | women | mixed | boys | girls |
| WC Singles | men | women | quad |
| WC Doubles | men | women | quad |
| Legends | −45 | 45+ | women |
- French Open

2008 Caribbean Cup qualification details the events and standings for the Boys' singles junior events held at the French Open in 2006.

== Seeds ==
1. (Netherlands) Thiemo de Bakker (semifinals)
2. (United States) Donald Young (third round)
3. (France) Alexandre Sidorenko (first round)
4. (Croatia) Luka Belić (second round)
5. (Brazil) Nicolás Santos (first round)
6. (France) Jonathan Eysseric (second round)
7. (India) Sanam Singh (second round)
8. (Romania) Petru-Alexandru Luncanu (semifinals)
9. (Chinese Taipei) Lee Hsin-han (third round)
10. (Ukraine) Ivan Sergeyev (third round)
11. (Spain) Albert Ramos (third round)
12. (Czech Republic) Roman Jebavý (first round)
13. (Japan) Sho Aida (first round)
14. (France) Kevin Botti (second round)
15. (Switzerland) Robin Roshardt (quarterfinals)
16. (Croatia) Antonio Veić (first round)

== Draw ==
Key

- Q = Qualifier
- WC = Wild card
- LL = Lucky loser
- Alt = Alternate
- ITF = ITF entry
- PR = Protected ranking
- SR = Special ranking
- SE = Special exempt
- JE = Junior exempt
- JR = Junior Accelerator Programme entrant
- CO = College Accelerator Programme entrant
- NG = Next Gen Accelerator Program entrant
- w/o = Walkover
- r = Retired
- d = Defaulted

=== Final eight ===
Quarterfinals
1 | (Netherlands) Thiemo de Bakker | 6 | 6
(Slovakia) Andrej Martin | 4 | 0
15 | (Switzerland) Robin Roshardt | 6^{6} | 5
(Canada) Philip Bester | 7 | 7
8 | (Romania) Petru-Alexandru Luncanu | 6 | 6
(Japan) Kei Nishikori | 4 | 1
(Slovakia) Martin Kližan | 6 | 6
(Portugal) Pedro Sousa | 1 | 1

Semifinals
1 | (Netherlands) Thiemo de Bakker | 3 | 7 | 4
(Canada) Philip Bester | 6 | 5 | 6
8 | (Romania) Petru-Alexandru Luncanu | 0 | 3
(Slovakia) Martin Kližan | 6 | 6

Final
(Canada) Philip Bester | 3 | 1
(Slovakia) Martin Kližan | 6 | 6

=== Top half ===
==== Section 1 ====
First round
1 | (Netherlands) Thiemo de Bakker | 6 | 6
(Russia) Valery Rudnev | 4 | 3
WC | (France) Jérôme Inzerillo | 1 | 4
(India) Jeevan Nedunchezhiyan | 6 | 6
(Croatia) Nikola Mektić | 2 | 4
(Spain) Javier Garrapiz-Borderías | 6 | 6
(Kenya) Christian Vitulli | 6 | 7
13 | (Japan) Sho Aida | 3 | 5
10 | (Ukraine) Ivan Sergeyev | 0 | 6 | 6
(Chile) Hans Podlipnik Castillo | 6 | 3 | 4
(Indonesia) Faisal Aidil | 3 | 6 | 1
(Australia) James Lemke | 6 | 2 | 6
(Greece) Paris Gemouchidis | 6 | 3 | 2
(Slovakia) Andrej Martin | 3 | 6 | 6
(United States) Dennis Lajola | 4 | 2
6 | (France) Jonathan Eysseric | 6 | 6

Second round
1 | (Netherlands) T de Bakker | 6 | 6
(India) J Nedunchezhiyan | 2 | 2
(Spain) J Garrapiz-Borderías | 6 | 3
(Kenya) C Vitulli | 0 | 0 | ret.
10 | (Ukraine) I Sergeyev | 6 | 6
(Australia) J Lemke | 1 | 2
(Slovakia) A Martin | 7 | 7
6 | (France) J Eysseric | 5 | 6^{5}

Third round
1 | (Netherlands) T de Bakker | 6 | 6
(Spain) J Garrapiz-Borderías | 1 | 2
10 | (Ukraine) I Sergeyev | 3 | 6 | 3
(Slovakia) A Martin | 6 | 3 | 6

Quarterfinals
1 | (Netherlands) T de Bakker | 6 | 6
(Slovakia) A Martin | 4 | 0

==== Section 2 ====
First round
4 | (Croatia) Luka Belić | 6 | 7^{7}
(Russia) Artur Chernov | 3 | 6^{4}
(Paraguay) Daniel-Alejandro Lopez | 6 | 6
WC | (France) Nassim Slilam | 3 | 2
(Estonia) Jaak Põldma | 6 | 6
Q | (Poland) Marcin Gawron | 4 | 2
WC | (France) Boris Obama | 3 | 6^{5}
15 | (Switzerland) Robin Roshardt | 6 | 7
12 | (Czech Republic) Roman Jebavý | 4 | 4
Q | (China) Xu Junchao | 6 | 6
WC | (France) Axel Michon | 1 | 4
(Canada) Philip Bester | 6 | 6
Q | (Spain) Pere Riba | 2 | 6 | 5
(United States) Kellen Damico | 6 | 2 | 7
(Belgium) Ruben Bemelmans | 6 | 4 | 6
5 | (Brazil) Nicolas Santos | 4 | 6 | 3

Second round
4 | (Croatia) L Belić | 2 | 0
(Paraguay) D-A Lopez | 6 | 6
(Estonia) J Põldma | 3 | 3
15 | (Switzerland) R Roshardt | 6 | 6
(China) J-C Xu | 3 | 2
(Canada) P Bester | 6 | 6
(United States) K Damico | 4 | 1
(Belgium) R Bemelmans | 6 | 6

Third round
(Paraguay) D-A Lopez | 2 | 3
15 | (Switzerland) R Roshardt | 6 | 6
(Canada) P Bester | 6 | 6
(Belgium) R Bemelmans | 3 | 4

Quarterfinals
15 | (Switzerland) R Roshardt | 6^{6} | 5
(Canada) P Bester | 7 | 7^{7}

==== Section 3 ====
First round
8 | (Romania) Petru-Alexandru Luncanu | 6 | 6
(Russia) Pavel Chekhov | 4 | 4
Q | (Spain) Roberto Bautista Agut | 4 | 6 | 6
WC | (France) Stéphane Piro | 6 | 2 | 3
(Italy) Thomas Fabbiano | 6 | 3 | 1^{r}
(Australia) Stephen Donald | 2 | 6 | 3
WC | (France) Adrian Mannarino | 3 | 6 | 3
9 | (Chinese Taipei) Lee Hsin-han | 6 | 3 | 6
16 | (Croatia) Antonio Veić | 5 | 3
(Czech Republic) Michal Konečný | 7 | 6
(United States) Jamie Hunt | 3 | 3
(Brazil) Daniel Silva | 6 | 6
(Venezuela) Roberto Maytín | 6^{4} | 6^{8}
(Poland) Błażej Koniusz | 7^{7} | 7^{10}
(Japan) Kei Nishikori | 6 | 6
3 | (France) Alexandre Sidorenko | 4 | 0

Second round
8 | (Romania) P-A Luncanu | 6 | 7
Q | (Spain) R Bautista Agut | 3 | 5
(Australia) S Donald | 4 | 4
9 | (Chinese Taipei) H-h Lee | 6 | 6
(Czech Republic) M Konečný | 6 | 6
(Brazil) D Silva | 2 | 2
(Poland) B Koniusz | 3 | 1
(Japan) K Nishikori | 6 | 6

Third round
8 | (Romania) P-A Luncanu | 6 | 6
9 | (Chinese Taipei) H-h Lee | 4 | 1
(Czech Republic) M Konečný | 4 | 3
(Japan) K Nishikori | 6 | 6

Quarterfinals
8 | (Romania) P-A Luncanu | 6 | 6
(Japan) K Nishikori | 4 | 1

==== Section 4 ====
First round
7 | (India) Sanam Singh | 1 | 7 | 6
WC | (France) Guillaume Rufin | 6 | 5 | 2
(Slovakia) Martin Kližan | 2 | 7 | 7
(Argentina) Emiliano Massa | 6 | 6^{4} | 5
(United States) Clint Bowles | 6 | 6
(China) Yan Bai | 4 | 0
WC | (France) Vincent Sapene | 2 | 2
11 | (Spain) Albert Ramos Viñolas | 6 | 6
14 | (France) Kevin Botti | 6 | 6
Q | (Netherlands) Peter Lucassen | 2 | 2
(Australia) Brydan Klein | 4 | 6 | 4
(Portugal) Pedro Sousa | 6 | 4 | 6
Q | (Sweden) Tim Göransson | 4 | 5
Q | (Chile) Ricardo Urzúa Rivera | 6 | 7
Q | (Switzerland) Dylan Loic Sessagesimi | 6 | 0 | 0
2 | (United States) Donald Young | 1 | 6 | 6

Second round
7 | (India) S Singh | 2 | 5
(Slovakia) M Kližan | 6 | 7
(United States) C Bowles | 5 | 2
11 | (Spain) A Ramos Viñolas | 7 | 6
14 | (France) K Botti | 5 | 1
(Portugal) P Sousa | 7 | 6
Q | (Chile) RU Rivera | 3 | 1
2 | (United States) D Young | 6 | 6

Third round
(Slovakia) M Kližan | 6 | 6
11 | (Spain) A Ramos Viñolas | 3 | 1
(Portugal) P Sousa | 2 | 6 | 6
2 | (United States) D Young | 6 | 2 | 4

Quarterfinals
(Slovakia) M Kližan | 6 | 6
(Portugal) P Sousa | 1 | 1

== Sources ==
- ITF Tennis
