= 2006 Wimbledon Championships – Men's singles qualifying =

Men's singles qualifying
- 2006 Wimbledon Championships

Events
Singles	men	women		boys	girls
Doubles	men	women	mixed	boys	girls
WC Singles	men	women	quad
WC Doubles	men	women	quad
Legends	men	women	seniors

Qualification
Singles	men	women
Doubles	men	women
- Wimbledon Championships

Players and pairs who neither have high enough rankings nor receive wild cards may participate in a qualifying tournament held one week before the annual Wimbledon Tennis Championships.

== Seeds ==
1. (United States) Kevin Kim (qualified)
2. (Denmark) Kenneth Carlsen (qualifying competition)
3. (Paraguay) Ramón Delgado (qualifying competition)
4. (United States) Bobby Reynolds (first round)
5. (Germany) Michael Berrer (qualified)
6. (Canada) Frank Dancevic (qualified)
7. (Colombia) Alejandro Falla (qualified)
8. (Poland) Łukasz Kubot (second round)
9. (Chile) Paul Capdeville (first round)
10. (Denmark) Kristian Pless (qualified)
11. (South Africa) Rik de Voest (first round)
12. (Italy) Stefano Galvani (qualified)
13. (France) Jean-Christophe Faurel (qualifying competition, lucky loser)
14. (Italy) Flavio Cipolla (qualifying competition)
15. (Germany) Lars Burgsmüller (second round, retired)
16. (Serbia) Ilija Bozoljac (second round)
17. (France) Olivier Patience (second round)
18. (Switzerland) George Bastl (qualifying competition)
19. (Argentina) Diego Hartfield (qualifying competition)
20. (United States) Zack Fleishman (qualifying competition)
21. (United States) Alex Bogomolov Jr. (first round)
22. (Belgium) Gilles Elseneer (second round)
23. (Mexico) Santiago González (second round)
24. (Australia) Peter Luczak (second round)
25. (Czech Republic) Tomáš Cakl (first round)
26. (France) Antony Dupuis (first round, retired)
27. (Croatia) Roko Karanušić (qualified)
28. (France) Nicolas Devilder (first round)
29. (France) Jérôme Haehnel (second round)
30. (Israel) Dudi Sela (first round)
31. (Georgia (country)) Irakli Labadze (qualified)
32. (Italy) Simone Bolelli (qualifying competition)

== Qualifiers ==
1. (United States) Kevin Kim
2. (Georgia (country)) Irakli Labadze
3. (Croatia) Roko Karanušić
4. (Spain) Marcel Granollers
5. (Germany) Michael Berrer
6. (Canada) Frank Dancevic
7. (Colombia) Alejandro Falla
8. (Germany) Simon Stadler
9. (Austria) Alexander Peya
10. (Denmark) Kristian Pless
11. (United Kingdom) Josh Goodall
12. (Italy) Stefano Galvani
13. (Australia) Wayne Arthurs
14. (Germany) Benedikt Dorsch
15. (United States) Robert Kendrick
16. (Germany) Benjamin Becker

== Lucky loser ==
1. (France) Jean-Christophe Faurel

== Qualifying draw ==
=== First qualifier ===
First round
1	(United States) Kevin Kim	6	6
(Netherlands Antilles) Jean-Julien Rojer	4	1
(France) Jérémy Chardy	6	6
(Belgium) Stefan Wauters	4	4
WC	(United Kingdom) Jonathan Marray	3	6^{2}
(Czech Republic) Pavel Šnobel	6	7^{7}
(Czech Republic) Jan Mašík	4	4
19	(Argentina) Diego Hartfield	6	6

Second round
1	(United States) Kevin Kim	6	7
(France) Jérémy Chardy	2	5
(Czech Republic) Pavel Šnobel	6	4	3
19	(Argentina) Diego Hartfield	4	6	6

Qualifying competition
1	(United States) Kevin Kim	7^{10}	7	6
19	(Argentina) Diego Hartfield	6^{8}	5	1

=== Second qualifier ===
First round
2/WC	(Denmark) Kenneth Carlsen	6	6
(United States) Sam Warburg	0	2
(Philippines) Cecil Mamiit	1	6	3
(Australia) Robert Smeets	6	1	6
(Spain) Gorka Fraile	3	1
(United States) Jeff Morrison	6	6
(Spain) Marc López	6	6^{4}	4
31	(Georgia (country)) Irakli Labadze	3	7^{7}	6

Second round
2/WC	(Denmark) Kenneth Carlsen	6	7^{7}
(Australia) Robert Smeets	4	6^{4}
(United States) Jeff Morrison	7	3	3
31	(Georgia (country)) Irakli Labadze	5	6	6

Qualifying competition
2/WC	(Denmark) Kenneth Carlsen	6	6^{4}	1	5
31	(Georgia (country)) Irakli Labadze	2	7^{7}	6	7

=== Third qualifier ===
First round
3	(Paraguay) Ramón Delgado	7	6
(Slovakia) Michal Mertiňák	5	3
(Australia) Chris Guccione	1	2
(Ukraine) Sergiy Stakhovsky	6	6
(Israel) Amir Hadad	6^{2}	6	3
(Spain) Carlos Cuadrado	7^{7}	3	6
(Argentina) Damián Patriarca	2	3
27	(Croatia) Roko Karanušić	6	6

Second round
3	(Paraguay) Ramón Delgado	7^{7}	6^{6}	10
(Ukraine) Sergiy Stakhovsky	6^{4}	7^{8}	8
(Spain) Carlos Cuadrado	5	5
27	(Croatia) Roko Karanušić	7	7

Qualifying competition
3	(Paraguay) Ramón Delgado	5	4	6	1
27	(Croatia) Roko Karanušić	7	6	4	6

=== Fourth qualifier ===
First round
4	(United States) Bobby Reynolds	4	7	3
(Greece) Konstantinos Economidis	6	5	6
(Spain) Marcel Granollers	6	6
(France) Stéphane Robert	4	3
PR	(Switzerland) Marco Chiudinelli	6	6
(Germany) Lars Uebel	4	4
(United Kingdom) Arvind Parmar	6^{5}	0^{r}
23	(Mexico) Santiago González	7^{7}	1

Second round
(Greece) Konstantinos Economidis	3	4
(Spain) Marcel Granollers	6	6
PR	(Switzerland) Marco Chiudinelli	6	6
23	(Mexico) Santiago González	3	3

Qualifying competition
(Spain) Marcel Granollers	7^{7}	6	6
PR	(Switzerland) Marco Chiudinelli	6^{3}	3	1

=== Fifth qualifier ===
First round
5	(Germany) Michael Berrer	6	6
(United States) Todd Widom	3	2
(United States) Rajeev Ram	7^{7}	0	4
(United States) Eric Nunez	6^{4}	6	6
(United States) Amer Delić	6^{3}	2
(Brazil) André Sá	7^{7}	6
(United States) Jesse Witten	3	7^{7}	6
30	(Israel) Dudi Sela	6	6^{5}	4

Second round
5	(Germany) Michael Berrer	6	6
(United States) Eric Nunez	2	2
(Brazil) André Sá	2^{r}
(United States) Jesse Witten	5

Qualifying competition
5	(Germany) Michael Berrer	6	6	6
(United States) Jesse Witten	3	3	4

=== Sixth qualifier ===
First round
6	(Canada) Frank Dancevic	6	4	6
WC	(South Africa) Wesley Whitehouse	2	6	2
(Italy) Andrea Stoppini	6	6
PR	(Germany) Dieter Kindlmann	4	0
(Sweden) Björn Rehnquist	2	4
(Israel) Noam Okun	6	6
(Spain) Álex Calatrava	6^{3}	5
17	(France) Olivier Patience	7^{7}	7

Second round
6	(Canada) Frank Dancevic	6	6
(Italy) Andrea Stoppini	1	1
(Israel) Noam Okun	6	7
17	(France) Olivier Patience	4	5

Qualifying competition
6	(Canada) Frank Dancevic	7	7^{7}	6
(Israel) Noam Okun	5	6^{2}	4

=== Seventh qualifier ===
First round
7	(Colombia) Alejandro Falla	6	6
(South Korea) Kwon Oh-hee	1	4
(Poland) Adam Chadaj	3	3
(Netherlands) Peter Wessels	6	6
(Germany) Tobias Summerer	0	6	6
(Canada) Frédéric Niemeyer	6	3	0
(Sweden) Filip Prpic	2	6^{5}
20	(United States) Zack Fleishman	6	7^{7}

Second round
7	(Colombia) Alejandro Falla	6	6
(Netherlands) Peter Wessels	3	2
(Germany) Tobias Summerer	6	6^{1}	3
20	(United States) Zack Fleishman	3	7^{7}	6

Qualifying competition
7	(Colombia) Alejandro Falla	5	4	6	6	6
20	(United States) Zack Fleishman	7	6	3	3	4

=== Eighth qualifier ===
First round
8	(Poland) Łukasz Kubot	6^{4}	6	11
(France) Jean-Michel Pequery	7^{7}	2	9
(France) Grégory Carraz	6	7^{7}
(Japan) Go Soeda	2	6^{4}
(Germany) Andreas Beck	4	4
(Germany) Simon Stadler	6	6
(United States) Glenn Weiner	6	2	1
22	(Belgium) Gilles Elseneer	3	6	6

Second round
8	(Poland) Łukasz Kubot	5	3
(France) Grégory Carraz	7	6
(Germany) Simon Stadler	5	6	6
22	(Belgium) Gilles Elseneer	7	2	1

Qualifying competition
(France) Grégory Carraz	6^{3}	1	4
(Germany) Simon Stadler	7^{7}	6	6

=== Ninth qualifier ===
First round
9	(Chile) Paul Capdeville	0	4
(Austria) Alexander Peya	6	6
(France) Gary Lugassy	3	2
(Italy) Federico Luzzi	6	6
WC	(Serbia) Nenad Zimonjić	6	3	4
(Brazil) Júlio Silva	1	6	6
(Argentina) Cristian Villagrán	1	3
18	(Switzerland) George Bastl	6	6

Second round
(Austria) Alexander Peya	6	2	6
(Italy) Federico Luzzi	2	6	3
(Brazil) Júlio Silva	2	1
18	(Switzerland) George Bastl	6	6

Qualifying competition
(Austria) Alexander Peya	6	6	6
18	(Switzerland) George Bastl	4	4	4

=== Tenth qualifier ===
First round
10	(Denmark) Kristian Pless	6	6
(United States) Brian Vahaly	4	4
(Algeria) Slimane Saoudi	4	4
(Italy) Uros Vico	6	6
(Spain) Santiago Ventura Bertomeu	6^{3}	1
(Slovakia) Ivo Klec	7^{7}	6
Alt	(Netherlands) Jasper Smit	5	2
29	(France) Jérôme Haehnel	7	6

Second round
10	(Denmark) Kristian Pless	7^{9}	6
(Italy) Uros Vico	6^{7}	3
(Slovakia) Ivo Klec	6	7^{7}
29	(France) Jérôme Haehnel	4	6^{4}

Qualifying competition
10	(Denmark) Kristian Pless	7^{7}	7	6
(Slovakia) Ivo Klec	6^{5}	5	2

=== Eleventh qualifier ===
First round
11	(South Africa) Rik de Voest	6	1	7
WC	(United Kingdom) Josh Goodall	3	6	9
(Serbia) Dušan Vemić	4	7	7
(Algeria) Lamine Ouahab	6	5	5
(Italy) Simone Vagnozzi	4	1
(United States) Scoville Jenkins	6	6
(Switzerland) Michael Lammer	6	6
21	(United States) Alex Bogomolov Jr.	4	4

Second round
WC	(United Kingdom) Josh Goodall	6	7^{7}
(Serbia) Dušan Vemić	2	6^{4}
(United States) Scoville Jenkins	6	6
(Switzerland) Michael Lammer	3	2

Qualifying competition
WC	(United Kingdom) Josh Goodall	7^{7}	4	7^{8}	7^{7}
(United States) Scoville Jenkins	6^{4}	6	6^{6}	6^{1}

=== Twelfth qualifier ===
First round
12	(Italy) Stefano Galvani	6	6
(United States) John Paul Fruttero	2	4
(United States) Phillip Simmonds	2	6^{2}
(Australia) Alun Jones	6	7^{7}
(Serbia) Viktor Troicki	4	3
(Switzerland) Stéphane Bohli	6	6
WC	(United Kingdom) James Auckland	3	6^{3}
32	(Italy) Simone Bolelli	6	7^{7}

Second round
12	(Italy) Stefano Galvani	6	6
(Australia) Alun Jones	3	1
(Switzerland) Stéphane Bohli	6^{3}	3
32	(Italy) Simone Bolelli	7^{7}	6

Qualifying competition
12	(Italy) Stefano Galvani	6	6	7
32	(Italy) Simone Bolelli	1	4	5

=== Thirteenth qualifier ===
First round
13	(France) Jean-Christophe Faurel	6	0
(United States) Hugo Armando	1	0^{r}
(Chile) Adrián García	6	6
PR	(Argentina) Marcelo Charpentier	2	3
(Australia) Luke Bourgeois	4	6^{2}
(Australia) Wayne Arthurs	6	7^{7}
(France) Nicolas Thomann	6	6^{7}	4
24	(Australia) Peter Luczak	4	7^{9}	6

Second round
13	(France) Jean-Christophe Faurel	6	6
(Chile) Adrián García	2	1
(Australia) Wayne Arthurs	7^{13}	6
24	(Australia) Peter Luczak	6^{11}	2

Qualifying competition
13	(France) Jean-Christophe Faurel	6	3	4	4
(Australia) Wayne Arthurs	4	6	6	6

=== Fourteenth qualifier ===
First round
14	(Italy) Flavio Cipolla	6	6
(Netherlands) Melvyn op der Heijde	2	1
(Czech Republic) Jan Mertl	6	6^{6}	3
WC	(United Kingdom) Colin Fleming	4	7^{8}	6
(Venezuela) Yohny Romero	6	3	2
(Germany) Benedikt Dorsch	4	6	6
(Japan) Toshihide Matsui	4	6	3
26	(France) Antony Dupuis	6	1	1^{r}

Second round
14	(Italy) Flavio Cipolla	6	6
WC	(United Kingdom) Colin Fleming	2	4
(Germany) Benedikt Dorsch	6	6^{4}	6
(Japan) Toshihide Matsui	2	7^{7}	3

Qualifying competition
14	(Italy) Flavio Cipolla	3	2	4
(Germany) Benedikt Dorsch	6	6	6

=== Fifteenth qualifier ===
First round
15	(Germany) Lars Burgsmüller	6	6
(Sweden) Jacob Adaktusson	4	4
(Australia) Nathan Healey	6	6
(United States) Lesley Joseph	4	1
(United States) Robert Kendrick	6	6
(Ghana) Henry Adjei-Darko	3	3
(India) Rohan Bopanna	6	6
25	(Czech Republic) Tomáš Cakl	3	4

Second round
15	(Germany) Lars Burgsmüller	3^{r}
(Australia) Nathan Healey	5
(United States) Robert Kendrick	6	6
(India) Rohan Bopanna	4	4

Qualifying competition
(Australia) Nathan Healey	3	3	5
(United States) Robert Kendrick	6	6	7

=== Sixteenth qualifier ===
First round
16	(Serbia) Ilija Bozoljac	6	4	6
WC	(United Kingdom) Lee Childs	4	6	4
(Monaco) Benjamin Balleret	1	3
(Switzerland) Ivo Heuberger	6	6
(Italy) Massimo Dell'Acqua	1	6^{4}
(India) Prakash Amritraj	6	7^{7}
(Germany) Benjamin Becker	7^{9}	6
28	(France) Nicolas Devilder	6^{7}	3

Second round
16	(Serbia) Ilija Bozoljac	6^{5}	3
(Switzerland) Ivo Heuberger	7^{7}	6
(India) Prakash Amritraj	5	6^{4}
(Germany) Benjamin Becker	7	7^{7}

Qualifying competition
(Switzerland) Ivo Heuberger	3	2	6^{1}
(Germany) Benjamin Becker	6	6	7^{7}
