= 2006 Wimbledon Championships – Boys' singles =

Boys' singles
- 2006 Wimbledon Championships

Final
- Champion: (Netherlands) Thiemo de Bakker
- Runner-up: (Poland) Marcin Gawron
- Score: 6–2, 7–6^{(7–4)}

Details
- Draw: 64 (8Q / 8WC)
- Seeds: 16

Events
Singles	men	women		boys	girls
Doubles	men	women	mixed	boys	girls
WC Singles	men	women	quad
WC Doubles	men	women	quad
Legends	men	women	seniors
- Wimbledon Championships

Thiemo de Bakker defeated Marcin Gawron in the final, 6–2, 7–6^{(7–4)} to win the boys' singles tennis title at the 2006 Wimbledon Championships.

Jérémy Chardy was the defending champion, but was no longer eligible to compete in junior events.

== Seeds ==
1. (Netherlands) Thiemo de Bakker (champion)
2. (Slovakia) Martin Kližan (first round)
3. (United States) Donald Young (third round)
4. (France) Alexandre Sidorenko (first round)
5. (Brazil) Nicolas Santos (first round)
6. (Croatia) Luka Belić (quarterfinals)
7. (Romania) Petru-Alexandru Luncanu (third round)
8. (India) Sanam Singh (third round)
9. (Ukraine) Ivan Sergeyev (first round)
10. (Chinese Taipei) Lee Hsin-han (third round)
11. (Japan) Sho Aida (first round)
12. (Russia) Artur Chernov (quarterfinals)
13. (Czech Republic) Roman Jebavý (first round)
14. (India) Jeevan Nedunchezhiyan (first round)
15. (Switzerland) Robin Roshardt (quarterfinals)
16. (Brazil) Daniel Dutra da Silva (second round)

Click on the seed number of a player to go to their draw section.

== Draw ==
Key

- Q = Qualifier
- WC = Wild card
- LL = Lucky loser
- Alt = Alternate
- ITF = ITF entry
- PR = Protected ranking
- SR = Special ranking
- SE = Special exempt
- JE = Junior exempt
- JR = Junior Accelerator Programme entrant
- CO = College Accelerator Programme entrant
- NG = Next Gen Accelerator Program entrant
- w/o = Walkover
- r = Retired
- d = Defaulted

=== Finals ===
Quarterfinals
1	(Netherlands) Thiemo de Bakker	6	6
12	(Russia) Artur Chernov	2	2
15	(Switzerland) Robin Roshardt	0^{r}
(Czech Republic) Michal Konečný	3
6	(Croatia) Luka Belić	4	4
(Russia) Pavel Chekhov	6	6
Q	(Poland) Marcin Gawron	6	6
(Croatia) Nikola Mektić	3	4

Semifinals
1	(Netherlands) Thiemo de Bakker	7	6
(Czech Republic) Michal Konečný	5	4
(Russia) Pavel Chekhov	6^{3}	6^{8}
Q	(Poland) Marcin Gawron	7	7

Final
1	(Netherlands) Thiemo de Bakker	6	7
Q	(Poland) Marcin Gawron	2	6^{4}

=== Top half ===
==== Section 1 ====
First round
1	(Netherlands) Thiemo de Bakker	6	6
(China) Bai Yan	1	0
Q	(Portugal) Gastão Elias	4	3
(Croatia) Antonio Veić	6	6
WC	(United Kingdom) David Rice	6^{5}	3
(Argentina) Emiliano Massa	7^{7}	6
WC	(Lebanon) Bassam Beidas	5	3
16/WC	(Brazil) Daniel Dutra da Silva	7	6
12	(Russia) Artur Chernov	3	6	6
(France) Kevin Botti	6	4	4
(United States) Jamie Hunt	6	5	6
(Australia) James Lemke	3	7	3
(Greece) Paris Gemouchidis	4	2
SE	(Spain) Roberto Bautista Agut	6	6
(Venezuela) Roberto Maytín	1	2
8	(India) Sanam Singh	6	6

Second round
1	(Netherlands) T de Bakker	6	4	6
(Croatia) A Veić	3	6	3
(Argentina) E Massa	6	4	6
16/WC	(Brazil) D Dutra da Silva	4	6	2
12	(Russia) A Chernov	6	6
(United States) J Hunt	2	4
SE	(Spain) R Bautista Agut	4	6	4
8	(India) S Singh	6	3	6

Third round
1	(Netherlands) T de Bakker	6^{2}	6	6
(Argentina) E Massa	7^{7}	3	4
12	(Russia) A Chernov	6	6
8	(India) S Singh	2	3

Quarterfinals
1	(Netherlands) T de Bakker	6	6
12	(Russia) A Chernov	2	2

==== Section 2 ====
First round
3/WC	(United States) Donald Young	6	7^{7}
WC	(United Kingdom) Iain Atkinson	2	6^{2}
(Spain) Albert Ramos Viñolas	6	3	6
(Indonesia) Faisal Aidil	4	6	0
(Paraguay) Daniel Alejandro López	6	6
(Chile) Hans Podlipnik-Castillo	3	4
(Poland) Grzegorz Panfil	3	5
15	(Switzerland) Robin Roshardt	6	7
9	(Ukraine) Ivan Sergeyev	3	3
(Czech Republic) Michal Konečný	6	6
(Slovakia) Andrej Martin	6	7
(India) Rupesh Roy	2	5
(Australia) Brydan Klein	6	6
(United States) Dennis Lajola	3	1
Q	(Bolivia) José Roberto Velasco	1	7	3
7	(Romania) Petru-Alexandru Luncanu	6	5	6

Second round
3	(United States) D Young	6	6
(Spain) A Ramos Viñolas	1	4
(Paraguay) DA López	6	6^{4}	5
15	(Switzerland) R Roshardt	3	7^{7}	7
(Czech Republic) M Konečný	6	6
(Slovakia) A Martin	2	4
(Australia) B Klein	4	0
7	(Romania) P-A Luncanu	6	6

Third round
3	(United States) D Young	4	6^{7}
15	(Switzerland) R Roshardt	6	7^{9}
(Czech Republic) M Konečný	6	6
7	(Romania) P-A Luncanu	3	2

Quarterfinals
15	(Switzerland) R Roshardt	0^{r}
(Czech Republic) M Konečný	3

=== Bottom half ===
==== Section 3 ====
First round
6	(Croatia) Luka Belić	6	6
(Australia) Stephen Donald	2	1
WC	(United Kingdom) Graeme Dyce	6^{4}	4
(United States) Clint Bowles	7^{7}	6
(Poland) Błażej Koniusz	3	0
Q	(China) Xu Junchao	6	6
(Kenya) Christian Vitulli	3	6^{6}
10	(Chinese Taipei) Lee Hsin-han	6	7^{8}
14	(India) Jeevan Nedunchezhiyan	0	7^{7}	1
WC	(United Kingdom) Edward Corrie	6	6^{4}	6
Q	(Australia) John-Patrick Smith	4	6	2
(Netherlands) Peter Lucassen	6	2	6
(Canada) Philip Bester	6^{9}	6	7
(Spain) Javier Garrapiz-Borderías	7^{11}	3	5
(Russia) Pavel Chekhov	1	6	6
4	(France) Alexandre Sidorenko	6	3	4

Second round
6	(Croatia) L Belić	6	7^{8}
(United States) C Bowles	2	6^{6}
(China) J Xu	5	2
10	(Chinese Taipei) H-h Lee	7	6
(United Kingdom) E Corrie	7^{7}	4	4
(Netherlands) P Lucassen	6^{5}	6	6
(Canada) P Bester	4	7^{7}	3
(Russia) P Chekhov	6	6^{3}	6

Third round
6	(Croatia) L Belić	6	6
10	(Chinese Taipei) H-h Lee	2	4
(Netherlands) P Lucassen	4	7	2
(Russia) P Chekhov	6	5	6

Quarterfinals
6	(Croatia) L Belić	4	4
(Russia) P Chekhov	6	6

==== Section 4 ====
First round
5	(Brazil) Nicolas Santos	5	4
Q	(Poland) Marcin Gawron	7	6
(United States) Kellen Damico	6	6
(Italy) Thomas Fabbiano	4	4
(Australia) Greg Jones	6	6
Q	(Chile) Ricardo Urzúa-Rivera	1	1
Q	(Switzerland) Dylan Sessagesimi	6	6
11	(Japan) Sho Aida	3	3
13	(Czech Republic) Roman Jebavý	5	4
(Portugal) Pedro Sousa	7	6
(Croatia) Nikola Mektić	6	5	6
(United States) Nathaniel Schnugg	1	7	1
WC	(United Kingdom) Daniel Cox	6	4	6
Q	(Colombia) Edgar Rodriguez	1	6	3
(Estonia) Jaak Põldma	6	3	6
2	(Slovakia) Martin Kližan	3	6	3

Second round
Q	(Poland) M Gawron	6	3	6
(United States) K Damico	4	6	3
(Australia) G Jones	7^{7}	2	6
Q	(Switzerland) D Sessagesimi	6^{4}	6	3
(Portugal) P Sousa	5	2
(Croatia) N Mektić	7	6
WC	(United Kingdom) D Cox	7	4	3
(Estonia) J Põldma	5	6	6

Third round
Q	(Poland) M Gawron	6^{4}	6	10
(Australia) G Jones	7^{7}	4	8
(Croatia) N Mektić	6	5	6
(Estonia) J Põldma	3	7	3

Quarterfinals
Q	(Poland) M Gawron	6	6
(Croatia) N Mektić	3	4
