= 2006 French Open – Boys' doubles =

Boys' doubles
- 2006 French Open

Final
- Champion: (Argentina) Emiliano Massa (Japan) Kei Nishikori
- Runner-up: (Russia) Artur Chernov (Russia) Valery Rudnev
- Score: 2–6, 6–1, 6–2

Events
Singles	men	women		boys	girls
Doubles	men	women	mixed	boys	girls
WC Singles	men	women	quad
WC Doubles	men	women	quad
Legends	−45	45+	women
- French Open

Emiliano Massa and Kei Nishikori won the title, defeating Artur Chernov and Valery Rudnev in the final, 2–6, 6–1, 6–2.

== Seeds ==
1. (Netherlands) Thiemo de Bakker / (France) Alexandre Sidorenko (second round)
2. (Croatia) Luka Belić / (Croatia) Antonio Veić (semifinals)
3. (United States) Jamie Hunt / (United States) Donald Young (second round)
4. (Greece) Paris Gemouchidis / (Brazil) Nicolas Santos (quarterfinals)
5. (Czech Republic) Roman Jebavý / (Chile) Hans Podlipnik Castillo (quarterfinals)
6. (United States) Kellen Damico / (Romania) Petru-Alexandru Luncanu (second round)
7. (India) Jeevan Nedunchezhiyan / (India) Sanam Singh (first round)
8. (Estonia) Jaak Põldma / (Ukraine) Ivan Sergeyev (second round)

== Draw ==
Key

- Q = Qualifier
- WC = Wild card
- LL = Lucky loser
- Alt = Alternate
- ITF = ITF entry
- PR = Protected ranking
- SR = Special ranking
- SE = Special exempt
- JE = Junior exempt
- JR = Junior Accelerator Programme entrant
- CO = College Accelerator Programme entrant
- NG = Next Gen Accelerator Program entrant
- w/o = Walkover
- r = Retired
- d = Defaulted

=== Finals ===
Semifinals
(Argentina) Emiliano Massa (Japan) Kei Nishikori	4	6	6
(Croatia) Nikola Mektić (Croatia) Vedran Siljegovic	6	4	4
(Russia) Artur Chernov (Russia) Valery Rudnev	6	6
2	(Croatia) Luka Belić (Croatia) Antonio Veić	3	2

Final
(Argentina) Emiliano Massa (Japan) Kei Nishikori	2	6	6
(Russia) Artur Chernov (Russia) Valery Rudnev	6	1	2

=== Top half ===
First round
1	(Netherlands) Thiemo de Bakker (France) Alexandre Sidorenko	6	6
(Brazil) Daniel Dutra da Silva (Chile) Ricardo Urzua-Rivera	3	2
(Italy) Thomas Fabbiano (Italy) Daniel-Alejandro López	6	7^{8}
(Venezuela) Roberto Maytín (Kenya) Christian Vitulli	3	6^{6}
(Australia) Stephen Donald (Australia) Brydan Klein	4	4
(Argentina) Emiliano Massa (Japan) Kei Nishikori	6	6
WC	(France) Jonathan Eysseric (France) Jérôme Inzerillo	6	2	1
6	(United States) Kellen Damico (Romania) Petru-Alexandru Luncanu	4	6	6
4	(Greece) Paris Gemouchidis (Brazil) Nicolas Santos	6	2	8
(Spain) Roberto Bautista Agut (Spain) Albert Ramos	2	6	6
(Netherlands) Peter Lucassen (Portugal) Pedro Sousa	6^{3}	3
(United States) Clint Bowles (United States) Johnny Hamui	7^{7}	6
WC	(France) Kevin Botti (France) Vincent Sapene	3	3
(Slovakia) Martin Kližan (Slovakia) Andrej Martin	6	6
(Croatia) Nikola Mektić (Croatia) Vedran Siljegovic	7^{7}	6
7	(India) Jeevan Nedunchezhiyan (India) Sanam Singh	6^{2}	4

Second round
1	(Netherlands) T de Bakker (France) A Sidorenko	6	1	4
(Italy) T Fabbiano (Italy) D-A López	3	6	6
(Argentina) E Massa (Japan) K Nishikori	6	6
6	(United States) K Damico (Romania) P-A Luncanu	2	3
4	(Greece) P Gemouchidis (Brazil) N Santos	6	7^{8}
(United States) C Bowles (United States) J Hamui	3	6^{6}
(Slovakia) M Kližan (Slovakia) A Martin	5	1
(Croatia) N Mektić (Croatia) V Siljegovic	7	6

Quarterfinals
(Italy) T Fabbiano (Italy) D-A López	6	1	4
(Argentina) E Massa (Japan) K Nishikori	3	6	6
4	(Greece) P Gemouchidis (Brazil) N Santos	0	4
(Croatia) N Mektić (Croatia) V Siljegovic	6	6

Semifinals
(Argentina) E Massa (Japan) K Nishikori	4	6	6
(Croatia) N Mektić (Croatia) V Siljegovic	6	4	4

=== Bottom half ===
First round
8	(Estonia) Jaak Põldma (Ukraine) Ivan Sergeyev	6	7
(Indonesia) Faisal Aidil (Lebanon) Bassam Beidas	3	5
(Switzerland) Robin Roshardt (Switzerland) Dylan Sessagesimi	6^{4}	2
(Russia) Artur Chernov (Russia) Valery Rudnev	7^{7}	6
(Australia) Greg Jones (Czech Republic) Michal Konecny	6^{3}	6	7
WC	(France) Boris Obama (France) Stéphane Piro	7^{7}	4	5
(Poland) Marcin Gawron (Poland) Błażej Koniusz	5	6	1
3	(United States) Jamie Hunt (United States) Donald Young	7	1	6
5	(Czech Republic) Roman Jebavý (Chile) Hans Podlipnik Castillo	6	6
(Japan) Sho Aida (Australia) James Lemke	3	3
(United States) Dennis Lajola (Chinese Taipei) Hsin-Han Lee	6	6
WC	(France) Axel Michon (France) Guillaume Rufin	4	4
(Belgium) Ruben Bemelmans (Sweden) Tim Göransson	4	7^{7}	1
(China) Yan Bai (China) Xu Junchao	6	6^{5}	6
(Spain) Javier Garrapiz-Borderías (Spain) Pere Riba	7^{7}	5	1
2	(Croatia) Luka Belić (Croatia) Antonio Veić	6^{2}	7	6

Second round
8	(Estonia) J Põldma (Ukraine) I Sergeyev	6	4	2
(Russia) A Chernov (Russia) V Rudnev	2	6	6
(Australia) G Jones (Czech Republic) M Konecny	3	6	7
3	(United States) J Hunt (United States) D Young	6	3	5
5	(Czech Republic) R Jebavý (Chile) H Podlipnik-Castillo	6	5	7
(United States) D Lajola (Chinese Taipei) H-H Lee	2	7	5
(China) Y Bai (China) J-C Xu	0	6^{5}
2	(Croatia) L Belić (Croatia) A Veić	6	7^{7}

Quarterfinals
(Russia) A Chernov (Russia) V Rudnev	6	6
(Australia) G Jones (Czech Republic) M Konecny	4	3
5	(Czech Republic) R Jebavý (Chile) H Podlipnik-Castillo	6^{1}	7^{9}	5
2	(Croatia) L Belić (Croatia) A Veić	7^{7}	6^{7}	7

Semifinals
(Russia) A Chernov (Russia) V Rudnev	6	6
2	(Croatia) L Belić (Croatia) A Veić	3	2

== Sources ==
- Draw
