= 2006 Wimbledon Championships – Women's singles qualifying =

Women's singles qualifying
- 2006 Wimbledon Championships

Details
- Draw: 96
- Seeds: 26

Events
Singles	men	women		boys	girls
Doubles	men	women	mixed	boys	girls
WC Singles	men	women	quad
WC Doubles	men	women	quad
Legends	men	women	seniors

Qualification
Singles	men	women
Doubles	men	women
- Wimbledon Championships

Players and pairs who neither have high enough rankings nor receive wild cards may participate in a qualifying tournament held one week before the annual Wimbledon Tennis Championships.

== Seeds ==
1. (Italy) Romina Oprandi (qualified)
2. (Ukraine) Julia Vakulenko (qualifying competition, lucky loser)
3. (Czech Republic) Kateřina Böhmová (withdrew)
4. (France) Aravane Rezaï (first round)
5. (Chinese Taipei) Hsieh Su-wei (moved to main draw)
6. (Argentina) María Emilia Salerni (second round)
7. (Czech Republic) Zuzana Ondrášková (qualifying competition)
8. (Russia) Vasilisa Bardina (qualified)
9. (Venezuela) María Vento-Kabchi (first round)
10. (Russia) Galina Voskoboeva (qualifying competition)
11. (Belarus) Tatiana Poutchek (qualifying competition)
12. (Belgium) Kirsten Flipkens (qualified)
13. (Ukraine) Yuliya Beygelzimer (second round)
14. (Russia) Lioudmila Skavronskaia (first round)
15. (Romania) Anda Perianu (first round)
16. (Russia) Olga Puchkova (qualifying competition)
17. (Australia) Nicole Pratt (qualified)
18. (United States) Meilen Tu (qualified)
19. (Austria) Yvonne Meusburger (first round)
20. (France) Mathilde Johansson (first round)
21. (Germany) Kathrin Wörle (first round)
22. (Spain) Arantxa Parra Santonja (second round)
23. (Canada) Aleksandra Wozniak (first round)
24. (Venezuela) Milagros Sequera (second round)
25. (France) Séverine Brémond (qualified)
26. (United States) Ahsha Rolle (second round)

== Qualifiers ==
1. (Italy) Romina Oprandi
2. (Australia) Nicole Pratt
3. (France) Séverine Brémond
4. (Thailand) Tamarine Tanasugarn
5. (Argentina) Clarisa Fernández
6. (Germany) Kristina Barrois
7. (Chinese Taipei) Chan Yung-jan
8. (Russia) Vasilisa Bardina
9. (Croatia) Ivana Abramović
10. (United States) Meilen Tu
11. (Russia) Yaroslava Shvedova
12. (Belgium) Kirsten Flipkens

== Lucky loser ==
1. (Ukraine) Julia Vakulenko

== Qualifying draw ==
=== First qualifier ===
First round
1	(Italy) Romina Oprandi	7	6
(Italy) Sara Errani	5	2
(Chinese Taipei) Chan Chin-wei	6	2	6
(South Africa) Natalie Grandin	3	6	2
(Puerto Rico) Vilmarie Castellvi	6	6
(Germany) Vanessa Henke	3	3
(Hungary) Zsófia Gubacsi	4	2
22	(Spain) Arantxa Parra Santonja	6	6

Second round
1	(Italy) Romina Oprandi	6	7^{7}
(Chinese Taipei) Chan Chin-wei	4	6^{1}
(Puerto Rico) Vilmarie Castellvi	6	6
22	(Spain) Arantxa Parra Santonja	3	1

Qualifying competition
1	(Italy) Romina Oprandi	6	6
(Puerto Rico) Vilmarie Castellvi	2	1

=== Second qualifier ===
First round
2	(Ukraine) Julia Vakulenko	6	5	6
(Japan) Seiko Okamoto	0	7	1
Alt	(Czech Republic) Eva Hrdinová	6^{3}	6	7
(Italy) Valentina Sassi	7^{7}	3	9
Alt	(Croatia) Nika Ožegović	4	6	2
(United States) Jessica Kirkland	6	4	6
WC	(United Kingdom) Amanda Keen	5	4
17	(Australia) Nicole Pratt	7	6

Second round
2	(Ukraine) Julia Vakulenko	6	6
(Italy) Valentina Sassi	2	4
(United States) Jessica Kirkland	3	4
17	(Australia) Nicole Pratt	6	6

Qualifying competition
2	(Ukraine) Julia Vakulenko	4	2
17	(Australia) Nicole Pratt	6	6

=== Third qualifier ===
First round
25	(France) Séverine Brémond	6	7
(Netherlands) Elise Tamaëla	3	5
(Czech Republic) Michaela Paštiková	6	7^{7}
(Sweden) Hanna Nooni	2	6^{1}
(Estonia) Margit Rüütel	6	6
WC	(United Kingdom) Karen Paterson	2	0
(Luxembourg) Claudine Schaul	6	7^{7}
15	(Romania) Anda Perianu	4	6^{1}

Second round
25	(France) Séverine Brémond	6	6
(Czech Republic) Michaela Paštiková	4	2
(Estonia) Margit Rüütel	2	3
(Luxembourg) Claudine Schaul	6	6

Qualifying competition
25	(France) Séverine Brémond	6	6
(Luxembourg) Claudine Schaul	4	2

=== Fourth qualifier ===
First round
4	(France) Aravane Rezaï	3	0
(Thailand) Tamarine Tanasugarn	6	6
(Russia) Tatiana Panova	3	6	6
(Poland) Joanna Sakowicz	6	4	2
(Slovakia) Dominika Nociarová	2	1
(Portugal) Frederica Piedade	6	6
(Thailand) Suchanun Viratprasert	3	4
13	(Ukraine) Yuliya Beygelzimer	6	6

Second round
(Thailand) Tamarine Tanasugarn	6	6
(Russia) Tatiana Panova	2	1
(Portugal) Frederica Piedade	7	7^{7}
13	(Ukraine) Yuliya Beygelzimer	5	6^{3}

Qualifying competition
(Thailand) Tamarine Tanasugarn	6	6
(Portugal) Frederica Piedade	3	0

=== Fifth qualifier ===
First round
26	(United States) Ahsha Rolle	6	0	6
(United States) Sunitha Rao	4	6	2
(Argentina) Clarisa Fernández	7	6
(Italy) Alberta Brianti	5	4
(Bosnia and Herzegovina) Mervana Jugić-Salkić	6	4	6
(Serbia) Ana Timotić	2	6	2
(Spain) María José Martínez Sánchez	4	6	6
14	(Russia) Lioudmila Skavronskaia	6	1	4

Second round
26	(United States) Ahsha Rolle	3	4
(Argentina) Clarisa Fernández	6	6
(Bosnia and Herzegovina) Mervana Jugić-Salkić	2	5
(Spain) María José Martínez Sánchez	6	7

Qualifying competition
(Argentina) Clarisa Fernández	7	7^{7}
(Spain) María José Martínez Sánchez	5	6^{3}

=== Sixth qualifier ===
First round
6	(Argentina) María Emilia Salerni	6	6
(France) Pauline Parmentier	4	0
(Germany) Kristina Barrois	6	7^{7}
(Slovakia) Ľudmila Cervanová	2	6^{5}
(Germany) Sabine Klaschka	6^{1}	6	6
(Czech Republic) Sandra Záhlavová	7^{7}	0	1
(Romania) Edina Gallovits	4	6	6
20	(France) Mathilde Johansson	6	3	3

Second round
6	(Argentina) María Emilia Salerni	6	4	3
(Germany) Kristina Barrois	4	6	6
(Germany) Sabine Klaschka	3	7^{8}	6
(Romania) Edina Gallovits	6	6^{6}	4

Qualifying competition
(Germany) Kristina Barrois	6	3	6
(Germany) Sabine Klaschka	2	6	1

=== Seventh qualifier ===
First round
7	(Czech Republic) Zuzana Ondrášková	6	6
(Czech Republic) Olga Blahotová	4	4
(India) Shikha Uberoi	6	6
(Israel) Tzipora Obziler	4	4
(Japan) Miho Saeki	3	6	6
WC	(Denmark) Caroline Wozniacki	6	2	3
(Chinese Taipei) Chan Yung-jan	6	6
21	(Germany) Kathrin Wörle	2	0

Second round
7	(Czech Republic) Zuzana Ondrášková	6	6
(India) Shikha Uberoi	3	2
(Japan) Miho Saeki	2	1
(Chinese Taipei) Chan Yung-jan	6	6

Qualifying competition
7	(Czech Republic) Zuzana Ondrášková	3	6	2
(Chinese Taipei) Chan Yung-jan	6	3	6

=== Eighth qualifier ===
First round
8	(Russia) Vasilisa Bardina	6	6
PR	(China) Li Ting	1	2
(Uzbekistan) Akgul Amanmuradova	6	7
(Argentina) Natalia Gussoni	4	5
(Austria) Daniela Kix	7^{8}	1	5
WC	(United Kingdom) Jane O'Donoghue	6^{6}	6	7
(Czech Republic) Barbora Strýcová	6	6
23	(Canada) Aleksandra Wozniak	2	4

Second round
8	(Russia) Vasilisa Bardina	1	6	6
(Uzbekistan) Akgul Amanmuradova	6	2	3
WC	(United Kingdom) Jane O'Donoghue	6^{5}	6^{6}
(Czech Republic) Barbora Strýcová	7^{7}	7^{8}

Qualifying competition
8	(Russia) Vasilisa Bardina	6	6
(Czech Republic) Barbora Strýcová	3	2

=== Ninth qualifier ===
First round
9	(Venezuela) María Vento-Kabchi	2	5
(Czech Republic) Petra Cetkovská	6	7
(Canada) Stéphanie Dubois	3	3
WC	(Croatia) Ivana Abramović	6	6
(France) Stéphanie Cohen-Aloro	6	6
WC	(United Kingdom) Georgie Stoop	2	2
(Ukraine) Olena Schmelzer	4	1
24	(Venezuela) Milagros Sequera	6	6

Second round
(Czech Republic) Petra Cetkovská	3	6	2
WC	(Croatia) Ivana Abramović	6	3	6
(France) Stéphanie Cohen-Aloro	6	7
24	(Venezuela) Milagros Sequera	4	5

Qualifying competition
WC	(Croatia) Ivana Abramović	6	2	7
(France) Stéphanie Cohen-Aloro	2	6	5

=== Tenth qualifier ===
First round
10	(Russia) Galina Voskoboeva	6	7^{7}
(Australia) Casey Dellacqua	3	6^{5}
(United States) Tiffany Dabek	5	0
WC	(United Kingdom) Sarah Coles	7	6
(Japan) Shiho Hisamatsu	2	7	5
(Argentina) María José Argeri	6	5	7
(Tunisia) Selima Sfar	1	4
18	(United States) Meilen Tu	6	6

Second round
10	(Russia) Galina Voskoboeva	6	7
WC	(United Kingdom) Sarah Coles	4	5
(Argentina) María José Argeri	1	4
18	(United States) Meilen Tu	6	6

Qualifying competition
10	(Russia) Galina Voskoboeva	2	0
18	(United States) Meilen Tu	6	6

=== Eleventh qualifier ===
First round
11	(Belarus) Tatiana Poutchek	6	6
(Germany) Angelika Bachmann	1	3
PR	(United States) Alexandra Stevenson	4	7^{7}	6
WC	(Australia) Jelena Dokic	6	6^{4}	2
(Russia) Alla Kudryavtseva	6^{4}	6	7
(Ukraine) Tatiana Perebiynis	7^{7}	0	9
(Russia) Yaroslava Shvedova	6	6
19	(Austria) Yvonne Meusburger	3	4

Second round
11	(Belarus) Tatiana Poutchek	6	4	6
PR	(United States) Alexandra Stevenson	4	6	2
(Ukraine) Tatiana Perebiynis	7	6^{5}	2
(Russia) Yaroslava Shvedova	5	7^{7}	6

Qualifying competition
11	(Belarus) Tatiana Poutchek	4	1
(Russia) Yaroslava Shvedova	6	6

=== Twelfth qualifier ===
First round
12	(Belgium) Kirsten Flipkens	6	6
(Hungary) Kira Nagy	0	1
(Brazil) Maria Fernanda Alves	1	0
(France) Virginie Pichet	6	6
Alt	(Ukraine) Oxana Lyubtsova	6	3	7
(Czech Republic) Lucie Hradecká	4	6	5
(Slovakia) Henrieta Nagyová	3	6	4
16	(Russia) Olga Puchkova	6	2	6

Second round
12	(Belgium) Kirsten Flipkens	6	7^{7}
(France) Virginie Pichet	4	6^{2}
Alt	(Ukraine) Oxana Lyubtsova	2	0
16	(Russia) Olga Puchkova	6	6

Qualifying competition
12	(Belgium) Kirsten Flipkens	7	7
16	(Russia) Olga Puchkova	5	5
