= 2006 Wimbledon Championships – Boys' doubles =

Boys' doubles
- 2006 Wimbledon Championships

Final
- Champions: (United States) Kellen Damico (United States) Nathaniel Schnugg
- Runners-up: (Slovakia) Martin Kližan (Slovakia) Andrej Martin
- Score: 7–6^{(9–7)}, 6–2

Events
Singles	men	women		boys	girls
Doubles	men	women	mixed	boys	girls
WC Singles	men	women	quad
WC Doubles	men	women	quad
Legends	men	women	seniors
- Wimbledon Championships

Jesse Levine and Michael Shabaz were the defending champions, but both players were no longer eligible to compete in the juniors.

Kellen Damico and Nathaniel Schnugg defeated Martin Kližan and Andrej Martin in the final, 7–6^{(9–7)}, 6–2 to win the boys' doubles tennis title at the 2006 Wimbledon Championships.

== Seeds ==
1. (Netherlands) Thiemo de Bakker / (France) Alexandre Sidorenko (first round)
2. (Slovakia) Martin Kližan / (Slovakia) Andrej Martin (final)
3. (Croatia) Luka Belić / (Croatia) Antonio Veić (quarterfinals)
4. (India) Jeevan Nedunchezhiyan / (India) Sanam Singh (first round)
5. (Japan) Sho Aida / (Russia) Artur Chernov (first round)
6. (Czech Republic) Roman Jebavý / (Chile) Hans Podlipnik-Castillo (first round)
7. (Canada) Philip Bester / (Switzerland) Robin Roshardt (first round)
8. (Estonia) Jaak Põldma / (Ukraine) Ivan Sergeyev (first round)

== Draw ==
Key

- Q = Qualifier
- WC = Wild card
- LL = Lucky loser
- Alt = Alternate
- ITF = ITF entry
- PR = Protected ranking
- SR = Special ranking
- SE = Special exempt
- JE = Junior exempt
- JR = Junior Accelerator Programme entrant
- CO = College Accelerator Programme entrant
- NG = Next Gen Accelerator Program entrant
- w/o = Walkover
- r = Retired
- d = Defaulted

=== Finals ===
Semifinals
(United States) Kellen Damico (United States) Nathaniel Schnugg	6	3	6
(Croatia) Nikola Mektić (Croatia) Vedran Šiljegović	3	6	0
(Chinese Taipei) Lee Hsin-han (India) Rupesh Roy	3	7^{7}	3
2	(Slovakia) Martin Kližan (Slovakia) Andrej Martin	6	6^{4}	6

Final
(United States) Kellen Damico (United States) Nathaniel Schnugg	7^{9}	6
2	(Slovakia) Martin Kližan (Slovakia) Andrej Martin	6^{7}	2

=== Top half ===
First round
1	(Netherlands) Thiemo de Bakker (France) Alexandre Sidorenko	4	6	5
(United States) Kellen Damico (United States) Nathaniel Schnugg	6	3	7
(Italy) Thomas Fabbiano (Paraguay) Daniel Alejandro López	6	6^{6}	3
(Australia) Brydan Klein (Australia) John-Patrick Smith	4	7^{8}	6
(France) Kevin Botti (Switzerland) Dylan Sessagesimi	6^{5}	4
WC	(United Kingdom) David Rice (United Kingdom) Darren Walsh	7^{7}	6
(Portugal) Gastão Elias (Portugal) Pedro Sousa	2	7	9
8	(Estonia) Jaak Põldma (Ukraine) Ivan Sergeyev	6	5	7
4	(India) Jeevan Nedunchezhiyan (India) Sanam Singh	6^{4}	4
(Croatia) Nikola Mektić (Croatia) Vedran Šiljegović	7^{7}	6
(China) Bai Yan (Brazil) Nicolas Santos	7	3	5
(Indonesia) Faisal Aidil (China) Xu Junchao	5	6	7
(United States) Dennis Lajola (Kenya) Christian Vitulli	6	6
WC	(United Kingdom) Daniel Cox (United Kingdom) Graeme Dyce	2	3
WC	(Brazil) Fernando Romboli (Brazil) Daniel Dutra da Silva	4	6	6
7	(Canada) Philip Bester (Switzerland) Robin Roshardt	6	4	4

Second round
(United States) K Damico (United States) N Schnugg	3	6	6
(Australia) B Klein (Australia) J-P Smith	6	3	4
WC	(United Kingdom) D Rice (United Kingdom) D Walsh	1	4
(Portugal) G Elias (Portugal) P Sousa	6	6
(Croatia) N Mektić (Croatia) V Šiljegović	6	6
(Indonesia) F Aidil (China) J Xu	4	3
(United States) D Lajola (Kenya) C Vitulli	7	1
WC	(Brazil) R Romboli (Brazil) D Dutra da Silva	5	0^{r}

Quarterfinals
(United States) K Damico (United States) N Schnugg	6^{3}	6	6
(Portugal) G Elias (Portugal) P Sousa	7^{7}	4	3
(Croatia) N Mektić (Croatia) V Šiljegović	6	6
(United States) D Lajola (Kenya) C Vitulli	4	4

Semifinals
(United States) K Damico (United States) N Schnugg	6	3	6
(Croatia) N Mektić (Croatia) V Šiljegović	3	6	0

=== Bottom half ===
First round
5	(Japan) Sho Aida (Russia) Artur Chernov	6	3	4
(Colombia) Edgar Rodriguez (Bolivia) José Roberto Velasco	1	6	6
(Chinese Taipei) Lee Hsin-han (India) Rupesh Roy	6	6
WC	(United Kingdom) Scott Dickson (United Kingdom) Christopher Llewellyn	2	3
(Lebanon) Bassam Beidas (Poland) Marcin Gawron	1	4
(United States) Jamie Hunt (Venezuela) Roberto Maytín	6	6
(Australia) Greg Jones (Australia) James Lemke	7	4	4
3	(Croatia) Luka Belić (Croatia) Antonio Veić	5	6	6
6	(Czech Republic) Roman Jebavý (Chile) Hans Podlipnik-Castillo	4	1
(Australia) Stephen Donald (Czech Republic) Michal Konečný	6	6
(Poland) Błażej Koniusz (Poland) Grzegorz Panfil	5	4
(Spain) Javier Garrapiz-Borderías (Spain) Albert Ramos Viñolas	7	6
(Netherlands) Peter Lucassen (Romania) Petru-Alexandru Luncanu	w/o
(Russia) Pavel Chekhov (Argentina) Emiliano Massa
(Greece) Paris Gemouchidis (Chile) Ricardo Urzúa Rivera	5	5
2	(Slovakia) Martin Kližan (Slovakia) Andrej Martin	7	7

Second round
(Colombia) E Rodriguez (Bolivia) JR Velasco	7^{7}	3	4
(Chinese Taipei) H-h Lee (India) R Roy	6^{2}	6	6
(United States) J Hunt (Venezuela) R Maytín	2	6	2
3	(Croatia) L Belić (Croatia) A Veić	6	2	6
(Australia) S Donald (Czech Republic) M Konečný	6^{6}	7^{7}	7
(Spain) J Garrapiz-Borderías (Spain) A Ramos Viñolas	7^{8}	6^{4}	9
(Netherlands) P Lucassen (Romania) P-A Luncanu	6^{5}	2
2	(Slovakia) M Kližan (Slovakia) A Martin	7^{7}	6

Quarterfinals
(Chinese Taipei) H-h Lee (India) R Roy	7^{7}	6^{4}	6
3	(Croatia) L Belić (Croatia) A Veić	6^{5}	7^{7}	4
(Spain) J Garrapiz-Borderías (Spain) A Ramos Viñolas	4	3
2	(Slovakia) M Kližan (Slovakia) A Martin	6	6

Semifinals
(Chinese Taipei) H-h Lee (India) R Roy	3	7^{7}	3
2	(Slovakia) M Kližan (Slovakia) A Martin	6	6^{4}	6
