= 2006 Wimbledon Championships – Girls' singles =

Girls' singles
- 2006 Wimbledon Championships

Final
- Champion: (Denmark) Caroline Wozniacki
- Runner-up: (Slovakia) Magdaléna Rybáriková
- Score: 3–6, 6–1, 6–3

Details
- Draw: 64 (8 Q / 8 WC )
- Seeds: 16

Events
Singles	men	women		boys	girls
Doubles	men	women	mixed	boys	girls
WC Singles	men	women	quad
WC Doubles	men	women	quad
Legends	men	women	seniors
← 2005 ·	Wimbledon Championships	· 2007 →

Agnieszka Radwańska was the defending champion but did not compete in the Juniors this year.

Caroline Wozniacki defeated Magdaléna Rybáriková in the final, 3–6, 6–1, 6–3 to win the girls' singles tennis title at the 2006 Wimbledon Championships.

== Seeds ==
1. (Russia) Anastasia Pavlyuchenkova (first round)
2. (Chinese Taipei) Chan Yung-jan (third round)
3. (Russia) Alisa Kleybanova (quarterfinals)
4. (Denmark) Caroline Wozniacki (champion)
5. (Romania) Sorana Cîrstea (second round)
6. (Slovakia) Magdaléna Rybáriková (final)
7. (Japan) Ayumi Morita (quarterfinals)
8. (United States) Julia Cohen (second round)
9. (Ukraine) Khrystyna Antoniichuk (third round)
10. (Austria) Tamira Paszek (semifinals)
11. (Belarus) Ksenia Milevskaya (first round)
12. (Brazil) Teliana Pereira (first round)
13. (Czech Republic) Kateřina Vaňková (first round)
14. (New Zealand) Marina Erakovic (first round, retired)
15. (Russia) Evgeniya Rodina (third round)
16. (Romania) Alexandra Dulgheru (quarterfinals)

Click on the seed number of a player to go to their draw section.

== Draw ==
=== Key ===
- Q = Qualifier
- WC = Wild card
- LL = Lucky loser
- Alt = Alternate
- SE = Special exempt
- PR = Protected ranking
- ITF = ITF entry
- JE = Junior exempt
- w/o = Walkover
- r = Retired
- d = Defaulted
- SR = Special ranking

=== Finals ===
Quarterfinals
WC	(United Kingdom) Naomi Cavaday	3	2
(Poland) Urszula Radwańska	6	6
4	(Denmark) Caroline Wozniacki	7^{8}	6
7	(Japan) Ayumi Morita	6^{6}	2
6	(Slovakia) Magdaléna Rybáriková	7	4	6
3	(Russia) Alisa Kleybanova	5	6	3
10	(Austria) Tamira Paszek	6	6
16	(Romania) Alexandra Dulgheru	4	4

Semifinals
(Poland) Urszula Radwańska	6	3	6
4	(Denmark) Caroline Wozniacki	3	6	8
6	(Slovakia) Magdaléna Rybáriková	6	6^{4}	6
10	(Austria) Tamira Paszek	3	7^{7}	3

Final
4	(Denmark) Caroline Wozniacki	3	6	6
6	(Slovakia) Magdaléna Rybáriková	6	1	3

=== Top half ===
==== Section 1 ====
First round
1	(Russia) Anastasia Pavlyuchenkova	1	6^{10}
(Slovakia) Kristína Kučová	6	7^{12}
(Hong Kong) Zhang Ling	4	6^{6}
(Uzbekistan) Dilyara Saidkhodjayeva	6	7^{8}
WC	(United Kingdom) Naomi Cavaday	6	6
(United States) Madison Brengle	4	3
SE	(Russia) Ksenia Lykina	3	7^{7}	8
13	(Czech Republic) Kateřina Vaňková	6	6^{1}	6
12	(Brazil) Teliana Pereira	3	6	5
(Mexico) Valeria Pulido	6	1	7
(United States) Lyndsay Burdette	3	4
Q	(Australia) Tyra Calderwood	6	6
(Russia) Maya Gaverova	0	1
(Poland) Urszula Radwańska	6	6
WC	(United Kingdom) Yasmin Clarke	3	6	3
5	(Romania) Sorana Cîrstea	6	2	6

Second round
(Slovakia) K Kučová	6	6
(Uzbekistan) D Saidkhodjayeva	2	4
WC	(United Kingdom) N Cavaday	6	2	6
SE	(Russia) K Lykina	4	6	1
(Mexico) V Pulido	1	7	2
Q	(Australia) T Calderwood	6	5	6
(Poland) U Radwańska	6	6
5	(Romania) S Cîrstea	4	1

Third round
(Slovakia) K Kučová	3	6^{5}
WC	(United Kingdom) N Cavaday	6	7^{7}
Q	(Australia) T Calderwood	5	3
(Poland) U Radwańska	7	6

Quarterfinals
WC	(United Kingdom) N Cavaday	3	2
(Poland) U Radwańska	6	6

==== Section 2 ====
First round
4	(Denmark) Caroline Wozniacki	5	6	6
WC	(United Kingdom) Georgie Stoop	7	1	2
(New Zealand) Sacha Jones	6	7^{7}
(Brazil) Ana Clara Duarte	3	6^{1}
(Netherlands) Marrit Boonstra	7	6
Q	(United States) Lena Litvak	5	2
Q	(Finland) Katariina Tuohimaa	3	2
15	(Russia) Evgeniya Rodina	6	6
11	(Belarus) Ksenia Milevskaya	6	2	4
(Austria) Nikola Hofmanova	2	6	6
(Georgia (country)) Anna Tatishvili	5	7^{7}	6
(Serbia and Montenegro) Nataša Zorić	7	6^{5}	4
(Philippines) Denise Dy	6	7
WC	(United Kingdom) Victoria Brook	1	5
(Russia) Arina Rodionova	2	0
7	(Japan) Ayumi Morita	6	6

Second round
4	(Denmark) C Wozniacki	6	6
(New Zealand) S Jones	2	1
(Netherlands) M Boonstra	2	2
15	(Russia) E Rodina	6	6
(Austria) N Hofmanova	6	3
(Georgia (country)) A Tatishvili	4	1^{r}
(Philippines) D Dy	2	3
7	(Japan) A Morita	6	6

Third round
4	(Denmark) C Wozniacki	4	6	6
15	(Russia) E Rodina	6	2	3
(Austria) N Hofmanova	0	7	1
7	(Japan) A Morita	6	5	6

Quarterfinals
4	(Denmark) C Wozniacki	7	6
7	(Japan) A Morita	6^{6}	2

=== Bottom half ===
==== Section 3 ====
First round
6	(Slovakia) Magdaléna Rybáriková	6	6
(Kazakhstan) Amina Rakhim	3	4
(Belgium) Yanina Wickmayer	6	1	2
WC	(Russia) Ksenia Pervak	3	6	6
(United States) Chelsey Gullickson	6	7^{7}
(Australia) Jessica Moore	3	6^{1}
Q	(Czech Republic) Andrea Berková	2	2
9	(Ukraine) Khrystyna Antoniichuk	6	6
14	(New Zealand) Marina Erakovic	5	0^{r}
Q	(United Kingdom) Julia Bone	7	2
(Hong Kong) Venise Chan	2	4
(Italy) Corinna Dentoni	6	6
(Brazil) Roxane Vaisemberg	3	3
Q	(Austria) Melanie Klaffner	6	6
(Kyrgyzstan) Ksenia Palkina	1	3
3	(Russia) Alisa Kleybanova	6	6

Second round
6	(Slovakia) M Rybáriková	6	6
WC	(Russia) K Pervak	1	3
(United States) C Gullickson	7	3	1
9	(Ukraine) K Antoniichuk	5	6	6
Q	(United Kingdom) J Bone	6	6
(Italy) C Dentoni	4	2
Q	(Austria) M Klaffner	4	5
3	(Russia) A Kleybanova	6	7

Third round
6	(Slovakia) M Rybáriková	6	6
9	(Ukraine) K Antoniichuk	3	2
Q	(United Kingdom) J Bone	2	1
3	(Russia) A Kleybanova	6	6

Quarterfinals
6	(Slovakia) M Rybáriková	7	4	6
3	(Russia) A Kleybanova	5	6	3

==== Section 4 ====
First round
8	(United States) Julia Cohen	4	6	8
WC	(Germany) Dominice Ripoll	6	3	6
Q	(Czech Republic) Kateřina Kramperová	6	6
(Netherlands) Anouk Tigu	2	3
(Russia) Maria Mosolova	6	6
(Namibia) Suzelle Davin	3	2
WC	(United Kingdom) Jade Curtis	2	3
10	(Austria) Tamira Paszek	6	6
16	(Romania) Alexandra Dulgheru	6	6
(Slovakia) Michaela Pochabová	1	0
(Russia) Alexandra Panova	6	7^{7}
(United States) Kimberly Couts	4	6^{5}
WC	(United Kingdom) Deborah Armstrong	6^{3}	2
Q	(Russia) Anastasia Pivovarova	7^{7}	6
(India) Sanaa Bhambri	1	2
2	(Chinese Taipei) Chan Yung-jan	6	6

Second round
8	(United States) J Cohen	6	2	1
Q	(Czech Republic) K Kramperová	2	6	6
(Russia) M Mosolova	0	1
10	(Austria) T Paszek	6	6
16	(Romania) A Dulgheru	7	6
(Russia) A Panova	5	0
Q	(Russia) A Pivovarova	3	2
(Chinese Taipei) Y-j Chan	6	6

Third round
Q	(Czech Republic) K Kramperová	4	2
10	(Austria) T Paszek	6	6
16	(Romania) A Dulgheru	6	6
2	(Chinese Taipei) Y-j Chan	2	4

Quarterfinals
10	(Austria) T Paszek	6	6
16	(Romania) A Dulgheru	4	4
