= 2006 Wimbledon Championships – Girls' doubles =

Girls' doubles
- 2006 Wimbledon Championships

Final
- Champions: (Russia) Alisa Kleybanova (Russia) Anastasia Pavlyuchenkova
- Runners-up: (Ukraine) Kristina Antoniychuk (Romania) Alexandra Dulgheru
- Score: 6–1, 6–2

Events
Singles	men	women		boys	girls
Doubles	men	women	mixed	boys	girls
WC Singles	men	women	quad
WC Doubles	men	women	quad
Legends	men	women	seniors
← 2005 ·	Wimbledon Championships	· 2007 →

Victoria Azarenka and Ágnes Szávay were the defending champions, but they did not compete in the Juniors this year.

Alisa Kleybanova and Anastasia Pavlyuchenkova defeated Kristina Antoniychuk and Alexandra Dulgheru in the final, 6–1, 6–2 to win the girls' doubles tennis title at the 2006 Wimbledon Championships.

== Seeds ==
1. (Ukraine) Kristina Antoniychuk / (Romania) Alexandra Dulgheru (final)
2. (Russia) Alisa Kleybanova / (Russia) Anastasia Pavlyuchenkova (champions)
3. (Netherlands) Marrit Boonstra / (Denmark) Caroline Wozniacki (quarterfinals)
4. (Romania) Sorana Cîrstea / (Russia) Alexandra Panova (semifinals)
5. (Belarus) Ksenia Milevskaya / (Kazakhstan) Amina Rakhim (quarterfinals)
6. (Slovakia) Kristína Kučová / (Slovakia) Michaela Pochabová (first round)
7. (New Zealand) Sacha Jones / (Belgium) Yanina Wickmayer (first round)
8. (United States) Julia Cohen / (United States) Kimberly Couts (quarterfinals)

== Draw ==
=== Key ===
- Q = Qualifier
- WC = Wild card
- LL = Lucky loser
- Alt = Alternate
- SE = Special exempt
- PR = Protected ranking
- ITF = ITF entry
- JE = Junior exempt
- w/o = Walkover
- r = Retired
- d = Defaulted
- SR = Special ranking

=== Finals ===
Semifinals
1	(Ukraine) Kristina Antoniychuk (Romania) Alexandra Dulgheru	6	6
4	(Romania) Sorana Cîrstea (Russia) Alexandra Panova	2	4
(Poland) Urszula Radwańska (Russia) Arina Rodionova	6^{4}	6^{1}
2	(Russia) Alisa Kleybanova (Russia) Anastasia Pavlyuchenkova	7^{7}	7^{7}

Final
1	(Ukraine) Kristina Antoniychuk (Romania) Alexandra Dulgheru	1	2
2	(Russia) Alisa Kleybanova (Russia) Anastasia Pavlyuchenkova	6	6

=== Top half ===
First round
1	(Ukraine) Kristina Antoniychuk (Romania) Alexandra Dulgheru	6	6
WC	(United Kingdom) Hannah James (United Kingdom) Jocelyn Rae	3	2
(India) Sanaa Bhambri (Hong Kong) Venise Chan	6	6
WC	(United Kingdom) Amanda Cunningham (United Kingdom) Jessica Jackson	2	0
(Russia) Maria Mosolova (Russia) Anastasia Pivovarova	w/o
(Russia) Evgeniya Rodina (Czech Republic) Kateřina Vaňková
(United States) Lyndsay Burdette (Brazil) Roxane Vaisemberg	6	6
6	(Slovakia) Kristína Kučová (Slovakia) Michaela Pochabová	4	2
4	(Romania) Sorana Cîrstea (Russia) Alexandra Panova	4	6	7
(United Kingdom) Naomi Cavaday (Serbia and Montenegro) Nataša Zorić	6	1	5
WC	(United Kingdom) Jade Curtis (United Kingdom) Georgie Stoop	6	6
(Russia) Ksenia Lykina (Netherlands) Anouk Tigu	3	2
(Austria) Nikola Hofmanova (Austria) Melanie Klaffner	4	4
(Australia) Tyra Calderwood (Czech Republic) Kateřina Kramperová	6	6
(Philippines) Denise Dy (Hong Kong) Zhang Ling	6	2	5
5	(Belarus) Ksenia Milevskaya (Kazakhstan) Amina Rakhim	3	6	7

Second round
1	(Ukraine) K Antoniychuk (Romania) A Dulgheru	6	6
(India) S Bhambri (Hong Kong) V Chan	3	4
(Russia) M Mosolova (Russia) A Pivovarova	3	3
(United States) L Burdette (Brazil) R Vaisemberg	6	6
4	(Romania) S Cîrstea (Russia) A Panova	6	6
WC	(United Kingdom) J Curtis (United Kingdom) G Stoop	4	3
(Australia) T Calderwood (Czech Republic) K Kramperová	3	4
5	(Belarus) K Milevskaya (Kazakhstan) A Rakhim	6	6

Quarterfinals
1	(Ukraine) K Antoniychuk (Romania) A Dulgheru	7^{8}	6
(United States) L Burdette (Brazil) R Vaisemberg	6^{6}	2
4	(Romania) S Cîrstea (Russia) A Panova	6	6
5	(Belarus) K Milevskaya (Kazakhstan) A Rakhim	4	4

Semifinals
1	(Ukraine) K Antoniychuk (Romania) A Dulgheru	6	6
4	(Romania) S Cîrstea (Russia) A Panova	2	4

=== Bottom half ===
First round
7	(New Zealand) Sacha Jones (Belgium) Yanina Wickmayer	3	0
(Poland) Urszula Radwańska (Russia) Arina Rodionova	6	6
(Kyrgyzstan) Ksenia Palkina (Germany) Dominice Ripoll	6	6
(Namibia) Suzelle Davin (United States) Kristen McVitty	2	2
(Brazil) Ana Clara Duarte (Brazil) Teliana Pereira	6	3	6
WC	(United Kingdom) Julia Bone (United Kingdom) Laura Peterzan	4	6	1
(United States) Lena Litvak (Finland) Katariina Tuohimaa	0	3
3	(Netherlands) Marrit Boonstra (Denmark) Caroline Wozniacki	6	6
8	(United States) Julia Cohen (United States) Kimberly Couts	6	6
Alt	(United Kingdom) Deborah Armstrong (United Kingdom) Victoria Brook	1	4
(Austria) Tamira Paszek (Georgia (country)) Anna Tatishvili
(Czech Republic) Andrea Berková (Russia) Ksenia Pervak	w/o
(Australia) Jessica Moore (Mexico) Valeria Pulido	6	6
(United Kingdom) Yasmin Clarke (Italy) Corinna Dentoni	0	3
(Russia) Maya Gaverova (Uzbekistan) Dilyara Saidkhodjayeva	4	2
2	(Russia) Alisa Kleybanova (Russia) Anastasia Pavlyuchenkova	6	6

Second round
(Poland) U Radwańska (Russia) A Rodionova	7^{7}	6
(Kyrgyzstan) K Palkina (Germany) D Ripoll	6^{5}	2
(Brazil) AC Duarte (Brazil) T Pereira	6	1	5
3	(Netherlands) M Boonstra (Denmark) C Wozniacki	4	6	7
8	(United States) J Cohen (United States) K Couts	6	6
(Czech Republic) A Berková (Russia) K Pervak	2	3
(Australia) J Moore (Mexico) V Pulido	4	3
2	(Russia) A Kleybanova (Russia) A Pavlyuchenkova	6	6

Quarterfinals
(Poland) U Radwańska (Russia) A Rodionova	3	7	8
3	(Netherlands) M Boonstra (Denmark) C Wozniacki	6	5	6
8	(United States) J Cohen (United States) K Couts	1	3
2	(Russia) A Kleybanova (Russia) A Pavlyuchenkova	6	6

Semifinals
(Poland) U Radwańska (Russia) A Rodionova	6^{4}	6^{1}
2	(Russia) A Kleybanova (Russia) A Pavlyuchenkova	7^{7}	7^{7}
