= Valery Rudnev =

Russian tennis player

Valery Rudnev Валерий Руднев
- Full name: Valery Yuryevich Rudnev
- Country (sports): Russia
- Residence: Moscow, Russia
- Born: 16 February 1988 (age 37) Saint Petersburg, Russia
- Plays: Right-handed (two handed-backhand)
- Prize money: $126,955

Singles
- Career record: 0-0
- Career titles: 0
- Highest ranking: No. 210 (21 July 2014)

Grand Slam singles results
- Australian Open: Q2 (2014)
- US Open: Q1 (2014)

Doubles
- Career record: 0–3 (at ATP Tour level, Grand Slam level, and in Davis Cup)
- Career titles: 0
- Highest ranking: No. 490 (22 March 2010)

Valery Yuryevich Rudnev (Валерий Юрьевич Руднев; born 16 February 1988) is a Russian former tennis player.

== Tennis career ==
Rudnev has a career high ATP singles ranking of 210 achieved on 21 July 2014. He also has a career high ATP doubles ranking of 490 achieved on 22 March 2010. Rudnev has won a total of 7 ITF singles titles on the futures circuit as well as 1 ITF doubles title.

As a junior, Rudnev reached the boys' doubles final of the 2006 French Open with his partner Artur Chernov, where they lost to Emiliano Massa and Kei Nishikori 6–2, 1–6, 2–6.

Rudnev made his ATP main draw debut at the 2009 St. Petersburg Open where he received entry to the main draw as a wildcard entrant into the doubles event partnering Pavel Chekhov. The pair lost an all Russian first round encounter, losing to Igor Andreev and Mikhail Youzhny, 7–6^{(7–4)}, 4–6, [5–10].

== ATP Challenger and ITF Futures finals ==
=== Singles: 14 (7–7) ===
Legend (singles) ATP Challenger Tour (0–1) ITF Futures Tour (7–6)	Finals by surface Hard (3–1) Clay (4–6) Grass (0–0) Carpet (0–0)

Result	W–L	Date	Tournament	Tier	Surface	Opponent	Score
Loss	0–1	Aug 2005	Russia F1, Sergiyev Posad	Futures	Clay	(Kazakhstan) Alexey Kedryuk	1–6, 4–6
Win	1–1	Aug 2007	Italy F26, Avezzano	Futures	Clay	(Italy) Luca Vanni	6–2, 2–6, 7–6^{(7–5)}
Win	2–1	Sep 2008	Russia F6, Moscow	Futures	Clay	(Russia) Evgeny Kirillov	6–4, 6–1
Win	3–1	Nov 2008	Iran F6, Kish Island	Futures	Clay	(Croatia) Antonio Veić	7–6^{(6–2)}, 4–6, 7–5
Loss	3–2	Mar 2009	Turkey F2, Antalya	Futures	Clay	(Ukraine) Ivan Sergeyev	3–6, 1–6
Loss	3–3	Jun 2009	France F9, Toulon	Futures	Clay	(France) David Guez	4–6, 6–7^{(4–7)}
Loss	3–4	Aug 2009	Russia F3, Moscow	Futures	Clay	(France) Guillaume Rufin	2–6, 4–6
Loss	3–5	Jun 2010	France F8, Blois	Futures	Clay	(France) Jonathan Eysseric	4–6, 6–4, 6–7^{(1–7)}
Win	4–5	Jan 2011	Israel F1, Eilat	Futures	Hard	(Finland) Henri Laaksonen	6–1, 6–1
Win	5–5	Mar 2011	Russia F2, Tyumen	Futures	Hard	(Russia) Mikhail Ledovskikh	5–6, 6–2, 6–4
Win	6–5	Dec 2012	Turkey F50, Istanbul	Futures	Hard	(Italy) Lorenzo Frigerio	6–4, 6–3
Win	7–5	Aug 2013	Russia F9, Balashiha	Futures	Clay	(Russia) Victor Baluda	6–3, 6–3
Loss	7–6	Aug 2013	Kazan, Russia	Challenger	Hard	(Ukraine) Sergiy Stakhovsky	2–6, 3–6
Loss	7–7	Sep 2013	Russia F13, Taganrog	Futures	Clay	(Russia) Mikhail Biryukov	6–7^{(4–7)}, 6–7^{(4–7)}

=== Doubles: 6 (1–5) ===
Legend (singles) ATP Challenger Tour (0–2) ITF Futures Tour (1–3)	Titles by surface Hard (0–0) Clay (1–4) Grass (0–0) Carpet (0–1)

Result	W–L	Date	Tournament	Tier	Surface	Partner	Opponents	Score
Win	1–0	Nov 2007	Iran F3, Kish Island	Futures	Clay	(Kazakhstan) Alexey Kedryuk	(Hungary) Attila Balázs (Hungary) György Balázs	7–6^{(7–3)}, 7–5
Loss	1–1	Sep 2008	Russia F8, Sochi	Futures	Clay	(Russia) Sergei Demekhine	(Russia) Mikhail Fufygin (Russia) Vitali Reshetnikov	2–6, 1–6
Loss	1–2	Apr 2009	Russia F1, Moscow	Futures	Carpet	(Russia) Pavel Chekhov	(Russia) Konstantin Kravchuk (Slovakia) Lukáš Lacko	2–6, 4–6
Loss	1–3	May 2009	Poland F1, Katowice	Futures	Clay	(Russia) Denis Matsukevich	(Poland) Jerzy Janowicz (Poland) Mateusz Kowalczyk	3–6, 3–6
Loss	1–4	Aug 2009	Samarkand, Uzbekistan	Challenger	Clay	(Ukraine) Ivan Sergeyev	(Australia) Kaden Hensel (Australia) Adam Hubble	5–7, 5–7
Loss	1–5	Sep 2014	Brașov, Romania	Challenger	Clay	(Russia) Aslan Karatsev	(Italy) Daniele Giorgini (Romania) Adrian Ungur	6–4, 6–7^{(4–7)}, [1–10]

== Junior Grand Slam finals ==
=== Doubles: 1 (1 runner-up) ===
Result	Year	Tournament	Surface	Partner	Opponent	Score
Loss	2006	French Open	Clay	(Russia) Artur Chernov	(Argentina) Emiliano Massa (Japan) Kei Nishikori	6–2, 1–6, 2–6

== Personal life ==
In June 2023, Rudnev married singer Tatiana Bulanova.
