= 2006 Wimbledon Championships – Women's doubles =

Women's doubles
- 2006 Wimbledon Championships

Final
- Champions: (China) Yan Zi (China) Zheng Jie
- Runners-up: (Spain) Virginia Ruano Pascual (Argentina) Paola Suárez
- Score: 6–3, 3–6, 6–2

Details
- Draw: 64 (4 Q / 5 WC )
- Seeds: 16

Events
| Singles | men | women | | boys | girls |
| Doubles | men | women | mixed | boys | girls |
| WC Singles | men | women | quad |
| WC Doubles | men | women | quad |
| Legends | men | women | seniors |
| ← 2005 · | Wimbledon Championships | · 2007 → |

Cara Black and Liezel Huber were the defending champions, but did not play together. Black partnered with Rennae Stubbs and Huber partnered with Martina Navratilova but both pairs lost to Yan Zi and Zheng Jie, in the semifinals and quarterfinals respectively.

Yan and Zheng defeated Virginia Ruano Pascual and Paola Suárez in the final, 6–3, 3–6, 6–2 to win the ladies' doubles tennis title at the 2006 Wimbledon Championships. With their loss in the final, Ruano Pascual and Suárez missed the chance of completing the career Grand Slam.

== Seeds ==
1. (United States) Lisa Raymond / (Australia) Samantha Stosur (third round)
2. (Zimbabwe) Cara Black / (Australia) Rennae Stubbs (semifinals)
3. (Slovakia) Daniela Hantuchová / (Japan) Ai Sugiyama (first round)
4. (China) Yan Zi / (China) Zheng Jie (champions)
5. (Germany) Anna-Lena Grönefeld / (United States) Meghann Shaughnessy (quarterfinals)
6. (Japan) Shinobu Asagoe / (Slovenia) Katarina Srebotnik (first round)
7. (South Africa) Liezel Huber / (United States) Martina Navratilova (quarterfinals)
8. (Russia) Elena Dementieva / (Italy) Flavia Pennetta (third round)
9. (Czech Republic) Květa Peschke / (Italy) Francesca Schiavone (quarterfinals)
10. (Greece) Eleni Daniilidou / (Spain) Anabel Medina Garrigues (quarterfinals)
11. (Russia) Elena Likhovtseva / (Russia) Anastasia Myskina (third round)
12. (Russia) Svetlana Kuznetsova / (France) Amélie Mauresmo (second round)
13. (China) Li Ting / (China) Sun Tiantian (first round)
14. (France) Émilie Loit / (Australia) Nicole Pratt (first round)
15. (France) Nathalie Dechy / (Argentina) Gisela Dulko (first round)
16. (France) Marion Bartoli / (Israel) Shahar Pe'er (second round)

Click on the seed number of a player to go to their draw section.

== Draw ==
=== Key ===
- Q = Qualifier
- WC = Wild card
- LL = Lucky loser
- Alt = Alternate
- ITF = ITF entry
- PR = Protected ranking
- SR = Special ranking
- SE = Special exempt
- JE = Junior exempt
- JR = Junior Accelerator Programme entrant
- CO = College Accelerator Programme entrant
- NG = Next Gen Accelerator Program entrant
- w/o = Walkover
- r = Retired
- d = Defaulted

=== Finals ===
Quarterfinals
(Spain) Virginia Ruano Pascual (Argentina) Paola Suárez | 6^{4} | 6 | 9
10 | (Greece) Eleni Daniilidou (Spain) Anabel Medina Garrigues | 7^{7} | 3 | 7
Q | (Ukraine) Yuliana Fedak (Ukraine) Tatiana Perebiynis | 6^{3} | 6 | 6
5 | (Germany) Anna-Lena Grönefeld (United States) Meghann Shaughnessy | 7^{7} | 4 | 4
7 | (South Africa) Liezel Huber (United States) Martina Navratilova | 6 | 4 | 0
4 | (China) Yan Zi (China) Zheng Jie | 4 | 6 | 6
9 | (Czech Republic) Květa Peschke (Italy) Francesca Schiavone | 6 | 6^{5} | 2
2 | (Zimbabwe) Cara Black (Australia) Rennae Stubbs | 1 | 7^{7} | 6

Semifinals
(Spain) Virginia Ruano Pascual (Argentina) Paola Suárez | 6 | 6
Q | (Ukraine) Yuliana Fedak (Ukraine) Tatiana Perebiynis | 4 | 3
4 | (China) Yan Zi (China) Zheng Jie | 6 | 7
2 | (Zimbabwe) Cara Black (Australia) Rennae Stubbs | 2 | 6^{3}

Final
(Spain) Virginia Ruano Pascual (Argentina) Paola Suárez | 3 | 6 | 2
4 | (China) Yan Zi (China) Zheng Jie | 6 | 3 | 6

=== Top half ===
==== Section 1 ====
First round
1 | (United States) L Raymond (Australia) S Stosur | 7 | 6
(United States) A Frazier (United States) A Spears | 5 | 2
(Poland) M Domachowska (Slovakia) M Suchá | 4 | 4
(Canada) M Drake (Czech Republic) N Vaidišová | 6 | 6
(France) V Razzano (Israel) A Smashnova | 2 | 1
(Spain) V Ruano Pascual (Argentina) P Suárez | 6 | 6
(Sweden) S Arvidsson (Germany) M Müller | 1 | 1
16 | (France) M Bartoli (Israel) S Pe'er | 6 | 6
10 | (Greece) E Daniilidou (Spain) A Medina Garrigues | 6 | 6
LL | (Chinese Taipei) C-w Chan (Chinese Taipei) S-w Hsieh | 4 | 2
(Russia) A Rodionova (Romania) A Vanc | 6 | 6
(Russia) A Chakvetadze (Russia) E Vesnina | 3 | 4
WC | (United Kingdom) S Borwell (United Kingdom) J O'Donoghue | 6^{4} | 5
(Bosnia and Herzegovina) M Jugić-Salkić (Finland) E Laine | 7^{7} | 7
(Switzerland) E Gagliardi (Italy) M Santangelo | 7^{7} | 6
6 | (Japan) S Asagoe (Slovenia) K Srebotnik | 6^{2} | 2

Second round
1 | (United States) L Raymond (Australia) S Stosur | 6 | 6
(Canada) M Drake (Czech Republic) N Vaidišová | 4 | 2
(Spain) V Ruano Pascual (Argentina) P Suárez | 6 | 6
16 | (France) M Bartoli (Israel) S Pe'er | 4 | 1
10 | (Greece) E Daniilidou (Spain) A Medina Garrigues | 6 | 5 | 6
(Russia) A Rodionova (Romania) A Vanc | 2 | 7 | 4
(Bosnia and Herzegovina) M Jugić-Salkić (Finland) E Laine | 6 | 6^{4} | 6
(Switzerland) E Gagliardi (Italy) M Santangelo | 2 | 7^{7} | 4

Third round
1 | (United States) L Raymond (Australia) S Stosur | 4 | 4
(Spain) V Ruano Pascual (Argentina) P Suárez | 6 | 6
10 | (Greece) E Daniilidou (Spain) A Medina Garrigues | 6 | 7^{7}
(Bosnia and Herzegovina) M Jugić-Salkić (Finland) E Laine | 4 | 6^{3}

Quarterfinals
(Spain) V Ruano Pascual (Argentina) P Suárez | 6^{4} | 6 | 9
10 | (Greece) E Daniilidou (Spain) A Medina Garrigues | 7^{7} | 3 | 7

==== Section 2 ====
First round
3 | (Slovakia) D Hantuchová (Japan) A Sugiyama | 3 | 4
(Slovakia) J Gajdošová (United States) A Harkleroad | 6 | 6
(Czech Republic) I Benešová (Czech Republic) B Strýcová | 2 | 6 | 6
(Czech Republic) G Navrátilová (Czech Republic) M Paštiková | 6 | 1 | 3
WC | (United Kingdom) K O'Brien (United Kingdom) M South | 4 | 4
Q | (Ukraine) Y Fedak (Ukraine) T Perebiynis | 6 | 6
(Estonia) M Ani (United States) M Tu | 6 | 1 | 6
15 | (France) N Dechy (Argentina) G Dulko | 4 | 6 | 3
12 | (Russia) S Kuznetsova (France) A Mauresmo | 4 | 6 | 6
(Argentina) ME Salerni (Venezuela) M Vento-Kabchi | 6 | 2 | 0
WC | (United Kingdom) C Curran (United States) J Jackson | 6^{5} | 2
Q | (Czech Republic) L Hradecká (Czech Republic) H Šromová | 7^{7} | 6
(Belarus) T Poutchek (Belarus) A Yakimova | 2 | 3
LL | (Argentina) M Díaz Oliva (South Africa) N Grandin | 6 | 6
(Latvia) L Dekmeijere (Estonia) K Kanepi | 2 | 2
5 | (Germany) A-L Grönefeld (United States) M Shaughnessy | 6 | 6

Second round
(Slovakia) J Gajdošová (United States) A Harkleroad | 7 | 6
(Czech Republic) I Benešová (Czech Republic) B Strýcová | 5 | 4
Q | (Ukraine) Y Fedak (Ukraine) T Perebiynis | 4 | 6 | 6
(Estonia) M Ani (United States) M Tu | 6 | 4 | 2
12 | (Russia) S Kuznetsova (France) A Mauresmo
Q | (Czech Republic) L Hradecká (Czech Republic) H Šromová | w/o
LL | (Argentina) M Díaz Oliva (South Africa) N Grandin | 2 | 6^{5}
5 | (Germany) A-L Grönefeld (United States) M Shaughnessy | 6 | 7^{7}

Third round
(Slovakia) J Gajdošová (United States) A Harkleroad | 1 | 1
Q | (Ukraine) Y Fedak (Ukraine) T Perebiynis | 6 | 6
Q | (Czech Republic) L Hradecká (Czech Republic) H Šromová | 4 | 5
5 | (Germany) A-L Grönefeld (United States) M Shaughnessy | 6 | 7

Quarterfinals
Q | (Ukraine) Y Fedak (Ukraine) T Perebiynis | 6^{3} | 6 | 6
5 | (Germany) A-L Grönefeld (United States) M Shaughnessy | 7^{7} | 4 | 4

=== Bottom half ===
==== Section 3 ====
First round
7 | (South Africa) L Huber (United States) M Navratilova | 6 | 6
(Ukraine) A Bondarenko (Ukraine) K Bondarenko | 3 | 1
(Serbia) J Janković (Slovenia) T Križan | 6 | 6
(Serbia) A Ivanovic (Russia) M Kirilenko | 3 | 4
WC | (United Kingdom) A Keen (United Kingdom) A Keothavong | 4 | 7^{9} | 3
(United States) C Gullickson (Australia) B Stewart | 6 | 6^{7} | 6
(Tunisia) S Sfar (Germany) J Wöhr | 3 | 4
11 | (Russia) E Likhovtseva (Russia) A Myskina | 6 | 6
14 | (France) É Loit (Australia) N Pratt | 5 | 7^{7} | 3
(Italy) ME Camerin (Italy) T Garbin | 7 | 6^{3} | 6
(Spain) L Dominguez-Lino (Spain) M Sánchez Lorenzo | 6 | 7^{7}
(United States) L Granville (United States) S Perry | 3 | 6^{1}
(United States) J Craybas (Croatia) J Kostanić | 1 | 2
(Slovakia) J Husárová (Russia) V Zvonareva | 6 | 6
LL | (Hungary) M Czink (United States) V King | 3 | 1
4 | (China) Z Yan (China) J Zheng | 6 | 6

Second round
7 | (South Africa) L Huber (United States) M Navratilova | 6 | 3 | 6
(Serbia) J Janković (Slovenia) T Križan | 4 | 6 | 4
(United States) C Gullickson (Australia) B Stewart | 4 | 3
11 | (Russia) E Likhovtseva (Russia) A Myskina | 6 | 6
(Italy) ME Camerin (Italy) T Garbin | 6 | 6
(Spain) L Domínguez Lino (Spain) M Sánchez Lorenzo | 3 | 3
(Slovakia) J Husárová (Russia) V Zvonareva | 0 | 6^{4}
4 | (China) Z Yan (China) J Zheng | 6 | 7^{7}

Third round
7 | (South Africa) L Huber (United States) M Navratilova | 7 | 6
11 | (Russia) E Likhovtseva (Russia) A Myskina | 5 | 0
(Italy) ME Camerin (Italy) T Garbin | 6 | 2 | 0
4 | (China) Z Yan (China) J Zheng | 4 | 6 | 6

Quarterfinals
7 | (South Africa) L Huber (United States) M Navratilova | 6 | 4 | 0
4 | (China) Z Yan (China) J Zheng | 4 | 6 | 6

==== Section 4 ====
First round
8 | (Russia) E Dementieva (Italy) F Pennetta | 6 | 6
(Austria) S Bammer (Germany) J Schruff | 3 | 3
(Netherlands) M Krajicek (India) S Mirza | 6 | 4 | 6
(France) S Foretz (Italy) A Serra Zanetti | 3 | 6 | 2
(Russia) V Dushevina (Russia) G Voskoboeva | 7^{7} | 6^{4} | 8
(Japan) A Morigami (Japan) A Nakamura | 6^{4} | 7^{7} | 6
(Ukraine) Y Beygelzimer (Czech Republic) E Birnerová | 1 | 5
9 | (Czech Republic) K Peschke (Italy) F Schiavone | 6 | 7
13 | (China) T Li (China) T Sun | 6 | 3 | 2
(United States) B Mattek (United States) M Washington | 4 | 6 | 6
Q | (France) S Cohen-Aloro (Spain) MJ Martínez Sánchez | 6 | 6
Q | (United States) L Osterloh (United States) A Rolle | 1 | 2
(Czech Republic) K Koukalová (Czech Republic) V Uhlířová | 3 | 4
(China) N Li (China) S Peng | 6 | 6
WC | (United Kingdom) R Llewellyn (United Kingdom) K Paterson | 1 | 3
2 | (Zimbabwe) C Black (Australia) R Stubbs | 6 | 6

Second round
8 | (Russia) E Dementieva (Italy) F Pennetta | 6 | 6
(Netherlands) M Krajicek (India) S Mirza | 4 | 2
(Russia) V Dushevina (Russia) G Voskoboeva | 6 | 6^{3} | 1
9 | (Czech Republic) K Peschke (Italy) F Schiavone | 3 | 7^{7} | 6
(United States) B Mattek (United States) M Washington | 3 | 5
Q | (France) S Cohen-Aloro (Spain) MJ Martínez Sánchez | 6 | 7
(China) N Li (China) S Peng
2 | (Zimbabwe) C Black (Australia) R Stubbs | w/o

Third round
8 | (Russia) E Dementieva (Italy) F Pennetta | 5 | 2
9 | (Czech Republic) K Peschke (Italy) F Schiavone | 7 | 6
Q | (France) S Cohen-Aloro (Spain) MJ Martínez Sánchez | 3 | 4
2 | (Zimbabwe) C Black (Australia) R Stubbs | 6 | 6

Quarterfinals
9 | (Czech Republic) K Peschke (Italy) F Schiavone | 6 | 6^{5} | 2
2 | (Zimbabwe) C Black (Australia) R Stubbs | 1 | 7^{7} | 6
