= 2006 Wimbledon Championships – Wheelchair men's doubles =

Wheelchair men's doubles
- 2006 Wimbledon Championships

Final
- Champions: (Japan) Shingo Kunieda (Japan) Satoshi Saida
- Runners-up: (France) Michaël Jeremiasz (United Kingdom) Jayant Mistry
- Score: 7–5, 6–2

Events
| Singles | men | women | | boys | girls |
| Doubles | men | women | mixed | boys | girls |
| WC Singles | men | women | quad |
| WC Doubles | men | women | quad |
| Legends | men | women | seniors |
| ← 2005 · | Wimbledon Championships | · 2007 → |

Shingo Kunieda and Satoshi Saida defeated the defending champions Michaël Jeremiasz and Jayant Mistry in the final, 7–5, 6–2 to win the gentlemen's doubles wheelchair tennis title at the 2006 Wimbledon Championships.

== Seeds ==
1. (Japan) Shingo Kunieda / (Japan) Satoshi Saida (champions)
2. (Netherlands) Robin Ammerlaan / (Austria) Martin Legner (semifinals, third place)

== Draw ==
=== Key ===
- Q = Qualifier
- WC = Wild card
- LL = Lucky loser
- Alt = Alternate
- ITF = ITF entry
- PR = Protected ranking
- SR = Special ranking
- SE = Special exempt
- JE = Junior exempt
- JR = Junior Accelerator Programme entrant
- CO = College Accelerator Programme entrant
- NG = Next Gen Accelerator Program entrant
- w/o = Walkover
- r = Retired
- d = Defaulted

=== Finals ===
Semifinals
1 | (Japan) Shingo Kunieda (Japan) Satoshi Saida | 1 | 6 | 6
(Czech Republic) Miroslav Brychta (Poland) Tadeusz Kruszelnicki | 6 | 2 | 2
(France) Michaël Jeremiasz (United Kingdom) Jayant Mistry | 6 | 6
2 | (Netherlands) Robin Ammerlaan (Austria) Martin Legner | 1 | 3

Final
1 | (Japan) Shingo Kunieda (Japan) Satoshi Saida | 7 | 6
(France) Michaël Jeremiasz (United Kingdom) Jayant Mistry | 5 | 2
3rd place playoff
(Czech Republic) Miroslav Brychta (Poland) Tadeusz Kruszelnicki | 3 | 1
2 | (Netherlands) Robin Ammerlaan (Austria) Martin Legner | 6 | 6
