= Khrystyna Antoniichuk =

Ukrainian tennis player (born 1990)

Khrystyna Antoniichuk Khrystyna Antoniychuk
- Native name: Христина Антонійчук
- Country (sports): Ukraine
- Residence: Dnipropetrovsk, Ukraine
- Born: 4 September 1990 (age 35) Kolomyia, Ukraine
- Height: 1.70 m (5 ft 7 in)
- Prize money: $61,656

Singles
- Career record: 94–54
- Career titles: 4 ITF
- Highest ranking: No. 163 (8 March 2010)

Grand Slam singles results
- Australian Open: Q2 (2010)

Doubles
- Career record: 37–32
- Career titles: 3 ITF
- Highest ranking: No. 275 (12 April 2010)

Khrystyna Antoniichuk or Antoniychuk (Ukrainian: Христина Антонійчук; born 4 September 1990) is a former professional tennis player from Ukraine. Her highest WTA singles ranking is 163, which she reached on 8 March 2010. Her career-high in doubles is 275, which she achieved on 12 April 2010.

On 12 May 2010, it was announced by the International Tennis Federation that Antoniichuk had committed a doping offence, and was suspended from participation in WTA and ITF events until 21 April 2011, after her sample was found to contain the diuretic furosemide.

Antoniichuk's last appearance on the ITF Circuit was in April 2010.

== ITF Circuit finals ==
Legend
$50,000 tournaments
$25,000 tournaments
$10,000 tournaments

=== Singles: 6 (4 titles, 2 runner-ups) ===
Result	No.	Date	Tournament	Surface	Opponent	Score
Win	1.	16 July 2006	ITF Dnipropetrovsk, Ukraine	Clay	(Slovenia) Andreja Klepač	6–3, 6–7^{(5)}, 6–4
Loss	2.	14 August 2007	ITF Penza, Russia	Clay	(Russia) Anna Lapushchenkova	6–4, 6–2
Win	3.	21 July 2008	ITF Kharkiv, Ukraine	Clay	(Ukraine) Irina Buryachok	6–3, 4–6, 6–1
Win	4.	27 April 2009	ITF Namangan, Uzbekistan	Hard	(Ukraine) Tetyana Arefyeva	6–0, 6–1
Win	5.	18 May 2009	ITF Kharkiv, Ukraine	Clay	(Georgia (country)) Oksana Kalashnikova	4–6, 6–4, 6–1
Loss	6.	8 June 2009	ITF Qarshi, Uzbekistan	Hard	(Greece) Irini Georgatou	6–1, 3–1 ret.

=== Doubles: 7 (3 titles, 4 runner-ups) ===
Result	No.	Date	Tournament	Surface	Partner	Opponents	Score
Win	1.	3 July 2005	ITF Heerhugowaard, Netherlands	Clay	(Montenegro) Ana Veselinović	(Netherlands) Marrit Boonstra (Netherlands) Nicole Thyssen	1–6, 6–2, 7–5
Loss	2.	22 July 2006	ITF Dnipropetrovsk, Ukraine	Clay	(Russia) Evgeniya Rodina	(Ukraine) Olena Antypina (Russia) Nina Bratchikova	6–1, 5–7, 7–5
Loss	3.	13 August 2006	Ladies Open Hechingen, Germany	Clay	(Romania) Raluca Olaru	(Slovenia) Eva Fislová (Slovenia) Stanislava Hrozenská	6–3, 6–7^{(3)}, 6–3
Loss	4.	25 July 2008	ITF Kharkiv, Ukraine	Clay	(Ukraine) Lesia Tsurenko	(Romania) Mihaela Buzărnescu (Georgia (country)) Oksana Kalashnikova	6–1, 6–4
Win	5.	12 June 2009	ITF Qarshi, Uzbekistan	Hard	(Georgia (country)) Oksana Kalashnikova	(Turkey) Pemra Özgen (Turkey) Çağla Büyükakçay	5–7, 6–0, [10–6]
Loss	6.	24 July 2009	ITF Kharkiv, Ukraine	Clay	(Ukraine) Irina Buryachok	(Australia) Monique Adamczak (Australia) Nicole Kriz	6–3, 7–6^{(4)}
Win	7.	22 March 2010	ITF Namangan, Uzbekistan	Hard	(Russia) Ksenia Lykina	(Poland) Karolina Kosińska (Slovakia) Lenka Wienerová	6–3, 5–7, [10–8]
