= 2006 Wimbledon Championships – Mixed doubles =

Mixed doubles
- 2006 Wimbledon Championships

Final
- Champions: (Israel) Andy Ram (Russia) Vera Zvonareva
- Runners-up: (United States) Bob Bryan (United States) Venus Williams
- Score: 6–3, 6–2

Details
- Draw: 48 (5 WC )
- Seeds: 16

Events
Singles	men	women		boys	girls
Doubles	men	women	mixed	boys	girls
WC Singles	men	women	quad
WC Doubles	men	women	quad
Legends	men	women	seniors
← 2005 ·	Wimbledon Championships	· 2007 →

Andy Ram and Vera Zvonareva defeated Bob Bryan and Venus Williams in the final, 6–3, 6–2 to win the mixed doubles tennis title at the 2006 Wimbledon Championships.

Mahesh Bhupathi and Mary Pierce were the defending champions, but Pierce did not compete. Bhupathi partnered with Yan Zi, but lost in the second round to Bryan and Williams.

== Seeds ==
All seeds received a bye into the second round.

1. (Sweden) Jonas Björkman / (United States) Lisa Raymond (third round, withdrew)
2. (Belarus) Max Mirnyi / (China) Zheng Jie (semifinals)
3. (Zimbabwe) Wayne Black / (Zimbabwe) Cara Black (semifinals)
4. (India) Leander Paes / (Australia) Samantha Stosur (quarterfinals)
5. (Canada) Daniel Nestor / (Russia) Elena Likhovtseva (quarterfinals)
6. (Australia) Todd Perry / (Australia) Rennae Stubbs (third round)
7. (Serbia) Nenad Zimonjić / (Slovenia) Katarina Srebotnik (quarterfinals)
8. (The Bahamas) Mark Knowles / (United States) Martina Navratilova (third round)
9. (Israel) Andy Ram / (Russia) Vera Zvonareva (champions)
10. (Czech Republic) Martin Damm / (Czech Republic) Květa Peschke (third round)
11. (India) Mahesh Bhupathi / (China) Yan Zi (second round)
12. (Czech Republic) Leoš Friedl / (South Africa) Liezel Huber (second round)
13. (United States) Mike Bryan / (United States) Corina Morariu (third round)
14. (Israel) Jonathan Erlich / (Russia) Dinara Safina (second round)
15. (Zimbabwe) Kevin Ullyett / (Israel) Shahar Pe'er (second round)
16. (Czech Republic) František Čermák / (Germany) Anna-Lena Grönefeld (quarterfinals)

Click on the seed number of a player to go to their draw section.

== Draw ==
=== Key ===
- Q = Qualifier
- WC = Wild card
- LL = Lucky loser
- Alt = Alternate
- ITF = ITF entry
- PR = Protected ranking
- SR = Special ranking
- SE = Special exempt
- JE = Junior exempt
- JR = Junior Accelerator Programme entrant
- CO = College Accelerator Programme entrant
- NG = Next Gen Accelerator Program entrant
- w/o = Walkover
- r = Retired
- d = Defaulted

=== Finals ===
Quarterfinals
16	(Czech Republic) František Čermák (Germany) Anna-Lena Grönefeld	3	4
9	(Israel) Andy Ram (Russia) Vera Zvonareva	6	6
3	(Zimbabwe) Wayne Black (Zimbabwe) Cara Black	6^{4}	6	11
7	(Serbia) Nenad Zimonjić (Slovenia) Katarina Srebotnik	7^{7}	4	9
(United States) Bob Bryan (United States) Venus Williams	7^{7}	6
4	(India) Leander Paes (Australia) Samantha Stosur	6^{3}	3
5	(Canada) Daniel Nestor (Russia) Elena Likhovtseva	2	3
2	(Belarus) Max Mirnyi (China) Zheng Jie	6	6

Semifinals
9	(Israel) Andy Ram (Russia) Vera Zvonareva	6	7^{7}
3	(Zimbabwe) Wayne Black (Zimbabwe) Cara Black	3	6^{5}
(United States) Bob Bryan (United States) Venus Williams	7	7
2	(Belarus) Max Mirnyi (China) Zheng Jie	5	5

Final
9	(Israel) Andy Ram (Russia) Vera Zvonareva	6	6
(United States) Bob Bryan (United States) Venus Williams	3	2

=== Top half ===
==== Section 1 ====
First round
WC	(United Kingdom) J Auckland (United Kingdom) C Curran	2
(Argentina) L Arnold Ker (Italy) F Schiavone	3^{r}
(Sweden) R Lindstedt (Sweden) S Arvidsson	3	4
WC	(United Kingdom) A Murray (Belgium) K Flipkens	6	6
(Czech Republic) J Levinský (Russia) A Chakvetadze	4	6^{9}
(South Africa) C Haggard (Greece) E Daniilidou	6	7^{11}
(United States) J Gimelstob (United States) M Shaughnessy	6	6
(Poland) M Matkowski (Poland) M Domachowska	4	2

Second round
1	(Sweden) J Björkman (United States) L Raymond	6	6
WC	(United Kingdom) J Auckland (United Kingdom) C Curran	3	2
WC	(United Kingdom) A Murray (Belgium) K Flipkens	4	2
16	(Czech Republic) F Čermák (Germany) A-L Grönefeld	6	6
9	(Israel) A Ram (Russia) V Zvonareva	6	2	6
(South Africa) C Haggard (Greece) E Daniilidou	4	6	4
(United States) J Gimelstob (United States) M Shaughnessy	2	6^{4}
8	(The Bahamas) M Knowles (United States) M Navratilova	6	7^{7}

Third round
1	(Sweden) J Björkman (United States) L Raymond	w/o
16	(Czech Republic) F Čermák (Germany) A-L Grönefeld
9	(Israel) A Ram (Russia) V Zvonareva	7	6
8	(The Bahamas) M Knowles (United States) M Navratilova	5	1

Quarterfinals
16	(Czech Republic) F Čermák (Germany) A-L Grönefeld	3	4
9	(Israel) A Ram (Russia) V Zvonareva	6	6

==== Section 2 ====
First round
WC	(Australia) W Arthurs (Australia) A Molik	6	6^{5}	4
Alt	(Czech Republic) L Dlouhý (Czech Republic) E Birnerová	3	7^{7}	6
(Czech Republic) D Škoch (Romania) A Vanc	6	1	0
(Chile) F González (Argentina) G Dulko	2	6	6
(Poland) M Fyrstenberg (United States) J Craybas	6	6
(United States) J Thomas (Russia) A Rodionova	4	4
(United States) T Parrott (China) S Peng	6^{3}	6^{5}
(Netherlands) R Wassen (Netherlands) M Krajicek	7^{7}	7^{7}

Second round
3	(Zimbabwe) W Black (Zimbabwe) C Black	6	6
Alt	(Czech Republic) L Dlouhý (Czech Republic) E Birnerová	2	1
(Chile) F González (Argentina) G Dulko	w/o
13	(United States) M Bryan (United States) C Morariu
10	(Czech Republic) M Damm (Czech Republic) K Peschke	6	7^{15}
(Poland) M Fyrstenberg (United States) J Craybas	3	6^{13}
(Netherlands) R Wassen (Netherlands) M Krajicek	4	4
7	(Serbia) N Zimonjić (Slovenia) K Srebotnik	6	6

Third round
3	(Zimbabwe) W Black (Zimbabwe) C Black	6	6
13	(United States) M Bryan (United States) C Morariu	2	4
10	(Czech Republic) M Damm (Czech Republic) K Peschke	6^{10}	7^{7}	4
7	(Serbia) N Zimonjić (Slovenia) K Srebotnik	7^{12}	6^{3}	6

Quarterfinals
3	(Zimbabwe) W Black (Zimbabwe) C Black	6^{4}	6	11
7	(Serbia) N Zimonjić (Slovenia) K Srebotnik	7^{7}	4	9

=== Bottom half ===
==== Section 3 ====
First round
(Australia) J Kerr (Australia) B Stewart	4	1
(Sweden) S Aspelin (China) T Sun	6	6
(United States) B Bryan (United States) V Williams	6	6
(South Africa) J Coetzee (Japan) A Sugiyama	3	3
(Argentina) S Prieto (Italy) F Pennetta	6	6
WC	(Czech Republic) C Suk (Czech Republic) H Suková	4	3
(United States) G Oliver (United States) M Tu	2	6^{5}
WC	(Australia) P Hanley (Ukraine) T Perebiynis	6	7^{7}

Second round
6	(Australia) T Perry (Australia) R Stubbs	4	7^{7}	6
(Sweden) S Aspelin (China) T Sun	6	6^{3}	4
(United States) B Bryan (United States) V Williams	6	6
11	(India) M Bhupathi (China) Z Yan	4	1
14	(Israel) J Erlich (Russia) D Safina	6	4	3
(Argentina) S Prieto (Italy) F Pennetta	1	6	6
WC	(Australia) P Hanley (Ukraine) T Perebiynis	6	3	10
4	(India) L Paes (Australia) S Stosur	4	6	12

Third round
6	(Australia) T Perry (Australia) R Stubbs	6^{4}	3
(United States) B Bryan (United States) V Williams	7^{7}	6
(Argentina) S Prieto (Italy) F Pennetta	3	2
4	(India) L Paes (Australia) S Stosur	6	6

Quarterfinals
(United States) B Bryan (United States) V Williams	7^{7}	6
4	(India) L Paes (Australia) S Stosur	6^{3}	3

==== Section 4 ====
First round
(Australia) A Fisher (Australia) N Pratt	6	6
(Slovakia) M Mertiňák (Slovakia) M Suchá	3	2
(Czech Republic) P Vízner (India) S Mirza	6	7
(Spain) F Verdasco (Spain) A Medina Garrigues	2	5
(South Africa) W Moodie (Russia) V Dushevina	6	6
(Czech Republic) P Pála (Colombia) C Castaño	4	4
(Argentina) M García (Italy) M Santangelo	4	3
(Australia) S Huss (United States) B Mattek	6	6

Second round
5	(Canada) D Nestor (Russia) E Likhovtseva	6	6
(Australia) A Fisher (Australia) N Pratt	1	1
(Czech Republic) P Vízner (India) S Mirza	6	6
12	(Czech Republic) L Friedl (South Africa) L Huber	1	1
15	(Zimbabwe) K Ullyett (Israel) S Pe'er	3	4
(South Africa) W Moodie (Russia) V Dushevina	6	6
(Australia) S Huss (United States) B Mattek	2	2
2	(Belarus) M Mirnyi (China) J Zheng	6	6

Third round
5	(Canada) D Nestor (Russia) E Likhovtseva	6	5	6
(Czech Republic) P Vízner (India) S Mirza	3	7	2
(South Africa) W Moodie (Russia) V Dushevina	4	7^{7}	7
2	(Belarus) M Mirnyi (China) J Zheng	6	6^{5}	9

Quarterfinals
5	(Canada) D Nestor (Russia) E Likhovtseva	2	3
2	(Belarus) M Mirnyi (China) J Zheng	6	6
