= Emiliano Massa =

Argentine tennis player

- Full name: Emiliano Massa
- Country (sports): Argentina
- Born: 5 December 1988 (age 37) Formosa, Argentina
- Plays: Right-handed (Two-Handed Backhand)
- Prize money: $6,880

Singles
- Career record: 0–0
- Career titles: 0; 0 Challenger, 0 Futures
- Highest ranking: No. 845 (3 October 2005)

Doubles
- Career record: 0–1
- Career titles: 0; 0 Challenger, 2 Futures
- Highest ranking: No. 763 (6 March 2006)
- Last updated on: 5 August 2021.

Emiliano Massa (born 5 December 1988) is a former professional tennis player from Argentina who won two junior grand slam boys' doubles titles at the French Open.

== Biography ==
Massa, who comes from Formosa, is the younger brother of top 100 player Edgardo Massa.

A right-handed player, Massa had a noted career on the ITF Junior Circuit. He won the Orange Bowl 16 and under singles title in 2004, which he followed up in 2005 with an 18 and under doubles title, partnering Leonardo Mayer. Massa, who was an Argentine Junior Davis Cup representative, won two French Open doubles titles, with Mayer in 2005 and Kei Nishikori in 2006.

He made his only appearance in the main draw of an ATP Tour tournament at the 2006 ATP Buenos Aires, where he and junior partner Mayer were a wildcard pairing in the doubles event. They were beaten in the first round by French players Olivier Patience and Florent Serra, in an encounter decided by a match tiebreak.

His professional career was hampered by shoulder injuries and he left the circuit after 2006, before making a brief comeback in 2010.

== Junior Grand Slam finals ==
=== Doubles: 2 (2 titles) ===
Result	Year	Tournament	Surface	Partner	Opponent	Score
Win	2005	French Open	Clay	(Argentina) Leonardo Mayer	(Ukraine) Sergey Bubka (France) Jérémy Chardy	2–6, 6–3, 6–4
Win	2006	French Open	Clay	(Japan) Kei Nishikori	(Russia) Artur Chernov (Russia) Valery Rudnev	2–6, 6–1, 6–2

== ATP Challenger and ITF Futures finals ==
=== Doubles: 2 (2–0) ===
Legend (singles) ATP Challenger Tour (0–0) ITF Futures Tour (2–0)	Titles by surface Hard (0–0) Clay (2–0) Grass (0–0) Carpet (0–0)

Result	W–L	Date	Tournament	Tier	Surface	Partner	Opponents	Score
Win	1–0	Aug 2005	Argentina F6, Buenos Aires	Futures	Clay	(Argentina) Leonardo Mayer	(Argentina) Diego Cristin (Argentina) Máximo González	6–1, 5–7, 6–4
Win	2–0	Sep 2005	Argentina F12, Buenos Aires	Futures	Clay	(Argentina) Leonardo Mayer	(Argentina) Diego Cristin (Argentina) Lucas Arnold Ker	7–6^{(7–4)}, 6–3
