= Clint Bowles =

American tennis player

- Country (sports): United States
- Born: November 16, 1988 (age 36); Tampa, Florida, U.S.
- Height: 5 ft 8 in (173 cm)
- Plays: Left-handed
- Prize money: $6,034

Singles
- Career record: 0–1
- Highest ranking: No. 1174 (July 5, 2010)

Doubles
- Highest ranking: No. 1260 (May 12, 2008)

Clint Bowles (born November 16, 1988) is an American former professional tennis player.

A left-handed player from Tampa, Bowles won the USTA national clay-court championships for both the 14s and 18s age groups. He was ranked as high as 28th in the world on the ITF junior circuit.

Bowles competed as a wildcard in the main draw of an ATP Tour tournament at Delray Beach in 2008, losing in the first round to Paul Capdeville. His other professional appearances were on the ITF Futures circuit.

From 2008 to 2011 he played collegiate tennis for Florida State University, where he twice received All-ACC honors.
