= Artur Chernov =

Russian tennis player, top 10 tennis player among juniors worldwide

- Native name: Чернов Артур Игоревич
- Country (sports): Russia
- Born: 4 June 1988 (age 36); Moscow, Russia

Singles
- Career record: 0–0 (at ATP Tour level, Grand Slam level, and in Davis Cup)
- Highest ranking: No. 589 (20 July 2009)

Doubles
- Career record: 0–2 (at ATP Tour level, Grand Slam level, and in Davis Cup)
- Highest ranking: No. 869 (6 August 2007)
- Last updated on: 5 August 2021.

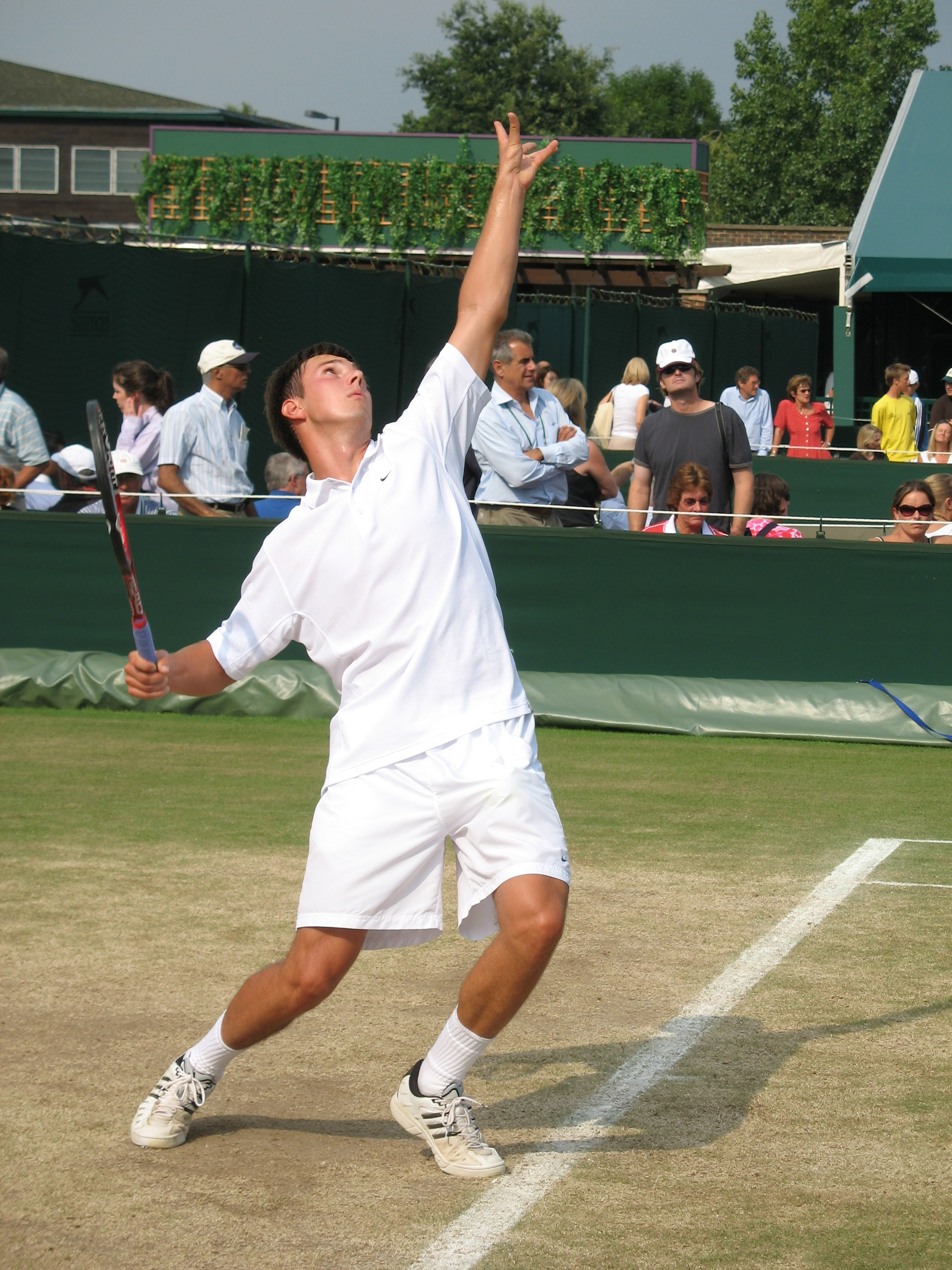
Артур Чернов на Уимблдоне 2006

Artur Chernov (born 4 June 1988) is a former Russian tennis player.

Artur started playing tennis at the age of 4 in Moscow at the stadium in Luzhniki.

At the age of 7, he began to practice at the tennis department of the Russian State University of Physical Culture and Sports under the control of the founders of the Russian tennis school I.V. Vsevolodov and S.P. Belitz-Gaiman.

There were issued tennis books by I.V. Vsevolodov and S.P. Belitz-Gaiman with tennis photos of young Artur playing tennis.

Artur repeatedly became the champion of Moscow and Russia among juniors and adults.

At the age of 14, he completed the title of Master of Sports of Russia.

Chernov is a TOP 10 player among juniors over the world according to ITF singles ranking and achieved it on 30 October 2006.

He won 2 ITF titles in 2006, both tournaments were Grade 1: 18th Czech International Junior Indoor Championships and Bangkok ITF Junior Championship .

The same year he also was runner up in 13th Slovak Junior Indoor Tournament and lost in final to Roberto Bautista Agut 6:7 (4) 6:4 4:6 .

Artur Chernov in the doubles draw partnering Valery Rudnev at the Junior Grand Slam French Open 2006 were runners up and lost in the final to Kei Nishikori and Emiliano Massa 6:2 1:6 2:6.

From the age of 12, he was a member of the Russian national team among juniors, and in 2006 Artur Chernov was invited to the Russian national tennis team for the final Davis Cup match between Russia and Argentina where he practiced with top Russian tennis players Marat Safin, Dmitry Tursunov, Nikolay Davydenko, Igor Andreev and Mikhail Youzhny.

Chernov has a career high ATP singles ranking of 589 achieved on 20 July 2009. He also has a career high ATP doubles ranking of 869 achieved on 6 August 2007.

Chernov made his ATP main draw debut at the 2006 St. Petersburg Open in the doubles draw partnering Valery Rudnev.

Graduated from the Russian State University of Physical Culture and Moscow State Institute of International Relations.

In 2014, Artur Chernov was elected the coach of the Russian national tennis team.

== Junior Grand Slam finals ==
=== Doubles: 1 (1 runner-up) ===
Result	Year	Tournament	Surface	Partner	Opponent	Score
Loss	2006	French Open	Clay	(Russia) Valery Rudnev	(Argentina) Emiliano Massa (Japan) Kei Nishikori	6–2, 1–6, 2–6
