= Daniel Alejandro López =

Paraguayan tennis player

- Full name: Daniel Alejandro López Cassaccia
- Country (sports): Paraguay
- Residence: Asunción, Paraguay
- Born: 3 July 1989 (age 35); Asunción, Paraguay
- Height: 1.83 m (6 ft 0 in)
- Plays: Right Handed (Double Handed Backhand)
- Prize money: $36,506

Singles
- Career record: 4-8 (ATP Tour level, Grand Slam level, and Davis Cup)
- Career titles: 0
- Highest ranking: No. 540 (June 7, 2010)

Doubles
- Career record: 2-1 (ATP Tour level, Grand Slam level, and Davis Cup)
- Career titles: 0
- Highest ranking: No. 322 (August 15, 2011)
- Last updated on: 28 May 2021.

Daniel Alejandro López Cassaccia (Latin American Spanish: [danjel aleˈxandɾo ˈlopes]; born July 3, 1989) is a retired tennis player from Paraguay. He played on the Paraguay Davis Cup team. Alongside Matteo Trevisan he won the 2007 Wimbledon Championships – Boys' doubles title.

== ATP Challenger and ITF Futures finals ==
=== Singles: 4 (0–4) ===
Legend ATP Challenger (0–0) ITF Futures (0–4)	Finals by surface Hard (0–0) Clay (0–4) Grass (0–0) Carpet (0–0)

Result	W–L	Date	Tournament	Tier	Surface	Opponent	Score
Loss	0–1	Jul 2008	Paraguay F2, Lambare	Futures	Clay	(Argentina) Juan-Pablo Amado	6–1, 1–6, 1–6
Loss	0–2	Sep 2008	Bolivia F2, Cochabamba	Futures	Clay	(Argentina) Gonzalo Tur	4–6, 4–6
Loss	0–3	Apr 2010	Brazil F3, Brasília	Futures	Clay	(France) Jonathan Eysseric	6–4, 3–6, 3–6
Loss	0–4	Jul 2011	Chile F5, Iquique	Futures	Clay	(Argentina) Gaston-Arturo Grimolizzi	4–6, 2–6

=== Doubles: 14 (6–8) ===
Legend ATP Challenger (0–0) ITF Futures (6–8)	Finals by surface Hard (0–0) Clay (6–8) Grass (0–0) Carpet (0–0)

Result	W–L	Date	Tournament	Tier	Surface	Partner	Opponents	Score
Loss	0–1	Aug 2007	Italy F25, Imperia	Futures	Clay	(Italy) Matteo Trevisan	(Italy) Matteo Marrai (Italy) Walter Trusendi	2–6, 3–6
Win	1–1	Jun 2009	Argentina F8, Rafaela	Futures	Clay	(Argentina) Nicolas Pastor	(Uruguay) Martín Cuevas (Argentina) Patricio Heras	6–2, 3–6, [10–6]
Loss	1–2	Sep 2009	Bolivia F2, Cochabamba	Futures	Clay	(Bolivia) Mauricio Doria-Medina	(Italy) Facundo Bagnis (Argentina) Guillermo Carry	4–6, 6–2, [5–10]
Loss	1–3	Nov 2009	Chile F4, Santiago	Futures	Clay	(Ecuador) Iván Endara	(Chile) Jorge Aguilar (Argentina) Diego Cristin	4–6, 1–6
Win	2–3	Feb 2010	Argentina F2, Tandil	Futures	Clay	(Argentina) Martín Alund	(Uruguay) Martín Cuevas (Argentina) German Gaich	6–3, 6–2
Loss	2–4	Apr 2010	Brazil F3, Brasília	Futures	Clay	(France) Jonathan Eysseric	(Brazil) Victor Maynard (Brazil) Nicolas Santos	4–6, 4–6
Win	3–4	Oct 2010	Paraguay F1, Lambare	Futures	Clay	(Paraguay) Diego Galeano	(Italy) Matteo Marrai (Italy) Marco Simoni	7–6^{(7–5)}, 6–2
Win	4–4	Oct 2010	Paraguay F2, Asunción	Futures	Clay	(Paraguay) Diego Galeano	(Paraguay) Gustavo Ramírez (Paraguay) José Benítez	7–6^{(7–2)}, 6–4
Win	5–4	Nov 2010	Paraguay F3, Encarnacion	Futures	Clay	(Paraguay) Diego Galeano	(Italy) Filippo Leonardi (Italy) Giammarco Micolani	7–5, 7–6^{(7–4)}
Loss	5–5	Nov 2010	Brazil F34, Foz do Iguaçu	Futures	Clay	(Paraguay) Diego Galeano	(Brazil) Guilherme Clezar (Brazil) André Ghem	1–6, 4–6
Loss	5–6	Jan 2011	Brazil F2, Salvador	Futures	Clay	(Paraguay) José Benítez	(Uruguay) Ariel Behar (Italy) Matteo Volante	3–6, 2–6
Loss	5–7	Apr 2011	Brazil F9, Santa Maria	Futures	Clay	(Argentina) Martin Rios-Benitez	(Canada) Steven Diez (Czech Republic) Roman Vögeli	6–7^{(5–7)}, 3–6
Loss	5–8	May 2011	Brazil F11, Aracaju	Futures	Clay	(Bolivia) Mauricio Doria-Medina	(Canada) Steven Diez (Czech Republic) Roman Vögeli	1–6, 6–7^{(0–7)}
Win	6–8	May 2011	Paraguay F1, Encarnacion	Futures	Clay	(Paraguay) Diego Galeano	(Chile) Cristóbal Saavedra-Corvalán (Argentina) Joaquin-Jesus Monteferrario	7–5, 6–3

=== Junior Grand Slam finals ===
==== Doubles: 1 (1 title) ====
Result	Year	Tournament	Surface	Partner	Opponents	Score
Win	2007	Wimbledon	Grass	(Italy) Matteo Trevisan	(Czech Republic) Roman Jebavý (Slovakia) Martin Kližan	7–6^{(7–5)}, 4–6, [10–8]
