= Xu Junchao =

Chinese tennis player

- Country (sports): China
- Born: 22 September 1988 (age 36)
- Prize money: $36,167

Singles
- Career record: 0–1
- Highest ranking: No. 588 (15 Sep 2008)

Doubles
- Career record: 0–1
- Highest ranking: No. 644 (25 May 2009)

Xu Junchao (born 22 September 1988) is a Chinese former professional tennis player.

Xu qualified for the main draw of the 2008 China Open, an ATP Tour tournament in Beijing, losing in the first round to Lu Yen-hsun. He represented China at the 2011 Summer Universiade.

== ITF Futures titles ==
=== Singles: (1) ===
No.	Date	Tournament	Surface	Opponent	Score
1.	Sep 2007	Indonesia F5, Jakarta	Hard	(Indonesia) Elbert Sie	6–2, 6–1

=== Doubles: (2) ===
No.	Date	Tournament	Surface	Partner	Opponents	Score
1.	Aug 2007	Spain F30, Bakio	Hard	(China) Gong Maoxin	(United Kingdom) Richard Brooks (Spain) Juan-Miguel Such-Pérez	6–2, 6–3
2.	May 2009	China F3, Taizhou	Hard	(China) Lu Hao	(China) Gong Maoxin (China) Zeng Shaoxuan	6–7^{(3)}, 6–4, [10–4]
