= Robin Roshardt =

Swiss tennis player

- Country (sports): Switzerland
- Born: 22 February 1988 (age 37) Zürich, Switzerland
- Plays: Right-handed
- Prize money: $28,008

Singles
- Career record: 0–2
- Career titles: 0; 0 Challenger, 1 Futures
- Highest ranking: No. 509 (13 April 2009)

Doubles
- Career record: 0–0
- Career titles: 0; 0 Challenger, 0 Futures
- Highest ranking: No. 1006 (15 June 2009)
- Last updated on: 10 November 2021.

Robin Roshardt (born 22 February 1988) is a Swiss former professional tennis player.

Roshardt, a son of Federation Cup player Claudia Pasquale, had a best ranking of four on the ITF junior circuit and was the 18 & Under Orange Bowl champion in 2005, becoming the third Swiss to win the title.

Unable to replicate his junior success on the men's tour, Roshardt's only two ATP Tour main draw appearances came at the Suisse Open Gstaad, as a wildcard entrant in both 2006 and 2008.

== ATP Challenger and ITF Futures finals ==
=== Singles: 3 (1–2) ===
Legend ATP Challenger (0–0) ITF Futures (1–2)	Finals by surface Hard (1–0) Clay (0–2) Grass (0–0) Carpet (0–0)

Result	W–L	Date	Tournament	Tier	Surface	Opponent	Score
Win	1–0	May 2008	Greece F3, Kalamata	Futures	Hard	(United Kingdom) Neil Bamford	6–3, 7–6^{(7–5)}
Loss	1–1	Jun 2008	Austria F4, Vandans	Futures	Clay	(Czech Republic) Filip Zeman	3–6, 2–6
Loss	1–2	Apr 2009	Turkey F3, Antalya	Futures	Clay	(Ukraine) Ivan Sergeyev	0–6, ret.
