= Jaak Põldma =

Estonian tennis player

- Country (sports): Estonia
- Born: 16 May 1988 (age 38) Tallinn, then part of Estonian SSR, Soviet Union
- Prize money: $5,357

Singles
- Career record: 3–6
- Career titles: 0; 1 Futures
- Highest ranking: No. 688 (27 July 2012)

Doubles
- Career record: 0–0
- Highest ranking: No. 1,067 (7 June 2010)

Jaak Põldma (born 16 May 1988) is a retired Estonian tennis player.

He has played for Estonia Davis Cup team.

== Career finals ==
=== Singles: 2 (1–1) ===
Legend Grand Slam tournaments (0–0) ATP World Tour Finals (0–0) ATP World Tour Masters 1000 (0–0) ATP World Tour 500 series (0–0) ATP World Tour 250 series (0–0) ATP Challengers (0–0) ITF Futures (1–1)	Titles by surface Hard (0–0) Clay (1–1) Grass (0–0)	Titles by setting Outdoors (1–1) Indoors (0–0)

Outcome	No.	Date	Tournament	Surface	Opponent	Score
Winner	1.	21 July 2008	Estonia F1, Tallinn, Estonia	Clay	(Sweden) Patrik Rosenholm	6–3, 6–4
Runner-up	1.	13 July 2009	Estonia F1, Tallinn, Estonia	Clay	(Estonia) Jürgen Zopp	6–3, 3–6, 4–6

=== Doubles: 2 (0–2) ===
Legend Grand Slam tournaments (0–0) ATP World Tour Finals (0–0) ATP World Tour Masters 1000 (0–0) ATP World Tour 500 series (0–0) ATP World Tour 250 series (0–0) ATP Challengers (0–0) ITF Futures (0–2)	Titles by surface Hard (0–0) Clay (0–2) Grass (0–0)	Titles by setting Outdoors (0–2) Indoors (0–0)

Outcome	No.	Date	Tournament	Surface	Partnering	Opponent	Score
Runner-up	1.	25 September 2006	Mexico F15, Los Mochis, Mexico	Clay	(United States) Brett Ross	(Italy) Luca Rovetta (Italy) Matteo Volante	2–6, 3–6
Runner-up	1.	13 July 2009	Estonia F1, Tallinn, Estonia	Clay	(Estonia) Mikk Irdoja	(Estonia) Mait Künnap (Estonia) Jürgen Zopp	4–6, 4–6
