= Luka Belić (tennis) =

Croatian tennis player

- Country (sports): Croatia
- Born: October 14, 1988 (age 36); Umag, SR Croatia, SFR Yugoslavia
- Height: 1.83 m (6 ft 0 in)
- Turned pro: 2004
- Plays: Right-handed (two-handed backhand)
- Prize money: $ 29,579

Singles
- Career record: 0–3
- Career titles: 0
- Highest ranking: No. 620 (18 May 2009)

Doubles
- Career record: 0–1
- Career titles: 0
- Highest ranking: No. 808 (24 August 2009)
- Last updated on: 19:14, 18 June 2012 (UTC).

Luka Belić (Croatian pronunciation: [lûːka bělitɕ, - běː-]; born 14 October 1988) is a former professional tennis player from Croatia, who played mainly on the ATP Challenger Tour and ITF Futures.

He reached his career-high singles ranking of World No. 620 on May 18, 2009.

In 2006 ATP Umag he lost the 1st round match to future world number one tennis player Novak Djokovic 3–6, 3–6.
