= Nicolas Santos =

Brazilian tennis player

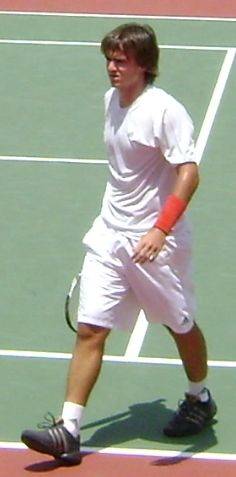
- Country (sports): Brazil
- Born: 5 January 1988 (age 37); Lucelia, Brazil
- Height: 6 ft 0 in (183 cm)
- Plays: Right-handed (two-handed backhand)
- Coach: Elson Longo
- Prize money: $91,891

Singles
- Career record: 0–0 (ATP Tour level, Grand Slam level, and Davis Cup)
- Career titles: 0; 0 Challenger, 3 Futures
- Highest ranking: No. 457 (29 April 2013)

Doubles
- Career record: 0–0 (ATP Tour level, Grand Slam level, and Davis Cup)
- Career titles: 0; 0 Challenger, 12 Futures
- Highest ranking: No. 349 (31 January 2011)
- Last updated on: May 21, 2021.

Nicolas Santos (born January 5, 1988) is a tennis player from Brazil. He was the number 2 ranked junior player in the world in 2006.

Santos has a career high ATP singles ranking of World No. 457, achieved on 29 April 2013. He also has a career high ATP doubles ranking of World number 349, achieved on 31 January 2011.

== Career ==
Santos won his first ITF Pro Circuit singles titles in Brasília in April 2011, beating Eládio Ribeiro Neto in the final in three sets. He earned his second career singles title in August 2012, beating Thiago Monteiro in the final, 6–2, 6–2, in São José do Rio Preto.

Santos has reached eight career singles finals, with a record of 3 wins and 5 losses all coming on the ITF Futures Circuit. Additionally, he has reached 34 doubles finals with a record of 12 wins and 22 losses, also all occurring at the ITF Futures level.

== ATP Challenger and ITF Futures finals ==
=== Singles: 8 (3–5) ===
Legend ATP Challenger (0–0) ITF Futures (3–5)	Finals by surface Hard (0–1) Clay (3–4) Grass (0–0) Carpet (0–0)

Result	W–L	Date	Tournament	Tier	Surface	Opponent	Score
Loss	0–1	Sep 2008	Brazil F20, Recife	Futures	Clay	(Brazil) Tiago Lopes	6–4, 5–7, 1–6
Loss	0–2	Feb 2009	Guatemala F1, Guatemala City	Futures	Hard	(Argentina) Federico Delbonis	3–6, 4–6
Win	1–2	Apr 2011	Brazil F10, Brasília	Futures	Clay	(Brazil) Eladio Ribeiro Neto	4–6, 6–2, 6–1
Loss	1–3	Jun 2011	Brazil F16, Marilia	Futures	Clay	(Brazil) Fabiano de Paula	5–7, 4–6
Loss	1–4	Aug 2012	Brazil F20, Lorena	Futures	Clay	(Brazil) José Pereira	3–6, 7–6^{(7–4)}, 3–6
Win	2–4	Aug 2012	Brazil F21, San Jose	Futures	Clay	(Brazil) Thiago Monteiro	6–2, 6–2
Win	3–4	Dec 2016	Colombia F9, Villavicencio	Futures	Clay	(Colombia) Daniel Elahi Galán	6–4, 6–2
Loss	3–5	Aug 2017	Argentina F4, Rosario	Futures	Clay	(Argentina) Hernán Casanova	2–6, 2–6

=== Doubles: 34 (12–22) ===
Legend ATP Challenger (0–0) ITF Futures (12–22)	Finals by surface Hard (3–5) Clay (9–17) Grass (0–0) Carpet (0–0)

Result	W–L	Date	Tournament	Tier	Surface	Partner	Opponents	Score
Win	1–0	Sep 2007	Brazil F14, Sorocaba	Futures	Clay	(Brazil) Fernando Romboli	(Brazil) Rodrigo-Antonio Grilli (Brazil) Raony Carvalho	6–2, 0–6, [10–4]
Loss	1–1	Sep 2007	Brazil F15, Recife	Futures	Clay	(Brazil) Fernando Romboli	(Spain) Adolfo Gomez-Pinter (Spain) Cesar Ferrer-Victoria	2–6, 4–6
Loss	1–2	Jun 2008	Brazil F8, Cuiabá	Futures	Clay	(Brazil) Daniel Dutra da Silva	(Brazil) Rafael Camilo (Brazil) Rodrigo Guidolin	2–6, 2–6
Loss	1–3	Jul 2008	USA F19, Godfrey	Futures	Hard	(Mexico) Daniel Garza	(United States) Conor Pollock (United States) Austin Krajicek	1–6, 7–6^{(8–6)}, [6–10]
Loss	1–4	Oct 2008	Brazil F22, São Paulo	Futures	Clay	(Brazil) Fernando Romboli	(Brazil) Diego Matos (Argentina) Joaquin Monteferrario	6–4, 3–6, [8–10]
Loss	1–5	Oct 2008	Brazil F25, Porto Alegre	Futures	Clay	(Brazil) Andre Vidaller	(Brazil) Diego Matos (Brazil) Rafael Camilo	5–7, 4–6
Loss	1–6	Feb 2009	Guatemala F1, Guatemala City	Futures	Hard	(Brazil) Rafael Camilo	(Germany) Holger Fischer (Germany) Lars Pörschke	6–7^{(7–9)}, 1–6
Loss	1–7	Feb 2009	Costa Rica F1, San José	Futures	Hard	(Brazil) Rafael Camilo	(United States) Rylan Rizza (United States) Kaes Van't Hof	3–6, 1–6
Win	2–7	May 2009	Brazil F2, Caldas Novas	Futures	Hard	(Brazil) Fernando Romboli	(Brazil) Leonardo Kirche (Argentina) Juan-Manuel Valverde	6–7^{(5–7)}, 6–4, [10–7]
Win	3–7	Apr 2010	Brazil F3, Brasília	Futures	Clay	(Brazil) Victor Maynard	(Italy) Daniel Lopez Cassaccia (France) Jonathan Eysseric	6–4, 6–4
Win	4–7	Aug 2010	Brazil F17, Uberlândia	Futures	Clay	(Brazil) Victor Maynard	(Brazil) Idio Escobar (Brazil) Danilo Ferraz	4–6, 7–5, [10–2]
Win	5–7	Oct 2010	Brazil F29, São Leopoldo	Futures	Clay	(Brazil) Fernando Romboli	(Brazil) Fabrício Neis (Brazil) José Pereira	6–4, 6–2
Loss	5–8	Oct 2010	Brazil F30, Porto Alegre	Futures	Clay	(Brazil) Fernando Romboli	(Argentina) Juan-Pablo Villar (Italy) Giorgio Portaluri	3–6, 5–7
Win	6–8	Nov 2010	Brazil F31, Porto Alegre	Futures	Clay	(Brazil) Daniel Dutra da Silva	(Brazil) Diego Matos (Brazil) André Miele	6–4, 6–1
Win	7–8	Nov 2010	Brazil F32, Barueri	Futures	Hard	(Brazil) Victor Maynard	(Brazil) Fernando Romboli (Brazil) Rodrigo-Antonio Grilli	6–3, 6–3
Loss	7–9	Dec 2010	Brazil F37, Guarulhos	Futures	Clay	(Brazil) Victor Maynard	(Brazil) Gabriel Dias (Brazil) Leonardo Kirche	4–6, 6–7^{(8–10)}
Loss	7–10	Sep 2011	Brazil F29, Arapongas	Futures	Clay	(Brazil) Diego Matos	(Brazil) José Pereira (Brazil) Bruno Semenzato	3–6, 5–7
Win	8–10	May 2012	Brazil F9, Goiânia	Futures	Clay	(Brazil) Ricardo Siggia	(Brazil) José Pereira (Brazil) Fabrício Neis	6–3, 7–6^{(8–6)}
Loss	8–11	Jun 2012	Peru F3, Lima	Futures	Clay	(Brazil) Ricardo Siggia	(Argentina) Facundo Mena (Argentina) Juan Pablo Ortiz	1–6, 3–6
Loss	8–12	Sep 2012	Brazil F27, Belém	Futures	Hard	(Brazil) João Pedro Sorgi	(Brazil) Guilherme Clezar (Brazil) Fabrício Neis	0–6, 6–7^{(6–8)}
Win	9–12	Nov 2012	Brazil F34, Foz do Iguaçu	Futures	Clay	(Brazil) Fabrício Neis	(Brazil) Diego Matos (Argentina) Patricio Heras	6–4, 6–3
Win	10–12	Dec 2012	Brazil F35, Gramado	Futures	Hard	(Brazil) Fabrício Neis	(Brazil) Caio Zampieri (Brazil) Marcelo Demoliner	5–7, 6–4, [10–4]
Loss	10–13	Dec 2012	Brazil F36, Porto Alegre	Futures	Clay	(Brazil) Fabrício Neis	(Brazil) Caio Silva (Brazil) Augusto Laranja	6–3, 4–6, [10–12]
Loss	10–14	Aug 2013	Brazil F3, Porto Velho	Futures	Hard	(Brazil) Fabrício Neis	(Brazil) José Pereira (Brazil) Alexandre Tsuchiya	6–7^{(5–7)}, 2–6
Loss	10–15	Sep 2014	Peru F5, Lima	Futures	Clay	(Brazil) Augusto Laranja	(Brazil) Fabrício Neis (Brazil) Alexandre Tsuchiya	6–1, 3–6, [5–10]
Win	11–15	Oct 2016	Colombia F6, Neiva	Futures	Clay	(Brazil) Caio Silva	(Colombia) Juan Sebastián Gómez (Colombia) Juan Montes	6–3, 6–4
Win	12–15	Nov 2016	Colombia F8, Medellín	Futures	Clay	(Brazil) Oscar Jose Gutierrez	(Colombia) Juan Sebastián Gómez (United States) Adam El Mihdawy	6–4, 6–3
Loss	12–16	Dec 2016	Colombia F9, Villavicencio	Futures	Clay	(Brazil) Oscar Jose Gutierrez	(Italy) Davide Pontoglio (Italy) Giorgio Portaluri	7–6^{(14–12)}, 4–6, [8–10]
Loss	12–17	Dec 2016	Uruguay F2, Paysandú	Futures	Clay	(Brazil) Oscar Jose Gutierrez	(Brazil) Rafael Matos (Brazil) Joao Menezes	0–6, 4–6
Loss	12–18	Feb 2017	Tunisia F7, Hammamet	Futures	Clay	(Brazil) Oscar Jose Gutierrez	(Bosnia and Herzegovina) Tomislav Brkić (Serbia) Nikola Ćaćić	3–6, 2–6
Loss	12–19	Mar 2017	Tunisia F8, Hammamet	Futures	Clay	(Brazil) Oscar Jose Gutierrez	(France) Maxime Chazal (Germany) Peter Torebko	6–7^{(2–7)}, 4–6
Loss	12–20	Mar 2017	Tunisia F10, Hammamet	Futures	Clay	(Brazil) Oscar Jose Gutierrez	(Spain) Oriol Roca Batalla (Spain) Pol Toledo Bagué	4–6. 6–7^{(5–7)}
Loss	12–21	Jun 2017	Argentina F2, Córdoba	Futures	Clay	(Brazil) André Miele	(Argentina) Facundo Argüello (Argentina) Tomás Lipovšek Puches	2–6. 2–6
Loss	12–22	Mar 2018	Turkey F9, Antalya	Futures	Clay	(Brazil) Oscar Jose Gutierrez	(Mexico) Luis Patiño (Ukraine) Oleg Prihodko	6–3. 3–6, [8–10]

== Sources ==
- Nicolas Santos at the Association of Tennis Professionals
- Nicolas Santos at the International Tennis Federation
