= 2006 Wimbledon Championships – Men's doubles qualifying =

Men's doubles qualifying
- 2006 Wimbledon Championships

Events
Singles	men	women		boys	girls
Doubles	men	women	mixed	boys	girls
WC Singles	men	women	quad
WC Doubles	men	women	quad
Legends	men	women	seniors

Qualification
Singles	men	women
Doubles	men	women
- Wimbledon Championships

Players and pairs who neither have high enough rankings nor receive wild cards may participate in a qualifying tournament held one week before the annual Wimbledon Tennis Championships.

== Seeds ==
1. (United States) Eric Butorac / (United States) Chris Drake (first round)
2. (Italy) Flavio Cipolla / (United States) Mirko Pehar (first round)
3. (United States) Jeff Morrison / (United States) Rajeev Ram (first round)
4. (South Africa) Rik de Voest / (Australia) Nathan Healey (first round)
5. (India) Rohan Bopanna / (Sweden) Johan Landsberg (first round)
6. (Thailand) Sanchai Ratiwatana / (Thailand) Sonchat Ratiwatana (qualifying competition, lucky losers)
7. (Italy) Alessandro Motti / (Netherlands) Jasper Smit (first round)
8. (Paraguay) Ramón Delgado / (Brazil) André Sá (qualified)

== Qualifiers ==
1. (Georgia (country)) Irakli Labadze / (Serbia) Dušan Vemić
2. (United Kingdom) Neil Bamford / (United Kingdom) Jim May
3. (Paraguay) Ramón Delgado / (Brazil) André Sá
4. (United States) Kevin Kim / (Philippines) Cecil Mamiit

== Lucky losers ==
1. (Thailand) Sanchai Ratiwatana / (Thailand) Sonchat Ratiwatana
2. (United States) Zack Fleishman / (Australia) Robert Smeets
3. (Czech Republic) Tomáš Cakl / (Czech Republic) Pavel Šnobel
4. (Canada) Frédéric Niemeyer / (United States) Glenn Weiner

== Qualifying draw ==
=== First qualifier ===
First round

Qualifying competition

1
- (United States) Eric Butorac
- (United States) Chris Drake
6
6^{6}
3

Alt
- (Canada) Frédéric Niemeyer
- (United States) Glenn Weiner
2
7^{8}
6

Alt
- (Canada) Frédéric Niemeyer
- (United States) Glenn Weiner
4
6^{6}
6
4

Alt
- (Georgia (country)) Irakli Labadze
- (Serbia) Dušan Vemić
6
7^{8}
3
6

Alt
- (Georgia (country)) Irakli Labadze
- (Serbia) Dušan Vemić
6
5
6

5
- (India) Rohan Bopanna
- (Sweden) Johan Landsberg
4
7
4

=== Second qualifier ===
First round

Qualifying competition

2
- (Italy) Flavio Cipolla
- (United States) Mirko Pehar
2
6^{8}

- (Czech Republic) Tomáš Cakl
- (Czech Republic) Pavel Šnobel
6
7^{10}

- (Czech Republic) Tomáš Cakl
- (Czech Republic) Pavel Šnobel
4
3
6
2

WC
- (United Kingdom) Neil Bamford
- (United Kingdom) Jim May
6
6
4
6

WC
- (United Kingdom) Neil Bamford
- (United Kingdom) Jim May
6
7^{7}

7
- (Italy) Alessandro Motti
- (Netherlands) Jasper Smit
3
6^{5}

=== Third qualifier ===
First round

Qualifying competition

3
- (United States) Jeff Morrison
- (United States) Rajeev Ram
4
4

- (United States) Zack Fleishman
- (Australia) Robert Smeets
6
6

- (United States) Zack Fleishman
- (Australia) Robert Smeets
4
2
6
2

8
- (Paraguay) Ramón Delgado
- (Brazil) André Sá
6
6
4
6

- (Mexico) Santiago González
- (Argentina) Diego Hartfield
5
3

8
- (Paraguay) Ramón Delgado
- (Brazil) André Sá
7
6

=== Fourth qualifier ===
First round

Qualifying competition

4
- (South Africa) Rik de Voest
- (Australia) Nathan Healey
4
5

- (United States) Kevin Kim
- (Philippines) Cecil Mamiit
6
7

- (United States) Kevin Kim
- (Philippines) Cecil Mamiit
6
6
6

6
- (Thailand) Sanchai Ratiwatana
- (Thailand) Sonchat Ratiwatana
3
2
4

- (Switzerland) Jean-Claude Scherrer
- (Germany) Lars Uebel
6^{3}
3

6
- (Thailand) Sanchai Ratiwatana
- (Thailand) Sonchat Ratiwatana
7^{7}
6
