= 2006 ITF Men's Circuit =

Details

Achievements (singles)

The 2006 ITF Men's Circuit was the 2006 edition of the third-tier tour for men's professional tennis. It was organised by the International Tennis Federation and is a tier below the ATP Challenger Tour. The ITF Men's Circuit included satellite events and 455 'Futures' tournaments played year round across six continents, with prize money ranging from $10,000 to $15,000.

== Futures events ==
$15,000 tournaments
$10,000 tournaments

=== January ===
Tournament	Date	City	Surface	Singles champions	Doubles champions
Germany F1 Futures $15,000	January 2	Nussloch; Germany	Carpet (i)	(Germany) Andreas Beck	(Denmark) Frederik Nielsen (Denmark) Rasmus Nørby
Great Britain F1 Futures $15,000	January 2	Exmouth; Great Britain	Carpet (i)	(Latvia) Andis Juška	(United Kingdom) Colin Fleming (United Kingdom) Jamie Murray
El Salvador F1 Futures $10,000	January 9	Nueva San Salvador; El Salvador	Clay	(France) Xavier Pujo	(Argentina) Eduardo Schwank (Uruguay) Martín Vilarrubí
USA F1 Futures $10,000	January 9	Tampa; United States	Hard	(United States) Jesse Witten	(United States) Alex Kuznetsov (Romania) Horia Tecău
China F1 Futures $15,000	January 9	Jiangmen; China	Hard	(Serbia and Montenegro) Alex Vlaški	(South Korea) Jun Woong-sun (South Korea) Kim Sun-yong
Germany F2 Futures $10,000	January 9	Stuttgart; Germany	Hard (i)	(Germany) Torsten Popp	(Switzerland) Stéphane Bohli (New Zealand) Artem Sitak
Spain F1 Futures $10,000	January 9	Menorca; Spain	Clay	(Spain) Pablo Santos	(Spain) Guillem Burniol (Spain) José Antonio Sánchez de Luna
Great Britain F2 Futures $15,000	January 9	Barnstaple; Great Britain	Hard (i)	(France) Stéphane Robert	(United Kingdom) Josh Goodall (United Kingdom) Ross Hutchins
Guatemala F1 Futures $10,000	January 16	Guatemala City; Guatemala	Hard	(Dominican Republic) Jhonson García	(El Salvador) Rafael Arévalo (Dominican Republic) Jhonson García
USA F2 Futures $10,000	January 16	Kissimmee; United States	Hard	(United States) Scoville Jenkins	(United States) Alex Kuznetsov (United States) Scott Oudsema
China F2 Futures $15,000	January 16	Jiangmen; China	Hard	(Israel) Amir Hadad	(South Korea) Jun Woong-sun (South Korea) Kim Sun-yong
Spain F2 Futures $10,000	January 16	Calvià; Spain	Clay	(Spain) Juan-Miguel Such-Perez	(Spain) Miquel Perez Puigdomenech (Spain) Gabriel Trujillo Soler
Austria F1 Futures $15,000	January 16	Bergheim; Austria	Carpet (i)	(Latvia) Ernests Gulbis	(Sweden) Johan Brunström (United States) Phil Stolt
Germany F3 Futures $10,000	January 16	Oberhaching; Germany	Hard (i)	(Germany) Tobias Summerer	(Sweden) Ervin Eleskovic (Germany) Mischa Zverev
Mexico F1 Futures $15,000	January 23	Naucalpan; Mexico	Hard	(United States) Sam Warburg	(United States) Nicholas Monroe (United States) Sam Warburg
Colombia F1 Futures $15,000	January 23	Manizales; Colombia	Clay	(Uruguay) Pablo Cuevas	(Uruguay) Pablo Cuevas (Argentina) Horacio Zeballos
USA F3 Futures $10,000	January 23	Boca Raton; United States	Hard	(United States) Phillip Simmonds	(United States) Jeremy Wurtzman (United States) Brian Wilson
Spain F3 Futures $10,000	January 23	Llucmajor; Spain	Clay	(Italy) Francesco Piccari	(Spain) Miquel Perez Puigdomenech (Spain) Gabriel Trujillo Soler
France F1 Futures $10,000	January 23	Deauville; France	Clay (i)	(France) Jordane Doble	(Italy) Marco Crugnola (Italy) Alessandro Da Col
Austria F2 Futures $15,000	January 23	Bergheim; Austria	Carpet (i)	(Slovakia) Lukáš Lacko	(Austria) Werner Eschauer (Romania) Florin Mergea
Germany F4 Futures $10,000	January 23	Kaarst; Germany	Carpet (i)	(Czech Republic) Jakub Hasek	(Germany) Ralph Grambow (Germany) Bastian Knittel
Costa Rica F1 Futures $10,000	January 30	San José; Costa Rica	Hard	(United States) Nicholas Monroe	(United States) Nicholas Monroe (United States) Sam Warburg
Colombia F2 Futures $15,000	January 30	Bucaramanga; Colombia	Clay	(Uruguay) Marcel Felder	(Argentina) Brian Dabul (Uruguay) Marcel Felder
Spain F4 Futures $10,000	January 30	Yecla; Spain	Hard	(Spain) Juan-Miguel Such-Perez	(Spain) David Marrero (Spain) Gabriel Trujillo Soler
France F2 Futures $10,000	January 30	Feucherolles; France	Hard (i)	(Algeria) Slimane Saoudi	(United Kingdom) David Corrie (Germany) Sebastian Fitz
Germany F5 Futures $15,000	January 30	Mettmann; Germany	Carpet (i)	(Germany) Mischa Zverev	(Germany) Philipp Petzschner (United States) Phil Stolt

=== February ===
Tournament	Date	City	Surface	Singles champions	Doubles champions
Panama F1 Futures $10,000	February 6	Panama City; Panama	Clay	(Germany) Alexander Satschko	(Colombia) Michael Quintero (Argentina) Emiliano Redondi
Spain F5 Futures $10,000	February 6	Murcia; Spain	Clay	(Spain) Pablo Santos	(Spain) David Marrero (Spain) Pablo Santos
France F3 Futures $10,000	February 6	Bressuire; France	Hard (i)	(France) Gary Lugassy	(Togo) Komlavi Loglo (Ivory Coast) Valentin Sanon
Australia F1 Futures $15,000	February 13	Sydney; Australia	Hard	(Czech Republic) Radim Žitko	(Australia) Sadik Kadir (Australia) Robert Smeets
Mexico F2 Futures $10,000	February 13	Mexico City; Mexico	Hard	(Moldova) Roman Borvanov	(United States) Scott Schnugg (United States) Nathaniel Schnugg
Spain F6 Futures $10,000	February 13	Murcia; Spain	Clay	(Romania) Victor Crivoi	(Romania) Victor Ioniță (Romania) Gabriel Moraru
Italy F1 Futures $10,000	February 13	Bari; Italy	Clay (i)	(Italy) Daniele Giorgini	(Italy) Marco Crugnola (Italy) Alessandro Da Col
Croatia F1 Futures $15,000	February 13	Zagreb; Croatia	Hard (i)	(Croatia) Marin Čilić	(France) Jean-François Bachelot (France) Nicolas Tourte
Australia F2 Futures $15,000	February 20	Wollongong; Australia	Hard	(Japan) Satoshi Iwabuchi	(United States) Scott Lipsky (United States) David Martin
Nigeria F1 Futures $15,000	February 20	Benin City; Nigeria	Hard	(Portugal) Fred Gil	(Nigeria) Abdul-Mumin Babalola (Nigeria) Jonathan Igbinovia
USA F4 Futures $15,000	February 20	Brownsville; United States	Hard	(United States) Michael Russell	(India) Harsh Mankad (United States) Jeremy Wurtzman
Spain F7 Futures $10,000	February 20	Cartagena; Spain	Clay	(Spain) Pablo Santos	(Spain) David Marrero (Spain) Pablo Santos
Italy F2 Futures $15,000	February 20	Trento; Italy	Hard (i)	(Italy) Alberto Giraudo	(Italy) Thomas Holzer (Italy) Simone Vagnozzi
Croatia F2 Futures $15,000	February 20	Zagreb; Croatia	Hard (i)	(Germany) Mischa Zverev	(Croatia) Petar Jelenić (Croatia) Vilim Visak
Israel F1 Futures $10,000	February 20	Ramat HaSharon; Israel	Hard	(Israel) Amir Hadad	(France) Antoine Benneteau (France) Frederic Jeanclaude
Poland F1 Futures $10,000	February 20	Szczecin; Poland	Hard (i)	(Austria) Armin Sandbichler	(Poland) Tomasz Bednarek (Poland) Maciej Diłaj
New Zealand F1 Futures $15,000	February 27	Blenheim; New Zealand	Hard	(Greece) Konstantinos Economidis	(Netherlands) Jasper Smit (Netherlands Antilles) Martijn van Haasteren
USA F5 Futures $15,000	February 27	Harlingen; United States	Hard	(United States) Jesse Witten	(United States) Brendan Evans (United States) Tim Smyczek
China F3 Futures $10,000	February 27	Shenzhen; China	Hard	(Netherlands) Jesse Huta Galung	(Netherlands) Jesse Huta Galung (Netherlands) Antal van der Duim
Italy F3 Futures $10,000	February 27	Castel Gandolfo; Italy	Clay	(Italy) Daniele Giorgini	(Italy) Alberto Brizzi (Italy) Simone Vagnozzi
Israel F2 Futures $10,000	February 27	Ra'anana; Israel	Hard	(Israel) Andy Ram	(Monaco) Benjamin Balleret (Monaco) Clément Morel
Switzerland F1 Futures $10,000	February 27	Wilen; Switzerland	Carpet (i)	(Italy) Andrea Stoppini	(Germany) Dustin Brown (Germany) Tobias Klein
Poland F2 Futures $10,000	February 27	Wrocław; Poland	Hard (i)	(Monaco) Thomas Oger	(Russia) Vadim Davletshin (Ukraine) Mikhail Filima
Nigeria F2 Futures $15,000	February 27	Benin City; Nigeria	Hard	(United States) Nicholas Monroe	(Nigeria) Abdul-Mumin Babalola (Nigeria) Jonathan Igbinovia

=== March ===
Tournament	Date	City	Surface	Singles champions	Doubles champions
Canada F1 Futures $10,000	March 6	Laval, Quebec; Canada	Hard (i)	(United States) Brian Wilson	(South Africa) Izak van der Merwe (United States) Jeremy Wurtzman
Egypt F1 Futures $10,000	March 6	Cairo; Egypt	Clay	(Czech Republic) Michal Navrátil	(Russia) Mikhail Elgin (New Zealand) Adam Thompson
Mexico F3 Futures $10,000	March 6	Chetumal; Mexico	Hard	(Uruguay) Marcel Felder	(Mexico) Bruno Echagaray (Mexico) Carlos Palencia
New Zealand F2 Futures $15,000	March 6	Hamilton; New Zealand	Hard	(Greece) Konstantinos Economidis	(Netherlands) Jasper Smit (Netherlands Antilles) Martijn van Haasteren
Morocco F1 Futures $10,000	March 6	Agadir; Morocco	Clay	(Morocco) Mehdi Tahiri	(Italy) Fabio Colangelo (Italy) Marco Crugnola
USA F6 Futures $15,000	March 6	McAllen; United States	Hard	(Germany) Benedikt Dorsch	(Canada) Pierre-Ludovic Duclos (New Zealand) Wesley Whitehouse
China F4 Futures $10,000	March 6	Jiangmen; China	Hard	(China) Yu Xinyuan	(China) Yu Xinyuan (China) Zeng Shaoxuan
Italy F4 Futures $10,000	March 6	Syracuse; Italy	Clay	(Italy) Fabio Fognini	(Belgium) Jeroen Masson (Spain) Gabriel Trujillo Soler
Israel F3 Futures $10,000	March 6	Haifa; Israel	Hard	(Israel) Dekel Valtzer	(Israel) Dekel Valtzer (Israel) Amir Weintraub
Switzerland F2 Futures $10,000	March 6	Leuggern; Switzerland	Carpet (i)	(Latvia) Ernests Gulbis	(Germany) Dustin Brown (Germany) Tobias Klein
Poland F3 Futures $10,000	March 6	Zabrze; Poland	Hard (i)	(Czech Republic) Lukáš Rosol	(Ukraine) Mikhail Filima (Czech Republic) Lukáš Rosol
Great Britain F3 Futures $15,000	March 6	Sunderland; Great Britain	Hard (i)	(United Kingdom) Martin Lee	(Spain) Daniel Muñoz de la Nava (Italy) Alessandro Motti
Canada F2 Futures $10,000	March 13	Rock Forest; Canada	Hard (i)	(Netherlands) Robin Haase	(Canada) Érik Chvojka (Canada) Philip Gubenco
Australia F3 Futures $15,000	March 13	Lyneham; Australia	Clay	(Greece) Konstantinos Economidis	(Argentina) Damián Patriarca (Australia) Joseph Sirianni
Egypt F2 Futures $10,000	March 13	Port Said; Egypt	Clay	(Czech Republic) Jan Masik	(Ukraine) Alexandr Dolgopolov (Italy) Giancarlo Petrazzuolo
Mexico F4 Futures $10,000	March 13	Cancún; Mexico	Hard	(Mexico) Miguel Gallardo Valles	(Dominican Republic) Jhonson García (Venezuela) Yohny Romero
Morocco F2 Futures $10,000	March 13	Marrakesh; Morocco	Clay	(France) Éric Prodon	(Italy) Fabio Colangelo (Italy) Marco Crugnola
China F5 Futures $10,000	March 13	Guangzhou; China	Hard	(United States) Jonathan Chu	(United States) Jamie Cerretani (Netherlands) Jesse Huta Galung
Italy F5 Futures $15,000	March 13	Caltanissetta; Italy	Clay	(Austria) Werner Eschauer	(Italy) Enrico Burzi (Italy) Massimo Ocera
Portugal F1 Futures $10,000	March 13	Faro; Portugal	Hard	(Spain) Marcel Granollers	(Italy) Alessandro Da Col (Spain) Marcel Granollers
France F4 Futures $15,000	March 13	Lille; France	Hard (i)	(France) Jo-Wilfried Tsonga	(Switzerland) Stéphane Bohli (New Zealand) Artem Sitak
Switzerland F3 Futures $10,000	March 13	Oberentfelden; Switzerland	Carpet (i)	(Germany) Philipp Marx	(Sweden) Carl-Henrik Hansen (Denmark) Frederik Nielsen
Great Britain F4 Futures $15,000	March 13	Manchester; Great Britain	Hard (i)	(United Kingdom) Richard Bloomfield	(France) Jean-François Bachelot (Pakistan) Aisam-ul-Haq Qureshi
Korea Rep. F1 Futures $15,000	March 13	Andong; South Korea	Hard	(South Korea) Kwon Oh-hee	(South Korea) An Jae-sung (South Korea) Chung Hee-seok
Argentina F1 Futures $10,000	March 13	Buenos Aires; Argentina	Clay	(Argentina) Cristian Villagrán	(Argentina) Sebastián Decoud (Argentina) Antonio Pastorino
Canada F3 Futures $10,000	March 20	Montreal; Canada	Hard (i)	(United States) Nikita Kryvonos	(Canada) Érik Chvojka (Canada) Philip Gubenco
Australia F4 Futures $15,000	March 20	Bairnsdale; Australia	Clay	(Greece) Konstantinos Economidis	(Argentina) Damián Patriarca (Australia) Joseph Sirianni
Cuba F1 Futures $10,000	March 20	Havana; Cuba	Hard	(Uruguay) Martín Vilarrubí	(Uruguay) Marcel Felder (Uruguay) Martín Vilarrubí
Morocco F3 Futures $10,000	March 20	Khemisset; Morocco	Clay	(Czech Republic) Dušan Karol	(France) Jérémy Chardy (Czech Republic) Dušan Karol
USA F7 Futures $15,000	March 20	Little Rock; United States	Hard	(United States) Wayne Odesnik	(Colombia) Michael Quintero (New Zealand) Wesley Whitehouse
Italy F6 Futures $10,000	March 20	Catania; Italy	Clay	(Austria) Werner Eschauer	(Brazil) Marcelo Melo (Brazil) Rogério Dutra Silva
Portugal F2 Futures $10,000	March 20	Lagos; Portugal	Hard	(Spain) Adrián Menéndez Maceiras	(Spain) Marcel Granollers (Portugal) Rui Machado
France F5 Futures $15,000	March 20	Poitiers; France	Hard (i)	(Belgium) Stefan Wauters	(United States) Eric Butorac (United States) Chris Drake
Egypt F3 Futures $10,000	March 20	Cairo; Egypt	Clay	(Ukraine) Alexandr Dolgopolov	(Egypt) Mahmoud Bahaa Hamed (Egypt) Sherif Sabry
Korea Rep. F2 Futures $15,000	March 20	Andong; Korea Rep.	Hard	(Belarus) Vladimir Voltchkov	(South Korea) An Jae-sung (South Korea) Chung Hee-seok
Argentina F2 Futures $10,000	March 20	Buenos Aires; Argentina	Clay	(Argentina) Cristian Villagrán	(Argentina) Brian Dabul (Argentina) Cristian Villagrán
Great Britain F5 Futures $15,000	March 27	Bath; Great Britain		(France) Jo-Wilfried Tsonga	(Germany) Tobias Clemens (Australia) Rameez Junaid
Korea Rep. F3 Futures $15,000	March 27	Seogwipo; Korea Rep.	Hard	(United States) Sam Warburg	(South Korea) Jun Woong-sun (South Korea) Kim Sun-yong
United Arab Emirates F1 Futures $15,000	March 27	Dubai; United Arab Emirates		(Germany) Philipp Petzschner	(Switzerland) Marco Chiudinelli (Germany) Philipp Petzschner
Australia F5 Futures $15,000	March 27	Sale; Australia	Clay	(Greece) Konstantinos Economidis	(Argentina) Damián Patriarca (Australia) Joseph Sirianni
USA F8 Futures $15,000	March 27	Mobile; United States	Hard	(United States) Wayne Odesnik	(United States) Kelly Jones (United States) Pete Stroer
Spain F8 Futures $10,000	March 27	Zaragoza; Spain	Clay	(Spain) Pablo Santos	(Spain) David Marrero (Spain) Pablo Santos
Italy F7 Futures $10,000	March 27	Monterotondo; Italy	Clay	(Italy) Francesco Piccari	(Brazil) Marcelo Melo (Brazil) Rogério Dutra Silva
Portugal F3 Futures $10,000	March 27	Albufeira; Portugal	Hard	(Portugal) Fred Gil	(Portugal) Fred Gil (Portugal) Gonçalo Nicau
Sweden F1 Futures $10,000	March 27	Malmö; Sweden	Hard (i)	(Austria) Stefan Wiespeiner	(Denmark) Frederik Nielsen (Denmark) Rasmus Nørby
Argentina F3 Futures $10,000	March 27	Buenos Aires; Argentina	Clay	(Argentina) Eduardo Schwank	(Argentina) Brian Dabul (Argentina) Cristian Villagrán
Cuba F2 Futures $10,000	March 27	Havana; Cuba	Hard	(Venezuela) Yohny Romero	(Cuba) Ricardo Chile (Cuba) Sandor Martínez

=== April ===
Tournament	Date	City	Surface	Singles champions	Doubles champions
United Arab Emirates F2 Futures $15,000	April 3	Dubai; United Arab Emirates	Hard	(Serbia and Montenegro) Viktor Troicki	(Serbia and Montenegro) Viktor Troicki (Germany) Mischa Zverev
Spain F9 Futures $10,000	April 3	Málaga; Spain	Clay	(Spain) Mariano Albert-Ferrando	(Spain) Mariano Albert-Ferrando (Spain) Daniel Monedero
Italy F8 Futures $10,000	April 3	Frascati; Italy	Clay	(Romania) Victor Ioniță	(Italy) Giancarlo Petrazzuolo (Italy) Federico Torresi
Sweden F2 Futures $10,000	April 3	Linköping; Sweden	Carpet (i)	(Sweden) Marcus Sarstrand	(Denmark) Frederik Nielsen (Denmark) Rasmus Nørby
France F6 Futures $15,000	April 3	Grasse; France	Clay	(France) Nicolas Coutelot	(France) Patrice Atias (France) Jonathan Eysseric
Great Britain F6 Futures $15,000	April 3	Bath; Great Britain	Hard (i)	(France) Jo-Wilfried Tsonga	(France) Jean-François Bachelot (France) Jean-Michel Pequery
Italy F9 Futures $15,000	April 10	Eur, Rome; Italy	Clay	(Argentina) Antonio Pastorino	(Italy) Marco Di Vuolo (Argentina) Antonio Pastorino
Sweden F3 Futures $10,000	April 10	Norrköping; Sweden	Hard (i)	(Denmark) Frederik Nielsen	(Denmark) Frederik Nielsen (Netherlands) Jasper Smit
France F7 Futures $15,000	April 10	Angers; France	Clay (i)	(Switzerland) Stéphane Bohli	(Belgium) Dominique Coene (Kazakhstan) Evgeny Korolev
Spain F10 Futures $10,000	April 10	Loja; Spain	Clay	(Spain) Pablo Santos	(Spain) Daniel Muñoz de la Nava (Spain) Jordi Marse-Vidri
Uzbekistan F1 Futures $15,000	April 10	Qarshi; Uzbekistan	Hard	(Uzbekistan) Denis Istomin	(Uzbekistan) Murad Inoyatov (Uzbekistan) Denis Istomin
Uruguay F1 Futures $10,000	April 10	Punta del Este; Uruguay	Clay	(Argentina) Sebastián Decoud	(Argentina) Diego Cristin (Uruguay) Martín Vilarrubí
Morocco F4 Futures $15,000	April 10	Oujda; Morocco	Clay	(Czech Republic) Michal Navrátil	(Germany) Peter Mayer Tischer (Czech Republic) Michal Navrátil
Japan F1 Futures $10,000	April 10	Tokyo; Japan	Hard	(Japan) Satoshi Iwabuchi	(Japan) Tasuku Iwami (Japan) Takahiro Terachi
Japan F2 Futures $10,000	April 17	Kofu; Japan	Carpet	(South Korea) Jun Woong-sun	(South Korea) Jun Woong-sun (South Korea) Kim Sun-yong
Morocco F5 Futures $15,000	April 17	Rabat; Morocco	Clay	(Algeria) Lamine Ouahab	(Italy) Enrico Burzi (Czech Republic) Dušan Karol
Uruguay F2 Futures $10,000	April 17	Montevideo; Uruguay	Clay	(Argentina) Cristian Villagrán	(Argentina) Brian Dabul (Uruguay) Marcel Felder
Uzbekistan F2 Futures $15,000	April 17	Gulistan; Uzbekistan	Hard	(Romania) Teodor-Dacian Crăciun	(Russia) Mikhail Elgin (Kazakhstan) Alexey Kedryuk
Spain F11 Futures $10,000	April 17	Melilla; Spain	Hard	(France) Adrian Mannarino	(Spain) Carlos Rexach-Itoiz (Germany) Eric Scherer
Italy F10 Futures $15,000	April 17	Cremona; Italy	Hard	(France) Xavier Audouy	(France) Jean-François Bachelot (France) David Guez
Italy F11 Futures $10,000	April 24	Padua; Italy	Clay	(Italy) Daniele Giorgini	(Poland) Maciej Diłaj (Australia) Raphael Durek
Spain F12 Futures $10,000	April 24	Lleida; Spain	Clay	(Spain) Frank Cóndor	(Spain) Miguel Ángel López Jaén (Spain) Pablo Santos
Argentina F4 Futures $10,000	April 24	Buenos Aires; Argentina	Clay	(Argentina) Eduardo Schwank	(Argentina) Sebastián Decoud (Argentina) Eduardo Schwank
Japan F3 Futures $10,000	April 24	Shizuoka; Japan	Carpet	(South Korea) Jun Woong-sun	(Japan) Hiroki Kondo (Japan) Takahiro Terachi

=== May ===
Tournament	Date	City	Surface	Singles champions	Doubles champions
Colombia F3 Futures $15,000	May 1	Cali; Colombia	Clay	(Colombia) Santiago Giraldo	(Chile) Jorge Aguilar (Mexico) Daniel Garza
Romania F1 Futures $10,000	May 1	Bucharest; Romania	Clay	(France) Jordane Doble	(Austria) Martin Fischer (Austria) Philipp Oswald
Argentina F5 Futures $10,000	May 1	Buenos Aires; Argentina	Clay	(Argentina) Cristian Villagrán	(Argentina) Brian Dabul (Argentina) Cristian Villagrán
USA F9 Futures $10,000	May 1	Vero Beach; United States	Clay	(United States) Ryan Sweeting	(United States) Jonathan Chu (South Africa) Izak van der Merwe
Uzbekistan F3 Futures $15,000	May 1	Namangan; Uzbekistan	Hard	(Kazakhstan) Alexey Kedryuk	(France) Jean-François Bachelot (France) Nicolas Tourte
Italy F12 Futures $10,000	May 1	Piacenza; Italy	Clay	(France) Ludwig Pellerin	(Italy) Daniele Giorgini (France) Ludwig Pellerin
Great Britain F7 Futures $15,000	May 1	Bournemouth; Great Britain	Clay	(Italy) Marco Crugnola	(Italy) Fabio Colangelo (Italy) Marco Crugnola
Spain F13 Futures $10,000	May 1	Vic; Spain	Clay	(Spain) Marc Fornell Mestres	(Spain) Marc Fornell Mestres (Spain) Jordi Marse-Vidri
Greece F1 Futures $10,000	May 1	Kos; Greece	Hard	(Israel) Amit Inbar	(United Kingdom) Neil Bamford (United Kingdom) James May
Italy F13 Futures $10,000	May 8	Vicenza; Italy	Clay	(France) Ludwig Pellerin	(Argentina) Guillermo Carry (Slovenia) Andrej Kračman
Great Britain F8 Futures $15,000	May 8	Edinburgh; Great Britain	Clay	(Germany) Simon Stadler	(Australia) Joseph Sirianni (Germany) Simon Stadler
Spain F14 Futures $10,000	May 8	Lleida; Spain	Clay	(Spain) Daniel Muñoz de la Nava	(Netherlands) Igor Sijsling (Netherlands) Antal van der Duim
Uzbekistan F4 Futures $15,000	May 8	Andijan; Uzbekistan	Hard	(France) Jean-François Bachelot	(Russia) Dmitri Sitak (India) Sunil-Kumar Sipaeya
USA F10 Futures $10,000	May 8	Orange Park; United States	Clay	(United States) Tim Smyczek	(United States) Travis Rettenmaier (United States) Robert Yim
Argentina F6 Futures $10,000	May 8	Santa Fe; Argentina	Clay	(Argentina) Horacio Zeballos	(Argentina) Leandro Migani (Argentina) Horacio Zeballos
Romania F2 Futures $10,000	May 8	Bucharest; Romania	Clay	(Romania) Teodor-Dacian Crăciun	(Romania) Adrian Barbu (Romania) Victor Ioniță
Greece F2 Futures $10,000	May 8	Syros; Greece	Hard	(United Kingdom) Jonathan Marray	(United Kingdom) Josh Goodall (United Kingdom) Richard Irwin
Colombia F4 Futures $15,000	May 8	Barranquilla; Colombia	Clay	(Colombia) Pablo González	(Chile) Jorge Aguilar (Mexico) Daniel Garza
Mexico F6 Futures $10,000	May 8	Celaya; Mexico	Hard	(Mexico) Juan Manuel Elizondo	(Slovenia) Miha Gregorc (Canada) Philip Gubenco
Mexico F7 Futures $10,000	May 15	Guadalajara San Javier; Mexico	Clay	(Moldova) Roman Borvanov	(Canada) Pierre-Ludovic Duclos (Mexico) Bruno Echagaray
Italy F14 Futures $10,000	May 15	Naples; Italy	Clay	(United Kingdom) Morgan Phillips	(Brazil) Marcelo Melo (Portugal) Leonardo Tavares
Bosnia & Herzegovina F1 Futures $10,000	May 15	Sarajevo; Bosnia and Herzegovina	Clay	(Spain) Cesar Ferrer Victoria	(Bosnia and Herzegovina) Ismar Gorčić (Italy) Mattia Livraghi
Spain F15 Futures $10,000	May 15	Balaguer; Spain	Clay	(Spain) Daniel Muñoz de la Nava	(Spain) David Marrero (Spain) Pablo Santos
Romania F3 Futures $10,000	May 15	Bacău; Romania	Clay	(Romania) Teodor-Dacian Crăciun	(Romania) Teodor-Dacian Crăciun (Czech Republic) Dušan Karol
Greece F3 Futures $10,000	May 15	Kalamata; Greece	Hard	(United Kingdom) Jamie Baker	(United Kingdom) Neil Bamford (United Kingdom) James May
Ukraine F1 Futures $10,000	May 15	Illichivsk; Ukraine	Clay	(Ukraine) Alexandr Dolgopolov	(Germany) Bastian Knittel (Germany) Alexander Satschko
Poland F4 Futures $15,000	May 15	Katowice; Poland	Clay	(Czech Republic) Radim Žitko	(Czech Republic) Michal Navrátil (Czech Republic) Radim Žitko
Brazil F1 Futures $15,000	May 15	Recife; Brazil	Clay (i)	(Brazil) Lucas Engel	(Brazil) Rafael Farias (Brazil) Gabriel Pitta
Argentina F7 Futures $10,000	May 15	Buenos Aires; Argentina	Clay	(Argentina) Damián Patriarca	(Argentina) Brian Dabul (Argentina) Cristian Villagrán
USA F11 Futures $10,000	May 15	Tampa; United States	Clay	(United States) Robert Yim	(United States) Kelly Jones (United States) Pete Stroer
Czech Rep. F1 Futures $10,000	May 15	Most; Czech Republic	Clay	(Germany) Daniel Brands	(Czech Republic) Roman Vögeli (Czech Republic) Lukáš Rosol
Kuwait F1 Futures $15,000	May 15	Mishref; Kuwait	Hard	(Switzerland) Marco Chiudinelli	(Germany) Ralph Grambow (Germany) Philipp Marx
Kuwait F2 Futures $15,000	May 22	Mishref; Kuwait	Hard	(Switzerland) Marco Chiudinelli	(Slovakia) Viktor Bruthans (Switzerland) Marco Chiudinelli
Czech Rep. F2 Futures $10,000	May 22	Jablonec nad Nisou; Czech Republic	Clay	(Czech Republic) Michal Tabara	(Czech Republic) Daniel Lustig (Slovakia) Filip Polášek
Argentina F8 Futures $10,000	May 22	Mendoza; Argentina	Clay	(Argentina) Horacio Zeballos	(Chile) Jorge Aguilar (Mexico) Daniel Garza
Brazil F2 Futures $10,000	May 22	Florianópolis; Brazil	Clay	(Brazil) Ricardo Hocevar	(Brazil) Franco Ferreiro (Uruguay) Martín Vilarrubí
India F1 Futures $15,000	May 22	Delhi; India	Hard	(Hong Kong) Karan Rastogi	(Ghana) Henry Adjei-Darko (India) Sunil-Kumar Sipaeya
Italy F15 Futures $15,000	May 22	Parma; Italy	Clay	(Spain) José Antonio Sánchez de Luna	(Spain) José Antonio Sánchez de Luna (Italy) Tomas Tenconi
Bosnia & Herzegovina F2 Futures $10,000	May 22	Brčko; Bosnia and Herzegovina	Clay	(Italy) Alessandro Da Col	(Croatia) Ivan Dodig (North Macedonia) Lazar Magdinčev
Spain F16 Futures $10,000	May 22	Reus; Spain	Clay	(Aruba) Jose Luis Muguruza	(Spain) Carles Poch Gradin (Spain) Carlos Rexach-Itoiz
Romania F4 Futures $10,000	May 22	Bucharest; Romania	Clay	(Romania) Victor Ioniță	(Romania) Adrian Barbu (Romania) Florin Mergea
Poland F5 Futures $10,000	May 22	Bytom; Poland	Clay	(Russia) Denis Matsukevich	(Germany) Gero Kretschmer (Germany) Clinton Thomson
Ukraine F2 Futures $10,000	May 22	Kyiv; Ukraine	Clay	(Slovakia) Pavol Červenák	(Russia) Alexander Kudryavtsev (Russia) Alexandre Krasnoroutskiy
Mexico F8 Futures $10,000	May 22	Los Mochis; Mexico	Clay	(Switzerland) Sven Swinnen	(United States) Michael Johnson (Switzerland) Sven Swinnen
Japan F4 Futures $15,000	May 22	Munakata; Japan	Hard	(Japan) Go Soeda	(United States) Troy Hahn (United States) Michael Yani
Japan F5 Futures $15,000	May 29	Munakata; Japan	Hard	(Germany) Mischa Zverev	(Japan) Hiroyasu Sato (Germany) Mischa Zverev
Tunisia F1 Futures $10,000	May 29	Sousse; Tunisia	Clay	(Czech Republic) Dušan Lojda	(Morocco) Mounir El Aarej (Tunisia) Walid Jallali
Italy F16 Futures $15,000	May 29	Cesena; Italy	Clay	(Romania) Victor Ioniță	(Argentina) Diego Álvarez (Italy) Alessandro Motti
Slovenia F1 Futures $10,000	May 29	Portorož; Slovenia	Hard	(Slovenia) Grega Žemlja	(Italy) Mattia Livraghi (Italy) Matteo Volante
Bosnia & Herzegovina F3 Futures $10,000	May 29	Prijedor; Bosnia and Herzegovina	Clay	(Croatia) Ivan Dodig	(Croatia) Ivan Dodig (Czech Republic) Adam Vejmelka
Spain F17 Futures $10,000	May 29	Maspalomas; Spain	Clay	(Spain) José Checa Calvo	(Spain) Mariano Albert-Ferrando (Spain) Antonio Baldellou-Esteva
Romania F5 Futures $10,000	May 29	Zalău; Romania	Clay	(Romania) Adrian Cruciat	(Romania) Adrian Barbu (Romania) Florin Mergea
Poland F6 Futures $10,000	May 29	Kraków; Poland	Clay	(Finland) Timo Nieminen	(Poland) Maciej Diłaj (Australia) Raphael Durek
Ukraine F3 Futures $10,000	May 29	Cherkasy; Ukraine	Clay	(Ukraine) Alexandr Dolgopolov	(Russia) Alexander Kudryavtsev (Russia) Alexandre Krasnoroutskiy
India F2 Futures $15,000	May 29	Dehradun; India	Hard	(United States) Nicholas Monroe	(India) Vinod Sridhar (India) Vishal Uppal
Brazil F3 Futures $10,000	May 29	Chapecó; Brazil	Clay	(Brazil) Rogério Dutra Silva	(Brazil) Franco Ferreiro (Uruguay) Martín Vilarrubí
Argentina F9 Futures $10,000	May 29	Buenos Aires; Argentina	Clay	(Argentina) Cristian Villagrán	(Argentina) Brian Dabul (Argentina) Cristian Villagrán
Czech Rep. F3 Futures $10,000	May 29	Karlovy Vary; Czech Republic	Clay	(Czech Republic) Ladislav Chramosta	(Czech Republic) Daniel Lustig (Slovakia) Filip Polášek

=== June ===
Tournament	Date	City	Surface	Singles champions	Doubles champions
Thailand F1 Futures $10,000	June 5	Bangkok; Thailand	Hard	(United States) Lester Cook	(Colombia) Rubén Torres (South Africa) Izak van der Merwe
Ukraine F4 Futures $10,000	June 5	Gorlovka; Ukraine	Clay	(Germany) Alexander Satschko	(Russia) Mikhail Elgin (Kazakhstan) Aleksandr Nedovyesov
Norway F1 Futures $10,000	June 5	Gausdal; Norway	Hard	(Norway) Stian Boretti	(Italy) Claudio Grassi (Italy) Riccardo Ghedin
Brazil F4 Futures $10,000	June 5	Piracicaba; Brazil	Clay	(Brazil) Rogério Dutra Silva	(Colombia) Santiago Giraldo (Colombia) Carlos Salamanca
Italy F17 Futures $10,000	June 5	Udine; Italy	Clay	(Italy) Enrico Burzi	(Greece) Konstantinos Oliver Kalaitzis (United Kingdom) Alexander Slabinsky
Slovenia F2 Futures $10,000	June 5	Maribor; Slovenia	Clay	(Slovenia) Marko Tkalec	(Spain) Jordi Marse-Vidri (Spain) Pablo Santos
Spain F18 Futures $15,000	June 5	Tenerife; Spain	Carpet	(France) Jean-François Bachelot	(France) Jean-François Bachelot (France) Nicolas Tourte
Romania F6 Futures $10,000	June 5	Pitești; Romania	Clay	(Romania) Gabriel Moraru	(Romania) Adrian Barbu (Romania) Florin Mergea
Poland F7 Futures $15,000	June 5	Koszalin; Poland	Clay	(France) Jordane Doble	(Poland) Maciej Diłaj (Australia) Raphael Durek
Tunisia F2 Futures $10,000	June 5	Hammamet; Tunisia	Clay	(France) Augustin Gensse	(Morocco) Rabie Chaki (Greece) Alexandros Jakupovic
Tunisia F3 Futures $10,000	June 12	Djerba; Tunisia	Clay	(France) David Guez	(Morocco) Ali El Alaoui (Morocco) Rabie Chaki
Japan F6 Futures $10,000	June 12	Karuizawa; Japan	Clay	(Japan) Satoshi Iwabuchi	(Japan) Satoshi Iwabuchi (Japan) Yaoki Ishii
Italy F18 Futures $10,000	June 12	Bassano; Italy	Clay	(Italy) Daniele Giorgini	(Italy) Fabio Colangelo (Italy) Stefano Ianni
Slovenia F3 Futures $10,000	June 12	Koper; Slovenia	Clay	(Slovenia) Marko Tkalec	(Croatia) Ivan Cerović (Serbia) Darko Mađarovski
Netherlands F1 Futures $10,000	June 12	Meppel; Netherlands	Clay	(Netherlands) Boy Westerhof	(Netherlands) Floris Kilian (Netherlands) Boy Westerhof
Belarus F1 Futures $15,000	June 12	Minsk; Belarus	Clay	(Ukraine) Alexandr Dolgopolov	(Ukraine) Alexandr Dolgopolov (Belarus) Serguei Tarasevitch
Spain F19 Futures $10,000	June 12	La Palma; Spain	Hard	(France) Nicolas Tourte	(France) Jean-François Bachelot (France) Nicolas Tourte
Romania F7 Futures $10,000	June 12	Brașov; Romania	Clay	(Spain) Carles Poch Gradin	(Italy) Luca Bonati (Spain) Carles Poch Gradin
Turkey F1 Futures $10,000	June 12	Ankara; Turkey	Clay	(Romania) Teodor-Dacian Crăciun	(Germany) Alexander Satschko (Brazil) Márcio Torres
Brazil F5 Futures $10,000	June 12	Sorocaba; Brazil	Clay	(Brazil) Rogério Dutra Silva	(Brazil) Franco Ferreiro (Brazil) Rogério Dutra Silva
Norway F2 Futures $10,000	June 12	Gausdal; Norway	Hard	(Monaco) Thomas Oger	(Israel) Ishay Hadash (Israel) Victor Kolik
Macedonia F2 Futures $10,000	June 12	Skopje; Macedonia	Clay	(Bulgaria) Ivaylo Traykov	(North Macedonia) Lazar Magdinčev (North Macedonia) Predrag Rusevski
USA F12 Futures $15,000	June 12	Rocklin; United States	Hard	(United States) Brendan Evans	(South Africa) Kevin Anderson (United States) Scott Oudsema
Poland F8 Futures $10,000	June 12	Gdynia; Poland	Clay	(France) Jordane Doble	(Poland) Dawid Olejniczak (Poland) Filip Urban
Thailand F2 Futures $10,000	June 12	Bangkok; Thailand	Hard	(Japan) Takahiro Terachi	(China) Yu Xinyuan (China) Zeng Shaoxuan
Thailand F3 Futures $10,000	June 19	Bangkok; Thailand	Hard	(Japan) Takahiro Terachi	(India) Vijay Kannan (India) Ashutosh Singh
USA F13 Futures $15,000	June 19	Woodland; United States	Hard	(United States) Michael Yani	(South Africa) Kevin Anderson (United States) David Martin
Ireland F1 Futures $15,000	June 19	Limerick; Ireland	Carpet	(Denmark) Frederik Nielsen	(Denmark) Frederik Nielsen (Denmark) Rasmus Nørby
Netherlands F2 Futures $10,000	June 19	Alkmaar; Netherlands	Clay	(Netherlands) Nick van der Meer	(Belgium) Dominique Coene (France) Jonathan Dasnières de Veigy
France F8 Futures $15,000	June 19	Blois; France	Clay	(France) Alexandre Sidorenko	(France) David Guez (France) Julien Jeanpierre
Belarus F2 Futures $15,000	June 19	Minsk; Belarus	Hard	(Spain) Cesar Ferrer Victoria	(Russia) Alexander Kudryavtsev (Russia) Alexandre Krasnoroutskiy
Spain F20 Futures $15,000	June 19	Santa Cruz de Tenerife; Spain	Hard	(France) Adrian Mannarino	(Germany) Tony Holzinger (Togo) Komlavi Loglo
Romania F8 Futures $10,000	June 19	Bucharest; Romania	Clay	(Romania) Victor Ioniță	(Romania) Adrian Gavrilă (Romania) Andrei Mlendea
Finland F1 Futures $10,000	June 19	Vierumäki; Finland	Clay	(Norway) Stian Boretti	(Estonia) Mait Künnap (Spain) Jordi Marse-Vidri
Turkey F2 Futures $10,000	June 19	Istanbul; Turkey	Hard	(Germany) Alexander Satschko	(Israel) Ishay Hadash (Israel) Victor Kolik
Brazil F6 Futures $10,000	June 19	Sorocaba; Brazil	Clay	(Colombia) Santiago Giraldo	(Brazil) Alexandre Bonatto (Brazil) Franco Ferreiro
Tunisia F3A Futures $10,000	June 19	Carthage; Tunisia	Clay	(Morocco) Rabie Chaki	(Tunisia) Haythem Abid (Tunisia) Hakim Rezgui
Serbia & Montenegro F1 Futures $10,000	June 19	Belgrade; Serbia & Montenegro	Clay	(Bulgaria) Ivaylo Traykov	(Croatia) Ivan Dodig (North Macedonia) Predrag Rusevski
Italy F19 Futures $15,000	June 19	L'Aquila; Italy	Clay	(Slovakia) Kamil Čapkovič	(Italy) Fabio Colangelo (Italy) Daniele Giorgini
Japan F7 Futures $10,000	June 19	Kusatsu; Japan	Carpet	(Japan) Satoshi Iwabuchi	(Japan) Yaoki Ishii (Japan) Joji Miyao
Japan F8 Futures $10,000	June 26	Tokyo; Japan	Hard	(China) Yu Xinyuan	(China) Yu Xinyuan (China) Zeng Shaoxuan
USA F15 Futures $10,000	June 26	Buffalo; United States	Clay	(Dominican Republic) Víctor Estrella Burgos	(United States) Jonathan Chu (United States) Alex Clayton
Turkey F3 Futures $10,000	June 26	Yesilyurt; Turkey	Hard	(Kazakhstan) Alexey Kedryuk	(Uzbekistan) Murad Inoyatov (Kazakhstan) Alexey Kedryuk
Serbia & Montenegro F2 Futures $10,000	June 26	Belgrade; Serbia & Montenegro	Clay	(North Macedonia) Predrag Rusevski	(Serbia) Darko Mađarovski (Serbia) Aleksander Slovic
Italy F20 Futures $10,000	June 26	Castelfranco; Italy	Clay	(Italy) Massimo Ocera	(Italy) Alberto Giraudo (Italy) Stefano Ianni
Netherlands F3 Futures $10,000	June 26	Heerhugowaard; Netherlands	Clay	(Netherlands) Igor Sijsling	(Belgium) Dominique Coene (Netherlands) Robin Haase
France F9 Futures $15,000	June 26	Toulon; France	Clay	(Argentina) Horacio Zeballos	(Spain) Carles Poch Gradin (Spain) Carlos Rexach-Itoiz
Austria F4 Futures $10,000	June 26	Anif; Austria	Clay	(Germany) Tobias Kamke	(Germany) Bastian Knittel (Austria) Stefan Wiespeiner
Germany F6 Futures $10,000	June 26	Römerberg; Germany	Clay	(Germany) Lars Pörschke	(Czech Republic) Jakub Hasek (Czech Republic) David Novak
Romania F9 Futures $10,000	June 26	Iași; Romania	Clay	(Georgia (country)) Lado Chikhladze	(Romania) Adrian Cruciat (Romania) Adrian Gavrilă
Ireland F2 Futures $15,000	June 26	Dublin; Ireland	Carpet	(Germany) Mischa Zverev	(France) Jean-François Bachelot (France) Nicolas Tourte
USA F14 Futures $15,000	June 26	Chico; United States	Hard	(Mexico) Bruno Echagaray	(Mexico) Bruno Echagaray (Mexico) Daniel Garza
Iran F1 Futures $15,000	June 26	Tehran; Iran	Clay	(Austria) Daniel Köllerer	(Austria) Daniel Köllerer (Germany) Alexander Satschko

=== July ===
Tournament	Date	City	Surface	Singles champions	Doubles champions
Iran F2 Futures $15,000	July 3	Tehran; Iran	Clay	(Germany) Alexander Satschko	(Austria) Daniel Köllerer (Germany) Alexander Satschko
Venezuela F1B Futures $15,000	July 3	Caracas; Venezuela	Hard	(Slovenia) Luka Gregorc	(Argentina) Juan-Pablo Amado (Argentina) Diego Cristin
USA F16 Futures $10,000	July 3	Pittsburgh; United States	Clay	(Dominican Republic) Víctor Estrella Burgos	(Australia) Shannon Nettle (Australia) Daniel Wendler
Turkey F4 Futures $10,000	July 3	Istanbul; Turkey	Hard	(Kazakhstan) Alexey Kedryuk	(Israel) Dekel Valtzer (Israel) Amir Weintraub
Italy F21 Futures $15,000	July 3	Bologna; Italy	Clay	(Slovakia) Pavol Červenák	(Croatia) Ivan Cerović (Czech Republic) Adam Vejmelka
Austria F5 Futures $10,000	July 3	Telfs; Austria	Clay	(Austria) Andreas Haider-Maurer	(Austria) Martin Fischer (Austria) Philipp Oswald
Germany F7 Futures $15,000	July 3	Kassel; Germany	Clay	(Slovakia) Lukáš Lacko	(Germany) Gero Kretschmer (Germany) Clinton Thomson
Spain F21 Futures $15,000	July 3	Alicante; Spain	Clay	(Germany) Tony Holzinger	(Germany) Tony Holzinger (Spain) Juan-Miguel Such-Perez
Romania F10 Futures $10,000	July 3	Focșani; Romania	Clay	(South Africa) Fritz Wolmarans	(Romania) Teodor-Dacian Crăciun (Romania) Victor Ioniță
Italy F22 Futures $10,000	July 10	Carpi; Italy	Clay	(Slovakia) Pavol Červenák	(Italy) Mattia Livraghi (Italy) Matteo Volante
France F10 Futures $15,000	July 10	Bourg-en-Bresse; France	Clay	(Germany) Maximilian Abel	(France) Jonathan Eysseric (France) Boris Obama
Austria F6 Futures $10,000	July 10	Kramsach; Austria	Clay	(Austria) Thomas Schiessling	(Austria) Martin Fischer (Austria) Philipp Oswald
Great Britain F9 Futures $15,000	July 10	Felixstowe; Great Britain	Grass	(United Kingdom) Josh Goodall	(Australia) Luke Bourgeois (United Kingdom) Lee Childs
Spain F22 Futures $15,000	July 10	Elche; Spain	Clay	(Spain) Javier Genaro-Martinez	(Spain) Marc Fornell Mestres (Spain) Miguel Ángel López Jaén
Germany F8 Futures $10,000	July 10	Trier; Germany	Clay	(Belgium) Niels Desein	(Germany) Dustin Brown (Germany) Daniel Puttkammer
Romania F11 Futures $10,000	July 10	Târgu Mureş; Romania	Clay	(Romania) Victor Crivoi	(Romania) Adrian Cruciat (Romania) Victor Ioniță
USA F17 Futures $10,000	July 10	Peoria; United States	Clay	(United States) Denis Zivkovic	(Australia) Shannon Nettle (Australia) Daniel Wendler
Venezuela F1C Futures $15,000	July 10	Caracas; Venezuela	Hard	(Mexico) Daniel Garza	(Argentina) Alejandro Kon (Argentina) Damian Listingart
USA F18 Futures $10,000	July 17	Joplin; United States	Hard	(Australia) Shannon Nettle	(United States) Joel Kielbowicz (United States) Ryan Stotland
Italy F23 Futures $10,000	July 17	Palazzolo sull'Oglio; Italy	Clay	(Italy) Marco Pedrini	(Russia) Sergei Demekhine (Italy) Luca Vanni
France F11 Futures $15,000	July 17	Saint-Gervais; France	Clay	(Argentina) Horacio Zeballos	(France) Patrice Atias (France) Jonathan Eysseric
Great Britain F10 Futures $15,000	July 17	Frinton-on-Sea; Great Britain	Grass	(New Zealand) Daniel King-Turner	(United Kingdom) Andrew Kennaugh (United Kingdom) Tom Rushby
Germany F9 Futures $10,000	July 17	Espelkamp; Germany	Clay	(Germany) Franz Stauder	(Germany) Hendrik Dreekmann (Germany) Franz Stauder
Spain F23 Futures $10,000	July 17	Gandia; Spain	Clay	(France) Augustin Gensse	(France) Augustin Gensse (Spain) Carlos Rexach-Itoiz
Romania F12 Futures $10,000	July 17	Bucharest; Romania	Clay	(Croatia) Vjekoslav Skenderovic	(Romania) Adrian Cruciat (Romania) Adrian Gavrilă
Belgium F1 Futures $15,000	July 17	Waterloo; Belgium	Clay	(Slovakia) Pavol Červenák	(United States) Nikita Kryvonos (Czech Republic) Lukáš Rosol
Mexico F9 Futures $10,000	July 17	Mexico City; Mexico	Hard	(Cuba) Lázaro Navarro	(United States) Michael Johnson (Cuba) Lázaro Navarro
Mexico F10 Futures $10,000	July 24	Comitán; Mexico	Hard	(Cuba) Lázaro Navarro	(United States) Darrin Cohen (United States) Brett Ross
Italy F24 Futures $10,000	July 24	Modena; Italy	Clay	(Ukraine) Alexandr Dolgopolov	(Italy) Matteo Fago (Italy) Stefano Pescosolido
USA F19 Futures $10,000	July 24	Godfrey; United States	Hard	(United States) Ryler DeHeart	(United States) Ryler DeHeart (South Africa) Stephen Mitchell
Austria F7 Futures $10,000	July 24	St. Pölten; Austria	Clay	(Serbia) Nikola Ćirić	(Slovakia) Martin Hromec (Slovakia) Matus Horecny
Spain F24 Futures $10,000	July 24	Dénia; Spain	Clay	(Spain) Marc Fornell Mestres	(Spain) Marc Fornell Mestres (Spain) Miguel Ángel López Jaén
Romania F13 Futures $10,000	July 24	Hunedoara; Romania	Clay	(Hungary) Kornél Bardóczky	(Romania) Cosmin Cotet (Romania) Marcel-Ioan Miron
Belgium F2 Futures $15,000	July 24	Sint-Katelijne-Waver; Belgium	Clay	(Netherlands) Igor Sijsling	(United States) Nikita Kryvonos (Czech Republic) Lukáš Rosol
Germany F9A Futures $10,000	July 24	Wetzlar; Germany	Clay	(Germany) Sebastian Fitz	(Romania) Artemon Apostu-Efremov (Luxembourg) Laurent Bram
Austria F8 Futures $10,000	July 31	Pörtschach; Austria	Clay	(Austria) Martin Fischer	(Austria) Martin Fischer (Austria) Philipp Oswald
Italy F25 Futures $10,000	July 31	Imperia; Italy	Clay	(Italy) Matteo Viola	(Italy) Fabio Colangelo (Italy) Mattia Livraghi
Latvia F1 Futures $10,000	July 31	Jūrmala; Latvia	Clay	(Latvia) Andis Juška	(Estonia) Mait Künnap (Latvia) Deniss Pavlovs
Great Britain F11 Futures $15,000	July 31	Ilkley; Great Britain	Grass	(France) Julien Maes	(United Kingdom) James May (United Kingdom) Jonathan Marray
Serbia & Montenegro F3 Futures $10,000	July 31	Sombor; Serbia & Montenegro	Clay	(Serbia) Darko Mađarovski	(Serbia) Darko Mađarovski (Serbia) Aleksander Slovic
Germany F10 Futures $15,000	July 31	Ingolstadt; Germany	Clay	(Australia) Joseph Sirianni	(Germany) Tobias Kamke (Germany) Julian Reister
Spain F25 Futures $10,000	July 31	Xàtiva; Spain	Clay	(Portugal) Gonçalo Nicau	(Brazil) Lucas Jovita (Spain) Javier Ruiz-Gonzalez
Romania F14 Futures $10,000	July 31	Balș; Romania	Clay	(Romania) Andrei Mlendea	(Romania) Cosmin Cotet (Romania) Marcel-Ioan Miron
Argentina F10 Futures $10,000	July 31	Santa Fe; Argentina	Clay	(Argentina) Martín Alund	(Argentina) Nicolas Jara-Lozano (Argentina) Andrés Molteni
Hungary F1 Futures $10,000	July 31	Hódmezővásárhely; Hungary	Clay	(Hungary) Sebő Kiss	(Hungary) György Balázs (Hungary) Sebő Kiss
USA F20 Futures $10,000	July 31	Decatur; United States	Hard	(South Africa) Fritz Wolmarans	(Australia) Carsten Ball (Australia) Adam Feeney
Senegal F1 Futures $10,000	July 31	Dakar; Senegal	Hard	(Togo) Komlavi Loglo	(Israel) Amit Inbar (Israel) Amir Weintraub
Venezuela F1 Futures $10,000	July 31	Caracas; Venezuela	Clay	(Ecuador) Julio César Campozano	(Venezuela) Roberto Maytín (Venezuela) Oscar Posada
Mexico F11 Futures $10,000	July 31	Tuxtla Gutiérrez; Mexico	Hard	(Mexico) Miguel Gallardo Valles	(Mexico) Bruno Rodríguez (Mexico) Miguel Ángel Reyes-Varela
Indonesia F1 Futures $10,000	July 31	Jakarta; Indonesia	Hard	(Japan) Takahiro Terachi	(South Korea) Kim Dong-hyun (South Korea) Kwon Oh-hee

=== August ===
Tournament	Date	City	Surface	Singles champions	Doubles champions
Indonesia F2 Futures $10,000	August 7	Jakarta; Indonesia	Hard	(Japan) Yaoki Ishii	(Chinese Taipei) Lee Hsin-han (Hong Kong) Yu Hiu Tung
Venezuela F2 Futures $10,000	August 7	Caracas; Venezuela	Hard	(Venezuela) Yohny Romero	(Venezuela) Piero Luisi (Venezuela) Roberto Maytín
Senegal F2 Futures $10,000	August 7	Dakar; Senegal	Hard	(Israel) Amir Weintraub	(Israel) Amit Inbar (Israel) Amir Weintraub
Thailand F4 Futures $15,000	August 7	Bangkok; Thailand	Hard	(South Korea) Chung Hee-seok	(China) Yu Xinyuan (China) Zeng Shaoxuan
USA F21 Futures $10,000	August 7	Kenosha; United States	Hard	(Australia) Adam Feeney	(South Africa) Stephen Mitchell (South Africa) Izak van der Merwe
Slovak Rep. F1 Futures $10,000	August 7	Žilina; Slovakia	Clay	(Czech Republic) Karel Triska	(Czech Republic) Daniel Lustig (Slovakia) Filip Polášek
Argentina F11 Futures $10,000	August 7	Córdoba; Argentina	Clay	(Argentina) Eduardo Schwank	(Argentina) Leandro Migani (Argentina) Sebastian Uriarte
Italy F26 Futures $10,000	August 7	Avezzano; Italy	Clay	(Italy) Luca Vanni	(Italy) Tommaso Cafferata (Italy) Stefano Rodighiero
Lithuania F1 Futures $10,000	August 7	Vilnius; Lithuania	Clay	(Czech Republic) Adam Vejmelka	(Poland) Tomasz Bednarek (Latvia) Deniss Pavlovs
Austria F9 Futures $10,000	August 7	Pörtschach; Austria	Clay	(Slovenia) Marko Tkalec	(Czech Republic) David Novak (Czech Republic) Martin Vacek
Great Britain F12 Futures $15,000	August 7	Wrexham; Great Britain	Hard	(Republic of Ireland) Conor Niland	(United Kingdom) Andrew Kennaugh (United Kingdom) Tom Rushby
Serbia & Montenegro F4 Futures $10,000	August 7	Novi Sad; Serbia & Montenegro	Clay	(Serbia) Dejan Katic	(Serbia) Darko Mađarovski (Serbia) Aleksander Slovic
Germany F11 Futures $10,000	August 7	Essen; Germany	Clay	(Germany) Tobias Kamke	(Belgium) Ruben Bemelmans (Belgium) Niels Desein
Romania F15 Futures $10,000	August 7	Craiova; Romania	Clay	(Kazakhstan) Aleksandr Nedovyesov	(Ukraine) Denys Molchanov (Kazakhstan) Aleksandr Nedovyesov
Italy F27 Futures $15,000	August 14	Bolzano; Italy	Clay	(Italy) Giancarlo Petrazzuolo	(Czech Republic) Dušan Karol (Spain) David Luque-Velasco
Croatia F3 Futures $10,000	August 14	Vinkovci; Croatia	Clay	(North Macedonia) Predrag Rusevski	(Croatia) Ivan Dodig (Croatia) Davor Kuseta
Lithuania F2 Futures $10,000	August 14	Vilnius; Lithuania	Clay	(Italy) Stefano Ianni	(Italy) Marco Gualdi (Italy) Matteo Volante
Serbia & Montenegro F5 Futures $10,000	August 14	Zaječar; Serbia & Montenegro	Clay	(Serbia) Nikola Ćirić	(Serbia) Darko Mađarovski (Serbia) Aleksander Slovic
Germany F12 Futures $15,000	August 14	Wahlstedt; Germany	Clay	(France) Alexandre Renard	(Sweden) Karl Norberg (Germany) Julian Reister
Romania F16 Futures $10,000	August 14	Arad; Romania	Clay	(Romania) Victor Ioniță	(Ukraine) Denys Molchanov (Kazakhstan) Aleksandr Nedovyesov
Spain F26 Futures $15,000	August 14	Irun; Spain	Clay	(Spain) Marc Fornell Mestres	(Portugal) Gonçalo Nicau (Argentina) Horacio Zeballos
Poland F9 Futures $10,000	August 14	Wrocław; Poland	Clay	(Czech Republic) David Novak	(Czech Republic) David Novak (Czech Republic) Martin Vacek
Argentina F12 Futures $10,000	August 14	Mendoza; Argentina	Clay	(Argentina) Eduardo Schwank	(Argentina) Demian Gschwend (Argentina) Eduardo Schwank
Slovak Rep. F2 Futures $10,000	August 14	Piešťany; Slovakia	Clay	(Czech Republic) David Škoch	(Czech Republic) Daniel Lustig (Slovakia) Filip Polášek
Brazil F7 Futures $10,000	August 14	Florianópolis; Brazil	Clay	(Brazil) Franco Ferreiro	(Brazil) Alexandre Bonatto (Brazil) Franco Ferreiro
Thailand F5 Futures $15,000	August 14	Nonthaburi; Thailand	Hard	(South Korea) Chung Hee-seok	(China) Yu Xinyuan (China) Zeng Shaoxuan
Venezuela F3 Futures $10,000	August 14	Valencia; Venezuela	Hard	(Mexico) Miguel Gallardo Valles	(Mexico) Miguel Gallardo Valles (Mexico) Carlos Palencia
Indonesia F3 Futures $10,000	August 14	Manado; Indonesia	Hard	(Indonesia) Suwandi	(Indonesia) Elbert Sie (Indonesia) Bonit Wiryawan
Ecuador F1 Futures $10,000	August 21	Guayaquil; Ecuador	Hard	(Peru) Iván Miranda	(Argentina) Juan-Pablo Amado (Argentina) Brian Dabul
Brazil F8 Futures $10,000	August 21	Florianópolis; Brazil	Clay	(Brazil) Franco Ferreiro	(Brazil) Thomaz Bellucci (Brazil) Daniel Dutra da Silva
Iran F3 Futures $15,000	August 21	Tehran; Iran	Clay	(Germany) Bastian Knittel	(Iran) Anoosha Shahgholi (Iran) Ashkan Shokoofi
Italy F28 Futures $10,000	August 21	Padua; Italy	Clay	(Italy) Giancarlo Petrazzuolo	(Czech Republic) Dušan Karol (Italy) Matteo Volante
Croatia F4 Futures $10,000	August 21	Čakovec; Croatia	Clay	(Slovenia) Blaž Kavčič	(Croatia) Ivan Cerović (Croatia) Ivan Dodig
Bulgaria F1 Futures $10,000	August 21	Plovdiv; Bulgaria	Clay	(Bulgaria) Todor Enev	(Bulgaria) Ilia Kushev (Bulgaria) Yordan Kanev
Netherlands F4 Futures $15,000	August 21	Vlaardingen; Netherlands	Clay	(Australia) Joseph Sirianni	(Netherlands) Michel Koning (Netherlands Antilles) Martijn van Haasteren
Germany F13 Futures $10,000	August 21	Unterföhring; Germany	Clay	(Czech Republic) Martin Vacek	(Italy) Luca Bonati (Italy) Mattia Livraghi
Romania F17 Futures $10,000	August 21	Bucharest; Romania	Clay	(Romania) Victor Ioniță	(Sweden) Paul Ciorascu (Romania) Alexandru-Raul Lazar
Finland F2 Futures $10,000	August 21	Helsinki; Finland	Hard	(France) Gary Lugassy	(Denmark) Frederik Nielsen (Finland) Juho Paukku
Poland F10 Futures $15,000	August 21	Poznań; Poland	Clay	(Czech Republic) Jan Minář	(Russia) Alexander Kudryavtsev (Russia) Alexandre Krasnoroutskiy
Mexico F13 Futures $15,000	August 21	Monterrey; Mexico	Clay	(Chile) Jorge Aguilar	(Mexico) Miguel Gallardo Valles (Mexico) Carlos Palencia
Italy F29 Futures $10,000	August 28	Piombino; Italy	Hard	(Denmark) Frederik Nielsen	(Monaco) Thomas Oger (France) Nicolas Tourte
Croatia F5 Futures $10,000	August 28	Mali Lošinj; Croatia	Clay	(Slovenia) Marko Tkalec	(Croatia) Nikola Martinovic (Croatia) Joško Topić
Netherlands F5 Futures $15,000	August 28	Alphen aan den Rijn; Netherlands	Clay	(Germany) Gero Kretschmer	(Austria) Daniel Köllerer (Serbia) Petar Popović
Bulgaria F2 Futures $10,000	August 28	Sofia; Bulgaria	Clay	(Serbia) Nikola Ćirić	(Serbia) David Savić (Montenegro) Goran Tošić
Switzerland F4 Futures $10,000	August 28	Crissier; Switzerland	Clay	(Czech Republic) Martin Vacek	(Czech Republic) Roman Vögeli (Czech Republic) Martin Vacek
Germany F14 Futures $10,000	August 28	Herpersdorf; Germany	Clay	(Austria) Thomas Schiessling	(Italy) Luca Bonati (Luxembourg) Laurent Bram
Romania F18 Futures $10,000	August 28	Timișoara; Romania	Clay	(Romania) Teodor-Dacian Crăciun	(Italy) Paolo Beninca (Romania) Thomas-Cristian Hodel
Spain F28 Futures $15,000	August 28	Oviedo; Spain	Clay	(Spain) Javier Genaro-Martinez	(Spain) Marc Fornell Mestres (Spain) Juan-Miguel Such-Perez
Poland F11 Futures $10,000	August 28	Szczecin; Poland	Clay	(Spain) Guillem Burniol	(Poland) Maciej Diłaj (Australia) Raphael Durek
Iran F4 Futures $15,000	August 28	Tehran; Iran	Clay	(Czech Republic) Adam Vejmelka	(Slovakia) Filip Polášek (Germany) Alexander Satschko
Brazil F9 Futures $10,000	August 28	Itajaí; Brazil	Clay	(Brazil) Lucas Engel	(Brazil) Marcelo Melo (Brazil) André Miele
Mexico F14 Futures $15,000	August 28	Monterrey; Mexico	Hard	(United States) Lester Cook	(United States) Lester Cook (United States) Shane La Porte
Ecuador F2 Futures $10,000	August 28	Guayaquil; Ecuador	Hard	(Argentina) Brian Dabul	(Argentina) Juan-Pablo Amado (Argentina) Brian Dabul
Australia F6 Futures $15,000	August 28	Mackay; Australia	Hard	(Australia) Nick Lindahl	(Australia) Carsten Ball (Australia) Adam Feeney

=== September ===
Tournament	Date	City	Surface	Singles champions	Doubles champions
Australia F7 Futures $15,000	September 4	Rockhampton; Australia	Hard	(Canada) Rob Steckley	(Australia) Sadik Kadir (Australia) Robert Smeets
Ecuador F3 Futures $10,000	September 4	Guayaquil; Ecuador	Clay	(Argentina) Brian Dabul	(Peru) Iván Miranda (Peru) Matías Silva
Brazil F10 Futures $10,000	September 4	Fortaleza; Brazil	Clay	(Brazil) Ricardo Hocevar	(Brazil) Gabriel Pitta (Brazil) Henrique Pinto-Silva
Croatia F6 Futures $10,000	September 4	Zagreb; Croatia	Clay	(Slovenia) Blaž Kavčič	(Croatia) Luka Kukulic (Croatia) Joško Topić
Netherlands F6 Futures $15,000	September 4	Enschede; Netherlands	Clay	(Netherlands) Matwé Middelkoop	(Netherlands) Michel Koning (Chile) Felipe Parada
Bulgaria F3 Futures $10,000	September 4	Sofia; Bulgaria	Clay	(Serbia) Nikola Ćirić	(Bulgaria) Ilia Kushev (Bulgaria) Yordan Kanev
France F12 Futures $15,000	September 4	Bagnères-de-Bigorre; France	Hard	(France) Alexandre Sidorenko	(Monaco) Thomas Oger (France) Nicolas Tourte
Switzerland F5 Futures $10,000	September 4	Pully; Switzerland	Clay	(France) Alexandre Renard	(Italy) Matteo Galli (Italy) Marco Gualdi
Germany F15 Futures $15,000	September 4	Kempten; Germany	Clay	(Germany) Tobias Summerer	(Austria) Martin Fischer (Austria) Philipp Oswald
Poland F12 Futures $15,000	September 4	Gliwice; Poland	Clay	(Slovakia) Kamil Čapkovič	(Russia) Denis Matsukevich (Latvia) Deniss Pavlovs
Italy F31 Futures $15,000	September 11	Porto Torres; Italy	Hard	(United States) Brian Wilson	(United States) Jamie Cerretani (United States) Brian Wilson
Netherlands F7 Futures $10,000	September 11	Almere; Netherlands	Clay	(Netherlands) Jesse Huta Galung	(Netherlands) Thiemo de Bakker (Netherlands) Antal van der Duim
Sweden F4 Futures $10,000	September 11	Gothenburg; Sweden	Hard (i)	(Sweden) Joachim Johansson	(Sweden) Rickard Holmstrom (Sweden) Christian Johansson
Switzerland F6 Futures $10,000	September 11	Geneva; Switzerland	Clay	(France) Alexandre Renard	(Italy) Marco Gualdi (Czech Republic) Martin Vacek
Germany F16 Futures $10,000	September 11	Friedberg; Germany	Clay	(Germany) Marcel Zimmermann	(Germany) David Klier (Germany) Daniel Müller
Spain F29 Futures $15,000	September 11	Móstoles; Spain	Hard	(Australia) Paul Baccanello	(Togo) Komlavi Loglo (Spain) Carlos Rexach-Itoiz
France F13 Futures $15,000	September 11	Mulhouse; France	Hard (i)	(France) Nicolas Tourte	(Monaco) Thomas Oger (France) Nicolas Tourte
Sudan F1 Futures $10,000	September 11	Khartoum; Sudan	Clay	(Czech Republic) Adam Vejmelka	(Romania) Bogdan Leonte (Romania) Marcel-Ioan Miron
Brazil F11 Futures $15,000	September 11	Goiânia; Brazil	Clay	(Brazil) Eduardo Portal	(Argentina) Alejandro Fabbri (Brazil) Márcio Torres
Japan F9 Futures $15,000	September 11	Osaka; Japan	Carpet	(Japan) Yūichi Sugita	(Japan) Yaoki Ishii (Japan) Hiroki Kondo
Australia F8 Futures $15,000	September 11	Hope Island; Australia	Hard	(Australia) Alun Jones	(Australia) Alun Jones (Australia) Robert Smeets
Bolivia F1 Futures $10,000	September 11	La Paz; Bolivia	Clay	(Argentina) Eduardo Schwank	(Argentina) Demian Gschwend (Argentina) Eduardo Schwank
USA F22 Futures $10,000	September 11	Claremont; United States	Hard	(Israel) Dudi Sela	(United States) Ryler DeHeart (United States) Denis Zivkovic
USA F23 Futures $10,000	September 18	Costa Mesa; United States	Hard	(Israel) Dudi Sela	(United States) Joel Kielbowicz (United States) Ryan Stotland
Bolivia F2 Futures $10,000	September 18	Cochabamba; Bolivia	Clay	(Argentina) Eduardo Schwank	(Colombia) Juan Sebastián Cabal (Argentina) Alejandro Kon
Japan F10 Futures $15,000	September 18	Sapporo; Japan	Carpet	(United States) James Pade	(Chinese Taipei) Lee Hsin-han (Chinese Taipei) Yi Chu-huan
Rwanda F1 Futures $10,000	September 18	Kigali; Rwanda	Clay	(Czech Republic) Adam Vejmelka	(Romania) Bogdan Leonte (Romania) Marcel-Ioan Miron
France F14 Futures $15,000	September 18	Plaisir; France	Hard (i)	(France) Grégory Carraz	(France) Loic Le Panse (France) Pierrick Ysern
Spain F30 Futures $15,000	September 18	Madrid; Spain	Hard	(Spain) Carlos Rexach-Itoiz	(Togo) Komlavi Loglo (Spain) Carles Poch Gradin
Great Britain F13 Futures $15,000	September 18	Nottingham; Great Britain	Hard	(Austria) Martin Fischer	(United Kingdom) Neil Bamford (United Kingdom) James May
Sweden F5 Futures $10,000	September 18	Gothenburg; Sweden	Hard (i)	(Sweden) Ervin Eleskovic	(Sweden) Rickard Holmstrom (Sweden) Christian Johansson
Brazil F12 Futures $15,000	September 18	Caldas Novas; Brazil	Hard	(Italy) Francesco Piccari	(Argentina) Sebastián Decoud (Argentina) Leonardo Mayer
Italy F33 Futures $10,000	September 25	Olbia; Italy	Clay	(Italy) Daniele Giorgini	(Italy) Fabio Colangelo (Italy) Giancarlo Petrazzuolo
Mexico F15 Futures $10,000	September 25	Los Mochis; Mexico	Clay	(Switzerland) Sven Swinnen	(Italy) Luca Rovetta (Italy) Matteo Volante
Sweden F6 Futures $10,000	September 25	Falun; Sweden	Hard (i)	(Sweden) Marcus Sarstrand	(Sweden) Johan Brunström (Sweden) Marcus Sarstrand
Great Britain F14 Futures $15,000	September 25	Nottingham; Great Britain	Hard	(United Kingdom) Jamie Baker	(United Kingdom) Neil Bamford (United Kingdom) James May
Spain F31 Futures $15,000	September 25	Martos; Spain	Hard	(Croatia) Tomislav Perić	(Spain) David Canudas-Fernandez (Spain) Carlos Rexach-Itoiz
France F15 Futures $10,000	September 25	Sarreguemines; France	Carpet (i)	(Germany) Clinton Thomson	(Germany) Daniel Müller (Germany) Daniel Stoehr
Uganda F1 Futures $10,000	September 25	Kampala; Uganda	Clay	(Czech Republic) Adam Vejmelka	(Russia) Andemir Karanashev (Russia) Timur Lomtatidze
Bolivia F3 Futures $10,000	September 25	Santa Cruz; Bolivia	Clay	(Argentina) Diego Cristin	(Argentina) Martín Alund (Argentina) Juan-Francisco Spina
Australia F9 Futures $15,000	September 25	Happy Valley; Australia	Hard	(Australia) Adam Feeney	(Australia) Adam Feeney (Australia) Dane Fernandez
USA F24 Futures $10,000	September 25	Irvine; United States	Hard	(Netherlands) Fred Hemmes	(Australia) Adam Kennedy (Australia) Robert Smeets
Venezuela F4 Futures $10,000	September 25	Pampatar; Venezuela	Clay	(Ecuador) Carlos Avellán	(Ecuador) Carlos Avellán (Ecuador) Julio César Campozano

=== October ===
Tournament	Date	City	Surface	Singles champions	Doubles champions
Italy F34 Futures $10,000	October 2	Sassari; Italy	Clay	(Italy) Leonardo Azzaro	(Italy) Fabio Colangelo (Italy) Daniele Giorgini
France F16 Futures $15,000	October 2	Nevers; France	Hard (i)	(France) Édouard Roger-Vasselin	(France) Jean-François Bachelot (France) David Guez
Spain F32 Futures $15,000	October 2	El Ejido; Spain	Hard	(Croatia) Tomislav Perić	(Greece) Alexandros Jakupovic (Netherlands) Antal van der Duim
Australia F10 Futures $15,000	October 2	Traralgon; Australia	Hard	(Australia) Colin Ebelthite	(Australia) Matthew Ebden (United Kingdom) Brydan Klein
Brazil F13 Futures $10,000	October 2	São Leopoldo; Brazil	Clay	(Brazil) Franco Ferreiro	(Canada) Philip Gubenco (Italy) Manuel Jorquera
Venezuela F5 Futures $10,000	October 2	Caracas; Venezuela	Hard	(Venezuela) David Navarrete	(France) Benjamin Dracos (United States) Jason Zimmermann
USA F25 Futures $10,000	October 2	Laguna Niguel; United States	Hard	(United States) Brian Wilson	(United States) Brad Pomeroy (United States) Stephen Ward
Kenya F1 Futures $10,000	October 2	Mombasa; Kenya	Hard	(Morocco) Talal Ouahabi	(Slovakia) Viktor Bruthans (Romania) Bogdan Leonte
Mexico F16 Futures $10,000	October 2	Ciudad Obregón; Mexico	Hard	(Mexico) Carlos Palencia	(Australia) Raphael Durek (Mexico) Carlos Palencia
Mexico F17 Futures $10,000	October 9	Ciudad Obregón; Mexico	Hard	(Mexico) Miguel Gallardo Valles	(Australia) Raphael Durek (Canada) Pierre-Ludovic Duclos
Namibia F1 Futures $10,000	October 9	Windhoek; Namibia	Hard	(India) Mustafa Ghouse	(Slovakia) Martin Hromec (Slovakia) Matus Horecny
Nigeria F5 Futures $15,000	October 9	Lagos; Nigeria	Hard	(Croatia) Ivan Dodig	(Croatia) Ivan Dodig (Bosnia and Herzegovina) Zlatan Kadric
Venezuela F6 Futures $10,000	October 9	Maracay; Venezuela	Hard	(Venezuela) Yohny Romero	(Austria) Christoph Palmanshofer (United States) Jason Zimmermann
Brazil F14 Futures $10,000	October 9	Novo Hamburgo; Brazil	Clay	(Argentina) Diego Cristin	(Brazil) Ricardo Hocevar (Brazil) Alexandre Simoni
Australia F11 Futures $15,000	October 9	Melbourne Park; Australia	Hard	(Sweden) Johan Brunström	(United States) Jamie Cerretani (United States) Phil Stolt
Portugal F4 Futures $10,000	October 9	Albufeira; Portugal	Hard	(Netherlands) Thiemo de Bakker	(Croatia) Vjekoslav Skenderovic (Croatia) Joško Topić
France F17 Futures $15,000	October 9	Saint-Dizier; France	Hard (i)	(Andorra) Laurent Recouderc	(Australia) Joseph Sirianni (Belgium) Stefan Wauters
Great Britain F15 Futures $15,000	October 9	Jersey; Great Britain	Hard (i)	(Switzerland) Jean-Claude Scherrer	(Germany) David Klier (Germany) Philipp Marx
Spain F33 Futures $15,000	October 9	Córdoba; Spain	Hard	(Germany) Matthias Bachinger	(Greece) Alexandros Jakupovic (Spain) Carles Poch Gradin
Brazil F15 Futures $10,000	October 16	Londrina; Brazil	Clay	(Brazil) Caio Zampieri	(Brazil) Leonardo Kirche (Brazil) Caio Zampieri
Portugal F5 Futures $10,000	October 16	Ponta Delgada; Portugal	Hard	(Croatia) Vjekoslav Skenderovic	(Spain) David Canudas-Fernandez (Spain) Carlos Rexach-Itoiz
France F18 Futures $15,000	October 16	La Roche-sur-Yon; France	Hard (i)	(Czech Republic) Lukáš Rosol	(France) Jean-François Bachelot (Uzbekistan) Denis Istomin
Great Britain F16 Futures $15,000	October 16	Glasgow; Great Britain	Hard (i)	(United Kingdom) Richard Bloomfield	(United Kingdom) Josh Goodall (United Kingdom) Ross Hutchins
Nigeria F6 Futures $15,000	October 16	Lagos; Nigeria	Hard	(Ukraine) Illya Marchenko	(Nigeria) Abdul-Mumin Babalola (Togo) Komlavi Loglo
Venezuela F7 Futures $10,000	October 16	Valencia; Venezuela	Hard	(Venezuela) Jhonnatan Medina-Álvarez	(Cuba) Ricardo Chile (Cuba) Luis Javier Cuellar
USA F26 Futures $15,000	October 16	Mansfield; United States	Hard	(South Africa) Izak van der Merwe	(United States) Ryler DeHeart (United States) Jason Marshall
Botswana F1 Futures $10,000	October 16	Gaborone; Botswana	Hard	(Morocco) Talal Ouahabi	(Tunisia) Walid Jallali (Morocco) Talal Ouahabi
Mexico F18 Futures $10,000	October 16	Mazatlán; Mexico	Hard	(Japan) Kei Nishikori	(Mexico) Miguel Gallardo Valles (Mexico) Carlos Palencia
Japan F11 Futures $15,000	October 16	Kashiwa; Japan	Hard	(Japan) Satoshi Iwabuchi	(United States) Minh Le (Japan) Hiroyasu Sato
Japan F12 Futures $15,000	October 23	Tokyo; Japan	Hard	(Australia) Nathan Healey	(Japan) Yaoki Ishii (Japan) Hiroki Kondo
Mexico F19 Futures $10,000	October 23	Monterrey; Mexico	Hard	(Australia) Raphael Durek	(United Kingdom) Simon Childs (Iceland) Arnar Sigurðsson
South Africa F1 Futures $10,000	October 23	Pretoria; South Africa	Hard	(Monaco) Clément Morel	(France) Philippe De Bonnevie (Monaco) Clément Morel
USA F27 Futures $15,000	October 23	Baton Rouge; United States	Hard	(Israel) Dudi Sela	(Serbia) Alex Vlaški (South Africa) Fritz Wolmarans
Portugal F6 Futures $10,000	October 23	Ponta Delgada; Portugal	Hard	(Netherlands) Thiemo de Bakker	(Finland) Tuomas Ketola (Finland) Juho Paukku
France F19 Futures $10,000	October 23	Rodez; France	Hard (i)	(Kazakhstan) Andrey Golubev	(Uzbekistan) Denis Istomin (Czech Republic) Lukáš Rosol
Spain F35 Futures $10,000	October 23	Sant Cugat del Vallès; Spain	Clay	(Spain) Héctor Ruiz-Cadenas	(Spain) Miguel Ángel López Jaén (Spain) David Marrero
Brazil F16 Futures $10,000	October 23	Porto Alegre; Brazil	Clay	(Argentina) Diego Cristin	(Poland) Kacper Owsian (Poland) Filip Urban
Chile F1 Futures $10,000	October 23	Santiago; Chile	Clay	(Peru) Iván Miranda	(Chile) Hermes Gamonal (Chile) Guillermo Hormazábal
Australia F12 Futures $15,000	October 23	Mildura; Australia	Grass	(Australia) Alun Jones	(Australia) Carsten Ball (Australia) Adam Feeney
Ghana F1 Futures $10,000	October 23	Accra; Ghana	Clay	(Tunisia) Walid Jallali	(Morocco) Reda El Amrani (Morocco) Anas Fattar
Australia F13 Futures $15,000	October 30	Berri; Australia	Grass	(Australia) Alun Jones	(Australia) Carsten Ball (Australia) Adam Feeney
Brazil F17 Futures $10,000	October 30	São Paulo; Brazil	Clay	(Argentina) Juan-Pablo Villar	(Hungary) Kornél Bardóczky (Hungary) György Balázs
Chile F2 Futures $10,000	October 30	Talca; Chile	Clay	(Peru) Iván Miranda	(Chile) Jorge Aguilar (Argentina) Martín Alund
Spain F36 Futures $10,000	October 30	Vilafranca; Spain	Clay	(Spain) Bartolomé Salvá Vidal	(Argentina) Diego Álvarez (Spain) Carles Poch Gradin
Mexico F20 Futures $10,000	October 30	Querétaro; Mexico	Hard	(Moldova) Roman Borvanov	(Mexico) Víctor Romero (Mexico) Bruno Rodríguez
Iran F5 Futures $15,000	October 30	Kish Island; Iran	Clay	(Czech Republic) Adam Vejmelka	(Italy) Fabio Colangelo (Italy) Marco Crugnola

=== November ===
Tournament	Date	City	Surface	Singles champions	Doubles champions
Iran F6 Futures $15,000	November 6	Kish Island; Iran	Clay	(Czech Republic) Adam Vejmelka	(Italy) Fabio Colangelo (Italy) Marco Crugnola
USA F28 Futures $15,000	November 6	Waikoloa; United States	Hard	(Israel) Dudi Sela	(Serbia) Alex Vlaški (South Africa) Fritz Wolmarans
Great Britain F17 Futures $15,000	November 6	Redbridge; Great Britain	Hard (i)	(France) David Guez	(United Kingdom) Neil Bamford (United Kingdom) James May
Chile F3 Futures $10,000	November 6	Santiago; Chile	Clay	(Chile) Jorge Aguilar	(Argentina) Diego Cristin (Argentina) Demian Gschwend
Brazil F18 Futures $10,000	November 6	São Paulo; Brazil	Clay	(Argentina) Juan-Pablo Villar	(Hungary) Kornél Bardóczky (Hungary) Attila Balázs
Brazil F19 Futures $10,000	November 13	Itu; Brazil	Clay	(Brazil) Caio Zampieri	(Brazil) Tiago Lopes (Brazil) Caio Zampieri
Chile F4 Futures $10,000	November 13	Santiago; Chile	Clay	(Argentina) Diego Cristin	(Argentina) Diego Cristin (Argentina) Demian Gschwend
Great Britain F18 Futures $15,000	November 13	Sunderland; Great Britain	Hard (i)	(Switzerland) Jean-Claude Scherrer	(United Kingdom) Neil Bamford (United Kingdom) James May
Spain F37 Futures $15,000	November 13	Las Palmas; Spain	Hard	(Kazakhstan) Andrey Golubev	(Italy) Manuel Jorquera (Belgium) Jeroen Masson
Russia F1 Futures $15,000	November 13	Sergiyev Posad; Russia	Hard (i)	(Russia) Konstantin Kravchuk	(Germany) David Klier (Slovakia) Filip Polášek
USA F29 Futures $15,000	November 13	Honolulu; United States	Hard	(Israel) Dudi Sela	(Serbia) Alex Vlaški (South Africa) Fritz Wolmarans
Tunisia F4 Futures $10,000	November 13	Sfax; Tunisia	Hard	(Egypt) Mohamed Mamoun	(Denmark) Rasmus Nørby (Denmark) Martin Pedersen
Tunisia F5 Futures $10,000	November 20	Monastir; Tunisia	Hard	(Ukraine) Orest Tereshchuk	(Netherlands) Michel Koning (Netherlands) Matwé Middelkoop
Uruguay F3 Futures $10,000	November 20	Montevideo; Uruguay	Clay	(Argentina) Diego Cristin	(Argentina) Guillermo Carry (Argentina) Antonio Pastorino
Russia F2 Futures $15,000	November 20	Mosrentgen; Russia	Hard (i)	(Russia) Evgeny Kirillov	(Russia) Alexander Kudryavtsev (Russia) Alexandre Krasnoroutskiy
Spain F38 Futures $15,000	November 20	Gran Canaria; Spain	Clay	(Spain) Marc Fornell Mestres	(Spain) Cesar Ferrer-Victoria (Spain) Marc Fornell Mestres
Israel F4 Futures $10,000	November 20	Ramat HaSharon; Israel	Hard	(Austria) Andreas Haider-Maurer	(Russia) Mikhail Elgin (Israel) Amit Inbar
Chile F5 Futures $10,000	November 20	Antofagasta; Chile	Clay	(Argentina) Jonathan Gonzalia	(Chile) Jorge Aguilar (Argentina) Martín Alund
Brazil F20 Futures $10,000	November 20	Criciúma; Brazil	Clay	(Brazil) Lucas Engel	(Brazil) André Miele (Brazil) João Souza
Brazil F21 Futures $10,000	November 27			(Venezuela) Jhonnatan Medina-Álvarez	(Brazil) André Miele (Brazil) João Souza
Israel F5 Futures $10,000	November 27	Tel Aviv; Israel	Hard	(Croatia) Vjekoslav Skenderovic	(France) Olivier Charroin (France) Philippe De Bonnevie
Uruguay F4 Futures $10,000	November 27	Punta del Este; Uruguay	Clay	(Argentina) Brian Dabul	(Argentina) Brian Dabul (Uruguay) Marcel Felder
Czech Rep. F4 Futures $15,000	November 27	Vendryně; Czech Republic	Hard (i)	(United Kingdom) Josh Goodall	(Czech Republic) Lukáš Rosol (Slovakia) Igor Zelenay
Tunisia F6 Futures $10,000	November 27	Hammam Sousse; Tunisia	Hard	(Croatia) Franko Škugor	(India) Ravishankar Pathanjali (India) Sunil-Kumar Sipaeya

=== December ===
Tournament	Date	City	Surface	Singles champions	Doubles champions
Tunisia F7 Futures $10,000	December 4	Mégrine; Tunisia	Hard	(Tunisia) Malek Jaziri	(United States) Patrick Briaud (United States) Adam Davidson
Czech Rep. F5 Futures $15,000	December 4	Opava; Czech Republic	Carpet (i)	(Czech Republic) Lukáš Rosol	(Czech Republic) Lukáš Rosol (Slovakia) Igor Zelenay
Brazil F22 Futures $10,000	December 4	São Paulo; Brazil	Hard	(Brazil) Caio Zampieri	(Brazil) Eric Gomes (Brazil) Tiago Lopes
Israel F6 Futures $10,000	December 4	Ramat HaSharon; Israel	Hard	(Netherlands) Fred Hemmes	(Russia) Mikhail Elgin (New Zealand) Daniel King-Turner
India F3 Futures $15,000	December 18	Delhi; India	Hard	(Pakistan) Aisam-ul-Haq Qureshi	(Kazakhstan) Alexey Kedryuk (India) Sunil-Kumar Sipaeya
India F4 Futures $15,000	December 25	Delhi; India	Hard	(Hong Kong) Karan Rastogi	(Bulgaria) Todor Enev (Japan) Hiroki Kondo
