= 2006 Wimbledon Championships – Women's doubles qualifying =

Women's doubles qualifying
- 2006 Wimbledon Championships

Events
Singles	men	women		boys	girls
Doubles	men	women	mixed	boys	girls
WC Singles	men	women	quad
WC Doubles	men	women	quad
Legends	men	women	seniors

Qualification
Singles	men	women
Doubles	men	women
- Wimbledon Championships

Players and pairs who need higher rankings or receive wild cards may participate in a qualifying tournament one week before the annual Wimbledon Tennis Championships.

== Seeds ==
1. (Czech Republic) Lucie Hradecká / (Czech Republic) Hana Šromová (qualified)
2. (Russia) Ekaterina Bychkova / (Venezuela) Milagros Sequera (first round)
3. (Argentina) María José Argeri / (Brazil) Letícia Sobral (first round)
4. (Chinese Taipei) Chan Chin-wei / (Chinese Taipei) Hsieh Su-wei (qualifying competition, lucky losers)
5. (France) Stéphanie Cohen-Aloro / (Spain) María José Martínez Sánchez (qualified)
6. (Ukraine) Yuliana Fedak / (Ukraine) Tatiana Perebiynis (qualified)
7. (United States) Lilia Osterloh / (United States) Ahsha Rolle (qualified)
8. (Hungary) Melinda Czink / (United States) Vania King (qualifying competition, lucky losers)

== Qualifiers ==
1. (Czech Republic) Lucie Hradecká / (Czech Republic) Hana Šromová
2. (France) Stéphanie Cohen-Aloro / (Spain) María José Martínez Sánchez
3. (Ukraine) Yuliana Fedak / (Ukraine) Tatiana Perebiynis
4. (United States) Lilia Osterloh / (United States) Ahsha Rolle

== Lucky losers ==
1. (Chinese Taipei) Chan Chin-wei / (Chinese Taipei) Hsieh Su-wei
2. (Hungary) Melinda Czink / (United States) Vania King
3. (Argentina) Mariana Díaz Oliva / (South Africa) Natalie Grandin

== Qualifying draw ==
=== First qualifier ===
First round
1	(Czech Republic) Lucie Hradecká (Czech Republic) Hana Šromová	6	7^{7}
(Puerto Rico) Kristina Brandi (Ukraine) Viktoriya Kutuzova	4	6^{2}
WC	(United Kingdom) Natasha Khan (United Kingdom) Claire Peterzan	0	4
8	(Hungary) Melinda Czink (United States) Vania King	6	6

Qualifying competition
1	(Czech Republic) Lucie Hradecká (Czech Republic) Hana Šromová	6	7
8	(Hungary) Melinda Czink (United States) Vania King	3	5

=== Second qualifier ===
First round
2	(Russia) Ekaterina Bychkova (Venezuela) Milagros Sequera	4	4
(Argentina) Mariana Díaz Oliva (South Africa) Natalie Grandin	6	6
(France) Camille Pin (United States) Neha Uberoi	6	2	2
5	(France) Stéphanie Cohen-Aloro (Spain) María José Martínez Sánchez	3	6	6

Qualifying competition
(Argentina) Mariana Díaz Oliva (South Africa) Natalie Grandin	6	2	4
5	(France) Stéphanie Cohen-Aloro (Spain) María José Martínez Sánchez	3	6	6

=== Third qualifier ===
First round
3	(Argentina) María José Argeri (Brazil) Letícia Sobral	6^{2}	3
(Chinese Taipei) Chan Yung-jan (Ukraine) Olga Savchuk	7^{7}	6
(Brazil) Maria Fernanda Alves (Russia) Vasilisa Bardina	6^{6}	4
6	(Ukraine) Yuliana Fedak (Ukraine) Tatiana Perebiynis	7^{8}	6

Qualifying competition
(Chinese Taipei) Chan Yung-jan (Ukraine) Olga Savchuk	4	3
6	(Ukraine) Yuliana Fedak (Ukraine) Tatiana Perebiynis	6	6

=== Fourth qualifier ===
First round
4	(Chinese Taipei) Chan Chin-wei (Chinese Taipei) Hsieh Su-wei	7^{10}	6
(India) Shikha Uberoi (Ukraine) Julia Vakulenko	6^{8}	4
(Israel) Tzipora Obziler (Italy) Romina Oprandi	1	6^{3}
7	(United States) Lilia Osterloh (United States) Ahsha Rolle	6	7^{7}

Qualifying competition
4	(Chinese Taipei) Chan Chin-wei (Chinese Taipei) Hsieh Su-wei	2	4
7	(United States) Lilia Osterloh (United States) Ahsha Rolle	6	6
