= 2006 Wimbledon Championships =

- Date: 26 June – 9 July
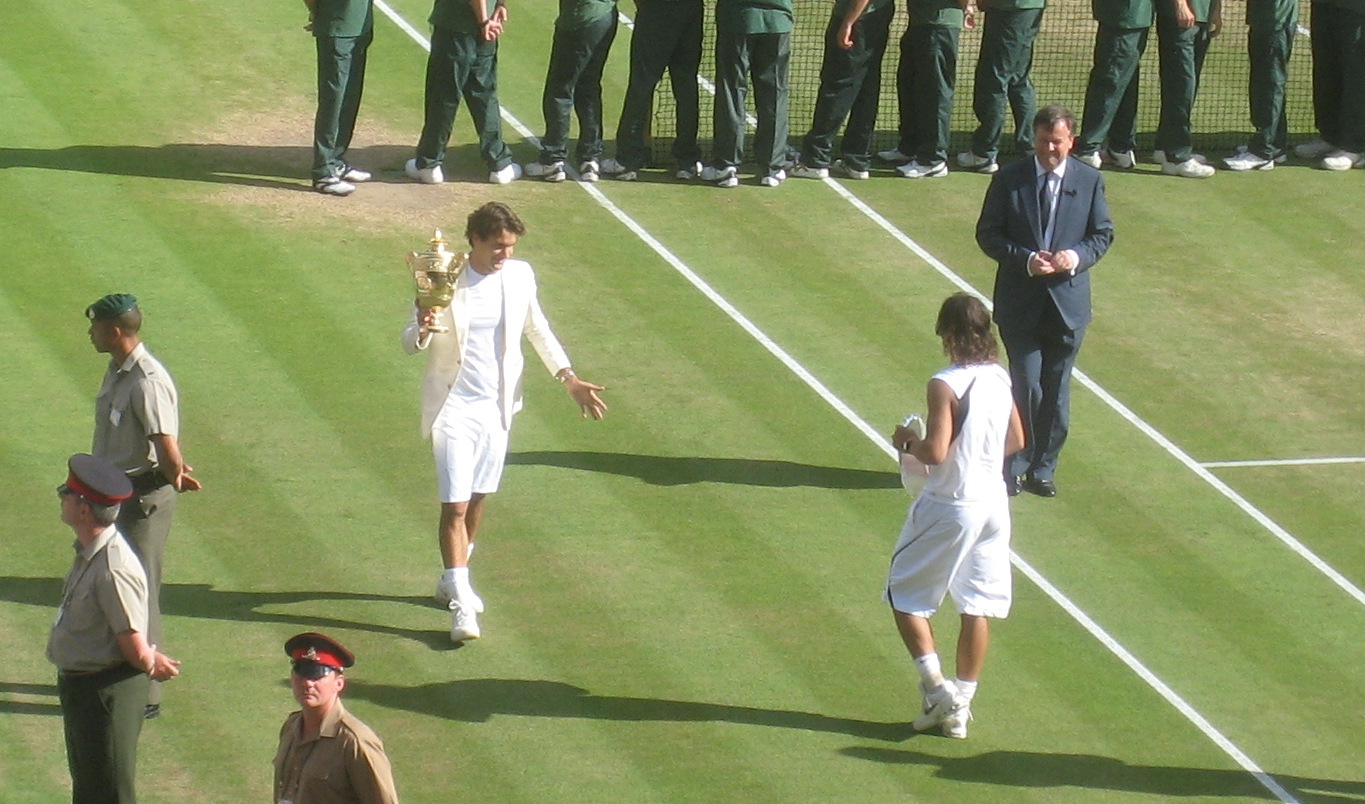
- Edition: 120th
- Category: Grand Slam (ITF)
- Draw: 128S / 64D / 48XD
- Prize money: £10,378,710
- Surface: Grass
- Location: Church Road; SW19, Wimbledon, London, United Kingdom
- Venue: All England Lawn Tennis and Croquet Club

Champions

Men's singles
- (Switzerland) Roger Federer

Women's singles
- (France) Amélie Mauresmo

Men's doubles
- (United States) Bob Bryan / (United States) Mike Bryan

Women's doubles
- (China) Yan Zi / (China) Zheng Jie

Mixed doubles
- (Israel) Andy Ram / (Russia) Vera Zvonareva

Wheelchair men's doubles
- (Japan) Shingo Kunieda / (Japan) Satoshi Saida

Boys' singles
- (Netherlands) Thiemo de Bakker

Girls' singles
- (Denmark) Caroline Wozniacki

Boys' doubles
- (United States) Kellen Damico / (United States) Nathaniel Schnugg

Girls' doubles
- (Russia) Alisa Kleybanova / (Russia) Anastasia Pavlyuchenkova

Gentlemen's invitation doubles
- (Australia) Todd Woodbridge / (Australia) Mark Woodforde

Ladies' invitation doubles
- (United States) Rosalyn Nideffer / (Czech Republic) Jana Novotná

Senior gentlemen's invitation doubles
- (United States) Kevin Curren / (United States) Johan Kriek
- Wimbledon Championships

The 2006 Wimbledon Championships was a tennis tournament played on grass courts at the All England Lawn Tennis and Croquet Club in Wimbledon, London in the United Kingdom. It was the 120th edition of the Wimbledon Championships and were held from 26 June to 9 July 2006. It was the third Grand Slam tennis event of the year.

Roger Federer won his fourth consecutive Wimbledon title, defeating Rafael Nadal in what was to be the first of three consecutive Wimbledon finals played between the pair. Venus Williams was unsuccessful in her title defence, losing in the third round against Jelena Janković. Amélie Mauresmo won her second Grand Slam title, and first and only Wimbledon title, defeating Justine Henin-Hardenne in the final in three sets. Mauresmo thus became the first Frenchwoman since 1925 to win the Wimbledon title. It was Henin-Hardenne's second of three Grand Slam final defeats of 2006, having lost the 2006 Australian Open final to Mauresmo earlier in the year; on that occasion, Henin-Hardenne retired due to a stomach virus.

== Notable stories ==
=== American performance and Serbian breakthrough ===
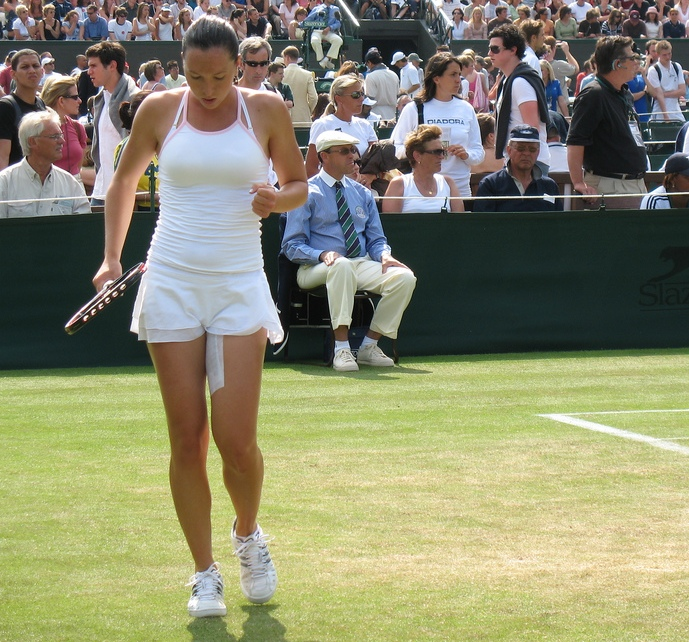
Jelena Janković knocked Venus Williams out of Wimbledon in the third round.

For the first time since 1911, no American player reached the quarter-finals at Wimbledon, and for the first time since the 1976 Australian Open, no American player reached a Grand Slam quarter-final. Shenay Perry was the only American player to reach the fourth round; she was defeated 6–2, 6–0 by Elena Dementieva after losing the last ten games of the match. Her defeat also meant that no American woman reached the Wimbledon final for the first time since 1998.

Venus Williams' third round defeat by Jelena Janković of Serbia (on its first Grand Slam appearance as a newly established independent nation from the former Serbia and Montenegro) caused the earliest exit by a defending women's champion at Wimbledon since Steffi Graf lost in the first round in 1994 and meant that neither of the Williams sisters (Serena Williams withdrew due to injury) would be represented in a Wimbledon final for the first time since 1999. These championships were also the first to feature three Serbian players in the fourth round of any Grand Slam tournament: along with Janković, Ana Ivanovic and Novak Djokovic also reached the fourth round, the former losing to Amélie Mauresmo and the latter losing to Mario Ančić.

=== Li Na's run to the quarter-finals ===
China's Li Na became the first player from her country to ever be seeded or reach the quarter-finals of a Grand Slam tournament. She upset the recent French Open finalist Svetlana Kuznetsova in the third round and followed it up with a win over World No. 10 Nicole Vaidišová in the fourth round, before losing her quarter-final to second seed Kim Clijsters. Li would not reach another Grand Slam quarter-final until the 2009 US Open, where again she was defeated by Clijsters.

=== Streaker incident ===
Midway during the ladies' quarter-final match between Maria Sharapova and Elena Dementieva, a streaker ran onto the Centre Court and interrupted the match, before ultimately being arrested and brought into custody by Wimbledon security guards. The streaker was later revealed to be Dutch DJ Sander Lantinga, who carried out the stunt as part of the Dutch television show Try Before You Die.

== Point and prize money distribution ==
=== Point distribution ===
Below are the tables with the point distribution for each discipline of the tournament.

==== Senior points ====
Event	W	F	SF	QF	Round of 16	Round of 32	Round of 64	Round of 128	Q	Q3	Q2	Q1
Men's singles	1000	700	450	250	150	75	35	5	12	8	4	0
Men's doubles	1000	700	450	250	150	75	0	—N/a	12	—N/a	0	0
Women's singles	650	456	292	162	90	56	32	2	30	21	12.5	4
Women's doubles	650	456	292	162	90	56	0	—N/a	30	—N/a	0	0

=== Prize distribution ===
The total prize money for 2006 championships was £10,378,710. The winner of the men's title earned £655,000 while the women's singles champion earned £625,000.

Event	W	F	SF	QF	Round of 16	Round of 32	Round of 64	Round of 128
Men's singles	£655,000	£327,500	£163,750	£85,150	£45,850	£16,050	£12,840	£9,830
Women's singles	£625,000	£312,500	£151,500	£76,650	£38,970	£21,210	£12,840	£7,860
Men's doubles *	£220,690	£110,340	£56,560	£29,390	£15,600	£8,520	£5,000	—N/a
Women's doubles *	£205,280	£102,650	£51,310	£25,650	£13,230	£6,770	£3,960	—N/a
Mixed doubles *	£90,000	£45,000	£22,500	£10,300	£5,180	£2,600	£1,180	—N/a

_{* per team}

== Champions ==
=== Seniors ===
==== Men's singles ====
(Switzerland) Roger Federer defeated (Spain) Rafael Nadal, 6–0, 7–6^{(7–5)}, 6–7^{(2–7)}, 6–3

==== Women's singles ====
(France) Amélie Mauresmo defeated (Belgium) Justine Henin-Hardenne, 2–6, 6–3, 6–4

==== Men's doubles ====
(United States) Bob Bryan / (United States) Mike Bryan defeated (France) Fabrice Santoro / (Serbia) Nenad Zimonjić, 6–3, 4–6, 6–4, 6–2

==== Women's doubles ====
(China) Yan Zi / (China) Zheng Jie defeated (Spain) Virginia Ruano Pascual / (Argentina) Paola Suárez, 6–3, 3–6, 6–2

==== Mixed doubles ====
(Israel) Andy Ram / (Russia) Vera Zvonareva defeated (United States) Venus Williams / (United States) Bob Bryan, 6–3, 6–2

=== Juniors ===
==== Boys' singles ====
(Netherlands) Thiemo de Bakker defeated (Poland) Marcin Gawron, 6–2, 7–6^{(7–4)}

==== Girls' singles ====
(Denmark) Caroline Wozniacki defeated (Slovakia) Magdaléna Rybáriková, 3–6, 6–1, 6–3

==== Boys' doubles ====
(United States) Kellen Damico / (United States) Nathaniel Schnugg defeated (Slovakia) Martin Kližan / (Slovakia) Andrej Martin, 7–6^{(9–7)}, 6–2

==== Girls' doubles ====
(Russia) Alisa Kleybanova / (Russia) Anastasia Pavlyuchenkova defeated (Ukraine) Khrystyna Antoniichuk / (Romania) Alexandra Dulgheru, 6–1, 6–2

== Other events ==
=== Gentlemen's invitation doubles ===
(Australia) Todd Woodbridge / (Australia) Mark Woodforde defeated (United States) T. J. Middleton / (United States) David Wheaton, 6–7^{(5–7)}, 7–5, 7–6^{(7–4)}

=== Ladies' invitation doubles ===
(United States) Rosalyn Nideffer / (Czech Republic) Jana Novotná defeated (United States) Tracy Austin / (France) Nathalie Tauziat, 6–4, 6–3

=== Senior gentlemen's invitation doubles ===
(United States) Kevin Curren / (United States) Johan Kriek defeated (Australia) Peter McNamara / (Australia) Paul McNamee, 7–5, 6–7^{(8–10)}, 7–6^{(11–9)}

=== Wheelchair men's doubles ===
(Japan) Shingo Kunieda / (Japan) Satoshi Saida defeated (France) Michaël Jeremiasz / (United Kingdom) Jayant Mistry, 7–5, 6–2

== Singles seeds ==
=== Men's singles ===
1. (Switzerland) Roger Federer (champion)
2. (Spain) Rafael Nadal (final, lost to Roger Federer)
3. (United States) Andy Roddick (third round, lost to Andy Murray)
4. (Argentina) David Nalbandian (third round, lost to Fernando Verdasco)
5. (Croatia) Ivan Ljubičić (third round, lost to Dmitry Tursunov)
6. (Australia) Lleyton Hewitt (quarterfinals, lost to Marcos Baghdatis)
7. (Croatia) Mario Ančić (quarterfinals, lost to Roger Federer)
8. (United States) James Blake (third round, lost to Max Mirnyi)
9. (Russia) Nikolay Davydenko (first round, lost to Alejandro Falla)
10. (Chile) Fernando González (third round, lost to David Ferrer)
11. (Spain) Tommy Robredo (second round, lost to Novak Djokovic)
12. (Sweden) Thomas Johansson (first round, lost to Jonas Björkman)
13. (Czech Republic) Tomáš Berdych (fourth round, lost to Roger Federer)
14. (Czech Republic) Radek Štěpánek (quarterfinals, lost to Jonas Björkman)
15. (France) Sébastien Grosjean (third round, lost to Marcos Baghdatis)
16. (Argentina) Gastón Gaudio (second round, lost to Irakli Labadze)
17. (United States) Robby Ginepri (first round, lost to Mardy Fish)
18. (Cyprus) Marcos Baghdatis (semifinals, lost to Rafael Nadal)
19. (Germany) Tommy Haas (third round, lost to Tomáš Berdych)
20. (Slovakia) Dominik Hrbatý (first round, lost to Daniele Bracciali)
21. (France) Gaël Monfils (first round, lost to Igor Kunitsyn)
22. (Finland) Jarkko Nieminen (quarterfinals, lost to Rafael Nadal)
23. (Spain) David Ferrer (fourth round, lost to Lleyton Hewitt)
24. (Spain) Juan Carlos Ferrero (third round, lost to Radek Štěpánek)
25. (United States) Andre Agassi (third round, lost to Rafael Nadal)
26. (Belgium) Olivier Rochus (third round, lost to Lleyton Hewitt)
27. (Russia) Dmitry Tursunov (fourth round, lost to Jarkko Nieminen)
28. (Spain) Fernando Verdasco(fourth round, lost to Radek Štěpánek)
29. (Thailand) Paradorn Srichaphan (first round, lost to Agustín Calleri)
30. (Belgium) Kristof Vliegen (second round, lost to Nicolas Mahut)
31. (Chile) Nicolás Massú (first round, lost to Andy Murray)
32. (France) Paul-Henri Mathieu (first round, lost to Mark Philippoussis)

=== Women's singles ===
1. (France) Amélie Mauresmo (champion)
2. (Belgium) Kim Clijsters (semifinals, lost to Justine Henin-Hardenne)
3. (Belgium) Justine Henin-Hardenne (final, lost to Amélie Mauresmo)
4. (Russia) Maria Sharapova (semifinals, lost to Amélie Mauresmo)
5. (Russia) Svetlana Kuznetsova (third round, lost to Li Na)
6. (United States) Venus Williams (third round, lost to Jelena Janković)
7. (Russia) Elena Dementieva (quarterfinals, lost to Maria Sharapova)
8. (Switzerland) Patty Schnyder (second round, lost to Séverine Brémond)
9. (Russia) Anastasia Myskina (quarterfinals, lost to Amélie Mauresmo)
10. (Czech Republic) Nicole Vaidišová (fourth round, lost to Li Na)
11. (Italy) Francesca Schiavone (first round, lost to Melanie South)
12. (Switzerland) Martina Hingis (third round, lost to Ai Sugiyama)
13. (Germany) Anna-Lena Grönefeld (first round, lost to Tsvetana Pironkova)
14. (Russia) Dinara Safina (third round, lost to Ana Ivanovic)
15. (Slovakia) Daniela Hantuchová (fourth round, lost to Justine Henin-Hardenne)
16. (Italy) Flavia Pennetta (fourth round, lost to Maria Sharapova)
17. (Russia) Maria Kirilenko (first round, lost to Shinobu Asagoe)
18. (Japan) Ai Sugiyama (fourth round, lost to Séverine Brémond)
19. (Serbia) Ana Ivanovic (fourth round, lost to Amélie Mauresmo)
20. (Israel) Shahar Pe'er (second round, lost to Shuai Peng)
21. (Slovenia) Katarina Srebotnik (third round, lost to Daniela Hantuchová)
22. (France) Nathalie Dechy (first round, lost to Sybille Bammer)
23. (Spain) Anabel Medina Garrigues (third round, lost to Anastasia Myskina)
24. (France) Marion Bartoli (second round, lost to Karolina Šprem)
25. (Russia) Elena Likhovtseva (third round, lost to Elena Dementieva)
26. (Serbia) Jelena Janković (fourth round, lost to Anastasia Myskina)
27. (China) Li Na (quarterfinals, lost to Kim Clijsters)
28. (Sweden) Sofia Arvidsson (first round, lost to Eva Birnerová)
29. (France) Tatiana Golovin (second round, lost to Nicole Pratt)
30. (Russia) Anna Chakvetadze (third round, lost to Justine Henin-Hardenne)
31. (Argentina) Gisela Dulko (third round, lost to Séverine Brémond)
32. (Italy) Mara Santangelo (first round, lost to Amy Frazier)

== Wild card entries ==
The following players received wild cards into the main draw senior events.

Men's singles

1. (United Kingdom) Jamie Baker
2. (United Kingdom) Alex Bogdanovic
3. (United Kingdom) Richard Bloomfield
4. (United Kingdom) Jamie Delgado
5. (United Kingdom) Martin Lee
6. (United Kingdom) Alan Mackin
7. (Romania) Andrei Pavel
8. (Australia) Mark Philippoussis

Women's singles

1. (Zimbabwe) Cara Black
2. (United Kingdom) Sarah Borwell
3. (United Kingdom) Naomi Cavaday
4. (United Kingdom) Anne Keothavong
5. (Australia) Alicia Molik
6. (United Kingdom) Katie O'Brien
7. (Poland) Agnieszka Radwańska
8. (United Kingdom) Melanie South

Men's doubles

1. (United Kingdom) James Auckland / (United Kingdom) Jamie Delgado
2. ~~(United Kingdom) Lee Childs~~ / ~~(Romania) Andrei Pavel~~ (Withdrew)
3. (United Kingdom) Colin Fleming / (United Kingdom) Jamie Murray
4. (United Kingdom) Josh Goodall / (United Kingdom) Ross Hutchins
5. (United Kingdom) Martin Lee / (United Kingdom) Jonathan Marray

Women's doubles

1. (United Kingdom) Sarah Borwell / (United Kingdom) Jane O'Donoghue
2. (United Kingdom) Claire Curran / (United States) Jamea Jackson
3. (United Kingdom) Amanda Keen / (United Kingdom) Anne Keothavong
4. (United Kingdom) Rebecca Llewellyn / (United Kingdom) Karen Paterson
5. (United Kingdom) Katie O'Brien / (United Kingdom) Melanie South

Mixed doubles

1. (Australia) Wayne Arthurs / (Australia) Alicia Molik
2. (United Kingdom) James Auckland / (United Kingdom) Claire Curran
3. (Australia) Paul Hanley / (Ukraine) Tatiana Perebiynis
4. (United Kingdom) Andy Murray / (Belgium) Kirsten Flipkens
5. (Czech Republic) Cyril Suk / (Czech Republic) Helena Suková

== Qualifier entries ==
=== Men's singles ===
1. (United States) Kevin Kim
2. (Georgia (country)) Irakli Labadze
3. (Croatia) Roko Karanušić
4. (Spain) Marcel Granollers
5. (Germany) Michael Berrer
6. (Canada) Frank Dancevic
7. (Colombia) Alejandro Falla
8. (Germany) Simon Stadler
9. (Austria) Alexander Peya
10. (Denmark) Kristian Pless
11. (United Kingdom) Josh Goodall
12. (Italy) Stefano Galvani
13. (Australia) Wayne Arthurs
14. (Germany) Benedikt Dorsch
15. (United States) Robert Kendrick
16. (Germany) Benjamin Becker

The following player received entry into the lucky loser spot:

1. (France) Jean-Christophe Faurel

=== Women's singles ===
1. (Italy) Romina Oprandi
2. (Australia) Nicole Pratt
3. (France) Séverine Brémond
4. (Thailand) Tamarine Tanasugarn
5. (Argentina) Clarisa Fernández
6. (Germany) Kristina Barrois
7. (Chinese Taipei) Chan Yung-jan
8. (Russia) Vasilisa Bardina
9. (Croatia) Ivana Abramović
10. (United States) Meilen Tu
11. (Russia) Yaroslava Shvedova
12. (Belgium) Kirsten Flipkens

The following player received entry into the lucky loser spot:

1. (Ukraine) Julia Vakulenko

=== Men's doubles ===
1. (Georgia (country)) Irakli Labadze / (Serbia) Dušan Vemić
2. (United Kingdom) Neil Bamford / (United Kingdom) Jim May
3. (Paraguay) Ramón Delgado / (Brazil) André Sá
4. (United States) Kevin Kim / (Philippines) Cecil Mamiit

The following teams received entry into the lucky loser spot:

1. (Thailand) Sanchai Ratiwatana / (Thailand) Sonchat Ratiwatana
2. (United States) Zack Fleishman / (Australia) Robert Smeets
3. (Czech Republic) Tomáš Cakl / (Czech Republic) Pavel Šnobel
4. (Canada) Frédéric Niemeyer / (United States) Glenn Weiner

=== Women's doubles ===
1. (Czech Republic) Lucie Hradecká / (Czech Republic) Hana Šromová
2. (France) Stéphanie Cohen-Aloro / (Spain) María José Martínez Sánchez
3. (Ukraine) Yuliana Fedak / (Ukraine) Tatiana Perebiynis
4. (United States) Lilia Osterloh / (United States) Ahsha Rolle

The following teams received entry into the lucky loser spot:

1. (Chinese Taipei) Chan Chin-wei / (Chinese Taipei) Hsieh Su-wei
2. (Hungary) Melinda Czink / (United States) Vania King
3. (Argentina) Mariana Díaz Oliva / (South Africa) Natalie Grandin

== Withdrawals ==
Men's Singles

Before the tournament

- (Argentina) José Acasuso → replaced by (Belgium) Dick Norman
- (Russia) Igor Andreev → replaced by (Spain) Guillermo García López
- (Argentina) Guillermo Coria → replaced by (Chinese Taipei) Lu Yen-hsun
- (United States) Taylor Dent → replaced by (Czech Republic) Tomáš Zíb
- (Romania) Victor Hănescu → replaced by (Romania) Răzvan Sabău
- (Germany) Nicolas Kiefer → replaced by (France) Jean-Christophe Faurel
- (Spain) Carlos Moyá → replaced by (Netherlands) Melle van Gemerden

Women's Singles

Before the tournament

- (United States) Lindsay Davenport → replaced by (Germany) Sandra Klösel
- (Spain) Nuria Llagostera Vives → replaced by (Croatia) Ivana Lisjak
- (Russia) Nadia Petrova → replaced by (Ukraine) Julia Vakulenko
- (France) Mary Pierce → replaced by (Belarus) Victoria Azarenka
- (Czech Republic) Lucie Šafářová → replaced by (Ukraine) Kateryna Bondarenko
- (Italy) Roberta Vinci → replaced by (Chinese Taipei) Hsieh Su-wei
- (United States) Serena Williams → replaced by (United States) Lilia Osterloh

During the tournament

- (Ukraine) Viktoriya Kutuzova

Preceded by 2006 French Open	Grand Slams	Succeeded by 2006 US Open
