= Svetla =

Svetla (Bulgarian: Светла) is a feminine given name. It may refer to:

- Svetla Bozhkova (born 1951), retired female discus thrower who competed for Bulgaria at two Summer Olympics: 1972 and 1980
- Svetla Dimitrova (born 1970), Bulgarian athlete who started out competing in heptathlon and later specialized as a sprint hurdler
- Svetla Mitkova-Sınırtaş (born 1964), retired athlete who competed in shot put and discus throw
- Svetla Protich (born 1939), Bulgarian classical pianist and professor of music
- Svetla Zlateva (born 1952), retired Bulgarian sprinter and middle-distance runner who specialized in the 400 and 800 metres

== See also ==
- Světlá, village and municipality (obec) in Blansko District in the South Moravian Region of the Czech Republic
