= Tomáš Cakl =

Czech tennis player (born 1981)

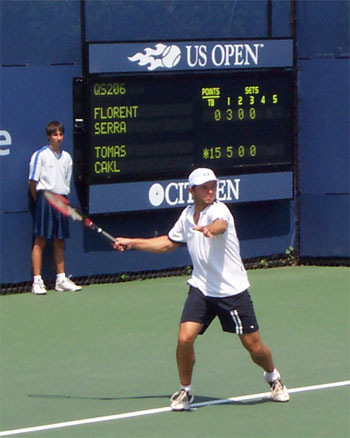
- Tomáš Cakl At The U.S. Open
- Country (sports): Czech Republic
- Residence: Svetla, Czech Republic
- Born: 25 April 1981 (age 44); Ledeč nad Sázavou, Czech Republic
- Height: 1.78 m (5 ft 10 in)
- Turned pro: 2000
- Plays: Right-handed (two-handed backhand)
- Prize money: $293,005

Singles
- Career record: 3–9
- Career titles: 0; 1 Challenger, 2 Futures
- Highest ranking: No. 142 (20 February 2006)

Grand Slam singles results
- Australian Open: Q3 (2004, 2006)
- French Open: Q3 (2005, 2006)
- Wimbledon: Q1 (2005, 2006)
- US Open: Q2 (2004)

Doubles
- Career record: 0–2
- Career titles: 0; 1 Challenger, 1 Futures
- Highest ranking: No. 346 (2 August 2004)

Grand Slam doubles results
- Wimbledon: 1R (2006)
- Last updated on: 3 December 2021.

Tomáš Cakl (born 25 April 1981) is a professional male tennis player from the Czech Republic. He turned pro in 2000, and reached a career high singles ranking of No. 142 in February 2006. He's mostly been playing challenger tournaments.

== Performance timeline ==
Key
W	F	SF	QF	#R	RR	Q#	DNQ	A	NH

(W) winner; (F) finalist; (SF) semifinalist; (QF) quarterfinalist; (#R) rounds 4, 3, 2, 1; (RR) round-robin stage; (Q#) qualification round; (DNQ) did not qualify; (A) absent; (NH) not held; (SR) strike rate (events won / competed); (W–L) win–loss record.

=== Singles ===
Tournament	2001	2002	2003	2004	2005	2006	2007	SR	W–L	Win%
Grand Slam tournaments
Australian Open	A	A	A	Q3	Q1	Q3	Q1	0 / 0	0–0	–
French Open	A	A	A	Q1	Q3	Q3	A	0 / 0	0–0	–
Wimbledon	A	A	A	A	Q1	Q1	A	0 / 0	0–0	–
US Open	Q1	A	A	Q2	Q1	Q1	Q1	0 / 0	0–0	–
Win–loss	0–0	0–0	0–0	0–0	0–0	0–0	0–0	0 / 0	0–0	–
ATP Tour Masters 1000
Indian Wells	A	A	A	Q1	A	A	A	0 / 0	0–0	–
Miami	A	A	A	A	A	Q1	A	0 / 0	0–0	–
Win–loss	0–0	0–0	0–0	0–0	0–0	0–0	0–0	0 / 0	0–0	–

== ATP Challenger and ITF Futures Finals ==
=== Singles: 12 (3–9) ===
Legend ATP Challenger (1–5) ITF Futures (2–4)	Finals by surface Hard (2–5) Clay (1–3) Grass (0–0) Carpet (0–1)

Result	W–L	Date	Tournament	Tier	Surface	Opponent	Score
Loss	0–1	Nov 2000	Cyprus F1, Nicosia	Futures	Clay	(Austria) Oliver Marach	2–6, 4–6
Loss	0–2	Feb 2001	Croatia F1, Zagreb	Futures	Hard	(Croatia) Lovro Zovko	7–6^{(7–2)}, 3–6, 6–7^{(6–8)}
Win	1–2	Feb 2003	Croatia F1, Zagreb	Futures	Hard	(Croatia) Roko Karanušić	7–6^{(7–3)}, 6–4
Loss	1–3	Jun 2003	Czech Republic F1, Most	Futures	Clay	(Czech Republic) Jan Masik	5–7, 6–7^{(10–12)}
Loss	1–4	Jun 2003	Czech Republic F2, Karlovy Vary	Futures	Clay	(Czech Republic) Radim Zitko	6–4, 1–6, 6–7^{(2–7)}
Win	2–4	Jun 2003	Czech Republic F3, Jablonec	Futures	Clay	(Spain) Mario Munoz	6–3, 6–2
Win	3–4	Sep 2003	Donetsk, Ukraine	Challenger	Hard	(Ukraine) Orest Tereshchuk	5–7, 7–6^{(7–5)}, 7–6^{(7–0)}
Loss	3–5	Nov 2005	Helsinki, Finland	Challenger	Hard	(Sweden) Björn Rehnquist	6–7^{(2–7)}, 6–7^{(4–7)}
Loss	3–6	Feb 2006	Belgrade, Serbia	Challenger	Carpet	(Serbia and Montenegro) Janko Tipsarević	4–6, 1–4 ret.
Loss	3–7	Sep 2006	Donetsk, Ukraine	Challenger	Hard	(Socialist Federal Republic of Yugoslavia) Ilija Bozoljac	4–6, 6–3, 5–7
Loss	3–8	Dec 2007	New Delhi, India	Challenger	Hard	(Russia) Mikhail Elgin	6–7^{(4–7)}, 7–6^{(8–6)}, 3–6
Loss	3–9	Aug 2008	New Delhi, India	Challenger	Hard	(Republic of Ireland) Conor Niland	4–6, 4–6

=== Doubles: 5 (2–3) ===
Legend ATP Challenger (1–1) ITF Futures (1–2)	Finals by surface Hard (1–2) Clay (1–1) Grass (0–0) Carpet (0–0)

Result	W–L	Date	Tournament	Tier	Surface	Partner	Opponents	Score
Win	1–0	Nov 2000	Spain F14, Las Palmas	Futures	Clay	(Argentina) Diego Hipperdinger	(Switzerland) Marco Chiudinelli (Japan) Jun Kato	6–2, 6–2
Loss	1–1	Nov 2002	Czech Republic F7, Frýdlant	Futures	Hard	(Czech Republic) Jan Mertl	(Czech Republic) Lukáš Dlouhý (Czech Republic) David Miketa	6–2, 3–6, 4–6
Loss	1–2	Sep 2003	San Antonio, United States	Challenger	Hard	(South Africa) Louis Vosloo	(United States) Paul Goldstein (United States) Jeff Morrison	3–6, 2–6
Win	2–2	Nov 2008	Yokohama, Japan	Challenger	Hard	(Slovakia) Marek Semjan	(United States) Brendan Evans (Austria) Martin Slanar	6–3, 7–6^{(7–1)}
Loss	2–3	Jul 2012	Czech Republic F6, Liberec	Futures	Clay	(Czech Republic) Lubomir Majsajdr	(Czech Republic) Jaroslav Pospíšil (Czech Republic) Jan Šátral	2–6, 4–6
