= 2006 Wimbledon Championships – Men's doubles =

Men's doubles
- 2006 Wimbledon Championships

Final
- Champions: (United States) Bob Bryan (United States) Mike Bryan
- Runners-up: (France) Fabrice Santoro (Serbia) Nenad Zimonjić
- Score: 6–3, 4–6, 6–4, 6–2

Details
- Draw: 64 (4 Q / 4 WC )
- Seeds: 16

Events
Singles	men	women		boys	girls
Doubles	men	women	mixed	boys	girls
WC Singles	men	women	quad
WC Doubles	men	women	quad
Legends	men	women	seniors
← 2005 ·	Wimbledon Championships	· 2007 →

Bob and Mike Bryan defeated Fabrice Santoro and Nenad Zimonjić in the final, 6–3, 4–6, 6–4, 6–2 to win the gentlemen's doubles tennis title at the 2006 Wimbledon Championships. With the win, the Bryan brothers completed the career Grand Slam. It was their record seventh consecutive major final.

Stephen Huss and Wesley Moodie were the defending champions, but lost in the third round to Simon Aspelin and Todd Perry.

The quarterfinal match between Mark Knowles & Daniel Nestor and Aspelin & Perry became, at the time, the longest match ever played at Wimbledon, lasting 6 hours and 9 minutes, with Knowles & Nestor winning the match 5–7, 6–3, 6–7^{(5–7)}, 6–3, 23–21. This record was eventually broken at the 2010 Championships, in the first round men's singles match between John Isner and Nicolas Mahut. It remains the longest doubles match played at any major, and that record is highly unlikely to be broken, since all majors now play best-of-3 sets.

== Seeds ==
1. (United States) Bob Bryan / (United States) Mike Bryan (champions)
2. (Sweden) Jonas Björkman / (Belarus) Max Mirnyi (quarterfinals)
3. (The Bahamas) Mark Knowles / (Canada) Daniel Nestor (semifinals)
4. (Australia) Paul Hanley / (Zimbabwe) Kevin Ullyett (quarterfinals)
5. (Israel) Jonathan Erlich / (Israel) Andy Ram (third round)
6. (France) Fabrice Santoro / (Serbia) Nenad Zimonjić (final)
7. (Czech Republic) Martin Damm / (India) Leander Paes (semifinals)
8. (Sweden) Simon Aspelin / (Australia) Todd Perry (quarterfinals)
9. (Australia) Stephen Huss / (South Africa) Wesley Moodie (third round)
10. (Poland) Mariusz Fyrstenberg / (Poland) Marcin Matkowski (first round)
11. (Czech Republic) Lukáš Dlouhý / (Czech Republic) Pavel Vízner (quarterfinals)
12. (Czech Republic) František Čermák / (Czech Republic) Leoš Friedl (first round)
13. (India) Mahesh Bhupathi / (Germany) Alexander Waske (first round)
14. (Zimbabwe) Wayne Black / (South Africa) Jeff Coetzee (first round)
15. (Argentina) Martín García / (Argentina) Sebastián Prieto (third round)
16. (South Africa) Chris Haggard / (Slovakia) Dominik Hrbatý (first round)

Click on the seed number of a player to go to their draw section.

== Draw ==
=== Key ===
- Q = Qualifier
- WC = Wild card
- LL = Lucky loser
- Alt = Alternate
- ITF = ITF entry
- PR = Protected ranking
- SR = Special ranking
- SE = Special exempt
- JE = Junior exempt
- JR = Junior Accelerator Programme entrant
- CO = College Accelerator Programme entrant
- NG = Next Gen Accelerator Program entrant
- w/o = Walkover
- r = Retired
- d = Defaulted

=== Finals ===
Quarterfinals
1	(United States) Bob Bryan (United States) Mike Bryan	7^{7}	7^{7}	6
11	(Czech Republic) Lukáš Dlouhý (Czech Republic) Pavel Vízner	6^{4}	6^{5}	1
3	(The Bahamas) Mark Knowles (Canada) Daniel Nestor	5	6	6^{5}	6	23
8	(Sweden) Simon Aspelin (Australia) Todd Perry	7	3	7^{7}	3	21
7	(Czech Republic) Martin Damm (India) Leander Paes	7^{10}	6^{5}	6^{5}	7^{9}	6
4	(Australia) Paul Hanley (Zimbabwe) Kevin Ullyett	6^{8}	7^{7}	7^{7}	6^{7}	2
6	(France) Fabrice Santoro (Serbia) Nenad Zimonjić	6	6	6
2	(Sweden) Jonas Björkman (Belarus) Max Mirnyi	4	4	4

Semifinals
1	(United States) Bob Bryan (United States) Mike Bryan	6	6^{3}	7^{7}	6
3	(The Bahamas) Mark Knowles (Canada) Daniel Nestor	4	7^{7}	6^{3}	1
7	(Czech Republic) Martin Damm (India) Leander Paes	2	1	5
6	(France) Fabrice Santoro (Serbia) Nenad Zimonjić	6	6	7

Final
1	(United States) Bob Bryan (United States) Mike Bryan	6	4	6	6
6	(France) Fabrice Santoro (Serbia) Nenad Zimonjić	3	6	4	2

=== Top half ===
==== Section 1 ====
First round
1	(United States) B Bryan (United States) M Bryan	6^{2}	6	6^{4}	6	11
(United States) A Delić (Australia) J Kerr	7^{7}	3	7^{7}	3	9
(Slovakia) M Mertiňák (Czech Republic) P Pála	6	6	6
(Italy) L Azzaro (Italy) A di Mauro	3	2	3
WC	(United Kingdom) M Lee (United Kingdom) J Marray	1	6^{5}	4
(Australia) A Fisher (United States) B Reynolds	6	7^{7}	6
LL	(Canada) F Niemeyer (United States) G Weiner	7^{7}	6	7^{9}
13	(India) M Bhupathi (Germany) A Waske	6^{2}	3	6^{7}
11	(Czech Republic) L Dlouhý (Czech Republic) P Vízner	7^{7}	6	3	6
(France) J Benneteau (France) N Mahut	6^{3}	4	6	3
(Germany) L Burgsmüller (Austria) O Marach	5	4	6	6	6
(Italy) D Sanguinetti (Italy) A Seppi	7	6	3	4	4
(Australia) W Arthurs (United States) J Gimelstob	5	6	6	6
(Spain) D Ferrer (Spain) T Robredo	7	3	4	2
(Czech Republic) I Minář (Czech Republic) J Vaněk	2	1	4
5	(Israel) J Erlich (Israel) A Ram	6	6	6

Second round
1	(United States) B Bryan (United States) M Bryan	6	6	6
(Slovakia) M Mertiňák (Czech Republic) P Pála	1	4	4
(Australia) A Fisher (United States) B Reynolds	3	6	6	6
LL	(Canada) F Niemeyer (United States) G Weiner	6	3	2	2
11	(Czech Republic) L Dlouhý (Czech Republic) P Vízner	4	6	7^{8}	7^{7}
(Germany) L Burgsmüller (Austria) O Marach	6	2	6^{6}	6^{4}
(Australia) W Arthurs (United States) J Gimelstob	5	3	6	6^{6}
5	(Israel) J Erlich (Israel) A Ram	7	6	3	7^{8}

Third round
1	(United States) B Bryan (United States) M Bryan	6^{5}	6	6	6
(Australia) A Fisher (United States) B Reynolds	7^{7}	4	4	2
11	(Czech Republic) L Dlouhý (Czech Republic) P Vízner	7^{7}	6	4	7^{7}
5	(Israel) J Erlich (Israel) A Ram	6^{4}	4	6	6^{5}

Quarterfinals
1	(United States) B Bryan (United States) M Bryan	7^{7}	7^{7}	6
11	(Czech Republic) L Dlouhý (Czech Republic) P Vízner	6^{4}	6^{5}	1

==== Section 2 ====
First round
3	(The Bahamas) M Knowles (Canada) D Nestor	4	6	6	6
(Argentina) L Arnold Ker (Argentina) D Nalbandian	6	3	4	2
(United States) P Goldstein (United States) J Thomas	2	3	3
(Switzerland) Y Allegro (Belgium) K Vliegen	6	6	6
(Spain) N Almagro (Spain) A Portas	3	6^{3}	3
(Italy) P Starace (Croatia) L Zovko	6	7^{7}	6
WC	(United Kingdom) J Auckland (United Kingdom) J Delgado	6	4	2	6	6
14	(Zimbabwe) W Black (South Africa) J Coetzee	4	6	6	4	3
9	(Australia) S Huss (South Africa) W Moodie	6	6	6^{1}	6
(Brazil) M Daniel (Spain) F Vicente	2	1	7^{7}	1
(Germany) C Kas (Germany) F Mayer	1	6^{5}	4
(Austria) A Peya (Germany) B Phau	6	7^{7}	6
Q	(United States) K Kim (Philippines) C Mamiit	4	6	3	7^{7}	6
LL	(Thailand) Sa Ratiwatana (Thailand) So Ratiwatana	6	3	6	6^{5}	8
Q	(United Kingdom) N Bamford (United Kingdom) J May	4	3	3
8	(Sweden) S Aspelin (Australia) T Perry	6	6	6

Second round
3	(The Bahamas) M Knowles (Canada) D Nestor	6	4	7^{10}	6
(Switzerland) Y Allegro (Belgium) K Vliegen	4	6	6^{8}	2
(Italy) P Starace (Croatia) L Zovko	6^{4}	1	5
WC	(United Kingdom) J Auckland (United Kingdom) J Delgado	7^{7}	6	7
9	(Australia) S Huss (South Africa) W Moodie	7	6^{4}	3	7	6
(Austria) A Peya (Germany) B Phau	5	7^{7}	6	5	3
LL	(Thailand) Sa Ratiwatana (Thailand) So Ratiwatana	4	4	2
8	(Sweden) S Aspelin (Australia) T Perry	6	6	6

Third round
3	(The Bahamas) M Knowles (Canada) D Nestor	7^{7}	6	7
WC	(United Kingdom) J Auckland (United Kingdom) J Delgado	6^{3}	4	5
9	(Australia) S Huss (South Africa) W Moodie	7^{7}	6	6^{5}	6^{4}
8	(Sweden) S Aspelin (Australia) T Perry	6^{5}	7	7^{7}	7^{7}

Quarterfinals
3	(The Bahamas) M Knowles (Canada) D Nestor	5	6	6^{5}	6	23
8	(Sweden) S Aspelin (Australia) T Perry	7	3	7^{7}	3	21

=== Bottom half ===
==== Section 3 ====
First round
7	(Czech Republic) M Damm (India) L Paes	7^{7}	6	0
(Serbia) J Tipsarević (Russia) M Youzhny	6^{4}	3	0^{r}
(Czech Republic) J Hernych (Czech Republic) D Škoch	3	6	7^{7}	6
(Finland) J Nieminen (United States) G Oliver	6	3	6^{1}	1
(Germany) P Petzschner (Belgium) O Rochus	6	6	3	6
(Czech Republic) J Levinský (Sweden) R Lindstedt	4	2	6	3
(Czech Republic) C Suk (Czech Republic) R Vik	7	6^{10}	6	7^{7}
12	(Czech Republic) F Čermák (Czech Republic) L Friedl	5	7^{12}	4	6^{2}
16	(South Africa) C Haggard (Slovakia) D Hrbatý	4	6	6	3	4
(United States) T Phillips (Netherlands) R Wassen	6	3	4	6	6
(Spain) A Martín (Spain) R Ramírez Hidalgo	3	6	5	2
Q	(Georgia (country)) I Labadze (Serbia) D Vemić	6	2	7	6
(United States) T Parrott (United States) V Spadea	7^{7}	4	4	7^{7}	1
(Germany) M Kohlmann (Germany) R Schüttler	6^{4}	6	6	6^{2}	6
(France) F Serra (France) G Simon	3	4	4
4	(Australia) P Hanley (Zimbabwe) K Ullyett	6	6	6

Second round
7	(Czech Republic) M Damm (India) L Paes	6	6	6
(Czech Republic) J Hernych (Czech Republic) D Škoch	4	4	3
(Germany) P Petzschner (Belgium) O Rochus	6	3	4	2
(Czech Republic) C Suk (Czech Republic) R Vik	4	6	6	6
(United States) T Phillips (Netherlands) R Wassen	6	6	3	5	4
Q	(Georgia (country)) I Labadze (Serbia) D Vemić	4	4	6	7	6
(Germany) M Kohlmann (Germany) R Schüttler	4	6^{1}	7^{7}	6^{5}
4	(Australia) P Hanley (Zimbabwe) K Ullyett	6	7^{7}	6^{5}	7^{7}

Third round
7	(Czech Republic) M Damm (India) L Paes	6	6	7^{7}
(Czech Republic) C Suk (Czech Republic) R Vik	2	1	6^{1}
Q	(Georgia (country)) I Labadze (Serbia) D Vemić	3	7^{7}	3	7^{7}	7
4	(Australia) P Hanley (Zimbabwe) K Ullyett	6	6^{5}	6	6^{4}	9

Quarterfinals
7	(Czech Republic) M Damm (India) L Paes	7^{10}	6^{5}	6^{5}	7^{9}	6
4	(Australia) P Hanley (Zimbabwe) K Ullyett	6^{8}	7^{7}	7^{7}	6^{7}	2

==== Section 4 ====
First round
6	(France) F Santoro (Serbia) N Zimonjić	7^{7}	6	7^{8}
(Germany) P Kohlschreiber (Russia) D Tursunov	6^{3}	2	6^{6}
(Belgium) C Rochus (Switzerland) S Wawrinka	6	6	6^{4}	4	3
WC	(United Kingdom) J Goodall (United Kingdom) R Hutchins	3	4	7^{7}	6	6
LL	(United States) Z Fleishman (Australia) R Smeets	7^{8}	6	7
WC	(United Kingdom) C Fleming (United Kingdom) J Murray	6^{6}	4	5
Q	(Paraguay) R Delgado (Brazil) A Sá	2	6	6	4	6
10	(Poland) M Fyrstenberg (Poland) M Matkowski	6	4	3	6	3
15	(Argentina) M García (Argentina) S Prieto	7^{7}	6	6
(Croatia) I Ljubičić (Italy) U Vico	6^{4}	3	4
(Austria) J Melzer (Luxembourg) G Müller	6^{5}	6^{5}	6^{3}
(Italy) D Bracciali (Serbia) N Djokovic	7^{7}	7^{7}	7^{7}
LL	(Czech Republic) T Cakl (Czech Republic) P Šnobel	3	4	3
(Poland) Ł Kubot (Czech Republic) T Zíb	6	6	6
(Czech Republic) T Cibulec (Czech Republic) J Novák	3	2	2
2	(Sweden) J Björkman (Belarus) M Mirnyi	6	6	6

Second round
6	(France) F Santoro (Serbia) N Zimonjić	6^{3}	6	6	6
WC	(United Kingdom) J Goodall (United Kingdom) R Hutchins	7^{7}	4	4	4
LL	(United States) Z Fleishman (Australia) R Smeets	2	3	2
Q	(Paraguay) R Delgado (Brazil) A Sá	6	6	6
15	(Argentina) M García (Argentina) S Prieto	6	7^{7}	6
(Italy) D Bracciali (Serbia) N Djokovic	4	6^{3}	4
(Poland) Ł Kubot (Czech Republic) T Zíb	3	2	2
2	(Sweden) J Björkman (Belarus) M Mirnyi	6	6	6

Third round
6	(France) F Santoro (Serbia) N Zimonjić	6	6	7^{9}
Q	(Paraguay) R Delgado (Brazil) A Sá	4	4	6^{7}
15	(Argentina) M García (Argentina) S Prieto	1	4	7^{7}	3
2	(Sweden) J Björkman (Belarus) M Mirnyi	6	6	6^{4}	6

Quarterfinals
6	(France) F Santoro (Serbia) N Zimonjić	6	6	6
2	(Sweden) J Björkman (Belarus) M Mirnyi	4	4	4
