= Neil Bamford =

British tennis player

- Full name: Neil Bamford
- Country (sports): Great Britain
- Born: 10 February 1982 (age 43)
- Plays: Right-handed
- Prize money: $51,328

Singles
- Highest ranking: No. 555 (9 January 2006)

Doubles
- Career record: 0–3
- Highest ranking: No. 271 (27 November 2006)

Grand Slam doubles results
- Wimbledon: 1R (2006, 2007, 2008)

Neil Bamford (born 10 February 1982) is a British former professional tennis player.

== Biography ==
Bamford, a right-handed player from Hertfordshire, made three main draw appearance at Wimbledon. In 2006 and 2007 he featured in the main draw partnering Jim May, the first of those appearances coming as successful qualifiers. At the 2008 Wimbledon Championships he was granted a wildcard for a second time and played with Josh Goodall. He and Goodall were losing finalists at the Mexico City Challenger in 2008.

Retiring after the 2008 season, he now works as a tennis coach at Dukes Meadows in London.
