= Jim May (tennis) =

British tennis player (born 1981)

- Full name: James May
- Country (sports): Great Britain
- Born: 17 June 1981 (age 45)
- Prize money: $33,126

Singles
- Highest ranking: No. 718 (19 June 2006)

Doubles
- Career record: 0–2
- Highest ranking: No. 242 (7 May 2007)

Grand Slam doubles results
- Wimbledon: 1R (2006, 2007)
Medal record
Men's Tennis
Representing Great Britain
Summer Universiade
Gold medal – first place	2003 Daegu	Men's Doubles

James May (born 17 June 1981) is a British former professional tennis player.

== Biography ==
May grew up in Kent and attended Dartford Grammar School. He studied sports science at Loughborough University, graduating in 2004. During his time at Loughborough he represented Great Britain at the 2003 Summer Universiade in Daegu and won a gold medal in the men's doubles with Iain Bates.

On the professional tour he reached as high as 242 in the world in doubles. He made two main draw appearances at Wimbledon, as a qualifier in 2006 and wildcard in 2007, both times partnering Neil Bamford.
