= 2011 Novak Djokovic tennis season =

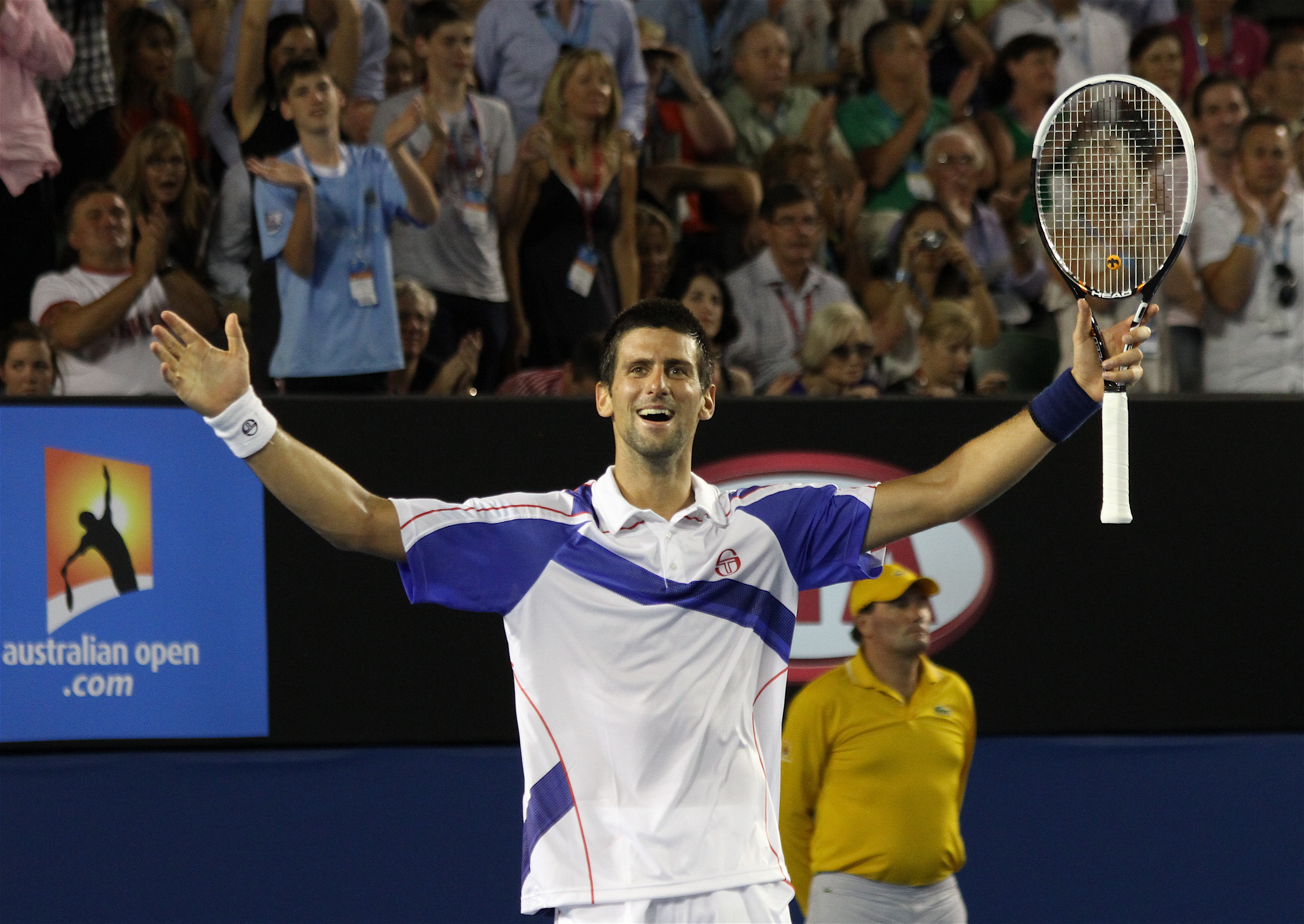
- Full name: Novak Djokovic
- Calendar prize money: $12,619,803 (singles & doubles)

Singles
- Season record: 70–6
- Calendar titles: 10
- Year-end ranking: No. 1
- Ranking change from previous year: ▲2

Grand Slam & significant results
- Australian Open: W
- French Open: SF
- Wimbledon: W
- US Open: W
- Other tournaments
- Tour Finals: RR

Doubles
- Season record: 3–5
- Calendar titles: 0
- Year-end ranking: 240
- Ranking change from previous year: ▼77

Davis Cup
- Davis Cup: SF

Injuries
- Injuries: 7–21 February (shoulder injury); 11–25 April (knee injury); 6–20 June (patellar tendinitis); 16 September – 20 October (ruptured back muscle)

The 2011 Novak Djokovic tennis season is widely regarded as one of the greatest seasons in men's tennis history. Djokovic ended the year with a 70–6 record, including an impressive 10–1 record against Rafael Nadal and Roger Federer, the other two best players of the year. From the start of the year, he went undefeated until the French Open semifinals in June (losing to Federer), compiling a 41-match winning streak. Djokovic won ten tournaments, of which three were major events: the Australian Open, Wimbledon Championships and the US Open. He won a then-record (later broken by himself) five Masters titles: Indian Wells, Miami and Canada, played on hard courts, and Madrid and Rome, on clay. Djokovic also won titles in Dubai and in Serbia.

Djokovic defeated Nadal (the previous season's No. 1 player) in six finals and reached the world No. 1 ranking for the first time on 4 July, maintaining the top ranking for the rest of the season. Among the six finals he defeated Nadal, two were on clay: a notable reversal due to the fact that he had lost all nine matches played against Nadal on clay prior to this season. He also set a new season record by winning $12.6 million USD in prize money on the ATP World Tour. Furthermore, he obtained a 21–4 record against top-10 and a 13–3 against Top-5 players.

== Year summary ==
=== Early Hardcourt events ===
==== Australian Open ====
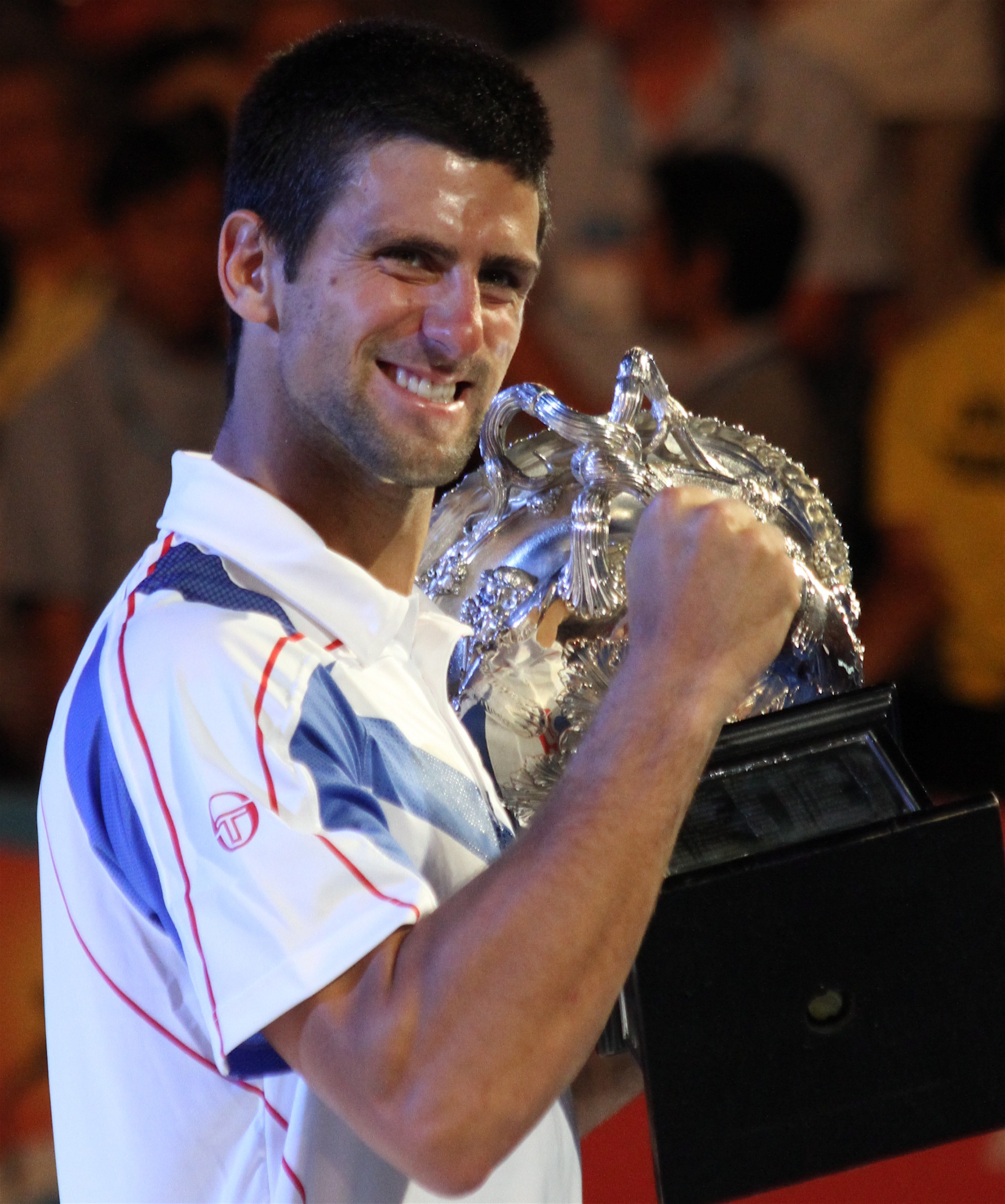
Djokovic hoisting the trophy

In the last week of January, Djokovic took on the four-time and reigning champion Roger Federer. The first set was won in a tiebreaker, which went to Djokovic in seven-points-to-three. In the second set, Djokovic took an early break of serve, when Federer overhit his backhand shot. But Djokovic let Federer gain control, and Federer broke twice to take a four-games-to-two lead. In a pivotal ninth game, Federer was serving for the set, but hit an ineffective drop shot that allowed Djokovic back into the set. In the eleventh game, Federer again lost serve, paving the way for Djokovic to go up two-sets-to-none. Federer broke Djokovic in the eighth game of the third set to level it at four-games all, but Djokovic broke again in the ninth game. This allowed Djokovic to serve out the match.

In the final, Djokovic took on Andy Murray, with Murray coming under serious duress in the second game, when he had to survive a 14-minute service game. Murray held serve at this key juncture, and the first set stayed on serve until the tenth game. During that crucial game, they were embroiled in a 39-shot tussle, which gave the relieved Serb a break point. Djokovic took the break of serve on the subsequent point, and captured the first set in a hard-fought 59 minutes. Djokovic quickly overcame the Briton in the second set to take a five-games-to-none advantage, which allowed him to take the set, only losing two games. Djokovic went on to win the third set, which allowed him to capture his second Australian Open title.

==== Dubai ====
In February in the Dubai final, Federer was unable to hold serve in the third game, allowing Djokovic to get the upper hand in the first set. In the second set, Federer was first to break, but he could not hold on to the advantage. Djokovic won the match.

==== Indian Wells Masters ====
In the first half of March, Djokovic met Federer in the semifinals of Indian Wells, and they split the opening two sets of the match. Djokovic quickly broke Federer's service in the third set, but had to stave off two break points on his own serve to go up two-games-to-love. The players traded breaks until Djokovic won the final four games to take the set and match. This win allowed Djokovic to move up to Number 2 in the ATP World Tour Rankings.

In the final, Djokovic faced Rafael Nadal for their first encounter of the season. The first set went to Nadal via two breaks of Djokovic's serve. In the second set, Djokovic was up five-games-to-three, and faced five deuces before taking the set. In the third set Djokovic took command and lost only two games to take victory, thus becoming only the third player to beat Nadal and Federer in the same tournament twice, after Nikolay Davydenko and David Nalbandian.

==== Miami Masters ====
In the second half of March, Djokovic met Nadal for the second time of the season in the finals yet again. Nadal quickly took a three-games-to-one advantage, and saved breakpoints to advance to five-games-to-one. Djokovic recovered a break but couldn't avoid losing the set. Djokovic started well in the second set, going up four-games-to-love. Djokovic won the second set to force a deciding third set. The final set was decided in a tiebreak. Djokovic got down early in the tiebreak, but recovered to win the match.

=== Clay court events ===
==== Serbia Open ====
In April in his hometown tournament Djokovic met Spaniard Feliciano López in the final of the Serbia Open in Belgrade. The first set went to a tiebreaker, which was won by Djokovic. Djokovic went on to the victory in the match, only losing two games in the second set.

==== Madrid Masters ====
In May in the final of the Madrid Masters, Djokovic took a four-games-to-love lead over Rafael Nadal, but Nadal came back to five-games-all. Djokovic was able to break again and took the opening set. Djokovic got broken in the opening service game of the second set, but came back to win the set and the match.

==== Rome Masters ====
Djokovic met Andy Murray in the semifinals of the Rome Masters. Djokovic went to a one-set lead. Murray took the second set with just one break of serve in the sixth game of the set. In the third set, Murray was serving for the match at five-games-to-four, but Djokovic broke back. The match was decided in a tiebreak, with Djokovic winning it.

Djokovic played Nadal in the finals. Djokovic failed to serve for the set after getting a break in the eighth game, but took the set after getting another break. The second set was very close, with Djokovic converting his fourth match point to win the title, his second Masters title on clay courts this year. Beating Nadal in back-to-back matches on clay was a notable reversal due to the fact that he had previously lost all nine matches played against Nadal on clay.

With this victory, Djokovic was the first player to qualify for the 2011 ATP World Tour Finals.

==== French Open ====
Djokovic met Roger Federer in the semifinals, marking the first time they faced at Roland Garros. Federer went into the match with a 13–9 lead in their head-to-head matchup as well as a 2–1 lead in their head-to-head on clay. The first set featured an exchange of breaks, with Federer taking the tiebreak when Djokovic hit a forehand into the net at 5–6. In the second set, Federer capitalized on an early break to take a two-set lead. Djokovic came back by winning the third set. The fourth set was close, with both players holding serve through the first eight games. In the ninth game, Djokovic finally managed to break and prepared to serve to level the match. Federer broke back. Djokovic had another break opportunity in the eleventh service game, but the set went into a tiebreak. Roger Federer finally sealed the match with an ace on his first match point. The loss marked Djokovic's first defeat of the season (with Federer also being the last man to defeat Djokovic in 2010), ending his chance to win the Calendar Year Grand Slam as well as a 43-match win streak, which included a record 41–0 start to 2011.

=== Grass court events ===
==== Wimbledon Championships ====
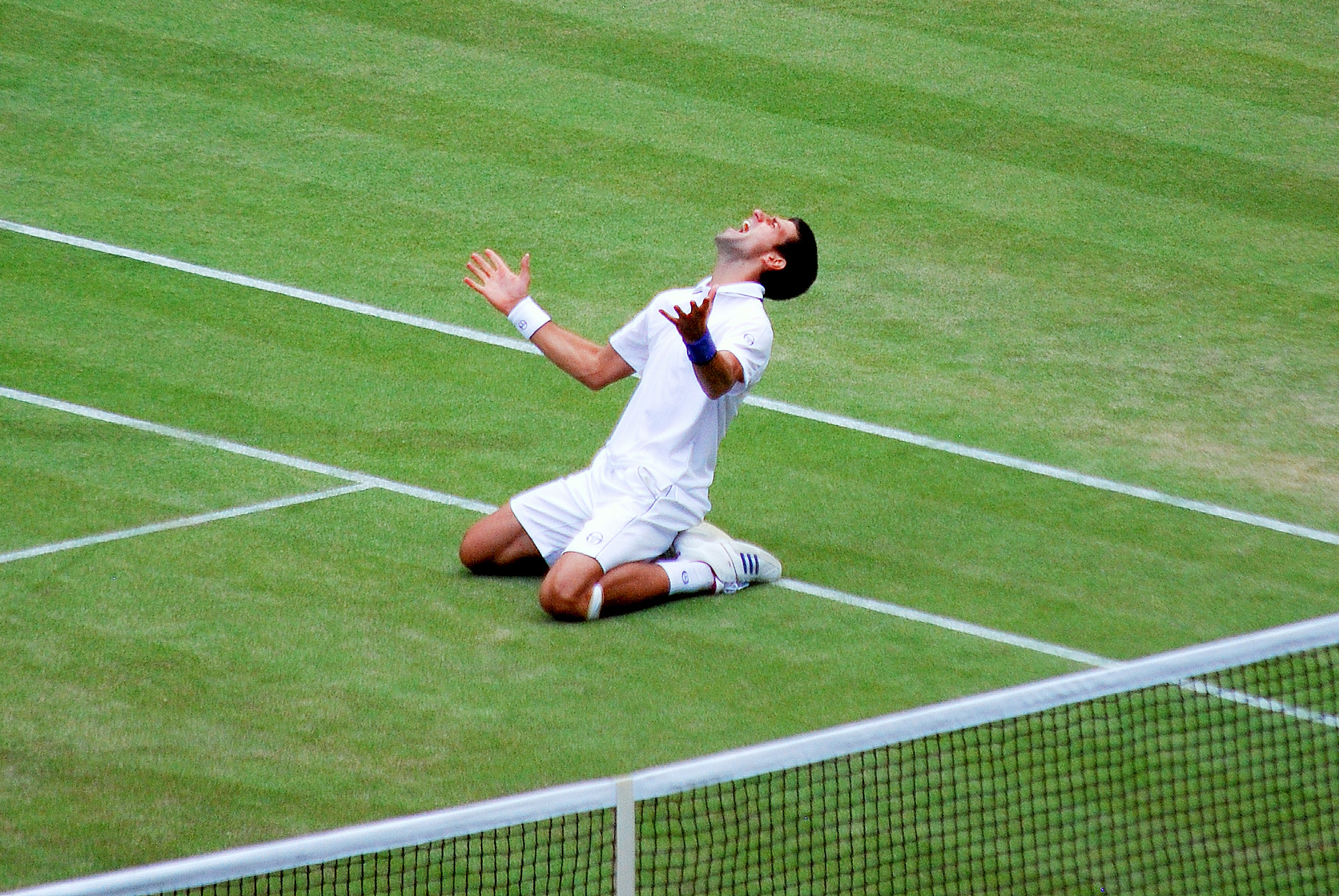
Djokovic at Wimbledon

In June, Djokovic took on Frenchman Jo-Wilfried Tsonga in the semifinals of Wimbledon. The match started out in an inauspicious way for Djokovic, as he was broken in his opening service game. Djokovic broke back in the tenth game, and went on to win the first set in a tiebreak. Djokovic also took the second set. The third set was an up-and-down affair with several breaks of serve, but also ended in a tiebreak. Tsonga took this third set. Next, Djokovic won the fourth set and the match. This win allowed Djokovic to take over the World Number 1 ranking from Rafael Nadal.

Djokovic met Nadal for their first meeting in a Wimbledon final. Djokovic took the first set with his first break in the match. The second and third sets were quite lopsided affairs. Djokovic took the second set, but Nadal hit back in the third set. At four-games-to-three in the fourth set, Djokovic managed to get the needed break of serve. Next, he served out the match to take his first Wimbledon title.

=== US Open Series events ===
==== Canada Masters ====
In the August US Open Series Djokovic played Mardy Fish in the final of the Canada Masters. Djokovic got off to a good start by winning the first set while losing only two games. In the fifth game of the second set, Djokovic lost his serve to Fish, who went on to take the set. In the third set, Djokovic was serving for the match at five-games-to-three, and took the match on his fourth match point. This was Djokovic's fifth Masters Series victory for the season, a record.

==== Cincinnati Masters ====
Djokovic faced Andy Murray in the finals. The match stayed on serve until the seventh game, when Murray got a break, allowing him to take the opening set. After Murray won the first three games in the second set, Djokovic retired from the match with a shoulder injury.

==== US Open ====
Djokovic met Federer in the US Open for the fifth year in a row, this time in the semi-finals. Federer took the first two sets, and Djokovic won the next two sets. In the decisive fifth set, Djokovic dropped his serve in the eighth game, allowing Federer to serve for the match. Federer got two match points, but Djokovic was able to save them and break back. With another break of serve, Djokovic won the match, thus becoming just the second player to beat Federer from two sets down after Tsonga a few months earlier in Wimbledon. Djokovic's crosscourt forehand return winner to save the first match point is widely regarded as one of the greatest shots in US Open history as well as one of the greatest returns in tennis history. This was the second consecutive US Open where Djokovic saved two match points against Federer to reach the final, and the fifth consecutive US Open where Djokovic and Federer played each other.

Djokovic played Nadal in the final, their second successive Major final, and their sixth encounter in a final for the season. The first two sets saw Nadal taking two-games-to-love leads. But on both occasions, Djokovic recovered to take a two sets lead. Djokovic was serving for the match in the twelfth game of the third set, but was broken by Nadal. Nadal took that set in a tiebreak. Despite receiving treatment early in the fourth set, Djokovic went on to win the match in four sets, taking his first US Open title.

=== Late Hardcourt events ===
With the victory, Djokovic extended his season record to an impressive 64–2. However, his level dropped toward the season's end, beginning with a back injury sustained during the US Open, losing to Kei Nishikori in the semifinals of the 2011 Swiss Indoors, and withdrawing against Jo-Wilfried Tsonga in the quarterfinals of the Paris Masters.

==== ATP World Tour Finals ====
Djokovic qualified for the ATP World Tour Finals for the fifth consecutive year. Novak was drawn into group A alongside Tomáš Berdych, David Ferrer and Andy Murray. He beat Berdych, lost to Ferrer in straights and then lost to replacement player Janko Tipsarević, who substituted Murray. With a 1–2 record in the round-robin stage he was eliminated from the tournament.

=== Davis Cup ===
In September, Djokovic missed the first rubber of the Davis Cup tie vs Argentina. He came back to play Juan Martín del Potro in the fourth rubber, and lost the first set, before withdrawing with injury midway through the second set. Serbia lost the tie.

=== Hopman Cup ===
In January Djokovic teamed up with Ana Ivanovic to represent Serbia in the Hopman Cup. They reached the final, but had to withdraw before the match because Ivanovic sustained an injury.

== Analysis ==
It is considered one of the best seasons in the history of tennis. It is considered one of Djokovic's two absolute best seasons, alongside his 2015 season. Pete Sampras hailed Djokovic's 2011 season as the best he has ever seen in his lifetime, calling it "one of the best achievements in all of sports." Boris Becker called Djokovic's season "one of the very best years in tennis of all time," adding that it "may not be the best statistically, but he's beaten Federer, he's beaten Nadal, he's beaten everybody that came around to challenge him in the biggest tournaments in the world." John McEnroe stated after Djokovic won the 2011 US Open final against Nadal that "Djokovic is having the greatest year in the history of our sport, there's no doubt about it." At the end of the season, Rafael Nadal, who went 0–6 against Djokovic, all in finals, stated that "It’s probably the highest level of tennis that I ever saw." Former world No. 7, Mardy Fish, declared in 2023 that 2011 Djokovic was the "best player of all time."

Djokovic was dominant against Federer and Nadal, the other two best players of 2011, going 10–1 against them. Noticeably, Nadal was coming off of his best season ever in 2010, and was in his prime, yet was unable to notch one win against Djokovic throughout the entire season, being handily beaten in six Big Title finals, and would have had a season statistically equal to, if not better than 2010 if not for Djokovic. This is confirmed by Nadal in 2016 who stated in an interview with Tennis Magazine that "In 2011, my problem was Djokovic because I was winning against everybody and losing against him in the finals." Noticeably, Nadal was beaten in straight sets at two clay Masters finals while in his prime on clay. Thus Djokovic's 2011 season is praised as the best by some, for his dominance and the high level of competition he faced, including dominating Nadal and Federer at or near their best.

Djokovic was praised for his exceptional movement and incredible athleticism shown throughout the season, along with his service having improved, along with the tremendous pressure he put on his opponents service games. His incredible ability at returning led him to having the season best return games won statistics (38.84%). He also had the season best return games won statistics on hardcourts (41.03%). He had the season best second serve return points won (57.54%). With that, he also had the season best second serve return points won on hardcourts (57.86%). With his incredible returning, he hit a return winner against Federer on Federer's first of two match points, both of which Djokovic saved, in the 2011 US Open semifinals, which has been praised as one of the best ever. It has been called "the single greatest shot in US Open history."

Justin Gimelstob attributed Djokovic's consistency to the improvement in his service game, particularly when it came to his second services, which was just one percent behind of those statistic leaders like Nadal and Federer. According to him Djokovic's strength derived from his agility, his backhand and his return of serve, which was the best on the 2011 tour.

== All matches ==
This table lists all the matches of Djokovic this year, including walkovers W/O (they are marked ND for non-decision)

Key
| W | F | SF | QF | #R | RR | Q# | P# | DNQ | A | Z# | PO | G | S | B | NMS | NTI | P | NH |

(W) winner; (F) finalist; (SF) semifinalist; (QF) quarterfinalist; (#R) rounds 4, 3, 2, 1; (RR) round-robin stage; (Q#) qualification round; (P#) preliminary round; (DNQ) did not qualify; (A) absent; (Z#) Davis/Fed Cup Zonal Group (with number indication) or (PO) play-off; (G) gold, (S) silver or (B) bronze Olympic/Paralympic medal; (NMS) not a Masters tournament; (NTI) not a Tier I tournament; (P) postponed; (NH) not held; (SR) strike rate (events won / competed); (W–L) win–loss record.
To avoid confusion and double counting, these charts are updated at the conclusion of a tournament or when the player's participation has ended.

=== Singles matches ===
| Tournament | # | Round | Opponent | Rank | Result | Score |
Australian Open; Melbourne, Australia; Grand Slam tournament Hard, outdoor 16 January 2011
| Australian Open; Melbourne, Australia; Grand Slam tournament Hard, outdoor 16 January 2011 | 1 / 430 | 1R | (Spain) Marcel Granollers | 42 | Win | 6–1, 6–3, 6–1 |
| Australian Open; Melbourne, Australia; Grand Slam tournament Hard, outdoor 16 January 2011 | 2 / 431 | 2R | (Croatia) Ivan Dodig | 81 | Win | 7–5, 6–7^{(8–10)}, 6–0, 6–2 |
| Australian Open; Melbourne, Australia; Grand Slam tournament Hard, outdoor 16 January 2011 | 3 / 432 | 3R | (Serbia) Viktor Troicki | 27 | Win | 6–2, Ret. |
| Australian Open; Melbourne, Australia; Grand Slam tournament Hard, outdoor 16 January 2011 | 4 / 433 | 4R | (Spain) Nicolás Almagro | 14 | Win | 6–3, 6–4, 6–0 |
| Australian Open; Melbourne, Australia; Grand Slam tournament Hard, outdoor 16 January 2011 | 5 / 434 | QF | (Czech Republic) Tomáš Berdych | 6 | Win | 6–1, 7–6^{(7–5)}, 6–1 |
| Australian Open; Melbourne, Australia; Grand Slam tournament Hard, outdoor 16 January 2011 | 6 / 435 | SF | (Switzerland) Roger Federer | 2 | Win | 7–6^{(7–3)}, 7–5, 6–4 |
| Australian Open; Melbourne, Australia; Grand Slam tournament Hard, outdoor 16 January 2011 | 7 / 436 | W | (United Kingdom) Andy Murray | 5 | Win (1) | 6–4, 6–2, 6–3 |
Dubai Tennis Championships; Dubai, United Arab Emirates; ATP World Tour 500; Hard, outdoor 21 February 2011
| Dubai Tennis Championships; Dubai, United Arab Emirates; ATP World Tour 500; Hard, outdoor 21 February 2011 | 8 / 437 | 1R | (France) Michaël Llodra | 27 | Win | 6–3, 6–3 |
| Dubai Tennis Championships; Dubai, United Arab Emirates; ATP World Tour 500; Hard, outdoor 21 February 2011 | 9 / 438 | 2R | (Spain) Feliciano López | 41 | Win | 6–3, 2–6, 6–4 |
| Dubai Tennis Championships; Dubai, United Arab Emirates; ATP World Tour 500; Hard, outdoor 21 February 2011 | 10 / 439 | QF | (Germany) Florian Mayer | 38 | Win | 7–5, 6–1 |
| Dubai Tennis Championships; Dubai, United Arab Emirates; ATP World Tour 500; Hard, outdoor 21 February 2011 | 11 / 440 | SF | (Czech Republic) Tomáš Berdych | 7 | Win | 6–7^{(5–7)}, 6–2, 4–2 Ret. |
| Dubai Tennis Championships; Dubai, United Arab Emirates; ATP World Tour 500; Hard, outdoor 21 February 2011 | 12 / 441 | W | (Switzerland) Roger Federer | 2 | Win (2) | 6–3, 6–3 |
BNP Paribas Open; Indian Wells, United States; ATP World Tour Masters 1000; Hard, outdoor 8 March 2011
| BNP Paribas Open; Indian Wells, United States; ATP World Tour Masters 1000; Hard, outdoor 8 March 2011 | | 1R | Bye | | | |
| BNP Paribas Open; Indian Wells, United States; ATP World Tour Masters 1000; Hard, outdoor 8 March 2011 | 13 / 442 | 2R | (Kazakhstan) Andrey Golubev | 39 | Win | 6–0, 6–4 |
| BNP Paribas Open; Indian Wells, United States; ATP World Tour Masters 1000; Hard, outdoor 8 March 2011 | 14 / 443 | 3R | (Latvia) Ernests Gulbis | 34 | Win | 6–0, 6–1 |
| BNP Paribas Open; Indian Wells, United States; ATP World Tour Masters 1000; Hard, outdoor 8 March 2011 | 15 / 444 | 4R | (Serbia) Viktor Troicki | 18 | Win | 6–0, 6–1 |
| BNP Paribas Open; Indian Wells, United States; ATP World Tour Masters 1000; Hard, outdoor 8 March 2011 | 16 / 445 | QF | (France) Richard Gasquet | 21 | Win | 6–2, 6–4 |
| BNP Paribas Open; Indian Wells, United States; ATP World Tour Masters 1000; Hard, outdoor 8 March 2011 | 17 / 446 | SF | (Switzerland) Roger Federer | 2 | Win | 6–3, 3–6, 6–2 |
| BNP Paribas Open; Indian Wells, United States; ATP World Tour Masters 1000; Hard, outdoor 8 March 2011 | 18 / 447 | W | (Spain) Rafael Nadal | 1 | Win (3) | 4–6, 6–3, 6–2 |
Sony Ericsson Open; Miami, United States; ATP World Tour Masters 1000; Hard, outdoor 23 March 2011
| Sony Ericsson Open; Miami, United States; ATP World Tour Masters 1000; Hard, outdoor 23 March 2011 | | 1R | Bye | | | |
| Sony Ericsson Open; Miami, United States; ATP World Tour Masters 1000; Hard, outdoor 23 March 2011 | 19 / 448 | 2R | (Uzbekistan) Denis Istomin | 54 | Win | 6–0, 6–1 |
| Sony Ericsson Open; Miami, United States; ATP World Tour Masters 1000; Hard, outdoor 23 March 2011 | 20 / 449 | 3R | (United States) James Blake | 173 | Win | 6–2, 6–0 |
| Sony Ericsson Open; Miami, United States; ATP World Tour Masters 1000; Hard, outdoor 23 March 2011 | 21 / 450 | 4R | (Serbia) Viktor Troicki | 17 | Win | 6–3, 6–2 |
| Sony Ericsson Open; Miami, United States; ATP World Tour Masters 1000; Hard, outdoor 23 March 2011 | 22 / 451 | QF | (South Africa) Kevin Anderson | 40 | Win | 6–4, 6–2 |
| Sony Ericsson Open; Miami, United States; ATP World Tour Masters 1000; Hard, outdoor 23 March 2011 | 23 / 452 | SF | (United States) Mardy Fish | 15 | Win | 6–3, 6–1 |
| Sony Ericsson Open; Miami, United States; ATP World Tour Masters 1000; Hard, outdoor 23 March 2011 | 24 / 453 | W | (Spain) Rafael Nadal | 1 | Win (4) | 4–6, 6–3, 7–6^{(7–4)} |
Serbia Open; Belgrade, Serbia; ATP World Tour 250; Clay, outdoor 25 April 2011
| Serbia Open; Belgrade, Serbia; ATP World Tour 250; Clay, outdoor 25 April 2011 | | 1R | Bye | | | |
| Serbia Open; Belgrade, Serbia; ATP World Tour 250; Clay, outdoor 25 April 2011 | 25 / 454 | 2R | (Romania) Adrian Ungur | 175 | Win | 6–2, 6–3 |
| Serbia Open; Belgrade, Serbia; ATP World Tour 250; Clay, outdoor 25 April 2011 | 26 / 455 | QF | (Slovenia) Blaž Kavčič | 85 | Win | 6–3, 6–2 |
| Serbia Open; Belgrade, Serbia; ATP World Tour 250; Clay, outdoor 25 April 2011 | | SF | (Serbia) Janko Tipsarević | 36 | W/O | N/A |
| Serbia Open; Belgrade, Serbia; ATP World Tour 250; Clay, outdoor 25 April 2011 | 27 / 456 | W | (Spain) Feliciano López | 37 | Win (5) | 7–6^{(7–4)}, 6–2 |
Mutua Madrid Open; Madrid, Spain; ATP World Tour Masters 1000; Clay, outdoor 1 May 2011
| Mutua Madrid Open; Madrid, Spain; ATP World Tour Masters 1000; Clay, outdoor 1 May 2011 | | 1R | Bye | | | |
| Mutua Madrid Open; Madrid, Spain; ATP World Tour Masters 1000; Clay, outdoor 1 May 2011 | 28 / 457 | 2R | (South Africa) Kevin Anderson | 35 | Win | 6–3, 6–4 |
| Mutua Madrid Open; Madrid, Spain; ATP World Tour Masters 1000; Clay, outdoor 1 May 2011 | 29 / 458 | 3R | (Spain) Guillermo García-López | 29 | Win | 6–1, 6–2 |
| Mutua Madrid Open; Madrid, Spain; ATP World Tour Masters 1000; Clay, outdoor 1 May 2011 | 30 / 459 | QF | (Spain) David Ferrer | 6 | Win | 6–4, 4–6, 6–3 |
| Mutua Madrid Open; Madrid, Spain; ATP World Tour Masters 1000; Clay, outdoor 1 May 2011 | 31 / 460 | SF | (Brazil) Thomaz Bellucci | 36 | Win | 4–6, 6–4, 6–1 |
| Mutua Madrid Open; Madrid, Spain; ATP World Tour Masters 1000; Clay, outdoor 1 May 2011 | 32 / 461 | W | (Spain) Rafael Nadal | 1 | Win (6) | 7–5, 6–4 |
Internazionali BNL d'Italia; Rome, Italy; ATP World Tour Masters 1000; Clay, outdoor 8 May 2011
| Internazionali BNL d'Italia; Rome, Italy; ATP World Tour Masters 1000; Clay, outdoor 8 May 2011 | | 1R | Bye | | | |
| Internazionali BNL d'Italia; Rome, Italy; ATP World Tour Masters 1000; Clay, outdoor 8 May 2011 | 33 / 462 | 2R | (Poland) Łukasz Kubot | 141 | Win | 6–0, 6–3 |
| Internazionali BNL d'Italia; Rome, Italy; ATP World Tour Masters 1000; Clay, outdoor 8 May 2011 | 34 / 463 | 3R | (Switzerland) Stanislas Wawrinka | 14 | Win | 6–4, 6–1 |
| Internazionali BNL d'Italia; Rome, Italy; ATP World Tour Masters 1000; Clay, outdoor 8 May 2011 | 35 / 464 | QF | (Sweden) Robin Söderling | 5 | Win | 6–3, 6–0 |
| Internazionali BNL d'Italia; Rome, Italy; ATP World Tour Masters 1000; Clay, outdoor 8 May 2011 | 36 / 465 | SF | (United Kingdom) Andy Murray | 4 | Win | 6–1, 3–6, 7–6^{(7–2)} |
| Internazionali BNL d'Italia; Rome, Italy; ATP World Tour Masters 1000; Clay, outdoor 8 May 2011 | 37 / 466 | W | (Spain) Rafael Nadal | 1 | Win (7) | 6–4, 6–4 |
| French Open; Paris, France; Grand Slam tournament Clay, outdoor 17 May 2011 | 38 / 467 | 1R | (Netherlands) Thiemo de Bakker | 71 | Win | 6–2, 6–1, 6–3 |
| French Open; Paris, France; Grand Slam tournament Clay, outdoor 17 May 2011 | 39 / 468 | 2R | (Romania) Victor Hănescu | 60 | Win | 6–4, 6–1, 2–3 Ret. |
| French Open; Paris, France; Grand Slam tournament Clay, outdoor 17 May 2011 | 40 / 469 | 3R | (Argentina) Juan Martín del Potro | 26 | Win | 6–3, 3–6, 6–3, 6–2 |
| French Open; Paris, France; Grand Slam tournament Clay, outdoor 17 May 2011 | 41 / 470 | 4R | (France) Richard Gasquet | 16 | Win | 6–4, 6–4, 6–2 |
| French Open; Paris, France; Grand Slam tournament Clay, outdoor 17 May 2011 | | QF | (Italy) Fabio Fognini | 49 | W/O | N/A |
| French Open; Paris, France; Grand Slam tournament Clay, outdoor 17 May 2011 | 42 / 471 | SF | (Switzerland) Roger Federer | 3 | Loss | 6–7^{(5–7)}, 3–6, 6–3, 6–7^{(5–7)} |
Wimbledon Championships; London, Great Britain; Grand Slam tournament Grass, outdoor 20 June 2011
| Wimbledon Championships; London, Great Britain; Grand Slam tournament Grass, outdoor 20 June 2011 | 43 / 472 | 1R | (France) Jérémy Chardy | 54 | Win | 6–4, 6–1, 6–1 |
| Wimbledon Championships; London, Great Britain; Grand Slam tournament Grass, outdoor 20 June 2011 | 44 / 473 | 2R | (South Africa) Kevin Anderson | 36 | Win | 6–3, 6–4, 6–2 |
| Wimbledon Championships; London, Great Britain; Grand Slam tournament Grass, outdoor 20 June 2011 | 45 / 474 | 3R | (Cyprus) Marcos Baghdatis | 30 | Win | 6–4, 4–6, 6–3, 6–4 |
| Wimbledon Championships; London, Great Britain; Grand Slam tournament Grass, outdoor 20 June 2011 | 46 / 475 | 4R | (France) Michaël Llodra | 35 | Win | 6–3, 6–3, 6–3 |
| Wimbledon Championships; London, Great Britain; Grand Slam tournament Grass, outdoor 20 June 2011 | 47 / 476 | QF | (Australia) Bernard Tomic | 158 | Win | 6–2, 3–6, 6–3, 7–5 |
| Wimbledon Championships; London, Great Britain; Grand Slam tournament Grass, outdoor 20 June 2011 | 48 / 477 | SF | (France) Jo-Wilfried Tsonga | 19 | Win | 7–6^{(7–4)}, 6–2, 6–7^{(9–11)}, 6–3 |
| Wimbledon Championships; London, Great Britain; Grand Slam tournament Grass, outdoor 20 June 2011 | 49 / 478 | W | (Spain) Rafael Nadal | 1 | Win (8) | 6–4, 6–1, 1–6, 6–3 |
| Rogers Cup; Montreal, Canada; ATP World Tour Masters 1000; Hard, outdoor 8 August 2011 | | 1R | Bye | | | |
| Rogers Cup; Montreal, Canada; ATP World Tour Masters 1000; Hard, outdoor 8 August 2011 | 50 / 479 | 2R | (Russia) Nikolay Davydenko | 30 | Win | 7–5, 6–1 |
| Rogers Cup; Montreal, Canada; ATP World Tour Masters 1000; Hard, outdoor 8 August 2011 | 51 / 480 | 3R | (Croatia) Marin Čilić | 29 | Win | 7–5, 6–2 |
| Rogers Cup; Montreal, Canada; ATP World Tour Masters 1000; Hard, outdoor 8 August 2011 | 52 / 481 | QF | (France) Gaël Monfils | 7 | Win | 6–2, 6–1 |
| Rogers Cup; Montreal, Canada; ATP World Tour Masters 1000; Hard, outdoor 8 August 2011 | 53 / 482 | SF | (France) Jo-Wilfried Tsonga | 16 | Win | 6–4, 3–0 Ret. |
| Rogers Cup; Montreal, Canada; ATP World Tour Masters 1000; Hard, outdoor 8 August 2011 | 54 / 483 | W | (United States) Mardy Fish | 8 | Win (9) | 6–2, 3–6, 6–4 |
| Western & Southern Open; Cincinnati, United States; ATP World Tour Masters 1000; Hard, outdoor 15 August 2011 | | 1R | Bye | | | |
| Western & Southern Open; Cincinnati, United States; ATP World Tour Masters 1000; Hard, outdoor 15 August 2011 | 55 / 484 | 2R | (United States) Ryan Harrison | 78 | Win | 6–2, 6–3 |
| Western & Southern Open; Cincinnati, United States; ATP World Tour Masters 1000; Hard, outdoor 15 August 2011 | 56 / 485 | 3R | (Czech Republic) Radek Štěpánek | 29 | Win | 6–3, 6–3 |
| Western & Southern Open; Cincinnati, United States; ATP World Tour Masters 1000; Hard, outdoor 15 August 2011 | 57 / 486 | QF | (France) Gaël Monfils | 8 | Win | 3–6, 6–4, 6–3 |
| Western & Southern Open; Cincinnati, United States; ATP World Tour Masters 1000; Hard, outdoor 15 August 2011 | 58 / 487 | SF | (Czech Republic) Tomáš Berdych | 9 | Win | 7–5 Ret. |
| Western & Southern Open; Cincinnati, United States; ATP World Tour Masters 1000; Hard, outdoor 15 August 2011 | 59 / 488 | F | (United Kingdom) Andy Murray | 4 | Loss (1) | 4–6, 0–3 Ret. |
US Open; New York City, United States; Grand Slam tournament Hard, outdoor 29 August 2011
| US Open; New York City, United States; Grand Slam tournament Hard, outdoor 29 August 2011 | 60 / 489 | 1R | (Republic of Ireland) Conor Niland | 197 | Win | 6–0, 5–1 Ret. |
| US Open; New York City, United States; Grand Slam tournament Hard, outdoor 29 August 2011 | 61 / 490 | 2R | (Argentina) Carlos Berlocq | 74 | Win | 6–0, 6–0, 6–2 |
| US Open; New York City, United States; Grand Slam tournament Hard, outdoor 29 August 2011 | 62 / 491 | 3R | (Russia) Nikolay Davydenko | 39 | Win | 6–3, 6–4, 6–2 |
| US Open; New York City, United States; Grand Slam tournament Hard, outdoor 29 August 2011 | 63 / 492 | 4R | (Ukraine) Alexandr Dolgopolov | 23 | Win | 7–6^{(16–14)}, 6–4, 6–2 |
| US Open; New York City, United States; Grand Slam tournament Hard, outdoor 29 August 2011 | 64 / 493 | QF | (Serbia) Janko Tipsarević | 20 | Win | 7–6^{(7–2)}, 6–7^{(3–7)}, 6–0, 3–0 Ret. |
| US Open; New York City, United States; Grand Slam tournament Hard, outdoor 29 August 2011 | 65 / 494 | SF | (Switzerland) Roger Federer | 3 | Win | 6–7^{(7–9)}, 4–6, 6–3, 6–2, 7–5 |
| US Open; New York City, United States; Grand Slam tournament Hard, outdoor 29 August 2011 | 66 / 495 | W | (Spain) Rafael Nadal | 2 | Win (10) | 6–2, 6–4, 6–7^{(3–7)}, 6–1 |
| Davis Cup World Group Semifinals: Serbia vs. Argentina; Belgrade, Serbia; Davis Cup; Hard, indoor 16 September 2011 | 67 / 496 | SF; R4 | (Argentina) Juan Martín del Potro | 17 | Loss | 6–7^{(5–7)}, 0–3 Ret. |
Swiss Indoors; Basel, Switzerland; ATP World Tour 500; Hard, indoor 31 October 2011
| Swiss Indoors; Basel, Switzerland; ATP World Tour 500; Hard, indoor 31 October 2011 | 68 / 497 | 1R | (Belgium) Xavier Malisse | 47 | Win | 6–2, 4–6, 7–5 |
| Swiss Indoors; Basel, Switzerland; ATP World Tour 500; Hard, indoor 31 October 2011 | 69 / 498 | 2R | (Poland) Łukasz Kubot | 64 | Win | 6–1, 6–2 |
| Swiss Indoors; Basel, Switzerland; ATP World Tour 500; Hard, indoor 31 October 2011 | 70 / 499 | QF | (Cyprus) Marcos Baghdatis | 59 | Win | 2–6, 6–2, 6–3 |
| Swiss Indoors; Basel, Switzerland; ATP World Tour 500; Hard, indoor 31 October 2011 | 71 / 500 | SF | (Japan) Kei Nishikori | 32 | Loss | 6–2, 6–7^{(4–7)}, 0–6 |
| BNP Paribas Masters; Paris, France; ATP World Tour Masters 1000; Hard, indoor 7 November 2011 | | 1R | Bye | | | |
| BNP Paribas Masters; Paris, France; ATP World Tour Masters 1000; Hard, indoor 7 November 2011 | 72 / 501 | 2R | (Croatia) Ivan Dodig | 39 | Win | 6–4, 6–3 |
| BNP Paribas Masters; Paris, France; ATP World Tour Masters 1000; Hard, indoor 7 November 2011 | 73 / 502 | 3R | (Serbia) Viktor Troicki | 17 | Win | 4–6, 6–3, 6–1 |
| BNP Paribas Masters; Paris, France; ATP World Tour Masters 1000; Hard, indoor 7 November 2011 | | QF | (France) Jo-Wilfried Tsonga | 8 | W/O | N/A |
| ATP World Tour Finals; London, United Kingdom; ATP World Tour Finals (1500); Hard, indoor 20 November 2011 | 74 / 503 | RR | (Czech Republic) Tomáš Berdych | 7 | Win | 3–6, 6–3, 7–6^{(7–3)} |
| ATP World Tour Finals; London, United Kingdom; ATP World Tour Finals (1500); Hard, indoor 20 November 2011 | 75 / 504 | RR | (Spain) David Ferrer | 5 | Loss | 3–6, 1–6 |
| ATP World Tour Finals; London, United Kingdom; ATP World Tour Finals (1500); Hard, indoor 20 November 2011 | 76 / 505 | RR | (Serbia) Janko Tipsarević | 9 | Loss | 6–3, 3–6, 3–6 |

- Source

=== Doubles matches ===
| Tournament | Match | Round | Opponents | Rank | Team rank | Result | Score |
Dubai Tennis Championships; Dubai, United Arab Emirates; ATP World Tour 500; Hard, outdoor 21 February 2011; Partner: (Serbia) Marko Djokovic
| Dubai Tennis Championships; Dubai, United Arab Emirates; ATP World Tour 500; Hard, outdoor 21 February 2011; Partner: (Serbia) Marko Djokovic | 1 / 67 | 1R | (India) Mahesh Bhupathi (India) Leander Paes | 5; 7 | 2 | Loss | 4–6, 1–6 |
BNP Paribas Open; Indian Wells, California, USA; ATP World Tour Masters 1000; Hard, outdoor 8 March 2011; Partner: (Serbia) Victor Troicki
| BNP Paribas Open; Indian Wells, California, USA; ATP World Tour Masters 1000; Hard, outdoor 8 March 2011; Partner: (Serbia) Victor Troicki | 2 / 68 | 1R | (Argentina) Juan Ignacio Chela (Argentina) Juan Mónaco | 46; 144 | – | Win | 6–3, 7–5 |
| BNP Paribas Open; Indian Wells, California, USA; ATP World Tour Masters 1000; Hard, outdoor 8 March 2011; Partner: (Serbia) Victor Troicki | 3 / 69 | 2R | (Poland) Łukasz Kubot (Austria) Oliver Marach | 15; 12 | 9 | Win | 6–2, 4–6, [10–7] |
| BNP Paribas Open; Indian Wells, California, USA; ATP World Tour Masters 1000; Hard, outdoor 8 March 2011; Partner: (Serbia) Victor Troicki | 4 / 70 | QF | (India) Rohan Bopanna (Pakistan) Aisam-ul-Haq Qureshi | 19; 20 | 15 | Loss | 1–6, 6–7^{(5–7)} |
Sony Ericsson Open; Miami, Florida, USA; ATP World Tour Masters 1000; Hard, outdoor 23 March 2011; Partner: (United Kingdom) Andy Murray
| Sony Ericsson Open; Miami, Florida, USA; ATP World Tour Masters 1000; Hard, outdoor 23 March 2011; Partner: (United Kingdom) Andy Murray | 5 / 71 | 1R | (Ukraine) Sergiy Stakhovsky (Russia) Mikhail Youzhny | 37; 40 | 15 | Loss | 7–5, 3–6, [8–10] |
| Davis Cup World Group; Quarterfinals: Sweden vs. Serbia; Halmstad, Sweden; Davis Cup; Hard, indoor 9 July 2011; Partner: Nenad Zimonjić | 6 / 72 | QF; R3 | (Sweden) Simon Aspelin (Sweden) Robert Lindstedt | 54; 14 | 162 | Loss | 4–6, 6–7^{(5–7)}, 5–7 |
| Rogers Cup; Montreal, Canada; ATP World Tour Masters 1000; Hard, outdoor 8 August 2011; Partner: (Serbia) Janko Tipsarević | 7 / 73 | 1R | (The Bahamas) Mark Knowles (Germany) Philipp Petzschner | 30; 23 | – | Win | 5–7, 6–3, [12–10] |
| Rogers Cup; Montreal, Canada; ATP World Tour Masters 1000; Hard, outdoor 8 August 2011; Partner: (Serbia) Janko Tipsarević | 8 / 74 | 2R | (Poland) Mariusz Fyrstenberg (Poland) Marcin Matkowski | 15; 15 | 16 | Loss | 6–3, 6–7^{(4–7)}, [5–10] |

- Source

=== Hopman Cup matches ===
==== Singles ====
| Tournament | Tie | Round | Opponent | Result | Score |
| Hopman Cup; Perth, Australia'; Hard, indoor 1 January 2011 | 1 | RR | (Kazakhstan) Andrey Golubev | Win | 4–6, 6–3, 6–1 |
| Hopman Cup; Perth, Australia'; Hard, indoor 1 January 2011 | 2 | RR | (Australia) Lleyton Hewitt | Win | 6–2, 6–4 |
| Hopman Cup; Perth, Australia'; Hard, indoor 1 January 2011 | 3 | RR | (Belgium) Ruben Bemelmans | Win | 6–3, 6–2 |

==== Mixed doubles ====
| Tournament | Tie | Round | Opponent woman partner | Opponent men partner | Result | Score |
| Hopman Cup; Perth, Australia; Hard, indoor 1 January 2011; Partner: (Serbia) Ana Ivanovic | 1 | RR | (Kazakhstan) Yaroslava Shvedova | (Kazakhstan) Andrey Golubev | Win | 7–6^{(7–2)}, 6–4 |
| Hopman Cup; Perth, Australia; Hard, indoor 1 January 2011; Partner: (Serbia) Ana Ivanovic | 2 | RR | (Australia) Alicia Molik | (Australia) Lleyton Hewitt | Win | 6–7^{(5–7)}, 7–5, [10–6] |
| Hopman Cup; Perth, Australia; Hard, indoor 1 January 2011; Partner: (Serbia) Ana Ivanovic | 3 | RR | (Belgium) Justine Henin | (Belgium) Ruben Bemelmans | Loss | 6–3, 4–6, [4–10] |

== Tournament schedule ==
=== Singles schedule ===
| Date | Tournament | City | Category | Surface | 2010 result | 2010 points | 2011 points | Outcome |
|---|---|---|---|---|---|---|---|---|
| 17.01.2011–30.01.2011 | Australian Open | Melbourne | Grand Slam | Hard | QF | 360 | 2000 | Winner (def. Andy Murray, 6–4, 6–2, 6–3) |
| 07.02.2011–13.02.2011 | ABN AMRO Tournament | Rotterdam | ATP World Tour 500 | Hard (i) | SF | 180 | 0 | Withdrew |
| 21.02.2011–27.02.2011 | Dubai Tennis Championships | Dubai | ATP World Tour 500 | Hard | W | 500 | 500 | Winner (def. Roger Federer, 6–3, 6–3) |
| 07.03.2011–20.03.2011 | BNP Paribas Open | Indian Wells | ATP Masters 1000 | Hard | 4R | 90 | 1000 | Winner (def. Rafael Nadal, 4–6, 6–3, 6–2) |
| 21.03.2011–03.04.2011 | Sony Ericsson Open | Miami | ATP Masters 1000 | Hard | 2R | 10 | 1000 | Winner (def. Rafael Nadal, 4–6, 6–3, 7–6^{(7–4)}) |
| 11.04.2011–17.04.2011 | Monte-Carlo Rolex Masters | France | ATP Masters 1000 | Clay | SF | 360 | 0 | Withdrew |
| 25.04.2011–01.05.2011 | Serbia Open | Belgrade | ATP World Tour 250 | Clay | QF | 45 | 250 | Winner (def. Feliciano López, 7–6^{(7–4)}, 6–2) |
| 02.05.2011–08.05.2011 | Mutua Madrid Open | Madrid | ATP Masters 1000 | Clay | DNS | 0 | 1000 | Winner (def. Rafael Nadal, 7–5, 6–4) |
| 09.05.2011–15.05.2011 | Internazionali BNL d'Italia | Rome | ATP Masters 1000 | Clay | QF | 180 | 1000 | Winner (def. Rafael Nadal, 6–4, 6–4) |
| 23.05.2011–05.06.2011 | French Open | Paris | Grand Slam | Clay | QF | 360 | 720 | Semifinals (lost to R Federer, 6–7^{(5–7)}, 3–6, 6–3, 6–7^{(5–7)}) |
| 06.06.2011–12.06.2011 | Aegon Championships | London | ATP World Tour 250 | Grass | 3R | 20 | 0 | Withdrew |
| 20.06.2011–03.07.2011 | Wimbledon | London | Grand Slam | Grass | SF | 720 | 2000 | Winner (def. Rafael Nadal, 6–4, 6–1, 1–6, 6–3) |
| 08.08.2011–14.08.2011 | Rogers Cup | Montreal | ATP Masters 1000 | Hard | SF | 360 | 1000 | Winner (def. Mardy Fish, 6–2, 3–6, 6–4) |
| 15.08.2011–21.08.2011 | Western & Southern Open | Cincinnati | ATP Masters 1000 | Hard | QF | 180 | 600 | Final (lost to Andy Murray, 4–6, 0–3 Ret.) |
| 29.08.2011–12.09.2011 | US Open | New York | Grand Slam | Hard | F | 1200 | 2000 | Winner (def. Rafael Nadal, 6–2, 6–4, 6–7^{(3–7)}, 6–1) |
| 16.09.2011–18.09.2011 | Davis Cup: Serbia vs Argentina | Belgrade | Davis Cup | Hard (i) | W | 280 | 0 | Semifinals: Argentina def. Serbia 3–2 (lost to Juan Martín del Potro, 6–7^{(5–7)}, 0–3 Ret.) |
| 03.10.2011–09.10.2011 | China Open | Beijing | ATP World Tour 500 | Hard | F | 500 | 0 | Withdrew |
| 10.10.2011–16.10.2011 | Shanghai Rolex Masters | Shanghai | ATP Masters 1000 | Hard | SF | 360 | 0 | Withdrew |
| 30.10.2011–06.11.2011 | Swiss Indoors | Basel | ATP World Tour 500 | Hard (i) | F | 300 | 180 | Semifinals (lost to Kei Nishikori, 6–2, 6–7^{(4–7)}, 0–6) |
| 07.11.2011–13.11.2011 | BNP Paribas Masters | Paris | ATP Masters 1000 | Hard (i) | 3R | 90 | 180 | Quarterfinals (withdrew against Jo-Wilfried Tsonga) |
| 20.11.2011–27.11.2011 | ATP World Tour Finals | London | ATP World Tour Finals | Hard (i) | SF | 400 | 200 | Round Robin (def. Tomáš Berdych, 3–6, 6–3, 7–6^{(7–3)}) (lost to David Ferrer, 3–6, 1–6) (lost to Janko Tipsarević, 6–3, 3–6, 3–6) |
| 02.12.2011–04.12.2011 | Davis Cup: Spain vs Argentina | Seville | Davis Cup | Clay (i) | W | 225 | 0 | Failed to qualify and defend title Final: Spain def. Argentina 3–1 |
| Total year-end points | | | | | | 6240 | 13630 | ▲7390 difference |

NOTE: In 2010 season total year-end points from ABN AMRO Tournament and Aegon Championships were not counted, as well as those from First Round, Quarterfinals and Semifinals of Davis Cup.

=== Doubles schedule ===
| Date | Tournament | City | Category | Surface | 2010 result | 2010 points | 2011 points | Outcome |
|---|---|---|---|---|---|---|---|---|
| 21.02.2011–27.02.2011 | Dubai Tennis Championships | Dubai | ATP World Tour 500 | Hard | 1R | (0) | (0) | First round (lost to Bhupathi/Paes, 4–6, 1–6) |
| 07.03.2011–20.03.2011 | BNP Paribas Open | Indian Wells | ATP Masters 1000 | Hard | DNS | 0 | 180 | Quarterfinals (lost to Bopanna/Qureshi, 1–6, 6–7^{(5–7)}) |
| 21.03.2011–03.04.2011 | Sony Ericsson Open | Miami | ATP Masters 1000 | Hard | DNS | 0 | (0) | First round (lost to Stakhovsky/Youzhny, 7–5, 3–6, [8–10]) |
| 11.04.2011–17.04.2011 | Monte-Carlo Rolex Masters | France | ATP Masters 1000 | Clay | 2R | 90 | 0 | Withdrew |
| 06.06.2011–12.06.2011 | Aegon Championships | London | ATP World Tour 250 | Grass | W | 250 | 0 | Withdrew |
| 08.06.2011–10.06.2011 | Davis Cup: Sweden vs. Serbia | Halmstad | Davis Cup | Hard (i) | SF | (0) | (0) | Quarterfinals: Serbia def. Sweden 4–1 (lost to Aspelin/Lindstedt, 4–6, 6–7^{(5–7)}, 5–7) |
| 08.08.2011–14.08.2011 | Rogers Cup | Montreal | ATP Masters 1000 | Hard | 1R | (0) | 90 | Second round (lost to Fyrstenberg/Matkowski, 6–3, 6–7^{(4–7)}, [5–10]) |
| 10.10.2011–16.10.2011 | Shanghai Rolex Masters | Shanghai | ATP Masters 1000 | Hard | 2R | 90 | 0 | Withdrew |
| Total year-end points | | | | | | 430 | 270 | ▼160 difference |

== Yearly records ==
=== Head-to-Head matchups ===
Novak Djokovic has a 21–4 record against the top 10, 34–2 against the top 50, and 14–0 against other players.

Ordered by number of wins (Bolded number marks a top 10 player at the time of match, Italic means top 50)

- **(Spain) Rafael Nadal** 6–0
- **(Czech Republic) Tomáš Berdych** 4–0
- (Serbia) Viktor Troicki 4–0
- **(Switzerland) Roger Federer** 4–1
- (South Africa) Kevin Anderson 3–0
- (Cyprus) Marcos Baghdatis 2–0
- (Russia) Nikolay Davydenko 2–0
- (Croatia) Ivan Dodig 2–0
- **(United States) Mardy Fish** 2–0
- (France) Richard Gasquet 2–0
- (Poland) Łukasz Kubot 2–0
- (France) Michaël Llodra 2–0
- (Spain) Feliciano López 2–0
- **(France) Gaël Monfils** 2–0
- (France) Jo-Wilfried Tsonga 2–0
- **(United Kingdom) Andy Murray** 2–1
- (Spain) Nicolás Almagro 1–0
- (Netherlands) Thiemo de Bakker 1–0
- (Brazil) Thomaz Bellucci 1–0
- (Argentina) Carlos Berlocq 1–0
- (United States) James Blake 1–0
- (France) Jérémy Chardy 1–0
- (Croatia) Marin Čilić 1–0
- (Ukraine) Alexandr Dolgopolov 1–0
- (Kazakhstan) Andrey Golubev 1–0
- (Spain) Marcel Granollers 1–0
- (Latvia) Ernests Gulbis 1–0
- (Romania) Victor Hănescu 1–0
- (United States) Ryan Harrison 1–0
- (Uzbekistan) Denis Istomin 1–0
- (Slovenia) Blaž Kavčič 1–0
- (Spain) Guillermo García-López 1–0
- (Belgium) Xavier Malisse 1–0
- (Republic of Ireland) Conor Niland 1–0
- (Germany) Florian Mayer 1–0
- **(Sweden) Robin Söderling** 1–0
- (Czech Republic) Radek Štěpánek 1–0
- (Australia) Bernard Tomic 1–0
- (Romania) Adrian Ungur 1–0
- (Switzerland) Stanislas Wawrinka 1–0
- **(Serbia) Janko Tipsarević** 1–1
- (Argentina) Juan Martín del Potro 1–1
- **(Spain) David Ferrer** 1–1
- (Japan) Kei Nishikori 0–1

=== Finals ===
==== Singles: 11 (10 titles, 1 runner-up) ====
Category
Grand Slam (3–0)
ATP World Tour Finals (0–0)
ATP World Tour Masters 1000 (5–1)
ATP World Tour 500 (1–0)
ATP World Tour 250 (1–0)

Titles by surface
Hard (6–1)
Clay (3–0)
Grass (1–0)

Titles by conditions
Outdoors (10–1)
Indoors (0–0)

| Outcome | No. | Date | Tournament | Surface | Opponent in the final | Score in the final |
|---|---|---|---|---|---|---|
| Winner | 19. | 30 January 2011 | Australian Open, Melbourne (2) | Hard | (United Kingdom) Andy Murray | 6–4, 6–2, 6–3 |
| Winner | 20. | 26 February 2011 | Dubai Tennis Championships, Dubai (3) | Hard | (Switzerland) Roger Federer | 6–3, 6–3 |
| Winner | 21. | 20 March 2011 | BNP Paribas Open, Indian Wells (2) | Hard | (Spain) Rafael Nadal | 4–6, 6–3, 6–2 |
| Winner | 22. | 3 April 2011 | Sony Ericsson Open, Miami (2) | Hard | (Spain) Rafael Nadal | 4–6, 6–3, 7–6^{(7–4)} |
| Winner | 23. | 1 May 2011 | Serbia Open, Belgrade (2) | Clay | (Spain) Feliciano López | 7–6^{(7–4)}, 6–2 |
| Winner | 24. | 8 May 2011 | Mutua Madrid Open, Madrid | Clay | (Spain) Rafael Nadal | 7–5, 6–4 |
| Winner | 25. | 15 May 2011 | Internazionali BNL d'Italia, Rome (2) | Clay | (Spain) Rafael Nadal | 6–4, 6–4 |
| Winner | 26. | 3 July 2011 | Wimbledon Championships, London | Grass | (Spain) Rafael Nadal | 6–4, 6–1, 1–6, 6–3 |
| Winner | 27. | 14 August 2011 | Rogers Cup, Montreal (2) | Hard | (United States) Mardy Fish | 6–2, 3–6, 6–4 |
| Runner-up | 14. | 21 August 2011 | Western & Southern Open, Cincinnati (3) | Hard | (United Kingdom) Andy Murray | 4–6, 0–3 Ret. |
| Winner | 28. | 12 September 2011 | US Open, New York City | Hard | (Spain) Rafael Nadal | 6–2, 6–4, 6–7^{(3–7)}, 6–1 |

=== Earnings ===
Novak Djokovic earned a record-breaking $12.6 million throughout the season.

- **Bold** font denotes tournament win

| # | Venue | Prize Money | Year-to-date |
|---|---|---|---|
| 1 | **Australian Open** | **$2,110,000** | $2,110,000^{[a]} |
| 2 | **Dubai Tennis Championships** | **$386,000** | $2,496,000 |
| 3 | **BNP Paribas Open** | **$611,000** | $3,107,000 |
| 4 | **Sony Ericsson Open** | **$611,000** | $3,718,000 |
| 5 | **Serbia Open** | **$93,950** | $3,811,950^{[b]} |
| 6 | **Mutua Madrid Open** | **$936,500** | $4,748,450^{[b]} |
| 7 | **Internazionali BNL d'Italia** | **$803,450** | $5,551,900^{[b]} |
| 8 | French Open | $425,000 | $5,976,900^{[b]} |
| 9 | **Wimbledon Championships** | **$1,800,000** | $7,776,900 |
| 10 | **Rogers Cup** | **$450,000** | $8,226,900 |
| 11 | Western & Southern Open | $243,200 | $8,470,100 |
| 12 | **US Open** | **$2,300,000** | $10,770,100 |
| 13 | Swiss Indoors | $93,412 | $10,863,512^{[b]} |
| 14 | BNP Paribas Masters | $78,609 | $10,942,121^{[b]} |
| 15 | ATP World Tour Finals | $120,000 | $11,062,121 |
| Masters Bonus | | $1,600,000 | $12,662,121 |
| Doubles | | $23,900 | $12,686,021 |
| Hopman Cup | | $52,750 | $12,738,771^{[a]} |
| ATP Finals participation fee | | $120,000 | $12,858,771 |
| World Tennis Championship exhibition | | $250,000 | $13,108,771 |
as of December 31, 2011

=== Awards and nominations ===
- ATP Player of the Year
- ITF World Champion
- BBC Overseas Sports Personality of the Year
- United States Sports Academy Male Athlete of the Year
- AIPS Athletes of the Year
- AIPS Europe Athletes of the Year
- DSL Sport Golden Badge
- Best Sportsman by OCS
- GQ ACE of the Year

== See also ==
- 2011 ATP World Tour
- 2011 Roger Federer tennis season
- 2011 Rafael Nadal tennis season

== Notes ==
- ^{a} The Australian dollar is converted to US dollar on the quotient of the numbers given in the reference for Row 1 (0.959).
- ^{b} The Euro is converted to US dollar on the quotient of the numbers given in the references for Row 5,6,7,8,13,14 and the bottom source.
- ^{c} The points and result comparison is based on the player's 2010 and 2011 singles activity.
- ^{d} The points and result comparison is based on the player's 2010 and 2011 doubles activity.
