= 2011 Davidoff Swiss Indoors – Singles qualifying =

This article displays the qualifying draw of the 2011 Swiss Indoors.

== Players ==
=== Seeds ===
1. (Australia) Bernard Tomic (first round)
2. (United States) James Blake (qualified)
3. (Poland) Łukasz Kubot (qualified)
4. (Ukraine) Sergiy Stakhovsky (first round)
5. (Kazakhstan) Mikhail Kukushkin (qualifying competition, lucky loser)
6. (Uzbekistan) Denis Istomin (first round)
7. (United States) Ryan Harrison (first round)
8. (Germany) Michael Berrer (first round)

=== Qualifiers ===
1. (Switzerland) Michael Lammer
2. (United States) James Blake
3. (Poland) Łukasz Kubot
4. (Germany) Tobias Kamke

=== Lucky losers ===
1. (Kazakhstan) Mikhail Kukushkin
2. (Switzerland) Marco Chiudinelli

== Qualifying draw ==
=== First qualifier ===
First round
1	(Australia) Bernard Tomic	7^{7}	4	5
WC	(Switzerland) Michael Lammer	6^{3}	6	7
WC	(Switzerland) Marco Chiudinelli	7	6
6	(Uzbekistan) Denis Istomin	5	0

Qualifying competition
WC	(Switzerland) Michael Lammer	3	7^{7}	6
WC	(Switzerland) Marco Chiudinelli	6	6^{2}	0

=== Second qualifier ===
First round
2	(United States) James Blake	6	6
(Turkey) Marsel İlhan	2	2
(Austria) Andreas Haider-Maurer	2	6	2
5	(Kazakhstan) Mikhail Kukushkin	6	2	6

Qualifying competition
2	(United States) James Blake	7^{7}	3	6
5	(Kazakhstan) Mikhail Kukushkin	6^{4}	6	0

=== Third qualifier ===
First round
3	(Poland) Łukasz Kubot	6	2	6
(Germany) Matthias Bachinger	4	6	2
WC	(Switzerland) Stéphane Bohli	6	7
7	(United States) Ryan Harrison	4	5

Qualifying competition
3	(Poland) Łukasz Kubot	4	6	6
WC	(Switzerland) Stéphane Bohli	6	4	3

=== Fourth qualifier ===
First round
4	(Ukraine) Sergiy Stakhovsky	5	4
(Slovakia) Lukáš Lacko	7	6
(Germany) Tobias Kamke	6	2	6
8	(Germany) Michael Berrer	2	6	3

Qualifying competition
(Slovakia) Lukáš Lacko	6^{6}	3
(Germany) Tobias Kamke	7^{8}	6
