= 2011 Swiss Indoors – Singles =

Singles
- 2011 Swiss Indoors

Final
- Champion: (Switzerland) Roger Federer
- Runner-up: (Japan) Kei Nishikori
- Score: 6–1, 6–3

Details
- Draw: 32 (4 Q / 2 WC )
- Seeds: 8

Events
Singles	Doubles
← 2010 ·	Swiss Indoors	· 2012 →

Roger Federer was the defending champion and retained the title, beating Kei Nishikori in the final, 6–1, 6–3. It was Federer's first title in almost ten months but was the first of three that Federer won in succession to end the season.

== Seeds ==
1. (Serbia) Novak Djokovic (semifinals)
2. (United Kingdom) Andy Murray (withdrew due to right gluteal strain)
3. (Switzerland) Roger Federer (champion)
4. (Czech Republic) Tomáš Berdych (first round)
5. (United States) Mardy Fish (first round, retired due to left hamstring injury)
6. (Serbia) Janko Tipsarević (first round, retired due to left hamstring injury)
7. (United States) Andy Roddick (quarterfinals)
8. (Serbia) Viktor Troicki (first round)

== Draw ==
=== Key ===
- Q = Qualifier
- WC = Wild card
- LL = Lucky loser
- Alt = Alternate
- SE = Special exempt
- PR = Protected ranking
- ITF = ITF entry
- JE = Junior exempt
- w/o = Walkover
- r = Retired
- d = Defaulted
- SR = Special ranking

=== Finals ===
Semifinals
1	(Serbia) Novak Djokovic	6	6^{4}	0
WC	(Japan) Kei Nishikori	2	7^{7}	6
3	(Switzerland) Roger Federer	7^{7}	6
(Switzerland) Stanislas Wawrinka	6^{5}	2

Final
WC	(Japan) Kei Nishikori	1	3
3	(Switzerland) Roger Federer	6	6

=== Top half ===
First round
1	(Serbia) N Djokovic	6	4	7
(Belgium) X Malisse	2	6	5
Q	(Germany) T Kamke	7	5	2
Q	(Poland) Ł Kubot	5	7	6
(Russia) M Youzhny	4	3
Q	(Switzerland) M Lammer	6	6
(Cyprus) M Baghdatis	4	7^{10}	6
8	(Serbia) V Troicki	6	6^{8}	2
4	(Czech Republic) T Berdych	6	3	2
WC	(Japan) K Nishikori	3	6	6
(Italy) A Seppi	7^{7}	6^{5}	6
(Luxembourg) G Müller	6^{4}	7^{7}	2
LL	(Kazakhstan) M Kukushkin	6	6
WC	(United States) D Young	4	2
Q	(United States) J Blake	0
5	(United States) M Fish	1^{r}

Second round
1	(Serbia) N Djokovic	6	6
Q	(Poland) Ł Kubot	1	2
Q	(Switzerland) M Lammer	6^{2}	7^{7}	3
(Cyprus) M Baghdatis	7^{7}	6^{2}	6
WC	(Japan) K Nishikori	6	7^{7}
(Italy) A Seppi	3	6^{4}
LL	(Kazakhstan) M Kukushkin	6	6
Q	(United States) J Blake	3	4

Quarterfinals
1	(Serbia) N Djokovic	2	6	6
(Cyprus) M Baghdatis	6	2	3
WC	(Japan) K Nishikori	6	5	6
LL	(Kazakhstan) M Kukushkin	4	7	4

Semifinals
1	(Serbia) N Djokovic	6	6^{4}	0
WC	(Japan) K Nishikori	2	7^{7}	6

=== Bottom half ===
First round
7	(United States) A Roddick	6	6
(Germany) T Haas	3	4
(Colombia) S Giraldo	1	3
(Czech Republic) R Štěpánek	6	6
(Brazil) T Bellucci	7^{7}	4	3
(Finland) J Nieminen	6^{5}	6	6
(Italy) P Starace	6^{3}	4
3	(Switzerland) R Federer	7^{7}	6
6	(Serbia) J Tipsarević	1^{r}
(Germany) F Mayer	5
(France) M Llodra	5	4
(Croatia) I Ljubičić	7	6
(Croatia) I Dodig	4	4
(Switzerland) S Wawrinka	6	6
(Netherlands) R Haase	6	7^{9}
LL	(Switzerland) M Chiudinelli	2	6^{7}

Second round
7	(United States) A Roddick	2	6	6
(Czech Republic) R Štěpánek	6	3	3
(Finland) J Nieminen	1	6	3
3	(Switzerland) R Federer	6	4	6
(Germany) F Mayer	6	6
(Croatia) I Ljubičić	3	1
(Switzerland) S Wawrinka	4	6	6
(Netherlands) R Haase	6	1	2

Quarterfinals
7	(United States) A Roddick	3	2
3	(Switzerland) R Federer	6	6
(Germany) F Mayer	2	2
(Switzerland) S Wawrinka	6	6

Semifinals
3	(Switzerland) R Federer	7^{7}	6
(Switzerland) S Wawrinka	6^{5}	2

== Qualifying ==
=== Seeds ===
1. (Australia) Bernard Tomic (first round)
2. (United States) James Blake (qualified)
3. (Poland) Łukasz Kubot (qualified)
4. (Ukraine) Sergiy Stakhovsky (first round)
5. (Kazakhstan) Mikhail Kukushkin (qualifying competition, lucky loser)
6. (Uzbekistan) Denis Istomin (first round)
7. (United States) Ryan Harrison (first round)
8. (Germany) Michael Berrer (first round)

=== Qualifiers ===
1. (Switzerland) Michael Lammer
2. (United States) James Blake
3. (Poland) Łukasz Kubot
4. (Germany) Tobias Kamke

=== Lucky losers ===
1. (Kazakhstan) Mikhail Kukushkin
2. (Switzerland) Marco Chiudinelli

=== Qualifying draw ===
==== First qualifier ====
First round
1	(Australia) Bernard Tomic	7^{7}	4	5
WC	(Switzerland) Michael Lammer	6^{3}	6	7
WC	(Switzerland) Marco Chiudinelli	7	6
6	(Uzbekistan) Denis Istomin	5	0

Qualifying competition
WC	(Switzerland) Michael Lammer	3	7^{7}	6
WC	(Switzerland) Marco Chiudinelli	6	6^{2}	0

==== Second qualifier ====
First round
2	(United States) James Blake	6	6
(Turkey) Marsel İlhan	2	2
(Austria) Andreas Haider-Maurer	2	6	2
5	(Kazakhstan) Mikhail Kukushkin	6	2	6

Qualifying competition
2	(United States) James Blake	7^{7}	3	6
5	(Kazakhstan) Mikhail Kukushkin	6^{4}	6	0

==== Third qualifier ====
First round
3	(Poland) Łukasz Kubot	6	2	6
(Germany) Matthias Bachinger	4	6	2
WC	(Switzerland) Stéphane Bohli	6	7
7	(United States) Ryan Harrison	4	5

Qualifying competition
3	(Poland) Łukasz Kubot	4	6	6
WC	(Switzerland) Stéphane Bohli	6	4	3

==== Fourth qualifier ====
First round
4	(Ukraine) Sergiy Stakhovsky	5	4
(Slovakia) Lukáš Lacko	7	6
(Germany) Tobias Kamke	6	2	6
8	(Germany) Michael Berrer	2	6	3

Qualifying competition
(Slovakia) Lukáš Lacko	6^{6}	3
(Germany) Tobias Kamke	7^{8}	6
