= 2012 Swiss Indoors =

- Date: 22–28 October
- Edition: 43rd
- Category: ATP World Tour 500
- Draw: 32S / 16D
- Prize money: €1,404,300
- Surface: Hard / indoor
- Venue: St. Jakobshalle

Champions

Singles
- (Argentina) Juan Martín del Potro

Doubles
- (Canada) Daniel Nestor / (Serbia) Nenad Zimonjić
| ← 2011 · | Swiss Indoors | · 2013 → |

The 2012 Swiss Indoors was a tennis tournament that was played on indoor hard courts. It was the 43rd edition of the event known that year as the Swiss Indoors, and was part of the 500 series of the 2012 ATP World Tour. It was held at the St. Jakobshalle in Basel, Switzerland, from 22 October until 28 October 2012. Second-seeded Juan Martín del Potro won the singles title.

== Finals ==
=== Singles ===
(Argentina) Juan Martín del Potro defeated (Switzerland) Roger Federer, 6–4, 6–7^{(5–7)}, 7–6^{(7–3)}

=== Doubles ===
(Canada) Daniel Nestor / (Serbia) Nenad Zimonjić defeated (Philippines) Treat Conrad Huey / (United Kingdom) Dominic Inglot, 7–5, 6–7^{(4–7)}, [10–5]

== Singles main draw entrants ==
=== Seeds ===
| Country | Player | Rank^{1} | Seed |
|---|---|---|---|
| SUI | Roger Federer | 1 | 1 |
| ARG | Juan Martín del Potro | 8 | 2 |
| FRA | Richard Gasquet | 13 | 3 |
| SUI | Stanislas Wawrinka | 17 | 4 |
| ITA | Andreas Seppi | 25 | 5 |
| RUS | Mikhail Youzhny | 27 | 6 |
| GER | Florian Mayer | 28 | 7 |
| SRB | Viktor Troicki | 29 | 8 |

- ^{1} Rankings as of October 15, 2012

=== Other entrants ===
The following players received wildcards into the singles main draw:

- (Switzerland) Marco Chiudinelli
- (France) Paul-Henri Mathieu
- (Switzerland) Henri Laaksonen

The following players received entry from the qualifying draw:

- (Czech Republic) Radek Štěpánek
- (Poland) Łukasz Kubot
- (Russia) Andrey Kuznetsov
- (Germany) Benjamin Becker

=== Withdrawals ===
- (Spain) Rafael Nadal (left knee injury)
- (Japan) Kei Nishikori (ankle injury)
- (United Kingdom) Andy Murray

== Doubles main draw entrants ==
=== Seeds ===
| Country | Player | Rank^{1} | Country | Player | Rank^{1} | Seed |
|---|---|---|---|---|---|---|
| CAN | Daniel Nestor | 3 | SRB | Nenad Zimonjić | 3 | 1 |
| IND | Mahesh Bhupathi | 16 | IND | Rohan Bopanna | 10 | 2 |
| PAK | Aisam-ul-Haq Qureshi | 11 | NED | Jean-Julien Rojer | 15 | 3 |
| POL | Mariusz Fyrstenberg | 13 | POL | Marcin Matkowski | 14 | 4 |

- ^{1} Rankings as of October 15, 2012

=== Other entrants ===
The following teams received wildcards into the doubles main draw:

- (Switzerland) Marco Chiudinelli / (Switzerland) Michael Lammer
- (Switzerland) Adrien Bossel / (Switzerland) Henri Laaksonen
