= 2012 Swiss Indoors – Doubles =

Doubles
- 2012 Swiss Indoors

Final
- Champions: (Canada) Daniel Nestor (Serbia) Nenad Zimonjić
- Runners-up: (Philippines) Treat Conrad Huey (United Kingdom) Dominic Inglot
- Score: 7–5, 6–7^{(4–7)}, [10–5]

Details
- Draw: 16
- Seeds: 4

Events
Singles	Doubles
← 2011 ·	Swiss Indoors	· 2013 →

Michaël Llodra and Nenad Zimonjić were the defending champions but decided not to participate together.
Llodra was scheduled to play with Jérémy Chardy, but the pair withdrew before their first round match, while Zimonjić played alongside Daniel Nestor and successfully defended the title, defeating Treat Conrad Huey and Dominic Inglot 7–5, 6–7^{(4–7)}, [10–5] in the final.

== Seeds ==
1. (Canada) Daniel Nestor / (Serbia) Nenad Zimonjić (champions)
2. (India) Mahesh Bhupathi / (India) Rohan Bopanna (first round)
3. (Pakistan) Aisam-ul-Haq Qureshi / (Netherlands) Jean-Julien Rojer (first round)
4. (Poland) Mariusz Fyrstenberg / (Poland) Marcin Matkowski (semifinals)

== Draw ==
=== Key ===
- Q = Qualifier
- WC = Wild card
- LL = Lucky loser
- Alt = Alternate
- SE = Special exempt
- PR = Protected ranking
- ITF = ITF entry
- JE = Junior exempt
- w/o = Walkover
- r = Retired
- d = Defaulted
- SR = Special ranking

=== Draw ===
First round
1	(Canada) D Nestor (Serbia) N Zimonjić	6	6
WC	(Switzerland) M Chiudinelli (Switzerland) M Lammer	0	4
(Poland) Ł Kubot (Italy) A Seppi	6	6
(Austria) O Marach (Germany) F Mayer	4	3
3	(Pakistan) A-u-H Qureshi (Netherlands) J-J Rojer	4	7^{7}	[6]
(Italy) D Bracciali (Czech Republic) F Čermák	6	6^{5}	[10]
WC	(Switzerland) A Bossel (Switzerland) H Laaksonen	2	2
(South Africa) K Anderson (Serbia) V Troicki	6	6
(United Kingdom) J Marray (Denmark) F Nielsen	7^{8}	2	[10]
(United States) E Butorac (Australia) P Hanley	6^{6}	6	[5]
(France) J Benneteau (France) R Gasquet	7^{7}	4	[10]
4	(Poland) M Fyrstenberg (Poland) M Matkowski	6^{5}	6	[12]
(Philippines) TC Huey (United Kingdom) D Inglot	6	7
(Brazil) T Bellucci (Finland) J Nieminen	2	5
Alt	(Netherlands) R Haase (Belgium) D Norman	7	2	[14]
2	(India) M Bhupathi (India) R Bopanna	5	6	[12]

Quarterfinals
1	(Canada) D Nestor (Serbia) N Zimonjić	7^{7}	6
(Poland) Ł Kubot (Italy) A Seppi	6^{2}	4
(Italy) D Bracciali (Czech Republic) F Čermák	5	7	[10]
(South Africa) K Anderson (Serbia) V Troicki	7	5	[5]
(United Kingdom) J Marray (Denmark) F Nielsen	5	6^{6}
4	(Poland) M Fyrstenberg (Poland) M Matkowski	7	7^{8}
(Philippines) TC Huey (United Kingdom) D Inglot	7^{7}	6
Alt	(Netherlands) R Haase (Belgium) D Norman	6^{5}	4

Semifinals
1	(Canada) D Nestor (Serbia) N Zimonjić	6	6
(Italy) D Bracciali (Czech Republic) F Čermák	3	4
4	(Poland) M Fyrstenberg (Poland) M Matkowski	6^{5}	5
(Philippines) TC Huey (United Kingdom) D Inglot	7^{7}	7

Final
1	(Canada) D Nestor (Serbia) N Zimonjić	7	6^{4}	[10]
(Philippines) TC Huey (United Kingdom) D Inglot	5	7^{7}	[5]
