= 2011 French Open – Men's singles =

Men's singles
- 2011 French Open

Final
- Champion: (Spain) Rafael Nadal
- Runner-up: (Switzerland) Roger Federer
- Score: 7–5, 7–6^{(7–3)}, 5–7, 6–1

Events
Singles	men	women		boys	girls
Doubles	men	women	mixed	boys	girls
WC Singles	men	women	quad
WC Doubles	men	women	quad
Legends	−45	45+	women
- French Open

Defending champion Rafael Nadal defeated Roger Federer in the final, 7–5, 7–6^{(7–3)}, 5–7, 6–1 to win the men's singles tennis title at the 2011 French Open. It was his sixth French Open title and tenth major title overall, tying Björn Borg's record for the most French Open titles won in the Open Era. It was the fourth time Nadal defeated Federer in the French Open final. Federer was attempting to become the first man in the Open Era and the third man overall to achieve a double career Grand Slam.

Nadal and Novak Djokovic were in contention for the world No. 1 ranking. Nadal retained the top ranking by defending the title.

This edition of the tournament saw the top four seeds advance to the semifinals. Federer ended Djokovic's 43-match winning streak dating back to the 2010 Davis Cup Finals, as well as his 41–0 unbeaten 2011 season – second only to John McEnroe's 1984 record of 42–0 for the best unbeaten start to a season.

Although this was Nadal's sixth title at the French Open, it was the first time since 2001 in which the top seed won the title.

== Seeds ==
1. (Spain) Rafael Nadal (champion)
2. (Serbia) Novak Djokovic (semifinals)
3. (Switzerland) Roger Federer (final)
4. (United Kingdom) Andy Murray (semifinals)
5. (Sweden) Robin Söderling (quarterfinals)
6. (Czech Republic) Tomáš Berdych (first round)
7. (Spain) David Ferrer (fourth round)
8. (Austria) Jürgen Melzer (second round)
9. (France) Gaël Monfils (quarterfinals)
10. (United States) Mardy Fish (third round)
11. (Spain) Nicolás Almagro (first round)
12. (Russia) Mikhail Youzhny (third round)
13. (France) Richard Gasquet (fourth round)
14. (Switzerland) Stanislas Wawrinka (fourth round)
15. (Serbia) Viktor Troicki (fourth round)
16. (Spain) Fernando Verdasco (third round)

17. (France) Jo-Wilfried Tsonga (third round)
18. (France) Gilles Simon (fourth round)
19. (Croatia) Marin Čilić (first round)
20. (Germany) Florian Mayer (second round)
21. (Ukraine) Alexandr Dolgopolov (third round)
22. (France) Michaël Llodra (first round)
23. (Brazil) Thomaz Bellucci (third round)
24. (United States) Sam Querrey (second round)
25. (Argentina) Juan Martín del Potro (third round)
26. (Canada) Milos Raonic (first round)
27. (Cyprus) Marcos Baghdatis (second round)
28. (Russia) Nikolay Davydenko (second round)
29. (Serbia) Janko Tipsarević (third round)
30. (Spain) Guillermo García-López (third round)
31. (Ukraine) Sergiy Stakhovsky (third round)
32. (South Africa) Kevin Anderson (second round)

Click on the seed number of a player to go to their draw section.

== Draw ==
Key

- Q = Qualifier
- WC = Wild card
- LL = Lucky loser
- Alt = Alternate
- ITF = ITF entry
- PR = Protected ranking
- SR = Special ranking
- SE = Special exempt
- JE = Junior exempt
- JR = Junior Accelerator Programme entrant
- CO = College Accelerator Programme entrant
- NG = Next Gen Accelerator Program entrant
- w/o = Walkover
- r = Retired
- d = Defaulted

=== Finals ===
Quarterfinals
1	(Spain) Rafael Nadal	6	6	7^{7}
5	(Sweden) Robin Söderling	4	1	6^{3}
4	(United Kingdom) Andy Murray	7^{7}	7	6
(Argentina) Juan Ignacio Chela	6^{2}	5	2
9	(France) Gaël Monfils	4	3	6^{3}
3	(Switzerland) Roger Federer	6	6	7^{7}
(Italy) Fabio Fognini
2	(Serbia) Novak Djokovic	w/o

Semifinals
1	(Spain) Rafael Nadal	6	7	6
4	(United Kingdom) Andy Murray	4	5	4
3	(Switzerland) Roger Federer	7^{7}	6	3	7^{7}
2	(Serbia) Novak Djokovic	6^{5}	3	6	6^{5}

Final
1	(Spain) Rafael Nadal	7	7^{7}	5	6
3	(Switzerland) Roger Federer	5	6^{3}	7	1

=== Top half ===
==== Section 1 ====
First round
1	(Spain) R Nadal	6	6^{2}	6^{2}	6	6
(United States) J Isner	4	7^{7}	7^{7}	2	4
(Colombia) S Giraldo	6^{5}	3	3
(Spain) P Andújar	7^{7}	6	6
(Uruguay) P Cuevas	6	3	2	1^{r}
Q	(Croatia) A Veić	4	6	6	3
Q	(Germany) D Gremelmayr	6^{2}	1	3
28	(Russia) N Davydenko	7^{7}	6	6
24	(United States) S Querrey	3	6	6	6
(Germany) P Kohlschreiber	6	1	2	4
(Croatia) I Ljubičić	6	6	6
(India) S Devvarman	4	3	4
(Russia) D Tursunov	5	6	3	6	1
(Belgium) X Malisse	7	3	6	3	6
(Argentina) J Mónaco	2	5	6	4
16	(Spain) F Verdasco	6	7	4	6

Second round
1	(Spain) R Nadal	7	6	7^{7}
(Spain) P Andújar	5	3	6^{4}
Q	(Croatia) A Veić	3	6	7	3	6
28	(Russia) N Davydenko	6	2	5	6	1
24	(United States) S Querrey	6^{2}	4	4
(Croatia) I Ljubičić	7^{7}	6	6
(Belgium) X Malisse	6	3	6^{5}	1
16	(Spain) F Verdasco	4	6	7^{7}	6

Third round
1	(Spain) R Nadal	6	6	6
Q	(Croatia) A Veić	1	3	0
(Croatia) I Ljubičić	6	7^{8}	6
16	(Spain) F Verdasco	3	6^{6}	4

Fourth round
1	(Spain) R Nadal	7	6	6
(Croatia) I Ljubičić	5	3	3

==== Section 2 ====
First round
10	(United States) M Fish	6	6^{11}	6	6
(Brazil) R Mello	2	7^{13}	2	4
(Spain) D Gimeno-Traver	2	6^{3}	3
(Netherlands) R Haase	6	7^{7}	6
(France) J Chardy	6	6	6
(Bulgaria) G Dimitrov	2	4	4
(United States) M Russell	3	6	1	0
18	(France) G Simon	6	4	6	6
27	(Cyprus) M Baghdatis	7^{7}	6	6
(Portugal) F Gil	6^{4}	2	2
Q	(Argentina) L Mayer	3	7^{7}	6	6
(Germany) D Brown	6	6^{5}	2	2
Q	(Spain) A Ramos	6	6^{5}	4	6	6
Q	(Spain) J Martí	3	7^{7}	6	1	3
LL	(United States) R Harrison	1	7^{7}	3	5
5	(Sweden) R Söderling	6	6^{5}	6	7

Second round
10	(United States) M Fish	7^{7}	6	6
(Netherlands) R Haase	6^{1}	2	1
(France) J Chardy	6	4	1	4
18	(France) G Simon	4	6	6	6
27	(Cyprus) M Baghdatis	5	4	6^{6}
Q	(Argentina) L Mayer	7	6	7^{8}
Q	(Spain) A Ramos	3	4	4
5	(Sweden) R Söderling	6	6	6

Third round
10	(United States) M Fish	3	4	2
18	(France) G Simon	6	6	6
Q	(Argentina) L Mayer	1	4	3
5	(Sweden) R Söderling	6	6	6

Fourth round
18	(France) G Simon	2	3	6^{5}
5	(Sweden) R Söderling	6	6	7^{7}

==== Section 3 ====
First round
4	(United Kingdom) A Murray	6	6	6
Q	(France) É Prodon	4	1	3
LL	(Italy) S Bolelli	6	6	6^{5}	6
Q	(Canada) F Dancevic	1	3	7^{7}	2
WC	(France) A Clément	6	1	7^{11}	6
(Italy) F Volandri	3	6	6^{9}	4
(Germany) M Berrer	6	4	6	6
26	(Canada) M Raonic	4	6	3	4
21	(Ukraine) A Dolgopolov	6	6	6
(Germany) R Schüttler	3	3	1
(Austria) A Haider-Maurer	6	6^{5}	6	6
(United States) R Sweeting	1	7^{7}	2	0
(Germany) T Kamke	6^{5}	6	6	6
(Belgium) O Rochus	7^{7}	3	3	2
(Germany) J Reister	4	3	3
15	(Serbia) V Troicki	6	6	6

Second round
4	(United Kingdom) A Murray	7^{7}	6	7
LL	(Italy) S Bolelli	6^{4}	4	5
WC	(France) A Clément	6^{6}	6	5	4
(Germany) M Berrer	7^{8}	3	7	6
21	(Ukraine) A Dolgopolov	6	6	6
(Austria) A Haider-Maurer	2	4	2
(Germany) T Kamke	2	2	6^{4}
15	(Serbia) V Troicki	6	6	7^{7}

Third round
4	(United Kingdom) A Murray	6	6	6
(Germany) M Berrer	2	3	2
21	(Ukraine) A Dolgopolov	4	6	3	4
15	(Serbia) V Troicki	6	3	6	6

Fourth round
4	(United Kingdom) A Murray	4	4	6	6	7
15	(Serbia) V Troicki	6	6	3	2	5

==== Section 4 ====
First round
11	(Spain) N Almagro	6	6	6^{3}	6^{5}	4
Q	(Poland) Ł Kubot	3	2	7^{7}	7^{7}	6
(Argentina) C Berlocq	7	6	6
WC	(Australia) B Tomic	5	4	2
(Italy) P Starace	6^{2}	1	1
Q	(Colombia) A Falla	7^{7}	6	6
(Russia) I Kunitsyn	3	6	4	3
20	(Germany) F Mayer	6	4	6	6
32	(South Africa) K Anderson	6	6	6^{6}	6
(France) N Mahut	4	4	7^{8}	3
(Argentina) JI Chela	7^{7}	6	6
WC	(United States) T Smyczek	6^{5}	1	1
WC	(France) É Roger-Vasselin	6	2	4	6	5
Q	(Czech Republic) L Rosol	3	6	6	3	7
LL	(Germany) A Beck	3	4	2
8	(Austria) J Melzer	6	6	6

Second round
Q	(Poland) Ł Kubot	6	7^{7}	6
(Argentina) C Berlocq	3	6^{4}	3
Q	(Colombia) A Falla	4	7^{7}	6	6
20	(Germany) F Mayer	6	6^{4}	1	2
32	(South Africa) K Anderson	6	3	4	6	2
(Argentina) JI Chela	3	6	6	4	6
Q	(Czech Republic) L Rosol	6^{4}	6	4	7^{7}	6
8	(Austria) J Melzer	7^{7}	4	6	6^{3}	4

Third round
Q	(Poland) Ł Kubot	7^{7}	4	5	4
Q	(Colombia) A Falla	6^{4}	6	7	6
(Argentina) JI Chela	6	6	3	7^{7}
Q	(Czech Republic) L Rosol	2	4	6	6^{5}

Fourth round
Q	(Colombia) A Falla	6	2	6	6^{5}	2
(Argentina) JI Chela	4	6	1	7^{7}	6

=== Bottom half ===
==== Section 5 ====
First round
7	(Spain) D Ferrer	6	6	6
(Finland) J Nieminen	3	3	1
(France) J Benneteau	4	6	6	6
(Portugal) R Machado	6	1	2	0
(Japan) K Nishikori	6	6	6
(Chinese Taipei) Y-h Lu	1	3	4
Q	(France) D Guez	7^{9}	3	3	3
31	(Ukraine) S Stakhovsky	6^{7}	6	6	6
22	(France) M Llodra	7^{7}	3	3	3
Q	(Belgium) S Darcis	6^{5}	6	6	6
(Germany) P Petzschner	7^{7}	6	6
(Germany) M Zverev	6^{3}	0	4
(France) A Mannarino	2	3	2
WC	(France) G Rufin	6	6	6
Q	(Germany) B Phau	6	3	5	0
9	(France) G Monfils	4	6	7	6

Second round
7	(Spain) D Ferrer	6	6	6
(France) J Benneteau	3	4	2
(Japan) K Nishikori	1	6	3	6^{3}
31	(Ukraine) S Stakhovsky	6	3	6	7^{7}
Q	(Belgium) S Darcis	7	6	6
(Germany) P Petzschner	5	4	4
WC	(France) G Rufin	3	6	1	3
9	(France) G Monfils	6	1	6	6

Third round
7	(Spain) D Ferrer	6	6	6
31	(Ukraine) S Stakhovsky	1	1	3
Q	(Belgium) S Darcis	3	4	5
9	(France) G Monfils	6	6	7

Fourth round
7	(Spain) D Ferrer	4	6	5	6	6
9	(France) G Monfils	6	2	7	1	8

==== Section 6 ====
First round
14	(Switzerland) S Wawrinka	4	6	6	6
Q	(France) A Gensse	6	3	4	2
Q	(Netherlands) T Schoorel	7^{7}	6	6
(Argentina) M González	6^{5}	3	3
(France) F Serra	4	1	3
(Russia) I Andreev	6	6	6
(Czech Republic) J Hájek	3	2	2
17	(France) J-W Tsonga	6	6	6
29	(Serbia) J Tipsarević	7^{7}	6	6
(Argentina) B Dabul	6^{1}	1	0
(Croatia) I Dodig	3	6	6^{6}	4
(Spain) P Riba	6	3	7^{8}	6
WC	(France) V Millot	2	7	7^{7}	4	1
WC	(France) M Teixeira	6	5	6^{4}	6	6
(Spain) F López	3	4	6^{3}
3	(Switzerland) R Federer	6	6	7^{7}

Second round
14	(Switzerland) S Wawrinka	6	6	6
Q	(Netherlands) T Schoorel	3	2	4
(Russia) I Andreev	3	6^{4}	3
17	(France) J-W Tsonga	6	7^{7}	6
29	(Serbia) J Tipsarević	6	6	6
(Spain) P Riba	1	3	0
WC	(France) M Teixeira	3	0	2
3	(Switzerland) R Federer	6	6	6

Third round
14	(Switzerland) S Wawrinka	4	6^{3}	7^{7}	6	6
17	(France) J-W Tsonga	6	7^{7}	6^{5}	2	3
29	(Serbia) J Tipsarević	1	4	3
3	(Switzerland) R Federer	6	6	6

Fourth round
14	(Switzerland) S Wawrinka	3	2	5
3	(Switzerland) R Federer	6	6	7

==== Section 7 ====
First round
6	(Czech Republic) T Berdych	6	6	2	2	7
Q	(France) S Robert	3	3	6	6	9
(Italy) F Fognini	6	6	6
(Uzbekistan) D Istomin	4	2	2
PR	(Germany) T Haas	4	6	6^{1}	4
LL	(Turkey) M İlhan	6	4	7^{7}	6
(United States) R Kendrick	1	5	6	3
30	(Spain) G García-López	6	7	4	6
19	(Croatia) M Čilić	6^{5}	4	4
(Spain) R Ramírez Hidalgo	7^{7}	6	6
LL	(France) M Gicquel	4	4	2
(Spain) A Montañés	6	6	6
(Germany) D Brands	2	4	4
(Kazakhstan) M Kukushkin	6	6	6
(Japan) G Soeda	5	2	4
12	(Russia) M Youzhny	7	6	6

Second round
Q	(France) S Robert	2	1	0
(Italy) F Fognini	6	6	6
LL	(Turkey) M İlhan	4	6	2	6	11
30	(Spain) G García-López	6	1	6	4	13
(Spain) R Ramírez Hidalgo	7^{7}	4	1	2
(Spain) A Montañés	6^{5}	6	6	6
(Kazakhstan) M Kukushkin	3	5	4
12	(Russia) M Youzhny	6	7	6

Third round
(Italy) F Fognini	4	6	6	6
30	(Spain) G García-López	6	3	3	1
(Spain) A Montañés	6	7^{7}	6
12	(Russia) M Youzhny	1	6^{0}	1

Fourth round
(Italy) F Fognini	4	6	3	6	11
(Spain) A Montañés	6	4	6	3	9

==== Section 8 ====
First round
13	(France) R Gasquet	7	6	6
(Czech Republic) R Štěpánek	5	3	0
LL	(United States) A Bogomolov Jr.	3	6	6^{6}	2
(Spain) M Granollers	6	3	7^{8}	6
(Russia) T Gabashvili	3	5	5
(Italy) A Seppi	6	7	7
(Kazakhstan) A Golubev	4	4	7^{7}	6^{5}
23	(Brazil) T Bellucci	6	6	6^{4}	7^{7}
25	(Argentina) JM del Potro	6^{7}	6	7	6
PR	(Croatia) I Karlović	7^{9}	3	5	4
(Latvia) E Gulbis	1	4	2
(Slovenia) B Kavčič	6	6	6
WC	(France) B Paire	5	6	1	6^{4}
(Romania) V Hănescu	7	4	6	7^{7}
(Netherlands) T de Bakker	2	1	3
2	(Serbia) N Djokovic	6	6	6

Second round
13	(France) R Gasquet	4	6	6	6
(Spain) M Granollers	6	3	2	4
(Italy) A Seppi	1	2	4
23	(Brazil) T Bellucci	6	6	6
25	(Argentina) JM del Potro	6	6	6
(Slovenia) B Kavčič	3	2	4
(Romania) V Hănescu	4	1	3^{r}
2	(Serbia) N Djokovic	6	6	2

Third round
13	(France) R Gasquet	6	6	3	6
23	(Brazil) T Bellucci	2	3	6	3
25	(Argentina) JM del Potro	3	6	3	2
2	(Serbia) N Djokovic	6	3	6	6

Fourth round
13	(France) R Gasquet	4	4	2
2	(Serbia) N Djokovic	6	6	6

Preceded by 2011 Australian Open – Men's singles	Grand Slam men's singles	Succeeded by 2011 Wimbledon Championships – Men's singles
