= 2011 Swiss Indoors – Doubles =

Doubles
- 2011 Swiss Indoors

Final
- Champions: (France) Michaël Llodra (Serbia) Nenad Zimonjić
- Runners-up: (Belarus) Max Mirnyi (Canada) Daniel Nestor
- Score: 6–4, 7–5

Details
- Draw: 16
- Seeds: 4

Events
Singles	Doubles
← 2010 ·	Swiss Indoors	· 2012 →

Bob Bryan and Mike Bryan were the defending champions but decided to participate at Valencia instead.
Michaël Llodra and Nenad Zimonjić won the title, defeating Max Mirnyi and Daniel Nestor in the final.

== Seeds ==
1. (France) Michaël Llodra / (Serbia) Nenad Zimonjić (champions)
2. (Belarus) Max Mirnyi / (Canada) Daniel Nestor (final)
3. (Germany) Christopher Kas / (Austria) Alexander Peya (quarterfinals)
4. (India) Mahesh Bhupathi / (Slovakia) Michal Mertiňák (first round)

== Draw ==
=== Key ===
- Q = Qualifier
- WC = Wild card
- LL = Lucky loser
- Alt = Alternate
- SE = Special exempt
- PR = Protected ranking
- ITF = ITF entry
- JE = Junior exempt
- w/o = Walkover
- r = Retired
- d = Defaulted
- SR = Special ranking

=== Draw ===
First round
1	(France) M Llodra (Serbia) N Zimonjić	6	7^{12}
WC	(Switzerland) M Lammer (Switzerland) A Sadecky	3	6^{10}
(Poland) Ł Kubot (Czech Republic) R Štěpánek	3	7^{7}	[9]
(United States) M Fish (United States) A Roddick	6	6^{5}	[11]
3	(Germany) C Kas (Austria) A Peya	7^{7}	6
(Mexico) S González (United States) S Lipsky	6^{0}	2
(Croatia) I Dodig (Serbia) V Troicki	6	3	[10]
(Brazil) T Bellucci (Colombia) S Giraldo	3	6	[5]
WC	(Switzerland) S Bohli (Switzerland) M Chiudinelli	3	1
(United Kingdom) C Fleming (United Kingdom) R Hutchins	6	6
(Belgium) X Malisse (Belgium) D Norman	5	6	[11]
4	(India) M Bhupathi (Slovakia) M Mertiňák	7	3	[9]
(Netherlands) R Haase (Germany) F Mayer	6	6
Alt	(Uzbekistan) D Istomin (Germany) F Moser	4	4
(United Kingdom) A Murray (United Kingdom) J Murray
2	(Belarus) M Mirnyi (Canada) D Nestor	w/o

Quarterfinals
1	(France) M Llodra (Serbia) N Zimonjić	w/o
(United States) M Fish (United States) A Roddick
3	(Germany) C Kas (Austria) A Peya	6	4	[5]
(Croatia) I Dodig (Serbia) V Troicki	4	6	[10]
(United Kingdom) C Fleming (United Kingdom) R Hutchins	3	6	[4]
(Belgium) X Malisse (Belgium) D Norman	6	2	[10]
(Netherlands) R Haase (Germany) F Mayer	3	5
2	(Belarus) M Mirnyi (Canada) D Nestor	6	7

Semifinals
1	(France) M Llodra (Serbia) N Zimonjić	6	7^{7}
(Croatia) I Dodig (Serbia) V Troicki	2	6^{5}
(Belgium) X Malisse (Belgium) D Norman	2	2
2	(Belarus) M Mirnyi (Canada) D Nestor	6	6

Final
1	(France) M Llodra (Serbia) N Zimonjić	6	7
2	(Belarus) M Mirnyi (Canada) D Nestor	4	5
