= 2012 Swiss Indoors – Singles =

Singles
- 2012 Swiss Indoors

Final
- Champion: (Argentina) Juan Martín del Potro
- Runner-up: (Switzerland) Roger Federer
- Score: 6–4, 6–7^{(5–7)}, 7–6^{(7–3)}

Details
- Draw: 32 (4 Q / 3 WC )
- Seeds: 8

Events
Singles	Doubles
- Swiss Indoors

Roger Federer was the defending champion but lost to Juan Martín del Potro 6–4, 6–7^{(5–7)}, 7–6^{(7–3)} in the final.

== Seeds ==
1. (Switzerland) Roger Federer (final)
2. (Argentina) Juan Martín del Potro (champion)
3. (France) Richard Gasquet (semifinals)
4. (Switzerland) Stanislas Wawrinka (first round)
5. (Italy) Andreas Seppi (first round)
6. (Russia) Mikhail Youzhny (quarterfinals)
7. (Germany) Florian Mayer (first round)
8. (Serbia) Viktor Troicki (first round)

== Draw ==
Key

- Q = Qualifier
- WC = Wild card
- LL = Lucky loser
- Alt = Alternate
- ITF = ITF entry
- PR = Protected ranking
- SR = Special ranking
- SE = Special exempt
- JE = Junior exempt
- JR = Junior Accelerator Programme entrant
- CO = College Accelerator Programme entrant
- NG = Next Gen Accelerator Program entrant
- w/o = Walkover
- r = Retired
- d = Defaulted

=== Finals ===
Semifinals
1	(Switzerland) Roger Federer	7	6
WC	(France) Paul-Henri Mathieu	5	4
3	(France) Richard Gasquet	2	2
2	(Argentina) Juan Martín del Potro	6	6

Final
1	(Switzerland) Roger Federer	4	7^{7}	6^{3}
2	(Argentina) Juan Martín del Potro	6	6^{5}	7^{7}

=== Top half ===
First round
1	(Switzerland) R Federer	7	6
Q	(Germany) B Becker	5	3
(Brazil) T Bellucci	4	6	6
(Japan) G Soeda	6	4	3
Q	(Poland) Ł Kubot	6	6
(Slovakia) L Lacko	4	4
(France) B Paire	4	6	6
5	(Italy) A Seppi	6	2	3
4	(Switzerland) S Wawrinka	6^{7}	6^{3}
(Russia) N Davydenko	7^{9}	7^{7}
WC	(Switzerland) H Laaksonen	2	5
WC	(France) P-H Mathieu	6	7
Q	(Russia) A Kuznetsov	6	3	3
(France) J Benneteau	4	6	6
(Bulgaria) G Dimitrov	6	6
8	(Serbia) V Troicki	3	2

Second round
1	(Switzerland) R Federer	6	6^{6}	7
(Brazil) T Bellucci	3	7^{8}	5
Q	(Poland) Ł Kubot	4	4
(France) B Paire	6	6
(Russia) N Davydenko	3	7^{7}	4
WC	(France) P-H Mathieu	6	6^{2}	6
(France) J Benneteau	6^{5}	7^{7}	6^{3}
(Bulgaria) G Dimitrov	7^{7}	6^{1}	7^{7}

Quarterfinals
1	(Switzerland) R Federer	6	6
(France) B Paire	2	2
WC	(France) P-H Mathieu	7^{7}	7^{7}
(Bulgaria) G Dimitrov	6^{2}	6^{4}

Semifinals
1	(Switzerland) R Federer	7	6
WC	(France) P-H Mathieu	5	4

=== Bottom half ===
First round
6	(Russia) M Youzhny	6	6
(Australia) B Tomic	0	2
LL	(Romania) V Hănescu	3	6^{3}
(Australia) M Ebden	6	7^{7}
(Spain) G García López	7	3	4
WC	(Switzerland) M Chiudinelli	5	6	6
(Netherlands) R Haase	6	3	2
3	(France) R Gasquet	4	6	6
7	(Germany) F Mayer	2	3
(Australia) M Matosevic	6	6
(Finland) J Nieminen	6^{4}	3
(South Africa) K Anderson	7^{7}	6
Q	(Czech Republic) R Štěpánek	6	6^{5}	3
(United States) B Baker	2	7^{7}	6
(Colombia) A Falla	4	1
2	(Argentina) JM del Potro	6	6

Second round
6	(Russia) M Youzhny	6	6
(Australia) M Ebden	3	1
WC	(Switzerland) M Chiudinelli	1	4
3	(France) R Gasquet	6	6
(Australia) M Matosevic	3	7^{7}	3
(South Africa) K Anderson	6	6^{5}	6
(United States) B Baker	5	1
2	(Argentina) JM del Potro	7	6

Quarterfinals
6	(Russia) M Youzhny	2	6^{5}
3	(France) R Gasquet	6	7^{7}
(South Africa) K Anderson	6	6^{3}	2
2	(Argentina) JM del Potro	3	7^{7}	6

Semifinals
3	(France) R Gasquet	2	2
2	(Argentina) JM del Potro	6	6

== Qualifying ==
=== Seeds ===
1. (Czech Republic) Radek Štěpánek (qualified)
2. (Romania) Victor Hănescu (qualifying competition, retired because of a stomach problem, lucky loser)
3. (Poland) Łukasz Kubot (qualified)
4. (Germany) Tobias Kamke (qualifying competition)
5. (Russia) Andrey Kuznetsov (qualified)
6. (Belgium) Steve Darcis (first round)
7. (Germany) Benjamin Becker (qualified)
8. (Germany) Björn Phau (qualifying competition)

=== Qualifiers ===
1. (Czech Republic) Radek Štěpánek
2. (Russia) Andrey Kuznetsov
3. (Poland) Łukasz Kubot
4. (Germany) Benjamin Becker

=== Lucky losers ===
1. (Romania) Victor Hănescu

=== Draw ===
==== First qualifier ====
First round
1	(Czech Republic) Radek Štěpánek	4	6	6
(Ukraine) Sergiy Stakhovsky	6	3	3
(France) Michaël Llodra	6	6
6	(Belgium) Steve Darcis	2	1

Qualifying competition
1	(Czech Republic) Radek Štěpánek	7^{8}	6
(France) Michaël Llodra	6^{6}	3

==== Second qualifier ====
First round
2	(Romania) Victor Hănescu	6	6
WC	(Latvia) Ernests Gulbis	3	3
WC	(Switzerland) Michael Lammer	4	2
5	(Russia) Andrey Kuznetsov	6	6

Qualifying competition
2	(Romania) Victor Hănescu	1^{r}
5	(Russia) Andrey Kuznetsov	4

==== Third qualifier ====
First round
3	(Poland) Łukasz Kubot	6	6^{7}	7^{7}
(Germany) Matthias Bachinger	3	7^{9}	6^{2}
WC	(Switzerland) Sandro Ehrat	1	4
8	(Germany) Björn Phau	6	6

Qualifying competition
3	(Poland) Łukasz Kubot	6^{2}	6	6
8	(Germany) Björn Phau	7^{7}	2	0

==== Fourth qualifier ====
First round
4	(Germany) Tobias Kamke	6	6
Alt	(France) Josselin Ouanna	3	4
(France) Florent Serra	6^{3}	3
7	(Germany) Benjamin Becker	7^{7}	6

Qualifying competition
4	(Germany) Tobias Kamke	3	5
7	(Germany) Benjamin Becker	6	7
