= 2011 French Open =

- Date: 22 May – 5 June 2011
- Edition: 110
- Category: 81st Grand Slam (ITF)
- Surface: Clay
- Location: Paris (XVI^{e}), France
- Venue: Stade Roland Garros

Champions

Men's singles
- (Spain) Rafael Nadal

Women's singles
- (China) Li Na

Men's doubles
- (Belarus) Max Mirnyi / (Canada) Daniel Nestor

Women's doubles
- (Czech Republic) Andrea Hlaváčková / (Czech Republic) Lucie Hradecká

Mixed doubles
- (Australia) Casey Dellacqua / (United States) Scott Lipsky

Wheelchair men's singles
- (Netherlands) Maikel Scheffers

Wheelchair women's singles
- (Netherlands) Esther Vergeer

Wheelchair men's doubles
- (Japan) Shingo Kunieda / (France) Nicolas Peifer

Wheelchair women's doubles
- (Netherlands) Esther Vergeer / (Netherlands) Sharon Walraven

Boys' singles
- (United States) Bjorn Fratangelo

Girls' singles
- (Tunisia) Ons Jabeur

Boys' doubles
- (Spain) Andrés Artuñedo / (Spain) Roberto Carballés

Girls' doubles
- (Russia) Irina Khromacheva / (Ukraine) Maryna Zanevska

Legends under 45 doubles
- (France) Fabrice Santoro / (Australia) Todd Woodbridge

Women's legends doubles
- (United States) Lindsay Davenport / (Switzerland) Martina Hingis

Legends over 45 doubles
- (France) Guy Forget / (France) Henri Leconte
- French Open

The 2011 French Open was a tennis tournament played on outdoor clay courts. It was the 110th edition of the French Open, and the second Grand Slam event of the year. It took place at the Stade Roland Garros in Paris, France, from 22 May to 5 June 2011.

Rafael Nadal successfully defended his 2010 title, defeating rival Roger Federer in the final to win his sixth French Open title. Francesca Schiavone was narrowly unsuccessful in her title defence, being defeated by Li Na in the final. Li became the first female Asian to win a Grand Slam singles title.

== Tournament ==
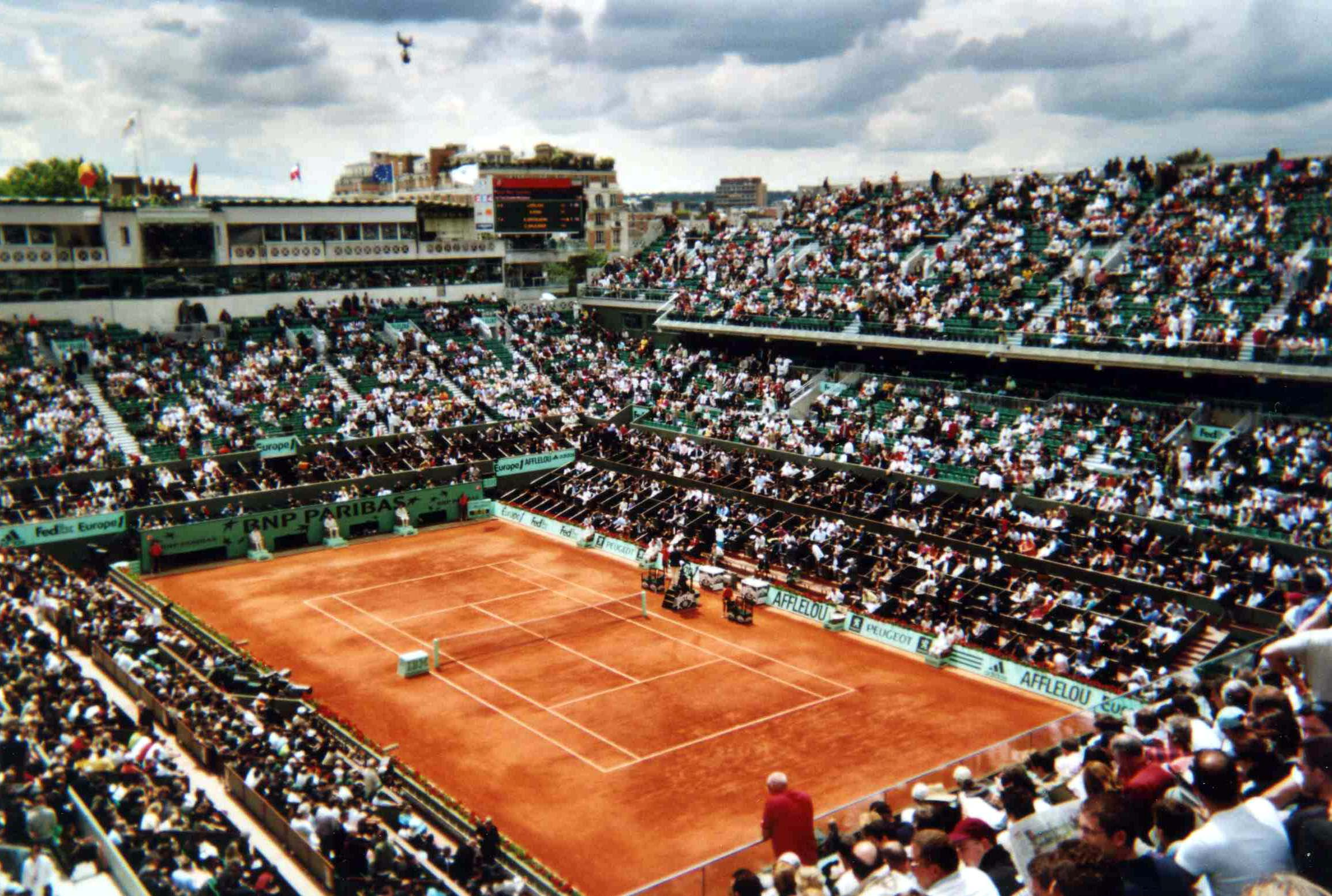
Court Philippe Chatrier where the Finals of the French Open took place.

The 2011 French Open was the one hundred and tenth edition of the French Open. It was held at Stade Roland Garros in Paris. The tournament was an event run by the International Tennis Federation (ITF) and was part of the 2011 ATP World Tour and the 2011 WTA Tour calendars under the Grand Slam category. The tournament consisted of both men's and women's singles and doubles draws as well as a mixed doubles event. There were singles and doubles events for both boys and girls (players under 18), which is part of the Grade A category of tournaments. There were also singles and doubles events for men's and women's wheelchair tennis players as part of the NEC tour under the Grand Slam category. The tournament was played on clay courts. The tournament took place over a series of twenty courts, including the three main showcourts, Court Philippe Chatrier, Court Suzanne Lenglen and Court 1.

== Ranking points ==
=== Senior ranking points ===
Event		W	F	SF	QF	4R	3R	2R	1R	Q	Q3	Q2	Q1
Singles	Points (M)	2000	1200	720	360	180	90	45	10	25	16	8	0
Singles	Points (F)	2000	1400	900	500	280	160	100	5	60	50	40	2
Doubles	Points (M)	2000	1200	720	360	180	90	0	-	-	–	-	-
Doubles	Points (F)	2000	1400	900	500	280	160	5	-	-	-	-	-

=== Junior ranking points ===
Below is a table charting the points that are available to the boys and girls in boy singles and doubles play.

Stage	Boys singles	Boys doubles	Girls singles	Girls doubles
Champion	250	180	250	180
Runner up	180	120	180	120
Semifinals	120	80	120	80
Quarterfinals	80	50	80	50
Round of 16	50	30	50	30
Round of 32	30	–	30	–
Qualifier who loses in first round	25	–	25	–
Qualifying final round	20	–	20	–

=== Wheelchair ranking points ===
Stage	Men's singles	Men's doubles	Women's singles	Women's doubles
Champion	800			
Runner up	500			
Semifinals	375	100	375	100
Quarterfinals	100	–	100	–

== Prize money ==
The total amount of prize money available for the 2011 tournament was €17,520,000. The prize money breakdown was as follows:

Event		W	F	SF	QF	4R	3R	2R	1R	Q3	Q2	Q1
Singles	Prize money	€1,200,000	€600,000	€300,000	€150,000	€75,000	€42,000	€25,000	€15,000	€8,000	€4,000	€2,500
Doubles	Prize money^{*}	€330,000	€165,000	€82,500	€42,000	€22,000	€12,000	€7,500	-	-	-	-
Mixed doubles	Prize money^{*}	€100,000	€50,000	€25,000	€13,000	-	-	€7,000	€3,500	-	-	-

_{* per team}

=== Men's and women's wheelchair singles ===
- Winners: €15,000
- Runners-up: €7,500
- Semi-finalists: €4,000
- Quarter-finalists: €2,500

=== Men's and women's wheelchair doubles ===
- Winners: €5,000
- Runners-up: €2,500
- Semi-finalists: €1,500

== Singles players ==
Men's singles

Champion		Runner-up	
(Spain) Rafael Nadal (1)		(Switzerland) Roger Federer (3)	
Semifinals out
(United Kingdom) Andy Murray (4)		(Serbia) Novak Djokovic (2)	
Quarterfinals out
(Sweden) Robin Söderling (5)	(Argentina) Juan Ignacio Chela	(France) Gaël Monfils (9)	(Italy) Fabio Fognini
4th round out
(Croatia) Ivan Ljubičić	(France) Gilles Simon (18)	(Serbia) Viktor Troicki (15)	(Colombia) Alejandro Falla (Q)
(Spain) David Ferrer (7)	(Switzerland) Stanislas Wawrinka (14)	(Spain) Albert Montañés	(France) Richard Gasquet (13)
3rd round out
(Croatia) Antonio Veić (Q)	(Spain) Fernando Verdasco (16)	(United States) Mardy Fish (10)	(Argentina) Leonardo Mayer (Q)
(Germany) Michael Berrer	(Ukraine) Alexandr Dolgopolov (21)	(Poland) Łukasz Kubot (Q)	(Czech Republic) Lukáš Rosol (Q)
(Ukraine) Sergiy Stakhovsky (31)	(Belgium) Steve Darcis (Q)	(France) Jo-Wilfried Tsonga (17)	(Serbia) Janko Tipsarević (29)
(Spain) Guillermo García López (30)	(Russia) Mikhail Youzhny (12)	(Brazil) Thomaz Bellucci (23)	(Argentina) Juan Martín del Potro (25)
2nd round out
(Spain) Pablo Andújar	(Russia) Nikolay Davydenko (28)	(United States) Sam Querrey (24)	(Belgium) Xavier Malisse
(Netherlands) Robin Haase	(France) Jérémy Chardy	(Cyprus) Marcos Baghdatis (27)	(Spain) Albert Ramos (Q)
(Italy) Simone Bolelli (LL)	(France) Arnaud Clément (WC)	(Austria) Andreas Haider-Maurer	(Germany) Tobias Kamke
(Argentina) Carlos Berlocq (Q)	(Germany) Florian Mayer (20)	(South Africa) Kevin Anderson (32)	(Austria) Jürgen Melzer (8)
(France) Julien Benneteau	(Japan) Kei Nishikori	(Germany) Philipp Petzschner	(France) Guillaume Rufin (WC)
(Netherlands) Thomas Schoorel (Q)	(Russia) Igor Andreev	(Spain) Pere Riba	(France) Maxime Teixeira (WC)
(France) Stéphane Robert (Q)	(Turkey) Marsel İlhan (LL)	(Spain) Rubén Ramírez Hidalgo	(Kazakhstan) Mikhail Kukushkin
(Spain) Marcel Granollers	(Italy) Andreas Seppi	(Slovenia) Blaž Kavčič	(Romania) Victor Hănescu
1st round out
(United States) John Isner	(Colombia) Santiago Giraldo	(Uruguay) Pablo Cuevas	(Germany) Denis Gremelmayr (Q)
(Germany) Philipp Kohlschreiber	(India) Somdev Devvarman	(Russia) Dmitry Tursunov	(Argentina) Juan Mónaco
(Brazil) Ricardo Mello	(Spain) Daniel Gimeno Traver	(Bulgaria) Grigor Dimitrov	(United States) Michael Russell
(Portugal) Frederico Gil	(Germany) Dustin Brown	(Spain) Javier Martí (Q)	(United States) Ryan Harrison (LL)
(France) Éric Prodon (Q)	(Canada) Frank Dancevic (Q)	(Italy) Filippo Volandri	(Canada) Milos Raonic (26)
(Germany) Rainer Schüttler	(United States) Ryan Sweeting	(Belgium) Olivier Rochus	(Germany) Julian Reister
(Spain) Nicolás Almagro (11)	(Australia) Bernard Tomic (WC)	(Italy) Potito Starace	(Russia) Igor Kunitsyn
(France) Nicolas Mahut	(United States) Tim Smyczek (WC)	(France) Édouard Roger-Vasselin (WC)	(Germany) Andreas Beck (LL)
(Finland) Jarkko Nieminen	(Portugal) Rui Machado	(Chinese Taipei) Lu Yen-hsun	(France) David Guez (Q)
(France) Michaël Llodra (22)	(Germany) Mischa Zverev	(France) Adrian Mannarino	(Germany) Björn Phau (Q)
(France) Augustin Gensse (Q)	(Argentina) Máximo González	(France) Florent Serra	(Czech Republic) Jan Hájek
(Argentina) Brian Dabul	(Croatia) Ivan Dodig	(France) Vincent Millot (WC)	(Spain) Feliciano López
(Czech Republic) Tomáš Berdych (6)	(Uzbekistan) Denis Istomin	(Germany) Tommy Haas (PR)	(United States) Robert Kendrick
(Croatia) Marin Čilić (19)	(France) Marc Gicquel (LL)	(Germany) Daniel Brands	(Japan) Go Soeda
(Czech Republic) Radek Štěpánek	(United States) Alex Bogomolov Jr. (LL)	(Russia) Teymuraz Gabashvili	(Kazakhstan) Andrey Golubev
(Croatia) Ivo Karlović (PR)	(Latvia) Ernests Gulbis	(France) Benoît Paire (WC)	(Netherlands) Thiemo de Bakker

Women's singles

Champion		Runner-up	
(China) Li Na (6)		(Italy) Francesca Schiavone (5)	
Semifinals out
(France) Marion Bartoli (11)		(Russia) Maria Sharapova (7)	
Quarterfinals out
(Russia) Svetlana Kuznetsova (13)	(Russia) Anastasia Pavlyuchenkova (14)	(Belarus) Victoria Azarenka (4)	(Germany) Andrea Petkovic (15)
4th round out
(Slovakia) Daniela Hantuchová (28)	(Argentina) Gisela Dulko	(Russia) Vera Zvonareva (3)	(Serbia) Jelena Janković (10)
(Czech Republic) Petra Kvitová (9)	(Russia) Ekaterina Makarova	(Poland) Agnieszka Radwańska (12)	(Russia) Maria Kirilenko (25)
3rd round out
(Denmark) Caroline Wozniacki (1)	(Canada) Rebecca Marino	(Germany) Julia Görges (17)	(Australia) Samantha Stosur (8)
(Australia) Anastasia Rodionova	(Spain) Nuria Llagostera Vives (Q)	(United States) Bethanie Mattek-Sands	(China) Peng Shuai (29)
(Romania) Sorana Cîrstea	(United States) Vania King	(Estonia) Kaia Kanepi (16)	(Italy) Roberta Vinci (30)
(Chinese Taipei) Chan Yung-jan (Q)	(Belgium) Yanina Wickmayer (21)	(Australia) Jarmila Gajdošová (24)	(Netherlands) Arantxa Rus
2nd round out
(Canada) Aleksandra Wozniak (Q)	(Italy) Sara Errani	(Spain) María José Martínez Sánchez	(Romania) Irina-Camelia Begu
(Belarus) Olga Govortsova (Q)	(Czech Republic) Lucie Šafářová	(Bulgaria) Tsvetana Pironkova (32)	(Romania) Simona Halep
(Germany) Sabine Lisicki (Q)	(Romania) Edina Gallovits-Hall	(France) Alizé Cornet	(Germany) Mona Barthel (Q)
(Russia) Vera Dushevina	(United States) Varvara Lepchenko	(Slovenia) Polona Hercog	(Russia) Vesna Dolonts
(Spain) Sílvia Soler Espinosa (Q)	(Romania) Alexandra Dulgheru (27)	(United Kingdom) Elena Baltacha	(China) Zheng Jie
(United Kingdom) Heather Watson (Q)	(Sweden) Johanna Larsson	(France) Iryna Brémond (WC)	(France) Pauline Parmentier (WC)
(France) Caroline Garcia (WC)	(United States) Jill Craybas	(Japan) Ayumi Morita	(India) Sania Mirza
(Czech Republic) Lucie Hradecká	(Spain) Anabel Medina Garrigues	(South Africa) Chanelle Scheepers	(Belgium) Kim Clijsters (2)
1st round out
(Japan) Kimiko Date-Krumm	(Japan) Junri Namigata	(United States) Christina McHale	(China) Zhang Shuai
(Israel) Shahar Pe'er (19)	(Ukraine) Kateryna Bondarenko	(France) Aravane Rezaï	(Slovakia) Magdaléna Rybáriková
(Georgia (country)) Anna Tatishvili	(Hungary) Ágnes Szávay	(Belgium) Kirsten Flipkens	(France) Mathilde Johansson
(Australia) Casey Dellacqua (WC)	(United States) Irina Falconi (WC)	(Russia) Alla Kudryavtseva	(Czech Republic) Iveta Benešová
(Spain) Lourdes Domínguez Lino	(Uzbekistan) Akgul Amanmuradova	(Germany) Angelique Kerber	(Russia) Nadia Petrova (26)
(Russia) Anastasia Pivovarova (LL)	(Czech Republic) Renata Voráčová	(Austria) Sybille Bammer	(Kazakhstan) Yaroslava Shvedova
(Ukraine) Alona Bondarenko	(Australia) Jelena Dokić	(Spain) Arantxa Parra Santonja	(Italy) Flavia Pennetta (18)
(Austria) Tamira Paszek	(France) Olivia Sanchez (WC)	(United Kingdom) Anne Keothavong	(United States) Melanie Oudin
(Czech Republic) Barbora Záhlavová-Strýcová	(Russia) Elena Vesnina	(Switzerland) Patty Schnyder	(Spain) Laura Pous Tió
(Slovakia) Dominika Cibulková (22)	(United States) Sloane Stephens (Q)	(Czech Republic) Sandra Zahlavová	(Hungary) Gréta Arn
(Sweden) Sofia Arvidsson	(France) Stéphanie Foretz Gacon (WC)	(Italy) Romina Oprandi	(Serbia) Ana Ivanovic (20)
(Italy) Alberta Brianti	(Russia) Evgeniya Rodina	(Russia) Ksenia Pervak	(Czech Republic) Andrea Hlaváčková
(Croatia) Mirjana Lučić	(Czech Republic) Zuzana Ondrášková	(Greece) Eleni Daniilidou (Q)	(Czech Republic) Klára Zakopalová (31)
(Romania) Monica Niculescu	(France) Kristina Mladenovic (WC)	(Germany) Kristina Barrois	(Austria) Patricia Mayr-Achleitner
(Serbia) Bojana Jovanovski	(Latvia) Anastasija Sevastova	(Italy) Corinna Dentoni (Q)	(France) Virginie Razzano
(United States) CoCo Vandeweghe	(Ukraine) Viktoriya Kutuzova (PR)	(New Zealand) Marina Erakovic (Q)	(Belarus) Anastasiya Yakimova

== Events ==
=== Seniors ===
==== Men's singles ====
(Spain) Rafael Nadal defeated (Switzerland) Roger Federer 7–5, 7–6^{(7–3)}, 5–7, 6–1

- In the final, Nadal won his sixth French Open title with a victory over the world number three to hold his title. It was Nadal's third title of the year and 46th of his career. It was the first slam he had won this year and the tenth of his career.

==== Women's singles ====
(China) Li Na defeated (Italy) Francesca Schiavone, 6–4, 7–6^{(7–0)}

- In the final Li Na played the defending champion Francesca Schiavone and won in straight sets. In the final tiebreak game Li won 7–0. It was Li's 2nd title of the year and 5th of her career. Li became the first Chinese and the first Asian winner of a singles Grand Slam tennis tournament. It was Li's second Grand Slam final, after she reached the final of the 2011 Australian Open. After her victory Li Na said that "everyone in China will be so excited".

==== Men's doubles ====
(Belarus) Max Mirnyi / (Canada) Daniel Nestor defeated (Colombia) Juan Sebastián Cabal / (Argentina) Eduardo Schwank, 7–6^{(7–3)}, 3–6, 6–4

- Mirnyi and Nestor both won their third French Open men's doubles title; Mirnyi won his fifth Grand Slam men's doubles title, and Nestor his seventh.

==== Women's doubles ====
(Czech Republic) Andrea Hlaváčková / (Czech Republic) Lucie Hradecká defeated (India) Sania Mirza / (Russia) Elena Vesnina, 6–4, 6–3

- Hlaváčková and Hradecká both won their first Grand Slam title.

==== Mixed doubles ====
(Australia) Casey Dellacqua / (United States) Scott Lipsky defeated (Slovenia) Katarina Srebotnik / (Serbia) Nenad Zimonjić, 7–6^{(8–6)}, 4–6, [10–7]

- Dellacqua and Lipsky both won their first Grand Slam title.

=== Juniors ===
==== Boys' singles ====
(United States) Bjorn Fratangelo defeated (Austria) Dominic Thiem, 3–6, 6–3, 8–6

- Fratangelo won his first junior Grand Slam title. He is the first American to win the junior title since John McEnroe's junior title in 1977.

==== Girls' singles ====
(Tunisia) Ons Jabeur defeated (Puerto Rico) Monica Puig, 7–6^{(10–8)}, 6–1

- Jabeur won her first junior Grand Slam title.

==== Boys' doubles ====
(Spain) Andrés Artuñedo / (Spain) Roberto Carballés defeated (United States) Mitchell Krueger / (United States) Shane Vinsant, 5–7, 7–6^{(7–5)}, [10–5]

- Artunedo and Carballes both won their first junior Grand Slam title.

==== Girls' doubles ====
(Russia) Irina Khromacheva / (Ukraine) Maryna Zanevska defeated (Russia) Victoria Kan / (Netherlands) Demi Schuurs, 6–4, 7–5

- Khromacheva won her first junior Grand Slam doubles title, and Zanevska won her second.

=== Wheelchair events ===
==== Wheelchair men's singles ====
(Netherlands) Maikel Scheffers defeated (France) Nicolas Peifer, 7–6^{(7–3)}, 6–3

- Scheffers won his first Grand Slam title.

==== Wheelchair women's singles ====
(Netherlands) Esther Vergeer defeated (Netherlands) Marjolein Buis, 6–0, 6–2

- Vergeer won her fifth consecutive French Open singles title and her 18th Grand Slam singles title.

==== Wheelchair men's doubles ====
(Japan) Shingo Kunieda / (France) Nicolas Peifer defeated (Netherlands) Robin Ammerlaan / (Sweden) Stefan Olsson, 6–2, 6–3

- Kunieda won his third French Open doubles title, and tenth Grand Slam doubles title.
- Peifer won his first Grand Slam title.

==== Wheelchair women's doubles ====
(Netherlands) Esther Vergeer / (Netherlands) Sharon Walraven defeated (Netherlands) Jiske Griffioen / (Netherlands) Aniek van Koot, 5–7, 6–4, [10–5]

- Vergeer won her fourth French Open doubles title, and 17th Grand Slam doubles title.
- Walraven won her fourth consecutive Grand Slam title.

=== Other events ===
==== Legends under 45 doubles ====
(France) Fabrice Santoro / (Australia) Todd Woodbridge defeated (France) Arnaud Boetsch / (France) Cédric Pioline, 6–2, 6–4

==== Legends over 45 doubles ====
(France) Guy Forget / (France) Henri Leconte defeated (Ecuador) Andrés Gómez / (United States) John McEnroe, 6–3, 5–7, [10–8]

==== Women's legends doubles ====
(United States) Lindsay Davenport / (Switzerland) Martina Hingis defeated (United States) Martina Navratilova / (Czech Republic) Jana Novotná, 6–1, 6–2

== Singles seeds ==
The following are the seeded players and notable players who withdrew from the event. Rankings are as of 16 May 2011 and the Points are as of 23 May 2011. For the first time since the 2006 French Open, the top four seeds all made it to the semifinals.

=== Men's singles ===
Seed	Rank	Player	Points	Points defending	Points won	New points	Status
1	1	(Spain) Rafael Nadal	12070	2000	2000	12070	Champion, defeated (Switzerland) Roger Federer [3]
2	2	(Serbia) Novak Djokovic	11665	360	720	12025	Semifinal lost to (Switzerland) Roger Federer [3]
3	3	(Switzerland) Roger Federer	8390	360	1200	9230	Runner-Up, lost to (Spain) Rafael Nadal [1]
4	4	(United Kingdom) Andy Murray	6085	180	720	6625	Semifinal lost to (Spain) Rafael Nadal [1]
5	5	(Sweden) Robin Söderling	5435	1200	360	4595	Quarterfinals lost to (Spain) Rafael Nadal [1]
6	6	(Czech Republic) Tomáš Berdych	4200	720	10	3490	First round lost to (France) Stéphane Robert
7	7	(Spain) David Ferrer	4060	90	180	4150	Fourth round lost to (France) Gaël Monfils [9]
8	8	(Austria) Jürgen Melzer	2850	720	45	2175	Second round lost to (Czech Republic) Lukáš Rosol
9	9	(France) Gaël Monfils	2465	45	360	2780	Quarterfinals lost to (Switzerland) Roger Federer [3]
10	10	(United States) Mardy Fish	2395	45	90	2440	Third round lost to (France) Gilles Simon [18]
11	12	(Spain) Nicolás Almagro	2225	360	10	1875	First round lost (Poland) Łukasz Kubot
12	13	(Russia) Mikhail Youzhny	2010	360	90	1740	Third round lost to (Spain) Albert Montañés
13	14	(France) Richard Gasquet	1755	10	180	1925	Fourth round lost to (Serbia) Novak Djokovic [2]
14	15	(Switzerland) Stanislas Wawrinka	1920	180	180	1920	Fourth round lost to (Switzerland) Roger Federer [3]
15	16	(Serbia) Viktor Troicki	1840	90	180	1930	Fourth round lost to (United Kingdom) Andy Murray [4]
16	17	(Spain) Fernando Verdasco	1515	180	90	1425	Third round lost to (Croatia) Ivan Ljubičić
17	18	(France) Jo-Wilfried Tsonga	1570	180	90	1480	Third round lost to (Switzerland) Stanislas Wawrinka [14]
18	19	(France) Gilles Simon	1565	0	180	1745	Fourth round lost to (Sweden) Robin Söderling [5]
19	20	(Croatia) Marin Čilić	1515	180	10	1345	First round lost to (Spain) Rubén Ramírez Hidalgo
20	21	(Germany) Florian Mayer	1555	0	45	1600	Second round lost to (Colombia) Alejandro Falla
21	23	(Ukraine) Alexandr Dolgopolov	1450	90	90	1450	Third round lost to (Serbia) Viktor Troicki [15]
22	24	(France) Michaël Llodra	1400	10	10	1400	First round lost to (Belgium) Steve Darcis
23	25	(Brazil) Thomaz Bellucci	1395	180	90	1305	Third round lost to (France) Richard Gasquet [13]
24	26	(United States) Sam Querrey	1325	10	45	1360	Second round lost to (Croatia) Ivan Ljubičić
25	27	(Argentina) Juan Martín del Potro	1355	0	90	1445	Third round lost to (Serbia) Novak Djokovic [2]
26	28	(Canada) Milos Raonic	1342	0	10	1352	First round lost to (Germany) Michael Berrer
27	29	(Cyprus) Marcos Baghdatis	1295	90	45	1250	Second round vs (Argentina) Leonardo Mayer
28	30	(Russia) Nikolay Davydenko	1285	0	45	1330	Second round lost to (Croatia) Antonio Veić
29	32	(Serbia) Janko Tipsarević	1225	10	90	1305	Third round lost to (Switzerland) Roger Federer [3]
30	33	(Spain) Guillermo García López	1205	45	90	1250	Third round lost to (Italy) Fabio Fognini
31	34	(Ukraine) Sergiy Stakhovsky	1145	10	90	1225	Third round lost to (Spain) David Ferrer [7]
32	35	(South Africa) Kevin Anderson	1150	10	45	1185	Second round lost to (Argentina) Juan Ignacio Chela

=== Withdrawn players ===
Rank	Player	Points	Points defending	Points won	New points	Withdrew due to
11	(United States) Andy Roddick	2290	90	0	2200	right shoulder injury
22	(Argentina) David Nalbandian	1425	0	0	1425	illness
31	(Spain) Tommy Robredo	1245	10	0	1235	Left leg Injury

=== Women's singles ===
Seed	Rank	Player	Points	Points defending	Points won	New points	Status
1	1	(Denmark) Caroline Wozniacki	10255	500	160	9915	Third round lost to (Slovakia) Daniela Hantuchová [28]
2	2	(Belgium) Kim Clijsters	8115	0	100	8215	Second round lost to (Netherlands) Arantxa Rus
3	3	(Russia) Vera Zvonareva	7755	100	280	7935	Fourth round lost to (Russia) Anastasia Pavlyuchenkova [14]
4	4	(Belarus) Victoria Azarenka	5425	5	500	5920	Quarterfinals lost to (China) Li Na [6]
5	5	(Italy) Francesca Schiavone	5246	2000	1400	4646	Runner-up, lost to (China) Li Na [6]
6	6	(China) Li Na	4635	160	2000	6475	Champion, defeated (Italy) Francesca Schiavone [5]
7	7	(Russia) Maria Sharapova	4481	160	900	5221	Semifinal lost to (China) Li Na [6]
8	8	(Australia) Samantha Stosur	4645	1400	160	3405	Third round lost to (Argentina) Gisela Dulko
9	9	(Czech Republic) Petra Kvitová	3743	5	280	4018	Fourth round lost to (China) Li Na [6]
10	10	(Serbia) Jelena Janković	3670	900	280	3050	Fourth round lost to (Italy) Francesca Schiavone [5]
11	11	(France) Marion Bartoli	3000	160	900	3740	Semifinal lost to (Italy) Francesca Schiavone [5]
12	12	(Poland) Agnieszka Radwańska	2876	100	280	3056	Fourth round lost to (Russia) Maria Sharapova [7]
13	13	(Russia) Svetlana Kuznetsova	2870	160	500	3210	Quarterfinals lost to (France) Marion Bartoli [11]
14	14	(Russia) Anastasia Pavlyuchenkova	2715	160	500	3055	Quarterfinals lost to (Italy) Francesca Schiavone [5]
15	15	(Germany) Andrea Petkovic	2890	100	500	3290	Quarterfinals lost to (Russia) Maria Sharapova [7]
16	16	(Estonia) Kaia Kanepi	2540	160	160	2540	Third round lost to (Russia) Ekaterina Makarova
17	18	(Germany) Julia Görges	2500	100	160	2560	Third round lost to (France) Marion Bartoli [11]
18	19	(Italy) Flavia Pennetta	2495	280	5	2220	First round lost to (United States) Varvara Lepchenko
19	20	(Israel) Shahar Pe'er	2445	280	5	2170	First round lost to (Spain) María José Martínez Sánchez
20	21	(Serbia) Ana Ivanovic	2425	100	5	2330	First round lost to (Sweden) Johanna Larsson
21	22	(Belgium) Yanina Wickmayer	2350	160	160	2350	Third round lost to (Poland) Agnieszka Radwańska [12]
22	23	(Slovakia) Dominika Cibulková	2210	160	5	2055	First round lost (United States) Vania King
23	24	~~(Russia) Alisa Kleybanova~~	~~2165~~	~~160~~	~~0~~	~~2005~~	~~withdrew due to Illness~~
24	25	(Australia) Jarmila Gajdošová	2060	280	160	1940	Third round lost to (Germany) Andrea Petkovic [15]
25	26	(Russia) Maria Kirilenko	1985	280	280	1985	Fourth round lost to (Germany) Andrea Petkovic [15]
26	27	(Russia) Nadia Petrova	1940	500	5	1445	First round lost to (Australia) Anastasia Rodionova
27	28	(Romania) Alexandra Dulgheru	1515	160	100	1455	Second round lost to (Romania) Sorana Cîrstea
28	30	(Slovakia) Daniela Hantuchová	1875	280	280	1875	Fourth round lost to (Russia) Svetlana Kuznetsova [13]
29	31	(China) Peng Shuai	2080	0	160	2240	Third round lost to (Italy) Francesca Schiavone [5]
30	32	(Italy) Roberta Vinci	1615	100	160	1675	Third round lost to (Belarus) Victoria Azarenka [4]
31	33	(Czech Republic) Klára Zakopalová	1600	100	5	1505	First round lost to (Chinese Taipei) Chan Yung-jan
32	34	(Bulgaria) Tsvetana Pironkova	1463	5	100	1558	Second round lost to (Argentina) Gisela Dulko

=== Withdrawn players ===
Rank	Player	Points	Points defending	Points won	New points	Withdrew due to
17	(United States) Serena Williams	2500	500	0	2000	Pulmonary embolism
24	(Russia) Alisa Kleybanova	2165	160	0	2005	Illness
29	(United States) Venus Williams	1840	280	0	1560	hip injury

== Wildcard entries ==
Below are the lists of the wildcard awardees entering in the main draws.

=== Men's singles wildcard entries ===
1. (United States) Tim Smyczek
2. (Australia) Bernard Tomic
3. (France) Arnaud Clément
4. (France) Benoît Paire
5. (France) Maxime Teixeira
6. (France) Édouard Roger-Vasselin
7. (France) Guillaume Rufin
8. (France) Vincent Millot

=== Women's singles wildcard entries ===
1. (Australia) Casey Dellacqua
2. (United States) Irina Falconi
3. (France) Pauline Parmentier
4. (France) Caroline Garcia
5. (France) Kristina Mladenovic
6. (France) Iryna Brémond
7. (France) Stéphanie Foretz Gacon
8. (France) Olivia Sanchez

=== Men's doubles wildcard entries ===
1. (France) Kenny de Schepper / (France) Albano Olivetti
2. (France) Jérémy Chardy / (France) Arnaud Clément
3. (France) Gaël Monfils / (France) Josselin Ouanna
4. (France) Marc Gicquel / (France) Édouard Roger-Vasselin
5. (France) Pierre-Hugues Herbert / (France) Nicolas Renavand
6. (France) Guillaume Rufin / (France) Alexandre Sidorenko
7. (France) Olivier Patience / (France) Éric Prodon

=== Women's doubles wildcard entries ===
1. (France) Julie Coin / (France) Mathilde Johansson
2. (France) Irena Pavlovic / (France) Laura Thorpe
3. (France) Caroline Garcia / (France) Aurélie Védy
4. (France) Kristina Mladenovic / (France) Pauline Parmentier
5. (France) Claire Feuerstein / (France) Stéphanie Foretz Gacon
6. (France) Victoria Larrière / (France) Alizé Lim
7. (France) Audrey Bergot / (France) Iryna Brémond

=== Mixed doubles wildcard entries ===
1. (France) Julie Coin / (France) Nicolas Mahut
2. (France) Alizé Cornet / (France) Gilles Simon
3. ~~(France) Alizé Lim~~ / ~~(France) Richard Gasquet~~ (withdrew to focus on Gasquet's singles match)
4. ~~(France) Amélie Mauresmo~~ / ~~(France) Michaël Llodra~~ (withdrew)
5. (France) Virginie Razzano / (Belgium) Dick Norman
6. (France) Aravane Rezaï / (Bulgaria) Grigor Dimitrov

== Protected ranking ==
The following players were accepted directly into the main draw using a protected ranking:

Men's singles

- (Germany) Tommy Haas
- (Croatia) Ivo Karlović

Women's singles

- (Ukraine) Viktoriya Kutuzova

== Qualifiers entries ==
=== Men's singles qualifiers entries ===
1. (Canada) Frank Dancevic
2. (Belgium) Steve Darcis
3. (Colombia) Alejandro Falla
4. (France) Augustin Gensse
5. (Germany) Denis Gremelmayr
6. (France) David Guez
7. (Poland) Łukasz Kubot
8. (Spain) Javier Martí
9. (Argentina) Leonardo Mayer
10. (Germany) Björn Phau
11. (France) Éric Prodon
12. (Spain) Albert Ramos
13. (France) Stéphane Robert
14. (Czech Republic) Lukáš Rosol
15. (Netherlands) Thomas Schoorel
16. (Croatia) Antonio Veić

The following players received entry from a lucky loser spot:

1. (Germany) Andreas Beck
2. (United States) Alex Bogomolov Jr.
3. (Italy) Simone Bolelli
4. (France) Marc Gicquel
5. (United States) Ryan Harrison
6. (Turkey) Marsel İlhan

=== Women's singles qualifiers entries ===
1. (Germany) Mona Barthel
2. (Chinese Taipei) Chan Yung-jan
3. (Greece) Eleni Daniilidou
4. (Italy) Corinna Dentoni
5. (New Zealand) Marina Erakovic
6. (Belarus) Olga Govortsova
7. (Germany) Sabine Lisicki
8. (Spain) Nuria Llagostera Vives
9. (Spain) Sílvia Soler Espinosa
10. (United States) Sloane Stephens
11. (United Kingdom) Heather Watson
12. (Canada) Aleksandra Wozniak

The following player received entry from a lucky loser spot:

1. (Russia) Anastasia Pivovarova

== Withdrawals ==
The following players were accepted directly into the main tournament, but withdrew with injuries.

Men's singles

- (Germany) Benjamin Becker → replaced by (United States) Ryan Harrison
- (Lithuania) Ričardas Berankis → replaced by (Turkey) Marsel İlhan
- (Spain) Juan Carlos Ferrero → replaced by (Germany) Andreas Beck
- (Chile) Fernando González → replaced by (Argentina) Brian Dabul
- (Australia) Lleyton Hewitt → replaced by (France) Marc Gicquel
- (France) Paul-Henri Mathieu → replaced by (Czech Republic) Jan Hájek
- (Argentina) David Nalbandian → replaced by (Germany) Daniel Brands
- (Spain) Tommy Robredo → replaced by (United States) Alex Bogomolov Jr.
- (United States) Andy Roddick → replaced by (Italy) Simone Bolelli

Women's singles

- (Switzerland) Timea Bacsinszky → replaced by (Georgia (country)) Anna Tatishvili
- (Russia) Anna Chakvetadze → replaced by (Russia) Vesna Dolonts
- (Russia) Alisa Kleybanova → replaced by (Russia) Anastasia Pivovarova
- (Russia) Dinara Safina → replaced by (United Kingdom) Anne Keothavong
- (United States) Serena Williams → replaced by (Japan) Junri Namigata
- (United States) Venus Williams → replaced by (Ukraine) Kateryna Bondarenko

Preceded by 2011 Australian Open	Grand Slams	Succeeded by 2011 Wimbledon
