= 2011 Swiss Indoors =

- Date: 31 October – 6 November
- Edition: 42nd
- Category: ATP World Tour 500
- Draw: 32S / 16D
- Prize money: €1,308,100
- Location: Basel, Switzerland
- Venue: St. Jakobshalle

Champions

Singles
- (Switzerland) Roger Federer

Doubles
- (France) Michaël Llodra / (Serbia) Nenad Zimonjić
← 2010 ·	Swiss Indoors	· 2012 →

The 2011 Swiss Indoors was a men's tennis tournament played on indoor hard courts. It was the 42nd edition of the event known that year as the Swiss Indoors, and was part of the 500 series of the 2011 ATP World Tour. It was held at the St. Jakobshalle in Basel, Switzerland, from 31 October through 6 November 2011. Roger Federer won the singles title.

== Finals ==
=== Singles ===
(Switzerland) Roger Federer defeated (Japan) Kei Nishikori, 6–1, 6–3

- It was Federer's 2nd title of the year and 68th of his career. It was his 5th win at Basel, also winning in 2006, 2007, 2008, and 2010.

=== Doubles ===
(France) Michaël Llodra / (Serbia) Nenad Zimonjić defeated (Belarus) Max Mirnyi / (Canada) Daniel Nestor, 6–4, 7–5

== ATP players ==
=== Seeds ===
Country	Player	Rank^{1}	Seed
SRB	Novak Djokovic	1	1
GBR	Andy Murray	3	2
SUI	Roger Federer	4	3
CZE	Tomáš Berdych	7	4
USA	Mardy Fish	8	5
SRB	Janko Tipsarević	13	6
USA	Andy Roddick	14	7
SRB	Viktor Troicki	17	8

- Seeds are based on the rankings of October 24, 2011

=== Other entrants ===
The following players received wildcards into the singles main draw:

- (United Kingdom) Andy Murray
- (Japan) Kei Nishikori
- (United States) Donald Young

The following players received entry from the qualifying draw:

- (United States) James Blake
- (Germany) Tobias Kamke
- (Poland) Łukasz Kubot
- (Switzerland) Michael Lammer

The following players received entry from a lucky loser spot:

- (Switzerland) Marco Chiudinelli
- (Kazakhstan) Mikhail Kukushkin
