= 2011 French Open – Women's singles qualifying =

Women's singles qualifying
- 2011 French Open

Events
Singles	men	women		boys	girls
Doubles	men	women	mixed	boys	girls
WC Singles	men	women	quad
WC Doubles	men	women	quad
Legends	−45	45+	women

Qualification
Singles	men	women
- French Open

== Seeds ==
1. (Russia) Anastasia Pivovarova (qualifying competition, lucky loser)
2. (Czech Republic) Petra Cetkovská (qualifying competition)
3. (Croatia) Petra Martić (first round)
4. (Spain) Nuria Llagostera Vives (qualified)
5. (Austria) Yvonne Meusburger (second round)
6. (United Kingdom) Heather Watson (qualified)
7. (Italy) Maria Elena Camerin (second round)
8. (Germany) Sabine Lisicki (qualified)
9. (United States) Jamie Hampton (qualifying competition)
10. (Belarus) Olga Govortsova (qualified)
11. (Ukraine) Lesia Tsurenko (first round)
12. (Czech Republic) Eva Birnerová (first round)
13. (Chinese Taipei) Chan Yung-jan (qualified)
14. (Japan) Misaki Doi (second round)
15. (Japan) Kurumi Nara (second round)
16. (Australia) Sophie Ferguson (second round)
17. (Slovakia) Zuzana Kučová (first round)
18. (Poland) Urszula Radwańska (first round)
19. (China) Han Xinyun (first round)
20. (Russia) Valeria Savinykh (first round)
21. (United States) Sloane Stephens (qualified)
22. (Germany) Kathrin Wörle (second round)
23. (Russia) Alexandra Panova (first round)
24. (Chinese Taipei) Chang Kai-chen (second round)

== Qualifiers ==
1. (United States) Sloane Stephens
2. (New Zealand) Marina Erakovic
3. (Chinese Taipei) Chan Yung-jan
4. (Spain) Nuria Llagostera Vives
5. (Italy) Corinna Dentoni
6. (United Kingdom) Heather Watson
7. (Germany) Mona Barthel
8. (Germany) Sabine Lisicki
9. (Canada) Aleksandra Wozniak
10. (Belarus) Olga Govortsova
11. (Greece) Eleni Daniilidou
12. (Spain) Silvia Soler Espinosa

== Lucky losers ==
1. (Russia) Anastasia Pivovarova

== Qualifying draw ==
Key

- Q = Qualifier
- WC = Wild card
- LL = Lucky loser
- Alt = Alternate
- ITF = ITF entry
- PR = Protected ranking
- SR = Special ranking
- SE = Special exempt
- JE = Junior exempt
- JR = Junior Accelerator Programme entrant
- CO = College Accelerator Programme entrant
- NG = Next Gen Accelerator Program entrant
- w/o = Walkover
- r = Retired
- d = Defaulted

=== First qualifier ===
First round
1	(Russia) Anastasia Pivovarova	6	6
WC	(Ukraine) Elina Svitolina	1	4
(Romania) Alexandra Cadanţu	6	1	6
(Romania) Mădălina Gojnea	2	6	2
WC	(France) Anaïs Laurendon	2	2
(United States) Julia Cohen	6	6
WC	(France) Séverine Beltrame	1	3
21	(United States) Sloane Stephens	6	6

Second round
1	(Russia) Anastasia Pivovarova	4	6	6
(Romania) Alexandra Cadanţu	6	0	4
(United States) Julia Cohen	0	3
21	(United States) Sloane Stephens	6	6

Qualifying competition
1	(Russia) Anastasia Pivovarova	3	4
21	(United States) Sloane Stephens	6	6

=== Second qualifier ===
First round
2	(Czech Republic) Petra Cetkovská	6	7
(Russia) Arina Rodionova	1	5
WC	(France) Claire Feuerstein	6	5	6
(Russia) Nina Bratchikova	3	7	2
(New Zealand) Marina Erakovic	6	7
(Croatia) Ajla Tomljanović	4	5
(Ukraine) Tetiana Luzhanska	3	6	6
15	(Japan) Kurumi Nara	6	2	8

Second round
2	(Czech Republic) Petra Cetkovská	7	6
WC	(France) Claire Feuerstein	5	3
(New Zealand) Marina Erakovic	6	6
15	(Japan) Kurumi Nara	0	0

Qualifying competition
2	(Czech Republic) Petra Cetkovská	4	2
(New Zealand) Marina Erakovic	6	6

=== Third qualifier ===
First round
3	(Croatia) Petra Martić	3	2
(Romania) Liana Ungur	6	6
(Ukraine) Yulia Beygelzimer	6	6
(Argentina) Florencia Molinero	3	2
(Slovakia) Lenka Juríková	2	6^{6}
(Ukraine) Mariya Koryttseva	6	7^{8}
(Japan) Kumiko Iijima	2	4
13	(Chinese Taipei) Chan Yung-jan	6	6

Second round
(Romania) Liana Ungur	6	7^{8}
(Ukraine) Yulia Beygelzimer	4	6^{6}
(Ukraine) Mariya Koryttseva	2	7	7
13	(Chinese Taipei) Chan Yung-jan	6	5	9

Qualifying competition
(Romania) Liana Ungur	4	0
13	(Chinese Taipei) Chan Yung-jan	6	6

=== Fourth qualifier ===
First round
4	(Spain) Nuria Llagostera Vives	1	6	6
(Spain) Beatriz García Vidagany	6	2	3
(Germany) Tatjana Malek	7	5	3
(France) Laura Thorpe	5	7	6
(Georgia (country)) Oksana Kalashnikova	6	6
(Kazakhstan) Zarina Diyas	4	1
(Canada) Stéphanie Dubois	7	4	6
23	(Russia) Alexandra Panova	5	6	2

Second round
4	(Spain) Nuria Llagostera Vives	6	6
(France) Laura Thorpe	1	3
(Georgia (country)) Oksana Kalashnikova	4	6^{5}
(Canada) Stéphanie Dubois	6	7^{7}

Qualifying competition
4	(Spain) Nuria Llagostera Vives	1	7^{7}	6
(Canada) Stéphanie Dubois	6	6^{3}	1

=== Fifth qualifier ===
First round
5	(Austria) Yvonne Meusburger	6	3	6
(Netherlands) Kiki Bertens	4	6	3
(Italy) Corinna Dentoni	7	7^{7}
(Luxembourg) Anne Kremer	5	6^{5}
(Russia) Ekaterina Bychkova	3	7^{7}	10
(United States) Lindsay Lee-Waters	6	6^{1}	8
(Greece) Eirini Georgatou	6	6
17	(Slovakia) Zuzana Kučová	4	4

Second round
5	(Austria) Yvonne Meusburger	3	4
(Italy) Corinna Dentoni	6	6
(Russia) Ekaterina Bychkova	6	6
(Greece) Eirini Georgatou	3	2

Qualifying competition
(Italy) Corinna Dentoni	6	6
(Russia) Ekaterina Bychkova	3	2

=== Sixth qualifier ===
First round
6	(United Kingdom) Heather Watson	6	6
(Romania) Ioana Raluca Olaru	3	0
(Canada) Heidi El Tabakh	5	3
(Australia) Sally Peers	7	6
(Argentina) María Irigoyen	5	0^{r}
(Switzerland) Stefanie Vögele	7	3
(Japan) Erika Sema	6	1	3
14	(Japan) Misaki Doi	3	6	6

Second round
6	(United Kingdom) Heather Watson	6	7
(Australia) Sally Peers	3	5
(Switzerland) Stefanie Vögele	4	6	6
14	(Japan) Misaki Doi	6	1	3

Qualifying competition
6	(United Kingdom) Heather Watson	6	6
(Switzerland) Stefanie Vögele	4	4

=== Seventh qualifier ===
First round
7	(Italy) Maria Elena Camerin	0	6	6
(France) Nathalie Piquion	6	3	4
(Russia) Regina Kulikova	7	6
(Australia) Olivia Rogowska	5	3
(Germany) Laura Siegemund	7^{8}	7^{7}
(Slovakia) Kristína Kučová	6^{6}	6^{2}
(Germany) Mona Barthel	7^{7}	7
20	(Russia) Valeria Savinykh	6^{5}	5

Second round
7	(Italy) Maria Elena Camerin	5	5
(Russia) Regina Kulikova	7	7
(Germany) Laura Siegemund	3	1
(Germany) Mona Barthel	6	6

Qualifying competition
(Russia) Regina Kulikova	5	3
(Germany) Mona Barthel	7	6

=== Eighth qualifier ===
First round
8	(Germany) Sabine Lisicki	6	6
(Spain) Lara Arruabarrena-Vecino	3	2
(Turkey) Çağla Büyükakçay	4	3
(Ukraine) Olga Savchuk	6	6
(Romania) Elena Bogdan	4	6	6
(Portugal) Michelle Larcher de Brito	6	2	4
(United States) Madison Brengle	2	3
16	(Australia) Sophie Ferguson	6	6

Second round
8	(Germany) Sabine Lisicki	6	6
(Ukraine) Olga Savchuk	3	4
(Romania) Elena Bogdan	6	6
16	(Australia) Sophie Ferguson	1	3

Qualifying competition
8	(Germany) Sabine Lisicki	6	6
(Romania) Elena Bogdan	3	3

=== Ninth qualifier ===
First round
9	(United States) Jamie Hampton	6	6^{7}	6
WC	(France) Irena Pavlovic	2	7^{9}	3
(Italy) Anna Floris	7	0
(Belarus) Darya Kustova	5	0^{r}
(China) Lu Jingjing	0	5
(Canada) Aleksandra Wozniak	6	7
(Russia) Ekaterina Ivanova	6	2	4
22	(Germany) Kathrin Wörle	3	6	6

Second round
9	(United States) Jamie Hampton	7	3	6
(Italy) Anna Floris	5	6	4
(Canada) Aleksandra Wozniak	6	6
22	(Germany) Kathrin Wörle	2	3

Qualifying competition
9	(United States) Jamie Hampton	5	3
(Canada) Aleksandra Wozniak	7	6

=== Tenth qualifier ===
First round
10	(Belarus) Olga Govortsova	6	6
WC	(France) Julie Coin	1	2
(Czech Republic) Kristýna Plíšková	3	6	3
(Hong Kong) Zhang Ling	6	3	6
(South Korea) Lee Jin-a	5	3
(Kazakhstan) Sesil Karatantcheva	7	6
(Netherlands) Michaëlla Krajicek	6	3	6
19	(China) Han Xinyun	4	6	2

Second round
10	(Belarus) Olga Govortsova	4	6	6
(Hong Kong) Zhang Ling	6	4	2
(Kazakhstan) Sesil Karatantcheva	2	6	6
(Netherlands) Michaëlla Krajicek	6	1	4

Qualifying competition
10	(Belarus) Olga Govortsova	6	2	6
(Kazakhstan) Sesil Karatantcheva	4	6	3

=== Eleventh qualifier ===
First round
11	(Ukraine) Lesia Tsurenko	2	6	1
(Slovenia) Maša Zec Peškirič	6	1	6
WC	(France) Audrey Bergot	0	1
(Greece) Eleni Daniilidou	6	6
(Poland) Magda Linette	6	6
WC	(France) Claire de Gubernatis	4	3
(Luxembourg) Mandy Minella	6	7
18	(Poland) Urszula Radwańska	2	5

Second round
(Slovenia) Maša Zec Peškirič	4	4
(Greece) Eleni Daniilidou	6	6
(Poland) Magda Linette	6^{4}	4
(Luxembourg) Mandy Minella	7^{7}	6

Qualifying competition
(Greece) Eleni Daniilidou	7^{8}	6
(Luxembourg) Mandy Minella	6^{6}	3

=== Twelfth qualifier ===
First round
12	(Czech Republic) Eva Birnerová	1	6^{3}
(Russia) Vitalia Diatchenko	6	7^{7}
(Thailand) Noppawan Lertcheewakarn	3	6	1
(Czech Republic) Karolína Plíšková	6	3	6
(Spain) Silvia Soler Espinosa	6	3	6
(Israel) Julia Glushko	4	6	1
(Bulgaria) Elitsa Kostova	2	3
24	(Chinese Taipei) Chang Kai-chen	6	6

Second round
(Russia) Vitalia Diatchenko	6	6
(Czech Republic) Karolína Plíšková	1	2
(Spain) Silvia Soler Espinosa	6	7
24	(Chinese Taipei) Chang Kai-chen	2	5

Qualifying competition
(Russia) Vitalia Diatchenko	4	3
(Spain) Silvia Soler Espinosa	6	6
