= 2011 French Open – Day-by-day summaries =

This list is a below in a form of day-by-day summaries:

== Day 1 (22 May) ==
On the opening day of the tournament, the former world No. 1 Lleyton Hewitt withdrew due to an ankle injury and was replaced by lucky loser Marc Gicquel, who fell to Albert Montañés. No.19 seed Marin Čilić was upset by Rubén Ramírez Hidalgo with a 7–6, 6–4, 6–4 scoreline. David Ferrer secured a straight-set victory over Jarkko Nieminen losing only seven games. Meanwhile, nine of the 20 Frenchmen to start in this year's main draw were in action on Sunday, with four of them taking victory including 17th seed Jo-Wilfried Tsonga. Andreas Seppi, Fabio Fognini and Kei Nishikori all moved safely into the second round.

The women's tournament kicked off on Sunday with a solid win by 2010 runner-up Samantha Stosur. She was joined by No. 10 seed and three-time semi-finalist Jelena Janković, former champion Svetlana Kuznetsova, no. 14 seed Anastasia Pavlyuchenkova and no. 17 Julia Görges. Upsets of the day saw María José Martínez Sánchez defeat No 19 Shahar Pe'er 7–6, 6–1, and Varvara Lepchenko upsetting Flavia Pennetta. Bethanie Mattek-Sands, the highest-ranked American in the tournament due to the absence of the Williams sisters, came back to best Arantxa Parra Santonja, 2–6, 7–6, 6–3. There was also an emotional win by France's Alizé Cornet who wore a black ribbon on her dress in her 6–4, 6–2 win over Renata Voráčová as a tribute to Stephane Vidal, the coach and fiancé of fellow French player Virginie Razzano, who just died due to a brain tumor.

- Seeds out:
  - Men's Singles: (Croatia) Marin Čilić [19]
  - Women's Singles: (Italy) Flavia Pennetta [18], (Israel) Shahar Pe'er [19]
- Schedule of Play

Matches on main courts
Matches on Court Philippe Chatrier (Center Court)
Event	Winner	Loser	Score
Women's Singles 1st round	(Australia) Samantha Stosur [8]	(Czech Republic) Iveta Benešová	6–2, 6–3
Men's Singles 1st round	(Spain) David Ferrer [7]	(Finland) Jarkko Nieminen	6–3, 6–3, 6–1
Men's Singles 1st round	(France) Jo-Wilfried Tsonga [17]	(Czech Republic) Jan Hájek	6–3, 6–2, 6–2
Women's Singles 1st round	(Germany) Julia Görges [17]	(France) Mathilde Johansson	6–1, 6–4
Matches on Court Suzanne Lenglen (Grandstand)
Event	Winner	Loser	Score
Women's Singles 1st round	(France) Alizé Cornet	(Czech Republic) Renata Voráčová	6–4, 6–2
Men's Singles 1st round	(Spain) Albert Montañés	(France) Marc Gicquel [LL]	6–4, 6–4, 6–2
Women's Singles 1st round	(Serbia) Jelena Janković [10]	(Ukraine) Alona Bondarenko	6–3, 6–1
Men's Singles 1st round	(France) Julien Benneteau	(Portugal) Rui Machado	4–6, 6–1, 6–2, 6–0

== Day 2 (23 May) ==
Novak Djokovic played near perfect tennis in routing Thiemo de Bakker 6–2, 6–1, 6–3 in the first round. Argentine Juan Martín del Potro took out Ivo Karlović 6–7, 6–3, 7–5, 6–4. Though most seeds did well France's Stéphane Robert shocked no. 6 seed and 2010 semifinalist Tomáš Berdych with a 3–6, 3–6, 6–2, 6–2, 9–7 win, and no. 22 seed Michaël Llodra fell to Belgium's Steve Darcis 6–7, 6–3, 6–3, 6–3. France's Richard Gasquet beat Radek Štěpánek 7–5, 6–3, 6–0, and seeds Thomaz Bellucci, Nikolay Davydenko, Gaël Monfils, Janko Tipsarević, Mikhail Youzhny, Viktor Troicki and Mardy Fish also won their matches.

Caroline Wozniacki crushed Japan's Kimiko Date-Krumm 6–0, 6–2 in exactly one hour. Other seeds moving on in the draw included no. 9 seed Petra Kvitová and no. 12 seed Agnieszka Radwańska. The highest women's seed lost this day was Nadia Petrova who fell to her doubles partner and Aussie Anastasia Rodionova 7–6, 3–6, 4–6. Also no. 31 seed Klára Zakopalová lost to Chan Yung-jan 5–7, 1–6. The third-seeded Russian Vera Zvonareva, Sania Mirza, Jill Craybas and Daniela Hantuchová all won in a scoreline of 6–3, 6–3.

- Seeds out:
  - Men's Singles: (Czech Republic) Tomáš Berdych [6], (France) Michaël Llodra [22], (Canada) Milos Raonic [26]
  - Women's Singles: (Russia) Nadia Petrova [26], (Czech Republic) Klára Zakopalová [31]
- Schedule of Play

Matches on main courts
Matches on Court Philippe Chatrier (Center Court)
Event	Winner	Loser	Score
Women's Singles 1st round	(Italy) Francesca Schiavone [5]	(United States) Melanie Oudin	6–2, 6–0
Men's Singles 1st round	(Serbia) Novak Djokovic [2]	(Netherlands) Thiemo de Bakker	6–2, 6–1, 6–3
Men's Singles 1st round	(Switzerland) Roger Federer [3]	(Spain) Feliciano López	6–3, 6–4, 7–6^{(7–3)}
Women's Singles 1st round	(France) Marion Bartoli [11]	(Georgia (country)) Anna Tatishvili	1–6, 6–2, 6–1
Matches on Court Suzanne Lenglen (Grandstand)
Event	Winner	Loser	Score
Women's Singles 1st round	(Romania) Irina-Camelia Begu	(France) Aravane Rezaï	6–3, 6–3
Women's Singles 1st round	(Russia) Vera Zvonareva [3]	(Spain) Lourdes Domínguez Lino	6–3, 6–3
Men's Singles 1st round	(France) Gaël Monfils [9]	(Germany) Björn Phau [Q]	4–6, 6–3, 7–5, 6–0
Men's Singles 1st round	(France) Richard Gasquet [13]	(Czech Republic) Radek Štěpánek	7–5, 6–3, 6–0

== Day 3 (24 May) ==
In a four-hour battle top seed Rafael Nadal finally downed John Isner 6–4, 6–7, 6–7, 6–2, 6–4. This great first-round match saw the young American push the world no.1 to five sets, coming within a whisker of a memorable upset. Andy Murray moved into the second round with a relatively easy win over French qualifier Éric Prodon 6–4, 6–1, 6–3 in the Tuesday afternoon session. No.5 seed Robin Söderling, a finalist here for the last two years, was tested by relatively unknown American Ryan Harrison, ranked no.119 in the world. Soderling's experience pulled him through in the third and fourth sets. Elsewhere, Austrian 8th seed Jürgen Melzer eased past Andreas Beck 6–3, 6–4, 6–2, while no.16 seed Fernando Verdasco came through his match against Argentine Juan Mónaco 6–2, 7–5, 4–6, 6–4. Other seeds that progressed to the second round stage included no.18 Gilles Simon, no.24 Sam Querrey, no.21 Alexandr Dolgopolov, and Florian Mayer, the 20th seed. Wildcard Frenchman Arnaud Clément enjoyed a 6–3, 1–6, 7–6, 6–4 win over Filippo Volandri.

Showing great form on the red clay, Maria Sharapova beat Mirjana Lučić 6–3, 6–0 in the first round. No. 2 Kim Clijsters didn't play her best but had a 6–2, 6–3 win over Anastasiya Yakimova. A number of other seeds came through the draw today; Victoria Azarenka, Li Na, Yanina Wickmayer, Jarmila Gajdošová and Alexandra Dulgheru. As for upsets, Vania King beat 2009 semifinalist Dominika Cibulková 6–7, 6–3, 6–2, and Swede Johanna Larsson took out 2008 champion Ana Ivanovic 7–6, 0–6, 6–2.

- Seeds out:
  - Men's Singles: (Spain) Nicolás Almagro [11]
  - Women's Singles: (Serbia) Ana Ivanovic [20], (Slovakia) Dominika Cibulková [22]
  - Women's Doubles: (Chinese Taipei) Chuang Chia-jung / (Belarus) Olga Govortsova [14], (Slovakia) Daniela Hantuchová / (Poland) Agnieszka Radwańska [12]
- Schedule of Play

Matches on main courts
Matches on Court Philippe Chatrier (Center Court)
Event	Winner	Loser	Score
Women's Singles 1st round	(Australia) Jarmila Gajdošová [24]	(France) Virginie Razzano	6–3, 6–1
Women's Singles 1st round	(Russia) Maria Sharapova [7]	(Croatia) Mirjana Lučić	6–3, 6–0
Men's Singles 1st round	(Spain) Rafael Nadal [1]	(United States) John Isner	6–4, 6–7^{(2–7)}, 6–7^{(2–7)}, 6–2, 6–4
Men's Singles 1st round	(France) Gilles Simon [18]	(United States) Michael Russell	6–3, 4–6, 6–1, 6–0
Matches on Court Suzanne Lenglen (Grandstand)
Event	Winner	Loser	Score
Men's Singles 1st round	(United Kingdom) Andy Murray [4]	(France) Éric Prodon	6–4, 6–1, 6–3
Women's Singles 1st round	(Sweden) Johanna Larsson	(Serbia) Ana Ivanovic [20]	7–6^{(7–3)}, 0–6, 6–2
Men's Singles 1st round	(Sweden) Robin Söderling [5]	(United States) Ryan Harrison	6–1, 6–7^{(5–7)}, 6–3, 7–5
Women's Singles 1st round	(Belgium) Kim Clijsters [2]	(Belarus) Anastasiya Yakimova	6–2, 6–3

== Day 4 (25 May) ==
Novak Djokovic moved on easily to the third round when Victor Hănescu pulled out with a leg problem while trailing 6–4, 6–1, 2–3. Djokovic's next opponent should be much tougher when he faces 2009 US Open champion Juan Martín del Potro, who walloped Blaž Kavčič 6–3, 6–2, 6–4. Roger Federer, the 2009 champion, had no trouble at all racing past France's Maxime Teixeira 6–3, 6–0, 6–2, and he next faces no.29 Janko Tipsarević. Tipsarević took Federer to five sets at the 2009 Aussie Open. French players did well today as no.9 Gaël Monfils beat Guillaume Rufin 6–3, 1–6, 6–1, 6–3, no.13 Richard Gasquet bested Marcel Granollers 4–6, 6–3, 6–2, 6–4 and no.17 Jo-Wilfried Tsonga survived Igor Andreev 6–3, 7–6, 6–3. However France's Julien Benneteau was blitzed by No. 7 David Ferrer 6–3, 6–4, 6–2.

Caroline Wozniacki squeaked by Aleksandra Wozniak 6–3, 7–6 and sealed a place in the third round. There she will meet no.28 seed Daniela Hantuchová. Samantha Stosur showed she is a serious threat for the French Open title, producing incredible tennis in crushing Romania's Simona Halep 6–0, 6–2. Defending champion Francesca Schiavone had an easy time reaching the third round with a 6–1, 6–2 win over Russian Vesna Dolonts, but no.3 seed Vera Zvonareva had a very tough fight with German qualifier Sabine Lisicki as the evening sun lowered over Roland Garros. Sabine called a medical time-out at 4–5 in the final set and eventually fell to Zvonareva 4–6, 7–5, 7–5, ending the match in considerable pain. In other results Jelena Janković disposed of the Russian Vera Dushevina 6–3, 6–2 while 2009 Roland Garros champion Svetlana Kuznetsova had smooth sailing against Irina-Camelia Begu 6–1, 6–1. French hopes Marion Bartoli and Alizé Cornet were also in action against qualifiers. While Cornet received a 6–0, 6–2 thrashing at the hands of Spaniard Nuria Llagostera Vives, compatriot Bartoli fought and finally secured a win over Olga Govortsova 6–4, 6–7, 6–2, a victory that took nearly three hours to complete.

- Seeds out:
  - Women's Singles: (Bulgaria) Tsvetana Pironkova [32]
  - Men's Doubles: (Poland) Mariusz Fyrstenberg / (Poland) Marcin Matkowski [6], (Poland) Łukasz Kubot / (Austria) Oliver Marach [7], (The Bahamas) Mark Knowles / (Slovakia) Michal Mertiňák [12], (United States) John Isner / (United States) Sam Querrey [15]
  - Women's Doubles: (Czech Republic) Iveta Benešová / (Czech Republic) Barbora Záhlavová-Strýcová [8]
  - Mixed Doubles: (United States) Vania King / (Canada) Daniel Nestor [2], (United States) Lisa Raymond / (Austria) Oliver Marach [8]
- Schedule of Play

Matches on main courts
Matches on Court Philippe Chatrier (Center Court)
Event	Winner	Loser	Score
Women's Singles 2nd round	(Denmark) Caroline Wozniacki [1]	(Canada) Aleksandra Wozniak [Q]	6–3, 7–6^{(8–6)}
Men's Singles 2nd round	(France) Gaël Monfils [9]	(France) Guillaume Rufin [WC]	6–3, 1–6, 6–1, 6–3
Men's Singles 2nd round	(Serbia) Novak Djokovic [2]	(Romania) Victor Hănescu	6–4, 6–1, 2–3, ret.
Women's Singles 2nd round	(Italy) Francesca Schiavone [5]	(Russia) Vesna Dolonts	6–1, 6–2
Matches on Court Suzanne Lenglen (Grandstand)
Event	Winner	Loser	Score
Men's Singles 2nd round	(Switzerland) Roger Federer [3]	(France) Maxime Teixeira [WC]	6–3, 6–0, 6–2
Women's Singles 2nd round	(Spain) Nuria Llagostera Vives [Q]	(France) Alizé Cornet	6–0, 6–2
Women's Singles 2nd round	(France) Marion Bartoli [11]	(Belarus) Olga Govortsova [Q]	6–4, 6–7^{(1–7)}, 6–2
Men's Singles 2nd round	(France) Jo-Wilfried Tsonga [17]	(Russia) Igor Andreev	6–3, 7–6^{(7–4)}, 6–3

== Day 5 (26 May) ==
On day five of Roland Garros gusty conditions continued late into the evening and a seeds had a rough going. No.8 Jürgen Melzer, a semi-finalist last year, became the biggest casualty of the day when he fell to Lukáš Rosol, ranked 111 in the world. The Austrian smashed a racquet in fury in the fifth set as Rosol edged home 6–7, 6–4, 4–6, 7–6, 6–4. Argentine Leonardo Mayer shocked no.27 seed Marcos Baghdatis 7–5, 6–4, 7–6, while Alejandro Falla, another qualifier from Colombia, ended the hopes of no.20 seed Florian Mayer 4–6, 7–6, 6–1, 6–2. Elsewhere, Russian Nikolay Davydenko, no. 28 seed, fell at the hands of Antonio Veić. The overjoyed Croat fell flat on his back in disbelief at the 3–6, 6–2, 7–5, 3–6, 6–1 win. Ivan Ljubičić, meanwhile, dispatched another seed, no.24 Sam Querrey 7–6, 6–4, 6–4. No.5 seed Robin Söderling avoided such calamities, easing past Spaniard Albert Ramos 6–3, 6–4, 6–4, while No. 10 seed Mardy Fish beat Robin Haase 7–6, 6–2, 6–1 to reach the third round at Roland Garros for the first time in his career. Fernando Verdasco, no.16, faced a tough second round in the form of Xavier Malisse, Verdasco stood his ground to claim the match 4–6, 6–3, 7–6, 6–4. Arnaud Clément was battling it out with Michael Berrer of Germany. Veteran Clement eventually bowed out in four sets, and Gilles Simon defeated compatriot Jérémy Chardy 4–6, 6–4, 6–4, 3–2. Spaniard Pablo Andújar played well before succumbing 7–5, 6–3, 7–6 to Rafael Nadal. Andy Murray was certainly shaky in advancing into the third round with a 7–6, 6–4, 7–5 victory over Italy's Simone Bolelli.

Kim Clijsters, rusty after recovering from a severe ankle injury, was hoping to play herself into the event. But on a cold, windy morning on Philippe Chatrier Court her play was erratic and she was stunned by Dutch 20-year-old Arantxa Rus 3–6, 7–5, 6–1, in the second round. Clijsters lost 11 of the last 12 games despite holding 2 match points. Elswehere, seeds Petra Kvitová, Agnieszka Radwańska, Victoria Azarenka, Kaia Kanepi, Roberta Vinci, Andrea Petkovic, Li Na, Maria Kirilenko and Yanina Wickmayer all won, while Sorana Cîrstea upset no.27 Alexandra Dulgheru 6–2, 7–5 and American Vania King knocked Britain's Elena Baltacha out 4–6, 6–1, 6–4. The Maria Sharapova vs Caroline Garcia match was a good one. 17-year-old Garcia led 6–3, 4–1 and seemed to be coasting to a huge upset when reality set in. Garcia eventually fell to Maria Sharapova 3–6, 6–4, 6–0 losing the last 11 games.

- Seeds out:
  - Men's Singles: (Austria) Jürgen Melzer [8], (Germany) Florian Mayer [20], (United States) Sam Querrey [24], (Cyprus) Marcos Baghdatis [27], (Russia) Nikolay Davydenko [28], (South Africa) Kevin Anderson [32]
  - Women's Singles: (Belgium) Kim Clijsters [2], (Romania) Alexandra Dulgheru [27]
  - Men's Doubles: (South Africa) Wesley Moodie / (Belgium) Dick Norman [8], (United States) Eric Butorac / (Curaçao) Jean-Julien Rojer [10]
  - Women's Doubles: (China) Peng Shuai / (China) Zheng Jie [10]
- Schedule of Play

Matches on main courts
Matches on Court Philippe Chatrier (Center Court)
Event	Winner	Loser	Score
Women's Singles 2nd round	(Netherlands) Arantxa Rus	(Belgium) Kim Clijsters [2]	3–6, 7–5, 6–1
Men's Singles 2nd round	(United Kingdom) Andy Murray [4]	(Italy) Simone Bolelli [LL]	7–6^{(7–3)}, 6–4, 7–5
Women's Singles 2nd round	(Russia) Maria Sharapova [7]	(France) Caroline Garcia [WC]	3–6, 6–4, 6–0
Men's Singles 2nd round	(France) Gilles Simon [18]	(France) Jérémy Chardy	4–6, 6–4, 6–1, 6–4
Matches on Court Suzanne Lenglen (Grandstand)
Event	Winner	Loser	Score
Men's Singles 2nd round	(Sweden) Robin Söderling [5]	(Spain) Albert Ramos [Q]	6–3, 6–4, 6–4
Women's Singles 2nd round	(China) Li Na [6]	(Spain) Silvia Soler Espinosa [Q]	6–4, 7–5
Men's Singles 2nd round	(Spain) Rafael Nadal [1]	(Spain) Pablo Andújar	7–5, 6–3, 7–6^{(7–4)}
Women's Singles 2nd round	(Belarus) Victoria Azarenka [4]	(France) Pauline Parmentier [WC]	6–0, 6–1

== Day 6 (27 May) ==
It is hard to call a man who is as accomplished on clay courts as David Ferrer a dark horse at Roland Garros, but the Spaniard has yet to reach the semi-finals. At the age of 29, he still has to show he has the legs to go far, but his 6–1, 6–1, 6–3 victory over Ukraine's Sergiy Stakhovsky made it clear that he is capable of doing so. A nearly perfect day for French players turned a little cloudy when Stanislas Wawrinka came back from two sets down to defeat Jo-Wilfried Tsonga 4–6, 6–7, 7–6, 6–2, 6–3. Before that, Gaël Monfils had crushed Steve Darcis 6–3, 6–4, 7–5 and Richard Gasquet dispatched Thomaz Bellucci 6–2, 6–3, 3–6, 6–3. Wawrinka will face his countryman Roger Federer, who cruised past Janko Tipsarević 6–1, 6–4, 6–3. In the other matches of the day, Albert Montañés upset no. 12 seed Mikhail Youzhny and will play Fabio Fognini, who overcame Guillermo García-López in four sets. In fading light on Suzanne Lenglen Court, Novak Djokovic and Juan Martín del Potro played. When chair umpire Pascal Maria called time on proceedings there was nothing to separate the two, the 6–3, 3–6 score-line setting things up for a three-set shootout on Saturday.

Today, the doubters got their way, as last year's runner-up was bundled out of the tournament in three sets by world no. 51 Gisela Dulko 6–4, 1–6, 6–3. Francesca Schiavone advanced to the fourth round of Roland Garros after her opponent Peng Shuai was forced to retire due to illness. Top seed Caroline Wozniacki sensationally crashed out of the French Open 1–6, 3–6 at the hands of Daniela Hantuchová on Friday afternoon. The world no. 1 was sent packing by her Slovakian opponent who barely put a foot wrong during the entire match, hitting 26 winners to 8 of the Dane. In defeating Wozniacki, the 28-year-old has equalled her best result here. She now faces 2009 French Open winner Svetlana Kuznetsova, who saw off up-and-coming Canadian teenager Rebecca Marino 6–0, 6–4 in 49 minutes earlier in the day. Marion Bartoli, who last week reached her first clay court final in Strasbourg before being forced to retire injured, fought back from a set down to scoop a 3–6, 6–2, 6–4 victory over dark-horse Julia Görges but was made to work for it. Meanwhile, over on Court 7, no. 14 seed Anastasia Pavlyuchenkova also came back from a set down to defeat Spanish qualifier Nuria Llagostera Vives 3–6, 6–3, 6–3 and set up a round of 16 clash with fellow Russian Vera Zvonareva, after the no. 3 seed sealed a 6–2, 6–3 victory over Anastasia Rodionova. Jelena Janković (no. 10), who is defending semi-final point from last year, eased past an erratic Bethanie Mattek-Sands 6–2, 6–2.

- Seeds out:
  - Men's Singles: (Russia) Mikhail Youzhny [12], (France) Jo-Wilfried Tsonga [17], (Brazil) Thomaz Bellucci [23], (Serbia) Janko Tipsarević [29], (Spain) Guillermo García-López [30], (Ukraine) Sergiy Stakhovsky [31]
  - Women's Singles: (Denmark) Caroline Wozniacki [1], (Australia) Samantha Stosur [8], (Germany) Julia Görges [17], (China) Peng Shuai [29]
  - Men's Doubles: (Brazil) Marcelo Melo / (Brazil) Bruno Soares [11]
  - Women's Doubles: (United States) Bethanie Mattek-Sands / (United States) Meghann Shaughnessy [6]
  - Mixed Doubles: (United States) Liezel Huber / (South Africa) Wesley Moodie [6]
- Schedule of Play

Matches on main courts
Matches on Court Philippe Chatrier (Center Court)
Event	Winner	Loser	Score
Women's Singles 3rd round	(Argentina) Gisela Dulko	(Australia) Samantha Stosur [8]	6–4, 1–6, 6–3
Women's Singles 3rd round	(France) Marion Bartoli [11]	(Germany) Julia Görges [17]	3–6, 6–2, 6–4
Men's Singles 3rd round	(Switzerland) Stanislas Wawrinka [14]	(France) Jo-Wilfried Tsonga [17]	4–6, 6–7^{(3–7)}, 7–6^{(7–5)}, 6–2, 6–3
Matches on Court Suzanne Lenglen (Grandstand)
Event	Winner	Loser	Score
Women's Singles 3rd round	(Italy) Francesca Schiavone [5]	(China) Peng Shuai [29]	6–3, 1–2, ret.
Men's Singles 3rd round	(Switzerland) Roger Federer [3]	(Serbia) Janko Tipsarević [29]	6–1, 6–4, 6–3
Women's Singles 3rd round	(Slovakia) Daniela Hantuchová [28]	(Denmark) Caroline Wozniacki [1]	6–1, 6–3
Men's Singles 3rd round	(France) Richard Gasquet [13]	(Brazil) Thomaz Bellucci [23]	6–2, 6–3, 3–6, 6–3
Men's Singles 3rd round	(Argentina) Juan Martín del Potro [25] vs (Serbia) Novak Djokovic [2]		3–6, 6–3, suspended

== Day 7 (28 May) ==
Novak Djokovic showed all his class to cut down Juan Martín del Potro 6–3, 3–6, 6–3, 6–2 on Suzanne Lenglen court. In a match carried over from the previous night when the score was one set all. The first time the no. 227-ranked qualifier Antonio Veić had ever faced a top ten player. And while Rafael Nadal went on to polish off the match 6–1, 6–3, 6–0 it was clear the 23-year-old qualifier was intent on savouring every moment of this special experience. No.4 seed Andy Murray overcame a sprained ankle suffered mid-match to record a remarkable straight-sets win, 6–2, 6–3, 6–2 over world no.95 Michael Berrer, who had no answer to the immobilised Scotsman's "win or bust" strategy. On paper, Gilles Simon faced a tall order in the form of American Mardy Fish, who is now the leading player in the United States. But defeated the American 6–3, 6–4, 6–2. Like Simon, no.5 seed Robin Söderling also secured a 6–1, 6–4, 6–3 victory over qualifier Leonardo Mayer to set up a clash with Gilles Simon. The complete opposite was true for Spaniard Fernando Verdasco, whose scalp was claimed by the oldest man still in the draw, Ivan Ljubičić losing 6–3, 7–6, 6–4. Elsewhere, qualifiers Alejandro Falla and Łukasz Kubot were also fighting for a fourth round place. Falla, defeated the Pole 7–6, 6–4, 7–5, 6–4 and will meet Argentina's Juan Ignacio Chela, who dispatched another qualifier Lukáš Rosol 6–2, 6–4, 3–6, 7–6 earlier in the day. Meanwhile, Viktor Troicki justified his no.15 seeding by beating Alexandr Dolgopolov 6–4, 3–6, 6–3, 6–4. The win means Troicki will meet Brit fourth seed Andy Murray in the round of 16.

Chinese veteran and no.6 seed Li Na started the day by routing Sorana Cîrstea 6–2, 6–2, which was followed by Victoria Azarenka thrashing Roberta Vinci 6–3, 6–2. Petra Kvitová punched her way past Vania King 6–4, 6–2. Maria Sharapova is bidding to complete her career Slam with success here at the French, and after surviving a scare against French teenager Caroline Garcia in the second round she made no mistake against Chan Yung-jan. The Russian emerged a comfortable winner 6–2, 6–3. Maria Kirilenko meanwhile has not enjoyed the same storied career as her fellow Russian of the 1987 vintage, she utterly outclassed Clijster's conqueror Arantxa Rus. Sharapova will face Agnieszka Radwańska, who defeated Yanina Wickmayer 6–4, 6–4, while Kirilenko will take on Andrea Petkovic. The German no.15 seed found herself locked in a battle royal with neo-Australian Jarmila Gajdošová, but emerged victorious 6–2, 4–6, 6–3, her Petkodance moonwalk more relieved than elated after she survived some scary moments in the decider which saw five breaks of service.

- Seeds out:
  - Men's Singles: (United States) Mardy Fish [10], (Spain) Fernando Verdasco [16], (Ukraine) Alexandr Dolgopolov [21], (Argentina) Juan Martín del Potro [25]
  - Women's Singles: (Estonia) Kaia Kanepi [16], (Belgium) Yanina Wickmayer [21], (Australia) Jarmila Gajdošová [24], (Italy) Roberta Vinci [30]
  - Men's Doubles: (India) Mahesh Bhupathi / (India) Leander Paes [3], (Spain) Marc López / (Spain) David Marrero [13], (Ukraine) Sergiy Stakhovsky / (Russia) Mikhail Youzhny [16]
  - Women's Doubles: (Italy) Sara Errani / (Italy) Roberta Vinci [15], (South Africa) Natalie Grandin / (Czech Republic) Vladimíra Uhlířová [16]
  - Mixed Doubles: (Russia) Elena Vesnina / (Belarus) Max Mirnyi [4]
- Schedule of Play

Matches on main courts
Matches on Court Philippe Chatrier (Center Court)
Event	Winner	Loser	Score
Women's Singles 3rd round	(Belarus) Victoria Azarenka [4]	(Italy) Roberta Vinci [30]	6–3, 6–2
Men's Singles 3rd round	(Spain) Rafael Nadal [1]	(Croatia) Antonio Veić [Q]	6–1, 6–3, 6–0
Men's Singles 3rd round	(France) Gilles Simon [18]	(United States) Mardy Fish [10]	6–3, 6–4, 6–2
Women's Singles 3rd round	(Russia) Maria Sharapova [7]	(Chinese Taipei) Chan Yung-jan [Q]	6–2, 6–3
Mixed Doubles 1st round	(Australia) Jarmila Gajdošová (Brazil) Thomaz Bellucci	(France) Alizé Cornet [WC] (France) Gilles Simon [WC]	7–5, 5–7, [10–1]
Matches on Court Suzanne Lenglen (Grandstand)
Event	Winner	Loser	Score
Women's Singles 3rd round	(China) Li Na [6]	(Romania) Sorana Cîrstea	6–2, 6–2
Men's Singles 3rd round	(United Kingdom) Andy Murray [4]	(Germany) Michael Berrer	6–2, 6–3, 6–2
Men's Singles 3rd round	(Serbia) Novak Djokovic [2]	(Argentina) Juan Martín del Potro [25]	6–3, 3–6, 6–3, 6–2
Women's Singles 3rd round	(Poland) Agnieszka Radwańska [12]	(Belgium) Yanina Wickmayer [21]	6–4, 6–4
Men's Singles 3rd round	(Sweden) Robin Söderling [5]	(Argentina) Leonardo Mayer [Q]	6–1, 6–4, 6–3

== Day 8 (29 May) ==
It took Roger Federer a mere one hour and 45 minutes to defeat his compatriot Stanislas Wawrinka 6–3, 6–2, 7–5 on Sunday, securing his 28th consecutive Grand Slam quarter-final berth in the process and breaking the record set by Jimmy Connors. Fabio Fognini became the first Italian man to reach the quarter-finals of a Grand Slam in 13 years, defeating Albert Montañés 4–6, 6–4, 3–6, 6–3, 11–9 in a four-and-a-half hour epic. The Lenglen crowd booed Fognini in the 95-minute final set as he took a medical time-out then received further treatment at the change-overs for what the fans perceived as cramp – an ailment for which players are not allowed to call out the medical staff. In the end, the 49-ranked player in the world completed the match with heavy strapping on his left thigh and a hang-dog expression on his face as he pleaded with the crowd for clemency. Novak Djokovic had his man now after winning the first set 6–4, and with the pressure off and the crowd becalmed, he moved up another gear. Now we could delight in some of the cleanest hitting you are ever likely to see, and Richard Gasquet could only stand and watch as the ball fizzed by. The second set was won 6–4 in 37 minutes and the third, a formality, snapped up 6–2 in 34 minutes to complete an excellent afternoon's work. When Gaël Monfils and David Ferrer won through to face each other in the fourth round, it was clear that they would engage in long foot race. The match lived up to its billing, but was unable to conclude as the contest was suspended after three hours with Monfils leading 6–4, 2–6, 7–5, 0–2.

The 19-year-old Russian Anastasia Pavlyuchenkova dispatched No.3 seed Vera Zvonareva 7–6, 2–6, 6–2 in a match whose fluctuations were dictated as much by the vacillations of the 2003 quarterfinalist's mental state as they were by the ebb and flow of the Pavlyuchenkova thumping baseline game. Defending champion Francesca Schiavone kissed the clay once more after navigating her way through an error-strewn match to overcome Jelena Janković 6–3, 2–6, 6–4 in two hours and 38 minutes. Gisela Dulko was in incredible form, having dispatched last year's runner up and no.8 seed Sam Stosur in the previous round. But as Marion Bartoli raced to 5–2 lead it became apparent that all was not well with the Argentinean. Dulko was clutching her hip, the doctor was then called and the 26-year-old lay sprawled on the clay where she received treatment to her upper thigh. Dulko then came back but still lost the set 7–5. Trailing 1–0 in the second set, Dulko decided that discretion was the better part of valour and retired, allowing Bartoli through to her first Grand Slam quarter-final since the 2009 Australian Open. Meanwhile, over on no.1 court, a three-set tussle was taking place between Daniela Hantuchová and 2009 French Open champion Russian Svetlana Kuznetsova. Kuznetsova, who had enjoyed a relatively easy run on her road to this match dropping only 11 games along the way, still had plenty left in the tank however. She got stronger as the match went on while her 28-year-old opponent appeared to wilt, and Kuznetsova duly fought back to take the match 6–7, 6–3, 6–2 to set up a quarter-final clash with Bartoli.

- Seeds out:
  - Men's Singles: (France) Richard Gasquet [13], (Switzerland) Stanislas Wawrinka [14]
  - Women's Singles: (Russia) Vera Zvonareva [3], (Serbia) Jelena Janković [10], (Slovakia) Daniela Hantuchová [28]
  - Men's Doubles: (Czech Republic) František Čermák / (Slovakia) Filip Polášek [14]
  - Women's Doubles: (Spain) María José Martínez Sánchez / (Spain) Anabel Medina Garrigues [11], (Chinese Taipei) Chan Yung-jan / (Romania) Monica Niculescu [13]
  - Mixed Doubles: (Czech Republic) Květa Peschke / (Pakistan) Aisam-ul-Haq Qureshi [3], (China) Zheng Jie / (India) Mahesh Bhupathi [5]
- Schedule of Play

Matches on main courts
Matches on Court Philippe Chatrier (Center Court)
Event	Winner	Loser	Score
Women's Singles 4th round	(Russia) Anastasia Pavlyuchenkova [14]	(Russia) Vera Zvonareva [3]	7–6^{(7–4)}, 2–6, 6–2
Men's Singles 4th round	(Switzerland) Roger Federer [3]	(Switzerland) Stanislas Wawrinka [14]	6–3, 6–2, 7–5
Men's Singles 4th round	(Serbia) Novak Djokovic [2]	(France) Richard Gasquet [13]	6–4, 6–4, 6–2
Women's Singles 4th round	(France) Marion Bartoli [11]	(Argentina) Gisela Dulko	7–5, 1–0, ret.
Matches on Court Suzanne Lenglen (Grandstand)
Event	Winner	Loser	Score
Men's Singles 4th round	(Italy) Fabio Fognini	(Spain) Albert Montañés	4–6, 6–4, 3–6, 6–3, 11–9
Women's Singles 4th round	(Italy) Francesca Schiavone [5]	(Serbia) Jelena Janković [10]	6–3, 2–6, 6–4
Men's Singles 4th round	(Spain) David Ferrer [7] vs. (France) Gaël Monfils [9]		4–6, 6–2, 5–7, 2–0, suspended

== Day 9 (30 May) ==
Juan Ignacio Chela did reach the Roland Garros quarterfinals back in 2004 with a mid career flurry, but at the age of the 31, and despite his consistent play over the years, he was not expected to make a second week charge in 2011. But even the most hardened veterans can surprise themselves and the tall Argentine did so when he hung tough, slapped groundstrokes and eventually wore down Colombian Alejandro Falla 4–6, 6–2, 1–6, 7–6, 6–2 for a place in the final eight. Gaël Monfils has a flair for the dramatic, and the last French contender in the men's singles certainly provided plenty of excitement in a charged-up 6–4, 2–6, 7–5, 1–6, 8–6 win over Spanish seventh seed David Ferrer on Monday. Monfils needed four match points to close the match out, but even though the Spaniard is known as one of the toughest men on tour, the 24-year-old out-gutted him when it mattered most. Ferrer, who was attempting to reach his first Roland Garros semi-final, said that failing to convert the break point at 6–6 in the decider was crucial in the outcome of the match. Most people love Paris in the spring and Robin Söderling is certainly no exception. The Swede made light work of Gilles Simon on Monday, winning 6–2, 6–3, 7–6 to set up a third Roland Garros battle with Rafael Nadal in as many years. No.1 seed Rafael Nadal opened the second week of his title defence with a routine 7–5, 6–3, 6–3 win over Ivan Ljubičić. The veteran Croat battled gamely throughout and saved no fewer than 14 break points, coming to the net bravely to try to catch his opponent off-guard, but it takes more than that to rattle the five-time champion on clay over five sets. With the light failing on Suzanne Lenglen court, Andy Murray fought back from two sets down against Serbian no.15 seed Victor Troicki to take the match into a final set. The score is tied at two sets all, 4–6, 4–6, 6–3, 6–2, so Murray and Troicki will be back for a one-set shootout on Tuesday to see who progresses to a quarter-final against Juan Ignacio Chela.

In the absence of the top three women's seeds in the second week – for the first time in the Open Era – Australian Open 2011 finalist Li Na and 2010 Wimbledon semi-finalist Petra Kvitová found themselves two of the more experienced Grand Slam contenders for the French Open title. Perhaps that extra round's worth of experience made the difference for Li on Monday, the Chinese no.6 seed overcoming a steamroller start by her no.9-seeded opponent to advance to the quarter-finals at Roland Garros 2–6, 6–1, 6–3. Victoria Azarenka forged ahead with her French Open campaign by defeating Ekaterina Makarova 6–2, 6–3 in the kind of simple, straight-sets victory that she has made her calling-card at the tournament over the past week. Maria Sharapova overcame a rusty to start to see off Agnieszka Radwańska 7–6, 7–5 in a topsy-turvy match that saw her advance to the French Open quarter-finals for the fifth time in her career. Sharapova will face Andrea Petkovic in the quarter-final after the charismatic German came out on top of a three-set contest against Maria Kirilenko. Petkovic then broke in the ninth game and then with bravery, ferocity and above all focus served out for a 6–2, 2–6, 6–4 win which sees her into her second consecutive Grand Slam quarter-final.

- Seeds out:
  - Men's Singles: (Spain) David Ferrer [7], (France) Gilles Simon [18]
  - Women's Singles: (Czech Republic) Petra Kvitová [9], (Poland) Agnieszka Radwańska [12], (Russia) Maria Kirilenko [25]
  - Women's Doubles: (Argentina) Gisela Dulko / (Italy) Flavia Pennetta [1], (Czech Republic) Květa Peschke / (Slovenia) Katarina Srebotnik [2]
  - Mixed Doubles: (Czech Republic) Iveta Benešová / (India) Leander Paes [7]
- Schedule of Play

Matches on main courts
Matches on Court Philippe Chatrier (Center Court)
Event	Winner	Loser	Score
Women's Singles 4th round	(China) Li Na [6]	(Czech Republic) Petra Kvitová [9]	2–6, 6–1, 6–3
Men's Singles 4th round	(Spain) Rafael Nadal [1]	(Croatia) Ivan Ljubičić	7–5, 6–3, 6–3
Men's Singles 4th round	(Sweden) Robin Söderling [5]	(France) Gilles Simon [18]	6–2, 6–3, 7–6^{(7–5)}
Women's Singles 4th round	(Russia) Maria Sharapova [7]	(Poland) Agnieszka Radwańska [12]	7–6^{(7–4)}, 7–5
Matches on Court Suzanne Lenglen (Grandstand)
Event	Winner	Loser	Score
Men's Singles 4th round	(Argentina) Juan Ignacio Chela	(Colombia) Alejandro Falla [Q]	4–6, 6–2, 1–6, 7–6^{(7–5)}, 6–2
Men's Singles 4th round	(France) Gaël Monfils [9]	(Spain) David Ferrer [7]	6–4, 2–6, 7–5, 1–6, 8–6
Women's Singles 4th round	(Belarus) Victoria Azarenka [4]	(Russia) Ekaterina Makarova	6–2, 6–3
Men's Singles 4th round	(United Kingdom) Andy Murray [4] vs. (Serbia) Viktor Troicki [15]		4–6, 4–6, 6–3, 6–2, suspended

== Day 10 (31 May) ==
Novak Djokovic was scheduled to play however Djokovic's quarterfinal opponent, Fabio Fognini, withdrew from the tournament Monday, one day after his wild and controversial 4–6, 6–4, 3–6, 6–3, 11–9 victory over Albert Montañés. Scotland's Andy Murray came back from the brink to overturn no.15 seed Viktor Troicki 4–6, 4–6, 6–3, 6–2, 7–5 on Tuesday. Two sets all overnight, the Serb had Murray where he wanted him, serving for the match at 5–3, 30–0, but was unable to see it out in the face of some brilliant backs-to-the wall hitting from the fourth seed. The match also included an incident when a ball-boy accidentally ran on the court before the point had been won, causing the point to be retaken, despite Troicki winning the rally. For the first time since 2003, Roger Federer did not come into Roland Garros as one of the top two favorites to win the title. But after his clean and impressive 6–4, 6–3, 7–6 victory over France's Gaël Monfils, the Swiss appears ready to give the red hot Djokovic a tussle in the semifinals.

What a difference a year makes. At the quarter-final stage of this tournament 12 months ago nobody gave much thought to crafty Italian Francesca Schiavone as a potential French Open champion. Twelve months on, the no.5 seed demonstrated why she is now many fans' favourite to take the title with a battling 1–6, 7–5, 7–5 victory over Anastasia Pavlyuchenkova, Schiavone served for the matched at 5–2. Marion Bartoli's love affair with the French Open continued this evening when she saw off 2009 French Open champion Svetlana Kuznetsova 7–6, 6–4 in front of an exhilarated home crowd. The 26-year-old no.11 seed needed just one hour and 47 minutes to dispatch the two time Grand Slam winner and become the first French woman in six years to reach the semifinal stage.

- Seeds out:
  - Men's Singles: (France) Gaël Monfils [9], (Serbia) Viktor Troicki [15]
  - Women's Singles: (Russia) Svetlana Kuznetsova [13], (Russia) Anastasia Pavlyuchenkova [14]
  - Men's Doubles: (Sweden) Robert Lindstedt / (Romania) Horia Tecău [9]
  - Women's Doubles: (Belarus) Victoria Azarenka / (Russia) Maria Kirilenko [5], (Russia) Nadia Petrova / (Australia) Anastasia Rodionova [9]
- Schedule of Play

Matches on main courts
Matches on Court Philippe Chatrier (Center Court)
Event	Winner	Loser	Score
Women's Singles Quarterfinal	(Italy) Francesca Schiavone [5]	(Russia) Anastasia Pavlyuchenkova [14]	1–6, 7–5, 7–5
Men's Singles Quarterfinal	(Switzerland) Roger Federer [3]	(France) Gaël Monfils [9]	6–4, 6–3, 7–6^{(7–3)}
Men's Doubles Quarterfinal	(Belarus) Max Mirnyi [2] (Canada) Daniel Nestor [2]	(Sweden) Robert Lindstedt [9] (Romania) Horia Tecău [9]	6–4, 6–2
Matches on Court Suzanne Lenglen (Grandstand)
Event	Winner	Loser	Score
Men's Singles 4th round	(United Kingdom) Andy Murray [4]	(Serbia) Viktor Troicki [15]	4–6, 4–6, 6–3, 6–2, 7–5
Men's Doubles Quarterfinal	(France) Michaël Llodra [4] (Serbia) Nenad Zimonjić [4]	(United States) Scott Lipsky (United States) Rajeev Ram	2–6, 6–3, 6–1
Women's Singles Quarterfinal	(France) Marion Bartoli [11]	(Russia) Svetlana Kuznetsova [13]	7–6^{(7–4)}, 6–4
Men's Doubles Quarterfinal	(United States) Bob Bryan [1] / (United States) Mike Bryan [1] vs. (India) Rohan Bopanna [5] / (Pakistan) Aisam-ul-Haq Qureshi [5]		6–7^{(2–7)}, 6–3, 5–5, suspended

== Day 11 (1 June) ==
Rafael Nadal emphatically silenced the doubters by overpowering no.5 seed Robin Söderling for two sets and then repelling a stirring fightback as the huge-hitting Swede desperately tried to save his 2011 French Open campaign. As is so often the case, the tone was set in the early games. Two breaks in three games set him up nicely, even allowing him the luxury of dropping his own serve en route to the first set, 6–4. As Soderling grew frustrated, Nadal cranked up his forehand and bludgeoned his way to a two-set lead, the second wrapped up 6–1 in only 33 minutes. Nadal will be hugely encouraged by the win, not only in the way he raised his game to old heights in the first two sets, but also in his solidity in the face of some ferocious hitting from Soderling in the third. Andy Murray did not want to spoil the party. For the first time since 2006, the four top seeds will meet in the Roland Garros semi-finals thanks to the Scotsman's impressive 7–6, 7–5, 6–2 victory over Juan Ignacio Chela.

Li Na reached her first ever French Open semi-final with a comfortable 7–5, 6–2 win over Victoria Azarenka on Wednesday. An initially tight match swung in the Chinese sixth seed's favour at the end of the first set, and thereafter she never looked back. Maria Sharapova took a step closer to claiming a career Grand Slam after beating Andrea Petkovic 6–0 6–3 in a one-sided contest on Suzanne Lenglen Court. Sharapova began the match in form so hot, Petkovic didn't so much wilt as completely dissolve under her opponent's intensity. Sharapova was a picture of determination, hitting everything on the front foot to reel off winner after winner.

- Seeds out:
  - Men's Singles: (Sweden) Robin Söderling [5]
  - Women's Singles: (Belarus) Victoria Azarenka [4], (Germany) Andrea Petkovic [15]
  - Women's Doubles: (United States) Vania King / (Kazakhstan) Yaroslava Shvedova [3], (United States) Liezel Huber / (United States) Lisa Raymond [4]
- Schedule of Play

Matches on main courts
Matches on Court Philippe Chatrier (Center Court)
Event	Winner	Loser	Score
Women's Singles Quarterfinals	(China) Li Na [6]	(Belarus) Victoria Azarenka [4]	7–5, 6–2
Men's Singles Quarterfinals	(Spain) Rafael Nadal [1]	(Sweden) Robin Söderling [5]	6–4, 6–1, 7–6^{(7–3)}
Women's Doubles Semifinals	(Czech Republic) Andrea Hlaváčková (Czech Republic) Lucie Hradecká	(United States) Vania King [3] (Kazakhstan) Yaroslava Shvedova [3]	6–3, 6–3
Matches on Court Suzanne Lenglen (Grandstand)
Event	Winner	Loser	Score
Women's Singles Quarterfinals	(Russia) Maria Sharapova [7]	(Germany) Andrea Petkovic [15]	6–0, 6–3
Men's Singles Quarterfinals	(United Kingdom) Andy Murray [4]	(Argentina) Juan Ignacio Chela	7–6^{(7–2)}, 7–5, 6–2
Women's Doubles Semifinals	(India) Sania Mirza [7] (Russia) Elena Vesnina [7]	(United States) Liezel Huber [4] (United States) Lisa Raymond [4]	6–3, 2–6, 6–4

== Day 12 (2 June) ==
Of all the wannabe Grand Slam champions circling this year's French Open women's singles title, few have flown as far below the radar as Li Na. The Chinese woman's personal brand of conservative, carefully calculated tennis again paid dividends at Roland Garros on Thursday however, helping her overcome testing conditions to demolish Maria Sharapova's campaign for a career Grand Slam 6–4, 7–5, and advance to the second major final of her career. Sharapova striking yet another double fault at match point and her 10th to send her 29-year-old opponent into the French Open final, 6–4, 7–5. Francesca Schiavone treated the fans to a magnificent display of clay-court tennis on Thursday, brushing aside Marion Bartoli 6–3, 6–3 to secure a second straight appearance in the French Open final. Victorious in 90 minutes of play, the Italian will be hoping for a repeat of last year's triumph when she faces Li Na of China in Saturday's showpiece. Schiavone was just too strong for the French no.11 seed, who fought bravely but did not have the variety of shots to trouble the Italian. Schiavone played to her potential and then some, applying her more classical technique to great effect against the unorthodox Frenchwoman.

The unseeded pairing of Casey Dellacqua and Scott Lipsky defeated the reigning champions Katarina Srebotnik and Nenad Zimonjić to take the 2011 French Open mixed doubles crown, securing the title after a super tie-break, 7–6, 4–6, [10–7].

- Seeds out:
  - Women's Singles: (Russia) Maria Sharapova [7], (France) Marion Bartoli [11]
  - Men's Doubles: (United States) Bob Bryan / (United States) Mike Bryan [1], (France) Michaël Llodra / (Serbia) Nenad Zimonjić [4]
  - Mixed Doubles: (Slovenia) Katarina Srebotnik / (Serbia) Nenad Zimonjić [1]
- Schedule of Play

Matches on main courts
Matches on Court Philippe Chatrier (Center Court)
Event	Winner	Loser	Score
Women's Singles Semifinals	(China) Li Na [6]	(Russia) Maria Sharapova [7]	6–4, 7–5
Women's Singles Semifinals	(Italy) Francesca Schiavone [5]	(France) Marion Bartoli [11]	6–3, 6–3
Mixed Doubles Final	(Australia) Casey Dellacqua (United States) Scott Lipsky	(Slovenia) Katarina Srebotnik [1] (Serbia) Nenad Zimonjić [1]	7–6^{(8–6)}, 4–6, [10–7]
Matches on Court Suzanne Lenglen (Grandstand)
Event	Winner	Loser	Score
Women's Legends Doubles Group A	(United States) Martina Navratilova (Czech Republic) Jana Novotná	(Croatia) Iva Majoli (Spain) Conchita Martínez	7–5, 6–1
Men's Doubles Semifinals	(Belarus) Max Mirnyi [2] (Canada) Daniel Nestor [2]	(France) Michaël Llodra [4] (Serbia) Nenad Zimonjić [4]	7–6^{(7–4)}, 7–6^{(7–5)}
Legends Under 45 Doubles Group A	(France) Fabrice Santoro (Australia) Todd Woodbridge	(Croatia) Goran Ivanišević (Germany) Michael Stich	7–6^{(7–4)}, 6–3
Men's Doubles Semifinals	(Colombia) Juan Sebastián Cabal (Argentina) Eduardo Schwank	(United States) Bob Bryan [1] (United States) Mike Bryan [1]	7–6^{(7–4)}, 6–3
Legends Over 45 Doubles Group A	(France) Guy Forget (France) Henri Leconte	(Romania) Ilie Năstase (Spain) Emilio Sánchez	6–3, 6–2

== Day 13 (3 June) ==
Rafael Nadal survived a hard-fought three-sets win. In a match in windy conditions, the no.1 seed outlasted Andy Murray 6–4, 7–5, 6–4. The two traded blows for over three hours, with almost every rally worthy of the highlight reels. The difference in the end was that five-time champion Nadal did what great players do – he won the big points. As night fell over Roland Garros on Friday, fans were treated to one of the all-time great French Open semi-finals. It ended with Roger Federer triumphing over Novak Djokovic 7–6, 6–3, 3–6, 7–6 in three hours 39 minutes. The Swiss third seed goes on to meet world no.1 and five-time champion Rafael Nadal in Sunday's final. Roger Federer brought Novak Djokovic's 41-match unbeaten run this season to an end in the most dramatic of circumstances. Revelling in his role as the underdog, the Swiss legend was at his vintage best, seizing the initiative at all the right times, winning most of the big points, and hanging tough when he needed to.

After falling to the eventual champions in 2010, the Czech Republic's Lucie Hradecká and Andrea Hlaváčková won their first Grand Slam title this year by defeating Sania Mirza and Elena Vesnina (no.7) 6–4, 6–3 in the women's doubles final, in one hour and twenty-one minutes.

- Seeds out:
  - Men's Singles: (Serbia) Novak Djokovic [2], (United Kingdom) Andy Murray [4]
  - Women's Doubles: (India) Sania Mirza / (Russia) Elena Vesnina [7]
- Schedule of Play

Matches on main courts
Matches on Court Philippe Chatrier (Center Court)
Event	Winner	Loser	Score
Men's Singles Semifinals	(Spain) Rafael Nadal [1]	(United Kingdom) Andy Murray [4]	6–4, 7–5, 6–4
Men's Singles Semifinals	(Switzerland) Roger Federer [3]	(Serbia) Novak Djokovic [2]	7–6^{(7–5)}, 6–3, 3–6, 7–6^{(7–5)}
Matches on Court Suzanne Lenglen (Grandstand)
Event	Winner	Loser	Score
Legends Over 45 Doubles Group B	(Ecuador) Andrés Gómez (United States) John McEnroe	(Sweden) Mikael Pernfors (Sweden) Mats Wilander	7–6^{(7–5)}, 7–6^{(7–4)}
Legends Under 45 Doubles Group B	(Russia) Yevgeny Kafelnikov (Ukraine) Andriy Medvedev	(France) Arnaud Boetsch (France) Cédric Pioline	6–4, 4–6, [10–8]
Girls' Singles Semifinals	(Tunisia) Ons Jabeur [9]	(France) Caroline Garcia [3]	6–2, 1–6, 6–2
Women's Doubles Final	(Czech Republic) Andrea Hlaváčková (Czech Republic) Lucie Hradecká	(India) Sania Mirza [7] (Russia) Elena Vesnina [7]	6–3, 6–4
Women's Legends Doubles Group A	(Bulgaria) Magdalena Maleeva (France) Nathalie Tauziat	(Croatia) Iva Majoli (Spain) Conchita Martínez	6–4, 6–2

== Day 14 (4 June) ==
China's Li Na held firm in the face of a ferocious comeback on the part of defending champion Francesca Schiavone to win 6–4, 7–6 and claim the first-ever Grand Slam title for a player from Asia. The sixth seed put in a brilliant display, dominating Schiavone in the opening set and then stymieing the Italian's comeback in the second. Li is a fully deserving champion, having beaten four top ten seeds to claim the crown, and her success should do wonders for the popularity of the sport in China. "Someone was saying I'm getting old", Li said after the match – the first clay court title of her career. "So you know the old woman like the dream to come true. Not easy. At 6–0 in the tie-break I was thinking don't do a stupid thing. Before I have many match points on clay but I never win the match. So I was like, okay, you need one point. Of course, it's exciting. Not so many players can win a Grand Slam." Li, who also made the Australian Open final earlier this year, has been largely responsible for putting Chinese tennis on the map, but she is not convinced everyone will remember her when she gets home. "The next two weeks is Wimbledon, so I don't have time to go back to China right now", she said. "I go back after Wimbledon, maybe people forget me already. These are tough times you know." Meanwhile, members of Li's immediate family – including her mother – are unlikely to have witnessed her historic victory. "I didn't contact her...My mum and sister always say oh she's playing now and then they turn off the TV because it made them nervous. I don't think she watched but I will contact her later." Defending champion Francesca Schiavone praised Li's performance. "She played, really deep so I couldn't play my spin and really high so she could come in", said Schiavone. "She played really high level through one set and 2–1, 3–1, she was playing really good. I tried to push more, to risk more and she went down with the level. But it's normal. Tennis is always like this. I think at the end we were really close and (the set) could be for me or for her. But at the end, she won. She deserve this final. She fight a lot and she played good also on the clay."

No.2 seeds Max Mirnyi and Daniel Nestor won their first Grand Slam title together on Saturday, defeating their unseeded opponents Juan Sebastián Cabal and Eduardo Schwank 7–6, 3–6, 6–4. The two players have a storied past on the doubles circuit in their own rights, but only came together as a pairing at the start of the year.

- Seeds out:
  - Women's Singles: (Italy) Francesca Schiavone [5]
- Schedule of Play

Matches on main courts
Matches on Court Philippe Chatrier (Center Court)
Event	Winner	Loser	Score
Women's Singles Final	(China) Li Na [6]	(Italy) Francesca Schiavone [5]	6–4, 7–6^{(7–0)}
Men's Doubles Final	(Belarus) Max Mirnyi [2] (Canada) Daniel Nestor [2]	(Colombia) Juan Sebastián Cabal (Argentina) Eduardo Schwank	7–6^{(7–3)}, 3–6, 6–4
Matches on Court Suzanne Lenglen (Grandstand)
Event	Winner	Loser	Score
Legends Over 45 Doubles Group B	(Ecuador) Andrés Gómez (United States) John McEnroe	(Australia) Pat Cash (Australia) Peter McNamara	6–1, 2–6, [10–8]
Women's Legends Doubles Group B	(United States) Lindsay Davenport (Switzerland) Martina Hingis	(Hungary) Andrea Temesvári (France) Sandrine Testud	6–3, 6–7^{(4–7)}, [10–0]
Legends Under 45 Doubles Group A	(France) Fabrice Santoro (Australia) Todd Woodbridge	(Spain) Sergi Bruguera (Netherlands) Richard Krajicek	7–6^{(7–2)}, 6–3
Legends Over 45 Doubles Group A	(Romania) Ilie Năstase (Spain) Emilio Sánchez	(Iran) Mansour Bahrami (Australia) Mark Woodforde	6–3, 7–5

== Day 15 (5 June) ==
In the final, Rafael Nadal defeated Roger Federer to claim his sixth French Open title. Nadal matched Björn Borg's record of six Roland Garros titles with his win and also became the first World No. 1 player to win the tournament since Gustavo Kuerten in 2001.

Ons Jabeur became the first girl from North Africa to win a junior Grand Slam title, defeating no.5 seed Monica Puig in the girls' singles final. The Tunisian struggled to overcome her Puerto Rican opponent in the first set before cruising away in the second. Bjorn Fratangelo won the boys' singles final over Austria's Dominic Thiem, in a battle that lasted two hours and seven minutes. Fratangelo is the first American to win the boys' singles here at Roland Garros since John McEnroe back in 1977.

- Seeds out:
  - Men's Singles: (Switzerland) Roger Federer [3]
- Schedule of Play

Matches on main courts
Matches on Court Philippe Chatrier (Center Court)
Event	Winner	Loser	Score
Men's Singles Final	(Spain) Rafael Nadal [1]	(Switzerland) Roger Federer [3]	7–5, 7–6^{(7–3)}, 5–7, 6–1
Matches on Court Suzanne Lenglen (Grandstand)
Event	Winner	Loser	Score
Legends Over 45 Doubles Final	(France) Guy Forget (France) Henri Leconte	(Ecuador) Andrés Gómez (United States) John McEnroe	6–3, 5–7, [10–8]
Women's Legends Doubles Final	(United States) Lindsay Davenport (Switzerland) Martina Hingis	(United States) Martina Navratilova (Czech Republic) Jana Novotná	6–1, 6–2
