= Maxim Dubarenco =

Moldovan tennis player

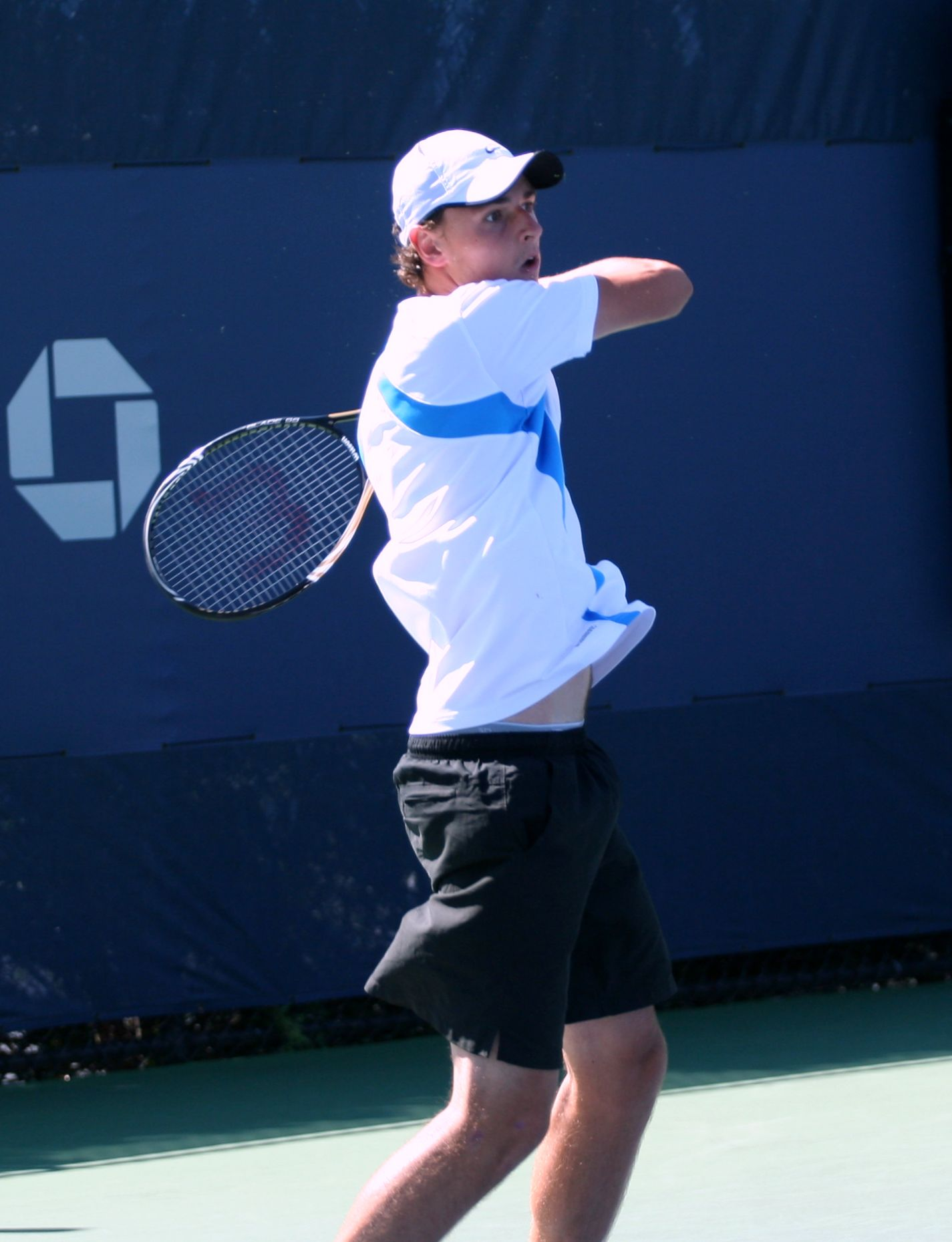
- Country (sports): Moldova (2007-2015); Belarus (2015-present)
- Born: 24 June 1993 (age 32) Chișinău, Moldova
- Plays: Right-handed (double-handed backhand)
- Prize money: US$72,927

Singles
- Career record: 6–8 (in ATP (World) Tour and Grand Slam main draw matches, and in Davis Cup)
- Career titles: 0 (ATP (World) Tour and Grand Slam)
- Highest ranking: No. 260 (3 August 2015)

Grand Slam singles results
- Australian Open Junior: 1R (2011)
- French Open Junior: 1R (2011)
- Wimbledon Junior: 1R (2011)
- US Open Junior: 1R (2011)

Doubles
- Career record: 1–2 (in ATP (World) Tour and Grand Slam main draw matches, and in Davis Cup)
- Career titles: 0 (ATP (World) Tour and Grand Slam)
- Highest ranking: No. 401 (26 August 2013)

Grand Slam doubles results
- Australian Open Junior: 1R (2011)
- French Open Junior: SF (2011)
- Wimbledon Junior: QF (2011)
- US Open Junior: F (2011)
- Last updated on: 5 July 2017.

Maxim Igorevich Dubarenco (Belarusian: Максім Ігаравіч Дубарэнка; Russian: Максим Игоревич Дубаренко; born 24 June 1993 in Chișinău, Moldova) is a Moldovan-born Belarusian tennis player.

He represented Moldova until 2015. As a member of the Moldova Davis Cup team he had a win–loss record of 7–10.

== Junior Grand Slam finals ==
=== Doubles: 1 final (1 runner-up) ===
Outcome	Year	Tournament	Surface	Partner	Opponents in the final	Score
Runner-up	2011	US Open	Hard	(Ukraine) Vladyslav Manafov	(Germany) Robin Kern (Germany) Julian Lenz	5–7, 4–6

== Challenger and Futures finals ==
=== Singles: 13 (10–3) ===
Legend (singles) ATP Challenger Tour (0–0) ITF Futures Tour (10–3)	Titles by surface Hard (3–2) Clay (7–1) Grass (0–0) Carpet (0–0)

Result	W–L	Date	Tournament	Tier	Surface	Opponent	Score
Win	1–0	Aug 2012	Romania F8, Mediaș	Futures	Clay	(Romania) Andrei Mlendea	6–3, 7–5
Loss	1–1	Mar 2013	Ukraine F2, Cherkasy	Futures	Hard (i)	(Ukraine) Artem Smirnov	6–7^{(2–7)}, 2–6
Loss	1–2	Jun 2013	Slovenia F2, Maribor	Futures	Clay	(Austria) Nicolas Reissig	4–6, 4–6
Win	2–2	Aug 2013	Romania F9, Mediaș	Futures	Clay	(Italy) Claudio Fortuna	7–5, 6–1
Win	3–2	Nov 2013	Turkey F43, Belek	Futures	Hard	(Moldova) Andrei Ciumac	4–1 ret.
Win	4–2	May 2014	Romania F2, Bucharest	Futures	Clay	(Romania) Dragoș Dima	5–7, 6–3, 6–1
Win	5–2	Aug 2014	Lithuania F1, Vilnius	Futures	Clay	(Lithuania) Lukas Mugevičius	6–1, 6–4
Loss	5–3	Oct 2014	Belarus F3, Minsk	Futures	Hard (i)	(Belarus) Dzmitry Zhyrmont	2–6, 6–3, 6–7^{(5–7)}
Win	6–3	Apr 2015	Greece F3, Heraklion	Futures	Hard	(Italy) Edoardo Eremin	6–7^{(3–7)}, 6–2, 6–3
Win	7–3	May 2015	Romania F2, Galați	Futures	Clay	(Kazakhstan) Dmitry Popko	7–6^{(7–5)}, 6–3
Win	8–3	Jun 2015	Russia F4, Kazan	Futures	Clay	(Russia) Anton Desyatnik	6–0, 6–1
Win	9–3	Apr 2016	Greece F2, Heraklion	Futures	Hard	(Serbia) Miki Janković	6–3, 6–7^{(2–7)}, 6–3
Win	10–3	Apr 2016	Kazakhstan F3, Shymkent	Futures	Clay	(Serbia) Miki Janković	6–3, 7–6^{(7–4)}
