= Miki Janković =

Serbian tennis player and coach

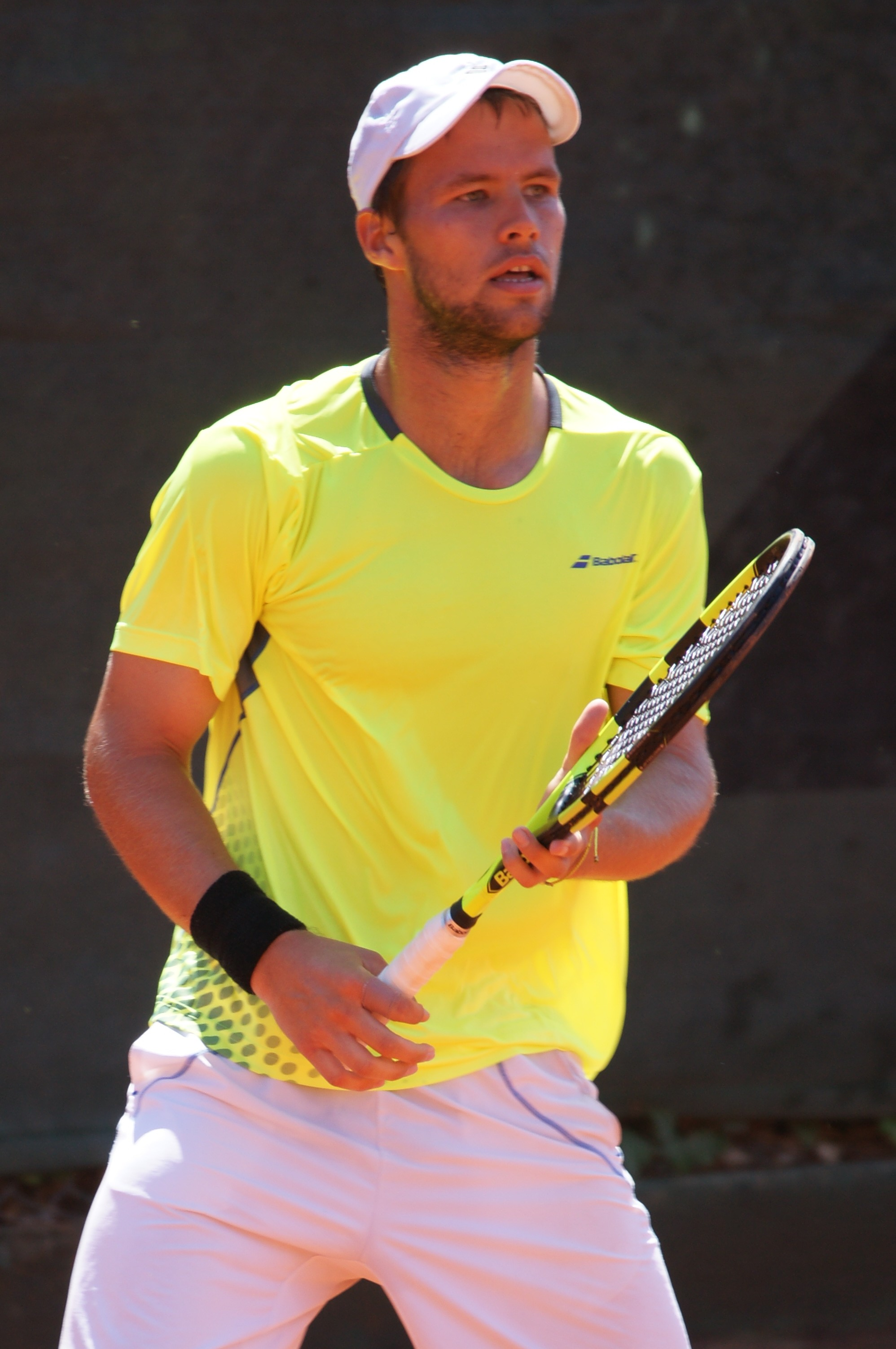
- Miki Janković at the 2016 Open de Nice Côte d'Azur
- Country (sports): Serbia
- Born: 26 September 1994 (age 31) Belgrade, Serbia, FR Yugoslavia
- Height: 1.80 m (5 ft 11 in)
- Turned pro: 2011
- Retired: 25 September 2017
- Plays: Right-handed (two handed-backhand)
- Coach: Gilbert Schaller
- Prize money: $72,376

Singles
- Career record: 0–0 (ATP Tour level, Grand Slam level, and Davis Cup)
- Career titles: 0; 4 Futures
- Highest ranking: No. 256 (1 August 2016)

Grand Slam singles results
- Australian Open Junior: 2R (2011)
- French Open Junior: QF (2011)

Doubles
- Career record: 0–2 (ATP Tour level, Grand Slam level, and Davis Cup)
- Career titles: 0; 4 Futures
- Highest ranking: No. 432 (31 October 2016)

Grand Slam doubles results
- Australian Open Junior: 1R (2011)
- French Open Junior: SF (2011)

Miki Janković (Serbian: Мики Јанковић, pronounced [jǎːŋkoʋitɕ]; born 26 September 1994) is a Serbian tennis coach and former professional tennis player. He participated as a doubles player in a Serbian squad that won 2012 World Team Cup.

In September 2017, due to recurring hip injuries, Janković decided to retire as a professional player and start a coaching career.

== Team competition finals: 1 (1–0) ==
Outcome	No.	Date	Team competition	Surface	Partner/Team	Opponents	Score
Winner	1.	May 21, 2012	World Team Cup, Düsseldorf, Germany	Clay	(Serbia) Janko Tipsarević (Serbia) Viktor Troicki (Serbia) Nenad Zimonjić (Serbia) Miki Janković	(Czech Republic) Tomáš Berdych (Czech Republic) Radek Štěpánek (Czech Republic) František Čermák	3–0
