= 2011 French Open – Wheelchair women's singles =

Wheelchair women's singles
- 2011 French Open

Final
- Champion: (Netherlands) Esther Vergeer
- Runner-up: (Netherlands) Marjolein Buis
- Score: 6–0, 6–2

Events
Singles	men	women		boys	girls
Doubles	men	women	mixed	boys	girls
WC Singles	men	women	quad
WC Doubles	men	women	quad
Legends	−45	45+	women
- French Open

Four-time defending champion Esther Vergeer defeated Marjolein Buis in the final, 6–0, 6–2 to win the women's singles wheelchair tennis title at the 2011 French Open. It was Buis' first major singles final.

== Seeds ==
1. (Netherlands) Esther Vergeer (champion)
2. (Netherlands) Jiske Griffioen (semifinals)

== Draw ==
Key

- Q = Qualifier
- WC = Wild card
- LL = Lucky loser
- Alt = Alternate
- ITF = ITF entry
- PR = Protected ranking
- SR = Special ranking
- SE = Special exempt
- JE = Junior exempt
- JR = Junior Accelerator Programme entrant
- CO = College Accelerator Programme entrant
- NG = Next Gen Accelerator Program entrant
- w/o = Walkover
- r = Retired
- d = Defaulted

=== Finals ===
Quarterfinals
1	(Netherlands) Esther Vergeer	6	6
(Belgium) Annick Sevenans	3	2
(Netherlands) Aniek van Koot	7	7
(Netherlands) Sharon Walraven	5	5
(Netherlands) Marjolein Buis	7^{7}	6
(United Kingdom) Jordanne Whiley	6^{3}	3
WC	(Germany) Sabine Ellerbrock	2	2
2	(Netherlands) Jiske Griffioen	6	6

Semifinals
1	(Netherlands) Esther Vergeer	6	6
(Netherlands) Aniek van Koot	0	0
(Netherlands) Marjolein Buis	6^{4}	7	7
2	(Netherlands) Jiske Griffioen	7	5	5

Final
1	(Netherlands) Esther Vergeer	6	6
(Netherlands) Marjolein Buis	0	2
