= 2011 French Open – Wheelchair men's singles =

Wheelchair men's singles
- 2011 French Open

Final
- Champion: (Netherlands) Maikel Scheffers
- Runner-up: (France) Nicolas Peifer
- Score: 7–6^{(7–3)}, 6–3

Events
| Singles | men | women | | boys | girls |
| Doubles | men | women | mixed | boys | girls |
| WC Singles | men | women | quad |
| WC Doubles | men | women | quad |
| Legends | −45 | 45+ | women |
- French Open

Maikel Scheffers defeated Nicolas Peifer in the final, 7–6^{(7–3)}, 6–3 to win the men's singles wheelchair tennis title at the 2011 French Open. It was his first French Open singles title.

Shingo Kunieda was the four-time defending champion, but was defeated by Scheffers in the semifinals. It was Kunieda's first defeat in a major.

== Seeds ==
1. (Japan) Shingo Kunieda (semifinals)
2. (France) Stéphane Houdet (semifinals)

== Draw ==
Key

- Q = Qualifier
- WC = Wild card
- LL = Lucky loser
- Alt = Alternate
- ITF = ITF entry
- PR = Protected ranking
- SR = Special ranking
- SE = Special exempt
- JE = Junior exempt
- JR = Junior Accelerator Programme entrant
- CO = College Accelerator Programme entrant
- NG = Next Gen Accelerator Program entrant
- w/o = Walkover
- r = Retired
- d = Defaulted

=== Finals ===
Quarterfinals
1 | (Japan) Shingo Kunieda | 6 | 7^{7}
(Sweden) Stefan Olsson | 1 | 6^{4}
(Netherlands) Robin Ammerlaan | 2 | 4
(Netherlands) Maikel Scheffers | 6 | 6
(France) Nicolas Peifer | 6 | 6
WC | (France) Michaël Jérémiasz | 4 | 1
(Netherlands) Ronald Vink | 6^{5} | 3
2 | (France) Stéphane Houdet | 7^{7} | 6

Semifinals
1 | (Japan) Shingo Kunieda | 6 | 3 | 6^{5}
(Netherlands) Maikel Scheffers | 3 | 6 | 7^{7}
(France) Nicolas Peifer | 7 | 7
2 | (France) Stéphane Houdet | 5 | 5

Final
(Netherlands) Maikel Scheffers | 7^{7} | 6
(France) Nicolas Peifer | 6^{3} | 3
