= 2011 French Open – Girls' doubles =

Girls' doubles
- 2011 French Open

Final
- Champions: (Russia) Irina Khromacheva (Ukraine) Maryna Zanevska
- Runners-up: (Russia) Victoria Kan (Netherlands) Demi Schuurs
- Score: 6–4, 7–5

Events
Singles	men	women		boys	girls
Doubles	men	women	mixed	boys	girls
WC Singles	men	women	quad
WC Doubles	men	women	quad
Legends	−45	45+	women
← 2010 ·	French Open	· 2012 →

Tímea Babos and Sloane Stephens were the defending champions, but they chose to not participate this year.

Irina Khromacheva and Maryna Zanevska won the tournament, defeating Victoria Kan and Demi Schuurs in the final, 6–4, 7–5.

== Seeds ==
1. (Serbia) Natalija Kostić / (Montenegro) Danka Kovinić (second round)
2. (Russia) Irina Khromacheva / (Ukraine) Maryna Zanevska (champions)
3. (Tunisia) Ons Jabeur / (Belgium) Alison Van Uytvanck (quarterfinals)
4. (Japan) Miyu Kato / (Japan) Miho Kowase (first round)
5. (Ecuador) Doménica González / (Paraguay) Montserrat González (first round)
6. (Netherlands) Indy de Vroome / (Ukraine) Ganna Poznikhirenko (second round)
7. (Serbia) Jovana Jakšić / (Colombia) Yuliana Lizarazo (second round)
8. (Slovakia) Jana Čepelová / (Slovakia) Chantal Škamlová (quarterfinals)

== Draw ==
=== Key ===
- Q = Qualifier
- WC = Wild card
- LL = Lucky loser
- Alt = Alternate
- SE = Special exempt
- PR = Protected ranking
- ITF = ITF entry
- JE = Junior exempt
- w/o = Walkover
- r = Retired
- d = Defaulted
- SR = Special ranking

=== Finals ===
Semifinals
(Russia) Victoria Kan (Netherlands) Demi Schuurs	6	7
(Japan) Makoto Ninomiya (Japan) Risa Ozaki	0	5
(China) Tang Haochen (China) Tian Ran	3	0
2	(Russia) Irina Khromacheva (Ukraine) Maryna Zanevska	6	6

Final
(Russia) Victoria Kan (Netherlands) Demi Schuurs	4	5
2	(Russia) Irina Khromacheva (Ukraine) Maryna Zanevska	6	7

=== Top half ===
First round
1	(Serbia) Natalija Kostić (Montenegro) Danka Kovinić	6	6
(Czech Republic) Klára Fabíková (Estonia) Anett Kontaveit	4	3
(Sweden) Ellen Allgurin (Austria) Barbara Haas	1	3
(Russia) Victoria Kan (Netherlands) Demi Schuurs	6	6
(United States) Stephanie Nauta (Croatia) Donna Vekić	2	6	[11]
WC	(France) Marine Partaud (France) Jade Suvrijn	6	4	[13]
(Slovakia) Viktória Maľová (Argentina) Catalina Pella	0	2
8	(Slovakia) Jana Čepelová (Slovakia) Chantal Škamlová	6	6
3	(Tunisia) Ons Jabeur (Belgium) Alison Van Uytvanck	1	7^{8}	[10]
(Ukraine) Valentyna Ivakhnenko (Ukraine) Kateryna Kozlova	6	6^{6}	[5]
(Belarus) Ilona Kremen (New Caledonia) Anaève Pain	6	5	[10]
WC	(France) Audrey Albié (France) Manon Arcangioli	3	7	[8]
(Japan) Eri Hozumi (Uzbekistan) Sabina Sharipova	6^{2}	2
(Japan) Makoto Ninomiya (Japan) Risa Ozaki	7^{7}	6
(Ecuador) Marie Elise Casares (Brazil) Beatriz Haddad Maia	3	3
7	(Serbia) Jovana Jakšić (Colombia) Yuliana Lizarazo	6	6

Second round
1	(Serbia) N Kostić (Montenegro) D Kovinić	6	3	[10]
(Russia) V Kan (Netherlands) D Schuurs	4	6	[12]
WC	(France) M Partaud (France) J Suvrijn	7	2	[8]
8	(Slovakia) J Čepelová (Slovakia) C Škamlová	5	6	[10]
3	(Tunisia) O Jabeur (Belgium) A Van Uytvanck	5	7^{10}	[10]
(Belarus) I Kremen (New Caledonia) A Pain	7	6^{8}	[7]
(Japan) M Ninomiya (Japan) R Ozaki	6	6
7	(Serbia) J Jakšić (Colombia) Y Lizarazo	2	3

Quarterfinals
(Russia) V Kan (Netherlands) D Schuurs	7	6
8	(Slovakia) J Čepelová (Slovakia) C Škamlová	5	2
3	(Tunisia) O Jabeur (Belgium) A Van Uytvanck	3	7^{8}	[10]
(Japan) M Ninomiya (Japan) R Ozaki	6	6^{6}	[12]

Semifinals
(Russia) V Kan (Netherlands) D Schuurs	6	7
(Japan) M Ninomiya (Japan) R Ozaki	0	5

=== Bottom half ===
First round
5	(Ecuador) Doménica González (Paraguay) Montserrat González	5	4
(Romania) Cristina Dinu (Bulgaria) Viktoriya Tomova	7	6
(Czech Republic) Jesika Malečková (Czech Republic) Petra Rohanová	4	3
(Australia) Ashleigh Barty (United States) Victoria Duval	6	6
WC	(Japan) Ayaka Okuno (France) Léa Tholey	1	6^{7}
(France) Chloé Paquet (France) Charlène Seateun	6	7^{9}
(China) Tang Haochen (China) Tian Ran	6	6
4	(Japan) Miyu Kato (Japan) Miho Kowase	3	0
6	(Netherlands) Indy de Vroome (Ukraine) Ganna Poznikhirenko	6	4	[10]
(United States) Christina Makarova (Madagascar) Zarah Razafimahatratra	2	6	[4]
(Argentina) Victoria Bosio (Peru) Patricia Kú Flores	7	7
(Slovakia) Lucia Butkovská (Slovakia) Anna Karolína Schmiedlová	5	5
WC	(France) Lou Brouleau (France) Estelle Cascino	3	6^{11}
(Romania) Ilka Csöregi (Ukraine) Sofiya Kovalets	6	7^{13}
(Belarus) Aliaksandra Sasnovich (Canada) Carol Zhao	2	1
2	(Russia) Irina Khromacheva (Ukraine) Maryna Zanevska	6	6

Second round
(Romania) C Dinu (Bulgaria) V Tomova	4	4
(Australia) A Barty (United States) V Duval	6	6
(France) C Paquet (France) C Seateun	4	0
(China) H Tang (China) R Tian	6	6
6	(Netherlands) I de Vroome (Ukraine) G Poznikhirenko	7^{7}	2	[9]
(Argentina) V Bosio (Peru) P Kú Flores	6^{1}	6	[11]
(Romania) I Csöregi (Ukraine) S Kovalets	2	0
2	(Russia) I Khromacheva (Ukraine) M Zanevska	6	6

Quarterfinals
(Australia) A Barty (United States) V Duval	5	3
(China) H Tang (China) R Tian	7	6
(Argentina) V Bosio (Peru) P Kú Flores	4	1
2	(Russia) I Khromacheva (Ukraine) M Zanevska	6	6

Semifinals
(China) H Tang (China) R Tian	3	0
2	(Russia) I Khromacheva (Ukraine) M Zanevska	6	6
