= 2011 French Open – Boys' doubles =

Boys' doubles
- 2011 French Open

Final
- Champions: (Argentina) Jonathan Coscione Seid (Argentina) Nicolás Zaccaria
- Runners-up: (United States) Mitchell Krueger (United States) Shane Vinsant
- Score: 5–7, 7–6^{(7–5)}, [10–5]

Events
Singles	men	women		boys	girls
Doubles	men	women	mixed	boys	girls
WC Singles	men	women	quad
WC Doubles	men	women	quad
Legends	−45	45+	women
- French Open

Duilio Beretta and Roberto Quiroz were the defending champions, but they chose not to compete this year.

Andrés Artuñedo and Roberto Carballés won in the final 5–7, 7–6^{(7–5)}, [10–5] against Mitchell Krueger and Shane Vinsant.

== Seeds ==
1. (United Kingdom) Oliver Golding / (Czech Republic) Jiří Veselý (quarterfinals)
2. (United Kingdom) George Morgan / (Croatia) Mate Pavić (second round)
3. (Bolivia) Hugo Dellien / (Ecuador) Diego Hidalgo (second round)
4. (Spain) Andrés Artuñedo / (Spain) Roberto Carballés (champions)
5. (Australia) Luke Saville / (Brazil) João Pedro Sorgi (second round)
6. (Croatia) Mate Delić / (Slovakia) Filip Horanský (first round)
7. (Brazil) Thiago Moura Monteiro / (Brazil) Bruno Sant'anna (second round)
8. (Australia) Ben Wagland / (Australia) Andrew Whittington (first round)

== Draw ==
Key

- Q = Qualifier
- WC = Wild card
- LL = Lucky loser
- Alt = Alternate
- ITF = ITF entry
- PR = Protected ranking
- SR = Special ranking
- SE = Special exempt
- JE = Junior exempt
- JR = Junior Accelerator Programme entrant
- CO = College Accelerator Programme entrant
- NG = Next Gen Accelerator Program entrant
- w/o = Walkover
- r = Retired
- d = Defaulted

=== Finals ===
Semifinals
(United States) Mitchell Krueger (United States) Shane Vinsant	6	6
(Serbia) Miki Janković (Bulgaria) Dimitar Kuzmanov	2	2
4	(Spain) Andrés Artuñedo (Spain) Roberto Carballés	7	3	[10]
(Moldova) Maxim Dubarenco (Ukraine) Vladyslav Manafov	5	6	[8]

Final
(United States) Mitchell Krueger (United States) Shane Vinsant	7	6^{5}	[5]
4	(Spain) Andrés Artuñedo (Spain) Roberto Carballés	5	7^{7}	[10]

=== Top half ===
First round
1	(United Kingdom) Oliver Golding (Czech Republic) Jiří Veselý	6	6
WC	(France) Grégoire Barrère (France) Michael Bois	1	2
(Belgium) Joris De Loore (Netherlands) Jannick Lupescu	6	3	[7]
(Sweden) Stefan Lindmark (Czech Republic) Lukáš Vrňák	2	6	[10]
(Serbia) Peđa Krstin (Romania) Teodor Nicolae Marin	2	7^{7}	[6]
(United States) Mitchell Krueger (United States) Shane Vinsant	6	6^{1}	[10]
(United States) Dennis Novikov (Belarus) Yaraslav Shyla	6	7
8	(Australia) Ben Wagland (Australia) Andrew Whittington	4	6^{7}
3	(Bolivia) Hugo Dellien (Ecuador) Diego Hidalgo	6	6
(United States) Marcos Giron (Canada) Filip Peliwo	1	2
(Germany) Robin Kern (Austria) Patrick Ofner	2	3
(Spain) Axel Álvarez Llamas (Spain) Oriol Roca Batalla	6	6
(Germany) Julian Lenz (Austria) Dominic Thiem	4	2
WC	(France) Sébastien Boltz (France) Armel Rancezot	6	6
(Serbia) Miki Janković (Bulgaria) Dimitar Kuzmanov	6	7
6	(Croatia) Mate Delić (Slovakia) Filip Horanský	2	5

Second round
1	(United Kingdom) O Golding (Czech Republic) J Veselý	6	6
(Sweden) S Lindmark (Czech Republic) L Vrňák	3	2
(United States) M Krueger (United States) S Vinsant	7	6
(United States) D Novikov (Belarus) Y Shyla	5	2
3	(Bolivia) H Dellien (Ecuador) D Hidalgo	5	6	[1]
(Spain) A Álvarez Llamas (Spain) O Roca Batalla	7	3	[10]
WC	(France) S Boltz (France) A Rancezot	3	6^{0}
(Serbia) M Janković (Bulgaria) D Kuzmanov	6	7^{7}

Quarterfinals
1	(United Kingdom) O Golding (Czech Republic) J Veselý	4	6	[8]
(United States) M Krueger (United States) S Vinsant	6	4	[10]
(Spain) A Álvarez Llamas (Spain) O Roca Batalla	3	2
(Serbia) M Janković (Bulgaria) D Kuzmanov	6	6

Semifinals
(United States) M Krueger (United States) S Vinsant	6	6
(Serbia) M Janković (Bulgaria) D Kuzmanov	2	2

=== Bottom half ===
First round
5	(Australia) Luke Saville (Brazil) João Pedro Sorgi	6	6
(France) Enzo Couacaud (Mexico) Luis Patiño	4	3
(United States) Bjorn Fratangelo (United States) Alexios Halebian	6	3	[10]
WC	(France) Alexandre Favrot (France) Laurent Lokoli	2	6	[3]
(United Kingdom) Kyle Edmund (South Africa) Wayne Montgomery	6	6
(Belgium) Julien Cagnina (Belgium) Kimmer Coppejans	1	2
(Mexico) Marco Aurelio Núñez (Japan) Kaichi Uchida	2	7	[5]
4	(Spain) Andrés Artuñedo (Spain) Roberto Carballés	6	5	[10]
7	(Brazil) Thiago Moura Monteiro (Brazil) Bruno Sant'anna	6	6
(Australia) Sean Berman (New Zealand) Jaden Grinter	2	4
(United States) Connor Farren (United States) Mac Styslinger	3	2
(Moldova) Maxim Dubarenco (Ukraine) Vladyslav Manafov	6	6
WC	(France) Tristan Lamasine (France) Mick Lescure	3	3
(Russia) Aslan Karatsev (Russia) Evgeny Karlovskiy	6	6
(Serbia) Nikola Milojević (Chile) Matías Sborowitz	6^{5}	2
2	(United Kingdom) George Morgan (Croatia) Mate Pavić	7^{7}	6

Second round
5	(Australia) L Saville (Brazil) JP Sorgi	6^{4}	6	[7]
(United States) B Fratangelo (United States) A Halebian	7^{7}	4	[10]
(United Kingdom) K Edmund (South Africa) W Montgomery
4	(Spain) A Artuñedo (Spain) R Carballes	w/o
7	(Brazil) TM Monteiro (Brazil) B Sant'anna	6	5	[14]
(Moldova) M Dubarenco (Ukraine) V Manafov	3	7	[16]
(Russia) A Karatsev (Russia) E Karlovskiy	4	7	[12]
2	(United Kingdom) G Morgan (Croatia) M Pavić	6	5	[10]

Quarterfinals
(United States) B Fratangelo (United States) A Halebian	1	3
4	(Spain) A Artuñedo (Spain) R Carballes	6	6
(Moldova) M Dubarenco (Ukraine) V Manafov	6	6
(Russia) A Karatsev (Russia) E Karlovskiy	1	4

Semifinals
4	(Spain) A Artuñedo (Spain) R Carballes	7	3	[10]
(Moldova) M Dubarenco (Ukraine) V Manafov	5	6	[8]
