= 2011 French Open – Girls' singles =

Girls' singles
- 2011 French Open

Final
- Champion: (Tunisia) Ons Jabeur
- Runner-up: (Puerto Rico) Monica Puig
- Score: 7–6^{(10–8)}, 6–1

Events
| Singles | men | women | | boys | girls |
| Doubles | men | women | mixed | boys | girls |
| WC Singles | men | women | quad |
| WC Doubles | men | women | quad |
| Legends | −45 | 45+ | women |
| ← 2010 · | French Open | · 2012 → |

Ons Jabeur won the title, defeating Monica Puig, in the final, 7–6^{(10–8)}, 6–1. She became the first girl from North Africa to win a junior Grand Slam title.

Elina Svitolina was the defending champion, but chose not to participate. She received a wildcard into the women's singles qualifying competition where she lost to Anastasia Pivovarova in the first round.

== Seeds ==
1. (Russia) Daria Gavrilova (quarterfinals)
2. (Russia) Irina Khromacheva (semifinals)
3. (France) Caroline Garcia (semifinals)
4. (Serbia) Natalija Kostić (quarterfinals)
5. (Puerto Rico) Monica Puig (final)
6. (Montenegro) Danka Kovinić (third round)
7. (Russia) Yulia Putintseva (quarterfinals)
8. (Paraguay) Montserrat González (second round)
9. (Tunisia) Ons Jabeur (champion)
10. (Japan) Miho Kowase (first round)
11. (Belgium) Alison Van Uytvanck (third round)
12. (Ukraine) Ganna Poznikhirenko (first round)
13. (Russia) Daria Salnikova (second round)
14. (Ukraine) Maryna Zanevska (third round)
15. (Ukraine) Kateryna Kozlova (first round)
16. (Argentina) Victoria Bosio (first round)

== Main draw ==
=== Key ===
- Q = Qualifier
- WC = Wild card
- LL = Lucky loser
- Alt = Alternate
- SE = Special exempt
- PR = Protected ranking
- ITF = ITF entry
- JE = Junior exempt
- w/o = Walkover
- r = Retired
- d = Defaulted
- SR = Special ranking

=== Finals ===
Quarterfinals
1 | (Russia) Daria Gavrilova | 6 | 2 | 3
9 | (Tunisia) Ons Jabeur | 4 | 6 | 6
3 | (France) Caroline Garcia | 6 | 6
7 | (Russia) Yulia Putintseva | 2 | 4
5 | (Puerto Rico) Monica Puig | 6 | 6
4 | (Serbia) Natalija Kostić | 1 | 3
(Estonia) Anett Kontaveit | 4 | 1
2 | (Russia) Irina Khromacheva | 6 | 6

Semifinals
9 | (Tunisia) Ons Jabeur | 6 | 1 | 6
3 | (France) Caroline Garcia | 2 | 6 | 2
5 | (Puerto Rico) Monica Puig | 6 | 1 | 7
2 | (Russia) Irina Khromacheva | 3 | 6 | 5

Final
9 | (Tunisia) Ons Jabeur | 7^{10} | 6
5 | (Puerto Rico) Monica Puig | 6^{8} | 1

=== Top half ===
==== Section 1 ====
First round
1 | (Russia) Daria Gavrilova | 6 | 6
WC | (France) Charlene Seateun | 2 | 4
(Slovakia) Viktória Maľová | 7 | 2 | 4
(Serbia) Jovana Jakšić | 5 | 6 | 6
(Romania) Cristina Dinu | 7 | 6
WC | (France) Jade Suvrijn | 5 | 4
(Ecuador) Doménica González | 4 | 4
14 | (Ukraine) Maryna Zanevska | 6 | 6
9 | (Tunisia) Ons Jabeur | 6 | 6
(Japan) Makoto Ninomiya | 3 | 2
Q | (China) Tang Haochen | 5 | 6 | 2
(Belarus) Aliaksandra Sasnovich | 7 | 4 | 6
WC | (France) Estelle Cascino | 7^{7} | 5 | 6
(Czech Republic) Petra Rohanová | 6^{3} | 7 | 3
(Slovakia) Lucia Butkovská | 6^{5} | 7 | 1
8 | (Paraguay) Montserrat González | 7^{7} | 5 | 6

Second round
1 | (Russia) D Gavrilova | 6 | 7
(Serbia) J Jakšić | 4 | 5
(Romania) C Dinu | 6^{5} | 1
14 | (Ukraine) M Zanevska | 7^{7} | 6
9 | (Tunisia) O Jabeur | 6 | 6
(Belarus) A Sasnovich | 4 | 2
WC | (France) E Cascino | 6 | 6
8 | (Paraguay) M González | 4 | 2

Third round
1 | (Russia) D Gavrilova | 6 | 6
14 | (Ukraine) M Zanevska | 0 | 2
9 | (Tunisia) O Jabeur | 6 | 6
WC | (France) E Cascino | 0 | 4

Quarterfinals
1 | (Russia) D Gavrilova | 6 | 2 | 3
9 | (Tunisia) O Jabeur | 4 | 6 | 6

==== Section 2 ====
First round
3 | (France) Caroline Garcia | 6 | 6
(Russia) Victoria Kan | 1 | 4
Q | (Argentina) Catalina Pella | 2 | 7^{7} | 6
Q | (Japan) Risa Ozaki | 6 | 6^{1} | 1
LL | (United States) Stephanie Nauta | 3 | 6 | 4
(Peru) Patricia Kú Flores | 6 | 2 | 6
(Slovakia) Jana Čepelová | 6 | 0 | 6
15 | (Ukraine) Kateryna Kozlova | 4 | 6 | 2
11 | (Belgium) Alison Van Uytvanck | 6 | 6
Q | (Brazil) Beatriz Haddad Maia | 3 | 1
(Austria) Barbara Haas | 6 | 5 | 6
(Netherlands) Demi Schuurs | 2 | 7 | 0
(Uzbekistan) Sabina Sharipova | 7^{9} | 6
WC | (France) Amandine Hesse | 6^{7} | 3
(Madagascar) Zarah Razafimahatratra | 1 | 6 | 2
7 | (Russia) Yulia Putintseva | 6 | 1 | 6

Second round
3 | (France) C Garcia | 4 | 6 | 9
Q | (Argentina) C Pella | 6 | 2 | 7
(Peru) P Kú Flores | 0 | 1
(Slovakia) J Čepelová | 6 | 6
11 | (Belgium) A Van Uytvanck | 6 | 6
(Austria) B Haas | 4 | 1
(Uzbekistan) S Sharipova | 3 | 1
7 | (Russia) Y Putintseva | 6 | 6

Third round
3 | (France) C Garcia | 7^{7} | 6
(Slovakia) J Čepelová | 6^{4} | 4
11 | (Belgium) A Van Uytvanck | 6 | 1 | 2
7 | (Russia) Y Putintseva | 3 | 6 | 6

Quarterfinals
3 | (France) C Garcia | 6 | 6
7 | (Russia) Y Putintseva | 2 | 4

=== Bottom half ===
==== Section 3 ====
First round
5 | (Puerto Rico) Monica Puig | 6 | 6
(Bulgaria) Viktoriya Tomova | 2 | 2
WC | (France) Marine Partaud | 6 | 6
(Czech Republic) Jesika Malečková | 2 | 2
(Slovakia) Anna Karolína Schmiedlová | 4 | 4
(Sweden) Ellen Allgurin | 6 | 6
(Ukraine) Sofiya Kovalets | 6 | 6
10 | (Japan) Miho Kowase | 2 | 3
13 | (Russia) Daria Salnikova | 6 | 6
WC | (New Caledonia) Anaève Pain | 3 | 2
Q | (Ukraine) Valentyna Ivakhnenko | 2 | 3
(United States) Victoria Duval | 6 | 6
(Colombia) Yuliana Lizarazo | 6 | 6
(Netherlands) Indy de Vroome | 2 | 4
WC | (France) Lou Brouleau | 3 | 0
4 | (Serbia) Natalija Kostić | 6 | 6

Second round
5 | (Puerto Rico) M Puig | 6 | 6
WC | (France) M Partaud | 4 | 0
(Sweden) E Allgurin | 0 | 4
(Ukraine) S Kovalets | 6 | 6
13 | (Russia) D Salnikova | 1 | 4
(United States) V Duval | 6 | 6
(Colombia) Y Lizarazo | 4 | 6 | 3
4 | (Serbia) N Kostić | 6 | 3 | 6

Third round
5 | (Puerto Rico) M Puig | 4 | 6 | 6
(Ukraine) S Kovalets | 6 | 1 | 1
(United States) V Duval | 4 | 6 | 2
4 | (Serbia) N Kostić | 6 | 4 | 6

Quarterfinals
5 | (Puerto Rico) M Puig | 6 | 6
4 | (Serbia) N Kostić | 1 | 3

==== Section 4 ====
First round
6 | (Montenegro) Danka Kovinić | 6 | 6
Q | (Ecuador) Marie Elise Casares | 0 | 3
(Romania) Ilka Csöregi | 6 | 6
WC | (France) Léa Tholey | 4 | 1
(Estonia) Anett Kontaveit | 6 | 6
(Slovakia) Chantal Škamlová | 0 | 3
(Australia) Ashleigh Barty | 6^{9} | 7^{10} | 6
12 | (Ukraine) Ganna Poznikhirenko | 7^{11} | 6^{8} | 3
16 | (Argentina) Victoria Bosio | 1 | 2
(Japan) Miyu Kato | 6 | 6
Q | (France) Chloé Paquet | 2 | 2
(Croatia) Donna Vekić | 6 | 6
(Belarus) Ilona Kremen | 4 | 3
Q | (Canada) Carol Zhao | 6 | 6
(United States) Christina Makarova | 2 | 1
2 | (Russia) Irina Khromacheva | 6 | 6

Second round
6 | (Montenegro) D Kovinić | 7^{7} | 6
(Romania) I Csöregi | 6^{1} | 1
(Estonia) A Kontaveit | 7^{7} | 6
(Australia) A Barty | 6^{5} | 2
(Japan) M Kato | 6 | 1 | 4
(Croatia) D Vekić | 4 | 6 | 6
Q | (Canada) C Zhao | 3 | 4
2 | (Russia) I Khromacheva | 6 | 6

Third round
6 | (Montenegro) D Kovinić | 3 | 6 | 5
(Estonia) A Kontaveit | 6 | 3 | 7
(Croatia) D Vekić | 4 | 2
2 | (Russia) I Khromacheva | 6 | 6

Quarterfinals
(Estonia) A Kontaveit | 4 | 1
2 | (Russia) I Khromacheva | 6 | 6
