= 2011 French Open – Wheelchair women's doubles =

Wheelchair women's doubles
- 2011 French Open

Final
- Champions: (Netherlands) Esther Vergeer (Netherlands) Sharon Walraven
- Runners-up: (Netherlands) Jiske Griffioen (Netherlands) Aniek van Koot
- Score: 5–7, 6–4, [10–5]

Events
Singles	men	women		boys	girls
Doubles	men	women	mixed	boys	girls
WC Singles	men	women	quad
WC Doubles	men	women	quad
Legends	−45	45+	women
- French Open

Esther Vergeer and Sharon Walraven defeated the defending champion Aniek van Koot and her partner Jiske Griffioen in the final, 5–7, 6–4, [10–5] to win the women's doubles wheelchair tennis title at the 2011 French Open. It was their second step towards an eventual Grand Slam, and Walraven completed the career Super Slam with the win.

Daniela Di Toro and van Koot were the reigning champions, but Di Toro chose not to compete this year.

== Seeds ==
1. (Netherlands) Esther Vergeer / (Netherlands) Sharon Walraven (champions)
2. (Netherlands) Jiske Griffioen / (Netherlands) Aniek van Koot (final)

== Draw ==
Key

- Q = Qualifier
- WC = Wild card
- LL = Lucky loser
- Alt = Alternate
- ITF = ITF entry
- PR = Protected ranking
- SR = Special ranking
- SE = Special exempt
- JE = Junior exempt
- JR = Junior Accelerator Programme entrant
- CO = College Accelerator Programme entrant
- NG = Next Gen Accelerator Program entrant
- w/o = Walkover
- r = Retired
- d = Defaulted

=== Finals ===
Semifinals
1	(Netherlands) Esther Vergeer (Netherlands) Sharon Walraven	6	6
(Netherlands) Marjolein Buis (Belgium) Annick Sevenans	3	3
(Germany) Sabine Ellerbrock (United Kingdom) Jordanne Whiley	1	4
2	(Netherlands) Jiske Griffioen (Netherlands) Aniek van Koot	6	6

Final
1	(Netherlands) Esther Vergeer (Netherlands) Sharon Walraven	5	6	[10]
2	(Netherlands) Jiske Griffioen (Netherlands) Aniek van Koot	7	4	[5]
