= 2011 French Open – Boys' singles =

Boys' singles
- 2011 French Open

Final
- Champion: (United States) Bjorn Fratangelo
- Runner-up: (Austria) Dominic Thiem
- Score: 3–6, 6–3, 8–6

Events
Singles	men	women		boys	girls
Doubles	men	women	mixed	boys	girls
WC Singles	men	women	quad
WC Doubles	men	women	quad
Legends	−45	45+	women
← 2010 ·	French Open	· 2012 →

Agustín Velotti was the defending champion but was not eligible to participate.
Bjorn Fratangelo won this event, defeating 14th-seed Dominic Thiem 3–6, 6–3, 8–6 in the final.

== Seeds ==
1. (Czech Republic) Jiří Veselý (first round)
2. (Bolivia) Hugo Dellien (second round)
3. (Slovakia) Filip Horanský (third round)
4. (United Kingdom) Oliver Golding (quarterfinals)
5. (Spain) Roberto Carballés (third round)
6. (Brazil) Tiago Fernandes (first round, retired)
7. (Croatia) Mate Pavić (first round)
8. (Australia) Andrew Whittington (second round)
9. (United Kingdom) George Morgan (first round)
10. (Brazil) João Pedro Sorgi (third round)
11. (Belgium) Joris De Loore (third round)
12. (Austria) Patrick Ofner (first round)
13. (Brazil) Thiago Moura Monteiro (first round)
14. (Austria) Dominic Thiem (final)
15. (Australia) Luke Saville (first round)
16. (Brazil) Bruno Sant'anna (second round)

== Main draw ==
=== Key ===
- Q = Qualifier
- WC = Wild card
- LL = Lucky loser
- Alt = Alternate
- ITF = ITF entry
- PR = Protected ranking
- SR = Special ranking
- SE = Special exempt
- JE = Junior exempt
- JR = Junior Accelerator Programme entrant
- CO = College Accelerator Programme entrant
- NG = Next Gen Accelerator Program entrant
- w/o = Walkover
- r = Retired
- d = Defaulted

=== Finals ===
Quarterfinals
Q	(Serbia) Miki Janković	2	5
(Croatia) Mate Delić	6	7
14	(Austria) Dominic Thiem	6	6
Q	(Spain) Oriol Roca Batalla	3	2
(United States) Bjorn Fratangelo	6	6
4	(United Kingdom) Oliver Golding	1	1
(Germany) Robin Kern	4	6^{6}
WC	(France) Tristan Lamasine	6	7^{8}

Semifinals
(Croatia) Mate Delić	6	3	1
14	(Austria) Dominic Thiem	3	6	6
(United States) Bjorn Fratangelo	6	4	6
WC	(France) Tristan Lamasine	4	6	3

Final
14	(Austria) Dominic Thiem	6	3	6
(United States) Bjorn Fratangelo	3	6	8

=== Top half ===
==== Section 1 ====
First round
1	(Czech Republic) Jiří Veselý	6	1	4
(Belarus) Yaraslav Shyla	4	6	6
WC	(France) Armel Rancezot	6	3	2
(United States) Shane Vinsant	3	6	6
(South Africa) Wayne Montgomery	5	2
Q	(Serbia) Miki Janković	7	6
(Belgium) Kimmer Coppejans	6	3	4
16	(Brazil) Bruno Sant'anna	4	6	6
9	(United Kingdom) George Morgan	6	7	5
(Croatia) Mate Delić	7	6	7
(United States) Alexios Halebian	4	6	6
WC	(France) Michael Bois	6	3	4
(Australia) Sean Berman	1	7	7
Q	(Italy) Gianluigi Quinzi	6	5	5
WC	(France) Grégoire Barrère	6^{5}	1
5	(Spain) Roberto Carballés	7^{7}	6

Second round
(Belarus) Y Shyla	6	7
(United States) S Vinsant	1	5
Q	(Serbia) M Janković	7	6
16	(Brazil) B Sant'anna	5	4
(Croatia) M Delić	6	7^{7}
(United States) A Halebian	1	6^{5}
(Australia) S Berman	3	6^{4}
5	(Spain) R Carballes	6	7^{7}

Third round
(Belarus) Y Shyla	6	5	1
Q	(Serbia) M Janković	3	7	6
(Croatia) M Delić	6^{2}	6	8
5	(Spain) R Carballes	7^{7}	2	6

Quarterfinals
Q	(Serbia) M Janković	2	5
(Croatia) M Delić	6	7

==== Section 2 ====
First round
3	(Slovakia) Filip Horanský	0	6	9
(Serbia) Peđa Krstin	6	2	7
(Belgium) Julien Cagnina	6	7^{7}
WC	(France) Alexandre Favrot	2	6^{4}
(Ukraine) Vladyslav Manafov	5	6	4
(United States) Mitchell Krueger	7	3	6
(United Kingdom) Kyle Edmund	3	2
14	(Austria) Dominic Thiem	6	6
10	(Brazil) João Pedro Sorgi	6	6
(Mexico) Marco Aurelio Núñez	4	1
(France) Enzo Couacaud	6	6
Q	(Russia) Aslan Karatsev	0	3
(Germany) Julian Lenz	1	6^{3}
Q	(Spain) Oriol Roca Batalla	6	7^{7}
Q	(Croatia) Filip Veger	6^{7}	4
8	(Australia) Andrew Whittington	7^{9}	6

Second round
3	(Slovakia) F Horanský	6	7^{7}
(Belgium) J Cagnina	3	6^{5}
(United States) M Krueger	3	2
14	(Austria) D Thiem	6	6
10	(Brazil) JP Sorgi	6	2	6
(France) E Couacaud	4	6	3
Q	(Spain) O Roca Batalla	6	6
8	(Australia) A Whittington	1	0

Third round
3	(Slovakia) F Horanský	4	1
14	(Austria) D Thiem	6	6
10	(Brazil) JP Sorgi	1	1
Q	(Spain) O Roca Batalla	6	6

Quarterfinals
14	(Austria) D Thiem	6	6
Q	(Spain) O Roca Batalla	3	2

=== Bottom half ===
==== Section 3 ====
First round
6	(Brazil) Tiago Fernandes	6	6^{1}	1^{r}
(Canada) Filip Peliwo	3	7^{7}	4
(United States) Bjorn Fratangelo	6	3	6
(Moldova) Maxim Dubarenco	4	6	1
(Serbia) Nikola Milojević	6^{5}	6	4
Q	(Spain) Axel Álvarez Llamas	7^{7}	2	6
WC	(France) Mick Lescure	2	5
11	(Belgium) Joris De Loore	6	7
15	(Australia) Luke Saville	6^{3}	7	4
(Japan) Kaichi Uchida	7^{7}	5	6
(Chile) Matías Sborowitz	6	4	6
(United States) Marcos Giron	4	6	8
WC	(France) Sébastien Boltz	0	0
Q	(Bulgaria) Dimitar Kuzmanov	6	6
Q	(Mexico) Luis Patiño	3	4
4	(United Kingdom) Oliver Golding	6	6

Second round
(Canada) F Peliwo	2	3
(United States) B Fratangelo	6	6
Q	(Spain) A Álvarez Llamas	4	6^{6}
11	(Belgium) J De Loore	6	7^{8}
(Japan) K Uchida	2	1
(United States) M Giron	6	6
Q	(Bulgaria) D Kuzmanov	4	6	2
4	(United Kingdom) O Golding	6	3	6

Third round
(United States) B Fratangelo	7^{7}	7^{10}
11	(Belgium) J De Loore	6^{1}	6^{8}
(United States) M Giron	3	6	2
4	(United Kingdom) O Golding	6	3	6

Quarterfinals
(United States) B Fratangelo	6	6
4	(United Kingdom) O Golding	1	1

==== Section 4 ====
First round
7	(Croatia) Mate Pavić	6^{4}	4
(Czech Republic) Lukáš Vrňák	7^{7}	6
(United States) Dennis Novikov	7^{7}	6
(France) Mathias Bourgue	6^{1}	3
(Germany) Robin Kern	6	6
(Romania) Teodor Nicolae Marin	3	1
(Spain) Andrés Artuñedo	4	6	6
12	(Austria) Patrick Ofner	6	2	4
13	(Brazil) Thiago Moura Monteiro	6	6^{11}	12
WC	(France) Laurent Lokoli	4	7^{13}	14
(Netherlands) Jannick Lupescu	6	4	2
(Australia) Ben Wagland	3	6	6
WC	(France) Tristan Lamasine	7^{9}	6
(Ecuador) Diego Hidalgo	6^{7}	4
(United States) Mac Styslinger	3	2
2	(Bolivia) Hugo Dellien	6	6

Second round
(Czech Republic) L Vrňák	3	6	6
(United States) D Novikov	6	4	4
(Germany) R Kern	6	6
(Spain) A Artuñedo	1	2
WC	(France) L Lokoli	6	6
(Australia) B Wagland	4	2
WC	(France) T Lamasine	2	6	6
2	(Bolivia) H Dellien	6	2	4

Third round
(Czech Republic) L Vrňák	6^{4}	0
(Germany) R Kern	7^{7}	6
WC	(France) L Lokoli	4	5
WC	(France) T Lamasine	6	7

Quarterfinals
(Germany) R Kern	4	6^{6}
WC	(France) T Lamasine	6	7^{8}
