= 2011 French Open – Wheelchair men's doubles =

Wheelchair men's doubles
- 2011 French Open

Final
- Champion: (Japan) Shingo Kunieda (France) Nicolas Peifer
- Runner-up: (Netherlands) Robin Ammerlaan (Sweden) Stefan Olsson
- Score: 6–2, 6–3

Events
Singles	men	women		boys	girls
Doubles	men	women	mixed	boys	girls
WC Singles	men	women	quad
WC Doubles	men	women	quad
Legends	−45	45+	women
- French Open

Defending champion Shingo Kunieda and his partner Nicolas Peifer defeated Robin Ammerlaan and Stefan Olsson in the final, 6–2, 6–3 to win the men's doubles wheelchair tennis title at the 2011 French Open.

Stéphane Houdet and Kunieda were the defending champions, but did not participate together. Houdet partnered Michaël Jérémiasz, but was defeated by Kunieda and Peifer in the semifinals.

== Seeds ==
1. (Japan) Shingo Kunieda / (France) Nicolas Peifer (champions)
2. (Netherlands) Maikel Scheffers / (Netherlands) Ronald Vink (semifinals)

== Draw ==
Key

- Q = Qualifier
- WC = Wild card
- LL = Lucky loser
- Alt = Alternate
- ITF = ITF entry
- PR = Protected ranking
- SR = Special ranking
- SE = Special exempt
- JE = Junior exempt
- JR = Junior Accelerator Programme entrant
- CO = College Accelerator Programme entrant
- NG = Next Gen Accelerator Program entrant
- w/o = Walkover
- r = Retired
- d = Defaulted

=== Finals ===
Semifinals
1	(Japan) Shingo Kunieda (France) Nicolas Peifer	1	6	[10]
(France) Stéphane Houdet (France) Michaël Jérémiasz	6	2	[7]
(Netherlands) Robin Ammerlaan (Sweden) Stefan Olsson	7	3	[11]
2	(Netherlands) Maikel Scheffers (Netherlands) Ronald Vink	5	6	[9]

Final
1	(Japan) Shingo Kunieda (France) Nicolas Peifer	6	6
(Netherlands) Robin Ammerlaan (Sweden) Stefan Olsson	2	3
