= 2011 French Open – Legends over 45 doubles =

Legends over 45 doubles
- 2011 French Open

Final
- Champions: (France) Guy Forget (France) Henri Leconte
- Runners-up: (Ecuador) Andrés Gómez (United States) John McEnroe
- Score: 6–3, 5–7, [10–8]

Events
| Singles | men | women | | boys | girls |
| Doubles | men | women | mixed | boys | girls |
| WC Singles | men | women | quad |
| WC Doubles | men | women | quad |
| Legends | −45 | 45+ | women |
| ← 2010 · | French Open | · 2012 → |

Andrés Gómez and John McEnroe were the defending champions. They reached the final where they were defeated by Guy Forget and Henri Leconte 6–3, 5–7, [10–8].

== Draw ==
=== Key ===
- Q = Qualifier
- WC = Wild card
- LL = Lucky loser
- Alt = Alternate
- ITF = ITF entry
- PR = Protected ranking
- SR = Special ranking
- SE = Special exempt
- JE = Junior exempt
- JR = Junior Accelerator Programme entrant
- CO = College Accelerator Programme entrant
- NG = Next Gen Accelerator Program entrant
- w/o = Walkover
- r = Retired
- d = Defaulted

=== Final ===
| Final |
| 1 | (France) Guy Forget (France) Henri Leconte | 6 | 5 | [10] |
| 2 | (Ecuador) Andrés Gómez (United States) John McEnroe | 3 | 7 | [8] |

=== Group A ===
| | (France) Forget (France) Leconte | (Romania) Năstase (Spain) Sánchez | (Iran) Bahrami (Australia) Woodforde | RR; W–L | Set; W–L | Game; W–L | Standings |
| (France) Guy Forget (France) Henri Leconte | | 6–3, 6–2 | 6–7^{(5–7)}, 6–2, [10–8] | 2–0 | 4–1 | 25–14 | 1 |
| (Romania) Ilie Năstase (Spain) Emilio Sánchez | 3–6, 2–6 | | 6–3, 7–5 | 1–1 | 2–2 | 18–20 | 2 |
| (Iran) Mansour Bahrami (Australia) Mark Woodforde | 7–6^{(7–5)}, 2–6, [8–10] | 3–6, 5–7 | | 0–2 | 1–4 | 17–26 | 3 |

Standings are determined by: 1. number of wins; 2. number of matches; 3. in three-players-ties, percentage of sets won, or of games won; 4. steering-committee decision.

=== Group B ===
| | (Ecuador) Gómez (United States) McEnroe | (Australia) Cash (Australia) McNamara | (Sweden) Pernfors (Sweden) Wilander | RR; W–L | Set; W–L | Game; W–L | Standings |
| (Ecuador) Andrés Gómez (United States) John McEnroe | | 6–1, 2–6, [10–8] | 7–6^{(7–5)}, 7–6^{(7–4)} | 2–0 | 4–1 | 23–19 | 1 |
| (Australia) Pat Cash (Australia) Peter McNamara | 1–6, 6–2, [8–10] | | 6–2, 6–3 | 1–1 | 3–2 | 19–14 | 2 |
| (Sweden) Mikael Pernfors (Sweden) Mats Wilander | 6–7^{(5–7)}, 6–7^{(4–7)} | 2–6, 3–6 | | 0–2 | 0–4 | 17–26 | 3 |

Standings are determined by: 1. number of wins; 2. number of matches; 3. in three-players-ties, percentage of sets won, or of games won; 4. steering-committee decision.
