= 2011 French Open – Women's legends doubles =

Women's legends doubles
- 2011 French Open

Final
- Champions: (United States) Lindsay Davenport (Switzerland) Martina Hingis
- Runners-up: (United States) Martina Navratilova (Czech Republic) Jana Novotná
- Score: 6–1, 6–2

Events
Singles	men	women		boys	girls
Doubles	men	women	mixed	boys	girls
WC Singles	men	women	quad
WC Doubles	men	women	quad
Legends	−45	45+	women
← 2010 ·	French Open	· 2012 →

Martina Navratilova and Jana Novotná, who were the defending champions, reached the final; however, Lindsay Davenport and Martina Hingis defeated them, 6–1, 6–2.

== Draw ==
Key

- Q = Qualifier
- WC = Wild card
- LL = Lucky loser
- Alt = Alternate
- ITF = ITF entry
- PR = Protected ranking
- SR = Special ranking
- SE = Special exempt
- JE = Junior exempt
- JR = Junior Accelerator Programme entrant
- CO = College Accelerator Programme entrant
- NG = Next Gen Accelerator Program entrant
- w/o = Walkover
- r = Retired
- d = Defaulted

=== Final ===
Final
1	(United States) Martina Navratilova (Czech Republic) Jana Novotná	1	2
2	(United States) Lindsay Davenport (Switzerland) Martina Hingis	6	6

=== Group A ===
	(United States) Navratilova (Czech Republic) Novotná	(Bulgaria) Maleeva (France) Tauziat	(Croatia) Majoli (Spain) Martínez	RR; W–L	Set; W–L	Game; W–L	Standings
(United States) Martina Navratilova (Czech Republic) Jana Novotná		6–2, 6–3	7–5, 6–1	2–0	4–0	25–11	1
(Bulgaria) Magdalena Maleeva (France) Nathalie Tauziat	2–6, 3–6		6–4, 6–2	1–1	2–2	17–18	2
(Croatia) Iva Majoli (Spain) Conchita Martínez	5–7, 1–6	4–6, 2–6		0–2	0–4	12–25	3

Standings are determined by: 1. number of wins; 2. number of matches; 3. in three-players-ties, percentage of sets won, or of games won; 4. steering-committee decision.

=== Group B ===
	(United States) Davenport (Switzerland) Hingis	(Hungary) Temesvári (France) Testud	(United States) Fernández (Belarus) Zvereva	RR; W–L	Set; W–L	Game; W–L	Standings
(United States) Lindsay Davenport (Switzerland) Martina Hingis		6–3, 6–7^{(4–7)}, [10–0]	6–1, 6–3	2–0	4–1	25–14	1
(Hungary) Andrea Temesvári (France) Sandrine Testud	3–6, 7–6^{(7–4)}, [0–10]		6–4, 6–3	1–1	3–2	22–20	2
(United States) Gigi Fernández (Belarus) Natasha Zvereva	1–6, 3–6	4–6, 3–6		0–2	0–4	11–24	3

Standings are determined by: 1. number of wins; 2. number of matches; 3. in three-players-ties, percentage of sets won, or of games won; 4. steering-committee decision.
