= 2011 French Open – Mixed doubles =

Mixed doubles
- 2011 French Open

Final
- Champions: (Australia) Casey Dellacqua (United States) Scott Lipsky
- Runners-up: (Slovenia) Katarina Srebotnik (Serbia) Nenad Zimonjić
- Score: 7–6^{(8–6)}, 4–6, [10–7]

Details
- Draw: 32
- Seeds: 8

Events
Singles	men	women		boys	girls
Doubles	men	women	mixed	boys	girls
WC Singles	men	women	quad
WC Doubles	men	women	quad
Legends	−45	45+	women
- French Open

Katarina Srebotnik and Nenad Zimonjić were the defending champions but lost to Casey Dellacqua and Scott Lipsky in the final 7–6^{(8–6)}, 4–6, [10–7]. This was the only major championship won by either Dellacqua or Lipsky in their careers.

== Seeds ==
1. (Slovenia) Katarina Srebotnik / (Serbia) Nenad Zimonjić (final)
2. (United States) Vania King / (Canada) Daniel Nestor (first round)
3. (Czech Republic) Květa Peschke / (Pakistan) Aisam-ul-Haq Qureshi (second round)
4. (Russia) Elena Vesnina / (Belarus) Max Mirnyi (second round)
5. (China) Zheng Jie / (India) Mahesh Bhupathi (second round)
6. (United States) Liezel Huber / (South Africa) Wesley Moodie (first round)
7. (Czech Republic) Iveta Benešová / (India) Leander Paes (quarterfinals)
8. (United States) Lisa Raymond / (Austria) Oliver Marach (first round)

== Draw ==
Key

- Q = Qualifier
- WC = Wild card
- LL = Lucky loser
- Alt = Alternate
- ITF = ITF entry
- PR = Protected ranking
- SR = Special ranking
- SE = Special exempt
- JE = Junior exempt
- JR = Junior Accelerator Programme entrant
- CO = College Accelerator Programme entrant
- NG = Next Gen Accelerator Program entrant
- w/o = Walkover
- r = Retired
- d = Defaulted

=== Finals ===
Semifinals
1	(Slovenia) Katarina Srebotnik (Serbia) Nenad Zimonjić	7^{7}	7^{7}
(Russia) Nadia Petrova (United Kingdom) Jamie Murray	6^{4}	6^{5}
(Australia) Jarmila Gajdošová (Brazil) Thomaz Bellucci	6^{5}	6	[12]
(Australia) Casey Dellacqua (United States) Scott Lipsky	7^{7}	2	[14]

Final
1	(Slovenia) Katarina Srebotnik (Serbia) Nenad Zimonjić	6^{6}	6	[7]
(Australia) Casey Dellacqua (United States) Scott Lipsky	7^{8}	4	[10]

=== Top half ===
First round
1	(Slovenia) K Srebotnik (Serbia) N Zimonjić	6	6
(Estonia) K Kanepi (Sweden) R Lindstedt	3	2
WC	(France) V Razzano (Belgium) D Norman	6	4	[10]
WC	(France) J Coin (France) N Mahut	4	6	[4]
(India) S Mirza (India) R Bopanna	6^{4}	6^{2}
(Chinese Taipei) C-j Chuang (Poland) M Matkowski	7^{7}	7^{7}
WC	(France) A Rezaï (Bulgaria) G Dimitrov	3	1
7	(Czech Republic) I Benešová (India) L Paes	6	6
4	(Russia) E Vesnina (Belarus) M Mirnyi	6	6	[10]
(Chinese Taipei) S-w Hsieh (Poland) M Fyrstenberg	7	4	[7]
(Russia) N Petrova (United Kingdom) J Murray	7^{7}	6
(United States) M Shaughnessy (Israel) A Ram	6^{1}	4
Alt	(Russia) A Kudryavtseva (Curaçao) J-J Rojer	3	5
(Spain) A Medina Garrigues (Spain) M López	6	7
(Russia) E Makarova (Brazil) B Soares	6	6
8	(United States) L Raymond (Austria) O Marach	2	3

Second round
1	(Slovenia) K Srebotnik (Serbia) N Zimonjić	6	6
WC	(France) V Razzano (Belgium) D Norman	3	1
(Chinese Taipei) C-j Chuang (Poland) M Matkowski	4	6^{1}
7	(Czech Republic) I Benešová (India) L Paes	6	7^{7}
4	(Russia) E Vesnina (Belarus) M Mirnyi	3	6	[11]
(Russia) N Petrova (United Kingdom) J Murray	6	4	[13]
(Spain) A Medina Garrigues (Spain) M López	6^{3}	2
(Russia) E Makarova (Brazil) B Soares	7^{7}	6

Quarterfinals
1	(Slovenia) K Srebotnik (Serbia) N Zimonjić	7^{7}	6
7	(Czech Republic) I Benešová (India) L Paes	6^{3}	3
(Russia) N Petrova (United Kingdom) J Murray	5	6	[10]
(Russia) E Makarova (Brazil) B Soares	7	3	[7]

Semifinals
1	(Slovenia) K Srebotnik (Serbia) N Zimonjić	7^{7}	7^{7}
(Russia) N Petrova (United Kingdom) J Murray	6^{4}	6^{5}

=== Bottom half ===
First round
5	(China) J Zheng (India) M Bhupathi	6^{6}	6	[10]
(Czech Republic) P Kvitová (Ukraine) S Stakhovsky	7^{8}	0	[8]
Alt	(Czech Republic) K Zakopalová (Czech Republic) F Čermák	4	3
(Australia) R Stubbs (Brazil) M Melo	6	6
(Australia) J Gajdošová (Brazil) T Bellucci	7	5	[10]
WC	(France) A Cornet (France) G Simon	5	7	[1]
Alt	(Romania) A Dulgheru (Spain) D Marrero	6^{4}	2
3	(Czech Republic) K Peschke (Pakistan) A-u-H Qureshi	7^{7}	6
6	(United States) L Huber (South Africa) W Moodie	6^{2}	6^{8}
(Czech Republic) V Uhlířová (Slovakia) M Mertiňák	7^{7}	7^{10}
(Czech Republic) B Záhlavová-Strýcová (Romania) H Tecău	6	7
(Italy) F Pennetta (Italy) P Starace	4	5
(Australia) A Rodionova (The Bahamas) M Knowles	6^{9}	5
(Australia) C Dellacqua (United States) S Lipsky	7^{11}	7
(Chinese Taipei) Y-j Chan (United States) E Butorac	3	6	[12]
2	(United States) V King (Canada) D Nestor	6	3	[10]

Second round
5	(China) J Zheng (India) M Bhupathi	6	3	[7]
(Australia) R Stubbs (Brazil) M Melo	4	6	[10]
(Australia) J Gajdošová (Brazil) T Bellucci	6	6
3	(Czech Republic) K Peschke (Pakistan) A-u-H Qureshi	4	4
(Czech Republic) V Uhlířová (Slovakia) M Mertiňák	6	6
(Czech Republic) B Záhlavová-Strýcová (Romania) H Tecău	3	2
(Australia) C Dellacqua (United States) S Lipsky	6	2	[10]
(Chinese Taipei) Y-j Chan (United States) E Butorac	3	6	[6]

Quarterfinals
(Australia) R Stubbs (Brazil) M Melo	6^{5}	4
(Australia) J Gajdošová (Brazil) T Bellucci	7^{7}	6
(Czech Republic) V Uhlířová (Slovakia) M Mertiňák	6^{4}	6^{6}
(Australia) C Dellacqua (United States) S Lipsky	7^{7}	7^{8}

Semifinals
(Australia) J Gajdošová (Brazil) T Bellucci	6^{5}	6	[12]
(Australia) C Dellacqua (United States) S Lipsky	7^{7}	2	[14]
