= 2011 French Open – Legends under 45 doubles =

Legends under 45 doubles
- 2011 French Open

Final
- Champions: (France) Fabrice Santoro (Australia) Todd Woodbridge
- Runners-up: (France) Arnaud Boetsch (France) Cédric Pioline
- Score: 6–2, 6–4

Events
Singles	men	women		boys	girls
Doubles	men	women	mixed	boys	girls
WC Singles	men	women	quad
WC Doubles	men	women	quad
Legends	−45	45+	women
← 2010 ·	French Open	· 2012 →

Yevgeny Kafelnikov and Andriy Medvedev were the defending champions, but they finished last in their group and were thus eliminated.
Fabrice Santoro and Todd Woodbridge won this event, defeating Arnaud Boetsch and Cédric Pioline 6–2, 6–4 in the final.

== Draw ==
=== Key ===
- Q = Qualifier
- WC = Wild card
- LL = Lucky loser
- Alt = Alternate
- ITF = ITF entry
- PR = Protected ranking
- SR = Special ranking
- SE = Special exempt
- JE = Junior exempt
- JR = Junior Accelerator Programme entrant
- CO = College Accelerator Programme entrant
- NG = Next Gen Accelerator Program entrant
- w/o = Walkover
- r = Retired
- d = Defaulted

=== Final ===
Final
1	(France) Fabrice Santoro (Australia) Todd Woodbridge	6	6
2	(France) Arnaud Boetsch (France) Cédric Pioline	2	4

=== Group A ===
	(France) Santoro (Australia) Woodbridge	(Croatia) Ivanišević (Germany) Stich	(Spain) Bruguera (Netherlands) Krajicek	RR; W–L	Set; W–L	Game; W–L	Standings
(France) Fabrice Santoro (Australia) Todd Woodbridge		7–6^{(7–4)}, 6–3	7–6^{(7–2)}, 6–3	2–0	4–0	26–18	1
(Croatia) Goran Ivanišević (Germany) Michael Stich	6–7^{(4–7)}, 3–6		5–7, 6–3, [11–9]	1–1	2–3	21–23	2
(Spain) Sergi Bruguera (Netherlands) Richard Krajicek	6–7^{(2–7)}, 3–6	7–5, 3–6, [9–11]		0–2	1–4	19–25	3

Standings are determined by: 1. number of wins; 2. number of matches; 3. in three-players-ties, percentage of sets won, or of games won; 4. steering-committee decision.

=== Group B ===
	(France) Boetsch (France) Pioline	(Sweden) Enqvist (Austria) Muster	(Russia) Kafelnikov (Ukraine) Medvedev	RR; W–L	Set; W–L	Game; W–L	Standings
(France) Arnaud Boetsch (France) Cédric Pioline		5–7, 6–3, [10–7]	4–6, 6–4, [8–10]	1–1	3–3	22–21	1
(Sweden) Thomas Enqvist (Austria) Thomas Muster	7–5, 3–6, [7–10]		6–3, 6–7^{(5–7)}, [10–7]	1–1	3–3	23–22	2
(Russia) Yevgeny Kafelnikov (Ukraine) Andriy Medvedev	6–4, 4–6, [10–8]	3–6, 7–6^{(7–5)}, [7–10]		1–1	3–3	21–23	3

Standings are determined by: 1. number of wins; 2. number of matches; 3. in three-players-ties, percentage of sets won, or of games won; 4. steering-committee decision.
