= 2008 Cachantún Cup – Singles =

Singles
- 2008 Cachantún Cup

Final
- Champion: (Italy) Flavia Pennetta
- Runner-up: (Czech Republic) Klára Zakopalová
- Score: 6–4, 5–4 retired

Events
| Singles | Doubles |
| ← 2007 · | Cachantún Cup | · 2009 → |

Flavia Pennetta won in the final 6–4, 5–4, after Klára Zakopalová retired due to a left ankle injury.

== Seeds ==
1. (Italy) Flavia Pennetta (champion)
2. (Argentina) Gisela Dulko (second round, withdrew due to a left hamstring injury)
3. (France) Émilie Loit (first round)
4. (France) Pauline Parmentier (semifinals)
5. (Germany) Martina Müller (quarterfinals)
6. (Italy) Sara Errani (second round)
7. (Estonia) Kaia Kanepi (quarterfinals)
8. (Czech Republic) Klára Zakopalová (final, retired due to a left ankle injury)

== Draw ==
=== Key ===
- Q = Qualifier
- WC = Wild card
- LL = Lucky loser
- Alt = Alternate
- SE = Special exempt
- PR = Protected ranking
- ITF = ITF entry
- JE = Junior exempt
- w/o = Walkover
- r = Retired
- d = Defaulted
- SR = Special ranking

=== Finals ===
Semifinals
1 | (Italy) Flavia Pennetta | 6 | 6
4 | (France) Pauline Parmentier | 2 | 0
(Ukraine) Mariya Koryttseva | 2 | 5
8 | (Czech Republic) Klára Zakopalová | 6 | 7

Final
1 | (Italy) Flavia Pennetta | 6 | 5
8 | (Czech Republic) Klára Zakopalová | 4 | 4^{r}

=== Top half ===
First round
1 | (Italy) F Pennetta | 6 | 6
(Hungary) G Arn | 2 | 2
Q | (Spain) MJ Martínez Sánchez | 6 | 3 | 4
(France) M Johansson | 0 | 6 | 6
(Italy) ME Camerin | 6 | 7
WC | (Chile) M Miranda | 3 | 5
(Russia) E Rodina | 3 | 4
7 | (Estonia) K Kanepi | 6 | 6
4 | (France) P Parmentier | 5 | 7 | 6
(Argentina) ME Salerni | 7 | 5 | 3
(Paraguay) R de los Ríos | 7 | 6
Q | (Spain) C Suárez Navarro | 6^{8} | 4
(Estonia) M Ani | 1 | 1
(Germany) J Schruff | 6 | 6
WC | (Chile) A Koch Benvenuto | 4 | 1
5 | (Germany) M Müller | 6 | 6

Second round
1 | (Italy) F Pennetta | 6 | 6
(France) M Johansson | 4 | 0
(Italy) ME Camerin | 6 | 3 | 4
7 | (Estonia) K Kanepi | 1 | 6 | 6
4 | (France) P Parmentier | 6^{0} | 6 | 6
(Paraguay) R de los Ríos | 7 | 1 | 1
(Germany) J Schruff | 3 | 2
5 | (Germany) M Müller | 6 | 6

Quarterfinals
1 | (Italy) F Pennetta | 6 | 6
7 | (Estonia) K Kanepi | 3 | 3
4 | (France) P Parmentier | 7 | 6
5 | (Germany) M Müller | 5 | 4

Semifinals
1 | (Italy) F Pennetta | 6 | 6
4 | (France) P Parmentier | 2 | 0

=== Bottom half ===
First round
6 | (Italy) S Errani | 1 | 6 | 6
Q | (France) O Sanchez | 6 | 2 | 1
(France) C Pin | 4 | 6^{5}
Q | (Spain) N Llagostera Vives | 6 | 7
(Colombia) C Castaño | 6^{3} | 1
(Ukraine) M Koryttseva | 7 | 6
(Czech Republic) P Cetkovská | 6 | 7
3 | (France) É Loit | 2 | 6^{6}
8 | (Czech Republic) K Zakopalová | 7 | 2 | 6
(Russia) E Bychkova | 6^{4} | 6 | 3
(United States) B Mattek | 6 | 6^{5} | 6^{3}
(Croatia) J Kostanić Tošić | 4 | 7 | 7
(Spain) L Domínguez Lino | 6 | 7
(Czech Republic) I Benešová | 2 | 5
WC | (Chile) C Silva | 4 | 1
2 | (Argentina) G Dulko | 6 | 6

Second round
6 | (Italy) S Errani | 2 | 0
Q | (Spain) N Llagostera Vives | 6 | 6
(Ukraine) M Koryttseva | 6 | 6
(Czech Republic) P Cetkovská | 3 | 4
8 | (Czech Republic) K Zakopalová | w/o
(Croatia) J Kostanić Tošić
(Spain) L Domínguez Lino | w/o
2 | (Argentina) G Dulko

Quarterfinals
Q | (Spain) N Llagostera Vives | 3 | 6^{4}
(Ukraine) M Koryttseva | 6 | 7
8 | (Czech Republic) K Zakopalová | 3 | 7 | 7
(Spain) L Domínguez Lino | 6 | 5 | 5

Semifinals
(Ukraine) M Koryttseva | 2 | 5
8 | (Czech Republic) K Zakopalová | 6 | 7

== Qualifying ==
=== Seeds ===
1. (Poland) Marta Domachowska (qualifying competition)
2. (France) Olivia Sanchez (qualified)
3. (Spain) Nuria Llagostera Vives (qualified)
4. (Argentina) Jorgelina Cravero (second round)
5. (Spain) Carla Suárez Navarro (qualified)
6. (Spain) María José Martínez Sánchez (qualified)
7. (Canada) Marie-Ève Pelletier (first round)
8. (Russia) Ekaterina Ivanova (second round)

=== Qualifiers ===
1. (Spain) María José Martínez Sánchez
2. (France) Olivia Sanchez
3. (Spain) Nuria Llagostera Vives
4. (Spain) Carla Suárez Navarro

=== Qualifying draw ===
==== First qualifier ====
First round
1 | (Poland) Marta Domachowska | 6 | 6
(Peru) Ingrid Várgas Calvo | 1 | 0
(Romania) Alexandra Dulgheru | 2 | 6 | 5
(Brazil) Maria Fernanda Alves | 6 | 3 | 7
(Spain) Arantxa Parra Santonja | 6 | 6
WC | (United States) Alexa Guarachi | 3 | 2
(Italy) Giulia Gabba | 4 | 2
6 | (Spain) María José Martínez Sánchez | 6 | 6

Second round
1 | (Poland) Marta Domachowska | 6 | 6
(Brazil) Maria Fernanda Alves | 3 | 2
(Spain) Arantxa Parra Santonja | 6 | 4 | 0
6 | (Spain) María José Martínez Sánchez | 4 | 6 | 6

Qualifying competition
1 | (Poland) Marta Domachowska | 2 | 5
6 | (Spain) María José Martínez Sánchez | 6 | 7

==== Second qualifier ====
First round
2 | (France) Olivia Sanchez | 6 | 6
WC | (Chile) María José Rodríguez Amenábar | 1 | 1
(Russia) Maria Kondratieva | 6 | 6
WC | (Chile) Camila Muñoz Quintanilla | 1 | 2
(Argentina) María Irigoyen | 6 | 6
(Colombia) Paula Zabala | 1 | 3
(Latvia) Līga Dekmeijere | 2 | 4
8 | (Russia) Ekaterina Ivanova | 6 | 6

Second round
2 | (France) Olivia Sanchez | 6 | 6
(Russia) Maria Kondratieva | 2 | 3
(Argentina) María Irigoyen | 6 | 6
8 | (Russia) Ekaterina Ivanova | 4 | 4

Qualifying competition
2 | (France) Olivia Sanchez | 6 | 6
(Argentina) María Irigoyen | 2 | 1

==== Third qualifier ====
First round
3 | (Spain) Nuria Llagostera Vives | 6 | 6
(Brazil) Ana Clara Duarte | 2 | 0
WC | (Chile) Paula Espinoza Peña | 0 | 0
(Argentina) Betina Jozami | 6 | 6
(Portugal) Frederica Piedade | 6 | 6
(France) Sophie Lefèvre | 4 | 2
WC | (Romania) Ágnes Szatmári | 7^{7} | 1 | 6
7 | (Canada) Marie-Ève Pelletier | 6^{3} | 6 | 4

Second round
3 | (Spain) Nuria Llagostera Vives | 4 | 6 | 7
(Argentina) Betina Jozami | 6 | 0 | 5
(Portugal) Frederica Piedade | 1 | 4
WC | (Romania) Ágnes Szatmári | 6 | 6

Qualifying competition
3 | (Spain) Nuria Llagostera Vives | 6 | 6
WC | (Romania) Ágnes Szatmári | 1 | 1

==== Fourth qualifier ====
First round
4 | (Argentina) Jorgelina Cravero | 6 | 6
WC | (Bulgaria) Aleksandrina Naydenova | 2 | 0
(Spain) Marta Marrero | 7 | 4 | 7^{7}
(Argentina) Agustina Lepore | 5 | 6 | 6^{4}
(United States) Kit Carson | 1 | 0
(Argentina) Florencia Molinero | 6 | 6
WC | (Poland) Alicja Rosolska | 1 | 2
5 | (Spain) Carla Suárez Navarro | 6 | 6

Second round
4 | (Argentina) Jorgelina Cravero | 1 | 1
(Spain) Marta Marrero | 6 | 6
(Argentina) Florencia Molinero | 1 | 2
5 | (Spain) Carla Suárez Navarro | 6 | 6

Qualifying competition
(Spain) Marta Marrero | 1 | 2
5 | (Spain) Carla Suárez Navarro | 6 | 6
