= 2008 Cachantún Cup – Doubles =

Doubles
- 2008 Cachantún Cup

Final
- Champions: (Latvia) Līga Dekmeijere (Poland) Alicja Rosolska
- Runners-up: (Ukraine) Mariya Koryttseva (Germany) Julia Schruff
- Score: 7–5, 6–3

Events
Singles	Doubles
← 2007 ·	Cachantún Cup	· 2009 →

Līga Dekmeijere and Alicja Rosolska won the final 7–5, 6–3 against Mariya Koryttseva and Julia Schruff.

== Seeds ==
1. (Argentina) Gisela Dulko / (Italy) Flavia Pennetta (withdrew due to a left hamstring injury for Dulko)
2. (Czech Republic) Iveta Benešová / (United States) Bethanie Mattek (quarterfinals)
3. (Croatia) Jelena Kostanić Tošić / (Germany) Martina Müller (quarterfinals, withdrew due to a neck injury for Kostanic Tosic)
4. (Colombia) Catalina Castaño / (Spain) Arantxa Parra Santonja (first round)

== Draw ==
=== Key ===
- Q = Qualifier
- WC = Wild card
- LL = Lucky loser
- Alt = Alternate
- SE = Special exempt
- PR = Protected ranking
- ITF = ITF entry
- JE = Junior exempt
- w/o = Walkover
- r = Retired
- d = Defaulted
- SR = Special ranking

=== Draw ===
First round
ALT	(Brazil) MF Alves (Canada) M-È Pelletier	7	6
(United States) C Fusano (United States) R Kops-Jones	5	4
(Spain) N Llagostera Vives (Spain) MJ Martínez Sánchez	6	6
(France) S Lefèvre (Romania) A Szatmári	0	2
3	(Croatia) J Kostanić Tošić (Germany) M Müller	6	1	[10]
(Italy) ME Camerin (Italy) S Errani	4	6	[7]
(Ukraine) M Koryttseva (Germany) J Schruff	1	6	[11]
(Estonia) M Ani (Czech Republic) P Cetkovská	6	4	[9]
(Spain) M Marrero (Spain) C Suárez Navarro	0	7	[7]
(France) C Pin (Argentina) ME Salerni	6	5	[10]
(Poland) K Jans (Turkey) İ Şenoğlu	7	6^{5}	[10]
4	(Colombia) C Castaño (Spain) A Parra Santonja	6^{5}	7	[6]
(Argentina) J Cravero (Argentina) B Jozami	3	5
(Latvia) L Dekmeijere (Poland) A Rosolska	6	7
WC	(Argentina) M Irigoyen (Chile) A Koch Benvenuto	4	2
2	(Czech Republic) I Benešová (United States) B Mattek	6	6

Quarterfinals
ALT	(Brazil) MF Alves (Canada) M-È Pelletier	6	6
(Spain) N Llagostera Vives (Spain) MJ Martínez Sánchez	2	2
3	(Croatia) J Kostanić Tošić (Germany) M Müller
(Ukraine) M Koryttseva (Germany) J Schruff	w/o
(France) C Pin (Argentina) ME Salerni	4	2
(Poland) K Jans (Turkey) İ Şenoğlu	6	6
(Latvia) L Dekmeijere (Poland) A Rosolska	7	7
2	(Czech Republic) I Benešová (United States) B Mattek	6^{2}	6^{5}

Semifinals
ALT	(Brazil) MF Alves (Canada) M-È Pelletier	7	4	[7]
(Ukraine) M Koryttseva (Germany) J Schruff	6^{1}	6	[10]
(Poland) K Jans (Turkey) İ Şenoğlu	3	6	[6]
(Latvia) L Dekmeijere (Poland) A Rosolska	6	1	[10]

Final
(Ukraine) M Koryttseva (Germany) J Schruff	5	3
(Latvia) L Dekmeijere (Poland) A Rosolska	7	6
