= 2008 Cachantún Cup =

- Date: 11–17 February 2008
- Edition: 1st
- Category: Tier III Series
- Surface: Clay / Outdoor
- Location: Viña del Mar, Chile

Champions

Singles
- (Italy) Flavia Pennetta

Doubles
- (Latvia) Līga Dekmeijere / (Poland) Alicja Rosolska
Cachantún Cup

The 2008 Cachantún Cup was a women's tennis tournament played on outdoor clay courts. It was the first and only edition of the Cachantún Cup, and was part of the Tier III Series of the 2008 WTA Tour. It took place in Viña del Mar, Chile, on 11–17 February 2008. Flavia Pennetta won the singles title.

== Champions ==
=== Singles ===
(Italy) Flavia Pennetta defeated (Czech Republic) Klára Zakopalová, 6–4, 5–4 retired

- It was Flavia Pennetta's first title of the year, and her fifth overall.

=== Doubles ===
(Latvia) Līga Dekmeijere / (Poland) Alicja Rosolska defeated (Ukraine) Mariya Koryttseva / (Germany) Julia Schruff, 7–5, 6–3
