= 2011 French Open – Women's doubles =

Sports tournament

Women's doubles
- 2011 French Open

Final
- Champion: (Czech Republic) Andrea Hlaváčková (Czech Republic) Lucie Hradecká
- Runner-up: (India) Sania Mirza (Russia) Elena Vesnina
- Score: 6–4, 6–3

Details
- Draw: 64 (7 WC )
- Seeds: 16

Events
Singles	men	women		boys	girls
Doubles	men	women	mixed	boys	girls
WC Singles	men	women	quad
WC Doubles	men	women	quad
Legends	−45	45+	women
← 2010 ·	French Open	· 2012 →

Serena Williams and Venus Williams were the defending champions, but both withdrew from the tournament with a pulmonary embolism and a hip injury, respectively.

Andrea Hlaváčková and Lucie Hradecká won the title, defeating Sania Mirza and Elena Vesnina in the final 6–4, 6–3.

== Seeds ==
1. (Argentina) Gisela Dulko / (Italy) Flavia Pennetta (quarterfinals)
2. (Czech Republic) Květa Peschke / (Slovenia) Katarina Srebotnik (quarterfinals)
3. (United States) Vania King / (Kazakhstan) Yaroslava Shvedova (semifinals)
4. (United States) Liezel Huber / (United States) Lisa Raymond (semifinals)
5. (Belarus) Victoria Azarenka / (Russia) Maria Kirilenko (quarterfinals)
6. (United States) Bethanie Mattek-Sands / (United States) Meghann Shaughnessy (second round)
7. (India) Sania Mirza / (Russia) Elena Vesnina (final)
8. (Czech Republic) Iveta Benešová / (Czech Republic) Barbora Záhlavová-Strýcová (first round)
9. (Russia) Nadia Petrova / (Australia) Anastasia Rodionova (quarterfinals)
10. (China) Peng Shuai / (China) Zheng Jie (second round)
11. (Spain) María José Martínez Sánchez / (Spain) Anabel Medina Garrigues (third round)
12. (Slovakia) Daniela Hantuchová / (Poland) Agnieszka Radwańska (first round)
13. (Chinese Taipei) Chan Yung-jan / (Romania) Monica Niculescu (third round)
14. (Chinese Taipei) Chuang Chia-jung / (Belarus) Olga Govortsova (first round)
15. (Italy) Sara Errani / (Italy) Roberta Vinci (third round)
16. (South Africa) Natalie Grandin / (Czech Republic) Vladimíra Uhlířová (third round)

== Draw ==
=== Key ===
- Q = Qualifier
- WC = Wild card
- LL = Lucky loser
- Alt = Alternate
- ITF = ITF entry
- PR = Protected ranking
- SR = Special ranking
- SE = Special exempt
- JE = Junior exempt
- JR = Junior Accelerator Programme entrant
- CO = College Accelerator Programme entrant
- NG = Next Gen Accelerator Program entrant
- w/o = Walkover
- r = Retired
- d = Defaulted

=== Finals ===
Quarterfinals
1	(Argentina) Gisela Dulko (Italy) Flavia Pennetta	0	5
7	(India) Sania Mirza (Russia) Elena Vesnina	6	7
4	(United States) Liezel Huber (United States) Lisa Raymond	6	4	6
5	(Belarus) Victoria Azarenka (Russia) Maria Kirilenko	4	6	4
9	(Russia) Nadia Petrova (Australia) Anastasia Rodionova	5	6	2
3	(United States) Vania King (Kazakhstan) Yaroslava Shvedova	7	3	6
(Czech Republic) Andrea Hlaváčková (Czech Republic) Lucie Hradecká	6	7
2	(Czech Republic) Květa Peschke (Slovenia) Katarina Srebotnik	3	5

Semifinals
7	(India) Sania Mirza (Russia) Elena Vesnina	6	2	6
4	(United States) Liezel Huber (United States) Lisa Raymond	3	6	4
3	(United States) Vania King (Kazakhstan) Yaroslava Shvedova	3	3
(Czech Republic) Andrea Hlaváčková (Czech Republic) Lucie Hradecká	6	6

Final
7	(India) Sania Mirza (Russia) Elena Vesnina	4	3
(Czech Republic) Andrea Hlaváčková (Czech Republic) Lucie Hradecká	6	6

=== Top half ===
==== Section 1 ====
First round
1	(Argentina) G Dulko (Italy) F Pennetta	3	6	6
(Chinese Taipei) S-w Hsieh (United States) C Vandeweghe	6	1	0
(Greece) E Daniilidou (Croatia) D Jurak	3	3
(Germany) A-L Grönefeld (Switzerland) P Schnyder	6	6
Alt	(Austria) S Klemenschits (Italy) R Oprandi	6	6	1
(Croatia) M Lučić (France) A Rezaï	7	4	6
(Romania) E Gallovits-Hall (Germany) A Kerber	4	4
15	(Italy) S Errani (Italy) R Vinci	6	6
11	(Spain) MJ Martínez Sánchez (Spain) A Medina Garrigues	6	6
(Hungary) G Arn (United States) J Craybas	0	2
(Serbia) B Jovanovski (United States) V Lepchenko	2	1
(Spain) L Domínguez Lino (Spain) L Pous Tió	6	6
(Germany) K Barrois (Sweden) J Larsson	6	3	6
(United States) R Kops-Jones (United States) A Spears	1	6	1
(Russia) V Dushevina (Russia) E Makarova	6^{2}	2
7	(India) S Mirza (Russia) E Vesnina	7^{7}	6

Second round
1	(Argentina) G Dulko (Italy) F Pennetta	6	7
(Germany) A-L Grönefeld (Switzerland) P Schnyder	2	5
(Croatia) M Lučić (France) A Rezaï	0	0
15	(Italy) S Errani (Italy) R Vinci	6	6
11	(Spain) MJ Martínez Sánchez (Spain) A Medina Garrigues	6	6
(Spain) L Domínguez Lino (Spain) L Pous Tió	2	4
(Germany) K Barrois (Sweden) J Larsson	6^{4}	3
7	(India) S Mirza (Russia) E Vesnina	7^{7}	6

Third round
1	(Argentina) G Dulko (Italy) F Pennetta	6	6
15	(Italy) S Errani (Italy) R Vinci	4	2
11	(Spain) MJ Martínez Sánchez (Spain) A Medina Garrigues	1	4
7	(India) S Mirza (Russia) E Vesnina	6	6

Quarterfinals
1	(Argentina) G Dulko (Italy) F Pennetta	0	5
7	(India) S Mirza (Russia) E Vesnina	6	7

==== Section 2 ====
First round
4	(United States) L Huber (United States) L Raymond	6	6
(Ukraine) A Bondarenko (Ukraine) K Bondarenko	3	3
WC	(France) C Garcia (France) A Védy	6	3	5
(Sweden) S Arvidsson (Estonia) K Kanepi	2	6	7
(Japan) K Date-Krumm (China) S Zhang	7	6
(Ukraine) O Savchuk (Latvia) A Sevastova	5	4
(Australia) C Dellacqua (Australia) R Stubbs	6	6
14	(Chinese Taipei) C-j Chuang (Belarus) O Govortsova	4	0
12	(Slovakia) D Hantuchová (Poland) A Radwańska	7^{7}	3	2
(Netherlands) M Krajicek (Czech Republic) L Šafářová	6^{5}	6	6
(Russia) M Kondratieva (France) S Lefèvre	3	4
WC	(France) K Mladenovic (France) P Parmentier	6	6
(Czech Republic) R Voráčová (Kazakhstan) G Voskoboeva	6	6
(Austria) T Paszek (Bulgaria) T Pironkova	2	2
(Russia) A Panova (Belarus) T Poutchek	2	1
5	(Belarus) V Azarenka (Russia) M Kirilenko	6	6

Second round
4	(United States) L Huber (United States) L Raymond	6	7
(Sweden) S Arvidsson (Estonia) K Kanepi	2	5
(Japan) K Date-Krumm (China) S Zhang	1	6^{4}
(Australia) C Dellacqua (Australia) R Stubbs	6	7^{7}
(Netherlands) M Krajicek (Czech Republic) L Šafářová	2	7^{7}	6
WC	(France) K Mladenovic (France) P Parmentier	6	6^{3}	0
(Czech Republic) R Voráčová (Kazakhstan) G Voskoboeva	5	1
5	(Belarus) V Azarenka (Russia) M Kirilenko	7	6

Third round
4	(United States) L Huber (United States) L Raymond	6	6
(Australia) C Dellacqua (Australia) R Stubbs	3	2
(Netherlands) M Krajicek (Czech Republic) L Šafářová	5	3
5	(Belarus) V Azarenka (Russia) M Kirilenko	7	6

Quarterfinals
4	(United States) L Huber (United States) L Raymond	6	4	6
5	(Belarus) V Azarenka (Russia) M Kirilenko	4	6	4

=== Bottom half ===
==== Section 3 ====
First round
6	(United States) B Mattek-Sands (United States) M Shaughnessy	6	6
WC	(France) V Larrière (France) A Lim	2	1
(Germany) J Görges (Germany) A Petkovic	6	6
(Uzbekistan) A Amanmuradova (Belarus) D Kustova	4	3
WC	(France) A Bergot (France) I Brémond	0	1
(Spain) N Llagostera Vives (Spain) A Parra Santonja	6	6
(Italy) A Brianti (Croatia) P Martić	5	1
9	(Russia) N Petrova (Australia) A Rodionova	7	6
13	(Chinese Taipei) Y-j Chan (Romania) M Niculescu	2	6	6
WC	(France) C Feuerstein (France) S Foretz Gacon	6	4	1
(Romania) S Halep (Slovenia) P Hercog	6	3	4
(Australia) J Gajdošová (Czech Republic) K Zakopalová	4	6	6
(Russia) S Kuznetsova (Russia) V Zvonareva	6	6
(Poland) K Jans (Poland) A Rosolska	4	4
(Russia) V Diatchenko (Ukraine) M Koryttseva	3	1
3	(United States) V King (Kazakhstan) Y Shvedova	6	6

Second round
6	(United States) B Mattek-Sands (United States) M Shaughnessy	1	6	6^{6}
(Germany) J Görges (Germany) A Petkovic	6	1	7^{8}
(Spain) N Llagostera Vives (Spain) A Parra Santonja	6	3	3
9	(Russia) N Petrova (Australia) A Rodionova	3	6	6
13	(Chinese Taipei) Y-j Chan (Romania) M Niculescu	6	7
(Australia) J Gajdošová (Czech Republic) K Zakopalová	0	5
(Russia) S Kuznetsova (Russia) V Zvonareva	3	6	3
3	(United States) V King (Kazakhstan) Y Shvedova	6	1	6

Third round
(Germany) J Görges (Germany) A Petkovic	3	4
9	(Russia) N Petrova (Australia) A Rodionova	6	6
13	(Chinese Taipei) Y-j Chan (Romania) M Niculescu	6	3	4
3	(United States) V King (Kazakhstan) Y Shvedova	2	6	6

Quarterfinals
9	(Russia) N Petrova (Australia) A Rodionova	5	6	2
3	(United States) V King (Kazakhstan) Y Shvedova	7	3	6

==== Section 4 ====
First round
8	(Czech Republic) I Benešová (Czech Republic) B Záhlavová-Strýcová	4	1
(Czech Republic) A Hlaváčková (Czech Republic) L Hradecká	6	6
(Romania) S Cîrstea (Japan) A Morita	6^{5}	6	3
(Russia) A Kudryavtseva (Germany) J Wöhr	7^{7}	2	6
(Australia) J Dokić (United States) M Oudin	2	6	2
(Romania) A Dulgheru (Slovakia) M Rybáriková	6	4	6
WC	(France) J Coin (France) M Johansson	1	1
10	(China) S Peng (China) J Zheng	6	6
16	(South Africa) N Grandin (Czech Republic) V Uhlířová	6	6
(Canada) R Marino (Turkey) İ Şenoğlu	3	2
(France) A Cornet (France) V Razzano	1	4
(Serbia) J Janković (Russia) A Pavlyuchenkova	6	6
WC	(France) I Pavlovic (France) L Thorpe	6^{3}	6	3
(Latvia) L Dekmeijere (Hungary) A Szávay	7^{7}	3	6
(Chinese Taipei) K-c Chang (South Africa) C Scheepers	2	2
2	(Czech Republic) K Peschke (Slovenia) K Srebotnik	6	6

Second round
(Czech Republic) A Hlaváčková (Czech Republic) L Hradecká	6	6
(Russia) A Kudryavtseva (Germany) J Wöhr	3	1
(Romania) A Dulgheru (Slovakia) M Rybáriková	3	6	6
10	(China) S Peng (China) J Zheng	6	3	1
16	(South Africa) N Grandin (Czech Republic) V Uhlířová	6	3	6
(Serbia) J Janković (Russia) A Pavlyuchenkova	3	6	3
(Latvia) L Dekmeijere (Hungary) A Szávay	1^{r}
2	(Czech Republic) K Peschke (Slovenia) K Srebotnik	2

Third round
(Czech Republic) A Hlaváčková (Czech Republic) L Hradecká	7^{7}	6
(Romania) A Dulgheru (Slovakia) M Rybáriková	6^{1}	4
16	(South Africa) N Grandin (Czech Republic) V Uhlířová	1	3
2	(Czech Republic) K Peschke (Slovenia) K Srebotnik	6	6

Quarterfinals
(Czech Republic) A Hlaváčková (Czech Republic) L Hradecká	6	7
2	(Czech Republic) K Peschke (Slovenia) K Srebotnik	3	5
