= 2011 Poli-Farbe Budapest Grand Prix – Doubles =

Doubles
- 2011 Poli-Farbe Budapest Grand Prix

Final
- Champions: (Spain) Anabel Medina Garrigues (Poland) Alicja Rosolska
- Runners-up: (South Africa) Natalie Grandin (Czech Republic) Vladimíra Uhlířová
- Score: 6–2, 6–2

Details
- Draw: 16
- Seeds: 4

Events
Singles	Doubles
← 2010 ·	Poli-Farbe Budapest Grand Prix	· 2012 →

Timea Bacsinszky and Tathiana Garbin were the defending champions but decided not to participate.

Anabel Medina Garrigues and Alicja Rosolska won the tournament beating Natalie Grandin and Vladimíra Uhlířová in the final, 6–2, 6–2.

== Seeds ==
1. (Spain) Anabel Medina Garrigues / (Poland) Alicja Rosolska (champions)
2. (South Africa) Natalie Grandin / (Czech Republic) Vladimíra Uhlířová (final)
3. (Czech Republic) Eva Birnerová / (Czech Republic) Lucie Hradecká (quarterfinals)
4. (Slovenia) Andreja Klepač / (Belarus) Tatiana Poutchek (semifinals)

== Draw ==
=== Key ===
- Q = Qualifier
- WC = Wild card
- LL = Lucky loser
- Alt = Alternate
- SE = Special exempt
- PR = Protected ranking
- ITF = ITF entry
- JE = Junior exempt
- w/o = Walkover
- r = Retired
- d = Defaulted
- SR = Special ranking

=== Draw ===
First round
1	(Spain) A Medina Garrigues (Poland) A Rosolska	4	6	[10]
WC	(Hungary) T Babos (Hungary) K Marosi	6	1	[8]
(Russia) M Kondratieva (Russia) E Rodina	1	6	[6]
(Serbia) T Mirčić (Spain) L Pous Tió	6	1	[10]
3	(Czech Republic) E Birnerová (Czech Republic) L Hradecká	6	6
WC	(Bulgaria) D Evtimova (Switzerland) V Golubic	2	4
(Croatia) P Martić (Ukraine) O Savchuk	4	6	[10]
(Austria) S Klemenschits (Ukraine) L Tsurenko	6	1	[7]
(Ukraine) A Bondarenko (Ukraine) K Bondarenko	7	2	[8]
(China) X Han (Chinese Taipei) S-w Hsieh	5	6	[10]
(Russia) A Pivovarova (France) A Védy	4	1
4	(Slovenia) A Klepač (Belarus) T Poutchek	6	6
(Australia) D Dominikovic (France) S Lefèvre	4	3
(Ukraine) M Koryttseva (Romania) IR Olaru	6	6
(Romania) I-C Begu (Australia) J Moore	2	4
2	(South Africa) N Grandin (Czech Republic) V Uhlířová	6	6

Quarterfinals
1	(Spain) A Medina Garrigues (Poland) A Rosolska	6	6
(Serbia) T Mirčić (Spain) L Pous Tió	4	1
3	(Czech Republic) E Birnerová (Czech Republic) L Hradecká	5	2
(Croatia) P Martić (Ukraine) O Savchuk	7	6
(China) X Han (Chinese Taipei) S-w Hsieh	2	6	[5]
4	(Slovenia) A Klepač (Belarus) T Poutchek	6	4	[10]
(Ukraine) M Koryttseva (Romania) IR Olaru	2	5
2	(South Africa) N Grandin (Czech Republic) V Uhlířová	6	7

Semifinals
1	(Spain) A Medina Garrigues (Poland) A Rosolska	6	7
(Croatia) P Martić (Ukraine) O Savchuk	2	6^{4}
4	(Slovenia) A Klepač (Belarus) T Poutchek	2	1
2	(South Africa) N Grandin (Czech Republic) V Uhlířová	6	6

Final
1	(Spain) A Medina Garrigues (Poland) A Rosolska	6	6
2	(South Africa) N Grandin (Czech Republic) V Uhlířová	2	2
