= Internazionali di Tenis Femminili Città di Latina =

ITF Women's Tour
- Event name: Latina
- Location: Latina, Italy
- Category: ITF Women's Circuit
- Surface: Clay
- Draw: 32S/32Q/16D
- Prize money: $50,000

The Internazionali di Tenis Femminili Città di Latina was a tournament for professional female tennis players played on outdoor clay courts. The event was classified as a $50,000 ITF Women's Circuit tournament and was held in Latina, Italy, in 2003 and from 2007 to 2009.

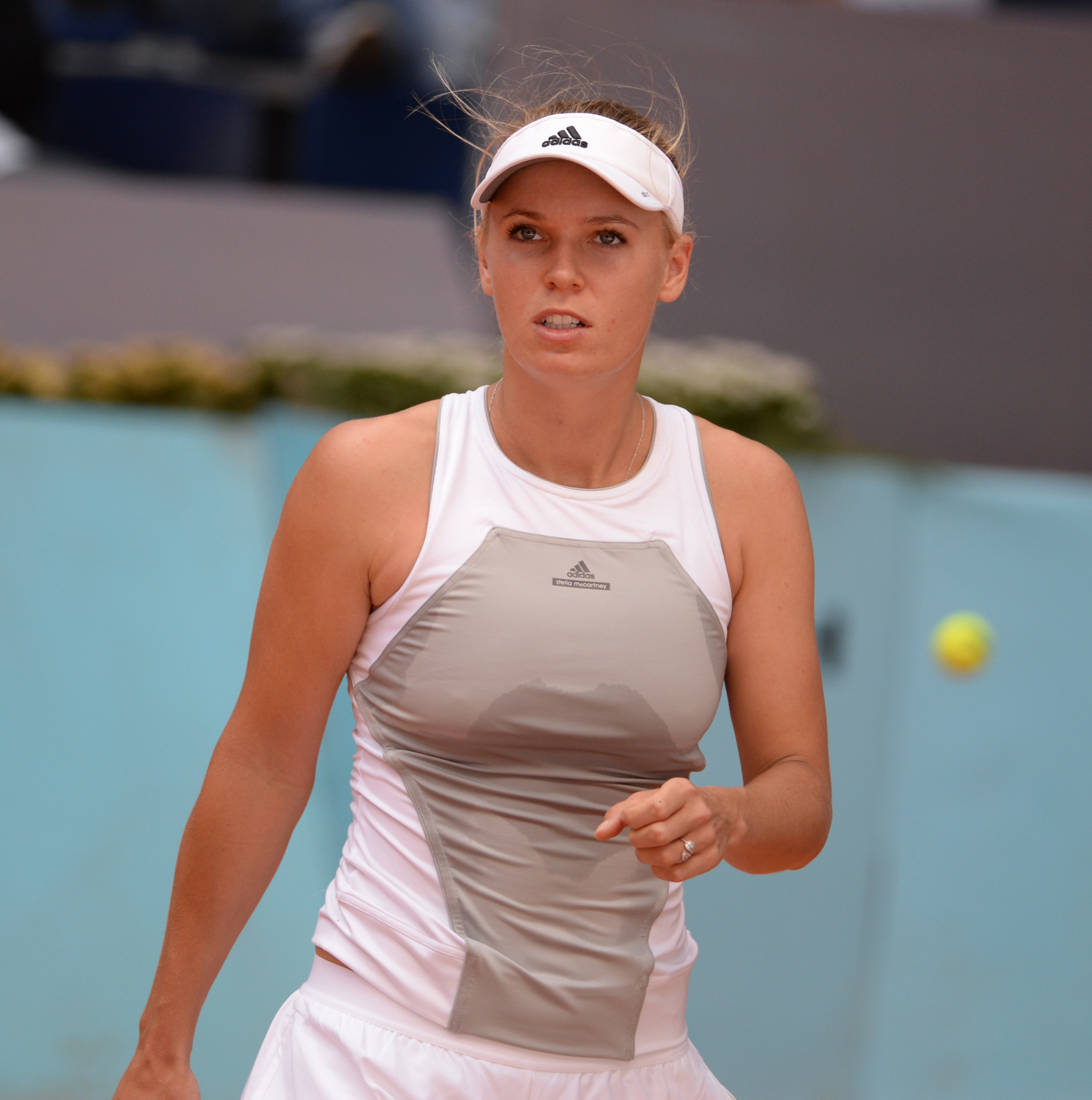
Caroline Wozniacki, who was the runner-up in 2007, would later become the WTA's world number one in the future

== Past finals ==
=== Singles ===
Year	Champion	Runner-up	Score
2009	(Germany) Julia Schruff	(Germany) Andrea Petkovic	7–5, 7–6^{(7–0)}
2008	(Czech Republic) Iveta Benešová	(Bulgaria) Sesil Karatantcheva	6–0, 6–2
2007	(Austria) Yvonne Meusburger	(Denmark) Caroline Wozniacki	7–5, 4–6, 6–3
2006–04	Not held		
2003	(Italy) Roberta Vinci	(Russia) Galina Voskoboeva	6–3, 6–4

=== Doubles ===
Year	Champions	Runners-up	Score
2009	(Italy) Alberta Brianti (Germany) Julia Schruff	(Russia) Marina Shamayko (Italy) Emily Stellato	6–1, 6–4
2008	(Italy) Elisa Balsamo (Italy) Valentina Sulpizio	(Bosnia and Herzegovina) Sandra Martinović (Germany) Kathrin Wörle	0–6, 7–6^{(8–6)}, [10–7]
2007	(Italy) Sara Errani (Italy) Giulia Gabba	(France) Stéphanie Cohen-Aloro (Tunisia) Selima Sfar	6–3, 1–6, 7–6^{(7–2)}
2006–04	Not held		
2003	(Italy) Mara Santangelo (Italy) Roberta Vinci	(Estonia) Maret Ani (Czech Republic) Libuše Průšová	3–6, 6–2, 6–4
