= 2011 Poli-Farbe Budapest Grand Prix =

- Date: 2–10 July
- Edition: 16th
- Category: WTA International
- Draw: 32S / 16D
- Prize money: $220,000
- Surface: Clay / outdoor
- Location: Budapest, Hungary

Champions

Singles
- (Italy) Roberta Vinci

Doubles
- (Spain) Anabel Medina Garrigues / (Poland) Alicja Rosolska
- Budapest Grand Prix

The 2011 Poli-Farbe Budapest Grand Prix was a women's tennis tournament played on outdoor clay courts. It was the 16th edition of the Budapest Grand Prix, an International-level tournament on the 2011 WTA Tour. It took place in Budapest, Hungary, from 2 July through 10 July 2011. First-seeded Roberta Vinci won the singles title.

== Finals ==
=== Singles ===
(Italy) Roberta Vinci defeated (Romania) Irina-Camelia Begu 6–4, 1–6, 6–4

- It was Vinci's 3rd title of the year and 6th of her career.

=== Doubles ===
(Spain) Anabel Medina Garrigues / (Poland) Alicja Rosolska defeated (South Africa) Natalie Grandin / (Czech Republic) Vladimíra Uhlířová,6–2, 6–2

== Entrants ==
=== Entry list ===
Country	Player	Rank^{1}	Seed
ITA	Roberta Vinci	29	1
ITA	Sara Errani	34	2
CZE	Klára Zakopalová	35	3
CZE	Lucie Hradecká	41	4
ESP	Anabel Medina Garrigues	43	5
FRA	Mathilde Johansson	70	6
ROU	Irina-Camelia Begu	78	7
RUS	Evgeniya Rodina	82	8

- ^{1} Rankings are as of June 20, 2011.

=== Other entrants ===
The following players received wildcards into the singles main draw

- (Hungary) Tímea Babos
- (Hungary) Vanda Lukács
- (Hungary) Katalin Marosi

The following players received entry from the qualifying draw:

- (Spain) Estrella Cabeza Candela
- (Hungary) Réka-Luca Jani
- (Slovakia) Lenka Juríková
- (Serbia) Aleksandra Krunić

The following player received entry from a lucky loser spot:

- (Italy) Anna-Giulia Remondina
