= 2011 Poli-Farbe Budapest Grand Prix – Singles =

Singles
- 2011 Poli-Farbe Budapest Grand Prix

Final
- Champion: (Italy) Roberta Vinci
- Runner-up: (Romania) Irina-Camelia Begu
- Score: 6–4, 1–6, 6–4

Details
- Draw: 32
- Seeds: 8

Events
Singles	Doubles
← 2010 ·	Poli-Farbe Budapest Grand Prix	· 2012 →

Ágnes Szávay was the defending champion but decided not to participate.

First-seeded Roberta Vinci won the tournament, defeating 7th seed Irina-Camelia Begu in the final, 6–4, 1–6, 6–4.

== Seeds ==
1. (Italy) Roberta Vinci (champion)
2. (Italy) Sara Errani (quarterfinals, retired)
3. (Czech Republic) Klára Zakopalová (semifinals)
4. (Czech Republic) Lucie Hradecká (first round)
5. (Spain) Anabel Medina Garrigues (semifinals)
6. (France) Mathilde Johansson (first round)
7. (Romania) Irina-Camelia Begu (final)
8. (Russia) Evgeniya Rodina (first round)

== Draw ==
=== Key ===
- Q = Qualifier
- WC = Wild card
- LL = Lucky loser
- Alt = Alternate
- SE = Special exempt
- PR = Protected ranking
- ITF = ITF entry
- JE = Junior exempt
- w/o = Walkover
- r = Retired
- d = Defaulted
- SR = Special ranking

=== Finals ===
Semifinals
1	(Italy) Roberta Vinci	6	6
3	(Czech Republic) Klára Zakopalová	4	4
7	(Romania) Irina-Camelia Begu	6	6
5	(Spain) Anabel Medina Garrigues	4	4

Final
1	(Italy) Roberta Vinci	6	1	6
7	(Romania) Irina-Camelia Begu	4	6	4

=== Top half ===
First round
1	(Italy) R Vinci	6	6
Q	(Slovakia) L Juríková	1	0
LL	(Italy) A-G Remondina	3	6^{4}
WC	(Hungary) T Babos	6	7^{7}
(Ukraine) A Bondarenko	6	6
(Czech Republic) S Záhlavová	0	1
(Slovakia) Z Kučová	7^{7}	7
6	(France) M Johansson	6^{2}	5
3	(Czech Republic) K Zakopalová	6	6
(China) X Han	0	2
(Russia) N Bratchikova	5	0^{r}
Q	(Serbia) A Krunić	7	1
WC	(Hungary) K Marosi	3	4
(Ukraine) K Bondarenko	6	6
(Ukraine) O Savchuk	3	6	6
8	(Russia) E Rodina	6	1	1

Second round
1	(Italy) R Vinci	4	7	6
WC	(Hungary) T Babos	6	5	2
(Ukraine) A Bondarenko	3	1
(Slovakia) Z Kučová	6	6
3	(Czech Republic) K Zakopalová	7	7
Q	(Serbia) A Krunić	5	5
(Ukraine) K Bondarenko	6	6
(Ukraine) O Savchuk	3	2

Quarterfinals
1	(Italy) R Vinci	4	7^{7}	6
(Slovakia) Z Kučová	6	6^{3}	3
3	(Czech Republic) K Zakopalová	6	6
(Ukraine) K Bondarenko	0	4

Semifinals
1	(Italy) R Vinci	6	6
3	(Czech Republic) K Zakopalová	4	4

=== Bottom half ===
First round
7	(Romania) I-C Begu	6	6
(Spain) L Pous Tió	4	4
(Croatia) A Tomljanović	6	6
WC	(Hungary) V Lukács	2	2
(Italy) C Dentoni	3	1
Q	(Spain) E Cabeza Candela	6	6
(Czech Republic) E Birnerová	3	6	6
4	(Czech Republic) L Hradecká	6	4	2
5	(Spain) A Medina Garrigues	6	6
(Russia) A Pivovarova	3	1
(Ukraine) L Tsurenko	3	7	6
Q	(Hungary) R-L Jani	6	5	2
(Croatia) P Martić	5	5
(Switzerland) S Vögele	7	7
(Romania) M Gojnea	3	1
2	(Italy) S Errani	6	6

Second round
7	(Romania) I-C Begu	6	6
(Croatia) A Tomljanović	4	4
Q	(Spain) E Cabeza Candela	7^{7}	6
(Czech Republic) E Birnerová	6^{4}	3
5	(Spain) A Medina Garrigues	6	7
(Ukraine) L Tsurenko	2	5
(Switzerland) S Vögele	3	1
2	(Italy) S Errani	6	6

Quarterfinals
7	(Romania) I-C Begu	6	6
Q	(Spain) E Cabeza Candela	0	3
5	(Spain) A Medina Garrigues	4	7	3
2	(Italy) S Errani	6	5	0^{r}

Semifinals
7	(Romania) I-C Begu	6	6
5	(Spain) A Medina Garrigues	4	4
