= 2012 US Open – Women's doubles =

Women's doubles
- 2012 US Open

Final
- Champion: (Italy) Sara Errani (Italy) Roberta Vinci
- Runner-up: (Czech Republic) Andrea Hlaváčková (Czech Republic) Lucie Hradecká
- Score: 6–4, 6–2

Details
- Draw: 64 (6WC)
- Seeds: 16

Events
Singles	men	women		boys	girls
Doubles	men	women	mixed	boys	girls
WC Singles	men	women	quad
WC Doubles	men	women	quad
Legends	men	women	mixed
- US Open

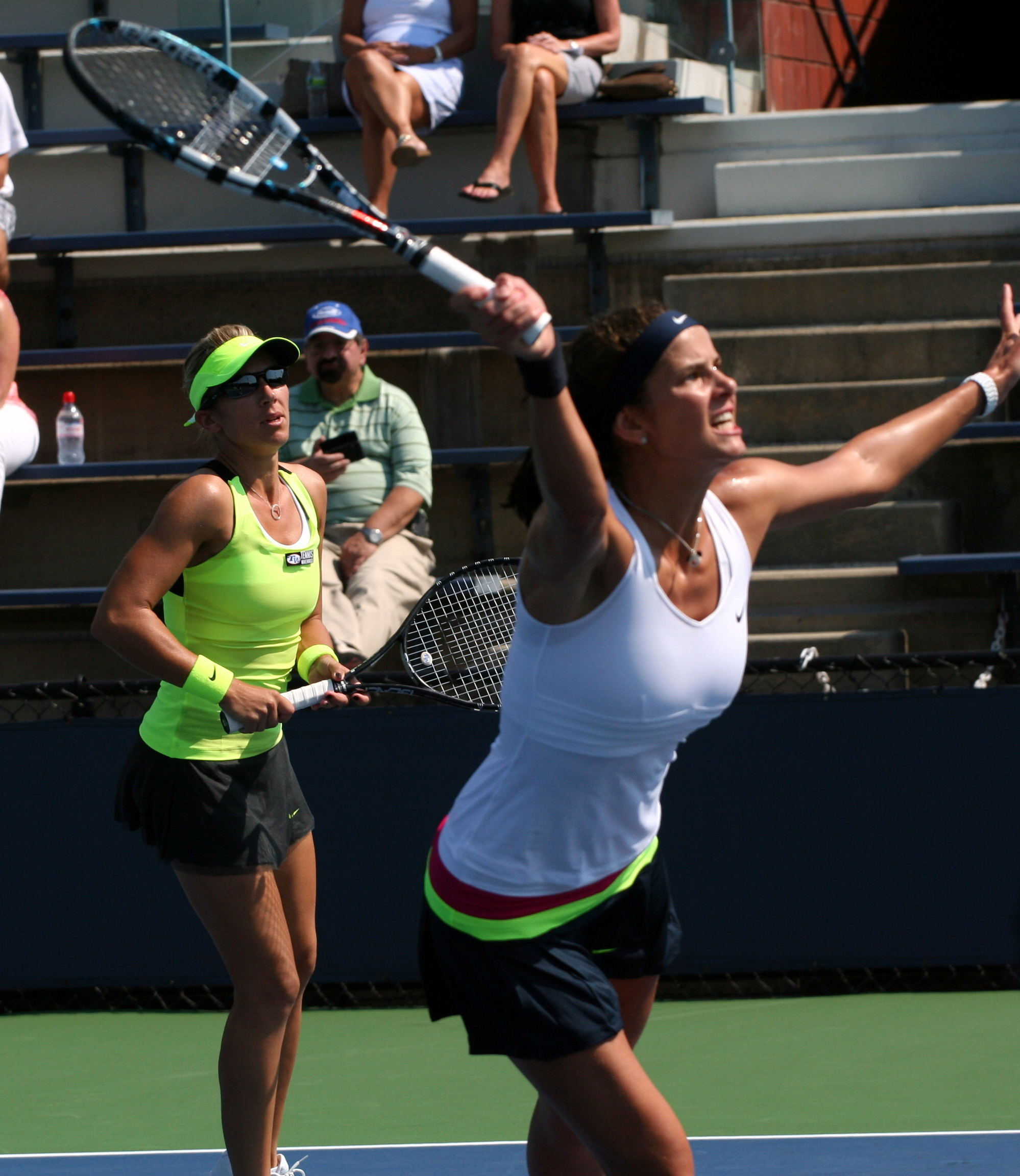

Liezel Huber and Lisa Raymond were the defending champions but lost to Hsieh Su-wei and Anabel Medina Garrigues in the third round.

Sara Errani and Roberta Vinci defeated Andrea Hlaváčková and Lucie Hradecká 6–4, 6–2 in the final to win the title.

== Seeds ==
1. (United States) Liezel Huber / (United States) Lisa Raymond (third round)
2. (Italy) Sara Errani / (Italy) Roberta Vinci (champions)
3. (Czech Republic) Andrea Hlaváčková / (Czech Republic) Lucie Hradecká (final)
4. (Russia) Maria Kirilenko / (Russia) Nadia Petrova (quarterfinals)
5. (United States) Vania King / (Kazakhstan) Yaroslava Shvedova (third round)
6. (Russia) Ekaterina Makarova / (Russia) Elena Vesnina (third round)
7. (Slovenia) Katarina Srebotnik / (China) Zheng Jie (first round)
8. (Spain) Nuria Llagostera Vives / (Spain) María José Martínez Sánchez (semifinals)
9. (United States) Raquel Kops-Jones / (United States) Abigail Spears (third round)
10. (Czech Republic) Iveta Benešová / (Czech Republic) Barbora Záhlavová-Strýcová (second round)
11. (Germany) Julia Görges / (Czech Republic) Květa Peschke (quarterfinals)
12. (Australia) Anastasia Rodionova / (Kazakhstan) Galina Voskoboeva (second round)
13. (United States) Bethanie Mattek-Sands/ (India) Sania Mirza (third round)
14. (South Africa) Natalie Grandin / (Czech Republic) Vladimíra Uhlířová (third round)
15. (Poland) Klaudia Jans-Ignacik / (France) Kristina Mladenovic (second round)
16. (Chinese Taipei) Hsieh Su-wei / (Spain) Anabel Medina Garrigues (semifinals)

== Draw ==
Key

- Q = Qualifier
- WC = Wild card
- LL = Lucky loser
- Alt = Alternate
- ITF = ITF entry
- PR = Protected ranking
- SR = Special ranking
- SE = Special exempt
- JE = Junior exempt
- JR = Junior Accelerator Programme entrant
- CO = College Accelerator Programme entrant
- NG = Next Gen Accelerator Program entrant
- w/o = Walkover
- r = Retired
- d = Defaulted

=== Final rounds ===
Quarterfinals
16	(Chinese Taipei) Hsieh Su-wei (Spain) Anabel Medina Garrigues	6	6
(Chinese Taipei) Chuang Chia-jung (China) Zhang Shuai	2	1
3	(Czech Republic) Andrea Hlaváčková (Czech Republic) Lucie Hradecká	6	6
(Germany) Sabine Lisicki (China) Peng Shuai	3	1
8	(Spain) Nuria Llagostera Vives (Spain) María José Martínez Sánchez	7	3	7^{7}
4	(Russia) Maria Kirilenko (Russia) Nadia Petrova	5	6	6^{5}
11	(Germany) Julia Görges (Czech Republic) Květa Peschke	2	6^{2}
2	(Italy) Sara Errani (Italy) Roberta Vinci	6	7^{7}

Semifinals
16	(Chinese Taipei) Hsieh Su-wei (Spain) Anabel Medina Garrigues	6^{2}	4
3	(Czech Republic) Andrea Hlaváčková (Czech Republic) Lucie Hradecká	7^{7}	6
8	(Spain) Nuria Llagostera Vives (Spain) María José Martínez Sánchez	3	2
2	(Italy) Sara Errani (Italy) Roberta Vinci	6	6

Final
3	(Czech Republic) Andrea Hlaváčková (Czech Republic) Lucie Hradecká	4	2
2	(Italy) Sara Errani (Italy) Roberta Vinci	6	6

=== Top half ===
==== Section 1 ====
First round
1	(United States) L Huber (United States) L Raymond	6	6^{8}	6
(Greece) E Daniilidou (Australia) C Dellacqua	4	7^{10}	4
(Australia) J Gajdošová (Poland) A Rosolska	6^{3}	7^{7}	7
(Belarus) O Govortsova (Russia) A Kudryavtseva	7^{7}	6^{5}	5
(Russia) V Dushevina (Thailand) T Tanasugarn	6	6
(France) S Foretz Gacon (Croatia) M Lučić	4	1
(Netherlands) M Krajicek (France) P Parmentier	4	0
16	(Chinese Taipei) S-w Hsieh (Spain) A Medina Garrigues	6	6
10	(Czech Republic) I Benešová (Czech Republic) B Záhlavová-Strýcová	6	6
(Netherlands) K Bertens (Netherlands) A Rus	3	3
(Romania) I-C Begu (France) A Cornet	6	4	3
(Germany) A Kerber (Austria) T Paszek	0	6	6
WC	(Belgium) K Clijsters (Belgium) K Flipkens	3	4
(Chinese Taipei) C-j Chuang (China) S Zhang	6	6
(Czech Republic) E Birnerová (Switzerland) R Oprandi	6	7
7	(Slovenia) K Srebotnik (China) J Zheng	4	5

Second round
1	(United States) L Huber (United States) L Raymond	6	7
(Australia) J Gajdošová (Poland) A Rosolska	2	5
(Russia) V Dushevina (Thailand) T Tanasugarn	4	4
16	(Chinese Taipei) S-w Hsieh (Spain) A Medina Garrigues	6	6
10	(Czech Republic) I Benešová (Czech Republic) B Záhlavová-Strýcová	2	3
(Germany) A Kerber (Austria) T Paszek	6	6
(Chinese Taipei) C-j Chuang (China) S Zhang	7	7
(Czech Republic) E Birnerová (Switzerland) R Oprandi	5	5

Third round
1	(United States) L Huber (United States) L Raymond	4	6	4
16	(Chinese Taipei) S-w Hsieh (Spain) A Medina Garrigues	6	2	6
(Germany) A Kerber (Austria) T Paszek	7^{9}	5	0
(Chinese Taipei) C-j Chuang (China) S Zhang	6^{7}	7	6

Quarterfinals
16	(Chinese Taipei) S-w Hsieh (Spain) A Medina Garrigues	6	6
(Chinese Taipei) C-j Chuang (China) S Zhang	2	1

==== Section 2 ====
First round
3	(Czech Republic) A Hlaváčková (Czech Republic) L Hradecká	6	6
(Hungary) M Czink (Hungary) Á Szávay	2	4
(Germany) M Barthel (Germany) T Malek	2	6	6
(Serbia) J Janković (Serbia) B Jovanovski	6	1	4
WC	(United States) S Crawford (United States) A Kiick	6	6^{4}	4
(Latvia) L Dekmeijere (Bosnia and Herzegovina) M Jugić-Salkić	3	7^{7}	6
(Chinese Taipei) H-c Chan (Chinese Taipei) Y-j Chan	6^{4}	1
14	(South Africa) N Grandin (Czech Republic) V Uhlířová	7^{7}	6
12	(Australia) A Rodionova (Kazakhstan) G Voskoboeva	7^{7}	3	6
(Germany) A-L Grönefeld (Croatia) P Martić	6^{5}	6	4
(Germany) S Lisicki (China) S Peng	6	6
(Israel) S Pe'er (United Kingdom) L Robson	0	3
WC	(United States) M Keys (United States) J Pegula	6	6
(Uzbekistan) A Amanmuradova (Romania) M Niculescu	2	2
(New Zealand) M Erakovic (United Kingdom) H Watson	2^{r}
6	(Russia) E Makarova (Russia) E Vesnina	3

Second round
3	(Czech Republic) A Hlaváčková (Czech Republic) L Hradecká	7^{7}	6
(Germany) M Barthel (Germany) T Malek	6^{1}	3
(Latvia) L Dekmeijere (Bosnia and Herzegovina) M Jugić-Salkić	2	3
14	(South Africa) N Grandin (Czech Republic) V Uhlířová	6	6
12	(Australia) A Rodionova (Kazakhstan) G Voskoboeva	2	1
(Germany) S Lisicki (China) S Peng	6	6
WC	(United States) M Keys (United States) J Pegula	3	6	6^{4}
6	(Russia) E Makarova (Russia) E Vesnina	6	4	7^{7}

Third round
3	(Czech Republic) A Hlaváčková (Czech Republic) L Hradecká	6	6
14	(South Africa) N Grandin (Czech Republic) V Uhlířová	3	3
(Germany) S Lisicki (China) S Peng	6	3	6
6	(Russia) E Makarova (Russia) E Vesnina	2	6	4

Quarterfinals
3	(Czech Republic) A Hlaváčková (Czech Republic) L Hradecká	6	6
(Germany) S Lisicki (China) S Peng	3	1

=== Bottom half ===
==== Section 3 ====
First round
8	(Spain) N Llagostera Vives (Spain) MJ Martínez Sánchez	6	6
(Russia) A Pavlyuchenkova (Czech Republic) L Šafářová	4	4
(Spain) S Soler Espinosa (Spain) C Suárez Navarro	6	6
WC	(United States) G Min (United States) M Oudin	1	4
(Hungary) T Babos (United States) S Stephens	7	4	2
(Slovakia) J Husárová (Slovakia) M Rybáriková	5	6	6
(Slovakia) D Cibulková (Slovakia) D Hantuchová	6	1	2
9	(United States) R Kops-Jones (United States) A Spears	4	6	6
15	(Poland) K Jans-Ignacik (France) K Mladenovic	6	6
(Sweden) S Arvidsson (Sweden) J Larsson	4	4
Alt	(United States) L Lee-Waters (United States) M Moulton-Levy	4	0
WC	(United States) S Williams (United States) V Williams	6	6
(Romania) A Cadanțu (France) M Johansson	2	3
WC	(United States) I Falconi (United States) M Sanchez	6	6
(United Kingdom) A Keothavong (Georgia (country)) A Tatishvili	0	3
4	(Russia) M Kirilenko (Russia) N Petrova	6	6

Second round
8	(Spain) N Llagostera Vives (Spain) MJ Martínez Sánchez	6^{5}	6	6
(Spain) S Soler Espinosa (Spain) C Suárez Navarro	7^{7}	2	4
(Slovakia) J Husárová (Slovakia) M Rybáriková	2	4
9	(United States) R Kops-Jones (United States) A Spears	6	6
15	(Poland) K Jans-Ignacik (France) K Mladenovic	4	0
WC	(United States) S Williams (United States) V Williams	6	6
WC	(United States) I Falconi (United States) M Sanchez	0	7	5
4	(Russia) M Kirilenko (Russia) N Petrova	6	5	7

Third round
8	(Spain) N Llagostera Vives (Spain) MJ Martínez Sánchez	3	7^{7}	7
9	(United States) R Kops-Jones (United States) A Spears	6	6^{2}	5
WC	(United States) S Williams (United States) V Williams	1	4
4	(Russia) M Kirilenko (Russia) N Petrova	6	6

Quarterfinals
8	(Spain) N Llagostera Vives (Spain) MJ Martínez Sánchez	7	3	7^{7}
4	(Russia) M Kirilenko (Russia) N Petrova	5	6	6^{5}

==== Section 4 ====
First round
5	(United States) V King (Kazakhstan) Y Shvedova	6	6
(Slovenia) P Hercog (Slovenia) A Klepač	0	1
(Czech Republic) Ka Plíšková (Czech Republic) Kr Plíšková	2	4
(Russia) N Bratchikova (Russia) A Panova	6	6
(Romania) S Halep (Ukraine) O Savchuk	3	0
(Czech Republic) R Voráčová (Czech Republic) K Zakopalová	6	6
(Japan) K Date-Krumm (Canada) A Wozniak	1	3
11	(Germany) J Görges (Czech Republic) K Peschke	6	6
13	(United States) B Mattek-Sands (India) S Mirza	6	6
(Italy) A Brianti (Romania) S Cîrstea	1	1
(Ukraine) K Bondarenko (Bulgaria) T Pironkova	2	6	4
(Croatia) D Jurak (Hungary) K Marosi	6	3	6
(Luxembourg) M Minella (Germany) A Petkovic	3	6	3
(United States) J Craybas (South Africa) C Scheepers	6	3	6
(United States) V Lepchenko (China) S Zheng	4	5
2	(Italy) S Errani (Italy) R Vinci	6	7

Second round
5	(United States) V King (Kazakhstan) Y Shvedova	6^{1}	7^{7}	6
(Russia) N Bratchikova (Russia) A Panova	7^{7}	6^{4}	4
(Czech Republic) R Voráčová (Czech Republic) K Zakopalová	3	4
11	(Germany) J Görges (Czech Republic) K Peschke	6	6
13	(United States) B Mattek-Sands (India) S Mirza	6	6
(Croatia) D Jurak (Hungary) K Marosi	4	2
(United States) J Craybas (South Africa) C Scheepers	4	2
2	(Italy) S Errani (Italy) R Vinci	6	6

Third round
5	(United States) V King (Kazakhstan) Y Shvedova	4	2
11	(Germany) J Görges (Czech Republic) K Peschke	6	6
13	(United States) B Mattek-Sands (India) S Mirza	4	7^{9}	2
2	(Italy) S Errani (Italy) R Vinci	6	6^{7}	6

Quarterfinals
11	(Germany) J Görges (Czech Republic) K Peschke	2	6^{2}
2	(Italy) S Errani (Italy) R Vinci	6	7^{7}
