= Alicja Rosolska =

Polish tennis player (born 1985)

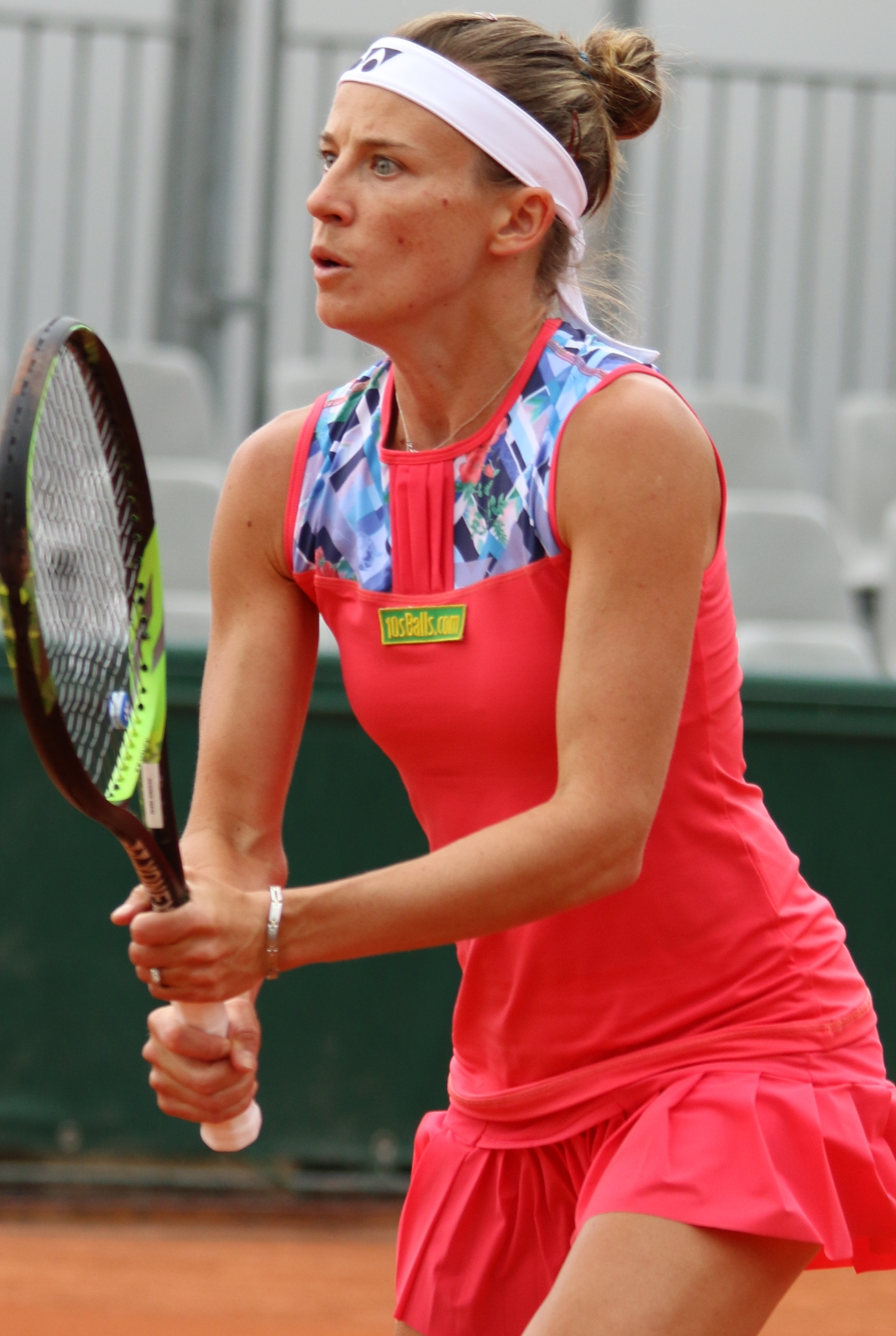
- Rosolska at the 2019 French Open
- Country (sports): Poland
- Born: 1 December 1985 (age 40) Warsaw
- Height: 1.66 m (5 ft 5 in)
- Turned pro: 2003
- Retired: 2026
- Plays: Right-handed (two-handed backhand)
- Prize money: US$ 2,176,481

Singles
- Career record: 45–100
- Career titles: 0
- Highest ranking: No. 636 (9 June 2003)

Doubles
- Career record: 445–529
- Career titles: 9 WTA, 14 ITF
- Highest ranking: No. 23 (10 June 2019)
- Current ranking: No. 1822 (29 June 2026)

Grand Slam doubles results
- Australian Open: 3R (2012, 2015)
- French Open: 3R (2013, 2017, 2022)
- Wimbledon: SF (2018)
- US Open: 3R (2008, 2014)

Other doubles tournaments
- Olympic Games: 1R (2008, 2012, 2024)

Grand Slam mixed doubles results
- Australian Open: 1R (2011, 2014, 2018, 2023)
- French Open: QF (2019)
- Wimbledon: 3R (2010)
- US Open: F (2018)

Team competitions
- Fed Cup: 28–13
Medal record
Representing Poland
Universiade
Silver medal – second place	2009 Belgrade	Doubles
Silver medal – second place	2009 Belgrade	Team
- Last updated on: 12 July 2026.

Alicja Rosolska (Polish pronunciation: [aˈlitsja rɔˈsɔlska]; born 1 December 1985) is a Polish former professional tennis player.

On 9 June 2003, she reached her best singles ranking of world No. 636. On 10 June 2019, she peaked at No. 23 in the doubles rankings.

Rosolska has won nine doubles titles on the WTA Tour in her career (in Cachantún with Līga Dekmeijere, in Marbella with Klaudia Jans, in Budapest with Anabel Medina Garrigues, in Monterrey with Gabriela Dabrowski, in Bastad with Andreea Mitu, in St. Petersburg with Jeļena Ostapenko, again in Monterrey with Nao Hibino, in Nottingham with Abigail Spears and in Charleston with Anna-Lena Grönefeld), as well as 14 doubles titles on the ITF Circuit.

She represented Poland in Fed Cup and both 2008 and 2012 Summer Olympics, in the women's doubles competitions again with Jans.

== Personal life ==
Her sister, Aleksandra Rosolska, is also a tennis player.

== Professional tour ==
=== 2004–07: First WTA Tour doubles final, major debut ===
In August 2004, she played her first WTA final in the doubles event at the Warsaw Open in Sopot. She and partner Klaudia Jans lost to Nuria Llagostera Vives and Marta Marrero.

During the season of 2005, she played two WTA finals but failed to win the trophy in both of them. First, she reached the final of the Tier II Warsaw Open in April. In July, she played at the Palermo Ladies Open. However, she lost both finals alongside Jans. At the 2005 Zurich Open, she made her Tier I debut but lost in the first round.

At the 2007 Australian Open, she made her major debut. Partnering with Vasilisa Bardina, she lost in the second round. Later, she reached second round of the French Open and US Open as well.

=== 2008–09: First WTA Tour doubles title, Olympics debut ===
In February 2008, she won her first WTA doubles title at the Cachantún Cup. It was the first final that she did not play alongside Jans. Partnering Līga Dekmeijere, she defeated Mariya Koryttseva and Julia Schruff in straight sets. In August, she made her Olympics debut in Beijing. She competed only in the doubles event, where alongside Jans, she lost in the first round to Lindsay Davenport and Liezel Huber. At the 2008 US Open, she entered for the first time the third round of a major.

She started into the season of 2009 at the Brisbane International where she returned to play alongside Jans but they lost to Anna-Lena Grönefeld and Vania King. In April, she won the first title with Jans, at the Andalucia Tennis Experience. In October, she reached another WTA tournament final at the Linz Open but finished runner-up.

=== 2010–11: Three Premier 5/Mandatory quarterfinals, second WTA title ===
In the first four months of 2010, Rosolska advanced to three semifinals. Right after that she reached her first Premier 5/Mandatory quarterfinal at the Italian Open. By the end of the year, she had reached four more semifinals.

Rosolska was successful during the first two weeks in 2011. She started season with the final of the Brisbane International (her second there), followed up then with semifinal of the Sydney International. In March, she reached her second career Premier 5/Mandatory quarterfinal, this time at the Indian Wells Open. Prior to the French Open, she played in the final of the Brussels Open alongside Jans but lost in a three-set match against Andrea Hlaváčková and Galina Voskoboeva. Right after Wimbledon, she won another title at the Budapest Grand Prix, partnering with Anabel Medina Garrigues. At the Canadian Open, she played another Premier 5/Mandatory quarterfinal.

=== 2012–14: Completing career Grand Slam third round ===
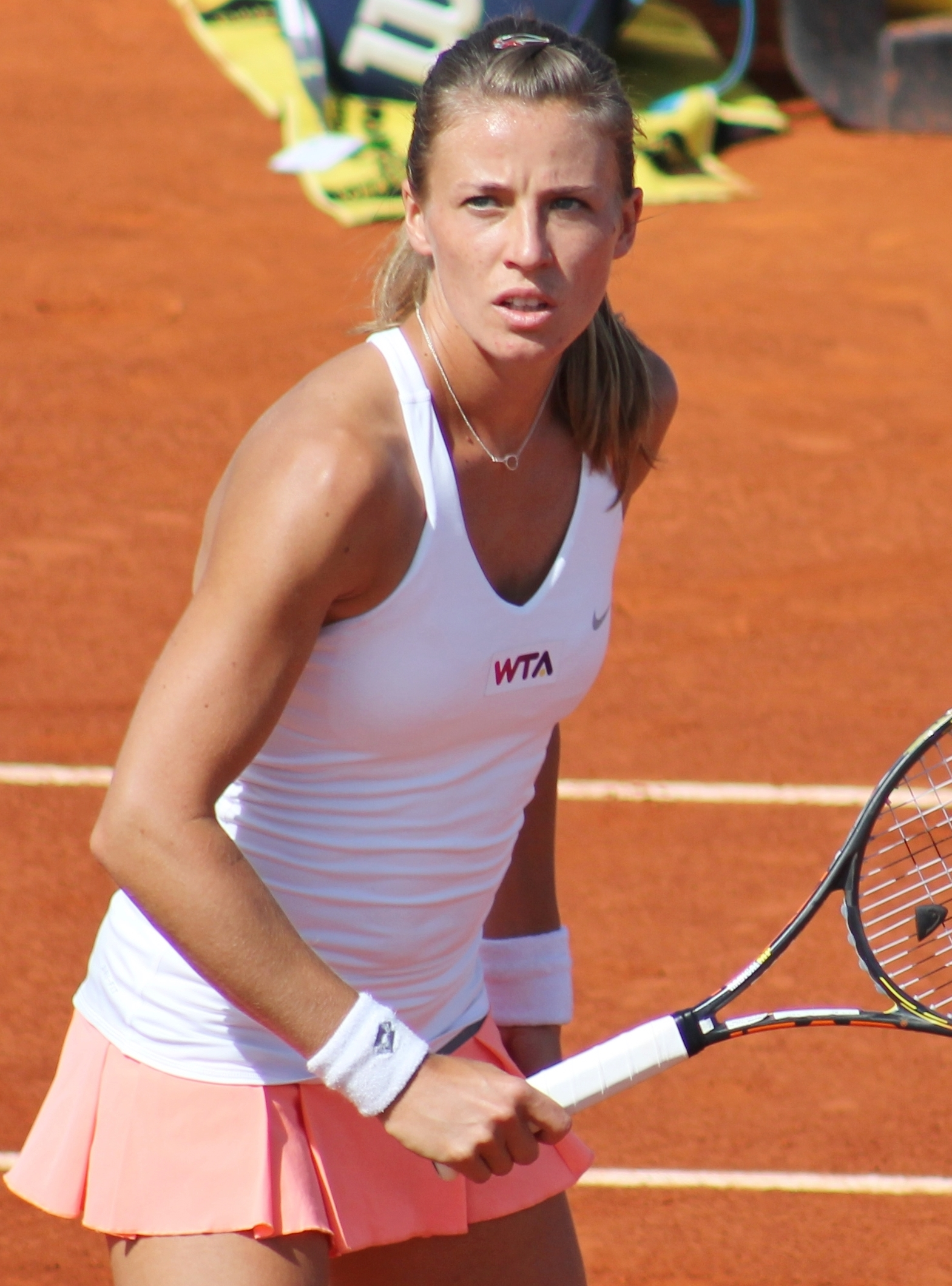
Rosolska at the 2014 Madrid Open.

At the 2012 Australian Open, she played her first third round there. That was her second one at a Grand Slam championship. Two weeks later, she reached semifinals of the Premier Open GdF Suez in Paris but then withdraw alongside Monica Niculescu. The week before the French Open, she advanced to the final of the Premier Brussels Open. For the second time in-a-row she failed to lift the trophy. In August, she played at the London Olympics, partnering with Jans-Ignacik (married in 2011); they lost to Maria Kirilenko and Nadia Petrova. She then entered the final of the Tournoi de Québec carpet tournament, but lost in three sets. At the China Open, she reached another Premier 5/Mandatory quarterfinal.

The first half of the 2013 season was marked with a lot of losing in the either first or second rounds. In late May, she reached semifinals of the Premier Brussels Open, for the third consecutive year. At the French Open, she reached third round as her first one there and third Grand Slam in total. At the Canadian Open, she advanced to another Premier 5/Mandatory quarterfinal. She finished the year with the Linz Open final and the semifinals of the Premier Kremlin Cup.

Despite the weak performances in 2014, Rosolska reached the third round of the US Open, completing third round of all four Grand Slam tournaments. Another big result during that year was the semifinal of the Linz Open.

=== 2015–17: Four more career doubles titles, Elite Trophy debut ===
In March 2015, she won title at the Monterrey Open alongside Gabriela Dabrowski. She continued with reaching quarterfinals of the Premier 5/Mandatory tournaments at the Italian Open and later at the Wuhan Open. For the first time, she played at the WTA Elite Trophy alongside Dabrowski. However, they lost both round-robin matches.

In late July 2016, she won the title at the Swedish Open, partnering with Andreea Mitu.

At the 2017 St. Petersburg Trophy, she won her first Premier-level title alongside Jeļena Ostapenko. In April, she won another WTA title at the Monterrey Open alongside Nao Hibino. At the Wuhan Open, she reached new Premier 5/Mandatory quarterfinal. For the second time, she qualified for the WTA Elite Trophy. This time she played alongside Anna Smith, but lost again both round-robin matches.

=== 2018–19: Wimbledon semifinal, first win at the Elite Trophy ===
In 2018, her first significant performance was at the Premier Dubai Championships where she reached semifinals. Two weeks later, she reached semifinal of the Ladies Open Lugano. At the Madrid Open, she reached quarterfinals. Her grass-court season was successful. She started with the title at the Nottingham Open as her first grass title. At Wimbledon, she reached her first significant Grand Slam result, reaching semifinals. Partnering with Abigail Spears, she lost to eventual champions Barbora Krejčíková and Kateřina Siniaková. She also reached semifinals at the Premier Connecticut Open and quarterfinal of the Premier Mandatory China Open. At the WTA Elite Trophy, she played alongside Mihaela Buzărnescu and won first match in the round-robin stage but then lost to the following one.

In January 2019, she advanced to the final of the Premier Sydney International. In April, she won the title of the green clay Premier Charleston Open. On her way to the trophy, alongside Grönefeld, she won all matches in the straight-sets. At the Elite Trophy, she lost both matches in the round-robin stage alongside Darija Jurak.

=== 2021–26: Major & two WTA 1000 quarterfinals, two more finals, retirement ===
At the 2020 Summer Olympics, postponed to 2021 due to COVID-19, Rosolska lost in the first round, alongside Magda Linette, to Bethanie Mattek-Sands and Jessica Pegula.

In January 2022, she reached the semifinals of the Adelaide International 2, partnering Erin Routliffe. They reached the quarterfinals on the WTA 1000 level at the Qatar Ladies Open and the Miami Open. The pair also reached two more finals at the WTA 500 St. Petersburg Trophy and the WTA 250 Bad Homburg Open.

At the French Open, she reached the third round for the third time in her career with Routliffe. She reunited with Routliffe for the Wimbledon Championships where they reached the quarterfinals.

Rosolska announced her retirement from professional tennis in July 2026, with her final appearance being the 2026 Polish Open.

== Performance timeline ==
Key
W	F	SF	QF	#R	RR	Q#	DNQ	A	NH

(W) winner; (F) finalist; (SF) semifinalist; (QF) quarterfinalist; (#R) rounds 4, 3, 2, 1; (RR) round-robin stage; (Q#) qualification round; (DNQ) did not qualify; (A) absent; (NH) not held; (SR) strike rate (events won / competed); (W–L) win–loss record.

Only main-draw results in WTA Tour, Grand Slam tournaments, Billie Jean King Cup, United Cup, Hopman Cup and Olympic Games are included in win–loss records.

=== Doubles ===
Current through the 2023 Wimbledon.

Tournament	2002	2003	2004	2005	2006	2007	2008	2009	2010	2011	2012	2013	2014	2015	2016	2017	2018	2019	2020	2021	2022	2023	2024	2025	SR	W–L	Win%
Grand Slam tournaments
Australian Open	A	A	A	A	A	2R	1R	2R	2R	1R	3R	1R	2R	3R	1R	2R	2R	2R	2R (Note: Withdrew before second-round match. Not counted as a loss.)	A	2R	1R	A	A	0 / 16	13–15	46%
French Open	A	A	A	A	A	2R	2R	2R	1R	1R	1R	3R	2R	1R	1R	3R	1R	2R	A	1R	3R	1R	A	A	0 / 16	11–16	41%
Wimbledon	A	A	A	A	A	1R	2R	2R	2R	2R	2R	1R	1R	1R	1R	1R	SF	2R	NH	1R	QF	1R	A	A	0 / 16	13–16	45%
US Open	A	A	A	A	A	2R	3R	2R	1R	1R	2R	1R	3R	1R	2R	2R	1R	2R	A	2R	2R	A	1R	A	0 / 16	12–16	43%
Win–loss	0–0	0–0	0–0	0–0	0–0	3–4	4–4	4–4	2–4	1–4	4–4	2–4	4–4	2–4	1–4	4–4	5–4	4–4	1–0	1–3	7–4	0–3	0–1	0–0	0 / 63	49–63	44%
National representation
Summer Olympics	NH	A	Not Held			A	1R	Not Held			1R	Not Held			A	Not Held				1R	Not Held		1R	NH	0 / 4	0–4	0%
Year-end championships
WTA Elite Trophy	Not Held													RR	A	RR	RR	RR	NH						0 / 4	1–7	13%
WTA 1000 + former^{†} tournaments
Qatar Open	Not Tier I						A	Not Held		NH	2R	1R	1R	NTI	1R	NTI	1R	NTI	1R	NTI	QF	2R			0 / 8	4–8	25%
Dubai Championships	Not Tier I							A	A	1R	Not Tier I			1R	NTI	1R	NTI	1R	NTI	A	NTI	NTI			0 / 4	0–4	
Indian Wells Open	A	A	A	A	A	A	2R	1R	1R	QF	1R	2R	1R	1R	1R	2R	1R	2R	NH	A	A	1R			0 / 13	6–13	32%
Miami Open	A	A	A	A	A	A	A	1R	1R	1R	2R	1R	1R	2R	2R	1R	1R	2R	NH	A	QF	2R			0 / 13	7–12	37%
Madrid Open	Not Held							2R	2R	2R	1R	1R	1R	1R	2R	2R	QF	1R	NH	A	2R	1R			0 / 13	7–13	35%
Italian Open	A	A	A	A	A	A	1R	2R	QF	1R	1R	1R	1R	QF	1R	2R	1R	2R	A	A	1R	1R			0 / 14	6–14	30%
Canadian Open								2R	2R	QF	1R	QF	2R	1R	2R	1R	1R	1R	NH	A	1R	A			0 / 12	8–12	40%
Cincinnati Open	Not Held		Not Tier I					1R	1R	2R	1R	A	1R	1R	A	2R	1R	1R	A	A	1R	A			0 / 10	2–10	17%
China Open	Not Held		Not Tier I					1R	2R	1R	QF	1R	1R	2R	1R	1R	QF	1R	Not Held						0 / 11	6–11	35%
Wuhan Open	Not Held												2R	QF	1R	QF	1R	1R	Not Held						0 / 8	5–8	38%
Guadalajara Open	Not Held																				2R	Not Tier I			0 / 12	7–12	37%
Pan Pacific Open^{†}								A	A	1R	1R	A	Not Tier I						Not Held		Not Tier I						
Zurich Open^{†}	A	A	A	1R	A	A	NTI	NTI	Not Held																0 / 1	0–1	0%
German Open^{†}	A	A	A	A	A	1R	2R	Not Held												Not Tier I					0 / 2	1–2	33%
Kremlin Cup^{†}	A	A	A	A	A	A	1R	Not Tier I											NH	NTI	Not Held				0 / 1	0–1	0%
Career statistics
Career	2002	2003	2004	2005	2006	2007	2008	2009	2010	2011	2012	2013	2014	2015	2016	2017	2018	2019	2020	2021	2022	2023	2024	2025	SR	W–L	Win%
Tournaments	1	1	6	11	11	18	23	23	26	29	29	27	30	30	29	29	29	30	6	17	24	2			Career total: 431		
Titles	0	0	0	0	0	0	1	1	0	1	0	0	0	1	1	2	1	1	0	0	0	0			Career total: 9		
Finals	0	0	1	2	0	0	1	3	0	3	2	1	0	1	1	3	1	2	0	0	4	0			Career total: 25		
Overall win–loss	0–1	0–1	3–6	7–11	5–11	7–18	16–22	20–22	21–26	22–28	20–27	17–27	15–30	20–32	10–28	28–28	26–28	23–30	2–5	6–17	30–25	1–2			9 / 431	299–425	41%
Win %	0%	0%	33%	39%	31%	28%	42%	48%	45%	44%	43%	39%	33%	38%	26%	50%	48%	43%	29%	26%	55%	33%			Career total: 41%		
Year-end ranking	524	373	164	99	91	84	50	47	47	38	44	50	61	45	76	31	29	32	54	125	34	134	430	356	$2,038,729		

== Grand Slam tournament finals ==
=== Mixed doubles: 1 (runner-up) ===
Result	Year	Tournament	Surface	Partner	Opponents	Score
Loss	2018	US Open	Hard	(Croatia) Nikola Mektić	(United States) Bethanie Mattek-Sands (United Kingdom) Jamie Murray	6–2, 3–6, [9–11]

== WTA Tour finals ==
=== Doubles: 25 (9 titles, 16 runner-ups) ===
Legend Tier II / Premier / WTA 500 (2–7) Tier III & IV / International / WTA 250 (7–9)	Finals by surface Hard (3–9) Grass (1–1) Clay (5–6)

Result	W–L	Date	Tournament	Tier	Surface	Partner	Opponents	Score
Loss	0–1	Aug 2004	Sopot Open, Poland	Tier III	Clay	(Poland) Klaudia Jans	(Spain) Nuria Llagostera Vives (Spain) Marta Marrero	4–6, 3–6
Loss	0–2	Apr 2005	Warsaw Open, Poland	Tier II	Clay	(Poland) Klaudia Jans	(Ukraine) Tatiana Perebiynis (Czech Republic) Barbora Záhlavová	1–6, 4–6
Loss	0–3	Jul 2005	Palermo Ladies Open, Italy	Tier IV	Clay	(Poland) Klaudia Jans	(Italy) Giulia Casoni (Ukraine) Mariya Koryttseva	6–4, 3–6, 5–7
Win	1–3	Feb 2008	Cachantún Cup, Chile	Tier III	Clay	(Latvia) Līga Dekmeijere	(Ukraine) Mariya Koryttseva (Germany) Julia Schruff	7–5, 6–3
Loss	1–4	Jan 2009	Brisbane International, Australia	International	Hard	(Poland) Klaudia Jans	(Germany) Anna-Lena Grönefeld (United States) Vania King	6–3, 5–7, [5–10]
Win	2–4	Apr 2009	Andalucia Tennis Experience, Spain	International	Clay	(Poland) Klaudia Jans	(Spain) Anabel Medina Garrigues (Spain) Virginia Ruano Pascual	6–3, 6–3
Loss	2–5	Oct 2009	Ladies Linz, Austria	International	Hard	(Poland) Klaudia Jans	(Germany) Anna-Lena Grönefeld (Slovenia) Katarina Srebotnik	1–6, 4–6
Loss	2–6	Jan 2011	Brisbane International, Australia	International	Hard	(Poland) Klaudia Jans	(Russia) Alisa Kleybanova (Russia) Anastasia Pavlyuchenkova	3–6, 5–7
Loss	2–7	May 2011	Brussels Open, Belgium	Premier	Clay	(Poland) Klaudia Jans	(Czech Republic) Andrea Hlaváčková (Kazakhstan) Galina Voskoboeva	6–3, 0–6, [5–10]
Win	3–7	Jul 2011	Budapest Grand Prix, Hungary	International	Clay	(Spain) Anabel Medina Garrigues	(South Africa) Natalie Grandin (Czech Republic) Vladimíra Uhlířová	6–2, 6–2
Loss	3–8	May 2012	Brussels Open, Belgium	Premier	Clay	(China) Zheng Jie	(United States) Bethanie Mattek-Sands (India) Sania Mirza	3–6, 2–6
Loss	3–9	Sep 2012	Tournoi de Québec, Canada	International	Hard (i)	(United Kingdom) Heather Watson	(Germany) Tatjana Malek (France) Kristina Mladenovic	6–7^{(5–7)}, 7–6^{(8–6)}, [7–10]
Loss	3–10	Oct 2013	Ladies Linz, Austria	International	Hard (i)	(Canada) Gabriela Dabrowski	(Czech Republic) Karolína Plíšková (Czech Republic) Kristýna Plíšková	6–7^{(6–8)}, 4–6
Win	4–10	Mar 2015	Monterrey Open, Mexico	International	Hard	(Canada) Gabriela Dabrowski	(Australia) Anastasia Rodionova (Australia) Arina Rodionova	6–3, 2–6, [10–3]
Win	5–10	Jul 2016	Bastad Open, Sweden	International	Clay	(Romania) Andreea Mitu	(Netherlands) Lesley Kerkhove (Belarus) Lidziya Marozava	6–3, 7–5
Win	6–10	Feb 2017	St. Petersburg Trophy, Russia	Premier	Hard (i)	(Latvia) Jeļena Ostapenko	(Croatia) Darija Jurak (Switzerland) Xenia Knoll	3–6, 6–2, [10–5]
Win	7–10	Apr 2017	Monterrey Open, Mexico (2)	International	Hard	(Japan) Nao Hibino	(Slovenia) Dalila Jakupović (Ukraine) Nadiia Kichenok	6–2, 7–6^{(7–4)}
Loss	7–11	Aug 2017	Stanford Classic, US	Premier	Hard	(France) Alizé Cornet	(United States) Abigail Spears (United States) CoCo Vandeweghe	2–6, 3–6
Win	8–11	Jun 2018	Nottingham Open, UK	International	Grass	(United States) Abigail Spears	(Romania) Mihaela Buzărnescu (United Kingdom) Heather Watson	6–3, 7–6^{(7–5)}
Loss	8–12	Jan 2019	Sydney International, Australia	Premier	Hard	(Japan) Eri Hozumi	(Serbia) Aleksandra Krunić (Czech Republic) Kateřina Siniaková	1–6, 6–7^{(3–7)}
Win	9–12	Apr 2019	Charleston Open, US	Premier	Hard	(Germany) Anna-Lena Grönefeld	(Russia) Irina Khromacheva (Russia) Veronika Kudermetova	7–6^{(9–7)}, 6–2
Loss	9–13	Feb 2022	St. Petersburg Trophy, Russia	WTA 500	Hard (i)	(New Zealand) Erin Routliffe	(Russia) Anna Kalinskaya (United States) Caty McNally	3–6, 7–6^{(7–5)}, [4–10]
Loss	9–14	Jun 2022	Bad Homburg Open, Germany	WTA 250	Grass	(New Zealand) Erin Routliffe	(Japan) Eri Hozumi (Japan) Makoto Ninomiya	4–6, 7–6^{(7–5)}, [5–10]
Loss	9–15	Aug 2022	Poland Open, Poland	WTA 250	Clay	(Poland) Katarzyna Kawa	(Kazakhstan) Anna Danilina (Germany) Anna-Lena Friedsam	4–6, 7–5, [5–10]
Loss	9–16	Oct 2022	Ostrava Open, Czech Republic	WTA 500	Hard (i)	(New Zealand) Erin Routliffe	(United States) Caty McNally (United States) Alycia Parks	3–6, 2–6

== WTA 125 finals ==
=== Doubles: 1 (runner-up) ===
Result	Date	Tournament	Surface	Partner	Opponents	Score
Loss	Aug 2026	Polish Open, Poland	Hard	(Poland) Martyna Kubka	(Poland) Weronika Falkowska (United States) Alana Smith	3–6, 1–6

== ITF Circuit finals ==
=== Doubles: 26 (14 titles, 12 runner-ups) ===
Legend $100,000 tournaments $75,000 tournaments $50,000 tournaments $25,000 tournaments $10,000 tournaments	Finals by surface Hard (5–5) Clay (8–7) Carpet (1–0)

Result	W–L	Date	Tournament	Tier	Surface	Partner	Opponents	Score
Win	1–0	Oct 2002	ITF Benevento, Italy	10,000	Hard	(Italy) Alexia Virgili	(Italy) Stefania Chieppa (Italy) Emily Stellato	6–4, 6–4
Loss	1–1	May 2003	ITF Olecko, Poland	10,000	Clay	(Poland) Monika Schneider	(Belarus) Ekaterina Dzehalevich (Australia) Michelle Summerside	2–6, 6–1, 4–6
Win	2–1	Aug 2003	ITF Gdynia, Poland	10,000	Clay	(Poland) Klaudia Jans	(Latvia) Irina Kuzmina (Poland) Monika Schneider	7–5, 6–2
Loss	2–2	Sep 2003	ITF Chieti, Italy	10,000	Clay	(Poland) Klaudia Jans	(Netherlands) Kika Hogendoorn (Austria) Betina Pirker	3–6, 6–7^{(6)}
Win	3–2	Sep 2003	ITF Gdynia, Poland	10,000	Clay	(Poland) Klaudia Jans	(Italy) Claudia Ivone (Italy) Giulia Meruzzi	6–0, 6–3
Loss	3–3	Feb 2004	ITF Tipton, United Kingdom	10,000	Hard	(Poland) Klaudia Jans	(United Kingdom) Rebecca Llewellyn (United Kingdom) Melanie South	6–2, 1–6, 4–6
Win	4–3	Feb 2004	ITF Warsaw, Poland	25,000	Hard (i)	(Poland) Klaudia Jans	(Hungary) Zsófia Gubacsi (Hungary) Kira Nagy	6–4, 6–3
Win	5–3	May 2004	ITF Olecko, Poland	10,000	Clay	(Poland) Karolina Kosińska	(Czech Republic) Iveta Gerlová (Slovakia) Zuzana Zemenová	6–4, 6–3
Loss	5–4	Jul 2004	Grado Tennis Cup, Italy	25,000	Clay	(Poland) Klaudia Jans	(Spain) Rosa María Andrés Rodríguez (Romania) Andreea Ehritt-Vanc	2–6, 2–6
Win	6–4	Aug 2004	ITF Gdynia, Poland	10,000	Clay	(Poland) Klaudia Jans	(Ukraine) Natalia Bogdanova (Ukraine) Valeria Bondarenko	6–2, 6–4
Win	7–4	Aug 2004	ITF Warsaw, Poland	10,000	Clay	(Poland) Klaudia Jans	(Slovakia) Martina Babáková (Czech Republic) Iveta Gerlová	6–2, 6–3
Loss	7–5	Feb 2005	ITF Capriolo, Italy	25,000	Hard (i)	(Poland) Klaudia Jans	(Ukraine) Mariya Koryttseva (Finland) Emma Laine	6–3, 4–6, 5–7
Win	8–5	May 2005	ITF Warsaw, Poland	25,000	Clay	(Poland) Karolina Kosińska	(Belarus) Tatiana Poutchek (Australia) Anastasia Rodionova	4–6, 6–2, 7–6^{(3)}
Loss	8–6	Mar 2006	ITF Las Palmas, Spain	25,000	Hard	(Poland) Karolina Kosińska	(Russia) Nina Bratchikova (Russia) Alla Kudryavtseva	1–6, 3–6
Loss	8–7	Apr 2006	Open de Biarritz, France	25,000	Clay	(Poland) Klaudia Jans	(Russia) Nina Bratchikova (Kazakhstan) Yaroslava Shvedova	3–6, 2–6
Loss	8–8	Jun 2006	ITF Prostějov, Czech Republic	75,000	Clay	(Latvia) Līga Dekmeijere	(Australia) Jarmila Gajdošová (Japan) Akiko Morigami	3–6, 6–7^{(3)}
Loss	8–9	Sep 2006	Open Porte du Hainaut, France	75,000	Clay	(Poland) Klaudia Jans	(Switzerland) Romina Oprandi (Germany) Jasmin Wöhr	6–4, 2–6, 4–6
Win	9–9	Oct 2006	ITF Barcelona, Spain	75,000	Clay	(Poland) Klaudia Jans	(Romania) Edina Gallovits-Hall (Germany) Vanessa Henke	6–1, 6–2
Win	10–9	Oct 2006	Slovak Open, Slovakia	75,000	Hard (i)	(Poland) Klaudia Jans	(Czech Republic) Lucie Hradecká (Czech Republic) Michaela Paštiková	6–1, 6–3
Win	11–9	Nov 2006	ITF Milan, Italy	50,000	Carpet (i)	(Poland) Klaudia Jans	(Ukraine) Mariya Koryttseva (Finland) Emma Laine	6–7^{(5)}, 7–5, 6–4
Loss	11–10	May 2007	Zagreb Open, Croatia	75,000	Clay	(Poland) Klaudia Jans	(Finland) Emma Laine (Hungary) Ágnes Szávay	1–6, 2–6
Win	12–10	Oct 2007	Open de Touraine, France	50,000	Hard (i)	(Poland) Klaudia Jans	(Czech Republic) Petra Cetkovská (Czech Republic) Barbora Strýcová	6–3, 7–5
Loss	12–11	Nov 2007	Internationaux de Poitiers, France	100,000	Hard	(Poland) Klaudia Jans	(Russia) Alla Kudryavtseva (Russia) Anastasia Pavlyuchenkova	6–2, 4–6, [1–10]
Win	13–11	Jun 2008	Internazionale di Rome, Italy	75,000	Clay	(Poland) Klaudia Jans	(Russia) Alina Jidkova (Canada) Marie-Ève Pelletier	6–3, 6–1
Win	14–11	Oct 2016	Internationaux de Poitiers, France	100,000	Hard (i)	(Japan) Nao Hibino	(Romania) Alexandra Cadanțu (Germany) Nicola Geuer	6–0, 6–0
Loss	14–12	Feb 2025	ITF Birmingham, UK	W50	Hard (i)	(Slovakia) Viktória Hrunčáková	(Portugal) Francisca Jorge (Portugal) Matilde Jorge	2–6, 6–4, [5–10]
