= Līga Dekmeijere =

Latvian tennis player

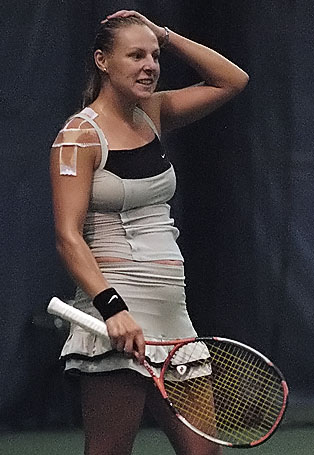
- Dekmeijere in 2008
- Country (sports): Latvia
- Born: 21 May 1983 (age 42); Riga, Latvia
- Height: 1.71 m (5 ft 7 1/2 in)
- Prize money: US$ 494,771

Singles
- Career record: 207–313
- Career titles: 0
- Highest ranking: No. 287 (26 August 2002)

Doubles
- Career record: 302–338
- Career titles: 1 WTA, 20 ITF
- Highest ranking: No. 54 (5 April 2010)

Grand Slam doubles results
- Australian Open: 2R (2005, 2010, 2011)
- French Open: 3R (2012)
- Wimbledon: 2R (2012)
- US Open: 2R (2008, 2009, 2011, 2012, 2013)

Grand Slam mixed doubles results
- Wimbledon: 1R (2013)

Team competitions
- Fed Cup: 14–16
- Last updated on: 19 July 2023.

Līga Dekmeijere (born 21 May 1983) is an inactive Latvian tennis player.

She has won one doubles title on the WTA Tour, as well as 20 doubles titles on the ITF Women's Circuit. On 26 August 2002, she reached her best singles ranking of world No. 287. On 5 April 2010, she peaked at No. 54 in the doubles rankings.

Dekmeijere has won her only WTA tournament title at the 2008 Cachantún Cup, where she entered the doubles draw with Poland's Alicja Rosolska, defeating Mariya Koryttseva and Julia Schruff in the final.

Playing for Latvia Fed Cup team, Dekmeijere has a win–loss record of 14–16.

== Doubles performance timeline ==
Key
W	F	SF	QF	#R	RR	Q#	DNQ	A	NH

(W) winner; (F) finalist; (SF) semifinalist; (QF) quarterfinalist; (#R) rounds 4, 3, 2, 1; (RR) round-robin stage; (Q#) qualification round; (DNQ) did not qualify; (A) absent; (NH) not held; (SR) strike rate (events won / competed); (W–L) win–loss record.

Tournament	2005	2006	2007	2008	2009	2010	2011	2012	2013	2014	W–L
Australian Open	2R	1R			1R	2R	2R	1R	1R	1R	3–8
French Open		2R			1R	A	2R	3R	2R	A	5–5
Wimbledon		1R			1R	1R	1R	2R	1R	A	1–6
US Open	1R	1R	1R	2R	2R	1R	2R	2R	2R	A	5–9
Win–loss	1–2	1–4	0–1	1–1	1–4	1–3	3–4	4–4	2–4	0–1	14–28

== WTA Tour finals ==
=== Doubles: 7 (1 title, 6 runner-ups) ===
Legend Grand Slam WTA 1000 Tier II / Premier (0–1) Tier III/IV/V / International (1–5)	Finals by surface Hard (0–4) Clay (1–1) Grass (0–1) Carpet (0–0)

Result	W–L	Date	Tournament	Tier	Surface	Partner	Opponents	Score
Loss	0–1	Nov 2005	Tournoi de Québec Canada	Tier III	Hard (i)	(United States) Ashley Harkleroad	(Russia) Anastasia Rodionova (Russia) Elena Vesnina	6–7^{(4–7)}, 6–4, 6–2
Loss	0–2	Jan 2006	Canberra International, Australia	Tier IV	Hard	(United Kingdom) Claire Curran	(Poland) Marta Domachowska (Italy) Roberta Vinci	7–6^{(7–5)}, 6–3
Win	1–2	Feb 2008	Cachantún Cup, Chile	Tier III	Clay	(Poland) Alicja Rosolska	(Ukraine) Mariya Koryttseva (Germany) Julia Schruff	7–5, 6–3
Loss	1–3	Jun 2008	Rosmalen Open, Netherlands	Tier III	Grass	(Germany) Angelique Kerber	(New Zealand) Marina Erakovic (Netherlands) Michaëlla Krajicek	6–3, 6–2
Loss	1–4	Apr 2009	Family Circle Cup, United States	Premier	Clay	(Switzerland) Patty Schnyder	(United States) Bethanie Mattek-Sands (Russia) Nadia Petrova	6–7^{(5–7)}, 6–2, [11–9]
Loss	1–5	Jan 2011	Hobart International, Australia	International	Hard	(Ukraine) Kateryna Bondarenko	(Italy) Sara Errani (Italy) Roberta Vinci	6–3, 7–5
Loss	1–6	Aug 2012	Texas Tennis Open, United States	International	Hard	(United States) Irina Falconi	(New Zealand) Marina Erakovic (United Kingdom) Heather Watson	6–3, 6–0

== ITF Circuit finals ==
=== Singles: 1 (runner–up) ===
Legend $10,000 tournaments	Finals by surface Clay (0–1)

Result	W–L	Date	Tournament	Tier	Surface	Opponent	Score
Loss	0–1	Oct 2010	ITF Williamsburg, United States	10,000	Clay	(United States) Lauren Davis	0–6, 0–6

=== Doubles: 30 (20 titles, 10 runner–ups) ===
Legend $100,000 tournaments $75,000 tournaments $50,000 tournaments $25,000 tournaments $10/15,000 tournaments	Finals by surface Hard (9–8) Clay (11–2)

Result	W–L	Date	Tournament	Tier	Surface	Partner	Opponents	Score
Win	1–0	Jul 1999	ITF Brussels, Belgium	10,000	Clay	(Armenia) Liudmila Nikoyan	(France) Ségolène Berger (France) Victoria Courmes	6–7^{(6–8)}, 6–3, 6–3
Win	2–0	Jul 2001	ITF Périgueux, France	10,000	Clay	(Estonia) Margit Rüütel	(France) Kildine Chevalier (Uruguay) Daniela Olivera	6–4, 6–1
Win	3–0	Jul 2001	ITF Casablanca, Morocco	10,000	Clay	(Russia) Irina Kornienko	(Japan) Chiaki Nakajima (Japan) Ayako Suzuki	6–1, 6–4
Win	4–0	Nov 2001	ITF Le Havre, France	10,000	Clay	(Russia) Maria Kondratieva	(Uruguay) Daniela Olivera (Madagascar) Natacha Randriantefy	6–4, 6–3
Win	5–0	Nov 2001	ITF Deauville, France	10,000	Clay	(Russia) Maria Kondratieva	(Republic of Ireland) Yvonne Doyle (Czech Republic) Eva Erbová	6–1, 7–6^{(9–7)}
Loss	5–1	Oct 2002	ITF Southampton, UK	25,000	Hard (i)	(Republic of Ireland) Yvonne Doyle	(Netherlands) Amanda Hopmans (Serbia and Montenegro) Dragana Zarić	2–6, 1–6
Win	6–1	May 2003	Fukuoka International, Japan	50,000	Carpet	(Japan) Nana Smith	(Japan) Saori Obata (Japan) Rika Fujiwara	6–2, 2–6, 6–4
Win	7–1	Oct 2003	Open de Touraine, France	25,000	Hard (i)	(Germany) Bianka Lamade	(Belgium) Leslie Butkiewicz (Belgium) Caroline Maes	6–1, 6–2
Win	8–1	Mar 2004	ITF Athens, Greece	25,000	Hard	(Germany) Martina Müller	(Hungary) Zsófia Gubacsi (Hungary) Kira Nagy	6–2, 1–6, 6–4
Win	9–1	May 2004	ITF Beijing, China	25,000	Hard	(Turkey) İpek Şenoğlu	(China) Rui Du (China) Liu Nannan	4–6, 6–4, 7–6^{(7–1)}
Win	10–1	May 2004	ITF Tongliao, China	25,000	Hard	(Turkey) İpek Şenoğlu	(Russia) Anna Bastrikova (Russia) Nina Bratchikova	7–5, 7–6^{(7–5)}
Loss	10–2	Jun 2004	ITF Beijing, China	50,000	Hard (i)	(Turkey) İpek Şenoğlu	(Chinese Taipei) Chuang Chia-jung (Indonesia) Wynne Prakusya	3–6, 1–6
Loss	10–3	Sep 2004	ITF Tunica, United States	25,000	Clay	(Belarus) Natallia Dziamidzenka	(United States) Tetiana Luzhanska (Canada) Aneta Soukup	2–6, 1–6
Win	11–3	Oct 2004	ITF Pelham, United States	25,000	Clay	(Belarus) Natallia Dziamidzenka	(United States) Sarah Riske (United States) Aleke Tsoubanos	6–3, 6–1
Win	12–3	Nov 2004	ITF Tucson, United States	50,000	Hard	(Czech Republic) Vladimíra Uhlířová	(United States) Krysty Marcio (United States) Jessica Nguyen	6–4, 6–4
Win	13–3	Nov 2004	ITF Palm Beach Gardens, US	50,000	Clay	(Japan) Nana Smith	(United States) Kelly McCain (United States) Kaysie Smashey	6–3, 6–2
Win	14–3	Jun 2005	Open de Marseille, France	50,000	Clay	(France) Caroline Dhenin	(Brazil) Maria Fernanda Alves (Canada) Marie-Ève Pelletier	6–2, 1–6, 6–2
Loss	14–4	May 2006	ITF Ho Chi Minh City, Vietnam	25,000	Hard	(Australia) Trudi Musgrave	(Chinese Taipei) Chuang Chia-jung (Thailand) Napaporn Tongsalee	6–4, 1–6, 0–6
Loss	14–5	May 2006	Beijing Challenger, China	50,000	Hard (i)	(Russia) Nina Bratchikova	(Chinese Taipei) Chuang Chia-jung (Thailand) Tamarine Tanasugarn	6–4, 2–6, 3–6
Loss	14–6	Jun 2006	ITF Prostějov, Czech Republic	75,000	Clay	(Poland) Alicja Rosolska	(Australia) Jarmila Gajdošová (Japan) Akiko Morigami	3–6, 6–7^{(3–7)}
Win	15–6	Sep 2006	ITF Tokyo, Japan	50,000	Hard	(Japan) Ayami Takase	(Japan) Yurika Sema (Japan) Mari Tanaka	7–6^{(7–3)}, 6–3
Win	16–6	Oct 2006	GB Pro-Series Glasgow, UK	25,000	Hard (i)	(Czech Republic) Veronika Chvojková	(United Kingdom) Katie O'Brien (Estonia) Margit Rüütel	6–4, 6–3
Loss	16–7	Jan 2007	ITF Waikoloa, US	50,000	Hard	(United States) Julie Ditty	(South Africa) Natalie Grandin (United States) Raquel Kops-Jones	0–6, 3–6
Loss	16–8	Mar 2007	ITF Coatzacoalcos, Mexico	25,000	Hard	(United States) Story Tweedie-Yates	(South Africa) Chanelle Scheepers (United States) Robin Stephenson	2–6, 2–6
Loss	16–9	Jul 2007	ITF Boston, US	50,000	Hard	(Turkey) İpek Şenoğlu	(Hungary) Melinda Czink (South Africa) Natalie Grandin	1–6, 3–6
Loss	16–10	Sep 2007	ITF Albuquerque, US	75,000	Hard	(United States) Varvara Lepchenko	(Hungary) Melinda Czink; Angela Haynes	5–7, 4–6
Win	17–10	Sep 2008	ITF Ashland, US	50,000	Hard	(Croatia) Jelena Pandžić	(United States) Julie Ditty (United States) Carly Gullickson	6–3, 3–6, [10–8]
Win	18–10	Mar 2011	ITF Clearwater, US	25,000	Hard	(United States) Kimberly Couts	(Canada) Heidi El Tabakh (Australia) Arina Rodionova	6–1, 6–4
Win	19–10	Apr 2011	ITF Pelham, US	25,000	Clay	(Canada) Marie-Ève Pelletier	(United States) Kimberly Couts (Canada) Heidi El Tabakh	2–6, 6–4, [12–10]
Win	20–10	Mar 2022	ITF Naples, US	15,000	Clay	(Russia) Maria Kononova	(United States) Qavia Lopez (United States) Madison Sieg	6–7^{(0–7)}, 6–3, [19–17]
