= Giulia Gabba =

Italian tennis player

- Country (sports): Italy
- Born: 20 February 1987 (age 38); Casale Monferrato, Italy
- Plays: Right-handed
- Prize money: $104,015

Singles
- Career record: 175–148
- Career titles: 0
- Highest ranking: No. 183 (16 July 2007)

Grand Slam singles results
- Wimbledon: Q2 (2007)
- US Open: Q1 (2006)

Doubles
- Career record: 66–53
- Career titles: 8 ITF
- Highest ranking: No. 157 (11 June 2007)

Giulia Gabba (born 20 February 1987) is a former professional tennis player from Italy.

== Career ==
Gabba, a right-handed player, was born in the northwest Italian town of Casale Monferrato. Her junior career included a win over Victoria Azarenka, at a tournament in Santa Croce, Italy.

All of her main-draw appearances on the WTA Tour were in doubles, most notably at Palermo in 2006, where she and Alice Canepa made it through to the final. The pair, who were featuring in the draw as qualifiers, were beaten in the final by Janette Husárová and Michaëlla Krajicek. Her regular doubles partner on the WTA Tour was Sara Errani. As a singles player, she had wins over both Barbora Strýcová and Kirsten Flipkens at the $75k Ortisei tournament in 2007. Later in the year she defeated Alizé Cornet en route to the quarterfinals of the $100k Tiro A Volo ITF event, after which she broke into the top 200 in the WTA rankings.

She won a total of eight doubles titles on the ITF Women's Circuit.

== WTA career finals ==
=== Doubles: 1 (runner-up) ===
Result	Date	Tournament	Tier	Surface	Partner	Opponents	Score
Loss	22 July 2006	Palermo Ladies Open, Italy	International	Clay	(Italy) Alice Canepa	(Slovakia) Janette Husárová (Netherlands) Michaëlla Krajicek	0–6, 0–6

== ITF finals ==
$50,000 tournaments
$25,000 tournaments
$10,000 tournaments

=== Singles (0–4) ===
Outcome	No.	Date	Tournament	Surface	Opponent	Score
Runner-up	1.	2 October 2005	Biella, Italy	Clay	(Ukraine) Yuliya Beygelzimer	2–6, 4–6
Runner-up	2.	24 September 2006	Lecce, Italy	Clay	(Romania) Simona Matei	3–6, 6–4, 3–6
Runner-up	3.	21 April 2007	Bari, Italy	Clay	(Germany) Angelika Rösch	4–6, 7–6^{(3)}, 5–7
Runner-up	4.	25 August 2008	Vlaardingen, Netherlands	Clay	(Bosnia and Herzegovina) Mervana Jugić-Salkić	7–6^{(5)}, 6–7^{(7)}, 5–7

=== Doubles (8–5) ===
Outcome	No.	Date	Tournament	Surface	Partner	Opponents	Score
Winner	1.	27 September 2004	Benevento, Italy	Hard	(Italy) Karin Knapp	(Slovakia) Martina Babáková (Czech Republic) Sandra Záhlavová	6–2, 0–1 ret.
Runner-up	1.	2 May 2005	Catania, Italy	Clay	(Italy) Valentina Sulpizio	(Italy) Alberta Brianti (Italy) Giulia Casoni	3–6, 3–6
Runner-up	2.	10 July 2005	Cuneo, Italy	Clay	(Italy) Sara Errani	(Ukraine) Mariya Koryttseva (Kazakhstan) Galina Voskoboeva	3–6, 5–7
Winner	2.	20 August 2005	Jesi, Italy	Hard	(Italy) Silvia Disderi	(New Zealand) Leanne Baker (Italy) Francesca Lubiani	6–2, 2–6, 6–4
Runner-up	3.	12 March 2006	Telde, Spain	Clay	(Italy) Sara Errani	(Russia) Nina Bratchikova (Russia) Alla Kudryavtseva	1–6, 1–6
Winner	3.	26 January 2007	Capriolo, Italy	Carpet (i)	(Italy) Sara Errani	(Ukraine) Mariya Koryttseva (Belarus) Darya Kustova	6–4, 7–5
Winner	4.	26 March 2007	Latina, Italy	Hard	(Italy) Sara Errani	(France) Stéphanie Cohen-Aloro (Tunisia) Selima Sfar	6–3, 1–6, 7–6^{(2)}
Winner	5.	27 May 2007	Gorizia, Italy	Clay	(Italy) Stefania Chieppa	(Italy) Denise Mascherini (Slovenia) Anja Prislan	6–3, 6–0
Runner-up	4.	27 September 2008	Lecce, Italy	Clay	(Italy) Stefania Chieppa	(Slovakia) Michaela Pochabová (Slovakia) Klaudia Boczová	4–6, 1–6
Winner	6.	11 September 2010	Casale Monferrato, Italy	Clay	(Italy) Federica di Sarra	(Italy) Federica Grazioso (Italy) Vivienne Vierin	6–2, 6–2
Winner	7.	10 September 2011	Casale Monferrato, Italy	Clay	(Russia) Irina Smirnova	(France) Morgane Pons (France) Alice Tisset	6–1, 6–3
Winner	8.	15 October 2011	Cagliari, Italy	Clay	(Italy) Alice Savoretti	(Netherlands) Valeria Podda (Netherlands) Jade Schoelink	6–4, 6–4
Runner-up	5.	3 September 2012	Trieste, Italy	Clay	(Italy) Alice Savoretti	(Czech Republic) Petra Krejsová (Czech Republic) Jesika Malečková	6–7^{(4)}, 1–6
