= Julia Schruff =

German tennis player

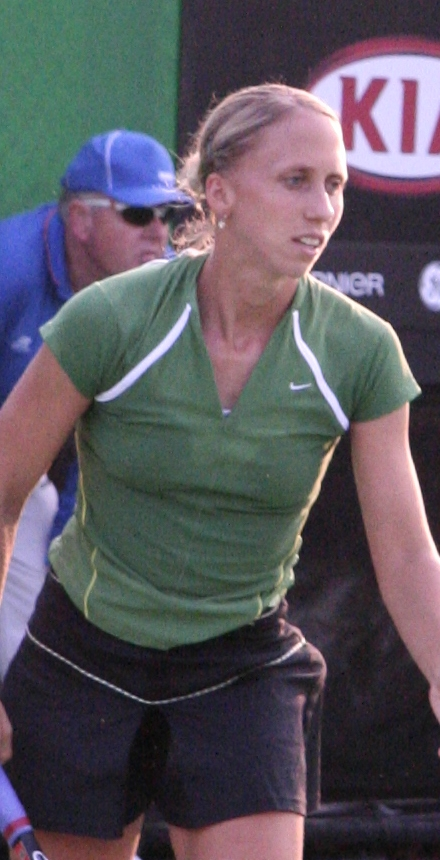
- Country (sports): Germany
- Residence: Augsburg, Germany
- Born: 16 August 1982 (age 42); Augsburg, West Germany
- Height: 1.66 m (5 ft 5 in)
- Turned pro: 1992
- Retired: 2011
- Plays: Right-handed (two-handed backhand)
- Prize money: $849,364

Singles
- Career record: 314–321
- Career titles: 2 ITF
- Highest ranking: 52 (17 April 2006)

Grand Slam singles results
- Australian Open: 2R (2007)
- French Open: 1R (2003–2007)
- Wimbledon: 1R (2005–2007)
- US Open: 3R (2005)

Doubles
- Career record: 112–146
- Career titles: 5 ITF
- Highest ranking: 99 (2 October 2006)
- Last updated on: 20 February 2012.

Julia Schruff (born 16 August 1982) is a retired professional German tennis player.

== Career ==
Her career high WTA-ranking was attained on 17 April 2006, when she reached No. 52. Her highest doubles ranking was reached on 2 October 2006, when she reached No. 99.

She enjoyed her breakthrough in 2003 when she reached the final at the Estoril Open in Portugal as a qualifier.

During her career, she has beaten two Top 10-ranked players so far – Anastasia Myskina at the 2005 Qatar Total German Open and Elena Dementieva at the 2006 Australian Open. She also has notched wins against top players such as Jelena Janković, Katarina Srebotnik, Flavia Pennetta, Jelena Dokić, Elena Likhovtseva and Alona Bondarenko.

Schruff has won her first ITF tournament in Latina, Lazio, where she defeated fellow German Andrea Petkovic in the final.

== WTA career finals ==
=== Singles: 1 (0-1) ===
Legend (singles)
Grand Slam (0)
Tour Championships (0)
Tier I Event (0)
Tier II Event (0)
Tier III Event (0)
Tier IV-V Event (1)
ITF Circuit (2)

Outcome	No.	Date	Tournament	Surface	Opponent	Score
Runner-up	1.	Apr 2003	Estoril, Portugal	Clay	(Spain) Magüi Serna	4–6, 1–6

=== Doubles: 2 (0-2) ===
Legend (pre/post 2009)
Grand Slam tournaments (0–0)
WTA Tour Championships (0–0)
Tier I / Premier Mandatory & Premier 5 (0–0)
Tier II / Premier (0–1)
Tier III, IV & V / International (0–1)

Outcome	No.	Date	Tournament	Surface	Partner	Opponents	Score
Runner-up	1.	Oct 2004	Filderstadt, Germany	Hard (i)	(Germany) Anna-Lena Grönefeld	(Australia) Rennae Stubbs (Zimbabwe) Cara Black	3–6, 2–6
Runner-up	2.	Feb 2008	Vina del Mar, Chile	Clay	(Ukraine) Mariya Koryttseva	(Poland) Alicja Rosolska (Latvia) Līga Dekmeijere	5–7, 3–6

== ITF finals ==
=== Singles (2-5) ===
$100,000 tournaments
$75,000 tournaments
$50,000 tournaments
$25,000 tournaments
$10,000 tournaments

Outcome	No.	Date	Tournament	Surface	Opponent	Score
Runner-up	1.	1 July 2001	Alkmaar, Netherlands	Clay	(Netherlands) Lotty Seelen	0–6, 3–6
Runner-up	2.	26 August 2001	Cuneo, Italy	Clay	(Italy) Yasmin Angeli	3–6, 6-7^{(7)}
Runner-up	3.	20 March 2005	Orange, United States	Hard	(South Korea) Cho Yoon-jeong	6–7^{(3)}, 1–6
Winner	4.	5 April 2009	Latina, Italy	Clay	(Germany) Andrea Petkovic	7–5, 7–6^{(0)}
Runner-up	5.	31 May 2009	Grado, Italy	Clay	(Czech Republic) Karolína Plíšková	6–7^{(2)}, 5–7
Runner-up	6.	18 July 2010	Darmstadt, Germany	Clay	(Russia) Vitalia Diatchenko	4–6, 7–5, 4–6
Winner	7.	13 September 2010	Alphen a/d Rijn, Netherlands	Clay	(France) Irena Pavlovic	6–0, 6–3

=== Doubles (5–5) ===
Outcome	No.	Date	Tournament	Surface	Partner	Opponents	Score
Runner-up	1.	30 August 1999	Bad Saulgau, Germany	Clay	(Germany) Caroline Raba	(New Zealand) Rewa Hudson (New Zealand) Shelley Stephens	7–6^{(9)}, 3–6, 0–6
Winner	2.	26 March 2001	Bari, Italy	Clay	(Germany) Rita Tarjan	(Slovakia) Eva Fislová (Czech Republic) Zuzana Hejdová	3–6, 7–5, 6–4
Winner	3.	26 August 2001	Cuneo, Italy	Clay	(Slovakia) Andrea Masaryková	(Italy) Yasmin Angeli (Italy) Monica Scartoni	6–2, 7–6^{(4)}
Runner-up	4.	19 December 2004	Bergamo, Italy	Hard	(Czech Republic) Lenka Němečková	(Italy) Giulia Casoni (Italy) Francesca Lubiani	2–6, 3-6
Runner-up	5.	18 September 2005	Bordeaux, France	Clay	(Germany) Jasmin Wöhr	(Spain) María José Martínez Sánchez (Spain) Conchita Martínez Granados	5–7, 2-6
Winner	6.	11 September 2006	Bordeaux, France	Clay	(France) Stéphanie Foretz	(Hungary) Kira Nagy (Germany) Jasmin Wöhr	7–6, 7–5
Runner-up	7.	8 September 2008	Athens, Greece	Clay	(Germany) Kristina Barrois	(Romania) Sorana Cîrstea (Kazakhstan) Galina Voskoboeva	2–6, 4–6
Winner	8.	5 April 2009	Latina, Italy	Clay	(Italy) Alberta Brianti	(Russia) Marina Shamayko (Italy) Emily Stellato	6–1, 6–4
Winner	9.	7 May 2010	Florence, Italy	Clay	(Estonia) Maret Ani	(China) Lu Jingjing (Belarus) Polina Pekhova	6–3, 6–4
Runner-up	10.	8 August 2010	Hechingen, Germany	Clay	(Japan) Erika Sema	(Romania) Irina-Camelia Begu (France) Anaïs Laurendon	2–6, 6–4, [8–10]
