= Cachantún Cup =

2008 tennis tournament in Chile

Coordinates: 32°59′30″S 71°32′47″W

Defunct tennis tournament
- Founded: 2008
- Abolished: 2008
- Location: Viña del Mar; Chile
- Category: Tier III
- Surface: Red Clay / outdoors
- Draw: 32S/32Q/16D
- Prize money: $200,000

The Cachantún Cup is a women's tennis tournament that was held at the Centro de Tenis Las Salinas, at the Club Naval de Campo Las Salinas in Viña del Mar, Chile. The tournament was competed once, in 2008, from February 11 to February 17.

== Past finals ==
=== Singles ===
Year	Champion	Runner-up	Score
2008	(Italy) Flavia Pennetta	(Czech Republic) Klára Zakopalová	6–4, 5–4 ret.

=== Doubles ===
Year	Champion	Runner-up	Score
2008	(Latvia) Līga Dekmeijere (Poland) Alicja Rosolska	(Ukraine) Mariya Koryttseva (Germany) Julia Schruff	7–5, 6–3

== See also ==
- List of tennis tournaments
