= Mariya Koryttseva =

Ukrainian tennis player

Mariya Koryttseva Марія Коритцева
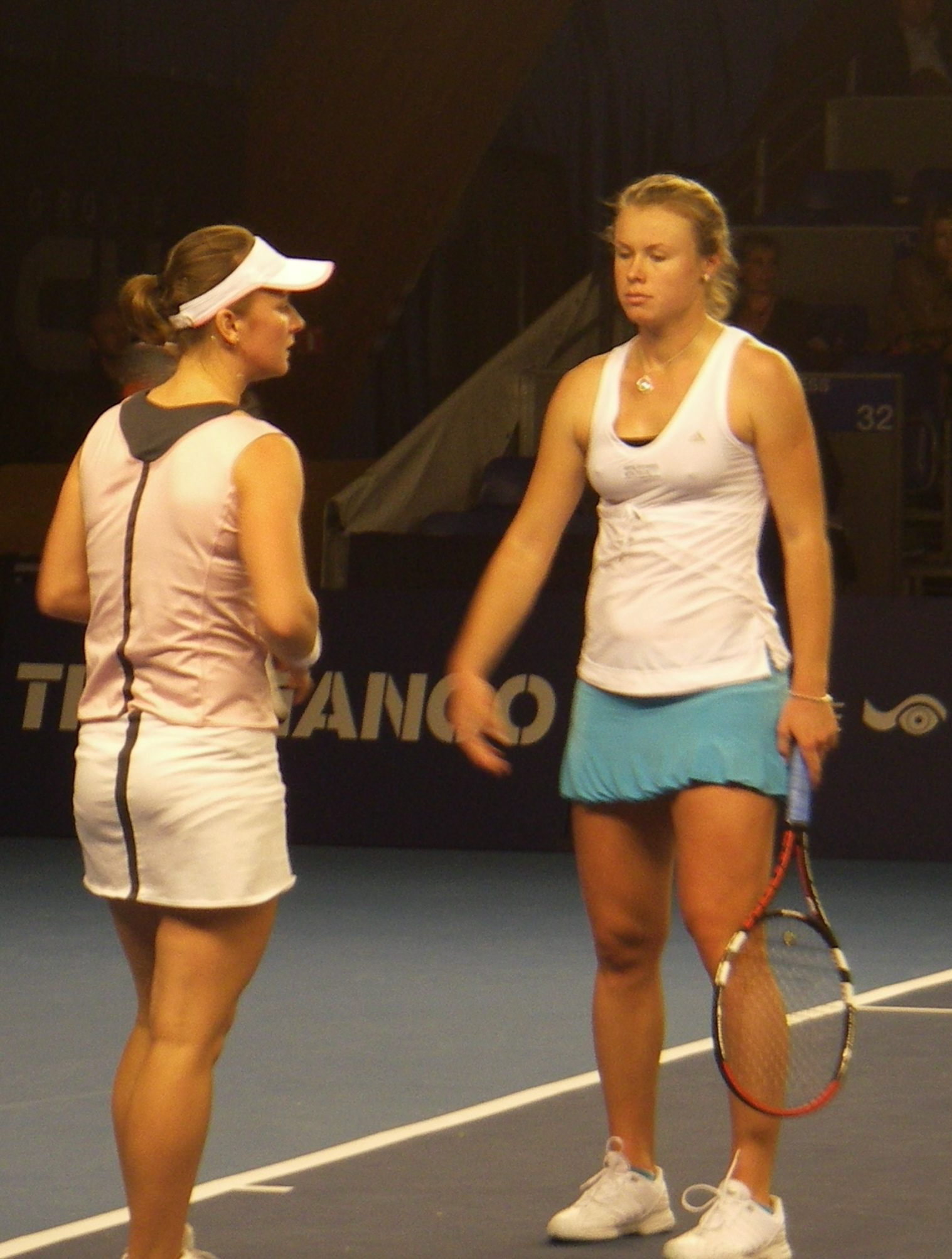
- Koryttseva (left) with doubles partner Vera Dushevina at the 2008 Fortis Championships Luxembourg
- Country (sports): Ukraine
- Residence: Kharkiv, Ukraine
- Born: 25 May 1985 (age 39); Kiev, Soviet Union
- Height: 1.72 m (5 ft 7 1/2 in)
- Turned pro: 2001
- Plays: Right (two-handed backhand)
- Prize money: $903,644

Singles
- Career record: 299–225
- Career titles: 0 WTA, 7 ITF
- Highest ranking: No. 50 (18 August 2008)

Grand Slam singles results
- Australian Open: 2R (2008)
- French Open: 2R (2009)
- Wimbledon: 1R (2008, 2009, 2010)
- US Open: 1R (2008, 2009)

Doubles
- Career record: 230–159
- Career titles: 6 WTA, 20 ITF
- Highest ranking: No. 39 (23 June 2008)

Grand Slam doubles results
- Australian Open: 3R (2008)
- French Open: 3R (2008)
- Wimbledon: 3R (2009)
- US Open: 2R (2011)

Team competitions
- Fed Cup: 5–5

Mariya Serhiyivna Koryttseva (Ukrainian: Марія Сергіївна Коритцева; born 25 May 1985) is a Ukrainian former tennis player.

On 18 August 2008, she achieved her career-high singles ranking of world No. 50. On 23 June 2008, she peaked at No. 39 in the doubles rankings.

== Career ==
Koryttseva made a surprising run to the final of the Sunfeast Open, held in Kolkata, in September 2007. En route to her appearance in the final, she beat Monique Adamczak, Vania King, who had defeated the No. 1 seed Marion Bartoli in the previous round, Tatiana Poutchek and Anne Keothavong. Her run came to an end at the hands of Maria Kirilenko, who beat her in the final. She lost the doubles final as well.

She has won six doubles titles on the WTA Tour, two coming at Palermo, where she won with Giulia Casoni in 2005, and again with Darya Kustova in 2007. She won the 2008 Auckland Open with Lilia Osterloh. She was also the runner-up in doubles at Kolkata in 2007, where she lost the singles final, and lost the doubles final with Alberta Brianti to Vania King and Alla Kudryavtseva.

On the ITF Circuit, where she has played the majority of her career, she won 7 singles and 20 doubles titles. One of these came at the $100k event in Kharkiv.

In the second round of qualifying for the 2008 Kremlin Cup, Koryttseva beat Anastasia Pivovarova 6–3, 6–7, 7–5 in 3 hours and 55 minutes, making it the third longest match in the Open Era.

Between March 2012 and September 2015, Koryttseva didn't play any WTA or ITF tournament. She has not been on the professional tour since May 2017.

== WTA career finals ==
=== Singles: 2 runner-ups ===
Legend
Grand Slam tournaments
Premier M & Premier 5
Premier
International (0–2)

Result	No.	Date	Tournament	Surface	Opponent	Score
Loss	1.	Sep 2007	Kolkata Open, India	Carpet (i)	(Russia) Maria Kirilenko	0–6, 2–6
Loss	2.	Jul 2008	Palermo Ladies Open, Italy	Clay	(Italy) Sara Errani	2–6, 3–6

=== Doubles: 10 (6 titles, 4 runner-ups) ===
Legend
Grand Slam tournaments
Premier M & Premier 5
Premier
International (6–4)

Result	No.	Date	Tournament	Surface	Partner	Opponents	Score
Win	1.	Jul 2005	Palermo Ladies Open, Italy	Clay	(Italy) Giulia Casoni	(Poland) Klaudia Jans (Poland) Alicja Rosolska	4–6, 6–3, 7–5
Win	2.	Jul 2007	Palermo Ladies Open], Italy	Clay	(Belarus) Darya Kustova	(Italy) Alice Canepa (Italy) Karin Knapp	6–4, 6–1
Loss	1.	Oct 2007	Kolkata Open, India	Hard	(Italy) Alberta Brianti	(Russia) Alla Kudryavtseva (United States) Vania King	1–6, 4–6
Win	3.	Jan 2008	Auckland Open, New Zealand	Hard	(United States) Lilia Osterloh	(Germany) Martina Müller (Czech Republic) Barbora Záhlavová-Strýcová	6–3, 6–4
Loss	2.	Feb 2008	Cachantún Cup, Chile	Clay	(Germany) Julia Schruff	(Poland) Alicja Rosolska (Latvia) Līga Dekmeijere	5–7, 3–6
Win	4.	Sep 2008	Guangzhou Open, China	Hard	(Belarus) Tatiana Poutchek	(China) Sun Tiantian (China) Yan Zi	6–3, 4–6, [10–8]
Loss	3.	Oct 2008	Luxembourg Open	Hard (i)	(Russia) Vera Dushevina	(Romania) Sorana Cîrstea (New Zealand) Marina Eraković	6–2, 3–6, [8–10]
Loss	4.	Jul 2009	Palermo Ladies Open, Italy	Clay	(Belarus) Darya Kustova	(Spain) Nuria Llagostera Vives (Spain) María José Martínez Sánchez	1–6, 2–6
Win	5.	Feb 2011	Mexican Open	Hard	(Romania) Raluca Olaru	(Spain) Lourdes Domínguez Lino (Spain) Arantxa Parra Santonja	5–7, 7–5, [10–6]
Win	6.	Jul 2011	Baku Cup, Azerbaijan	Hard	(Belarus) Tatiana Poutchek	(Romania) Monica Niculescu (Kazakhstan) Galina Voskoboeva	6–3, 2–6, [10–8]

== ITF finals ==
=== Singles: 14 (7–7) ===
$100,000 tournaments
$75,000 tournaments
$50,000 tournaments
$25,000 tournaments
$10,000 tournaments

Result	No.	Date	Tournament	Surface	Opponent	Score
Loss	1.	29 April 2002	ITF Dubrovnik, Croatia	Clay	(Austria) Tina Schiechtl	6–4, 4–6, 3–6
Win	1.	14 July 2002	ITF Toruń, Poland	Clay	(Czech Republic) Jana Macurová	6–3, 6–0
Loss	2.	25 May 2003	ITF Lviv, Ukraine	Clay	(Ukraine) Olga Lazarchuk	4–6, 0–6
Win	2.	20 July 2003	ITF Garching, Germany	Clay	(Netherlands) Elise Tamaëla	2–6, 6–4, 6–2
Loss	3.	25 August 2003	ITF Rimini, Italy	Clay	(Bosnia and Herzegovina) Mervana Jugić-Salkić	1–6, 3–6
Loss	4.	21 September 2003	ITF Tbilisi, Georgia	Clay	(Russia) Elena Vesnina	4–6, 3–6
Win	3.	29 May 2005	ITF Campobasso, Italy	Clay	(Slovakia) Zuzana Kučová	5–7, 6–1, 7–5
Win	4.	5 June 2005	ITF Galatina, Italy	Clay	(Russia) Elena Vesnina	6–3, 6–2
Loss	5.	14 August 2005	ITF Rimini, Italy	Clay	(Spain) Lourdes Domínguez Lino	6–0, 0–6, 3–6
Win	5.	25 September 2005	ITF Jounieh Open, Lebanon	Clay	(Spain) Lourdes Domínguez Lino	7–5, 7–5
Loss	6.	30 October 2005	ITF Istanbul, Turkey	Hard	(Ukraine) Oxana Lyubtsova	6–2, 1–6, 1–6
Loss	7.	13 May 2007	ITF Jounieh Open, Lebanon	Clay	(Tunisia) Selima Sfar	2–6, 6–4, 6–7^{(3)}
Win	6.	5 November 2007	ITF Jounieh, Lebanon	Clay	(Germany) Laura Siegemund	6–1, 6–3
Win	7.	10 September 2016	ITF Bucha, Ukraine	Clay	(Moldova) Alexandra Perper	4–0 ret.

=== Doubles: 30 (20–10) ===
Result	No.	Date	Tournament	Surface	Partner	Opponents	Score
Win	1.	16 June 2002	ITF Kędzierzyn-Koźle, Poland	Clay	(Ukraine) Valeria Bondarenko	(Czech Republic) Lenka Tvarošková (Slovakia) Martina Babáková	6–3, 6–0
Loss	1.	19 May 2003	ITF Lviv, Ukraine	Clay	(France) Iryna Brémond	(Russia) Anna Bastrikova (Ukraine) Anna Zaporozhanova	4–6, 4–6
Win	2.	16 June 2003	Lenzerheide, Switzerland	Clay	(Bulgaria) Dimana Krastevitch	(Germany) Claudia Kuleszka (Lithuania) Lina Stančiūtė	6–3, 6–2
Win	3.	18 April 2004	Open de Biarritz, France	Clay	(Ukraine) Elena Tatarkova	(Ukraine) Alona Bondarenko (Ukraine) Valeria Bondarenko	7–5, 6–0
Loss	2.	3 May 2004	ITF Catania, Italy	Clay	(Belarus) Nadejda Ostrovskaya	(France) Stéphanie Foretz (France) Virginie Razzano	2–6, 1–6
Loss	3.	28 June 2004	ITF Stuttgart, Germany	Clay	(Croatia) Darija Jurak	(Germany) Vanessa Henke (Netherlands) Anousjka van Exel	4–6, 5–7
Win	4.	2 August 2004	ITF Rimini, Italy	Clay	(Ukraine) Yuliana Fedak	(Spain) Rosa María Andrés Rodríguez (Romania) Andreea Ehritt-Vanc	7–6^{(7)}, 6–3
Win	5.	7 February 2005	ITF Capriolo, Italy	Hard (i)	(Finland) Emma Laine	(Poland) Klaudia Jans (Poland) Alicja Rosolska	3–6, 6–4, 7–5
Win	6.	5 April 2005	ITF Coatzacoalcos, Mexico	Hard	(Hungary) Rita Kuti-Kis	(France) Kildine Chevalier (Argentina) Jorgelina Cravero	6–2, 6–3
Win	7.	10 July 2005	ITF Cuneo, Italy	Clay	(Kazakhstan) Galina Voskoboeva	(Italy) Sara Errani (Italy) Giulia Gabba	6–3, 7–5
Win	8.	7 August 2005	ITF Martina Franca, Italy	Clay	(Hungary) Zsófia Gubacsi	(Spain) Lourdes Domínguez Lino (Spain) Conchita Martínez Granados	6–1, 6–3
Win	9.	14 August 2005	ITF Rimini, Italy	Clay	(Italy) Giulia Casoni	(Belarus) Darya Kustova (Russia) Ekaterina Makarova	6–2, 6–4
Loss	4.	11 September 2005	Open Denain, France	Clay	(Hungary) Zsófia Gubacsi	(Czech Republic) Lucie Hradecká (Czech Republic) Vladimíra Uhlířová	0–6, 5–7
Win	10.	25 September 2005	ITF Jounieh Open, Lebanon	Clay	(Belarus) Anastasiya Yakimova	(Ukraine) Olena Antypina (Czech Republic) Hana Šromová	7–5, 6–2
Win	11.	30 October 2005	ITF Istanbul, Turkey	Hard	(Hungary) Zsófia Gubacsi	(Poland) Agnieszka Radwańska (Poland) Urszula Radwańska	6–3, 6–3
Win	12.	16 October 2006	Open Saint-Raphaël, France	Carpet	(Kazakhstan) Galina Voskoboeva	(France) Alizé Cornet (France) Youlia Fedossova	6–2, 6–4
Loss	5.	27 November 2006	ITF Milan, Italy	Carpet (i)	(Finland) Emma Laine	(Poland) Klaudia Jans (Poland) Alicja Rosolska	7–6^{(5)}, 5–7, 4–6
Loss	6.	26 January 2007	ITF Capriolo, Italy	Carpet (i)	(Belarus) Darya Kustova	(Italy) Sara Errani (Italy) Giulia Gabba	4–6, 5–7
Win	13.	4 February 2007	ITF Ortisei, Italy	Carpet (i)	(Czech Republic) Olga Vymetálková	(Belarus) Darya Kustova (Belarus) Tatiana Poutchek	6–3, 4–6, 6–3
Win	14.	9 April 2007	ITF Civitavecchia, Italy	Clay	(Belarus) Ekaterina Dzehalevich	(Belarus) Darya Kustova (Russia) Ekaterina Makarova	7–6^{(8)}, 5–7, 6–1
Win	15.	16 April 2007	ITF Bari, Italy	Clay	(Ukraine) Veronika Kapshay	(Australia) Sophie Ferguson (Slovakia) Katarína Kachlíková	7–5, 6–2
Loss	7.	18 August 2007	Bronx Open, United States	Hard	(Belarus) Darya Kustova	(Czech Republic) Lucie Hradecká (Poland) Urszula Radwańska	3–6, 6–1, 1–6
Win	16.	12 September 2007	ITF Kharkiv, Ukraine	Hard	(Belarus) Darya Kustova	(Ukraine) Alona Bondarenko (Ukraine) Kateryna Bondarenko	7–6^{(10)}, 6–3
Win	17.	19 October 2008	ITF Ortisei, Italy	Carpet (i)	(Kazakhstan) Yaroslava Shvedova	(Estonia) Maret Ani (Kazakhstan) Galina Voskoboeva	6–2, 6–1
Win	18.	10 October 2009	ITF Jounieh Open, Lebanon	Clay	(Belarus) Darya Kustova	(Belarus) Ekaterina Dzehalevich (Ukraine) Yuliana Fedak	6–3, 6–4
Win	19.	11 September 2010	ITF Biella, Italy	Clay	(Romania) Raluca Olaru	(Slovenia) Andreja Klepač (France) Aurélie Védy	7–5, 6–4
Loss	8.	20 September 2010	Open de Saint-Malo, France	Clay	(Romania) Raluca Olaru	(Czech Republic) Petra Cetkovská (Czech Republic) Lucie Hradecká	4–6, 2–6
Loss	9.	5 March 2012	ITF Irapuato, Mexico	Hard	(Italy) Maria Elena Camerin	(Slovakia) Janette Husárová (Hungary) Katalin Marosi	2–6, 7–6^{(9)}, [7–10]
Loss	10.	12 March 2012	ITF Poza Rica, Mexico	Hard	(Italy) Maria Elena Camerin	(Slovakia) Jana Čepelová (Slovakia) Lenka Wienerová	5–7, 6–2, [3–10]
Win	20.	12 November 2016	ITF Antalya, Turkey	Hard	(Ukraine) Diana Khodan	(Turkey) Berfu Cengiz (Turkey) Melis Sezer	6–1, 6–4

== Grand Slam singles performance timeline ==
Key
W	F	SF	QF	#R	RR	Q#	DNQ	A	NH

(W) winner; (F) finalist; (SF) semifinalist; (QF) quarterfinalist; (#R) rounds 4, 3, 2, 1; (RR) round-robin stage; (Q#) qualification round; (DNQ) did not qualify; (A) absent; (NH) not held; (SR) strike rate (events won / competed); (W–L) win–loss record.

Tournament	2004	2005	2006	2007	2008	2009	2010	2011	2012
Australian Open	Q1	A	Q1	A	2R	1R	Q2	Q3	Q1
French Open	Q2	A	A	1R	1R	2R	1R	Q2	A
Wimbledon	Q1	A	A	A	1R	1R	1R	Q2	A
US Open	Q1	Q1	A	Q1	1R	1R	A	Q2	A

== Top 10 wins ==
#	Player	Rank	Event	Surface	Rd	Score	MKR
2009
1.	(Russia) Vera Zvonareva	No. 7	İstanbul Cup, Turkey	Hard	1R	6–2, 1–6, 6–4	No. 127
