= 2014 BRD Arad Challenger – Singles =

Singles
- 2014 BRD Arad Challenger

Final
- Champion: (Bosnia and Herzegovina) Damir Džumhur
- Runner-up: (Spain) Pere Riba
- Score: 6–4, 7–6^{(7–3)}

Events
Singles	Doubles
← 2013 ·	BRD Arad Challenger

Adrian Ungur was the defending champion, but lost in the second round to Martín Cuevas.

Damir Džumhur won the title, defeating Pere Riba in the final, 6–4, 7–6^{(7–3)}

== Seeds ==
1. (Spain) Pere Riba (final)
2. (Romania) Victor Hănescu (second round)
3. (Canada) Frank Dancevic (first round)
4. (Romania) Adrian Ungur (second round)
5. (Bosnia and Herzegovina) Damir Džumhur (champion)
6. (Austria) Gerald Melzer (second round)
7. (Argentina) Guido Andreozzi (first round)
8. (Romania) Marius Copil (first round)

== Draw ==
=== Key ===
- Q = Qualifier
- WC = Wild card
- LL = Lucky loser
- Alt = Alternate
- SE = Special exempt
- PR = Protected ranking
- ITF = ITF entry
- JE = Junior exempt
- w/o = Walkover
- r = Retired
- d = Defaulted
- SR = Special ranking

=== Finals ===
Semifinals
1	(Spain) Pere Riba	6	7
(France) Lucas Pouille	2	5
(United States) Chase Buchanan	6	0	1
5	(Bosnia and Herzegovina) Damir Džumhur	3	6	6

Final
1	(Spain) Pere Riba	4	6^{3}
5	(Bosnia and Herzegovina) Damir Džumhur	6	7^{7}

=== Top half ===
First round
1	(Spain) P Riba	6	6
(Croatia) N Mektić	2	1
PR	(United States) D Kosakowski	7	6
(Serbia) I Bozoljac	5	2
WC	(Romania) P-A Luncanu	5	6	6
Q	(Brazil) B Sant'Anna	7	4	1
Q	(Croatia) F Škugor	3	6	7^{7}
7	(Argentina) G Andreozzi	6	3	6^{3}
4	(Romania) A Ungur	6	6
(France) D Guez	4	2
WC	(Romania) V Antonescu	3	4
Q	(Uruguay) M Cuevas	6	6
(Spain) E López-Pérez	7	2	4
(France) L Pouille	5	6	6
WC	(Romania) P Ciorcilă	1	2
6	(Austria) G Melzer	6	6

Second round
1	(Spain) P Riba	6	6
PR	(United States) D Kosakowski	2	1
WC	(Romania) P-A Luncanu	6	4	6
Q	(Croatia) F Škugor	0	6	4
4	(Romania) A Ungur	3	3
Q	(Uruguay) M Cuevas	6	6
(France) L Pouille	6	6
6	(Austria) G Melzer	1	4

Quarterfinals
1	(Spain) P Riba	6	6
WC	(Romania) P-A Luncanu	2	1
Q	(Uruguay) M Cuevas	2	1
(France) L Pouille	6	6

Semifinals
1	(Spain) P Riba	6	7
(France) L Pouille	2	5

=== Bottom half ===
First round
8	(Romania) M Copil	7^{7}	4	3
Alt	(Bosnia and Herzegovina) A Šetkić	6^{2}	6	6
(Venezuela) D Souto	5	r
(United States) C Buchanan	7
(Croatia) T Androić	2	0^{r}
Q	(Serbia) N Čačić	6	1
(Croatia) A Veić	6	5	6
3	(Canada) F Dancevic	2	7	3
5	(Bosnia and Herzegovina) D Džumhur	7	3	6
(Moldova) R Albot	5	6	3
(Chile) G Lama	6	6
(Ecuador) E Gómez	2	2
(Romania) V Crivoi	4	4
(Belarus) U Ignatik	6	6
WC	(Switzerland) C Sturdza	1	2
2	(Romania) V Hănescu	6	6

Second round
Alt	(Bosnia and Herzegovina) A Šetkić	3	7^{7}	3
(United States) C Buchanan	6	6^{4}	6
Q	(Serbia) N Čačić	7^{9}	1	7
(Croatia) A Veić	6^{7}	6	5
5	(Bosnia and Herzegovina) D Džumhur	6	6
(Chile) G Lama	4	2
(Belarus) U Ignatik	6	4	6
2	(Romania) V Hănescu	1	6	4

Quarterfinals
(United States) C Buchanan	6	6
Q	(Serbia) N Čačić	3	3
5	(Bosnia and Herzegovina) D Džumhur	6	6
(Belarus) U Ignatik	4	4

Semifinals
(United States) C Buchanan	6	0	1
5	(Bosnia and Herzegovina) D Džumhur	3	6	6
