= 2012 BRD Arad Challenger – Doubles =

Doubles
- 2012 BRD Arad Challenger

Final
- Champions: (Croatia) Nikola Mektić (Croatia) Antonio Veić
- Runners-up: (Croatia) Marin Draganja (Croatia) Dino Marcan
- Score: 7–6^{(7–5)}, 4–6, [10–3]

Events
Singles	Doubles
← 2011 ·	BRD Arad Challenger	· 2013 →

Daniel Muñoz-de la Nava and Sergio Pérez-Pérez were the defending champions but decided not to participate.
Nikola Mektić and Antonio Veić won the title, defeating Marin Draganja and Dino Marcan 7–6^{(7–5)}, 4–6, [10–3] in the final.

== Seeds ==
1. (Romania) Andrei Dăescu / (Romania) Florin Mergea (semifinals)
2. (Croatia) Marin Draganja / (Croatia) Dino Marcan (final)
3. (Montenegro) Goran Tošić / (United States) Denis Zivkovic (first round)
4. (Spain) Gerard Granollers / (Spain) Javier Martí (first round)

== Draw ==
=== Key ===
- Q = Qualifier
- WC = Wild card
- LL = Lucky loser
- Alt = Alternate
- SE = Special exempt
- PR = Protected ranking
- ITF = ITF entry
- JE = Junior exempt
- w/o = Walkover
- r = Retired
- d = Defaulted
- SR = Special ranking

=== Draw ===
First round
1	(Romania) A Dăescu (Romania) F Mergea	6	6
WC	(Romania) P-A Luncanu (Romania) R Sabău	1	1
WC	(Serbia) I Bozoljac (Romania) M Copil	6^{4}	6	[10]
(Argentina) M Alund (Argentina) F Bagnis	7^{7}	3	[8]
4	(Spain) G Granollers (Spain) J Martí	4	6	[4]
(Croatia) N Mektić (Croatia) A Veić	6	3	[10]
(Italy) A Arnaboldi (Italy) G Naso	6	6
(Romania) V Crivoi (Slovakia) A Martin	1	3
(France) G Burquier (France) A Gensse	1	4
(Brazil) G Clezar (Portugal) G Elias	6	6
(France) A Michon (France) G Rufin	6	2	[12]
3	(Montenegro) G Tošić (United States) D Zivkovic	3	6	[10]
WC	(Romania) V Hănescu (Switzerland) C Sturdza	4	4
(Germany) D Brands (Austria) N Moser	6	6
Alt	(Croatia) T Androić (Serbia) B Pašanski	3	2
2	(Croatia) M Draganja (Croatia) D Marcan	6	6

Quarterfinals
1	(Romania) A Dăescu (Romania) F Mergea	6	6
WC	(Serbia) I Bozoljac (Romania) M Copil	4	4
(Croatia) N Mektić (Croatia) A Veić	6	6
(Italy) A Arnaboldi (Italy) G Naso	2	2
(Brazil) G Clezar (Portugal) G Elias	6	6
(France) A Michon (France) G Rufin	2	4
(Germany) D Brands (Austria) N Moser	5	4
2	(Croatia) M Draganja (Croatia) D Marcan	7	6

Semifinals
1	(Romania) A Dăescu (Romania) F Mergea	4	5
(Croatia) N Mektić (Croatia) A Veić	6	7
(Brazil) G Clezar (Portugal) G Elias	5	7^{7}	[9]
2	(Croatia) M Draganja (Croatia) D Marcan	7	6^{0}	[11]

Final
(Croatia) N Mektić (Croatia) A Veić	7^{7}	4	[10]
2	(Croatia) M Draganja (Croatia) D Marcan	6^{5}	6	[3]
