= 2012 BRD Arad Challenger – Singles =

Singles
- 2012 BRD Arad Challenger

Final
- Champion: (Argentina) Facundo Bagnis
- Runner-up: (Romania) Victor Hănescu
- Score: 6–4, 6–4

Events
Singles	Doubles
← 2011 ·	BRD Arad Challenger	· 2013 →

David Guez was the defending champion but decided not to participate.
Facundo Bagnis won the final against Victor Hănescu 6–4, 6–4.

== Seeds ==
1. (Germany) Daniel Brands (second round)
2. (Croatia) Antonio Veić (semifinals)
3. (France) Augustin Gensse (semifinals)
4. (Romania) Victor Hănescu (final)
5. (Argentina) Martín Alund (second round)
6. (Portugal) Gastão Elias (second round)
7. (France) Guillaume Rufin (second round)
8. (France) Nicolas Devilder (second round)

== Draw ==
=== Key ===
- Q = Qualifier
- WC = Wild card
- LL = Lucky loser
- Alt = Alternate
- SE = Special exempt
- PR = Protected ranking
- ITF = ITF entry
- JE = Junior exempt
- w/o = Walkover
- r = Retired
- d = Defaulted
- SR = Special ranking

=== Finals ===
Semifinals
(Argentina) Facundo Bagnis	7^{7}	6
3	(France) Augustin Gensse	6^{2}	2
4	(Romania) Victor Hănescu	6	6
2	(Croatia) Antonio Veić	4	2

Final
(Argentina) Facundo Bagnis	6	6
4	(Romania) Victor Hănescu	4	4

=== Top half ===
First round
1	(Germany) D Brands	6	7
WC	(Romania) F Mergea	3	5
(Slovakia) K Čapkovič	4	6	3
(Argentina) F Bagnis	6	1	6
(France) M Teixeira	1^{r}
(Belgium) Y Mertens	6
(Romania) M Copil	4	7^{7}	4
6	(Portugal) G Elias	6	6^{1}	6
3	(France) A Gensse	6	6
Q	(Croatia) D Marcan	4	3
Alt	(Slovakia) A Martin	0	4
WC	(Romania) P-A Luncanu	6	6
(Austria) M Linzer	6	6
(Hungary) A Balázs	3	0
Q	(Croatia) M Draganja	4	3
8	(France) N Devilder	6	6

Second round
1	(Germany) D Brands	5	5
(Argentina) F Bagnis	7	7
(Belgium) Y Mertens	7^{7}	6
6	(Portugal) G Elias	6^{4}	2
3	(France) A Gensse	3	6	6
WC	(Romania) P-A Luncanu	6	2	2
(Austria) M Linzer	6	6
8	(France) N Devilder	4	0

Quarterfinals
(Argentina) F Bagnis	6	6
(Belgium) Y Mertens	2	2
3	(France) A Gensse	2	6	6
(Austria) M Linzer	6	4	3

Semifinals
(Argentina) F Bagnis	7^{7}	6
3	(France) A Gensse	6^{2}	2

=== Bottom half ===
First round
5	(Argentina) M Alund	6	7^{7}
(Czech Republic) D Lojda	1	6^{2}
Q	(Croatia) T Androić	7^{7}	6
(Brazil) G Clezar	6^{5}	2
(Italy) G Naso	6	2	6
(Spain) J Martí	3	6	3
(France) A Michon	3	6^{5}
4	(Romania) V Hănescu	6	7^{7}
7	(France) G Rufin	6	6
WC	(Romania) V Crivoi	2	1
Q	(Serbia) B Pašanski	4	6	6
(Bosnia and Herzegovina) D Džumhur	6	4	3
(France) G Burquier	6	6
WC	(Switzerland) C Sturdza	0	1
(Spain) G Granollers	3	1
2	(Croatia) A Veić	6	6

Second round
5	(Argentina) M Alund	4	3
Q	(Croatia) T Androić	6	6
(Italy) G Naso	4	2
4	(Romania) V Hănescu	6	6
7	(France) G Rufin	6^{4}	6	3
Q	(Serbia) B Pašanski	7^{7}	3	6
(France) G Burquier	6	3	1
2	(Croatia) A Veić	2	6	6

Quarterfinals
Q	(Croatia) T Androić	1^{r}
4	(Romania) V Hănescu	4
Q	(Serbia) B Pašanski	7^{7}	2	2
2	(Croatia) A Veić	6^{4}	6	6

Semifinals
4	(Romania) V Hănescu	6	6
2	(Croatia) A Veić	4	2
