= 2014 BRD Arad Challenger – Doubles =

Doubles
- 2014 BRD Arad Challenger

Final
- Champions: (Croatia) Franko Škugor (Croatia) Antonio Veić
- Runners-up: (Moldova) Radu Albot (New Zealand) Artem Sitak
- Score: 6–4, 7–6^{(7–3)}

Events
Singles	Doubles
← 2013 ·	BRD Arad Challenger

Antonio Veić and Franko Škugor were the defending champions and successfully defended their title by defeating Radu Albot and Artem Sitak in the final, 6–4, 7–6^{(7–3)}.

== Seeds ==
1. (Moldova) Radu Albot / (New Zealand) Artem Sitak (final)
2. (Austria) Sebastian Bader / (Austria) Gerald Melzer (quarterfinals)
3. (Croatia) Franko Škugor / (Croatia) Antonio Veić (champion)
4. (Croatia) Toni Androić / (Croatia) Nikola Mektić (semifinals)

== Draw ==
=== Key ===
- Q = Qualifier
- WC = Wild card
- LL = Lucky loser
- Alt = Alternate
- SE = Special exempt
- PR = Protected ranking
- ITF = ITF entry
- JE = Junior exempt
- w/o = Walkover
- r = Retired
- d = Defaulted
- SR = Special ranking

=== Draw ===
First round
1	(Moldova) R Albot (New Zealand) A Sitak	6	6^{5}	[10]
WC	(Romania) M Copil (Switzerland) C Sturdza	1	7^{7}	[7]
WC	(Romania) V Crivoi (Romania) P Grigoriu	6	6^{4}	[10]
(United States) C Buchanan (Ecuador) E Gómez	1	7^{7}	[7]
4	(Croatia) T Androić (Croatia) N Mektić	6	7^{7}
(Serbia) N Ćirić (Brazil) F Neis	3	6^{2}
(Chile) G Lama (Venezuela) D Souto	4	1
(Argentina) G Andreozzi (Dominican Republic) J Hernández	6	6
(Romania) Alexandru-Daniel Carpen (Belarus) U Ignatik	7^{7}	6^{3}	[4]
(Spain) E López-Pérez (Spain) DM de la Nava	6^{4}	7^{7}	[10]
(Uruguay) M Cuevas (Spain) P Riba	7	6^{2}	[3]
3	(Croatia) F Škugor (Croatia) A Veić	5	7^{7}	[10]
(Bosnia and Herzegovina) D Džumhur (Bosnia and Herzegovina) A Šetkić	6	6
(Serbia) I Bozoljac (Serbia) N Čačić	1	4
WC	(Romania) P-A Luncanu (Romania) A Ungur	4	5
2	(Austria) S Bader (Austria) G Melzer	6	7

Quarterfinals
1	(Moldova) R Albot (New Zealand) A Sitak	6	6
WC	(Romania) V Crivoi (Romania) P Grigoriu	1	0
4	(Croatia) T Androić (Croatia) N Mektić
(Argentina) G Andreozzi (Dominican Republic) J Hernández	w/o
(Spain) E López-Pérez (Spain) DM de la Nava	4	2
3	(Croatia) F Škugor (Croatia) A Veić	6	6
(Bosnia and Herzegovina) D Džumhur (Bosnia and Herzegovina) A Šetkić	6	7
2	(Austria) S Bader (Austria) G Melzer	3	5

Semifinals
1	(Moldova) R Albot (New Zealand) A Sitak	6	6
4	(Croatia) T Androić (Croatia) N Mektić	3	4
3	(Croatia) F Škugor (Croatia) A Veić	6	6
(Bosnia and Herzegovina) D Džumhur (Bosnia and Herzegovina) A Šetkić	4	1

Final
1	(Moldova) R Albot (New Zealand) A Sitak	4	6^{3}
3	(Croatia) F Škugor (Croatia) A Veić	6	7^{7}
