= 2010 Arad Challenger – Doubles =

Doubles
- 2010 Arad Challenger

Final
- Champion: (Spain) Daniel Muñoz-de la Nava (Spain) Sergio Pérez-Pérez
- Runner-up: (Croatia) Franko Škugor (Croatia) Ivan Zovko
- Score: 6–4, 6–1

Events
Singles	Doubles
- Arad Challenger

Daniel Muñoz-de la Nava and Sergio Pérez-Pérez won the final against Franko Škugor and Ivan Zovko 6–4, 6–1.

== Seeds ==
1. (Austria) Martin Fischer / (Austria) Philipp Oswald (quarterfinals, withdrew)
2. (Ukraine) Ivan Anikanov / (Ukraine) Artem Smirnov (first round)
3. (Spain) Iñigo Cervantes-Huegun / (Spain) Carles Poch-Gradin (quarterfinals)
4. (Russia) Ilya Belyaev / (Romania) Cătălin Gârd (first round)

== Draw ==
Key

- Q = Qualifier
- WC = Wild card
- LL = Lucky loser
- Alt = Alternate
- ITF = ITF entry
- PR = Protected ranking
- SR = Special ranking
- SE = Special exempt
- JE = Junior exempt
- JR = Junior Accelerator Programme entrant
- CO = College Accelerator Programme entrant
- NG = Next Gen Accelerator Program entrant
- w/o = Walkover
- r = Retired
- d = Defaulted

=== Draw ===
First round
(Germany) D Blömke (Germany) C Paar	7	6^{2}	[6]
(Croatia) F Škugor (Croatia) I Zovko	6^{4}	7	[10]
3	(Spain) I Cervantes-Huegun (Spain) C Poch-Gradin	7	6^{4}	[10]
(Serbia) F Krajinović (Croatia) A Veić	5	7	[2]
(Romania) M Copil (Romania) V Crivoi	6	3	[10]
(New Zealand) D Turner (Germany) B Knittel	2	6	[5]
(France) A Michon (France) G Rufin	w/o
(Hungary) A Balázs (Czech Republic) D Lojda
(Spain) D Muñoz-de la Nava (Spain) S Pérez-Pérez	3	6	[10]
4	(Russia) I Belyaev (Romania) C Gârd	6	4	[2]
(Slovakia) P Červenák (Spain) G Olaso	7	7
(Romania) P Luncanu (Romania) F Mergea	6	5
(Spain) R Bautista-Agut (Spain) E Carril	6	6
2	(Ukraine) I Anikanov (Ukraine) A Smirnov	4	3

Quarterfinals
1	(Austria) M Fischer (Austria) P Oswald	w/o
(Croatia) F Škugor (Croatia) I Zovko
3	(Spain) I Cervantes-Huegun (Spain) C Poch-Gradin	6	7^{6}	[6]
(Romania) M Copil (Romania) V Crivoi	3	7	[10]
(Hungary) A Balázs (Czech Republic) D Lojda	1	1
(Spain) D Muñoz-de la Nava (Spain) S Pérez-Pérez	6	6
(Slovakia) P Červenák (Spain) G Olaso	6	6
(Spain) R Bautista-Agut (Spain) E Carril	4	4

Semifinals
(Croatia) F Škugor (Croatia) I Zovko	3	6	[10]
(Romania) M Copil (Romania) V Crivoi	6	3	[5]
(Spain) D Muñoz-de la Nava (Spain) S Pérez-Pérez	7	3	[10]
(Slovakia) P Červenák (Spain) G Olaso	6^{11}	6	[5]

Finals
(Croatia) F Škugor (Croatia) I Zovko	4	1
(Spain) D Muñoz-de la Nava (Spain) S Pérez-Pérez	6	6
