= 2014 BRD Arad Challenger =

- Date: 2–8 June
- Edition: 4th
- Draw: 32S / 16D
- Prize money: €42,000+H
- Surface: Clay
- Location: Arad, Romania

Champions

Singles
- (Bosnia and Herzegovina) Damir Džumhur

Doubles
- (Croatia) Franko Škugor / (Croatia) Antonio Veić
← 2013 ·	BRD Arad Challenger	· 2015 →

The 2014 BRD Arad Challenger was a professional tennis tournament played on clay courts. It was the third edition of the tournament which was part of the 2014 ATP Challenger Tour. It took place in Arad, Romania between 2 and 8 June 2014.

== Singles main-draw entrants ==
=== Seeds ===
Country	Player	Rank^{1}	Seed
ESP	Pere Riba	84	1
ROU	Victor Hănescu	85	2
CAN	Frank Dancevic	121	3
ROU	Adrian Ungur	128	4
BIH	Damir Džumhur	129	5
AUT	Gerald Melzer	140	6
ARG	Guido Andreozzi	148	7
ROU	Marius Copil	151	8

- ^{1} Rankings are as of May 26, 2014.

=== Other entrants ===
The following players received wildcards into the singles main draw:

- (Romania) Vasile Antonescu
- (Romania) Patrick Ciorcilă
- (Romania) Petru-Alexandru Luncanu
- (Switzerland) Constantin Sturdza

The following players received entry as alternates into the singles main draw:

- (Bosnia and Herzegovina) Aldin Šetkić

The following players used protected ranking to gain entry into the singles main draw:

- (United States) Daniel Kosakowski

The following players received entry from the qualifying draw:

- (Brazil) Bruno Sant'anna
- (Croatia) Franco Škugor
- (Uruguay) Martín Cuevas
- (Serbia) Nikola Čačić

== Doubles main-draw entrants ==
=== Seeds ===
Country	Player	Country	Player	Rank^{1}	Seed
MDA	Radu Albot	NZL	Artem Sitak	295	1
AUT	Sebastian Bader	AUT	Gerald Melzer	433	2
CRO	Franko Škugor	CRO	Antonio Veić	438	3
CRO	Toni Androić	CRO	Nikola Mektić	541	4

- ^{1} Rankings as of May 26, 2014.

=== Other entrants ===
The following pairs received wildcards into the doubles main draw:

- (Romania) Marius Copil / (Switzerland) Constantin Sturdza
- (Romania) Victor Crivoi / (Romania) Patrick Grigoriu
- (Romania) Petru-Alexandru Luncanu / (Romania) Adrian Ungur

== Champions ==
=== Singles ===
- (Bosnia and Herzegovina) Damir Džumhur def. (Spain) Pere Riba, 6–4, 7–6^{(7–3)}

=== Doubles ===
- (Croatia) Franko Škugor / (Croatia) Antonio Veić def. (Moldova) Radu Albot / (New Zealand) Artem Sitak, 6–4, 7–6^{(7–3)}
