= 2013 BRD Arad Challenger – Doubles =

Doubles
- 2013 BRD Arad Challenger

Final
- Champions: (Croatia) Antonio Veić (Croatia) Franko Škugor
- Runners-up: (Argentina) Facundo Bagnis (Colombia) Julio César Campozano
- Score: 7–6^{(7–5)}, 4–6, [11–9]

Events
Singles	Doubles
← 2012 ·	BRD Arad Challenger	· 2014 →

Nikola Mektić and Antonio Veić were the defending champions but Mektić chose to not compete
Veić chose to compete with Franko Škugor and won the title, defeating Facundo Bagnis and Julio César Campozano 7–6^{(7–5)}, 4–6, [11–9] in the final.

== Seeds ==
1. (Brazil) Guilherme Clezar / (Brazil) Fabiano de Paula (first round)
2. (Canada) Peter Polansky / (United States) Tennys Sandgren (first round)
3. (Croatia) Franko Škugor / (Croatia) Antonio Veić (champion)
4. (Austria) Gerald Melzer / (Croatia) Mate Pavić (semifinals)

== Draw ==
=== Key ===
- Q = Qualifier
- WC = Wild card
- LL = Lucky loser
- Alt = Alternate
- SE = Special exempt
- PR = Protected ranking
- ITF = ITF entry
- JE = Junior exempt
- w/o = Walkover
- r = Retired
- d = Defaulted
- SR = Special ranking

=== Draw ===
First round
1	(Brazil) G Clezar (Brazil) F de Paula	4	4
(Serbia) N Ćirić (Serbia) B Pašanski	6	6
(Moldova) R Albot (Italy) F Cipolla	7^{7}	5	[10]
(Argentina) F Bagnis (Ecuador) JC Campozano	6^{1}	7	[7]
4	(Austria) G Melzer (Croatia) M Pavić	6	6
(Republic of Ireland) J Cluskey (United Kingdom) D Walsh	3	4
(United States) B Klahn (Chinese Taipei) T-h Yang	6	6
WC	(Romania) Sebastian Krăilă (Romania) P-A Luncanu	1	0
WC	(Romania) P Ciorcilă (Romania) V Crivoi	2	6	[6]
(South Africa) J Andersen (Belgium) N Desein	6	4	[10]
WC	(Romania) Alexandru-Daniel Carpen (Romania) Dragoș Cristian Mîrtea	4	0
3	(Croatia) F Škugor (Croatia) A Veić	6	6
(United States) V Mirzadeh (United States) D Zivkovic	6	5	[8]
(Argentina) G Andreozzi (Tunisia) M Jaziri	3	7	[10]
(France) J Eysseric (France) N Renavand	7^{7}	6
2	(Canada) P Polansky (United States) T Sandgren	6^{5}	2

Quarterfinals
(Serbia) N Ćirić (Serbia) B Pašanski	3	2
(Argentina) F Bagnis (Ecuador) JC Campozano	6	6
4	(Austria) G Melzer (Croatia) M Pavić	6	4	[10]
(United States) B Klahn (Chinese Taipei) T-h Yang	3	5	[5]
(South Africa) J Andersen (Belgium) N Desein	1	2
3	(Croatia) F Škugor (Croatia) A Veić	6	6
(Argentina) G Andreozzi (Tunisia) M Jaziri	6^{7}	0
(France) J Eysseric (France) N Renavand	7^{9}	6

Semifinals
(Argentina) F Bagnis (Ecuador) JC Campozano	7	6
4	(Austria) G Melzer (Croatia) M Pavić	5	4
3	(Croatia) F Škugor (Croatia) A Veić	3	6	[11]
(France) J Eysseric (France) N Renavand	6	2	[9]

Final
(Argentina) F Bagnis (Ecuador) JC Campozano	6^{5}	6	[9]
3	(Croatia) F Škugor (Croatia) A Veić	7^{7}	4	[11]
