= 2013 BRD Arad Challenger – Singles =

Singles
- 2013 BRD Arad Challenger

Final
- Champion: (Romania) Adrian Ungur
- Runner-up: (Romania) Marius Copil
- Score: 6–4, 7–6^{(7–3)}

Events
Singles	Doubles
← 2012 ·	BRD Arad Challenger	· 2014 →

Facundo Bagnis was the defending champion but lost in the quarterfinals. Adrian Ungur won the Romanian final against Marius Copil 6–4, 7–6^{(7–3)}.

== Seeds ==
1. (Germany) Tobias Kamke (withdrew)
2. (France) Guillaume Rufin (second round)
3. (Romania) Adrian Ungur (champion)
4. (Romania) Marius Copil (final)
5. (Italy) Flavio Cipolla (first round)
6. (Tunisia) Malek Jaziri (second round)
7. (Argentina) Facundo Bagnis (quarterfinals)
8. (Argentina) Guido Andreozzi (quarterfinals)

== Draw ==
=== Key ===
- Q = Qualifier
- WC = Wild card
- LL = Lucky loser
- Alt = Alternate
- SE = Special exempt
- PR = Protected ranking
- ITF = ITF entry
- JE = Junior exempt
- w/o = Walkover
- r = Retired
- d = Defaulted
- SR = Special ranking

=== Finals ===
Semifinals
Q	(Spain) Pere Riba	6	3	5
3	(Romania) Adrian Ungur	1	6	7
4	(Romania) Marius Copil	4	7	7
(France) Jonathan Eysseric	6	5	5

Final
3	(Romania) Adrian Ungur	6	7^{7}
4	(Romania) Marius Copil	4	6^{3}

=== Top half ===
First round
LL	(Croatia) M Pavić	4	1
Q	(Spain) P Riba	6	6
(United States) B Klahn	7^{7}	3	6
(Serbia) B Pašanski	6^{5}	6	1
Q	(Croatia) F Škugor	6	6^{4}	2
(Croatia) A Veić	1	7^{7}	6
(Brazil) G Clezar	3	6^{5}
7	(Argentina) F Bagnis	6	7^{7}
3	(Romania) A Ungur	6	6
(United States) T Sandgren	2	4
(France) N Renavand	4	4
(Romania) V Crivoi	6	6
(Canada) P Polansky	7^{8}	3	4
(Moldova) R Albot	6^{6}	6	6
LL	(Switzerland) H Laaksonen	2	6	6
5	(Italy) F Cipolla	6	1	0

Second round
Q	(Spain) P Riba	6	6
(United States) B Klahn	4	4
(Croatia) A Veić	1	4
7	(Argentina) F Bagnis	6	6
3	(Romania) A Ungur	6	0	6
(Romania) V Crivoi	4	6	4
(Moldova) R Albot	6^{5}	5
LL	(Switzerland) H Laaksonen	7^{7}	7

Quarterfinals
Q	(Spain) P Riba	6	6
7	(Argentina) F Bagnis	2	2
3	(Romania) A Ungur	6	6
LL	(Switzerland) H Laaksonen	3	1

Semifinals
Q	(Spain) P Riba	6	3	5
3	(Romania) A Ungur	1	6	7

=== Bottom half ===
First round
8	(Argentina) G Andreozzi	6	6
(Belgium) N Desein	3	1
Q	(Romania) M-I Miron	2	0
(Brazil) F de Paula	6	6
WC	(Romania) P-A Luncanu	2	3
(Austria) G Melzer	6	6
WC	(Romania) P Ciorcilă	6	3^{r}
4	(Romania) M Copil	4	4
6	(Tunisia) M Jaziri	7	6
(Ecuador) JC Campozano	5	2
(Chinese Taipei) T-h Yang	6	6
WC	(Austria) Björn Probst	1	2
(France) J Eysseric	6	6
WC	(Romania) Dragoș Torge	0	1
Q	(United States) D Zivkovic	5	6	1
2	(France) G Rufin	7	4	6

Second round
8	(Argentina) G Andreozzi	6	7^{7}
(Brazil) F de Paula	1	6^{5}
(Austria) G Melzer	3	4
4	(Romania) M Copil	6	6
6	(Tunisia) M Jaziri	6	5	6^{4}
(Chinese Taipei) T-h Yang	1	7	7^{7}
(France) J Eysseric	7^{7}	6
2	(France) G Rufin	6^{1}	3

Quarterfinals
8	(Argentina) G Andreozzi	6^{1}	2
4	(Romania) M Copil	7^{7}	6
(Chinese Taipei) T-h Yang	1	6	4
(France) J Eysseric	6	2	6

Semifinals
4	(Romania) M Copil	4	7	7
(France) J Eysseric	6	5	5
