= 2012 BRD Arad Challenger =

- Date: 2–8 July
- Edition: 2nd
- Surface: Clay
- Location: Arad, Romania

Champions

Singles
- (Argentina) Facundo Bagnis

Doubles
- (Croatia) Nikola Mektić / (Croatia) Antonio Veić
← 2010 ·	BRD Arad Challenger	· 2013 →

The 2012 BRD Arad Challenger was a professional tennis tournament played on clay courts. It was the second edition of the tournament which was part of the 2012 ATP Challenger Tour. It took place in Arad, Romania between 2 and 8 July 2012.

== Singles main draw entrants ==
=== Seeds ===
Country	Player	Rank^{1}	Seed
GER	Daniel Brands	102	1
CRO	Antonio Veić	144	2
FRA	Augustin Gensse	150	3
ROU	Victor Hănescu	153	4
ARG	Martín Alund	158	5
POR	Gastão Elias	161	6
FRA	Guillaume Rufin	168	7
FRA	Nicolas Devilder	190	8

- ^{1} Rankings are as of June 25, 2012.

=== Other entrants ===
The following players received wildcards into the singles main draw:

- (Romania) Victor Crivoi
- (Romania) Petru-Alexandru Luncanu
- (Romania) Florin Mergea
- (Switzerland) Constantin Sturdza

The following players received entry as an alternate into the singles main draw:

- (Slovakia) Andrej Martin

The following players received entry from the qualifying draw:

- (Croatia) Toni Androić
- (Croatia) Marin Draganja
- (Croatia) Dino Marcan
- (Serbia) Boris Pašanski

== Champions ==
=== Singles ===
- (Argentina) Facundo Bagnis def. (Romania) Victor Hănescu, 6–4, 6–4

=== Doubles ===
- (Croatia) Nikola Mektić / (Croatia) Antonio Veić def. (Croatia) Marin Draganja / (Croatia) Dino Marcan, 7–6^{(7–5)}, 4–6, [10–3]
