= 2010 Arad Challenger – Singles =

Singles
- 2010 Arad Challenger

Final
- Champion: (France) David Guez
- Runner-up: (France) Benoît Paire
- Score: 6–3, 6–1

Events
Singles	Doubles
← 2009 ·	Arad Challenger	· 2011 →

David Guez won in the final against Benoît Paire 6–3, 6–1.

== Seeds ==
1. (France) David Guez (champion)
2. (Spain) Albert Ramos-Viñolas (second round)
3. (Austria) Martin Fischer (first round)
4. (Romania) Victor Crivoi (semifinals)
5. (Serbia) Filip Krajinović (second round)
6. (Croatia) Antonio Veić (Quarterfinal)
7. (France) Guillaume Rufin (second round)
8. (Czech Republic) Dušan Lojda (Quarterfinal)

== Draw ==
=== Key ===
- Q = Qualifier
- WC = Wild card
- LL = Lucky loser
- Alt = Alternate
- SE = Special exempt
- PR = Protected ranking
- ITF = ITF entry
- JE = Junior exempt
- w/o = Walkover
- r = Retired
- d = Defaulted
- SR = Special ranking

=== Finals ===
Semifinals
1	(France) David Guez	7	7
4	(Romania) Victor Crivoi	6^{7}	6^{6}
(France) Benoît Paire	6	6
(Spain) Daniel Muñoz-de la Nava	3	2

Final
1	(France) David Guez	6	6
(France) Benoît Paire	3	1

=== Top half ===
First round
1	(France) D Guez	1	6	6
(Belgium) Y Mertens	6	2	2
(France) V Millot	1	2
(Switzerland) M Lammer	6	6
Q	(Slovakia) M Semjan	4	6	4
(Hungary) A Balázs	6	0	6
ALT	(New Zealand) D King-Turner	0	1
6	(Croatia) A Veić	6	6
4	(Romania) V Crivoi	3	6	6
(Spain) G Olaso	6	2	1
(Spain) R Bautista-Agut	1	6^{3}
Q	(Croatia) F Škugor	6	7
(Slovakia) P Červenák	6	6
WC	(Romania) C Gârd	2	0
(Argentina) M Argüello	6	5	4
5	(Serbia) F Krajinović	2	7	6

Second round
1	(France) D Guez	6	6
(Switzerland) M Lammer	3	2
(Hungary) A Balázs	4	6	5
6	(Croatia) A Veić	6	3	7
4	(Romania) V Crivoi	3	7	7
Q	(Croatia) F Škugor	6	6^{4}	5
(Slovakia) P Červenák	6	6^{5}	6
5	(Serbia) F Krajinović	2	7	2

Quarterfinals
1	(France) D Guez	6	6
6	(Croatia) A Veić	3	3
4	(Romania) V Crivoi	6	6
(Slovakia) P Červenák	4	3

Semifinals
1	(France) D Guez	7	7
4	(Romania) V Crivoi	6^{7}	6^{6}

=== Bottom half ===
First round
7	(France) G Rufin	6	7
(France) J Dasnières de Veigy	2	5
(Austria) P Oswald	4	4
(France) B Paire	6	6
Q	(Germany) D Blömke	6	6
WC	(Romania) V-A Ghilea	0	2
Q	(Serbia) B Pašanski	6	7
3	(Austria) M Fischer	4	6^{3}
8	(Czech Republic) D Lojda	6	6
(Brazil) R Hocevar	4	4
WC	(Romania) M Copil	4	3
(Spain) I Cervantes-Huegun	6	6
(Germany) B Knittel	1	4
(Spain) D Muñoz-de la Nava	6	6
WC	(Romania) P-A Luncanu	4	2
2	(Spain) A Ramos-Viñolas	6	6

Second round
7	(France) G Rufin	7	5	4
(France) B Paire	5	7	6
Q	(Germany) D Blömke	3	6^{5}
Q	(Serbia) B Pašanski	6	7
8	(Czech Republic) D Lojda	6	6^{5}	7
(Spain) I Cervantes-Huegun	2	7	5
(Spain) D Muñoz-de la Nava	6	6
2	(Spain) A Ramos-Viñolas	2	3

Quarterfinals
(France) B Paire	6	6^{6}	6
Q	(Serbia) B Pašanski	3	7	3
8	(Czech Republic) D Lojda	4	0
(Spain) D Muñoz-de la Nava	6	6

Semifinals
(France) B Paire	6	6
(Spain) D Muñoz-de la Nava	3	2
