= 2013 BRD Arad Challenger =

- Date: 3–9 June
- Edition: 3rd
- Draw: 32S / 16D
- Prize money: €42,000+H
- Surface: Clay
- Location: Arad, Romania

Champions

Singles
- (Romania) Adrian Ungur

Doubles
- (Croatia) Franko Škugor / (Croatia) Antonio Veić
← 2012 ·	BRD Arad Challenger	· 2014 →

The 2013 BRD Arad Challenger was a professional tennis tournament played on clay courts. It was the third edition of the tournament which was part of the 2013 ATP Challenger Tour. It took place in Arad, Romania between 3 and 9 June 2013.

== Singles main draw entrants ==
=== Seeds ===
Country	Player	Rank^{1}	Seed
GER	Tobias Kamke	72	1
FRA	Guillaume Rufin	98	2
ROU	Adrian Ungur	106	3
ROU	Marius Copil	134	4
ITA	Flavio Cipolla	138	5
TUN	Malek Jaziri	158	6
ARG	Facundo Bagnis	165	7
ARG	Guido Andreozzi	167	8

- ^{1} Rankings are as of May 27, 2013.

=== Other entrants ===
The following players received wildcards into the singles main draw:

- (Romania) Patrick Ciorcilă
- (Romania) Petru-Alexandru Luncanu
- (Austria) Björn Probst
- (Romania) Dragoș Torge

The following players received entry from the qualifying draw:

- (Romania) Marcel-Ioan Miron
- (Spain) Pere Riba
- (Croatia) Franko Škugor
- (United States) Denis Zivkovic

The following players received entry as lucky losers:

- (Switzerland) Henri Laaksonen
- (Croatia) Mate Pavić

== Doubles main draw entrants ==
=== Seeds ===
Country	Player	Country	Player	Rank^{1}	Seed
BRA	Guilherme Clezar	BRA	Fabiano de Paula	349	1
CAN	Peter Polansky	USA	Tennys Sandgren	356	2
CRO	Franko Škugor	CRO	Antonio Veić	360	3
AUT	Gerald Melzer	CRO	Mate Pavić	371	4

- ^{1} Rankings as of May 27, 2013.

=== Other entrants ===
The following pairs received wildcards into the doubles main draw:

- (Romania) Alexandru-Daniel Carpen / (Romania) Dragoș Cristian Mirtea
- (Romania) Patrick Ciorcilă / (Romania) Victor Crivoi
- (Romania) Sebastian Krăilă / (Romania) Petru-Alexandru Luncanu

== Champions ==
=== Singles ===
- (Romania) Adrian Ungur def. (Romania) Marius Copil, 6–4, 7–6^{(7–3)}

=== Doubles ===
- (Croatia) Franko Škugor / (Croatia) Antonio Veić def. (Argentina) Facundo Bagnis / (Ecuador) Julio César Campozano, 7–6^{(7–5)},4–6, [11–9]
