= 2010 Arad Challenger =

- Date: June 28 – July 4
- Edition: 1st
- Location: Arad, Romania

Champions

Singles
- (France) David Guez

Doubles
- (Spain) Daniel Muñoz-De La Nava / (Spain) Sergio Pérez-Pérez
- Arad Challenger

The 2010 Arad Challenger was a professional tennis tournament played on outdoor red clay courts. This was the first edition of the tournament which is part of the 2010 ATP Challenger Tour. It took place in Arad, Romania between 28 June and 4 July 2010.

== ATP entrants ==
=== Seeds ===
Nationality	Player	Ranking*	Seeding
FRA	David Guez	136	1
ESP	Albert Ramos-Viñolas	140	2
AUT	Martin Fischer	164	3
ROU	Victor Crivoi	168	4
SRB	Filip Krajinović	170	5
CRO	Antonio Veić	177	6
FRA	Guillaume Rufin	184	7
CZE	Dušan Lojda	195	8

- Rankings are as of June 21, 2010.

=== Other entrants ===
The following players received wildcards into the singles main draw:

- (Romania) Marius Copil
- (Romania) Cătălin Gârd
- (Romania) Vasile-Alexandru Ghilea
- (Romania) Petru-Alexandru Luncanu

The following player received entry as an alternative:

- (New Zealand) Daniel King-Turner

The following players received entry from the qualifying draw:

- (Germany) Dennis Blömke
- (Serbia) Boris Pašanski
- (Slovakia) Marek Semjan
- (Croatia) Franko Škugor

== Champions ==
=== Singles ===
(France) David Guez def. (France) Benoît Paire, 6–3, 6–1

=== Doubles ===
(Spain) Daniel Muñoz-De La Nava / (Spain) Sergio Pérez-Pérez def. (Croatia) Franko Škugor / (Croatia) Ivan Zovko, 6–4, 6–1
