= 2011 French Open – Men's singles qualifying =

Men's singles qualifying
- 2011 French Open

Events
Singles	men	women		boys	girls
Doubles	men	women	mixed	boys	girls
WC Singles	men	women	quad
WC Doubles	men	women	quad
Legends	−45	45+	women

Qualification
Singles	men	women
- French Open

The men's qualifying rounds of the 2011 French Open tennis tournament took the form of sixteen three-round knock-out events, each with eight entrants.

== Seeds ==
1. (United States) Alex Bogomolov Jr. (qualifying competition, lucky loser)
2. (Argentina) Horacio Zeballos (first round)
3. (Germany) Matthias Bachinger (first round)
4. (Ukraine) Illya Marchenko (second round)
5. (Germany) Denis Gremelmayr (qualified)
6. (Czech Republic) Jaroslav Pospíšil (second round)
7. (Argentina) Diego Junqueira (first round)
8. (Netherlands) Thomas Schoorel (qualified)
9. (United States) Bobby Reynolds (first round)
10. (Japan) Tatsuma Ito (first round)
11. (Poland) Łukasz Kubot (qualified)
12. (Czech Republic) Lukáš Rosol (qualified)
13. (France) Éric Prodon (qualified)
14. (Netherlands) Jesse Huta Galung (first round)
15. (Slovakia) Lukáš Lacko (first round)
16. (Spain) Albert Ramos (qualified)
17. (Germany) Andreas Beck (qualifying competition, lucky loser)
18. (United States) Ryan Harrison (qualifying competition, lucky loser)
19. (Colombia) Alejandro Falla (qualified)
20. (Luxembourg) Gilles Müller (second round)
21. (Turkey) Marsel İlhan (qualifying competition, retired, lucky loser)
22. (Brazil) João Souza (second round)
23. (Italy) Simone Bolelli (qualifying competition, lucky loser)
24. (France) Marc Gicquel (qualifying competition, lucky loser)
25. (Italy) Paolo Lorenzi (second round)
26. (Belgium) Steve Darcis (qualified)
27. (Germany) Simon Greul (qualifying competition)
28. (Czech Republic) Ivo Minář (qualifying competition)
29. (South Africa) Izak van der Merwe (second round)
30. (Austria) Martin Fischer (first round)
31. (France) Stéphane Robert (qualified)
32. (Chile) Paul Capdeville (second round)

== Qualifiers ==
1. (Belgium) Steve Darcis
2. (Croatia) Antonio Veić
3. (Argentina) Leonardo Mayer
4. (France) Stéphane Robert
5. (Germany) Denis Gremelmayr
6. (Spain) Javier Martí
7. (Colombia) Alejandro Falla
8. (Netherlands) Thomas Schoorel
9. (Germany) Björn Phau
10. (France) Augustin Gensse
11. (Poland) Łukasz Kubot
12. (Czech Republic) Lukáš Rosol
13. (France) Éric Prodon
14. (France) David Guez
15. (Canada) Frank Dancevic
16. (Spain) Albert Ramos

== Lucky losers ==
1. (Germany) Andreas Beck
2. (United States) Alex Bogomolov Jr.
3. (Turkey) Marsel İlhan
4. (Italy) Simone Bolelli
5. (France) Marc Gicquel
6. (United States) Ryan Harrison

== Qualifying draw ==
Key

- Q = Qualifier
- WC = Wild card
- LL = Lucky loser
- Alt = Alternate
- ITF = ITF entry
- PR = Protected ranking
- SR = Special ranking
- SE = Special exempt
- JE = Junior exempt
- JR = Junior Accelerator Programme entrant
- CO = College Accelerator Programme entrant
- NG = Next Gen Accelerator Program entrant
- w/o = Walkover
- r = Retired
- d = Defaulted

=== First qualifier ===
First round
1	(United States) Alex Bogomolov Jr.	6	2	9
(Brazil) Ricardo Hocevar	3	6	7
(Slovakia) Ivo Klec	3	6^{5}
(South Africa) Rik de Voest	6	7^{7}
(France) Grégoire Burquier	6^{3}	6^{3}
(Brazil) Rogério Dutra da Silva	7^{7}	7^{7}
PR	(Monaco) Jean-René Lisnard	7^{10}	5	7
26	(Belgium) Steve Darcis	6^{8}	7	9

Second round
1	(United States) Alex Bogomolov Jr.	6	1	6
(South Africa) Rik de Voest	0	6	4
(Brazil) Rogério Dutra da Silva	6	2	1
26	(Belgium) Steve Darcis	4	6	6

Qualifying competition
1	(United States) Alex Bogomolov Jr.	1	3
26	(Belgium) Steve Darcis	6	6

=== Second qualifier ===
First round
2	(Argentina) Horacio Zeballos	6^{6}	6^{12}
(Croatia) Antonio Veić	7^{8}	7^{14}
(Argentina) Facundo Bagnis	6	6
(France) Kenny de Schepper	3	3
(Russia) Evgeny Donskoy	3
(Brazil) Thiago Alves	2^{r}
(Italy) Simone Vagnozzi	6	3	1
23	(Italy) Simone Bolelli	1	6	6

Second round
(Croatia) Antonio Veić	6	2	6
(Argentina) Facundo Bagnis	3	6	2
(Russia) Evgeny Donskoy	3	5
23	(Italy) Simone Bolelli	6	7

Qualifying competition
(Croatia) Antonio Veić	6	3	7
23	(Italy) Simone Bolelli	1	6	5

=== Third qualifier ===
First round
3	(Germany) Matthias Bachinger	5	6	7
(France) Laurent Rochette	7	1	9
(Czech Republic) Jan Hernych	6	3	6
(Argentina) Andrés Molteni	1	6	0
(Spain) Guillermo Olaso	3	3
(Colombia) Juan Sebastián Cabal	6	6
(Argentina) Leonardo Mayer	6	6
30	(Austria) Martin Fischer	4	3

Second round
(France) Laurent Rochette	7^{7}	3	3
(Czech Republic) Jan Hernych	6^{4}	6	6
(Colombia) Juan Sebastián Cabal	1	2
(Argentina) Leonardo Mayer	6	6

Qualifying competition
(Czech Republic) Jan Hernych	7	2	3
(Argentina) Leonardo Mayer	5	6	6

=== Fourth qualifier ===
First round
4	(Ukraine) Illya Marchenko	7^{7}	6
(Kazakhstan) Evgeny Korolev	6^{4}	1
(United States) Alex Kuznetsov	3	4
(Russia) Andrey Kuznetsov	6	6
(Colombia) Robert Farah	6	6
WC	(France) Gianni Mina	4	2
(Germany) Simon Stadler	3	3
31	(France) Stéphane Robert	6	6

Second round
4	(Ukraine) Illya Marchenko	7	3	3
(Russia) Andrey Kuznetsov	5	6	6
(Colombia) Robert Farah	1	3
31	(France) Stéphane Robert	6	6

Qualifying competition
(Russia) Andrey Kuznetsov	5	7^{10}	2
31	(France) Stéphane Robert	7	6^{8}	6

=== Fifth qualifier ===
First round
5	(Germany) Denis Gremelmayr	7	3	6
(Poland) Jerzy Janowicz	5	6	4
(Argentina) Juan Pablo Brzezicki	4	6^{5}
WC	(France) Charles-Antoine Brézac	6	7^{7}
WC	(France) Romain Jouan	6	7
(Australia) James Lemke	1	5
WC	(France) Axel Michon	3	5
25	(Italy) Paolo Lorenzi	6	7

Second round
5	(Germany) Denis Gremelmayr	6	6
WC	(France) Charles-Antoine Brézac	4	4
WC	(France) Romain Jouan	7	4	6
25	(Italy) Paolo Lorenzi	5	6	4

Qualifying competition
5	(Germany) Denis Gremelmayr	3	6	7
WC	(France) Romain Jouan	6	3	5

=== Sixth qualifier ===
First round
6	(Czech Republic) Jaroslav Pospíšil	6	7^{8}
(France) Olivier Patience	3	6^{6}
(Spain) Javier Martí	4	7^{7}	6
(Slovakia) Andrej Martin	6	6^{2}	3
(Spain) Daniel Muñoz de la Nava	6	6
(Belarus) Uladzimir Ignatik	3	1
(United Kingdom) James Ward	7^{8}	5	2
18	(United States) Ryan Harrison	6^{6}	7	6

Second round
6	(Czech Republic) Jaroslav Pospíšil	6	3	3
(Spain) Javier Martí	4	6	6
(Spain) Daniel Muñoz de la Nava	7^{7}	4	6
18	(United States) Ryan Harrison	6^{0}	6	8

Qualifying competition
(Spain) Javier Martí	6	7^{7}
18	(United States) Ryan Harrison	2	6^{5}

=== Seventh qualifier ===
First round
7	(Argentina) Diego Junqueira	3	6^{5}
(Germany) Dominik Meffert	6	7^{7}
(Italy) Alessio di Mauro	7^{7}	6
(Argentina) José Acasuso	6^{4}	1
(Ecuador) Giovanni Lapentti	2	2
(Germany) Sebastian Rieschick	6	6
WC	(France) Jonathan Eysseric	3	7^{7}	4
19	(Colombia) Alejandro Falla	6	6^{4}	6

Second round
(Germany) Dominik Meffert	2	5
(Italy) Alessio di Mauro	6	7
(Germany) Sebastian Rieschick	6	4	5
19	(Colombia) Alejandro Falla	1	6	7

Qualifying competition
(Italy) Alessio di Mauro	5	6	1
19	(Colombia) Alejandro Falla	7	4	6

=== Eighth qualifier ===
First round
8	(Netherlands) Thomas Schoorel	6	6
(Australia) Chris Guccione	4	4
(Czech Republic) Dušan Lojda	2	3
(Denmark) Frederik Nielsen	6	6
(Chile) Jorge Aguilar	7^{7}	6
(Spain) Guillermo Alcaide	6^{5}	2
(Hungary) Attila Balázs	3	3
22	(Brazil) João Souza	6	6

Second round
8	(Netherlands) Thomas Schoorel	6	6
(Denmark) Frederik Nielsen	2	3
(Chile) Jorge Aguilar	6	6^{2}	6
22	(Brazil) João Souza	4	7^{7}	3

Qualifying competition
8	(Netherlands) Thomas Schoorel	6	7^{7}
(Chile) Jorge Aguilar	4	6^{1}

=== Ninth qualifier ===
First round
9	(United States) Bobby Reynolds	3	2
(Germany) Björn Phau	6	6
(Colombia) Carlos Salamanca	6	3	6
(Spain) Iván Navarro	3	6	3
(Argentina) Sebastián Decoud	7^{7}	6
(Russia) Konstantin Kravchuk	6^{4}	2
(Kazakhstan) Yuri Schukin	6	2	1
28	(Czech Republic) Ivo Minář	4	6	6

Second round
(Germany) Björn Phau	6	6
(Colombia) Carlos Salamanca	3	3
(Argentina) Sebastián Decoud	6^{2}	2
28	(Czech Republic) Ivo Minář	7^{7}	6

Qualifying competition
(Germany) Björn Phau	1	6	6
28	(Czech Republic) Ivo Minář	6	4	4

=== Tenth qualifier ===
First round
10	(Japan) Tatsuma Ito	6^{4}	1
(France) Augustin Gensse	7^{7}	6
(Spain) Roberto Bautista-Agut	6	6
(Germany) Alexander Flock	4	3
(Australia) Marinko Matosevic	6	6
(France) Josselin Ouanna	4	3
(Republic of Ireland) Conor Niland	6^{6}	3
21	(Turkey) Marsel İlhan	7^{8}	6

Second round
(France) Augustin Gensse	6	5	7
(Spain) Roberto Bautista-Agut	3	7	5
(Australia) Marinko Matosevic	2	3
21	(Turkey) Marsel İlhan	6	6

Qualifying competition
(France) Augustin Gensse	6	4
21	(Turkey) Marsel İlhan	4	0^{r}

=== Eleventh qualifier ===
First round
11	(Poland) Łukasz Kubot	6^{3}	6	6
(Canada) Peter Polansky	7^{7}	1	0
WC	(France) Albano Olivetti	7^{8}	3	8
(Brazil) Júlio Silva	6^{6}	6	10
(Germany) Cedrik-Marcel Stebe	6	7^{7}
PR	(Bosnia and Herzegovina) Amer Delić	4	6^{2}
(Italy) Matteo Viola	6	0	5
27	(Germany) Simon Greul	2	6	7

Second round
11	(Poland) Łukasz Kubot	6	6
(Brazil) Júlio Silva	4	1
(Germany) Cedrik-Marcel Stebe	4	0
27	(Germany) Simon Greul	6	6

Qualifying competition
11	(Poland) Łukasz Kubot	2	7	6
27	(Germany) Simon Greul	6	5	1

=== Twelfth qualifier ===
First round
12	(Czech Republic) Lukáš Rosol	6	6
(Brazil) Fernando Romboli	1	1
(Switzerland) Marco Chiudinelli	4	4
(Romania) Marius Copil	6	6
(Italy) Flavio Cipolla	6^{6}	1
(Romania) Adrian Ungur	7^{7}	6
(Slovenia) Grega Žemlja	4	4
24	(France) Marc Gicquel	6	6

Second round
12	(Czech Republic) Lukáš Rosol	4	6	6
(Romania) Marius Copil	6	3	4
(Romania) Adrian Ungur	6	6^{8}	2
24	(France) Marc Gicquel	3	7^{10}	6

Qualifying competition
12	(Czech Republic) Lukáš Rosol	7	6
24	(France) Marc Gicquel	5	1

=== Thirteenth qualifier ===
First round
13	(France) Éric Prodon	6	6
(Australia) Carsten Ball	2	4
(Dominican Republic) Víctor Estrella	2	6	1
WC	(Argentina) Agustín Velotti	6	3	6
(Serbia) Ilija Bozoljac	3	2
(Switzerland) Stéphane Bohli	6	6
WC	(France) Nicolas Devilder	6^{2}	7^{7}	3
17	(Germany) Andreas Beck	7^{7}	6^{5}	6

Second round
13	(France) Éric Prodon	6	6
WC	(Argentina) Agustín Velotti	4	2
(Switzerland) Stéphane Bohli	6^{3}	4
17	(Germany) Andreas Beck	7^{7}	6

Qualifying competition
13	(France) Éric Prodon	6	7^{7}
17	(Germany) Andreas Beck	4	6^{5}

=== Fourteenth qualifier ===
First round
14	(Netherlands) Jesse Huta Galung	4	7^{7}	10
(Serbia) Nikola Ćirić	6	6^{3}	12
(Slovakia) Marek Semjan	3	5
(Croatia) Franko Škugor	6	7
(Italy) Marco Crugnola	7^{7}	4	1
(France) David Guez	6^{2}	6	6
(Estonia) Jürgen Zopp	1	6^{3}
29	(South Africa) Izak van der Merwe	6	7^{7}

Second round
(Serbia) Nikola Ćirić	3	3
(Croatia) Franko Škugor	6	2^{r}
(France) David Guez	6	5	6
29	(South Africa) Izak van der Merwe	2	7	0

Qualifying competition
(Serbia) Nikola Ćirić	7^{8}	2	2
(France) David Guez	6^{6}	6	6

=== Fifteenth qualifier ===
First round
15	(Slovakia) Lukáš Lacko	2	2
(Canada) Frank Dancevic	6	6
(Belgium) Ruben Bemelmans	4	2
(Argentina) Eduardo Schwank	6	6
(Russia) Alexandre Kudryavtsev	3	1
(Romania) Victor Crivoi	6	6
(United States) Jesse Witten	3	7^{7}	3
20	(Luxembourg) Gilles Müller	6	6^{3}	6

Second round
(Canada) Frank Dancevic	7^{7}	7^{7}
(Argentina) Eduardo Schwank	6^{3}	6^{5}
(Romania) Victor Crivoi	6^{1}	7	7
20	(Luxembourg) Gilles Müller	7^{7}	6^{5}	5

Qualifying competition
(Canada) Frank Dancevic	6	6
(Romania) Victor Crivoi	1	3

=== Sixteenth qualifier ===
First round
16	(Spain) Albert Ramos	4	7	6
(Australia) Peter Luczak	6	5	4
(Argentina) Federico Delbonis	6	6
(Morocco) Reda El Amrani	3	4
(Netherlands) Igor Sijsling	3	4
(Germany) Bastian Knittel	6	6
WC	(France) Pierre-Hugues Herbert	3	6	3
32	(Chile) Paul Capdeville	6	3	6

Second round
16	(Spain) Albert Ramos	4	6	6
(Argentina) Federico Delbonis	6	1	2
(Germany) Bastian Knittel	6	6
32	(Chile) Paul Capdeville	4	4

Qualifying competition
16	(Spain) Albert Ramos	6	6
(Germany) Bastian Knittel	4	3
