= Ivan Zovko =

Croatian tennis player

- Country (sports): Croatia
- Residence: Croatia
- Born: 9 May 1988 (age 36); SR Croatia, SFR Yugoslavia
- Plays: Right-handed (two-handed backhand)
- Prize money: US$28, 650

Singles
- Career record: 0–0
- Career titles: 0
- Highest ranking: No. 1084 (15 June 2009)
- Current ranking: NR

Doubles
- Career record: 0–4
- Career titles: 0
- Highest ranking: No. 216 (31 January 2011)
- Last updated on: November 29, 2010.

Ivan Zovko (born 9 May 1988) is a Croatian tennis player playing on the ATP Challenger Tour. He specialises in doubles. On 1 November 2010, he reached his highest ATP doubles ranking of 220.

== Challenger finals ==
=== Doubles: 3 (1–2) ===
Legend
ATP Challenger Tour (1–2)

Outcome	No.	Date (Final)	Tournament	Surface	Partner	Opponents in the final	Score
Runner-up	1.	4 July 2010	Arad, Romania	Clay	(Croatia) Franko Škugor	(Spain) Daniel Muñoz-de la Nava (Spain) Sergio Pérez-Pérez	4–6, 1–6
Runner-up	2.	25 July 2010	Orbetello, Italy	Clay	(Croatia) Nikola Mektić	(Italy) Alessio di Mauro (Italy) Alessandro Motti	2–6, 6–3, [3–10]
Winner	3.	25 September 2010	Ljubljana, Slovenia	Clay	(Croatia) Nikola Mektić	(Croatia) Marin Draganja (Croatia) Dino Marcan	3–6, 6–0, [10–3]
