= Sergio Pérez Pérez =

Spanish tennis player (born 1984)

- Country (sports): Spain
- Born: 23 July 1984 (age 40)
- Plays: Right-handed
- Prize money: US$33,906

Singles
- Career record: 0–0
- Career titles: 0
- Highest ranking: No. 614 (June 23, 2008)
- Current ranking: NR (October 17, 2011)

Doubles
- Career record: 0–1
- Career titles: 0
- Highest ranking: No. 357 (April 14, 2008)
- Current ranking: No. 1119 (October 17, 2011)
- Last updated on: October 17, 2011.

Sergio Pérez Pérez (b. Madrid, 23 July 1984) is a Spanish tennis player playing on the ATP Challenger Tour. He has won one Challenger title, in doubles. He has played in one ATP World Tour main draw match, also in doubles.

On June 23, 2008, Pérez Pérez reached his highest ATP singles ranking of World No. 614, whilst his highest doubles ranking of 357 was reached on April 14, 2008. He is the younger brother of Spanish tennis player Luis Antonio Pérez Pérez.

== Challenger finals ==
Legend
ATP Challenger Tour (1–0)

=== Doubles: 1 (1–0) ===
Outcome	No.	Date	Tournament	Surface	Partner	Opponents in the final	Score
Winners	1.	4 July 2010	Arad, Romania	Clay	(Spain) Daniel Muñoz de la Nava	(Croatia) Franko Škugor (Croatia) Ivan Zovko	6–4, 6–1
