= Axel Michon =

French tennis player

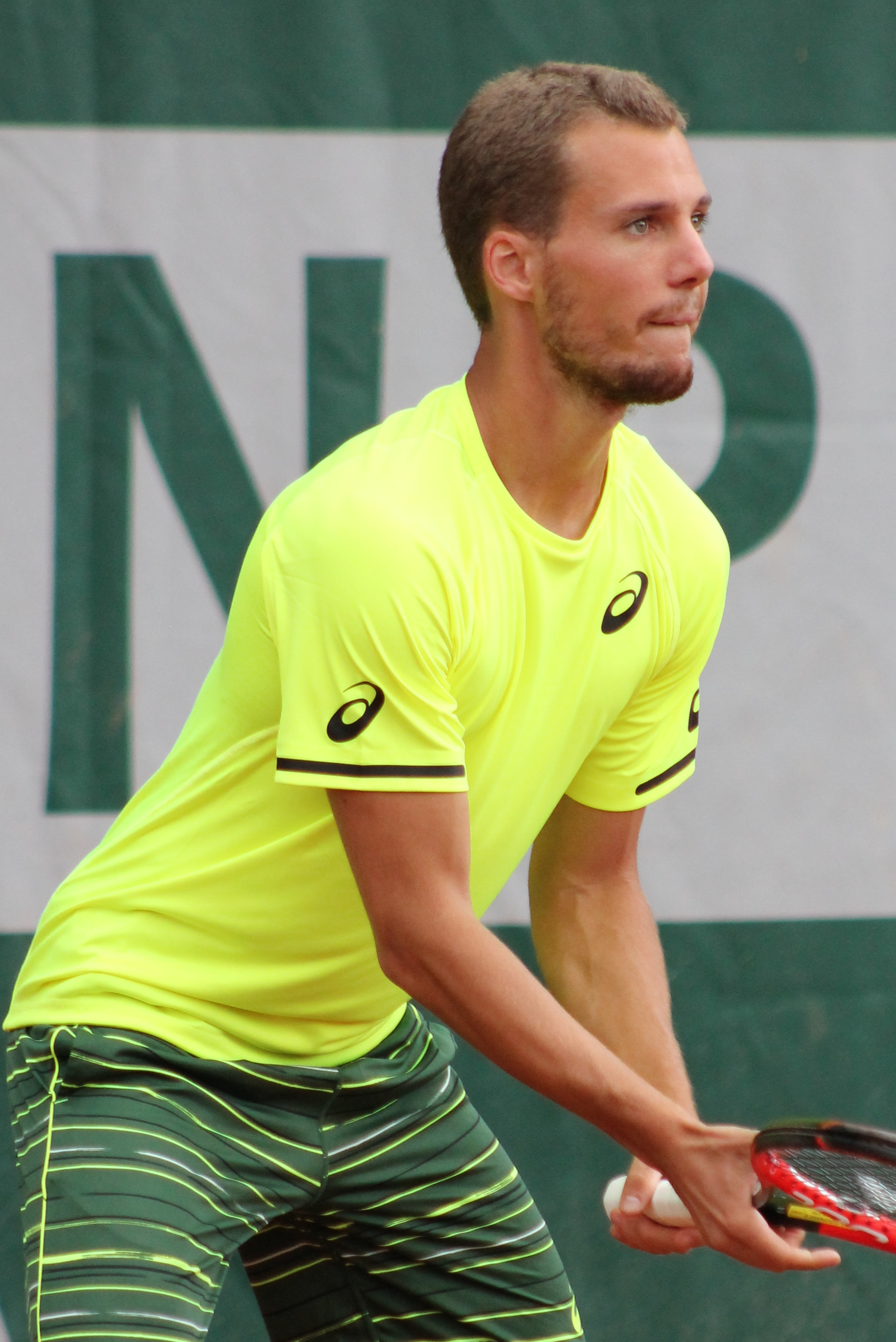
- Michon at the Stade Roland Garros in Paris (XVI^{e})
- Country (sports): France
- Residence: Paris, France
- Born: 16 December 1990 (age 35) Paris, France
- Height: 1.76 m (5 ft 9 1/2 in)
- Turned pro: 2009
- Plays: Left-handed (two-handed backhand)
- Coach: Jérôme Portier; Aloïs Beust
- Prize money: $345,577

Singles
- Career record: 1–1
- Career titles: 0
- Highest ranking: No. 177 (14 July 2014)

Grand Slam singles results
- Australian Open: Q2 (2014, 2015)
- French Open: 2R (2014)
- Wimbledon: Q2 (2016)
- US Open: Q1 (2014)

Doubles
- Career record: 0–2
- Career titles: 0
- Highest ranking: No. 379 (10 August 2015)

Grand Slam doubles results
- French Open: 1R (2015)

Axel Michon (born 16 December 1990) is a French professional tennis player.

== Professional career ==
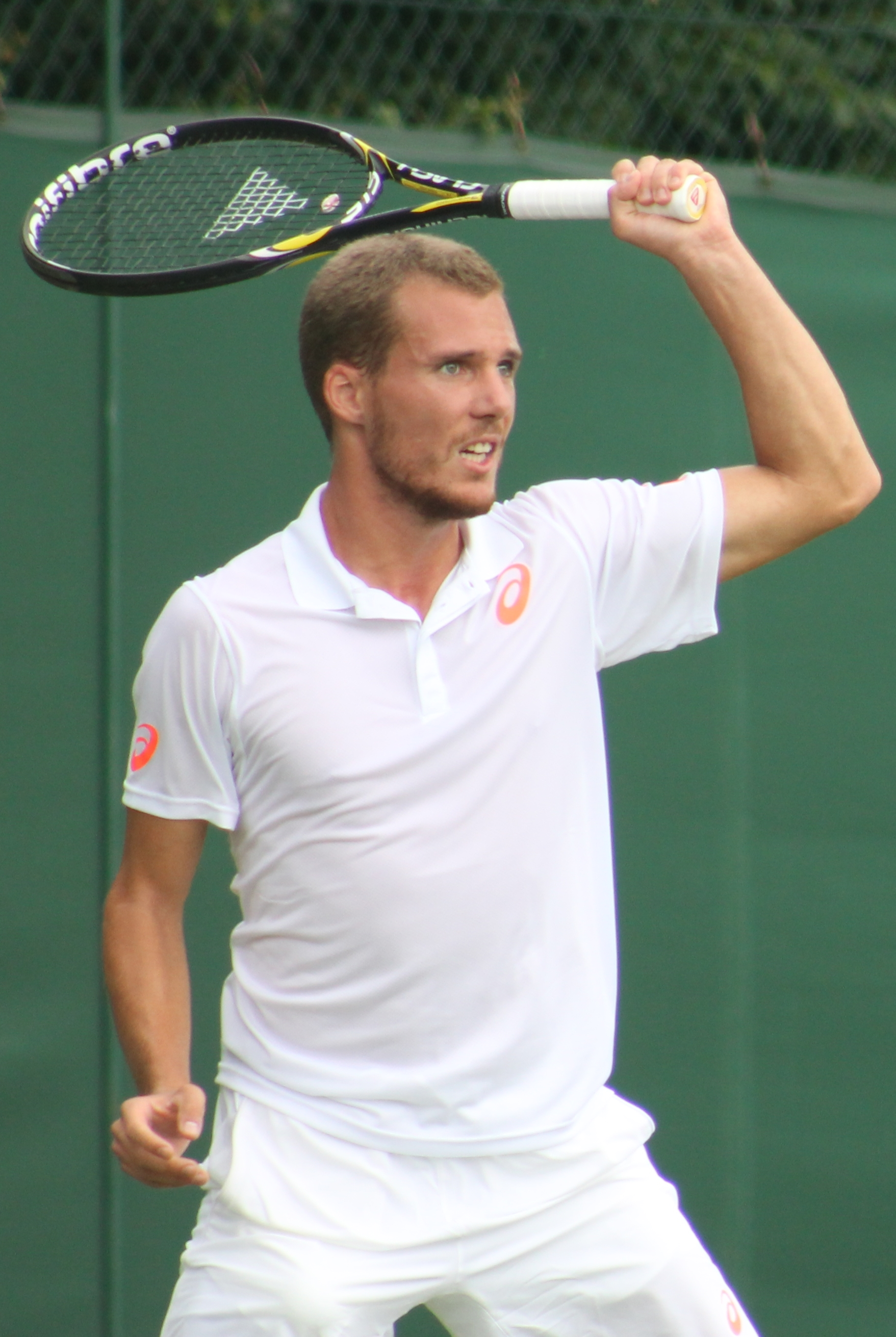
Michon, 2014

=== 2014 ===
Axel lost in the second round of qualifying at the Australian Open. He made his first appearance in the main draw of a Grand Slam event at the French Open, where he received a wildcard. He won his first round match against Bradley Klahn, before losing in the second round against 19th seed Kevin Anderson in straight sets.

== ATP Challengers and ITF Futures finals ==
=== Singles (15 titles, 11 runners-up) ===
Legend
ATP Challengers (0–0)
ITF Futures (15–11)

Outcome	No.	Date	Tournament	Surface	Opponent	Score
Runner-up	1.	14 September 2009	Claremont, USA	Hard	(United States) Matt Bocko	6–7^{(4–7)}, 3–6
Runner-up	2.	11 March 2013	Calabasas, USA	Hard	(India) Sanam Singh	3–6, 6–1, 6–7^{(3–7)}
Winner	1.	18 March 2013	Costa Mesa, USA	Hard	(South Korea) Min-Hyeok Cho	6–3, 6–3

=== Doubles (1 title, 3 runners-up) ===
Legend
ATP Challengers (0–1)
ITF Futures (1–2)

Outcome	No.	Date	Tournament	Surface	Partner	Opponent	Score

== Singles performance timeline ==
Key
W	F	SF	QF	#R	RR	Q#	P#	DNQ	A	Z#	PO	G	S	B	NMS	NTI	P	NH

(W) winner; (F) finalist; (SF) semifinalist; (QF) quarterfinalist; (#R) rounds 4, 3, 2, 1; (RR) round-robin stage; (Q#) qualification round; (P#) preliminary round; (DNQ) did not qualify; (A) absent; (Z#) Davis/Fed Cup Zonal Group (with number indication) or (PO) play-off; (G) gold, (S) silver or (B) bronze Olympic/Paralympic medal; (NMS) not a Masters tournament; (NTI) not a Tier I tournament; (P) postponed; (NH) not held; (SR) strike rate (events won / competed); (W–L) win–loss record.
To avoid confusion and double counting, these charts are updated at the conclusion of a tournament or when the player's participation has ended.

Note: Only results from the Grand Slams, ATP World Tour Masters 1000, ATP World Tour Finals, Summer Olympics and Davis Cup are listed in an ATP player's performance timeline. Qualifying matches and walkovers are neither official match wins nor losses. This table is current through the 2015 US Open.

Tournament	2009	2010	2011	2012	2013	2014	2015	2016	W–L	Win %
Grand Slam tournaments
Australian Open	A	A	A	Q1	A	Q2	Q2		0–0	0%
French Open	Q1	A	Q1	Q3	Q2	2R	A		1–1	50%
Wimbledon	A	A	A	A	A	Q1	A		0–0	0%
US Open	A	A	Q1	A	A	Q1	A		0–0	0%
Win–loss	0–0	0–0	0–0	0–0	0–0	1–1	0–0	0–0	1–1	50%
ATP World Tour Masters 1000
Paris	A	A	A	A	A	Q1	A		0–0	0%
Win–loss	0–0	0–0	0–0	0–0	0–0	0–0	0–0	0–0	0–0	0%
Career statistics
	2009	2010	2011	2012	2013	2014	2015	2016	W–L	Win %
Overall win–loss	0–0	0–0	0–0	0–0	0–0	1–1	0–0	0–0	1–1	50%
Win %	0%	0%	0%	0%	0%	50%	0%	0%	50.00%	
Year-End ranking	623	412	263	384	239	208	283		$235,198	
