= Vasile Antonescu =

Romanian tennis player

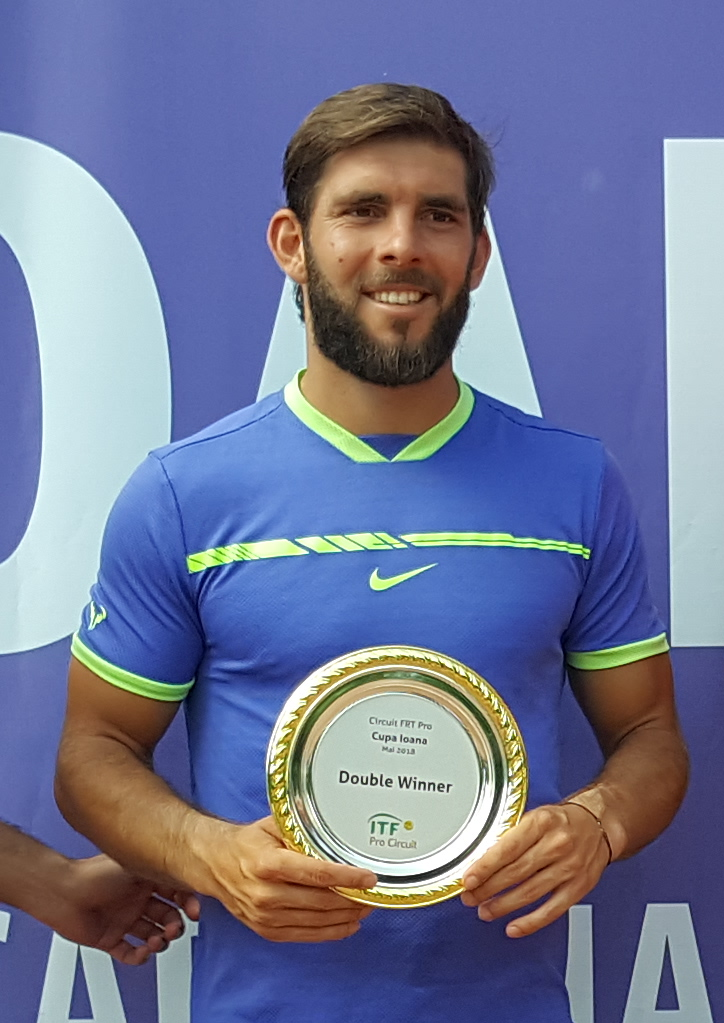
- Vasile Antonescu in 2018
- Country (sports): Romania
- Born: 24 March 1990 (age 34); Constanța, Romania
- Plays: Right-handed (two-handed backhand)
- Prize money: $45,894

Singles
- Career record: 0–0 (at ATP Tour level, Grand Slam level, and in Davis Cup)
- Career titles: 0
- Highest ranking: No. 465 (18 May 2015)
- Current ranking: No. 651 (23 October 2017)

Doubles
- Career record: 0–0 (at ATP Tour level, Grand Slam level, and in Davis Cup)
- Career titles: 0
- Highest ranking: No. 433 (23 October 2017)
- Current ranking: No. 433 (23 October 2017)
- Last updated on: 27 October 2017.

Vasile Antonescu (born 24 March 1990) is a Romanian professional tennis player.

Antonescu has a career high ATP singles ranking of 465 achieved on 18 May 2015. He also has a career high ATP doubles ranking of 433 achieved on 23 October 2017.

Antonescu represents Romania at the Davis Cup and will make his debut on 28 October 2017 playing doubles with Bogdan Borza against Israel's doubles pair consisting of Jonathan Erlich and Dudi Sela in 2nd round play-offs of Group I.
