= Constantin Sturdza =

Swiss tennis player

Constantin Studrza
- Country (sports): Switzerland
- Born: 24 August 1989 (age 36)
- Prize money: $5,030

Singles
- Career record: 0–0 (at ATP Tour level, Grand Slam level, and in Davis Cup)
- Career titles: 0

Doubles
- Career record: 0–1 (at ATP Tour level, Grand Slam level, and in Davis Cup)
- Career titles: 0
- Highest ranking: No. 1190 (28 September 2015)
- Last updated on: 27 November 2016.

Constantin Sturdza (born 24 August 1989) is a Swiss tennis player. He is the member of Sturdza family.

Sturdza has a career high ATP doubles ranking of 1190 achieved on 28 September 2015.

Sturdza made his ATP main draw debut at the 2016 Geneva Open in the doubles draw partnering Victor Hănescu.
