= Franko Škugor =

Croatian tennis player

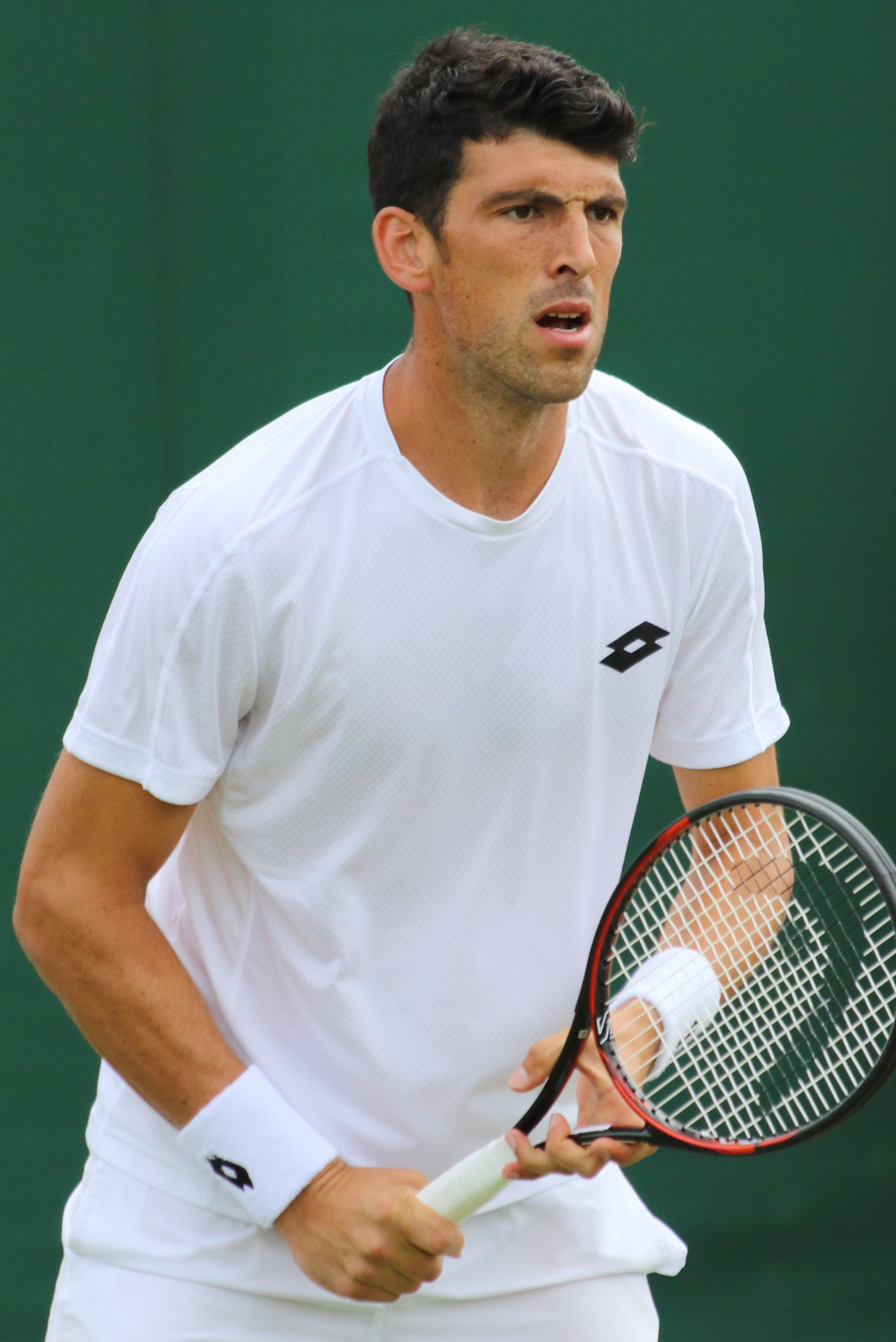
- Country (sports): Croatia
- Residence: Zagreb, Croatia
- Born: 20 September 1987 (age 38) Šibenik, SR Croatia, SFR Yugoslavia
- Height: 1.96 m (6 ft 5 in)
- Retired: 2023 (last match played)
- Plays: Right-handed (two-handed backhand)
- Coach: Alan Marić
- Prize money: US $1,698,783

Singles
- Career record: 8–23
- Career titles: 0
- Highest ranking: No. 145 (25 April 2016)

Grand Slam singles results
- Australian Open: Q2 (2011)
- French Open: Q2 (2011, 2012)
- Wimbledon: 1R (2016)
- US Open: Q2 (2008, 2010)

Doubles
- Career record: 110–118
- Career titles: 6
- Highest ranking: No. 17 (22 April 2019)

Grand Slam doubles results
- Australian Open: 3R (2020)
- French Open: QF (2021)
- Wimbledon: SF (2017, 2018)
- US Open: 3R (2018)

Mixed doubles

Grand Slam mixed doubles results
- Australian Open: 2R (2018)
- French Open: 2R (2018)
- Wimbledon: QF (2019)
- US Open: QF (2018, 2022)

Team competitions
- Davis Cup: W (2018)

Franko Škugor (Croatian pronunciation: [frâŋko ʃkûɡor]; born 20 September 1987) is a Croatian tennis coach and a former professional player who mainly competed on the ATP Challenger Tour and specialized in doubles. He has a career-high ATP doubles ranking of World No. 17 achieved on 22 April 2019. Škugor was best known for his very powerful serve up to 230 km/h (140 mph) along with very strong groundstrokes. He won the 2019 Monte-Carlo Masters with fellow Croatian Nikola Mektić.

With Mektić, Škugor also reached the doubles semifinals at the 2017 Wimbledon Championships and with Brit Dominic Inglot the semifinals of the 2018 Wimbledon Championships.

In November 2019, following the departure of Željko Krajan, Škugor captained the Croatia Davis Cup team at the 2019 Davis Cup.

Škugor is a member of Hrvatski Teniski Klub (HTK) Zagreb, his staff included Alan Marić (coach), Jurica Stančić (fitness coach) and Velibor Viboh (physiotherapist).

== Performance timeline ==
Key
W	F	SF	QF	#R	RR	Q#	DNQ	A	NH

(W) winner; (F) finalist; (SF) semifinalist; (QF) quarterfinalist; (#R) rounds 4, 3, 2, 1; (RR) round-robin stage; (Q#) qualification round; (DNQ) did not qualify; (A) absent; (NH) not held; (SR) strike rate (events won / competed); (W–L) win–loss record.
To avoid confusion and double counting, these charts are updated at the conclusion of a tournament or when the player's participation has ended.

=== Singles ===
Tournament	2008	2009	2010	2011	2012	…	2015	2016	2017	2018	2019	W–L
Grand Slam tournaments
Australian; Open	A	A	A	Q2	A	A	A	Q1	Q1	A	A	0–0
French; Open	A	A	A	Q2	Q2	A	A	Q1	A	A	A	0–0
Wimbledon	A	A	A	Q1	Q1	A	A	1R	A	A	A	0–1
US Open	Q2	A	Q2	A	Q1	A	A	Q1	A	A	A	0–0
Win–loss	0–0	0–0	0–0	0–0	0–0	0–0	0–0	0–1	0–0	0–0	0–0	0–1
National representation
Davis Cup	A	A	A	A	A	A	PO	F	1R	A	A	1–3
Career statistics
Total W–L	0–1	0–0	3–3	0–3	0–0	0–0	0–1	1–5	2–5	2–4	0–1	8–23
YE ranking	417	546	182	310	802	(Note: YE rankings 2013,2014: 543,616)	182	215	294	357	706	26%

=== Doubles ===
Tournament	2005	2006	2007	2008	2009	2010	2011	2012	2013	2014	2015	2016	2017	2018	2019	2020	2021	2022	2023	SR	W–L
Grand Slam tournaments
Australian Open	A	A	A	A	A	A	A	A	A	A	A	A	A	2R	2R	3R	A	1R	A	0 / 4	4–4
French Open	A	A	A	A	A	A	A	A	A	A	A	A	A	1R	1R	2R	QF	1R	A	0 / 5	3–5
Wimbledon	A	A	A	A	A	A	A	A	A	Q1	A	Q1	SF	SF	3R	NH	A	1R	A	0 / 4	10–4
US Open	A	A	A	A	A	A	A	A	A	A	A	A	1R	3R	2R	1R	A	1R	A	0 / 5	3–5
Win–loss	0–0	0–0	0–0	0–0	0–0	0–0	0–0	0–0	0–0	0–0	0–0	0–0	4–2	7–4	4–4	3–3	2–1	0–4	0–0	0 / 18	20–18
ATP World Tour Masters 1000
Indian Wells Masters	A	A	A	A	A	A	A	A	A	A	A	A	A	1R	QF	NH	A	A	A	0 / 2	2–2
Miami Open	A	A	A	A	A	A	A	A	A	A	A	A	A	1R	2R	NH	1R	A	A	0 / 3	1–3
Monte-Carlo Masters	A	A	A	A	A	A	A	A	A	A	A	A	A	A	W	NH	A	A	A	1 / 1	5–0
Madrid Open	A	A	A	A	A	A	A	A	A	A	A	A	A	2R	2R	NH	A	A	A	0 / 2	2–2
Italian Open	A	A	A	A	A	A	A	A	A	A	A	A	A	A	2R	1R	2R	2R	A	0 / 4	3–3
Canadian Open	A	A	A	A	A	A	A	A	A	A	A	A	A	A	1R	NH	A	A	A	0 / 1	0–1
Cincinnati Masters	A	A	A	A	A	A	A	A	A	A	A	A	A	A	1R	1R	A	A	A	0 / 2	0–2
Shanghai Masters	Not held				A	A	A	A	A	A	A	A	A	2R	1R	Not held			A	0 / 2	1–2
Paris Masters	A	A	A	A	A	A	A	A	A	A	A	A	A	2R	1R	2R	A	A	A	0 / 3	2–3
Win–loss	0–0	0–0	0–0	0–0	0–0	0–0	0–0	0–0	0–0	0–0	0–0	0–0	0–0	3–5	10–8	1–3	1–2	1–0	0–0	1 / 20	16–18
National representation
Davis Cup	A	A	A	A	A	A	A	A	A	A	PO	F	1R	A	A	F		A	A	0 / 3	2–2
Career statistics
	2005	2006	2007	2008	2009	2010	2011	2012	2013	2014	2015	2016	2017	2018	2019	2020	2021	2022	2023	Career	
Titles / Finals	0 / 0	0 / 0	0 / 0	0 / 0	0 / 0	0 / 0	0 / 0	0 / 0	0 / 0	0 / 1	0 / 0	0 / 0	0 / 1	3 / 3	2 / 3	1 / 1	0 / 0	0 / 0	0 / 0	6 / 9	
Overall win–loss	0–1	0–0	0–0	0–2	1–1	0–2	0–0	1–2	1–3	4–3	2–2	5–3	11–9	31–25	25–26	16–13	6–12	7–14	0–0	110–118	
Year-end ranking	1081	790	522	924	438	435	524	248	111	122	144	107	42	28	35	30	53	151	172	48%	

== Significant finals ==
=== Masters 1000 finals ===
==== Doubles: 1 (1 title) ====
Outcome	Year	Championship	Surface	Partner	Opponents	Score
Win	2019	Monte-Carlo Masters	Clay	(Croatia) Nikola Mektić	(Netherlands) Robin Haase (Netherlands) Wesley Koolhof	6–7^{(3–7)}, 7–6^{(7–3)}, [11–9]

== ATP career finals ==
=== Doubles: 9 (6 titles, 3 runner-ups) ===
Legend Grand Slam tournaments (0–0) ATP World Tour Finals (0–0) ATP World Tour Masters 1000 (1–0) ATP World Tour 500 Series (1–1) ATP World Tour 250 Series (4–2)	Finals by surface Hard (1–1) Clay (4–2) Grass (1–0)	Finals by setting Outdoor (5–3) Indoor (1–0)

Result	W–L	Date	Tournament	Tier	Surface	Partner	Opponents	Score
Loss	0–1	Jul 2014	Croatia Open, Croatia	250 Series	Clay	(Serbia) Dušan Lajović	(Czech Republic) František Čermák (Czech Republic) Lukáš Rosol	4–6, 6–7^{(5–7)}
Loss	0–2	Jul 2017	Swiss Open, Switzerland	250 Series	Clay	(France) Jonathan Eysseric	(Austria) Oliver Marach (Austria) Philipp Oswald	3–6, 6–4, [8–10]
Win	1–2	Apr 2018	Hungarian Open, Hungary	250 Series	Clay	(United Kingdom) Dominic Inglot	(Netherlands) Matwé Middelkoop (Argentina) Andrés Molteni	6–7^{(8–10)}, 6–1, [10–8]
Win	2–2	Jun 2018	Rosmalen Championships, Netherlands	250 Series	Grass	(United Kingdom) Dominic Inglot	(South Africa) Raven Klaasen (New Zealand) Michael Venus	7–6^{(7–3)}, 7–5
Win	3–2	Oct 2018	Swiss Indoors, Switzerland	500 Series	Hard (i)	(United Kingdom) Dominic Inglot	(Germany) Alexander Zverev (Germany) Mischa Zverev	6–2, 7–5
Win	4–2	Apr 2019	Grand Prix Hassan II, Morocco	250 Series	Clay	(Austria) Jürgen Melzer	(Netherlands) Matwé Middelkoop (Denmark) Frederik Nielsen	6–4, 7–6^{(8–6)}
Win	5–2	Apr 2019	Monte-Carlo Masters, Monaco	Masters 1000	Clay	(Croatia) Nikola Mektić	(Netherlands) Robin Haase (Netherlands) Wesley Koolhof	6–7^{(3–7)}, 7–6^{(7–3)}, [11–9]
Loss	5–3	Oct 2019	Japan Open, Japan	500 Series	Hard	(Croatia) Nikola Mektić	(France) Nicolas Mahut (France) Édouard Roger-Vasselin	6–7^{(7–9)}, 4–6
Win	6–3	Sep 2020	Austrian Open Kitzbühel, Austria	250 Series	Clay	(United States) Austin Krajicek	(Spain) Marcel Granollers (Argentina) Horacio Zeballos	7–6^{(7–5)}, 7–5

== Team competition finals: 1 (1 runner-up) ==
Outcome	No.	Date	Tournament	Surface	Partners	Opponents	Score
Runner-up	1.	25–27 November 2016	Davis Cup, Zagreb, Croatia	Hard (i)	(Croatia) Marin Čilić (Croatia) Ivo Karlović (Croatia) Ivan Dodig	(Argentina) Juan Martín del Potro (Argentina) Federico Delbonis (Argentina) Leonardo Mayer (Argentina) Guido Pella	2–3

== ATP Challenger and ITF Futures finals ==
=== Singles: 7 (7–0) ===
Legend ATP Challenger (2–0) ITF Futures (5–0)	Finals by surface Hard (3–0) Clay (4–0) Grass (0–0) Carpet (0–0)

Result	W–L	Date	Tournament	Tier	Surface	Opponent	Score
Win	1–0	Dec 2006	Tunisia F6, Hammam Sousse	Futures	Hard	(Netherlands) Michel Koning	6–3, 6–1
Win	2–0	Feb 2008	Croatia F1, Zagreb	Futures	Hard	(Slovakia) Martin Kližan	6–3, 6–2
Win	3–0	Nov 2009	Brazil F25, Porto Alegre	Futures	Clay	(Brazil) Guilherme Clezar	6–1, 7–6^{(7–5)}
Win	4–0	May 2010	Bosnia & Herzegovina F6, Prijedor	Futures	Clay	(Netherlands) Miliaan Niesten	6–3, 6–4
Win	5–0	Aug 2010	Beijing, China	Challenger	Hard	(France) Laurent Recouderc	3–6, 6–4, 6–3
Win	6–0	May 2015	Anning, China	Challenger	Clay	(Australia) Gavin Van Peperzeel	7–5, 6–2
Win	7–0	May 2015	Bosnia & Herzegovina F2, Prijedor	Futures	Clay	(Slovenia) Tomislav Ternar	6–4, 7–6^{(7–4)}

=== Doubles: 42 (17–25) ===
Legend ATP Challenger (13–18) ITF Futures (4–7)	Finals by surface Hard (4–11) Clay (12–14) Grass (0–0) Carpet (1–0)

Result	W–L	Date	Tournament	Tier	Surface	Partner	Opponents	Score
Loss	0–1	Mar 2006	Portugal F2, Lagos	Futures	Hard	(Germany) Sebastian Fitz	(Portugal) Rui Machado (Spain) Marcel Granollers	1–6, 1–6
Loss	0–2	Apr 2006	Portugal F3, Albufeira	Futures	Hard	(Germany) Sebastian Fitz	(Portugal) Fred Gil (Portugal) Gonçalo Nicau	2–6, 2–6
Loss	0–3	Jun 2006	Slovenia F2, Maribor	Futures	Clay	(Croatia) Vilim Visak	(Spain) Jordi Marse-Vidri (Spain) P Santos González	6–7^{(3–7)},6–7^{(5–7)}
Loss	0–4	Oct 2006	Mexico F19, Monterrey	Futures	Hard	(Switzerland) Alexander Sadecky	(United Kingdom) Simon Childs (Iceland) Arnar Sigurdsson	6–7^{(4–7)}, 3–6
Win	1–4	Mar 2007	Portugal F3, Albufeira	Futures	Hard	(Canada) Pierre-Ludovic Duclos	(Spain) S Pérez Pérez (Spain) L-A Perez-Perez	6–1, 6–0
Loss	1–5	Oct 2007	Portugal F5, Espinho	Futures	Clay	(Spain) Guillermo Olaso	(Australia) Andrew Coelho (Finland) Timo Nieminen	3–6, 6–3, [3–10]
Win	2–5	Nov 2009	Brazil F25, Porto Alegre	Futures	Clay	(Brazil) Diego Matos	(Argentina) Juan-Pablo Amado (Brazil) R-A Grilli	7–5, 3–6, [10–6]
Win	3–5	May 2010	Boania & Herzegovina F6, Prijedor	Futures	Clay	(Croatia) Toni Androić	(Croatia) Ivan Zovko (Croatia) Nikola Mektić	4–6, 6–3, [10–2]
Loss	3–6	Jun 2010	Italy F12, Mestre	Futures	Clay	(Serbia) Nikola Ćirić	(Italy) Walter Trusendi (Italy) Matteo Viola	7–6^{(10–8)}, 1–6, [2–10]
Loss	3–7	Jul 2010	Arad, Romania	Challenger	Clay	(Croatia) Ivan Zovko	(Spain) D M dela Nava (Spain) S Pérez Pérez	4–6, 1–6
Loss	3–8	May 2011	Zagreb, Croatia	Challenger	Clay	(Croatia) Mate Pavić	(Spain) D M dela Nava (Spain) R Ramírez Hidalgo	2–6, 6–7^{(10–12)}
Loss	3–9	Sep 2012	Trnava, Slovakia	Challenger	Clay	(Croatia) Mate Pavić	(Serbia) Nikola Ćirić (Montenegro) Goran Tošić	6–7^{(0–7)}, 5–7,
Loss	3–10	Nov 2012	Montevideo, Uruguay	Challenger	Clay	(Slovenia) Blaž Kavčič	(Croatia) Nikola Mektić (Croatia) Antonio Veić	3–6, 7–5, [7–10]
Win	4–10	Jan 2013	USA F1, Plantation	Futures	Clay	(Portugal) Pedro Sousa	(Portugal) Joao Domingues (Burundi) H Ndayishimiye	6–2, 6–3
Win	5–10	Jan 2013	Bucamaranga, Colombia	Challenger	Clay	(Brazil) Marcelo Demoliner	(Peru) Sergio Galdós (Brazil) Marco Trungelliti	7–6^{(10–8)}, 6–2
Loss	5–11	Feb 2013	Croatia F1, Zagreb	Futures	Hard	(Croatia) Joško Topić	(Croatia) Toni Androić (Croatia) Dino Marcan	3–6, 3–6
Win	6–11	Jun 2013	Arad, Romania	Challenger	Clay	(Croatia) Antonio Veić	(Argentina) Facundo Bagnis (Ecuador) J C Campozano	7–6^{(7–5)}, 4–6, [11–9]
Win	7–11	Aug 2013	Cardenons, Italy	Challenger	Clay	(Croatia) Marin Draganja	(Slovakia) Norbert Gombos (Czech Republic) Roman Jebavý	6–4, 6–4
Loss	7–12	Sep 2013	Orleans, France	Challenger	Hard	(Lithuania) Ričardas Berankis	(Ukraine) Illya Marchenko (Ukraine) Sergiy Stakhovsky	5–7, 3–6
Loss	7–13	Apr 2014	Sarasota, United States	Challenger	Clay	(Spain) Rubén Ramírez Hidalgo	(Finland) Henri Kontinen (Croatia) Marin Draganja	5–7, 7–5, [6–10]
Win	8–13	Jun 2014	Arad, Romania	Challenger	Clay	(Croatia) Antonio Veić	(Moldova) Radu Albot (New Zealand) Artem Sitak	6–4, 7–6^{(7–3)}
Win	9–13	Jun 2014	Marburg, Germany	Challenger	Clay	(Czech Republic) Jaroslav Pospíšil	(Argentina) Diego Schwartzman (Argentina) Horacio Zeballos	6–4, 6–4
Loss	9–14	Aug 2014	San Marino Challenger, San Marino	Challenger	Clay	(Romania) Adrian Ungur	(Moldova) Radu Albot (Spain) E Lopez Perez	4–6, 1–6
Loss	9–15	Jun 2015	Fergana, Uzbekistan	Challenger	Hard	(Ukraine) Denys Molchanov	(Belarus) Sergey Betov (Russia) Mikhail Elgin	3–6, 5–7
Loss	9–16	Jul 2015	Braunschweig, Germany	Challenger	Clay	(Bosnia and Herzegovina) Damir Džumhur	(Belarus) Sergey Betov (Russia) Mikhail Elgin	6–3, 1–6, [5–10]
Loss	9–17	Oct 2015	Ningbo, China	Challenger	Hard	(Croatia) Nikola Mektić	(Israel) Dudi Sela (Israel) Amir Weintraub	3–6, 6–3, [6–10]
Loss	9–18	Nov 2015	Kobe, Japan	Challenger	Hard	(Chinese Taipei) Chen Ti	(Thailand) Sanchai Ratiwatana (Thailand) Sonchat Ratiwatana	4–6, 6–2, [9–11]
Loss	9–19	Feb 2016	Santo Domingo, Dominican Republic	Challenger	Clay	(France) Jonathan Eysseric	(Uruguay) Ariel Behar (Ecuador) Giovanni Lapentti	5–7, 4–6
Loss	9–20	Jun 2016	Lyon, France	Challenger	Clay	(France) Jonathan Eysseric	(France) Grégoire Barrère (France) Tristan Lamasine	6–2, 3–6, [6–10]
Win	10–20	Aug 2016	Gatineau, Canada	Challenger	Hard	(France) Tristan Lamasine	(Australia) Jarryd Chaplin (Australia) John-Patrick Smith	6–3, 6–1
Win	11–20	Oct 2016	Orleans, France	Challenger	Hard	(Croatia) Nikola Mektić	(Uruguay) Ariel Behar (Belarus) Andrei Vasilevski	6–2, 7–5
Loss	11–21	Feb 2017	Budapest, Hungary	Challenger	Hard	(Slovenia) Blaž Kavčič	(Croatia) Dino Marcan (Austria) T-S Weissborn	3–6, 6–3, [14–16]
Win	12–21	Apr 2017	Sophia Antipolis, France	Challenger	Clay	(France) Tristan Lamasine	(Belarus) Uladzimir Ignatik (Slovakia) Jozef Kovalík	6–2, 6–2
Win	13–21	Apr 2017	Taipei, Taiwan	Challenger	Carpet	(Switzerland) Marco Chiudinelli	(Thailand) Sanchai Ratiwatana (Thailand) Sonchat Ratiwatana	4–6, 6–2, [10–5]
Win	14–21	May 2017	Ostrava, Czech Republic	Challenger	Clay	(India) Jeevan Nedunchezhiyan	(Australia) Rameez Junaid (Czech Republic) Lukáš Rosol	6–3, 6–2
Loss	14–22	Jun 2017	Caltanissetta, Italy	Challenger	Clay	(Ukraine) Denys Molchanov	(United States) Max Schnur (United States) James Cerretani	3–6, 6–3, [6–10]
Loss	14–23	Aug 2017	Portorož, Slovenia	Challenger	Hard	(Czech Republic) Lukáš Rosol	(Chile) Hans Podlipnik Castillo (Belarus) Andrei Vasilevski	3–6, 6–7^{(4–7)}
Loss	14–24	Sep 2017	Bogotá, Colombia	Challenger	Clay	(Croatia) Nikola Mektić	(El Salvador) Marcelo Arévalo (Mexico) M A Reyes-Varela	3–6, 6–3, [6–10]
Win	15–24	Feb 2023	Rovereto, Italy	Challenger 75	Hard (i)	(Romania) Victor Vlad Cornea	(Ukraine) Vladyslav Manafov (Ukraine) Oleg Prihodko	6–7^{(3–7)}, 6–2, [10–4]
Loss	15–25	Mar 2023	Biel/Bienne, Switzerland	Challenger 100	Hard (i)	(Romania) Victor Vlad Cornea	(Germany) Constantin Frantzen (Germany) Hendrik Jebens	2–6, 4–6
Win	16–25	Mar 2023	Sanremo, Italy	Challenger 125	Clay	(Romania) Victor Vlad Cornea	(Serbia) Nikola Ćaćić (Brazil) Marcelo Demoliner	6–2, 6–3
Win	17–25	Apr 2023	Oeiras, Portugal	Challenger 125	Clay	(Romania) Victor Vlad Cornea	(Brazil) Marcelo Demoliner (Italy) Andrea Vavassori	7–6^{(7–2)}, 7–6^{(7–4)}
