= Patrick Ciorcilă =

Romanian tennis player

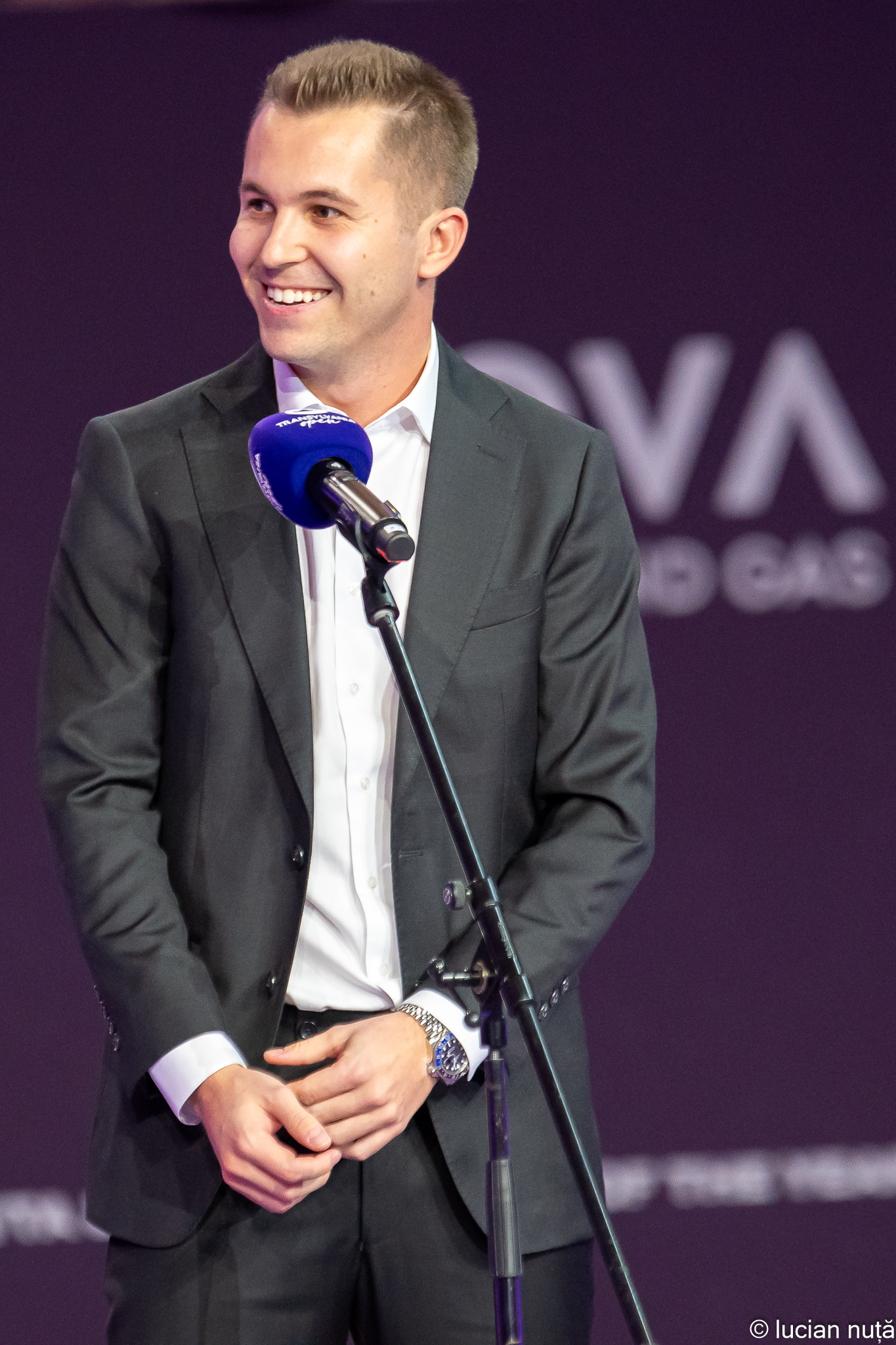
- Country (sports): Romania
- Residence: Cluj-Napoca, Romania
- Born: 20 September 1996 (age 29) Cluj-Napoca, Romania
- Height: 1.80 m (5 ft 11 in)
- Plays: Right-handed
- Prize money: $21,406

Singles
- Highest ranking: No. 534 (17 March 2014)

Doubles
- Highest ranking: No. 1035 (29 July 2013)

Patrick Ciorcilă (born 20 September 1996) is a Romanian tennis player mainly playing challengers and futures. In April 2014 he played in an ATP 250 tournament but lost in the first round. His coach is Bogdan Nițescu.
