= BRD Arad Challenger =

- 2014 BRD Arad Challenger

Defunct tennis tournament
- Location: Arad, Romania
- Venue: Activ Club
- Category: ATP Challenger Tour
- Surface: Clay
- Draw: 32S/32Q/16D
- Prize money: €30,000+H

The BRD Arad Challenger was a tennis tournament held in Arad, Romania from 2010 until 2014. After a successful first edition in 2010, the tournament was not held in 2011 due to lack of sponsors. In early 2012 it was announced that BRD – Groupe Société Générale will sponsor the tournament and thus the event was renamed to include the sponsor name. The event was part of the ATP Challenger Tour and was played on outdoor clay courts.

== Past finals ==
=== Singles ===
Year	Champion	Runner-up	Score
2014	(Bosnia and Herzegovina) Damir Džumhur	(Spain) Pere Riba	6–4, 7–6^{(7–3)}
2013	(Romania) Adrian Ungur	(Romania) Marius Copil	6–4, 7–6^{(7–3)}
2012	(Argentina) Facundo Bagnis	(Romania) Victor Hănescu	6–4, 6–4
2011	Not Held		
2010	(France) David Guez	(France) Benoît Paire	6–3, 6–1

=== Doubles ===
Year	Champions	Runners-up	Score
2014	(Croatia) Franko Škugor (Croatia) Antonio Veić	(Moldova) Radu Albot (New Zealand) Artem Sitak	6–4, 7–6^{(7–3)}
2013	(Croatia) Franko Škugor (Croatia) Antonio Veić	(Argentina) Facundo Bagnis (Ecuador) Julio César Campozano	7–6^{(7–5)},4–6, [11–9]
2012	(Croatia) Nikola Mektić (Croatia) Antonio Veić	(Croatia) Marin Draganja (Croatia) Dino Marcan	7–6^{(7–5)}, 4–6, [10–3]
2011	Not Held		
2010	(Spain) Daniel Muñoz de la Nava (Spain) Sergio Pérez-Pérez	(Croatia) Franko Škugor (Croatia) Ivan Zovko	6–4, 6–1
