= Toni Androić =

Croatian tennis player (born 1991)

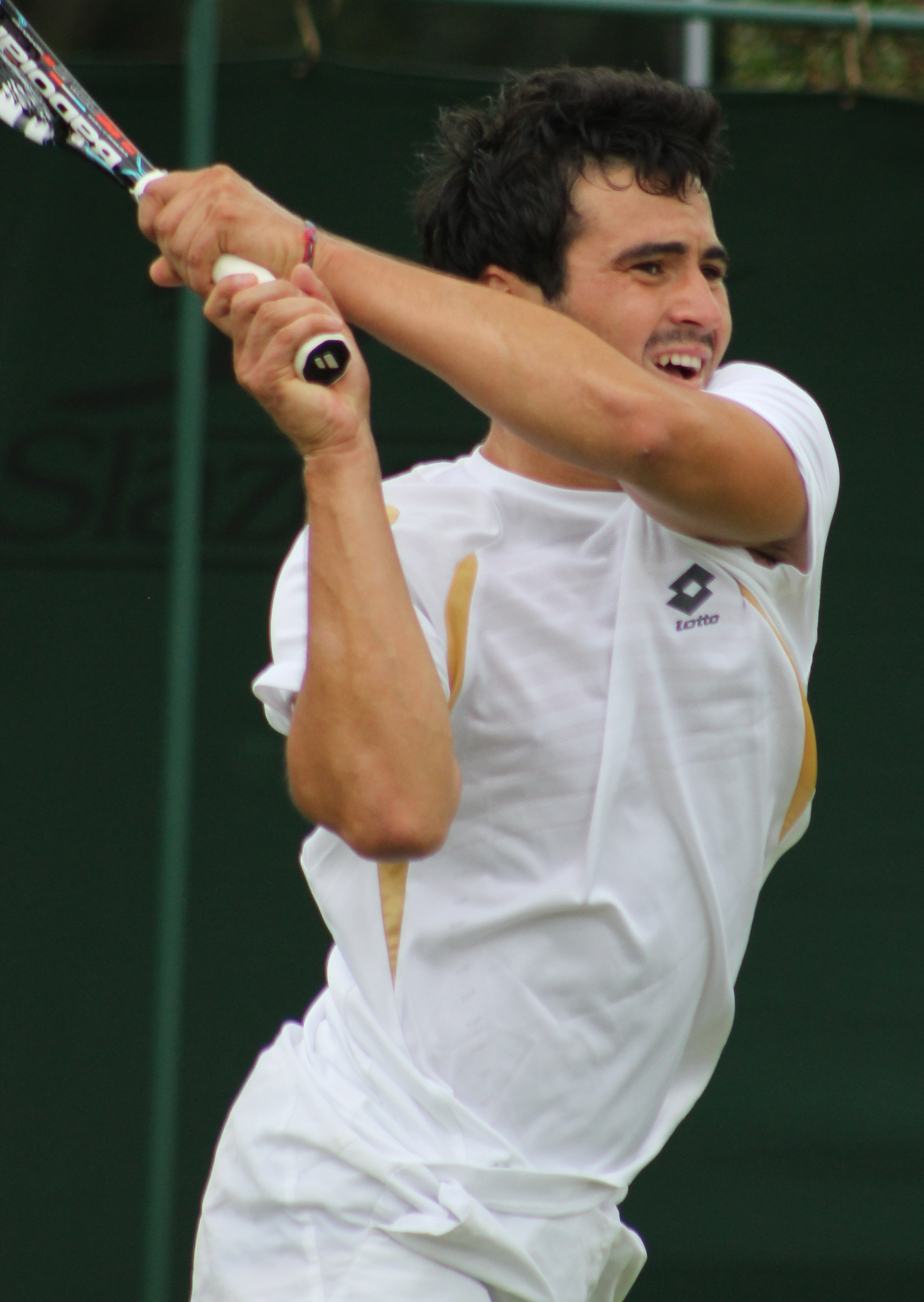
- Country (sports): Croatia
- Residence: Zagreb, Croatia
- Born: 28 December 1991 (age 34) Pula, Croatia
- Height: 1.77 m (5 ft 9 1/2 in)
- Turned pro: 2010
- Plays: Right-handed (double-handed backhand)
- Prize money: $150,212

Singles
- Career record: 0–2 (ATP Tour level, Grand Slam level, and Davis Cup)
- Career titles: 0
- Highest ranking: No. 219 (25 August 2014)

Grand Slam singles results
- Australian Open: Q2 (2014)
- French Open: Q1 (2014)
- Wimbledon: Q2 (2014)
- US Open: Q2 (2014)

Doubles
- Career record: 1-5 (ATP Tour level, Grand Slam level, and Davis Cup)
- Career titles: 0
- Highest ranking: No. 193 (6 October 2014)
- Last updated on: February 2017.

Toni Androić (Croatian pronunciation: [tôni ǎndroitɕ, tôː-]; born 28 December 1991 in Pula) is a tennis player from Croatia.

He was in the main draw of the 2011 Croatia Open with his partner Borut Puc. He is working with Goran Prpić. In 2012, he was part of the HTK Zagreb team that won the national tennis championship.

== Career statistics ==
=== Singles titles (2) ===
Legend
Challengers (0)
Futures (2–6)

Outcome	No.	Date	Tournament	Surface	Opponent	Score
Winner	1.	3 May 2011	Doboj, Bosnia and Herzegovina	Clay	(Czech Republic) Jiří Školoudík	6–4, 6–2
Runner-up	2.	4 July 2011	Yerevan, Armenia	Clay	(Croatia) Dino Marcan	6–4, 2–6, 3–6
Winner	3.	11 May 2011	Yerevan, Armenia	Clay	(Russia) Ervand Gasparyan	6–3, 6–4
Winner	4.	16 August 2011	Čakovec, Croatia	Clay	(Croatia) Dino Marcan	6–4, 6–1
Runner-up	5.	18 January 2012	Antalya, Turkey	Clay	(Bosnia and Herzegovina) Aldin Šetkić	2–6, 2–6
Runner-up	6.	20 February 2012	Zagreb, Croatia	Hard	(United Kingdom) Richard Bloomfield	4–6, 2–6
Runner-up	7.	15 May 2012	Brčko, Bosnia and Herzegovina	Clay	(Bosnia and Herzegovina) Damir Džumhur	6–7, 2–6
Runner-up	8.	21 August 2012	Vinkovci, Croatia	Clay	(Slovenia) Blaž Rola	2–6, 2–6
Runner-up	9.	10 September 2012	Tbilisi, Georgia	Clay	(Georgia (country)) Nikoloz Basilashvili	3–6, 6–4, 6–7
Runner-up	10.	22 January 2013	Antalya, Turkey	Hard	(Spain) Pablo Carreño	3–6, 2–6
Runner-up	11.	2 March 2014	OPT Circuit Kish Island, Iran	Clay	(Spain) Pablo Carreño	7–6^{(8–6)}, 7–6^{(7–5)}
