= Victor Crivoi =

Romanian tennis player

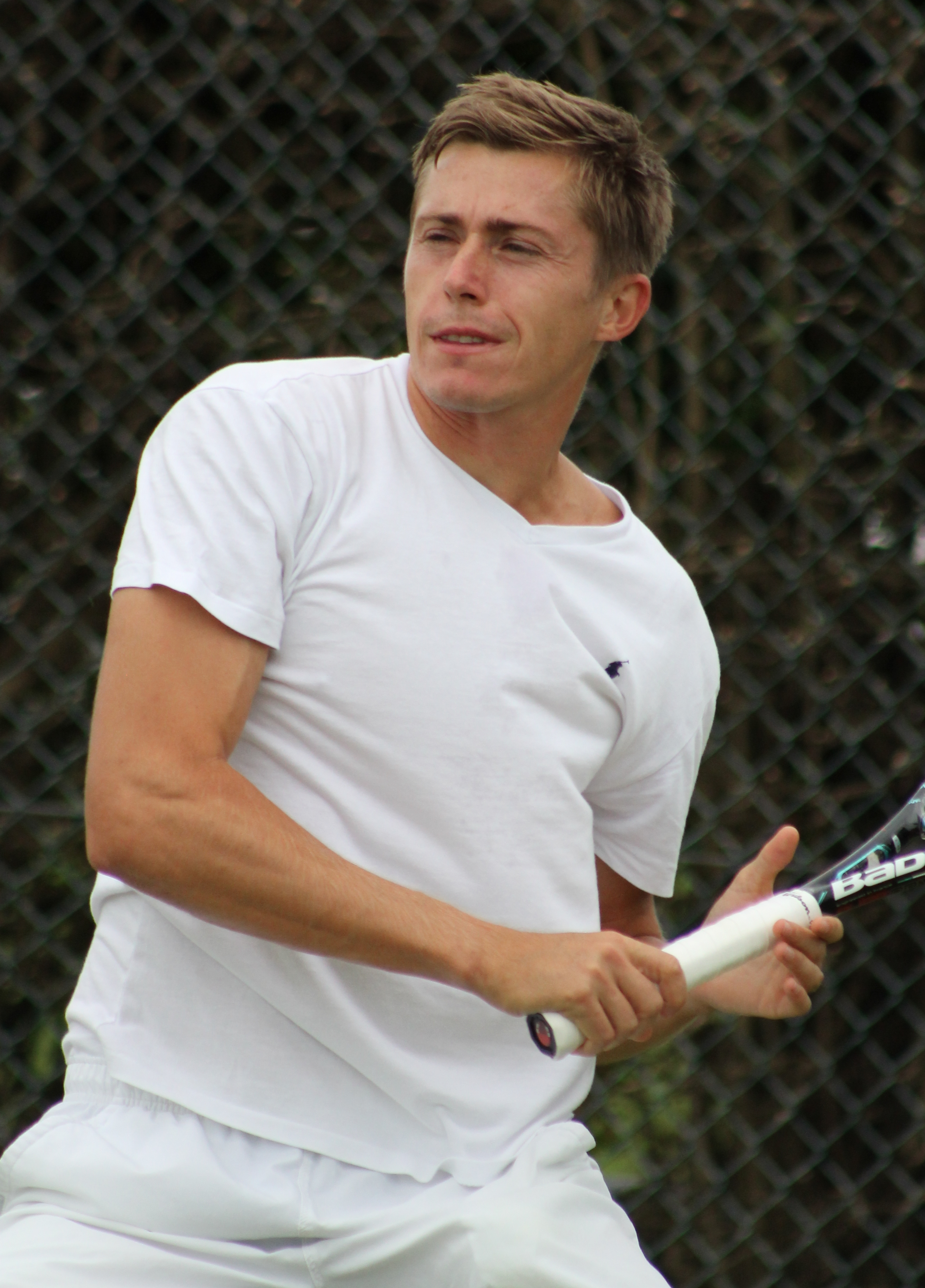
- Country (sports): Romania
- Residence: Bucharest, Romania
- Born: 25 May 1982 (age 44) Bucharest, Romania
- Height: 1.85 m (6 ft 1 in)
- Turned pro: 2003
- Retired: 2020
- Plays: Right-handed (two-handed backhand)
- Prize money: US$ 626,504

Singles
- Career record: 16–37
- Career titles: 0
- Highest ranking: No. 75 (17 August 2009)

Grand Slam singles results
- French Open: 2R (2009)
- Wimbledon: 2R (2009)
- US Open: 1R (2009)

Doubles
- Career record: 0–4
- Career titles: 0
- Highest ranking: No. 300 (30 April 2007)
- Last updated on: 7 November 2016.

Victor-Valentin Crivoi (born 25 May 1982) is a Romanian former professional tennis player and tennis coach. He reached a career-high singles ranking of world No. 75 on 17 August 2009 and played his last professional matches in 2020. A clay-court specialist who spent most of his career on the ATP Challenger Tour and the ITF Circuit, he has since worked as a coach, most prominently with Irina Begu.

== Playing career ==
Crivoi turned professional in 2003. In 2005 he won seven titles on the International Tennis Federation's Professional Circuit and was named the ITF's "Player Of The Year" for that season; he finished the year ranked No. 275 by the ATP, up from No. 480 at the year's start.

His most productive season came in 2009. At the 2009 Internazionali BNL d'Italia in Rome — his only appearance in the main draw of an ATP Masters 1000 event — he came through qualifying and beat 14th seed James Blake 7–5, 6–3 in the first round before losing to Robin Söderling. He also qualified for the 2009 French Open, where he reached the second round before losing to Gaël Monfils, and matched that result at Wimbledon; those, together with the 2008 French Open and the 2009 US Open, were his four Grand Slam main draws.

Crivoi won one Challenger title, at Manerbio in 2008, and 25 titles at ITF Futures level. He represented Romania in six Davis Cup ties between 2006 and 2012, going 4–8 in singles rubbers.

== Coaching career ==
Crivoi was part of the team around Horia Tecău: recalling the preparation for the 2016 Olympic doubles tournament, at which he won a silver medal with Florin Mergea, Tecău named Crivoi alongside Andrei Pavel and Gabriel Trifu among those who supported him throughout the campaign. He has since coached Irina Begu for several years, and was credited with guiding her return to competition in 2026 after an absence of almost ten months.

== Personal life ==
On 8 August 2026, Crivoi married Begu in a civil ceremony attended by close family and friends.

== Career Timelines ==
=== Singles ===
Key
W	F	SF	QF	#R	RR	Q#	P#	DNQ	A	Z#	PO	G	S	B	NMS	NTI	P	NH

(W) winner; (F) finalist; (SF) semifinalist; (QF) quarterfinalist; (#R) rounds 4, 3, 2, 1; (RR) round-robin stage; (Q#) qualification round; (P#) preliminary round; (DNQ) did not qualify; (A) absent; (Z#) Davis/Fed Cup Zonal Group (with number indication) or (PO) play-off; (G) gold, (S) silver or (B) bronze Olympic/Paralympic medal; (NMS) not a Masters tournament; (NTI) not a Tier I tournament; (P) postponed; (NH) not held; (SR) strike rate (events won / competed); (W–L) win–loss record.

Career performance timeline, compiled from ITF/ATP activity records. Current through the 2020 season (final year on tour).

Tournament	2001	2002	2003	2004	2005	2006	2007	2008	2009	2010	2011	2012	2013	2014	2015	2016	2017	2018	2019	2020	SR	W–L	Win %
Grand Slam tournaments
Australian Open	A	A	A	A	A	Q1	Q1	A	Q1	A	Q1	A	A	A	A	A	A	A	A	A	0 / 0	0–0	–
French Open	A	A	A	A	A	Q1	Q1	1R	2R	Q2	Q3	A	Q1	Q1	A	A	A	A	A	A	0 / 2	1–2	33%
Wimbledon	A	A	A	A	A	A	Q1	A	2R	A	Q1	Q1	Q1	Q1	A	A	A	A	A	A	0 / 1	1–1	50%
US Open	A	A	A	A	A	A	A	A	1R	A	A	A	A	A	A	A	A	A	A	A	0 / 1	0–1	0%
Win–loss	0–0	0–0	0–0	0–0	0–0	0–0	0–0	0–1	2–3	0–0	0–0	0–0	0–0	0–0	0–0	0–0	0–0	0–0	0–0	0–0	0 / 4	2–4	33%
National representation
Davis Cup	A	A	A	A	A	PO	A	PO	1R	PO	1R	Z1	A	A	A	A	A	A	A	A	6 ties	4–8	33%
ATP Tour Masters 1000
Indian Wells Open	A	A	A	A	A	A	A	A	A	A	A	A	A	A	A	A	A	A	A	A	0 / 0	0–0	–
Miami Open	A	A	A	A	A	A	A	A	A	A	A	A	A	A	A	A	A	A	A	A	0 / 0	0–0	–
Monte-Carlo Masters	A	A	A	A	A	A	A	A	A	A	A	A	A	A	A	A	A	A	A	A	0 / 0	0–0	–
Madrid Open	NH	NH	A	A	A	A	A	A	A	A	A	A	A	A	A	A	A	A	A	A	0 / 0	0–0	–
Italian Open	A	A	A	A	A	A	A	A	2R	A	A	A	A	A	A	A	A	A	A	A	0 / 1	1–1	50%
Hamburg (former Masters)	A	A	A	A	A	A	A	A	NMS	NMS	NMS	NMS	NMS	NMS	NMS	NMS	NMS	NMS	NMS	NMS	0 / 0	0–0	–
Canadian Open	A	A	A	A	A	A	A	A	A	A	A	A	A	A	A	A	A	A	A	A	0 / 0	0–0	–
Cincinnati Open	A	A	A	A	A	A	A	A	A	A	A	A	A	A	A	A	A	A	A	A	0 / 0	0–0	–
Shanghai Masters	NH	NH	NH	NH	NH	NH	NH	NH	A	A	A	A	A	A	A	A	A	A	A	A	0 / 0	0–0	–
Paris Masters	A	A	A	A	A	A	A	A	A	A	A	A	A	A	A	A	A	A	A	A	0 / 0	0–0	–
Win–loss	0–0	0–0	0–0	0–0	0–0	0–0	0–0	0–0	1–1	0–0	0–0	0–0	0–0	0–0	0–0	0–0	0–0	0–0	0–0	0–0	0 / 1	1–1	50%
Career statistics
	2001	2002	2003	2004	2005	2006	2007	2008	2009	2010	2011	2012	2013	2014	2015	2016	2017	2018	2019	2020	SR	W–L	Win %
Tournaments	0	0	0	0	1	1	0	3	14	5	3	1	1	0	0	0	0	0	0	0	Career total: 29		
Titles	0	0	0	0	0	0	0	0	0	0	0	0	0	0	0	0	0	0	0	0	Career total: 0		
Finals	0	0	0	0	0	0	0	0	0	0	0	0	0	0	0	0	0	0	0	0	Career total: 0		
Hard win–loss	0–0	0–0	0–0	0–0	0–0	0–0	0–0	0–1	1–5	1–1	0–0	0–0	0–0	0–0	0–0	0–0	0–0	0–0	0–0	0–0	0 / 7	2–7	22%
Clay win–loss	0–0	0–0	0–0	0–0	0–1	1–1	0–0	1–2	5–7	1–4	1–3	0–1	0–1	0–0	0–0	0–0	0–0	0–0	0–0	0–0	0 / 20	9–20	31%
Grass win–loss	0–0	0–0	0–0	0–0	0–0	0–0	0–0	0–0	1–2	0–0	0–0	0–0	0–0	0–0	0–0	0–0	0–0	0–0	0–0	0–0	0 / 2	1–2	33%
Other win–loss	0–0	0–0	0–0	0–0	0–0	0–1	0–0	2–0	0–3	1–0	0–3	1–1	0–0	0–0	0–0	0–0	0–0	0–0	0–0	0–0	0 / 0	4–8	33%
Overall win–loss	0–0	0–0	0–0	0–0	0–1	1–2	0–0	3–3	7–17	3–5	1–6	1–2	0–1	0–0	0–0	0–0	0–0	0–0	0–0	0–0	0 / 29	16–37	30%
Win %	–	–	–	–	0%	33%	–	50%	29%	38%	14%	33%	0%	–	–	–	–	–	–	–	Career total: 30%		
Year-end ranking		1066	698	480	275	194	279	135	123	176	240	272	231	316	574	1104			1680	1797	Career high: No. 75 (17 August 2009)		

Note: career-statistics rows count ATP Tour–level main-draw matches plus Davis Cup only (16–37). Outside the tour, Crivoi went 384–211 in ATP Challenger and ITF main draws, winning 1 Challenger title (Manerbio 2008) from 9 finals and 25 ITF Futures titles from 36 finals.

== ATP Challenger and ITF Futures finals ==
=== Singles: 45 (26–19) ===
Legend ATP Challenger (1–8) ITF Futures (25–11)	Finals by surface Hard (0–1) Clay (26–18) Grass (0–0) Carpet (0–0)

Result	W–L	Date	Tournament	Tier	Surface	Opponent	Score
Loss	0–1	May 2004	Romania F2, Bacău	Futures	Clay	(Austria) Rainer Eitzinger	6–2, 4–6, 6–7^{(1–7)}
Loss	0–2	Jul 2004	Romania F12, Brașov	Futures	Clay	(Romania) Artemon Apostu-Efremov	4–6, 6–7^{(3–7)}
Win	1–2	May 2005	Romania F3, Bacău	Futures	Clay	(Romania) Adrian Cruciat	7–6^{(7–2)}, 6–7^{(3–7)}, 6–3
Win	2–2	May 2005	Romania F1, Bucharest	Futures	Clay	(Romania) Gabriel Moraru	6–2, 6–4
Win	3–2	Jun 2005	Romania F8, Bucharest	Futures	Clay	(Chile) Jorge Aguilar	6–1, 6–2
Loss	3–3	Jun 2005	Romania F7, Bucharest	Futures	Clay	(Romania) Adrian Ungur	3–6, 5–7
Win	4–3	Jun 2005	Turkey F1, Ankara	Futures	Clay	(France) Charly Villeneuve	6–0, 4–6, 6–2
Win	5–3	Jul 2005	Romania F10, Focșani	Futures	Clay	(Romania) Adrian Cruciat	7–6^{(9–7)}, 1–6, 6–3
Win	6–3	Aug 2005	Romania F17, Bucharest	Futures	Clay	(Romania) Artemon Apostu-Efremov	4–6, 6–2, 6–4
Win	7–3	Aug 2005	Romania F16, Arad	Futures	Clay	(United States) Angelo Niculescu	6–2, 6–0
Loss	7–4	Oct 2005	Czech Rep. F5, Opava	Futures	Hard	(Czech Republic) Jan Vacek	3–6, 3–6
Win	8–4	Feb 2006	Spain F6, Murcia	Futures	Clay	(Spain) José Antonio Sánchez de Luna	6–2, 6–4
Loss	8–5	Mar 2006	Italy F5, Caltanissetta	Futures	Clay	(Austria) Werner Eschauer	3–6, 6–2, 2–6
Loss	8–6	May 2006	Zagreb, Croatia	Challenger	Clay	(Germany) Daniel Elsner	6–4, 1–6, 2–6
Win	9–6	Jul 2006	Romania F11, Târgu Mureș	Futures	Clay	(Argentina) Martín Alund	6–4, 6–4
Loss	9–7	Sep 2006	Brașov, Romania	Challenger	Clay	(Spain) Marc López	6–4, 3–6, 6–7^{(8–10)}
Loss	9–8	Mar 2007	Morocco F1, Oujda	Futures	Clay	(Morocco) Younes El Aynaoui	0–6, 3–6
Loss	9–9	May 2007	Rome, Italy	Challenger	Clay	(France) Thierry Ascione	3–6, 3–6
Loss	9–10	Jul 2007	Constanța, Romania	Challenger	Clay	(Argentina) Sebastián Decoud	3–6, 3–6
Win	10–10	Mar 2008	Egypt F2, Giza	Futures	Clay	(Egypt) Karim Maamoun	6–3, 6–4
Win	11–10	Mar 2008	Egypt F1, Cairo	Futures	Clay	(Slovakia) Marek Semjan	6–3, 6–2
Win	12–10	Aug 2008	Manerbio, Italy	Challenger	Clay	(Belgium) Christophe Rochus	7–6^{(12–10)}, 6–2
Loss	12–11	Sep 2008	Bucharest, Romania	Challenger	Clay	(Spain) Santiago Ventura	7–5, 4–6, 2–6
Loss	12–12	Apr 2009	Naples, Italy	Challenger	Clay	(Uruguay) Pablo Cuevas	1–6, 3–6
Loss	12–13	Aug 2010	Kitzbühel, Austria	Challenger	Clay	(Italy) Andreas Seppi	2–6, 1–6
Loss	12–14	Jun 2011	Košice, Slovakia	Challenger	Clay	(Germany) Simon Greul	2–6, 1–6
Loss	12–15	Aug 2012	Romania F7, Iași	Futures	Clay	(Serbia) Boris Pašanski	7–6^{(8–6)}, 3–6, 5–7
Win	13–15	Sep 2012	Romania F9, Brașov	Futures	Clay	(Chile) Cristóbal Saavedra Corvalán	6–4, 6–3
Win	14–15	Oct 2012	Morocco F7, Casablanca	Futures	Clay	(Spain) Lamine Ouahab	6–0, 6–3
Win	15–15	Oct 2012	Morocco F6, Casablanca	Futures	Clay	(Spain) Lamine Ouahab	6–3, 1–6, 6–4
Win	16–15	Jan 2013	USA F1, Plantation, Florida	Futures	Clay	(Portugal) Pedro Sousa	6–2, 6–4
Win	17–15	Mar 2013	India F2, Madurai	Futures	Clay	(India) N Vijay Sundar Prashanth	6–1, 6–1
Win	18–15	Mar 2013	India F1, Chennai	Futures	Clay	(India) Jeevan Nedunchezhiyan	7–6^{(7–3)}, 7–5
Win	19–15	Jun 2013	Romania F5, Sibiu	Futures	Clay	(Greece) Theodoros Angelinos	6–2, 6–3
Loss	19–16	Aug 2013	Romania F8, Iași	Futures	Clay	(Croatia) Kristijan Mesaroš	2–6, 6–4, 3–6
Win	20–16	Sep 2013	Romania F10, Brașov	Futures	Clay	(Italy) Filippo Leonardi	6–4, 6–2
Loss	20–17	Oct 2013	Croatia F12, Dubrovnik	Futures	Clay	(Bosnia and Herzegovina) Damir Džumhur	2–6, 6–4, 4–6
Win	21–17	Jan 2014	USA F3, Weston, Florida	Futures	Clay	(United Kingdom) Kyle Edmund	6–7^{(2–7)}, 7–5, 6–0
Win	22–17	Mar 2014	Iran F3, Kish	Futures	Clay	(Croatia) Toni Androić	6–4, 6–4
Loss	22–18	Mar 2014	Iran F2, Kish	Futures	Clay	(Serbia) Peđa Krstin	4–6, 1–6
Win	23–18	Mar 2014	Iran F1, Kish	Futures	Clay	(Croatia) Toni Androić	7–6^{(8–6)}, 7–6^{(7–5)}
Win	24–18	Jun 2014	Romania F5, Sibiu	Futures	Clay	(Romania) Vasile Antonescu	6–4, 1–6, 6–4
Win	25–18	Aug 2014	Romania F10, Cluj-Napoca	Futures	Clay	(Germany) Peter Torebko	6–7^{(5–7)}, 6–3, 6–4
Loss	25–19	May 2015	Romania F3, Bucharest	Futures	Clay	(Kazakhstan) Dmitry Popko	4–6, 6–7^{(1–7)}
Win	26–19	Sep 2015	Romania F15, Brașov	Futures	Clay	(Romania) Teodor-Dacian Crăciun	7–5, 6–1

=== Doubles: 13 (6–7) ===
Legend ATP Challenger (3–2) ITF Futures (3–5)	Finals by surface Hard (0–0) Clay (6–7) Grass (0–0) Carpet (0–0)

Result	W–L	Date	Tournament	Tier	Surface	Partner	Opponents	Score
Loss	0–1	May 2004	Romania F2, Bacău	Futures	Clay	(Romania) Andrei Mlendea	(Romania) Adrian Barbu (Romania) Victor Ioniță	6–7^{(4–7)}, 1–6
Win	1–1	Aug 2006	Timișoara, Romania	Challenger	Clay	(Romania) Victor Ioniță	(Sweden) Ervin Eleskovic (Sweden) Michael Ryderstedt	6–3, 6–4
Loss	1–2	Sep 2006	Como, Italy	Challenger	Clay	(Romania) Gabriel Moraru	(United Kingdom) Jamie Delgado (United Kingdom) Jamie Murray	2–6, 6–4, [7–10]
Loss	1–3	Apr 2007	Chiasso, Switzerland	Challenger	Clay	(Romania) Teodor-Dacian Crăciun	(Netherlands) Bart Beks (Netherlands) Matwé Middelkoop	6–7^{(2–7)}, 5–7
Loss	1–4	May 2012	Romania F2, Bucharest	Futures	Clay	(Romania) Marius Copil	(Romania) Andrei Dăescu (Romania) Florin Mergea	6–7^{(4–7)}, 2–6
Win	2–4	Jun 2012	Romania F3, Bacău	Futures	Clay	(Romania) Marius Copil	(Finland) Harri Heliövaara (Finland) Timo Nieminen	6–3, 6–4
Win	3–4	Sep 2012	Brașov, Romania	Challenger	Clay	(Romania) Marius Copil	(Moldova) Andrei Ciumac (Kazakhstan) Aleksandr Nedovyesov	6–7^{(8–10)}, 6–4, [14–12]
Win	4–4	Oct 2012	Morocco F6, Casablanca	Futures	Clay	(Spain) Lamine Ouahab	(Germany) Steven Moneke (Germany) Marc Sieber	6–1, 3–6, [10–6]
Loss	4–5	Mar 2013	India F2, Madurai	Futures	Clay	(Romania) Patrick Ciorcilă	(Brazil) Caio Silva (India) Ranjeet Virali-Murugesan	4–6, 6–2, [9–11]
Loss	4–6	Jun 2013	Romania F5, Sibiu	Futures	Clay	(Romania) Patrick Ciorcilă	(Romania) Victor Vlad Cornea (Romania) Tudor Cristian Sulea	6–7^{(4–7)}, 6–1, [8–10]
Win	5–6	Sep 2015	Sibiu, Romania	Challenger	Clay	(Romania) Petru-Alexandru Luncanu	(Serbia) Ilija Bozoljac (Serbia) Dušan Lajović	6–4, 6–3
Win	6–6	May 2016	Romania F3, Bucharest	Futures	Clay	(Romania) Petru-Alexandru Luncanu	(Romania) Victor-Mugurel Anagnastopol (Romania) Victor Vlad Cornea	6–4, 2–6, [10–6]
Loss	6–7	May 2018	Romania F1, Bucharest	Futures	Clay	(Romania) Victor Vlad Cornea	(Romania) Vasile Antonescu (Romania) Patrick Grigoriu	1–6, 4–6
