= Tsvetana Pironkova career statistics =

Career finals
Discipline	Type	Won	Lost	Total	WR
Singles	Grand Slam	–	–	–	–
Singles	Summer Olympics	–	–	–	–
Singles	WTA Finals	–	–	–	–
Singles	WTA 1000	–	–	–	–
Singles	WTA Tour	1	0	1	1.00
Singles	Total	1	0	1	1.00
Doubles	Grand Slam	–	–	–	–
Doubles	Summer Olympics	–	–	–	–
Doubles	WTA Finals	–	–	–	–
Doubles	WTA 1000	–	–	–	–
Doubles	WTA Tour	–	–	–	–
Doubles	Total	–	–	–	–
Total		1	0	1	1.00

This is a list of the main career statistics of professional Bulgarian tennis player Tsvetana Pironkova. She won one WTA Tour singles title, at the Premier-level Sydney International in 2014, while at the ITF Women's Circuit, she won six singles titles. During the years, she progressed more in singles and made more significant results, reaching semifinal of the 2010 Wimbledon and quarterfinals of the 2011 Wimbledon Championships, 2016 French Open and 2020 US Open. On the WTA rankings, she has place of 31 as her career-high singles ranking, achieved in September 2010, while in doubles she has place of 141, reached in March 2009. As of March 2021, she earned more than $5m prize money.

== Career achievements ==
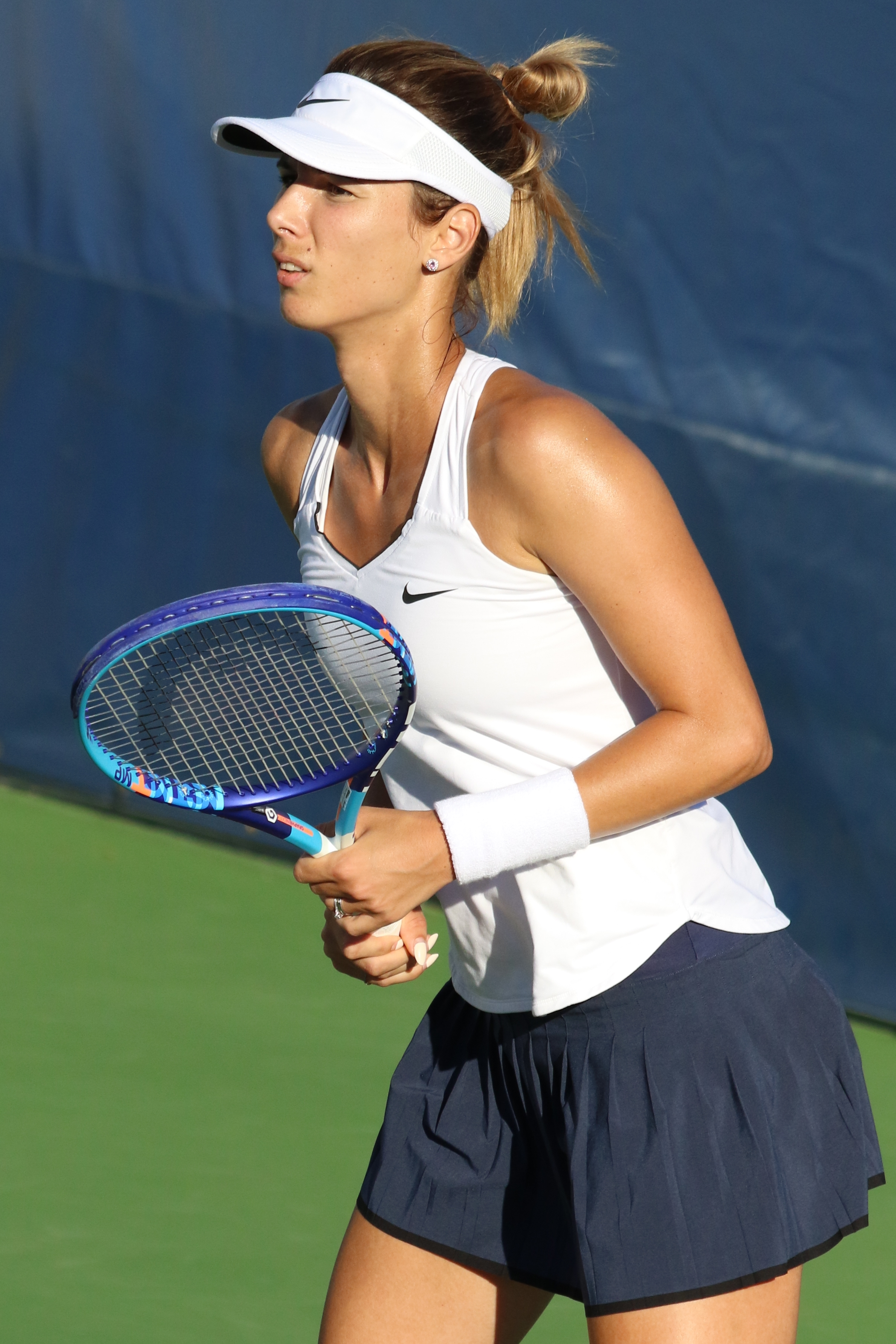
Pironkova at the 2016 US Open

Pironkova made her WTA Tour debut in 2005, but got first recognized at the 2006 Australian Open, when she made her first top-ten win, defeating Venus Williams in the first round. Then, at the 2008 Italian Open, she reached her first significant quarterfinal, where she also defeated world No. 3, Ana Ivanovic, in the second round. At the 2010 Wimbledon Championships, she defeated top 10 Venus Williams in order to reach her first Grand Slam semifinal. The following year, she reached quarterfinal of Wimbledon, but also defeated another top-10 player in that moment, Russian player Vera Zvonareva. At the end of season 2012, Pironkova qualified for her first year-end championships, an Elite-level Tournament of Champions (now known as WTA Elite Trophy) and reached semifinal by defeating Zheng Saisai and losing to Nadia Petrova and Maria Kirilenko in the round-robin group. In the semifinal match, she lost to Caroline Wozniacki in straight sets.

She had strong start of the season of 2014, reaching and winning her first tour final at the Premier-level Sydney International. On her way to the trophy, she defeated three top-ten players, Sara Errani and Petra Kvitová and then in the final, Angelique Kerber. At the 2016 French Open, she had another strong Grand Slam performance, reaching her another quarterfinal, after defeating top-ten Agnieszka Radwańska in the previous round. After comeback of three-years absence, Pironkova had strong performance on her comeback tournament, 2020 US Open, where she reached another major quarterfinal. There, in the second round, she defeated former world No. 1, Garbiñe Muguruza, but later she lost to Serena Williams in the quarterfinal match.

== Performance timeline ==
Key
W	F	SF	QF	#R	RR	Q#	P#	DNQ	A	Z#	PO	G	S	B	NMS	NTI	P	NH

(W) winner; (F) finalist; (SF) semifinalist; (QF) quarterfinalist; (#R) rounds 4, 3, 2, 1; (RR) round-robin stage; (Q#) qualification round; (P#) preliminary round; (DNQ) did not qualify; (A) absent; (Z#) Davis/Fed Cup Zonal Group (with number indication) or (PO) play-off; (G) gold, (S) silver or (B) bronze Olympic/Paralympic medal; (NMS) not a Masters tournament; (NTI) not a Tier I tournament; (P) postponed; (NH) not held; (SR) strike rate (events won / competed); (W–L) win–loss record.
To avoid confusion and double counting, these charts are updated at the conclusion of a tournament or when the player's participation has ended.

Only main-draw results in WTA Tour, Grand Slam tournaments, Fed Cup/Billie Jean King Cup and Olympic Games are included in win–loss records.

=== Singles ===
Tournament	2005	2006	2007	2008	2009	2010	2011	2012	2013	2014	2015	2016	2017	...	2020	2021	SR	W–L	Win%
Grand Slam tournaments
Australian Open	A	2R	1R	2R	2R	2R	2R	2R	1R	2R	2R	1R	1R		A	1R	0 / 13	8–13	38%
French Open	A	2R	1R	2R	1R	1R	2R	2R	1R	2R	3R	QF	2R		3R	Q2	0 / 13	13–13	50%
Wimbledon	Q3	2R	1R	1R	1R	SF	QF	2R	4R	1R	1R	1R	2R		NH	1R	0 / 13	15–13	54%
US Open	Q2	1R	2R	1R	1R	2R	2R	4R	1R	2R	1R	2R	A		QF	1R	0 / 13	12–13	48%
Win–loss	0–0	3–4	1–4	2–4	1–4	7–4	7–4	6–4	3–4	3–4	3–4	5–4	2–3		5–2	0–3	0 / 52	48–52	48%
National representation
Summer Olympics	NH			2R	NH			2R	NH			1R	NH			A	0 / 3	2–3	40%
Year–end championships
WTA Elite Trophy (Note: WTA Tournament of Champions was held from 2009 to 2014, when WTA Elite Trophy replaced it.)	NH				DNQ			SF	RR	RR	DNQ				NH		0 / 3	1–9	10%
WTA 1000
Dubai / Qatar Open (Note: The first Premier 5 event of the year has switched back and forth between the Dubai Tennis Championships and the Qatar Total Open since 2009. Dubai was classified as a Premier 5 event from 2009 to 2011 before being succeeded by Doha for the 2012–2014 period. In 2015, Dubai regained its Premier 5 status while Doha was demoted to Premier status. The Premier 5 tournaments were reclassified as WTA 1000 tournaments in 2021.)	NT1			A	2R	Q1	2R	3R	1R	2R	A	1R	Q3		A	A	0 / 6	5–6	45%
Indian Wells Open	A	2R	2R	2R	2R	2R	2R	1R	1R	1R	1R	2R	1R		NH	A	0 / 12	6–12	33%
Miami Open	A	1R	1R	1R	1R	2R	2R	2R	1R	3R	2R	Q2	1R		NH	2R	0 / 12	6–12	33%
Madrid Open	NH				1R	Q1	1R	1R	1R	1R	2R	Q1	Q1		NH	Q1	0 / 6	1–6	14%
Italian Open	A	A	A	QF	1R	Q1	1R	1R	1R	1R	1R	Q1	Q1		A	A	0 / 7	3–7	30%
Cincinnati Open	NT1				A	A	1R	1R	Q1	1R	2R	2R	A		A	A	0 / 5	2–5	29%
Pan Pacific / Wuhan Open (Note: In 2014, the Pan Pacific Open was downgraded to a Premier event and replaced by the Wuhan Open. The Premier 5 tournaments were reclassified as WTA 1000 tournaments in 2021.)	A	A	A	A	A	A	2R	2R	1R	Q2	A	A	A		NH		0 / 3	2–3	40%
China Open	NT1				A	1R	1R	1R	Q1	2R	1R	A	A		NH		0 / 5	1–5	17%
Career statistics
Tournaments	3	16	15	18	20	15	22	22	19	18	21	14	10		2	6	Career total: 221		
Titles	0	0	0	0	0	0	0	0	0	1	0	0	0		0	0	Career total: 1		
Finals	0	0	0	0	0	0	0	0	0	1	0	0	0		0	0	Career total: 1		
Overall win–loss	6–3	15–16	7–15	16–18	9–20	16–15	13–22	20–24	9–21	16–19	18–21	11–14	6–10		5–2	3–6	1 / 221	170–226	43%
Year-end ranking	88	62	98	46	99	35	46	42	108	39	59	64	162		135	245	$5,321,439		

=== Doubles ===
Tournament	2006	2007	2008	2009	2010	2011	2012	2013	2014	2015	...	W–L	Win%
Australian Open	A	2R	A	2R	A	1R	A	A	A	A		2–3	40%
French Open	2R	A	2R	1R	A	1R	1R	A	A	1R		2–6	25%
Wimbledon	A	A	1R	A	A	2R	A	2R	2R	1R		3–5	38%
US Open	1R	A	2R	A	1R	1R	1R	A	A	A		1–5	17%
Win–loss	1–2	1–1	2–3	1–2	0–1	1–4	0–2	1–1	1–1	0–2		8–19	30%

== WTA Tour finals ==
=== Singles: 1 (title) ===
Legend
Premier / WTA 500 (1–0)
International / WTA 250 (0–0)

Result	W–L	Date	Tournament	Tier	Surface	Opponent	Score
Win	1–0	Jan 2014	Sydney International, Australia	Premier	Hard	(Germany) Angelique Kerber	6–4, 6–4

== ITF Circuit finals ==
=== Singles: 13 (6 titles, 7 runner-ups) ===
Legend $100,000 tournaments $75,000 tournaments $50,000 tournaments $25,000 tournaments $10,000 tournaments	Finals by surface Hard (3–1) Clay (2–5) Carpet (1–1)

Result	W–L	Date	Tournament	Tier	Surface	Opponent	Score
Loss	0–1	Aug 2002	ITF Bucharest, Romania	10,000	Clay	(Romania) Monica Niculescu	1–6, 6–7^{(4–7)}
Win	1–1	Sep 2002	ITF Volos, Greece	10,000	Carpet	(Switzerland) Tina Schmassmann	7–6^{(7–3)}, 7–5
Win	2–1	Jun 2003	ITF Orestiada, Greece	10,000	Hard	(Romania) Simona Matei	6–1, 6–4
Win	3–1	Aug 2003	ITF Istanbul, Turkey	10,000	Hard	(Turkey) İpek Şenoğlu	7–6^{(7–2)}, 6–0
Loss	3–2	Sep 2003	ITF Volos, Greece	10,000	Carpet	(Bulgaria) Sesil Karatantcheva	4–6, 6–2, 2–6
Win	4–2	Nov 2003	ITF Istanbul, Turkey	10,000	Hard	(Israel) Shahar Pe'er	6–3, 6–2
Loss	4–3	Nov 2004	ITF Barcelona, Spain	25,000	Clay	(Spain) Laura Pous Tió	6–4, 5–7, 2–6
Loss	4–4	Jan 2005	ITF Belfort, France	25,000	Hard (i)	(Czech Republic) Sandra Kleinová	4–6, 3–6
Win	5–4	Apr 2005	ITF Rome, Italy	25,000	Clay	(Romania) Magda Mihalache	7–5, 7–5
Loss	5–5	Jun 2005	Zagreb Ladies Open, Croatia	75,000	Clay	(Czech Republic) Zuzana Ondrášková	6–4, 4–6, 3–6
Loss	5–6	Nov 2005	ITF Deauville, France	50,000	Clay (i)	(Ukraine) Viktoriya Kutuzova	4–6, 6–7^{(2–7)}
Win	6–6	Sep 2007	ITF Bordeaux, France	100,000	Clay	(France) Alizé Cornet	6–2, 6–3
Loss	6–7	Sep 2008	ITF Sofia, Bulgaria	100,000	Clay	(Spain) Nuria Llagostera Vives	2–6, 3–6

== WTA Tour career earnings ==
Correct as of 15 November 2021

Year	Grand Slam singles titles	WTA singles titles	Total singles titles	Earnings ($)	Money list rank
2006	0	0	0	154,767	95
2007	0	0	0	N/A	N/A
2008	0	0	0	212,463	86
2009	0	0	0	212,039	85
2010	0	0	0	584,860	35
2011	0	0	0	467,210	47
2012	0	0	0	449,457	46
2013	0	0	0	381,626	69
2014	0	1	1	514,802	54
2015	0	0	0	469,107	61
2016	0	0	0	579,912	58
2017	0	0	0	253,512	129
2018–19	absent				
2020	0	0	0	564,267	33
2021	0	0	0	260,077	147
Career	0	1	1	5,321,439	112

== Career Grand Slam statistics ==
=== Best results details ===
Grand Slam winners are in boldface, and runner–ups are in italics.

**Australian Open**
**2006 Australian Open (not seeded)**
Round	Opponent	Rank	Score
1R	(United States) Venus Williams (10)	10	2–6, 6–0, 9–7
2R	(United States) Laura Granville	57	5–7, 2–6
**... 2008, 2009, 2010, 2011, 2012, 2014 (Note: Pironkova has second round as her highest result at the Australian Open, first achieved in 2006 and then repreated it from 2008 to 2012 and then again in 2014 and 2015.)**
**2015 Australian Open (not seeded)**
Round	Opponent	Rank	Score
1R	(United Kingdom) Heather Watson	38	6–4, 6–0
2R	(Slovakia) Dominika Cibulková (11)	10	2–6, 0–6

**Wimbledon Championships**
**2010 Wimbledon Championships (not seeded)**
Round	Opponent	Rank	Score
1R	(Russia) Anna Lapushchenkova	96	6–0, 7–6^{(9–7)}
2R	(Russia) Vera Dushevina	56	6–3, 6–4
3R	(Russia) Regina Kulikova	69	6–4, 2–0 ret.
4R	(France) Marion Bartoli (11)	13	6–4, 6–4
QF	(United States) Venus Williams (2)	2	6–2, 6–3
SF	(Russia) Vera Zvonareva (21)	21	6–3, 3–6, 2–6

**French Open**
**2016 French Open (not seeded)**
Round	Opponent	Rank	Score
1R	(Italy) Sara Errani (16)	18	6–3, 6–2
2R	(Sweden) Johanna Larsson	62	7–5, 7–6^{(8–6)}
3R	(United States) Sloane Stephens (19)	22	6–2, 6–1
4R	(Poland) Agnieszka Radwańska (2)	2	2–6, 6–3, 6–3
QF	(Australia) Samantha Stosur (21)	24	4–6, 6–7^{(6–8)}

**US Open**
**2020 US Open (Protected ranking)**
Round	Opponent	Rank	Score
1R	(Russia) Liudmila Samsonova	120	6–2, 6–3
2R	(Spain) Garbiñe Muguruza (10)	16	7–5, 6–3
3R	(Croatia) Donna Vekić (18)	24	6–4, 6–1
4R	(France) Alizé Cornet	56	6–4, 6–7^{(5–7)}, 6–3
QF	(United States) Serena Williams (3)	8	6–4, 3–6, 2–6

== Top-10 wins ==
Season	2006	2007	2008	2009	2010	2011	2012	2013	2014	2015	2016	Total
Wins	1	0	1	1	2	1	2	0	3	0	1	12

#	Player	Rank	Event	Surface	Rd	Score	TPR
2006
1.	(United States) Venus Williams	No. 10	Australian Open	Hard	1R	2–6, 6–0, 9–7	95
2008
2.	(Serbia) Ana Ivanovic	No. 3	Italian Open	Clay	2R	6–4, 5–7, 6–2	64
2009
3.	(Russia) Vera Zvonareva	No. 7	Kremlin Cup, Russia	Hard (i)	2R	6–0, 6–2	126
2010
4.	(Russia) Elena Dementieva	No. 5	Warsaw Open, Poland	Clay	2R	7–5, 4–6, 6–4	100
5.	(United States) Venus Williams	No. 2	Wimbledon, UK	Grass	QF	6–2, 6–3	82
2011
6.	(Russia) Vera Zvonareva	No. 3	Wimbledon, UK	Grass	3R	6–2, 6–3	33
2012
7.	(China) Li Na	No. 9	Open GDF Suez, France	Hard (i)	1R	7–6^{(7–5)}, 3–2 ret.	50
8.	(Poland) Agnieszka Radwańska	No. 3	Eastbourne International, UK	Grass	1R	6–2, 6–4	40
2014
9.	(Italy) Sara Errani	No. 7	Sydney International, Australia	Hard	QF	7–6^{(7–2)}, 6–3	107
10.	(Czech Republic) Petra Kvitová	No. 6	Sydney International, Australia	Hard	SF	6–4, 6–3	107
11.	(Germany) Angelique Kerber	No. 9	Sydney International, Australia	Hard	F	6–4, 6–4	107
2016
12.	(Poland) Agnieszka Radwańska	No. 2	French Open	Clay	4R	2–6, 6–3, 6–3	102
