= 2006 Pacific Life Open – Women's singles =

Women's singles
- 2006 Pacific Life Open

Final
- Champion: (Russia) Maria Sharapova
- Runner-up: (Russia) Elena Dementieva
- Score: 6–1, 6–2

Details
- Draw: 96 (8WC/12Q/1LL)
- Seeds: 32

Events
| Singles | men | women |
| Doubles | men | women |
| ← 2005 · | Indian Wells Masters | · 2007 → |

Maria Sharapova defeated Elena Dementieva in the final, 6–1, 6–2 to win the women's singles tennis title at the 2006 Indian Wells Masters.

Kim Clijsters was the reigning champion, but chose not to participate that year.

== Seeds ==
All seeds received a bye into the second round.

1. (Belgium) Justine Henin-Hardenne (semifinals)
2. (United States) Lindsay Davenport (fourth round)
3. (Russia) Maria Sharapova (champion)
4. (Russia) Elena Dementieva (final)
5. (Russia) Anastasia Myskina (fourth round)
6. (Italy) Flavia Pennetta (third round)
7. (Germany) Anna-Lena Grönefeld (quarterfinals)
8. (Serbia and Montenegro) Ana Ivanovic (quarterfinals)
9. (France) Nathalie Dechy (second round)
10. (Russia) Dinara Safina (quarterfinals)
11. (Russia) Maria Kirilenko (third round)
12. (France) Tatiana Golovin (third round)
13. (Spain) Anabel Medina Garrigues (second round)
14. (Japan) Ai Sugiyama (fourth round)
15. (Serbia and Montenegro) Jelena Janković (second round)
16. (Czech Republic) Klára Koukalová (second round)
17. (Argentina) Gisela Dulko (quarterfinals)
18. (Czech Republic) Lucie Šafářová (third round)
19. (Switzerland) Martina Hingis (semifinals)
20. (France) Marion Bartoli (third round)
21. (Israel) Shahar Pe'er (fourth round)
22. (Russia) Anna Chakvetadze (fourth round)
23. (Colombia) Catalina Castaño (second round)
24. (Czech Republic) Iveta Benešová (second round)
25. (Italy) Mara Santangelo (second round)
26. (Israel) Anna Smashnova (third round)
27. (Poland) Marta Domachowska (third round)
28. (India) Sania Mirza (third round)
29. (United States) Amy Frazier (second round)
30. (France) Émilie Loit (second round)
31. (United States) Laura Granville (third round)
32. (United States) Jill Craybas (second round)

== Draw ==
=== Key ===
- Q = Qualifier
- WC = Wild card
- LL = Lucky loser
- Alt = Alternate
- SE = Special exempt
- PR = Protected ranking
- ITF = ITF entry
- JE = Junior exempt
- w/o = Walkover
- r = Retired
- d = Defaulted
- SR = Special ranking

=== Finals ===
Quarterfinals
1 | (Belgium) Justine Henin-Hardenne | 6 | 6
17 | (Argentina) Gisela Dulko | 3 | 2
4 | (Russia) Elena Dementieva | 2 | 6 | 6
8 | (Serbia and Montenegro) Ana Ivanovic | 6 | 4 | 2
7 | (Germany) Anna-Lena Grönefeld | 1 | 3
3 | (Russia) Maria Sharapova | 6 | 6
10 | (Russia) Dinara Safina | 3 | 4
19 | (Switzerland) Martina Hingis | 6 | 6

Semifinals
1 | (Belgium) Justine Henin-Hardenne | 6 | 5 | 5
4 | (Russia) Elena Dementieva | 2 | 7 | 7
3 | (Russia) Maria Sharapova | 6 | 6
19 | (Switzerland) Martina Hingis | 3 | 3

Final
4 | (Russia) Elena Dementieva | 1 | 2
3 | (Russia) Maria Sharapova | 6 | 6

=== Top half ===
==== Section 1 ====
First round
(Bulgaria) T Pironkova | 6 | 6
(Spain) V Ruano Pascual | 4 | 3
WC | (Netherlands) B Schultz-McCarthy | 4 | 2
(Japan) A Nakamura | 6 | 6
(Germany) S Klösel | 6 | 6^{1} | 6^{3}
Q | (United States) J Kirkland | 4 | 7 | 7
(China) S Peng | 6 | 3 | 3
(France) S Foretz | 3 | 6 | 6

Second round
1 | (Belgium) J Henin-Hardenne | 6 | 6
(Bulgaria) T Pironkova | 2 | 2
(Japan) A Nakamura | 6 | 7
25 | (Italy) M Santangelo | 3 | 5
18 | (Czech Republic) L Šafářová | 6^{6} | 7 | 6
Q | (United States) J Kirkland | 7 | 6^{2} | 1
(France) S Foretz | 5 | 0
14 | (Japan) A Sugiyama | 7 | 6

Third round
1 | (Belgium) J Henin-Hardenne | 6 | 6
(Japan) A Nakamura | 0 | 0
18 | (Czech Republic) L Šafářová | 3 | 5
14 | (Japan) A Sugiyama | 6 | 7

Fourth round
1 | (Belgium) J Henin-Hardenne | 6 | 6
14 | (Japan) A Sugiyama | 2 | 1

==== Section 2 ====
First round
(Venezuela) M Vento-Kabchi | 4 | 6 | 1
(Spain) L Domínguez Lino | 6 | 1 | 6
(France) S Cohen-Aloro | 6 | 6
(Spain) A Parra Santonja | 1 | 2
(Finland) E Laine | 7 | 7
(Czech Republic) H Šromová | 5 | 5
WC | (United States) A Stevenson | 6^{1} | 2
Q | (Croatia) I Lisjak | 7 | 6

Second round
12 | (France) T Golovin | 6 | 6
(Spain) L Domínguez Lino | 2 | 0
(France) S Cohen-Aloro | 6^{3} | 1
17 | (Argentina) G Dulko | 7 | 6
32 | (United States) J Craybas | 5 | 1
(Finland) E Laine | 7 | 6
Q | (Croatia) I Lisjak | 1 | 2
6 | (Italy) F Pennetta | 6 | 6

Third round
12 | (France) T Golovin | 6 | 5 | 6^{6}
17 | (Argentina) G Dulko | 1 | 7 | 7
(Finland) E Laine | 1
6 | (Italy) F Pennetta | 0 | r

Fourth round
17 | (Argentina) G Dulko | 7 | 7
(Finland) E Laine | 5 | 6^{3}

==== Section 3 ====
First round
Q | (Belarus) A Yakimova | 6 | 6
Q | (Belarus) T Poutchek | 0 | 2
Q | (Australia) N Pratt | 7 | 4 | 3
Q | (United States) B Mattek | 6^{6} | 6 | 6
(China) N Li | 6 | 6
Q | (Luxembourg) A Kremer | 1 | 3
Q | (Russia) A Rodionova | 3 | 1
WC | (United States) V King | 6 | 6

Second round
4 | (Russia) E Dementieva | 6 | 3 | 6
Q | (Belarus) A Yakimova | 4 | 6 | 3
Q | (United States) B Mattek | 2 | 6 | 5
28 | (India) S Mirza | 6 | 3 | 7
24 | (Czech Republic) I Benešová | 0 | 1
(China) N Li | 6 | 6
WC | (United States) V King | 6 | 6
16 | (Czech Republic) K Koukalová | 3 | 3

Third round
4 | (Russia) E Dementieva | 5 | 6 | 6
28 | (India) S Mirza | 7 | 4 | 4
(China) N Li | 6 | 6
WC | (United States) V King | 2 | 4

Fourth round
4 | (Russia) E Dementieva | 6 | 6
(China) N Li | 3 | 2

==== Section 4 ====
First round
(Croatia) K Šprem | 4 | 6 | 3
(Japan) S Asagoe | 6 | 4 | 6
(Russia) E Vesnina | 2 | 3
(Ukraine) V Kutuzova | 6 | 6
(Argentina) M Díaz Oliva | 2 | 1
WC | (United States) S Perry | 6 | 6
(France) S Brémond | 6 | 6
(Czech Republic) Z Ondrášková | 2 | 2

Second round
11 | (Russia) M Kirilenko | 6 | 6
(Japan) S Asagoe | 2 | 1
(Ukraine) V Kutuzova | 4 | 5
22 | (Russia) A Chakvetadze | 6 | 7
29 | (United States) A Frazier | 6^{1} | 3
WC | (United States) S Perry | 7 | 6
(France) S Brémond | 3 | 2
8 | (Serbia and Montenegro) A Ivanovic | 6 | 6

Third round
11 | (Russia) M Kirilenko | 2 | 3
22 | (Russia) A Chakvetadze | 6 | 6
WC | (United States) S Perry | 1 | 3
8 | (Serbia and Montenegro) A Ivanovic | 6 | 6

Fourth round
22 | (Russia) A Chakvetadze | 3 | 3
8 | (Serbia and Montenegro) A Ivanovic | 6 | 6

=== Bottom half ===
==== Section 5 ====
First round
(Germany) J Schruff | 6 | 6
(China) T Sun | 4 | 3
WC | (United States) A Glatch | 0 | 1
(Slovakia) M Suchá | 6 | 6
(Russia) E Bychkova | 6 | 6
(Slovakia) H Nagyová | 3 | 0
(Estonia) M Ani | 3 | 6 | 6
(Italy) A Serra Zanetti | 6 | 2 | 0

Second round
7 | (Germany) A-L Grönefeld | 6 | 6
(Germany) J Schruff | 1 | 0
(Slovakia) M Suchá | 2 | 2
26 | (Israel) A Smashnova | 6 | 6
20 | (France) M Bartoli | 6 | 3 | 6
(Russia) E Bychkova | 3 | 6 | 3
(Estonia) M Ani | 2 | 6 | 6
9 | (France) N Dechy | 6 | 2 | 2

Third round
7 | (Germany) A-L Grönefeld | 2 | 6 | 6
26 | (Israel) A Smashnova | 6 | 1 | 2
20 | (France) M Bartoli | 6^{4} | 2
(Estonia) M Ani | 7 | 6

Fourth round
7 | (Germany) A-L Grönefeld | 6 | 6
(Estonia) M Ani | 1 | 4

==== Section 6 ====
First round
LL | (Italy) ME Camerin | 2 | 6 | 3
(Greece) E Daniilidou | 6 | 2 | 6
(Puerto Rico) K Brandi | 4 | 4
(Switzerland) E Gagliardi | 6 | 6
(United States) L Raymond | 2 | 6 | 7
Q | (Czech Republic) K Böhmová | 6 | 4 | 6^{5}
WC | (Georgia (country)) A Tatishvili | 2 | 3
(United States) J Jackson | 6 | 6

Second round
13 | (Spain) A Medina Garrigues | 3 | 4
(Greece) E Daniilidou | 6 | 6
(Switzerland) E Gagliardi | 3 | 7 | 2
21 | (Israel) S Pe'er | 6 | 6^{4} | 6
30 | (France) É Loit | 7 | 4 | 4
(United States) L Raymond | 6^{5} | 6 | 6
(United States) J Jackson | 4 | 3
3 | (Russia) M Sharapova | 6 | 6

Third round
(Greece) E Daniilidou | 6 | 6^{4} | 5
21 | (Israel) S Pe'er | 4 | 7 | 7
(United States) L Raymond | 4 | 0
3 | (Russia) M Sharapova | 6 | 6

Fourth round
21 | (Israel) S Pe'er | 6^{2} | 1
3 | (Russia) M Sharapova | 7 | 6

==== Section 7 ====
First round
(Spain) M Sánchez Lorenzo | 3 | 6 | 3
(United States) M Washington | 6 | 3 | 6
(United States) M Shaughnessy | 7 | 6
(Estonia) K Kanepi | 6^{4} | 1
Q | (China) M Yuan | 6 | 6
(Japan) A Morigami | 4 | 4
(Australia) S Stosur | 3 | 6 | 6
Q | (Ukraine) Y Fedak | 6 | 3 | 0

Second round
5 | (Russia) A Myskina | 6 | 6
(United States) M Washington | 2 | 2
(United States) M Shaughnessy | 4 | 6 | 2
27 | (Poland) M Domachowska | 6 | 3 | 6
23 | (Colombia) C Castaño | 6^{5} | 2
Q | (China) M Yuan | 7 | 6
(Australia) S Stosur | 3 | 2
10 | (Russia) D Safina | 6 | 6

Third round
5 | (Russia) A Myskina | 7 | 6
27 | (Poland) M Domachowska | 5 | 3
Q | (China) M Yuan | 3 | 1
10 | (Russia) D Safina | 6 | 6

Fourth round
5 | (Russia) A Myskina | 1 | 3
10 | (Russia) D Safina | 6 | 6

==== Section 8 ====
First round
(Austria) S Bammer | 6 | 3 | 6
(China) J Zheng | 1 | 6 | 4
(Japan) S Obata | 2 | 2
(France) C Pin | 6 | 6
(Italy) T Garbin | 6 | 7
(Ukraine) A Bondarenko | 3 | 5
WC | (United States) A Harkleroad | 6 | 7
(China) Z Yan | 3 | 5

Second round
15 | (Serbia and Montenegro) J Janković | 5 | 4
(Austria) S Bammer | 7 | 6
(France) C Pin | 1 | 3
19 | (Switzerland) M Hingis | 6 | 6
31 | (United States) L Granville | 6 | 6
(Italy) T Garbin | 1 | 2
WC | (United States) A Harkleroad | 0 | 0
2 | (United States) L Davenport | 6 | 6

Third round
(Austria) S Bammer | 0 | 3
19 | (Switzerland) M Hingis | 6 | 6
31 | (United States) L Granville | 4 | 0
2 | (United States) L Davenport | 6 | 6

Fourth round
19 | (Switzerland) M Hingis | 6 | 1 | 6
2 | (United States) L Davenport | 3 | 6 | 2

== Qualifying ==
=== Seeds ===
1. (Italy) Maria Elena Camerin (qualifying competition, Lucky loser)
2. (Hungary) Melinda Czink (first round)
3. (Germany) Martina Müller (first round)
4. (Belarus) Anastasiya Yakimova (qualifying competition)
5. (Czech Republic) Eva Birnerová (qualifying competition)
6. (China) Yuan Meng (qualified)
7. (Ukraine) Yuliana Fedak (qualified)
8. (Russia) Anastasia Rodionova (qualified)
9. (United States) Bethanie Mattek (qualified)
10. (Argentina) María Emilia Salerni (first round)
11. (Ukraine) Kateryna Bondarenko (first round)
12. (France) Camille Pin (qualified)
13. (Austria) Yvonne Meusburger (first round)
14. (Italy) Nathalie Viérin (qualifying competition)
15. (Japan) Rika Fujiwara (qualifying competition)
16. (Ukraine) Mariya Koryttseva (first round)
17. (Croatia) Ivana Lisjak (qualified)
18. (Czech Republic) Kateřina Böhmová (qualified)
19. (Belarus) Victoria Azarenka (qualifying competition)
20. (Chinese Taipei) Hsieh Su-wei (qualifying competition)
21. (Venezuela) Milagros Sequera (qualified)
22. (Uzbekistan) Varvara Lepchenko (qualifying competition)
23. (United States) Lilia Osterloh (qualifying competition)
24. (Australia) Nicole Pratt (qualified)

=== Qualifiers ===
1. (Czech Republic) Kateřina Böhmová
2. (Luxembourg) Anne Kremer
3. (Croatia) Ivana Lisjak
4. (Belarus) Anastasiya Yakimova
5. (Australia) Nicole Pratt
6. (China) Yuan Meng
7. (Ukraine) Yuliana Fedak
8. (Russia) Anastasia Rodionova
9. (United States) Bethanie Mattek
10. (United States) Jessica Kirkland
11. (Belarus) Tatiana Poutchek
12. (France) Camille Pin

=== Lucky loser ===
1. (Italy) Maria Elena Camerin

=== Qualifying draw ===
==== First qualifier ====
| First round | | | | | Qualifying competition |
| 1 | (Italy) Maria Elena Camerin | 6^{5} | 6 | 6 |
| | (India) Shikha Uberoi | 7^{7} | 4 | 2 | 1 | (Italy) Maria Elena Camerin | 6^{6} | 6 | 2 |
| WC | (United States) Pam Montez | 2 | 1 | | 18 | (Czech Republic) Kateřina Böhmová | 7^{8} | 2 | 6 |
| 18 | (Czech Republic) Kateřina Böhmová | 6 | 6 |

==== Second qualifier ====
| First round | | | | | Qualifying competition |
| 2 | (Hungary) Melinda Czink | 3 | 6 | 2 |
| | (Luxembourg) Anne Kremer | 6 | 3 | 6 | (Luxembourg) Anne Kremer | 6 | 6 |
| | (United States) Meilen Tu | 6 | 6 | | (United States) Meilen Tu | 1 | 0 |
| 16 | (Ukraine) Mariya Koryttseva | 3 | 3 |

==== Third qualifier ====
| First round | | | | Qualifying competition |
| 3 | (Germany) Martina Müller | 3 | 6^{3} |
| | (Czech Republic) Barbora Strýcová | 6 | 7^{7} | | (Czech Republic) Barbora Strýcová | 4 | 4 |
| | (Slovakia) Ľudmila Cervanová | 0 | 0 | 17 | (Croatia) Ivana Lisjak | 6 | 6 |
| 17 | (Croatia) Ivana Lisjak | 6 | 6 |

==== Fourth qualifier ====
| First round | | | | | Qualifying competition |
| 4 | (Belarus) Anastasiya Yakimova | 6 | 6 |
| WC | (United States) Anne Yelsey | 4 | 0 | | 4 | (Belarus) Anastasiya Yakimova | 5 | 0 |
| | (Ukraine) Tatiana Perebiynis | 6 | 3 | 4 | 21 | (Venezuela) Milagros Sequera | 7 | 6 |
| 21 | (Venezuela) Milagros Sequera | 3 | 6 | 6 |

==== Fifth qualifier ====
| First round | | | | Qualifying competition |
| 5 | (Czech Republic) Eva Birnerová | 6 | 6 |
| | (Japan) Ryōko Fuda | 4 | 4 | 5 | (Czech Republic) Eva Birnerová | 6 | 2 | 4 |
| | (Canada) Stéphanie Dubois | 2 | 3 | 24 | (Australia) Nicole Pratt | 1 | 6 | 6 |
| 24 | (Australia) Nicole Pratt | 6 | 6 |

==== Sixth qualifier ====
| First round | | | | Qualifying competition |
| 6 | (China) Yuan Meng | 6 | 6 |
| | (United States) Angela Haynes | 3 | 3 | 6 | (China) Yuan Meng | 4 | 6 | 7 |
| | (Thailand) Tamarine Tanasugarn | 1 | 0 | 22 | (Uzbekistan) Varvara Lepchenko | 6 | 2 | 5 |
| 22 | (Uzbekistan) Varvara Lepchenko | 6 | 6 |

==== Seventh qualifier ====
| First round | | | | Qualifying competition |
| 7 | (Ukraine) Yuliana Fedak | 7^{7} | 6 |
| | (Argentina) Natalia Gussoni | 6^{4} | 2 | 7 | (Ukraine) Yuliana Fedak | 6^{4} | 6 | 6 |
| | (Russia) Tatiana Panova | 0 | 3 | 20 | (Chinese Taipei) Hsieh Su-wei | 7^{7} | 3 | 4 |
| 20 | (Chinese Taipei) Hsieh Su-wei | 6 | 6 |

==== Eighth qualifier ====
| First round | | | | | Qualifying competition |
| 8 | (Russia) Anastasia Rodionova | 1 | 6 | 6 |
| | (Ukraine) Julia Vakulenko | 6 | 4 | 4 | 8 | (Russia) Anastasia Rodionova | 5 | 6 | 6 |
| | (Brazil) Maria Fernanda Alves | 4 | 4 | | 14 | (Italy) Nathalie Viérin | 7 | 4 | 2 |
| 14 | (Italy) Nathalie Viérin | 6 | 6 |

==== Ninth qualifier ====
| First round | | | | | Qualifying competition |
| 9 | (United States) Bethanie Mattek | 6 | 2 | 4 |
| | (Romania) Edina Gallovits | 4 | 6 | 4^{r} | 9 | (United States) Bethanie Mattek | 1 | 6 | 7 |
| WC | (United States) Dianne Matias | 2 | 1 | | 19 | (Belarus) Victoria Azarenka | 6 | 4 | 5 |
| 19 | (Belarus) Victoria Azarenka | 6 | 6 |

==== Tenth qualifier ====
| First round | | | | | Qualifying competition |
| 10 | (Argentina) María Emilia Salerni | 7 | 1 | 5 |
| WC | (United States) Jessica Kirkland | 5 | 6 | 7 | WC | (United States) Jessica Kirkland | 6 | 7 |
| | (Germany) Sabine Klaschka | 3 | 2 | | 23 | (United States) Lilia Osterloh | 4 | 5 |
| 23 | (United States) Lilia Osterloh | 6 | 6 |

==== Eleventh qualifier ====
| First round | | | | | Qualifying competition |
| 11 | (Ukraine) Kateryna Bondarenko | 0 | 6 | 2 |
| WC | (United States) Ahsha Rolle | 6 | 3 | 6 | WC | (United States) Ahsha Rolle | 2 | 6 | 0 |
| | (Belarus) Tatiana Poutchek | 1 | 6 | 7 | | (Belarus) Tatiana Poutchek | 6 | 4 | 6 |
| 13 | (Austria) Yvonne Meusburger | 6 | 0 | 5 |

==== Twelfth qualifier ====
| First round | | | | Qualifying competition |
| 12 | (France) Camille Pin | 6 | 6 |
| WC | (United States) Cassandra Herzberg | 0 | 1 | 12 | (France) Camille Pin | 6 | 6 |
| | (Israel) Tzipora Obziler | 0 | 4 | 15 | (Japan) Rika Fujiwara | 4 | 3 |
| 15 | (Japan) Rika Fujiwara | 6 | 6 |
