= Tatiana Golovin =

French tennis player (born 1988)

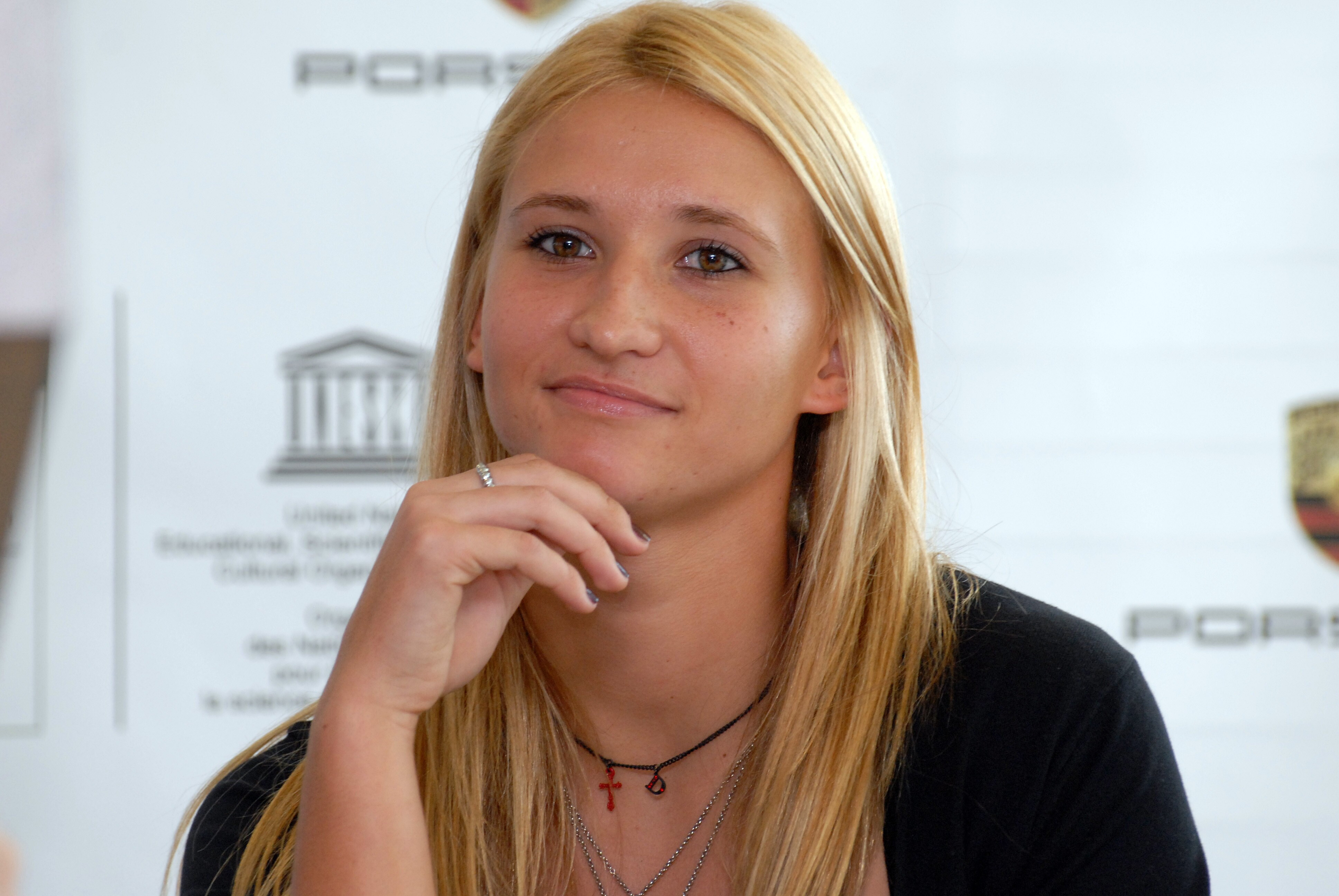
- Golovin at UNESCO Headquarters in Paris in 2007
- Country (sports): France
- Residence: New York, U.S.
- Born: 25 January 1988 (age 38) Moscow, Soviet Union
- Height: 1.75 m (5 ft 9 in)
- Turned pro: 2002
- Retired: 2008, 2019 (second retirement)
- Plays: Right-handed (two-handed backhand)
- Prize money: US$ 1,923,053

Singles
- Career record: 165–93
- Career titles: 2
- Highest ranking: No. 12 (4 February 2008)

Grand Slam singles results
- Australian Open: 4R (2004)
- French Open: 3R (2005)
- Wimbledon: 4R (2004)
- US Open: QF (2006)

Doubles
- Career record: 21–32
- Career titles: 0
- Highest ranking: No. 91 (13 August 2007)

Grand Slam doubles results
- Australian Open: 2R (2006)
- French Open: 1R (2002, 2003, 2005)
- Wimbledon: 3R (2004)
- US Open: 2R (2006)

Grand Slam mixed doubles results
- French Open: W (2004)

Tatiana Golovin (Russian: Татья́на Григóрьевна Головина́, romanized: Tatyana Grigoryevna Golovina; born 25 January 1988) is a French former professional tennis player. She won the 2004 French Open mixed-doubles event, partnering with Richard Gasquet, and reached the singles quarterfinals at the 2006 US Open, losing to the eventual champion Maria Sharapova. Her career-high singles ranking is world No. 12. In 2008, she was diagnosed with lower back inflammation and was forced to stop playing competitive tennis.

== Training ==
Born in Moscow, Golovin’s family moved to France when she was eight months old. She later spent six years at Nick Bollettieri's tennis camp in Bradenton, Florida. In her career, she was coached by former world No. 1 Mats Wilander as well as Brad Gilbert and Dean Goldfine.

== Career ==
=== 2002–03: tour debut ===
Golovin made her ITF Circuit debut at Cagnes-sur-Mer, France in 2002. She played in three more ITF events (including one semifinal) later that year. In 2003, Golovin won her first WTA Tour main-draw match at Indian Wells against No. 146 Gisela Dulko.

=== 2004–05 ===
At the Australian Open, Golovin (ranked No. 354) upset No. 14 seed Anna Smashnova in the second round and No. 23 seed Lina Krasnoroutskaya in the third round, then lost to No. 25 seed Lisa Raymond in the fourth round. It was her second Grand Slam tournament.

At Roland Garros, Golovin won the mixed doubles trophy with Richard Gasquet, as a wildcard team, defeating Cara Black/Wayne Black. At Wimbledon, she reached the fourth round, with wins over Alina Jidkova, Francesca Schiavone, and Emmanuelle Gagliardi, then lost to world No. 10, Serena Williams.

Golovin reached the semifinals at the Paris Indoors, losing to Mary Pierce, after having beaten world No. 10, Elena Dementieva for her first top 10 win. In her first grass-court main draw at Birmingham, Golovin reached her first WTA Tour singles final, which she lost to Maria Sharapova in three sets. Golovin reached her first Tier I quarterfinal in Montreal at the Rogers Cup, losing to Vera Zvonareva. Afterward, she reached the quarterfinals in Luxembourg, losing to eventual champion Alicia Molik.

Golovin was a member of the France Fed Cup team, that defeated Italy in the quarterfinal and Spain in the semifinals, then lost to Russia in the final, in which she defeated No. 5 Svetlana Kuznetsova. During the year, she debuted in the top 100 on February 16 (at No. 91), and in the top 50 on June 14 (at No. 50).

Golovin reached the final in Tokyo at the Japan Open as No. 3 seed, losing to second seed Nicole Vaidišová. She was also five-time semifinalist on four different surfaces: on hardcourt at Gold Coast, losing to Schnyder in three sets, and later that year again on hardcourt at Seoul, losing to Jelena Janković in three sets; on carpet at the Paris Indoors, which was her second straight semifinal there, losing the third set tie-break against Dinara Safina; clay at Charleston where she secured her third career top-10 victory versus No. 8 Venus Williams en route to her first Tier I semifinal, falling to Justine Henin-Hardenne in two sets; and grass at Birmingham, losing to Maria Sharapova. She made her top 20 debut (at No. 18) after her semifinal appearance at Charleston.

=== 2006–07 ===
At her first tournament of the year in Gold Coast, Golovin reached the quarterfinals, losing to finalist Flavia Pennetta in three sets. Golovin reached her third consecutive Paris Indoors semifinal, defeating Nadia Petrova in the quarterfinals. The victory over world No. 7 Petrova was the fourth top 10 win of her career. She then lost to top seed and eventual champion Amélie Mauresmo.

Golovin reached her second career Tier I semifinal at Miami, where she defeated world No. 8, Elena Dementieva, in the fourth round for her fifth career top-10 victory and 100th career singles match win. In the semifinal, Golovin overcame a 5–1 deficit and four match points while down 5–3 in second set versus Maria Sharapova, pushing the match to a third set, before she sprained her left ankle and retired at 3–6, 7–6, 3–4.

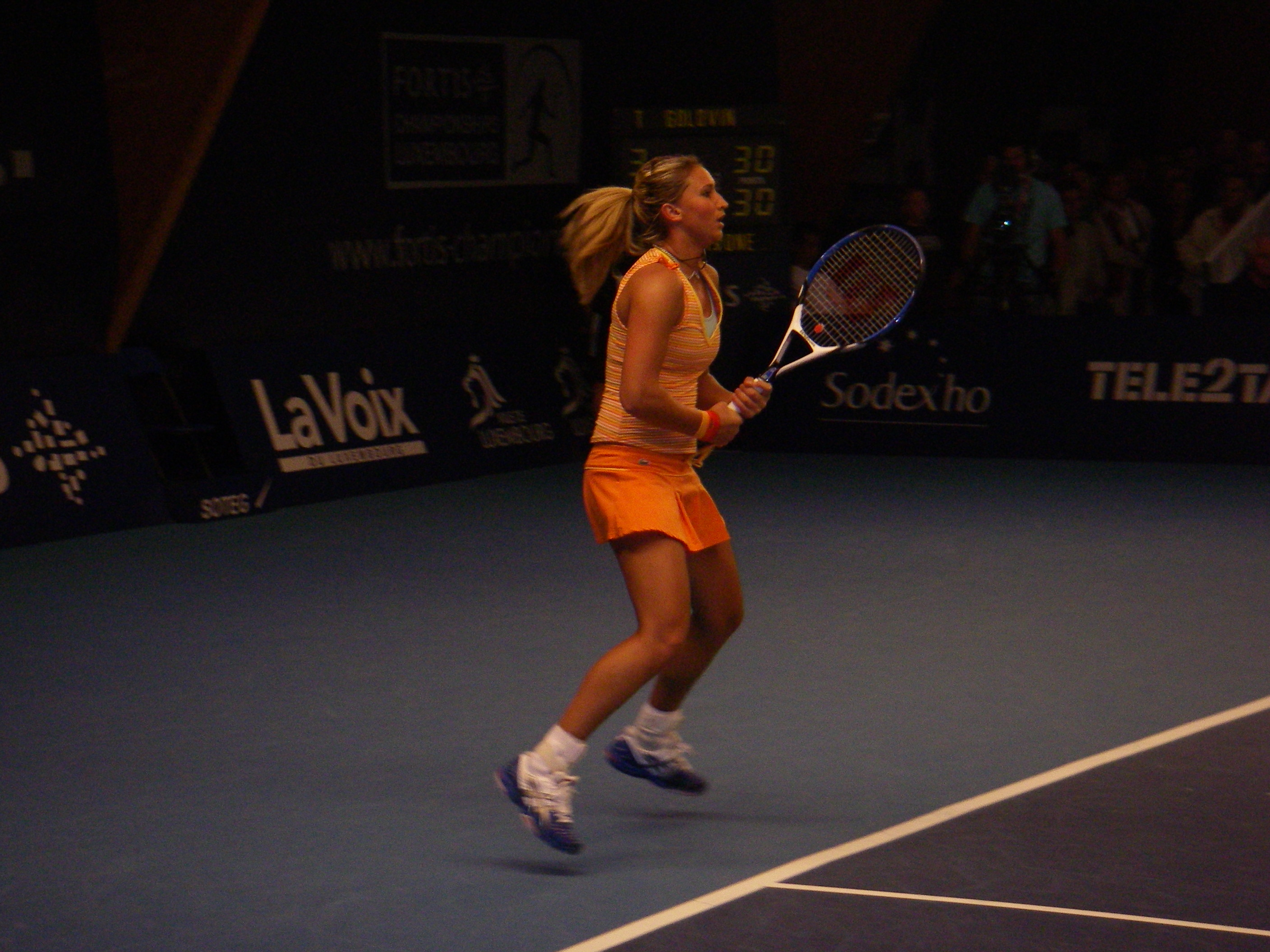
Golovin at the 2007 Luxembourg Open

Golovin's third semifinal of the season was at San Jose, where, as an unseeded player, she upset Ai Sugiyama and Anna-Lena Grönefeld on the way to losing to No. 2 seed Patty Schnyder. Golovin then reached the quarterfinals of the US Open by defeating Nadia Petrova for the second time in 2006 in the third round and Anna Chakvetadze in the fourth. She then lost to No. 3 seed and eventual champion Maria Sharapova.

Golovin reached her first final since the Japan Open Tennis Championships in 2005 at the Porsche Tennis Grand Prix in Stuttgart by defeating Elena Likhovtseva in the first round, Iveta Benešová in the second, Michaëlla Krajicek in the quarterfinals, and eighth seed Patty Schnyder in the semifinals. However, she lost in the final to Nadia Petrova.

At the Australian Open Golovin fell in the third round to 16th seed Shahar Pe'er in a three-hour match. At the Proximus Diamond Games held in Antwerp, she beat Katarina Srebotnik, fifth seed Patty Schnyder and Elena Likhovtseva en route to the semifinals, where she lost to Belgian Kim Clijsters.

On 8 April 2007, Golovin won her first WTA Tour title at the Amelia Island Championships, defeating Nadia Petrova.

Later in the year, Golovin won her second career title in Portorož, defeating Katarina Srebotnik in the final. She then competed in the Porsche Tennis Grand Prix, and reached the final losing to Justine Henin. Two weeks later, Golovin lost to Henin in the final of the Zurich Open.

=== 2008: retirement ===
Golovin entered the Australian Open as the No. 13 seed, her highest seeding in a major. She lost in the second round to Aravane Rezaï, another French player.

At the 2008 Beijing Olympics, she had partnered with Pauline Parmentier, but the team had to withdraw due to Golovin's back injury. After missing a total of four successive months due to medical concerns with her back, she eventually pulled out of the US Open. She was diagnosed with lower back inflammation and was forced to stop playing competitive tennis indefinitely.

She appeared in the 2009 Sports Illustrated Swimsuit Edition alongside Daniela Hantuchová and Maria Kirilenko in a pictorial titled "Volley of the Dolls".

During this time Golovin forged a career in broadcasting, working for French television.

=== 2019–20: return to professional tennis ===
On 13 September 2019, Golovin announced on BeIN Sports that she had been working hard to come back to the WTA Tour next season. But that things had been progressing so well, she was considering moving her return date up to mid-October.

== Personal life ==
Golovin was born in Moscow but moved to Paris with her parents when she was eight months old, and attained French citizenship. She speaks fluent French, English and Russian. She has two sisters, Olga and Oxana.

Tatiana Golovin is today a member of the ‘Champions for Peace’ club, a group of 54 famous elite athletes committed to serving peace in the world through sport, created by Peace and Sport, a Monaco-based international organization.

She also works for French television, as a tennis commentator.

On March 22, 2015, she announced that she was expecting a child with her partner, French rugby player Hugo Bonneval. Daughter Anastasia was born July 10, 2015. Golovin and Bonneval added a son to the family in November 2017.

== Performance timelines ==
Key
| W | F | SF | QF | #R | RR | Q# | P# | DNQ | A | Z# | PO | G | S | B | NMS | NTI | P | NH |

(W) winner; (F) finalist; (SF) semifinalist; (QF) quarterfinalist; (#R) rounds 4, 3, 2, 1; (RR) round-robin stage; (Q#) qualification round; (P#) preliminary round; (DNQ) did not qualify; (A) absent; (Z#) Davis/Fed Cup Zonal Group (with number indication) or (PO) play-off; (G) gold, (S) silver or (B) bronze Olympic/Paralympic medal; (NMS) not a Masters tournament; (NTI) not a Tier I tournament; (P) postponed; (NH) not held; (SR) strike rate (events won / competed); (W–L) win–loss record.
To avoid confusion and double counting, these charts are updated at the conclusion of a tournament or when the player's participation has ended.

Only main-draw results in WTA Tour, Grand Slam tournaments, Fed Cup and Olympic Games are included in win–loss records.

=== Singles ===
| Tournament | 2002 | 2003 | 2004 | 2005 | 2006 | 2007 | 2008 | SR | W–L | Win% |
|---|---|---|---|---|---|---|---|---|---|---|
Grand Slam
| Australian Open | A | A | 4R | 2R | 1R | 3R | 2R | 0 / 5 | 7–5 | 58% |
| French Open | Q2 | 1R | 1R | 3R | 1R | A | A | 0 / 4 | 2–4 | 33% |
| Wimbledon | A | A | 4R | 1R | 2R | 2R | A | 0 / 4 | 5–4 | 56% |
| US Open | A | A | 3R | 3R | QF | 1R | A | 0 / 4 | 8–4 | 67% |
| Win–loss | 0–0 | 0–1 | 8–4 | 5–4 | 5–4 | 3–3 | 1–1 | 0 / 17 | 22–17 | 56% |
WTA Tier I
| Indian Wells Open | A | 2R | 2R | 4R | 3R | QF | A | 0 / 5 | 8–5 | 62% |
| Miami Open | A | 1R | 4R | 4R | SF | 3R | A | 0 / 5 | 10–5 | 67% |
| Charleston Open | A | A | A | SF | A | QF | A | 0 / 2 | 7–2 | 78% |
| German Open | A | A | 1R | A | A | A | 1R | 0 / 2 | 0–2 | 0% |
| Italian Open | A | A | 2R | 1R | A | A | A | 0 / 2 | 1–2 | 33% |
| San Diego Open | NMS | | A | 1R | 1R | 3R | A | 0 / 3 | 2–3 | 40% |
| Canadian Open | A | A | QF | 2R | 1R | SF | A | 0 / 4 | 8–4 | 67% |
| Pan Pacific Open | A | A | A | A | 1R | A | A | 0 / 1 | 0–1 | 0% |
| Zurich Open | A | A | 1R | 1R | 2R | F | A | 0 / 4 | 5–4 | 56% |
| Win–loss | 0–0 | 1–2 | 8–6 | 9–7 | 6–6 | 17–6 | 0–1 | 0 / 28 | 41–28 | 59% |
Career statistics
| Tournaments | 0 | 4 | 15 | 22 | 18 | 19 | 4 | Career total: 82 | | |
| Titles | 0 | 0 | 0 | 0 | 0 | 2 | 0 | Career total: 2 | | |
| Finals | 0 | 0 | 1 | 1 | 1 | 4 | 0 | Career total: 7 | | |
| Overall win–loss | 0–0 | 1–4 | 29–16 | 33–22 | 26–19 | 46–18 | 2–4 | 2 / 82 | 137–83 | 62% |
| Year-end ranking | 375 | 345 | 27 | 24 | 22 | 13 | 251 | $1,924,323 | | |

=== Doubles ===
| Tournament | 2002 | 2003 | 2004 | 2005 | 2006 | 2007 | SR | W–L | Win% |
|---|---|---|---|---|---|---|---|---|---|
Grand Slam
| Australian Open | A | A | A | A | 2R | 1R | 0 / 2 | 1–2 | 33% |
| French Open | 1R | 1R | A | 1R | A | A | 0 / 3 | 0–3 | 0% |
| Wimbledon | A | A | 3R | A | A | A | 0 / 1 | 2–1 | 67% |
| US Open | A | A | A | 1R | 2R | A | 0 / 2 | 1–2 | 33% |
| Win–loss | 0–1 | 0–1 | 2–1 | 0–2 | 1–1 | 0–1 | 0 / 8 | 4–8 | 33% |
WTA Tier I
| Indian Wells Open | A | A | Q1 | 1R | 1R | A | 0 / 2 | 0–2 | 0% |
| Miami Open | A | A | 1R | A | 1R | QF | 0 / 3 | 2–3 | 40% |
| Charleston Open | A | A | A | 1R | A | A | 0 / 1 | 0–1 | 0% |
| San Diego Open | A | A | A | 2R | 1R | QF | 0 / 3 | 3–3 | 50% |
| Canadian Open | A | A | 2R | 2R | 1R | A | 0 / 3 | 2–3 | 40% |
| Zurich Open | A | A | SF | A | A | A | 0 / 1 | 1–1 | 50% |
| Win–loss | 0–0 | 0–0 | 2–3 | 2–4 | 0–4 | 4–2 | 0 / 13 | 8–13 | 38% |
Career statistics
| Tournaments | 1 | 2 | 5 | 8 | 7 | 5 | Career total: 28 | | |
| Overall win–loss | 0–1 | 0–2 | 4–6 | 2–8 | 7–6 | 5–5 | 0 / 28 | 18–28 | 39% |
| Year-end ranking | 392 | 788 | 120 | 278 | 124 | 126 | | | |

== Grand Slam tournament finals ==
=== Mixed doubles: 1 (title) ===
| Result | Year | Championship | Surface | Partner | Opponents | Score |
|---|---|---|---|---|---|---|
| Win | 2004 | French Open | Clay | (France) Richard Gasquet | (Zimbabwe) Cara Black (Zimbabwe) Wayne Black | 6–3, 6–4 |

== WTA Tier I finals ==
=== Singles: 1 (runner-up) ===
| Result | Year | Tournament | Surface | Opponent | Score |
|---|---|---|---|---|---|
| Loss | 2007 | Zurich Open | Hard (i) | (Belgium) Justine Henin | 4–6, 4–6 |

== WTA Tour finals ==
=== Singles: 7 (2 titles, 5 runner-ups) ===
Legend
WTA Tier I (0–1)
WTA Tier II (1–2)
WTA Tier III, IV, V (1–2)

| Result | W–L | Date | Tournament | Tier | Surface | Opponent | Score |
|---|---|---|---|---|---|---|---|
| Loss | 0–1 | Jun 2004 | Birmingham Classic, UK | Tier III | Grass | (Russia) Maria Sharapova | 6–4, 2–6, 1–6 |
| Loss | 0–2 | Oct 2005 | Japan Open | Tier III | Hard (i) | (Czech Republic) Nicole Vaidišová | 6–7^{4}, 2–3 ret. |
| Loss | 0–3 | Oct 2006 | Stuttgart Open, Germany | Tier II | Hard (i) | (Russia) Nadia Petrova | 3–6, 6–7^{4} |
| Win | 1–3 | Apr 2007 | Amelia Island Championships, US | Tier II | Clay | (Russia) Nadia Petrova | 6–2, 6–1 |
| Win | 2–3 | Sep 2007 | Slovenia Open | Tier IV | Hard | (Slovenia) Katarina Srebotnik | 2–6, 6–4, 6–4 |
| Loss | 2–4 | Oct 2007 | Stuttgart Open, Germany | Tier II | Hard (i) | (Belgium) Justine Henin | 6–2, 2–6, 1–6 |
| Loss | 2–5 | Oct 2007 | Zurich Open, Switzerland | Tier I | Hard (i) | (Belgium) Justine Henin | 4–6, 4–6 |

== Top-10 wins ==
| # | Player | Rank | Event | Surface | Rd | Score | TGR |
|---|---|---|---|---|---|---|---|
2004
| 1. | (Russia) Elena Dementieva | No. 10 | Open GdF Suez, France | Carpet | QF | 6–4, 6–4 | No. 135 |
| 2. | (Russia) Svetlana Kuznetsova | No. 5 | Fed Cup | Carpet | RR | 6–4, 6–1 | No. 27 |
2005
| 3. | (United States) Venus Williams | No. 8 | Charleston Open, United States | Clay | 3R | 7–5, 6–4 | No. 25 |
2006
| 4. | (Russia) Nadia Petrova | No. 7 | Open GDF Suez, France | Carpet | QF | 3–6, 7–6^{(9–7)}, 6–3 | No. 24 |
| 5. | (Russia) Elena Dementieva | No. 8 | Miami Open, United States | Hard | 4R | 6–2, 6–1 | No. 24 |
| 6. | (Russia) Nadia Petrova | No. 6 | US Open, United States | Hard | 3R | 7–5, 6–7^{(4–7)}, 6–3 | No. 26 |
| 7. | (Switzerland) Patty Schnyder | No. 9 | Stuttgart Open, Germany | Hard | SF | 6–1, 5–7, 7–5 | No. 25 |
2007
| 8. | (Russia) Nadia Petrova | No. 7 | Indian Wells Open, United States | Hard | 4R | 6–2, 1–0 ret. | No. 19 |
| 9. | (Russia) Nadia Petrova | No. 7 | Amelia Island Championships, US | Clay | F | 6–2, 6–1 | No. 20 |
| 10. | (Russia) Svetlana Kuznetsova | No. 5 | Canadian Open | Hard | QF | 2–6, 7–5, 6–1 | No. 19 |
| 11. | (Russia) Anna Chakvetadze | No. 6 | Stuttgart Open, Germany | Hard | 2R | 7–6^{(7–3)}, 6–1 | No. 19 |
| 12. | (Russia) Svetlana Kuznetsova | No. 2 | Stuttgart Open, Germany | Hard | SF | 7–6^{(7–3)}, 6–1 | No. 19 |
| 13. | (Serbia) Ana Ivanovic | No. 4 | Zurich Open, Switzerland | Hard | 2R | 6–3, 6–1 | No. 18 |

Awards
| Preceded by (Russia) Maria Sharapova | WTA Newcomer of the Year; 2004 | Succeeded by (India) Sania Mirza |
