= 2007 Pacific Life Open – Men's singles =

Men's singles
- 2007 Pacific Life Open

Final
- Champion: (Spain) Rafael Nadal
- Runner-up: (Serbia) Novak Djokovic
- Score: 6–2, 7–5

Details
- Draw: 96
- Seeds: 32

Events
Singles	men	women
Doubles	men	women
- Indian Wells Masters

Rafael Nadal defeated Novak Djokovic in the final, 6–2, 7–5 to win the men's singles tennis title at the 2007 Indian Wells Masters. He did not lose a single set in the entire tournament. By reaching the final, Djokovic entered the world's top 10 in rankings for the first time in his career.

Roger Federer was the three-time defending champion, but lost in the second round to Guillermo Cañas.

== Seeds ==
All thirty-two seeds received a bye into the second round.

1. (Switzerland) Roger Federer (second round)
2. (Spain) Rafael Nadal (champion)
3. (United States) Andy Roddick (semifinals)
4. (Russia) Nikolay Davydenko (fourth round)
5. (Chile) Fernando González (fourth round)
6. (United States) James Blake (third round)
7. (Spain) Tommy Robredo (second round)
8. (Croatia) Ivan Ljubičić (quarterfinals)
9. (Germany) Tommy Haas (quarterfinals)
10. (Argentina) David Nalbandian (fourth round)
11. (Czech Republic) Tomáš Berdych (second round)
12. (Serbia) Novak Djokovic (final)
13. (United Kingdom) Andy Murray (semifinals)
14. (Spain) David Ferrer (quarterfinals)
15. (France) Richard Gasquet (fourth round)
16. (Russia) Mikhail Youzhny (second round)
17. (Cyprus) Marcos Baghdatis (second round)
18. (Finland) Jarkko Nieminen (third round)
19. (Australia) Lleyton Hewitt (second round)
20. (Russia) Dmitry Tursunov (second round)
21. (United States) Mardy Fish (second round)
22. (Spain) Juan Carlos Ferrero (fourth round)
23. (Russia) Marat Safin (second round)
24. (Slovakia) Dominik Hrbatý (second round)
25. (Czech Republic) Radek Štěpánek (second round)
26. (Sweden) Robin Söderling (third round)
27. (Austria) Jürgen Melzer (second round)
28. (Argentina) Agustín Calleri (second round)
29. (Belgium) ~~Xavier Malisse~~ (withdrew)
30. (Argentina) Juan Ignacio Chela (quarterfinals)
31. (Spain) Nicolás Almagro (second round)
32. (Spain) Fernando Verdasco (third round)
33. (Belgium) Olivier Rochus (third round)

== Draw ==
Key

- Q = Qualifier
- WC = Wild card
- LL = Lucky loser
- Alt = Alternate
- ITF = ITF entry
- PR = Protected ranking
- SR = Special ranking
- SE = Special exempt
- JE = Junior exempt
- JR = Junior Accelerator Programme entrant
- CO = College Accelerator Programme entrant
- NG = Next Gen Accelerator Program entrant
- w/o = Walkover
- r = Retired
- d = Defaulted

=== Finals ===
Quarterfinals
14	(Spain) David Ferrer	3	4
12	(Serbia) Novak Djokovic	6	6
13	(United Kingdom) Andy Murray	3	6	7^{10}
9	(Germany) Tommy Haas	6	3	6^{8}
8	(Croatia) Ivan Ljubičić	6^{7}	6^{8}
3	(United States) Andy Roddick	7^{9}	7^{10}
30	(Argentina) Juan Ignacio Chela	5	5
2	(Spain) Rafael Nadal	7	7

Semifinals
12	(Serbia) Novak Djokovic	6	6
13	(United Kingdom) Andy Murray	2	3
3	(United States) Andy Roddick	4	3
2	(Spain) Rafael Nadal	6	6

Finals
12	(Serbia) Novak Djokovic	2	5
2	(Spain) Rafael Nadal	6	7

=== Top half ===
==== Section 1 ====
First round
LL	(Argentina) G Cañas	6	6
(Czech Republic) J Hájek	1	1
(Spain) C Moyà	6	6
Q	(Chile) P Capdeville	4	4
(Serbia) J Tipsarević	6	6
(Thailand) P Srichaphan	4	2
(Peru) L Horna	6	4	6
(Italy) F Volandri	0	6	2

Second round
1	(Switzerland) R Federer	5	2
LL	(Argentina) G Cañas	7	6
(Spain) C Moyà	6	6
25	(Czech Republic) R Štěpánek	3	4
19	(Australia) L Hewitt	6^{3}	6	2
(Serbia) J Tipsarević	7^{7}	4	6
(Peru) L Horna	3	1
14	(Spain) D Ferrer	6	6

Third round
LL	(Argentina) G Cañas	4	4
(Spain) C Moyà	6	6
(Serbia) J Tipsarević	1	3
14	(Spain) D Ferrer	6	6

Fourth round
(Spain) C Moyà	6	2	3
14	(Spain) D Ferrer	1	6	6

==== Section 2 ====
First round
(United States) R Ginepri	7	7^{7}
WC	(United States) R Kendrick	5	6^{3}
(Russia) E Korolev	6^{6}	7	6
(Germany) S Greul	7^{8}	5	1
(France) G Monfils	6	3	5
(France) J Benneteau	3	6	7
(Denmark) K Pless	6^{6}	4
(France) F Serra	7^{8}	6

Second round
12	(Serbia) N Djokovic	6	6
(United States) R Ginepri	4	4
(Russia) E Korolev	6	6^{3}	6
20	(Russia) D Tursunov	4	7^{7}	3
27	(Austria) J Melzer	4	4
(France) J Benneteau	6	6
(France) F Serra	3	6^{2}
6	(United States) J Blake	6	7^{7}

Third round
12	(Serbia) N Djokovic	6	6
(Russia) E Korolev	2	1
(France) J Benneteau	6	7^{7}
6	(United States) J Blake	2	6^{1}

Fourth round
12	(Serbia) N Djokovic	6	6
(France) J Benneteau	3	1

==== Section 3 ====
First round
(Belgium) C Rochus	2	4
WC	(United States) S Querrey	6	6
(United Kingdom) T Henman	5	6	5
(Czech Republic) J Hernych	7	3	7
(Argentina) J Mónaco	6	3	6^{2}
(France) N Mahut	3	6	7^{7}
Q	(Czech Republic) L Dlouhý	5	3
Q	(South Africa) W Moodie	7	6

Second round
4	(Russia) N Davydenko	2	7^{8}	6
WC	(United States) S Querrey	6	6^{6}	2
(Czech Republic) J Hernych	6	6
28	(Argentina) A Calleri	3	3
23	(Russia) M Safin	3	6	0
(France) N Mahut	6	4	6
Q	(South Africa) W Moodie	3	3
13	(United Kingdom) A Murray	6	6

Third round
4	(Russia) N Davydenko	6	6
(Czech Republic) J Hernych	3	1
(France) N Mahut	1	3
13	(United Kingdom) A Murray	6	6

Fourth round
4	(Russia) N Davydenko	6^{3}	4
13	(United Kingdom) A Murray	7^{7}	6

==== Section 4 ====
First round
Q	(Czech Republic) T Zíb	4	4
Q	(France) M Llodra	6	6
(Belgium) K Vliegen	3	4
Q	(Russia) T Gabashvili	6	6
(United States) J Gimelstob	2	1
(Italy) D Bracciali	6	6
(Canada) F Dancevic	6	6^{5}	6
Q	(Germany) A Waske	1	7^{7}	4

Second round
9	(Germany) T Haas	6	6
Q	(France) M Llodra	4	1
Q	(Russia) T Gabashvili	7	6
24	(Slovakia) D Hrbatý	5	3
26	(Sweden) R Söderling	6	6
(Italy) D Bracciali	3	4
(Canada) F Dancevic	6^{6}	6	5
5	(Chile) F González	7^{8}	1	7

Third round
9	(Germany) T Haas	6	6
Q	(Russia) T Gabashvili	0	3
26	(Sweden) R Söderling	6^{4}	6^{2}
5	(Chile) F González	7^{7}	7^{7}

Fourth round
9	(Germany) T Haas	6	6
5	(Chile) F González	3	2

=== Bottom half ===
==== Section 5 ====
First round
(Germany) B Becker	6^{1}	3
Q	(Colombia) A Falla	7^{7}	6
(Belarus) M Mirnyi	4	6^{7}
(Sweden) T Johansson	6	7^{9}
(Spain) A Martín	4	1
(France) P-H Mathieu	6	6
(Germany) P Kohlschreiber	6	7
(South Korea) H-T Lee	4	5

Second round
8	(Croatia) I Ljubičić	6^{4}	6	6
Q	(Colombia) A Falla	7^{7}	4	4
(Sweden) T Johansson	7^{7}	7
31	(Spain) N Almagro	6^{4}	5
21	(United States) M Fish	6^{4}	6	6^{5}
(France) P-H Mathieu	7^{7}	4	7^{7}
(Germany) P Kohlschreiber	6	5	6^{1}
10	(Argentina) D Nalbandian	1	7	7^{7}

Third round
8	(Croatia) I Ljubičić	6	6
(Sweden) T Johansson	1	4
(France) P-H Mathieu	7^{7}	2	0
10	(Argentina) D Nalbandian	6^{3}	6	6

Fourth round
8	(Croatia) I Ljubičić	2	6	6
10	(Argentina) D Nalbandian	6	4	2

==== Section 6 ====
First round
WC	(Brazil) G Kuerten	6^{5}	2
(Argentina) J M del Potro	7^{7}	6
(Argentina) S Roitman	3	6^{3}
(United States) P Goldstein	6	7^{7}
(Austria) S Koubek	1	2
(United States) V Spadea	6	6
(Spain) F López	6	7^{8}
Q	(Australia) C Guccione	2	6^{6}

Second round
15	(France) R Gasquet	7^{7}	6
(Argentina) J M del Potro	6^{2}	2
(United States) P Goldstein	6	4	4
18	(Finland) J Nieminen	1	6	6
33	(Belgium) O Rochus	6	6
(United States) V Spadea	1	4
(Spain) F López	6^{5}	4
3	(United States) A Roddick	7^{7}	6

Third round
15	(France) R Gasquet	6	1	6
18	(Finland) J Nieminen	3	6	3
33	(Belgium) O Rochus	3	6^{5}
3	(United States) A Roddick	6	7^{7}

Fourth round
15	(France) R Gasquet	6^{3}	3
3	(United States) A Roddick	7^{7}	6

==== Section 7 ====
First round
(France) G Simon	6	4	7
Q	(Germany) R Schüttler	1	6	5
(Germany) B Phau	6	4	6^{4}
(Sweden) J Björkman	3	6	7^{7}
(Spain) G García López	6	7^{7}
(Chile) N Massú	3	6^{5}
WC	(United States) M Russell	6	7
(France) M Gicquel	3	5

Second round
7	(Spain) T Robredo	7^{7}	3	0
(France) G Simon	6^{0}	6	6
(Sweden) J Björkman	3	6	4
30	(Argentina) J I Chela	6	3	6
17	(Cyprus) M Baghdatis	5	5
(Spain) G García López	7	7
WC	(United States) M Russell	7^{7}	6
11	(Czech Republic) T Berdych	6^{2}	4

Third round
(France) G Simon	2	2
30	(Argentina) J I Chela	6	6
(Spain) G García López	1	5
WC	(United States) M Russell	6	7

Fourth round
30	(Argentina) J I Chela	6	6
WC	(United States) M Russell	4	4

==== Section 8 ====
First round
(France) S Grosjean	4	4
(Argentina) J Acasuso	6	6
(Germany) F Mayer	6	6
(Russia) I Kunitsyn	1	2
Q	(Italy) A Seppi	6	6
WC	(United States) A Kuznetsov	4	4
Q	(Serbia) V Troicki	7^{7}	4	2
(France) A Clément	6^{3}	6	6

Second round
16	(Russia) M Youzhny	6^{9}	4
(Argentina) J Acasuso	7^{11}	6
(Germany) F Mayer	0	2
22	(Spain) J C Ferrero	6	6
32	(Spain) F Verdasco	7^{7}	6
Q	(Italy) A Seppi	6^{5}	3
(France) A Clément	3	6^{3}
2	(Spain) R Nadal	6	7^{7}

Third round
(Argentina) J Acasuso	6	6^{8}	4
22	(Spain) J C Ferrero	4	7^{10}	6
32	(Spain) F Verdasco	4	4
2	(Spain) R Nadal	6	6

Fourth round
22	(Spain) J C Ferrero	1	1
2	(Spain) R Nadal	6	6
