= 2006 NASDAQ-100 Open – Women's singles =

Women's singles
- 2006 NASDAQ-100 Open

Final
- Champion: (Russia) Svetlana Kuznetsova
- Runner-up: (Russia) Maria Sharapova
- Score: 6–4, 6–3

Details
- Draw: 96
- Seeds: 32

Events
Singles	men	women
Doubles	men	women
← 2005 ·	NASDAQ-100 Open	· 2007 →

Svetlana Kuznetsova defeated Maria Sharapova in the final, 6–4, 6–3 to win the women's singles tennis title at the 2006 Miami Open. It was her first Tier I title and sixth overall, and her first title of any kind since September 2004.

Kim Clijsters was the defending champion, but lost in the second round to Jill Craybas.

== Seeds ==
All seeds received a bye into the second round.

1. (France) Amélie Mauresmo (semifinals)
2. (Belgium) Kim Clijsters (second round)
3. (Belgium) Justine Henin-Hardenne (second round)
4. (Russia) Maria Sharapova (final)
5. (Russia) Nadia Petrova (quarterfinals)
6. (Russia) Elena Dementieva (fourth round)
7. (Switzerland) Patty Schnyder (fourth round, withdrew)
8. (United States) Venus Williams (withdrew due to a right elbow ligament strain)
9. (Italy) Francesca Schiavone (second round)
10. (Russia) Anastasia Myskina (quarterfinals)
11. (Czech Republic) Nicole Vaidišová (withdrew due to a right shoulder injury)
12. (Russia) Svetlana Kuznetsova (champion)
13. (Slovakia) Daniela Hantuchová (third round)
14. (Serbia and Montenegro) Ana Ivanovic (fourth round)
15. (Russia) Elena Likhovtseva (third round)
16. (Germany) Anna-Lena Grönefeld (third round)
17. (Italy) Flavia Pennetta (withdrew due to a right ankle sprain)
18. (Russia) Dinara Safina (second round)
19. (France) Nathalie Dechy (second round)
20. (Russia) Maria Kirilenko (fourth round)
21. (Japan) Ai Sugiyama (quarterfinals)
22. (France) Tatiana Golovin (semifinals, retired)
23. (Spain) Anabel Medina Garrigues (second round)
24. (Switzerland) Martina Hingis (third round)
25. (Serbia and Montenegro) Jelena Janković (second round)
26. (Argentina) Gisela Dulko (second round)
27. (Czech Republic) Klára Koukalová (third round)
28. (Slovenia) Katarina Srebotnik (third round)
29. (Czech Republic) Lucie Šafářová (second round)
30. (France) Marion Bartoli (third round)
31. (Israel) Shahar Pe'er (second round)
32. (Sweden) Sofia Arvidsson (fourth round)
33. (Czech Republic) Květa Peschke (second round)

== Draw ==
=== Key ===
- Q = Qualifier
- WC = Wild card
- LL = Lucky loser
- Alt = Alternate
- SE = Special exempt
- PR = Protected ranking
- ITF = ITF entry
- JE = Junior exempt
- w/o = Walkover
- r = Retired
- d = Defaulted
- SR = Special ranking

=== Finals ===
Quarterfinals
1	(France) Amélie Mauresmo	6	6
5	(Russia) Nadia Petrova	3	1
21	(Japan) Ai Sugiyama	0	6^{4}
12	(Russia) Svetlana Kuznetsova	6	7
10	(Russia) Anastasia Myskina	3	3
4	(Russia) Maria Sharapova	6	6
22	(France) Tatiana Golovin	3	6	6
(China) Zheng Jie	6	3	2

Semifinals
1	(France) Amélie Mauresmo	1	4
12	(Russia) Svetlana Kuznetsova	6	6
4	(Russia) Maria Sharapova	6	6^{5}	4
22	(France) Tatiana Golovin	3	7	3^{r}

Final
12	(Russia) Svetlana Kuznetsova	6	6
4	(Russia) Maria Sharapova	4	3

=== Top half ===
==== Section 1 ====
First round
(Australia) S Stosur	6	6
WC	(Netherlands) B Schultz-McCarthy	3	3
(Japan) A Nakamura	6	1	2
Q	(Belarus) A Yakimova	1	6	6
Q	(Ukraine) A Bondarenko	6	6
LL	(Bulgaria) T Pironkova	2	2
(Czech Republic) I Benešová	6^{2}	6	7
WC	(Croatia) S Ančić	7	1	6^{2}

Second round
1	(France) A Mauresmo	6	6
(Australia) S Stosur	0	0
Q	(Belarus) A Yakimova	1	2
30	(France) M Bartoli	6	6
23	(Spain) A Medina Garrigues	6	2	3
Q	(Ukraine) A Bondarenko	4	6	6
(Czech Republic) I Benešová	6^{1}	6	2
14	(Serbia and Montenegro) A Ivanovic	7	3	6

Third round
1	(France) A Mauresmo	6	6
30	(France) M Bartoli	4	0
Q	(Ukraine) A Bondarenko	3	7	3
14	(Serbia and Montenegro) A Ivanovic	6	5	6

Fourth round
1	(France) A Mauresmo	7	6
14	(Serbia and Montenegro) A Ivanovic	5	2

==== Section 2 ====
First round
(Venezuela) M Vento-Kabchi	6	3	5
(Czech Republic) Z Ondrášková	3	6	7
Q	(Greece) E Daniilidou	6	7
WC	(United States) S Perry	3	5
(United States) A Harkleroad	5	7	5
WC	(United States) J Jackson	7	6^{3}	7
(Spain) M Sánchez Lorenzo	6	1	6
(Italy) R Vinci	3	6	3

Second round
13	(Slovakia) D Hantuchová	6	5	6
(Czech Republic) Z Ondrášková	3	7	3
Q	(Greece) E Daniilidou	6	6
18	(Russia) D Safina	4	4
26	(Argentina) G Dulko	7	2	4
WC	(United States) J Jackson	5	6	6
(Spain) M Sánchez Lorenzo	2	1
5	(Russia) N Petrova	6	6

Third round
13	(Slovakia) D Hantuchová	3	6	2
Q	(Greece) E Daniilidou	6	4	6
WC	(United States) J Jackson	6	0	0
5	(Russia) N Petrova	4	6	6

Fourth round
Q	(Greece) E Daniilidou	2	0
5	(Russia) N Petrova	6	6

==== Section 3 ====
First round
(United States) M Shaughnessy	2	7	6
(Italy) M Santangelo	6	5	4
Q	(France) S Foretz	6	6
Q	(Venezuela) M Sequera	4	3
(Italy) A Serra Zanetti	1	3
(Germany) J Schruff	6	6
(United States) A Frazier	4	2
(China) S Peng	6	6

Second round
3	(Belgium) J Henin-Hardenne	5	4
(United States) M Shaughnessy	7	6
Q	(France) S Foretz	4	5
32	(Sweden) S Arvidsson	6	7
21	(Japan) A Sugiyama	6	6
(Germany) J Schruff	1	1
(China) S Peng	3	6	2
15	(Russia) E Likhovtseva	6	4	6

Third round
(United States) M Shaughnessy	7	3	6^{5}
32	(Sweden) S Arvidsson	5	6	7
21	(Japan) A Sugiyama	3	7	6
15	(Russia) E Likhovtseva	6	5	0

Fourth round
32	(Sweden) S Arvidsson	7	3	2
21	(Japan) A Sugiyama	6^{4}	6	6

==== Section 4 ====
First round
(Russia) V Dushevina	4	2
(Russia) V Zvonareva	6	6
WC	(United States) A Haynes	2	4
Q	(China) T Sun	6	6
LL	(United States) M Washington	6	6
(United States) L Raymond	1	4
(Argentina) M Díaz Oliva	6	6
(Puerto Rico) K Brandi	4	0

Second round
12	(Russia) S Kuznetsova	6	6
(Russia) V Zvonareva	2	2
Q	(China) T Sun	3	2
24	(Switzerland) M Hingis	6	6
28	(Slovenia) K Srebotnik	6	6
LL	(United States) M Washington	3	0
(Argentina) M Díaz Oliva	3	2
7	(Switzerland) P Schnyder	6	6

Third round
12	(Russia) S Kuznetsova	3	6	7
24	(Switzerland) M Hingis	6	1	6^{9}
28	(Slovenia) K Srebotnik	6^{3}	3
7	(Switzerland) P Schnyder	7	6

Fourth round
12	(Russia) S Kuznetsova	w/o
7	(Switzerland) P Schnyder

=== Bottom half ===
==== Section 5 ====
First round
WC	(Russia) A Kleybanova	5	2
(France) V Razzano	7	6
(Russia) A Chakvetadze	1	6	6
(Croatia) K Šprem	6	3	3
Q	(Spain) L Pous Tió	6^{3}	3
Q	(Belarus) V Azarenka	7	6
(Russia) E Bychkova	6	6
(Colombia) C Castaño	4	1

Second round
LL	(Slovakia) M Suchá	3	3
(France) V Razzano	6	6
(Russia) A Chakvetadze	6	6
31	(Israel) S Pe'er	1	2
25	(Serbia and Montenegro) J Janković	3	1
Q	(Belarus) V Azarenka	6	6
(Russia) E Bychkova	6^{2}	1
10	(Russia) A Myskina	7	6

Third round
(France) V Razzano	4	0
(Russia) A Chakvetadze	6	6
Q	(Belarus) V Azarenka	3	5
10	(Russia) A Myskina	6	7

Fourth round
(Russia) A Chakvetadze	3	2
10	(Russia) A Myskina	6	6

==== Section 6 ====
First round
Q	(China) M Yuan	4	4
(Poland) M Domachowska	6	6
(Austria) S Bammer	6	1	5
WC	(United States) V King	0	6	7
Q	(Italy) ME Camerin	4	6	6
(Finland) E Laine	6	2	3
(Japan) A Morigami	1	2
(China) N Li	6	6

Second round
LL	(Ukraine) V Kutuzova	6	6
(Poland) M Domachowska	3	2
WC	(United States) V King	2	1
20	(Russia) M Kirilenko	6	6
33	(Czech Republic) K Peschke	2	5
Q	(Italy) ME Camerin	6	7
(China) N Li	2	4
4	(Russia) M Sharapova	6	6

Third round
LL	(Ukraine) V Kutuzova	1	4
20	(Russia) M Kirilenko	6	6
Q	(Italy) ME Camerin	2	6^{2}
4	(Russia) M Sharapova	6	7

Fourth round
20	(Russia) M Kirilenko	6	4	1
4	(Russia) M Sharapova	3	6	6

==== Section 7 ====
First round
(India) S Mirza	6^{6}	6	6^{8}
WC	(Georgia (country)) A Tatishvili	7	1	7
(China) Z Yan	3	7	1
(Netherlands) M Krajicek	6	5	6
(Israel) A Smashnova	3	r
(Spain) L Domínguez Lino	5
(Russia) E Vesnina	6	7
(France) É Loit	3	6^{4}

Second round
6	(Russia) E Dementieva	6	6
WC	(Georgia (country)) A Tatishvili	3	1
(Netherlands) M Krajicek	6	6
29	(Czech Republic) L Šafářová	3	4
22	(France) T Golovin	7	6
(Spain) L Domínguez Lino	5	0
(Russia) E Vesnina	6	6
9	(Italy) F Schiavone	2	3

Third round
6	(Russia) E Dementieva	6	6
(Netherlands) M Krajicek	0	1
22	(France) T Golovin	6	6
(Russia) E Vesnina	2	3

Fourth round
6	(Russia) E Dementieva	2	1
22	(France) T Golovin	6	6

==== Section 8 ====
First round
(Japan) S Asagoe	7	2
(Spain) N Llagostera Vives	6^{2}	3^{r}
Q	(Uzbekistan) V Lepchenko	5	3
(China) J Zheng	7	6
Q	(Italy) T Garbin	7	1	6
LL	(Spain) V Ruano Pascual	6^{1}	6	4
(United States) J Craybas	6	4	6
(Croatia) J Kostanić	3	6	1

Second round
16	(Germany) A-L Grönefeld	6	4	6
(Japan) S Asagoe	4	6	3
(China) J Zheng	2	7	6
19	(France) N Dechy	6	6^{3}	1
27	(Czech Republic) K Koukalová	2	7	6
Q	(Italy) T Garbin	6	5	1
(United States) J Craybas	7	3	7
2	(Belgium) K Clijsters	5	6	5

Third round
16	(Germany) A-L Grönefeld	4	5
(China) J Zheng	6	7
27	(Czech Republic) K Koukalová	1	2
(United States) J Craybas	6	6

Fourth round
(China) J Zheng	2	6	6
(United States) J Craybas	6	2	3
