= 2006 US Open – Women's singles =

Women's singles
- 2006 US Open

Final
- Champion: (Russia) Maria Sharapova
- Runner-up: (Belgium) Justine Henin-Hardenne
- Score: 6–4, 6–4

Details
- Draw: 128
- Seeds: 32

Events
Singles	men	women		boys	girls
Doubles	men	women	mixed	boys	girls
WC Singles	men	women	quad
WC Doubles	men	women	quad
Legends	men	women	mixed
← 2005 ·	US Open	· 2007 →

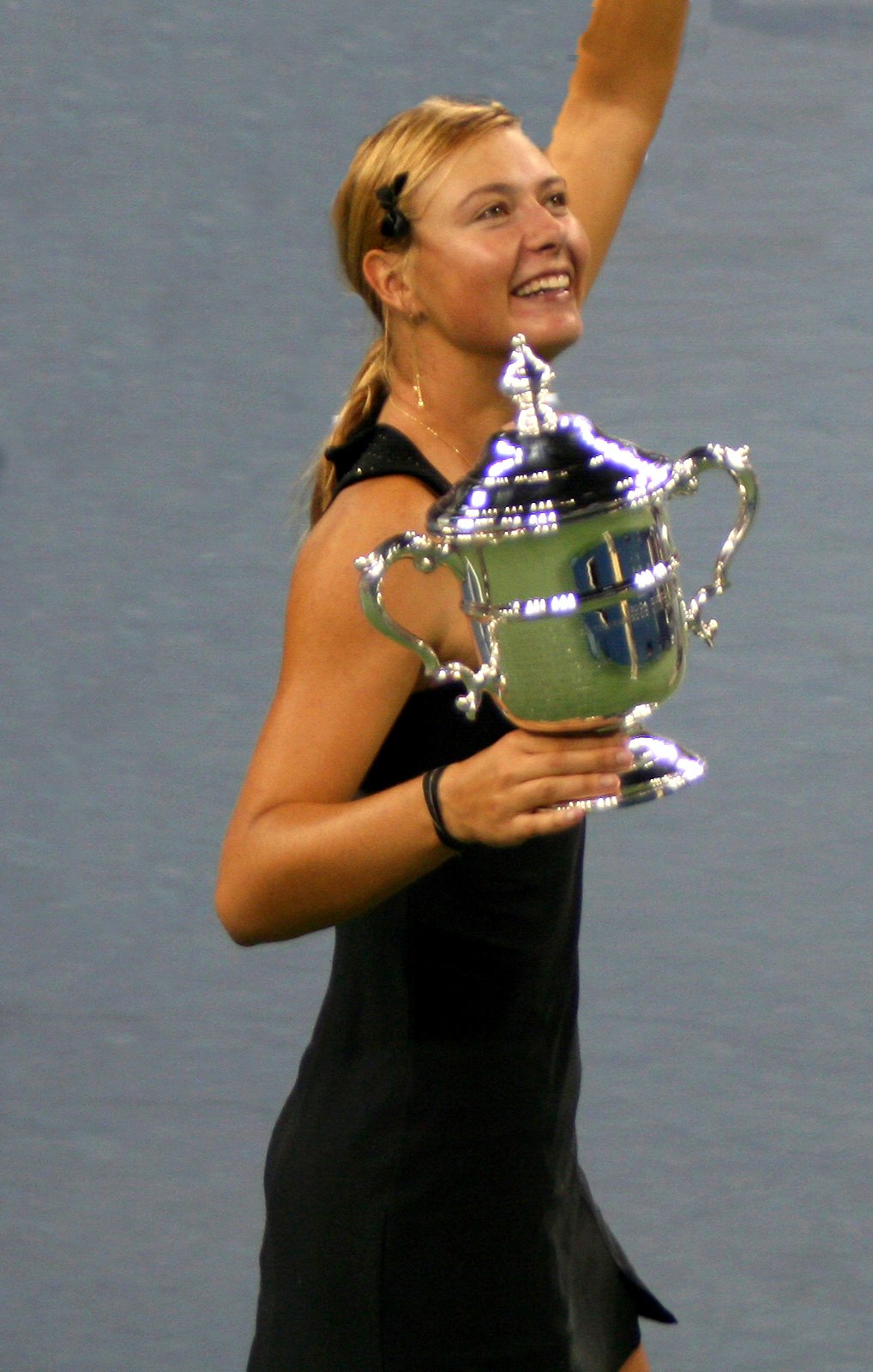
Maria Sharapova holds the US Open Trophy

Maria Sharapova defeated Justine Henin-Hardenne in the final, 6–4, 6–4 to win the women's singles tennis title at the 2006 US Open. It was her second major title. By reaching the final, Henin-Hardenne became the eighth woman (after Maureen Connolly, Margaret Court, Chris Evert, Martina Navratilova, Steffi Graf, Monica Seles and Martina Hingis) to reach all four major finals in a calendar year, and remains the last woman to achieve the feat.

Kim Clijsters was the reigning champion, but did not participate due to injury.

This marked the final major appearance of two-time major champion Mary Pierce, who lost to Li Na in the third round.

This marked the first major since the 1999 Australian Open where Serena Williams was unseeded. Needing a wild card to participate due to her ranking of world No. 139, Williams defeated top-20 players Daniela Hantuchová and Ana Ivanovic en route to the fourth round, where she was beaten by Amélie Mauresmo in three sets.

== Seeds ==
The seeded players are listed below.

1. (France) Amélie Mauresmo (semifinals)
2. (Belgium) Justine Henin-Hardenne (final)
3. (Russia) Maria Sharapova (champion)
4. (Russia) Elena Dementieva (quarterfinals)
5. (Russia) Nadia Petrova (third round)
6. (Russia) Svetlana Kuznetsova (fourth round)
7. (Switzerland) Patty Schnyder (fourth round)
8. (Switzerland) Martina Hingis (second round)
9. (Czech Republic) Nicole Vaidišová (third round)
10. (United States) Lindsay Davenport (quarterfinals)
11. (Russia) Anastasia Myskina (first round)
12. (Russia) Dinara Safina (quarterfinals)
13. (France) Mary Pierce (third round)
14. (Italy) Francesca Schiavone (third round)
15. (Germany) Anna-Lena Grönefeld (first round)
16. (Serbia) Ana Ivanovic (third round)
17. (Slovakia) Daniela Hantuchová (second round)
18. (Italy) Flavia Pennetta (withdrew)
19. (Serbia) Jelena Janković (semifinals)
20. (Russia) Maria Kirilenko (third round)
21. (Israel) Shahar Pe'er (fourth round)
22. (Slovenia) Katarina Srebotnik (third round)
23. (Russia) Anna Chakvetadze (fourth round)
24. (China) Li Na (fourth round)
25. (Spain) Anabel Medina Garrigues (first round)
26. (France) Marion Bartoli (third round)
27. (France) Tatiana Golovin (quarterfinals)
28. (Japan) Ai Sugiyama (third round)
29. (China) Zheng Jie (second round)
30. (United States) Venus Williams (withdrew)
31. (France) Nathalie Dechy (first round)
32. (Russia) Elena Likhovtseva (third round)
33. (Russia) Vera Zvonareva (third round)

== Draw ==
=== Key ===
- Q = Qualifier
- WC = Wild card
- LL = Lucky loser
- Alt = Alternate
- ITF = ITF entry
- PR = Protected ranking
- SR = Special ranking
- SE = Special exempt
- JE = Junior exempt
- JR = Junior Accelerator Programme entrant
- CO = College Accelerator Programme entrant
- NG = Next Gen Accelerator Program entrant
- w/o = Walkover
- r = Retired
- d = Defaulted

=== Finals ===
Quarterfinals
1	(France) Amélie Mauresmo	6	6
12	(Russia) Dinara Safina	2	3
3	(Russia) Maria Sharapova	7^{7}	7^{7}
27	(France) Tatiana Golovin	6^{4}	6^{0}
19	(Serbia) Jelena Janković	6	6
4	(Russia) Elena Dementieva	2	1
10	(United States) Lindsay Davenport	4	4
2	(Belgium) Justine Henin-Hardenne	6	6

Semifinals
1	(France) Amélie Mauresmo	0	6	0
3	(Russia) Maria Sharapova	6	4	6
19	(Serbia) Jelena Janković	6	4	0
2	(Belgium) Justine Henin-Hardenne	4	6	6

Finals
3	(Russia) Maria Sharapova	6	6
2	(Belgium) Justine Henin-Hardenne	4	4

=== Top half ===
==== Section 1 ====
First round
1	(France) A Mauresmo	6	7
Q	(Germany) K Barrois	1	5
(United States) M Shaughnessy	6	6
(Italy) R Vinci	3	4
(Italy) M Santangelo	7^{7}	6
(United States) L Raymond	6^{4}	2
(Austria) S Bammer	5	6	6
31	(France) N Dechy	7	3	1
17	(Slovakia) D Hantuchová	7	6
WC	(United States) B Mattek	5	3
(Spain) L Domínguez Lino	1	2
WC	(United States) S Williams	6	6
(Hungary) M Czink	1	2
(Japan) A Nakamura	6	6
(Russia) V Dushevina	3	7	4
16	(Serbia) A Ivanovic	6	5	6

Second round
1	(France) A Mauresmo	6	6
(United States) M Shaughnessy	4	3
(Italy) M Santangelo	6	6
(Austria) S Bammer	3	1
17	(Slovakia) D Hantuchová	5	3
WC	(United States) S Williams	7	6
(Japan) A Nakamura	5	3
16	(Serbia) A Ivanovic	7	6

Third round
1	(France) A Mauresmo	6	3	6
(Italy) M Santangelo	3	6	2
WC	(United States) S Williams	6	6
16	(Serbia) A Ivanovic	2	4

Fourth round
1	(France) A Mauresmo	6	0	6
WC	(United States) S Williams	4	6	2

==== Section 2 ====
First round
12	(Russia) D Safina	6	6
Q	(Ukraine) Y Beygelzimer	1	3
(Ukraine) Y Fedak	7	6
Q	(Belarus) T Poutchek	5	3
WC	(United States) A Glatch	2	1
(Slovakia) J Gajdošová	6	6
(Ukraine) V Kutuzova	6	6
LL	(Spain) MJ Martínez Sánchez	3	3
25	(Spain) A Medina Garrigues	5	1
Q	(France) Y Fedossova	7	6
(Estonia) K Kanepi	3	7	6
(France) S Foretz	6	5	1
(Estonia) M Ani	5	4
(France) V Razzano	7	6
(China) S Peng	6	1	3
8	(Switzerland) M Hingis	4	6	6

Second round
12	(Russia) D Safina	6	6
(Ukraine) Y Fedak	3	4
(Slovakia) J Gajdošová	6	7^{7}
(Ukraine) V Kutuzova	3	6^{5}
Q	(France) Y Fedossova	4	6	5
(Estonia) K Kanepi	6	4	7
(France) V Razzano	6	6
8	(Switzerland) M Hingis	2	4

Third round
12	(Russia) D Safina	6	6
(Slovakia) J Gajdošová	3	0
(Estonia) K Kanepi	5	2
(France) V Razzano	7	6

Fourth round
12	(Russia) D Safina	6	7
(France) V Razzano	0	5

==== Section 3 ====
First round
3	(Russia) M Sharapova	6	6
(Netherlands) M Krajicek	3	0
(France) É Loit	5	6	7^{7}
(France) C Pin	7	4	6^{4}
LL	(Australia) N Pratt	1	7	6
Q	(Venezuela) M Sequera	6	5	2
(China) T Sun	6	0	4
32	(Russia) E Likhovtseva	4	6	6
24	(China) N Li	4	6	6
(Spain) M Sánchez Lorenzo	6	3	0
(United States) S Perry	0	2
(Greece) E Daniilidou	6	6
Q	(Czech Republic) E Birnerová	7^{7}	5	6
(Russia) G Voskoboeva	6^{4}	7	3
(Russia) E Vesnina	5	1
13	(France) M Pierce	7	6

Second round
3	(Russia) M Sharapova	6	6
(France) É Loit	0	1
LL	(Australia) N Pratt	3	2
32	(Russia) E Likhovtseva	6	6
24	(China) N Li	6	1	6
(Greece) E Daniilidou	0	6	4
Q	(Czech Republic) E Birnerová	3	4
13	(France) M Pierce	6	6

Third round
3	(Russia) M Sharapova	6	6
32	(Russia) E Likhovtseva	3	2
24	(China) N Li	4	6	6
13	(France) M Pierce	6	0	0

Fourth round
3	(Russia) M Sharapova	6	6
24	(China) N Li	4	2

==== Section 4 ====
First round
11	(Russia) A Myskina	4	2
(Belarus) V Azarenka	6	6
(United States) J Jackson	6	6
(Bulgaria) T Pironkova	2	2
WC	(United States) A Rolle	4	4
(Ukraine) A Bondarenko	6	6
(Slovakia) M Suchá	4	1
23	(Russia) A Chakvetadze	6	6
27	(France) T Golovin	6	7
(United States) A Harkleroad	3	5
(China) Z Yan	0	5
Q	(Poland) A Radwańska	6	7
(United States) A Frazier	2	1
(Spain) V Ruano Pascual	6	6
Q	(Argentina) C Fernández	2	1
5	(Russia) N Petrova	6	6

Second round
(Belarus) V Azarenka	6	6
(United States) J Jackson	3	2
(Ukraine) A Bondarenko	6^{6}	0
23	(Russia) A Chakvetadze	7^{8}	6
27	(France) T Golovin	6	6
Q	(Poland) A Radwańska	4	3
(Spain) V Ruano Pascual	1	1
5	(Russia) N Petrova	6	6

Third round
(Belarus) V Azarenka	4	3
23	(Russia) A Chakvetadze	6	6
27	(France) T Golovin	7	6^{4}	6
5	(Russia) N Petrova	5	7^{7}	3

Fourth round
23	(Russia) A Chakvetadze	3	2
27	(France) T Golovin	6	6

=== Bottom half ===
==== Section 5 ====
First round
6	(Russia) S Kuznetsova	6	2	6
Q	(Germany) S Klösel	2	6	3
WC	(United States) L Albanese	6^{5}	6	6
(Ukraine) O Savchuk	7^{7}	4	2
(Czech Republic) H Šromová	5	5
(Russia) A Rodionova	7	7
(Czech Republic) K Peschke	4	7	5
29	(China) J Zheng	6	5	7
19	(Serbia) J Janković	6^{2}	6	6
(Argentina) G Dulko	7^{7}	1	4
Q	(Chinese Taipei) Y-J Chan	4	2
Q	(Belgium) K Flipkens	6	6
PR	(Russia) A Jidkova	3	6	6
WC	(United States) J Kirkland	6	2	4
WC	(United States) C Rubin	4	3
9	(Czech Republic) N Vaidišová	6	6

Second round
6	(Russia) S Kuznetsova	6	6
WC	(United States) L Albanese	1	1
(Russia) A Rodionova	7	6
29	(China) J Zheng	5	3
19	(Serbia) J Janković	6	6
Q	(Belgium) K Flipkens	2	3
PR	(Russia) A Jidkova	2	6	3
9	(Czech Republic) N Vaidišová	6	3	6

Third round
6	(Russia) S Kuznetsova	6	6
(Russia) A Rodionova	3	0
19	(Serbia) J Janković	5	6	6
9	(Czech Republic) N Vaidišová	7	3	2

Fourth round
6	(Russia) S Kuznetsova	7^{7}	3	2
19	(Serbia) J Janković	6^{5}	6	6

==== Section 6 ====
First round
15	(Germany) A-L Grönefeld	6	0	4
(France) A Rezaï	2	6	6
(Australia) S Stosur	2	6^{5}
(Czech Republic) L Šafářová	6	7^{7}
Q	(Canada) S Dubois	1	3
(France) S Brémond	6	6
(Germany) J Schruff	3	4
20	(Russia) M Kirilenko	6	6
33	(Russia) V Zvonareva	7^{7}	6
(Poland) M Domachowska	6^{4}	3
(Czech Republic) I Benešová	2	0
(United States) J Craybas	6	6
(United States) M Tu	1	1
(Finland) E Laine	6	6
(United States) L Granville	1	4
4	(Russia) E Dementieva	6	6

Second round
(France) A Rezaï	7^{7}	2	6
(Czech Republic) L Šafářová	6^{3}	6	4
(France) S Brémond	2	3
20	(Russia) M Kirilenko	6	6
33	(Russia) V Zvonareva	6	7
(United States) J Craybas	3	5
(Finland) E Laine	4	0
4	(Russia) E Dementieva	6	6

Third round
(France) A Rezaï	6	6
20	(Russia) M Kirilenko	3	1
33	(Russia) V Zvonareva	5	3
4	(Russia) E Dementieva	7	6

Fourth round
(France) A Rezaï	5	4
4	(Russia) E Dementieva	7	6

==== Section 7 ====
First round
7	(Switzerland) P Schnyder	6	6
(Israel) A Smashnova	1	2
(Sweden) S Arvidsson	6	6
(Spain) C Martínez Granados	2	4
(Colombia) C Castaño	7^{11}	1	1
Q	(Uzbekistan) V Lepchenko	6^{9}	6	6
Q	(Russia) O Puchkova	4	0
26	(France) M Bartoli	6	6
22	(Slovenia) K Srebotnik	6	6
(Japan) A Morigami	2	3
(Russia) E Bychkova	7^{7}	7^{7}
Q	(Russia) L Skavronskaia	6^{1}	6^{3}
(Japan) S Asagoe	4	6^{4}
(Croatia) J Kostanić	6	7^{7}
(Czech Republic) K Zakopalová	1	4
10	(United States) L Davenport	6	6

Second round
7	(Switzerland) P Schnyder	6	7
(Sweden) S Arvidsson	3	5
Q	(Uzbekistan) V Lepchenko	1	2
26	(France) M Bartoli	6	6
22	(Slovenia) K Srebotnik	6	4	6
(Russia) E Bychkova	2	6	2
(Croatia) J Kostanić	0	0
10	(United States) L Davenport	6	6

Third round
7	(Switzerland) P Schnyder	0	6	6
26	(France) M Bartoli	6	3	3
22	(Slovenia) K Srebotnik	6	3	6^{5}
10	(United States) L Davenport	3	6	7^{7}

Fourth round
7	(Switzerland) P Schnyder	4	4
10	(United States) L Davenport	6	6

==== Section 8 ====
First round
14	(Italy) F Schiavone	6	6
(Italy) R Oprandi	1	2
(Croatia) K Šprem	4	2
(India) S Mirza	6	6
(Germany) M Müller	7^{7}	6
(Belarus) A Yakimova	6^{2}	3
Q	(Russia) V Bardina	2	2
21	(Israel) S Pe'er	6	6
28	(Japan) A Sugiyama	6	6
(Czech Republic) Z Ondrášková	1	0
(Italy) T Garbin	6	6
(China) M Yuan	3	1
(United States) V King	6	6
WC	(Australia) A Molik	3	2
(Italy) ME Camerin	2	1
2	(Belgium) J Henin-Hardenne	6	6

Second round
14	(Italy) F Schiavone	5	6	6
(India) S Mirza	7	1	2
(Germany) M Müller	1	7	2
21	(Israel) S Pe'er	6	5	6
28	(Japan) A Sugiyama	6^{2}	6	6
(Italy) T Garbin	7^{7}	4	2
(United States) V King	1	2
2	(Belgium) J Henin-Hardenne	6	6

Third round
14	(Italy) F Schiavone	3	7^{7}	6^{3}
21	(Israel) S Pe'er	6	6^{3}	7^{7}
28	(Japan) A Sugiyama	6	1	0
2	(Belgium) J Henin-Hardenne	4	6	6

Fourth round
21	(Israel) S Pe'er	1	0
2	(Belgium) J Henin-Hardenne	6	6

== Championship match statistics ==
Category	(Russia) Sharapova	(Belgium) Henin-Hardenne
1st serve %	46/64 (72%)	32/60 (53%)
1st serve points won	34 of 46 = 74%	21 of 32 = 66%
2nd serve points won	9 of 18 = 50%	16 of 28 = 57%
Total service points won	43 of 64 = 67.19%	37 of 60 = 61.67%
Aces	5	2
Double faults	4	2
Winners	18	12
Unforced errors	27	27
Net points won	8 of 11 = 73%	8 of 9 = 89%
Break points converted	3 of 7 = 43%	1 of 1 = 100%
Return points won	23 of 60 = 38%	21 of 64 = 33%
Total points won	66	58

== Notes and references ==
Preceded by 2006 Wimbledon Championships – Women's singles	Grand Slam women's singles	Succeeded by 2007 Australian Open – Women's singles
