= 2011 French Open – Women's singles =

Women's singles
- 2011 French Open

Final
- Champion: (China) Li Na
- Runner-up: (Italy) Francesca Schiavone
- Score: 6–4, 7–6^{(7–0)}

Events
Singles	men	women		boys	girls
Doubles	men	women	mixed	boys	girls
WC Singles	men	women	quad
WC Doubles	men	women	quad
Legends	−45	45+	women
- French Open

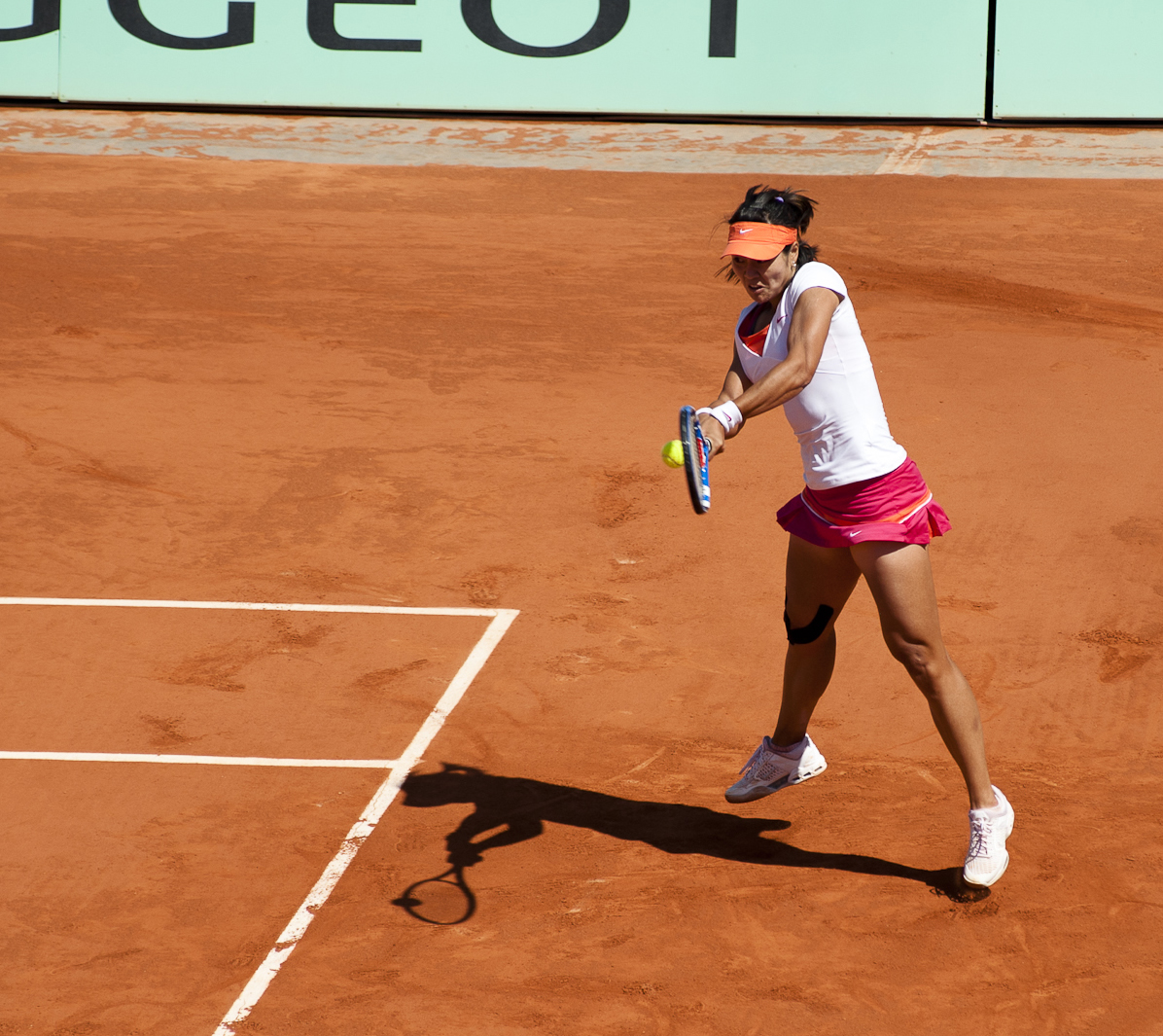
Li Na in the semifinals against Maria Sharapova

Li Na defeated defending champion Francesca Schiavone in the final, 6–4, 7–6^{(7–0)} to win the women's singles tennis title at the 2011 French Open. It was her first major title, and she was the first woman from China, and from any Asian country, to win a major singles title. Li was the first player to defeat four top-10 opponents en route to the French Open title. The final was also a rematch of the pair's third-round match from the previous year.

Caroline Wozniacki and Kim Clijsters were in contention for the world No. 1 ranking; Wozniacki retained the top ranking after Clijsters lost in the second round, despite herself losing in the third round. This was the first time in the Open Era that neither of the top two seeds of a major progressed past the third round.

This was the first French Open since 1996 where neither Venus Williams nor Serena Williams participated. It was also the only major between the 2003 US Open and the 2021 US Open where neither of the Williams sisters participated.

This marked the major debut of future world No. 3, US Open champion, and French Open finalist Sloane Stephens; she was defeated by Elena Baltacha in the first round.

== Seeds ==
1. (Denmark) Caroline Wozniacki (third round)
2. (Belgium) Kim Clijsters (second round)
3. (Russia) Vera Zvonareva (fourth round)
4. (Belarus) Victoria Azarenka (quarterfinals)
5. (Italy) Francesca Schiavone (final)
6. (China) Li Na (champion)
7. (Russia) Maria Sharapova (semifinals)
8. (Australia) Samantha Stosur (third round)
9. (Czech Republic) Petra Kvitová (fourth round)
10. (Serbia) Jelena Janković (fourth round)
11. (France) Marion Bartoli (semifinals)
12. (Poland) Agnieszka Radwańska (fourth round)
13. (Russia) Svetlana Kuznetsova (quarterfinals)
14. (Russia) Anastasia Pavlyuchenkova (quarterfinals)
15. (Germany) Andrea Petkovic (quarterfinals)
16. (Estonia) Kaia Kanepi (third round)

17. (Germany) Julia Görges (third round)
18. (Italy) Flavia Pennetta (first round)
19. (Israel) Shahar Pe'er (first round)
20. (Serbia) Ana Ivanovic (first round)
21. (Belgium) Yanina Wickmayer (third round)
22. (Slovakia) Dominika Cibulková (first round)
23. (Russia) Alisa Kleybanova (withdrew due to illness)
24. (Australia) Jarmila Gajdošová (third round)
25. (Russia) Maria Kirilenko (fourth round)
26. (Russia) Nadia Petrova (first round)
27. (Romania) Alexandra Dulgheru (second round)
28. (Slovakia) Daniela Hantuchová (fourth round)
29. (China) Peng Shuai (third round, retired due to illness)
30. (Italy) Roberta Vinci (third round)
31. (Czech Republic) Klára Zakopalová (first round)
32. (Bulgaria) Tsvetana Pironkova (second round)

Click on the seed number of a player to go to their draw section.

== Draw ==
Key

- Q = Qualifier
- WC = Wild card
- LL = Lucky loser
- Alt = Alternate
- ITF = ITF entry
- PR = Protected ranking
- SR = Special ranking
- SE = Special exempt
- JE = Junior exempt
- JR = Junior Accelerator Programme entrant
- CO = College Accelerator Programme entrant
- NG = Next Gen Accelerator Program entrant
- w/o = Walkover
- r = Retired
- d = Defaulted

=== Finals ===
Quarterfinals
13	(Russia) Svetlana Kuznetsova	6^{4}	4
11	(France) Marion Bartoli	7^{7}	6
14	(Russia) Anastasia Pavlyuchenkova	6	5	5
5	(Italy) Francesca Schiavone	1	7	7
6	(China) Li Na	7	6
4	(Belarus) Victoria Azarenka	5	2
7	(Russia) Maria Sharapova	6	6
15	(Germany) Andrea Petkovic	0	3

Semifinals
11	(France) Marion Bartoli	3	3
5	(Italy) Francesca Schiavone	6	6
6	(China) Li Na	6	7
7	(Russia) Maria Sharapova	4	5

Final
5	(Italy) Francesca Schiavone	4	6^{0}
6	(China) Li Na	6	7^{7}

=== Top half ===
==== Section 1 ====
First round
1	(Denmark) C Wozniacki	6	6
(Japan) K Date-Krumm	0	2
(Japan) J Namigata	1	1
Q	(Canada) A Wozniak	6	6
(United States) C McHale	7^{7}	2	7
(Italy) S Errani	6^{4}	6	9
(China) S Zhang	3	3
28	(Slovakia) D Hantuchová	6	6
19	(Israel) S Pe'er	6^{4}	1
(Spain) MJ Martínez Sánchez	7^{7}	6
(Canada) R Marino	6	6
(Ukraine) K Bondarenko	3	3
(France) A Rezaï	3	3
(Romania) I-C Begu	6	6
(Slovakia) M Rybáriková	2	3
13	(Russia) S Kuznetsova	6	6

Second round
1	(Denmark) C Wozniacki	6	7^{8}
Q	(Canada) A Wozniak	3	6^{6}
(Italy) S Errani	1	2
28	(Slovakia) D Hantuchová	6	6
(Spain) MJ Martínez Sánchez	6	3	3
(Canada) R Marino	2	6	6
(Romania) I-C Begu	1	1
13	(Russia) S Kuznetsova	6	6

Third round
1	(Denmark) C Wozniacki	1	3
28	(Slovakia) D Hantuchová	6	6
(Canada) R Marino	0	4
13	(Russia) S Kuznetsova	6	6

Fourth round
28	(Slovakia) D Hantuchová	7^{8}	3	2
13	(Russia) S Kuznetsova	6^{6}	6	6

==== Section 2 ====
First round
11	(France) M Bartoli	1	6	6
(Georgia (country)) A Tatishvili	6	2	1
(Hungary) A Szávay	4	6	4
Q	(Belarus) O Govortsova	6	4	6
(Belgium) K Flipkens	1	1
(Czech Republic) L Šafářová	6	6
(France) M Johansson	1	4
17	(Germany) J Görges	6	6
32	(Bulgaria) T Pironkova	7	6
WC	(Australia) C Dellacqua	5	3
(Argentina) G Dulko	6	6
WC	(United States) I Falconi	3	4
(Russia) A Kudryavtseva	2	1
(Romania) S Halep	6	6
(Czech Republic) I Benešová	2	3
8	(Australia) S Stosur	6	6

Second round
11	(France) M Bartoli	6	6^{1}	6
Q	(Belarus) O Govortsova	4	7^{7}	2
(Czech Republic) L Šafářová	6	5	2
17	(Germany) J Görges	2	7	6
32	(Bulgaria) T Pironkova	4	2
(Argentina) G Dulko	6	6
(Romania) S Halep	0	2
8	(Australia) S Stosur	6	6

Third round
11	(France) M Bartoli	3	6	6
17	(Germany) J Görges	6	2	4
(Argentina) G Dulko	6	1	6
8	(Australia) S Stosur	4	6	3

Fourth round
11	(France) M Bartoli	7	1
(Argentina) G Dulko	5	0^{r}

==== Section 3 ====
First round
3	(Russia) V Zvonareva	6	6
(Spain) L Domínguez Lino	3	3
Q	(Germany) S Lisicki	6	6
(Uzbekistan) A Amanmuradova	0	4
(Germany) A Kerber	6	3	1
(Romania) E Gallovits-Hall	2	6	6
(Australia) A Rodionova	6^{5}	6	6
26	(Russia) N Petrova	7^{7}	3	4
LL	(Russia) A Pivovarova	3	0
Q	(Spain) N Llagostera Vives	6	6
(Czech Republic) R Voráčová	4	2
(France) A Cornet	6	6
(Austria) S Bammer	1	5
Q	(Germany) M Barthel	6	7
(Kazakhstan) Y Shvedova	5	3
14	(Russia) A Pavlyuchenkova	7	6

Second round
3	(Russia) V Zvonareva	4	7	7
Q	(Germany) S Lisicki	6	5	5
(Romania) E Gallovits-Hall	1	4
(Australia) A Rodionova	6	6
Q	(Spain) N Llagostera Vives	6	6
(France) A Cornet	0	2
Q	(Germany) M Barthel	0	6^{5}
14	(Russia) A Pavlyuchenkova	6	7^{7}

Third round
3	(Russia) V Zvonareva	6	6
(Australia) A Rodionova	2	3
Q	(Spain) N Llagostera Vives	6	3	3
14	(Russia) A Pavlyuchenkova	3	6	6

Fourth round
3	(Russia) V Zvonareva	6^{4}	6	2
14	(Russia) A Pavlyuchenkova	7^{7}	2	6

==== Section 4 ====
First round
10	(Serbia) J Janković	6	6
(Ukraine) A Bondarenko	3	1
(Australia) J Dokić	6	3	2
(Russia) V Dushevina	4	6	6
(Spain) A Parra Santonja	6	6^{5}	3
(United States) B Mattek-Sands	2	7^{7}	6
(United States) V Lepchenko	6	2	6
18	(Italy) F Pennetta	3	6	3
29	(China) S Peng	6	6
(Austria) T Paszek	3	2
WC	(France) O Sanchez	0	1
(Slovenia) P Hercog	6	6
(United Kingdom) A Keothavong	6	6^{5}	4
(Russia) V Dolonc	3	7^{7}	6
(United States) M Oudin	2	0
5	(Italy) F Schiavone	6	6

Second round
10	(Serbia) J Janković	6	6
(Russia) V Dushevina	3	2
(United States) B Mattek-Sands	6	2	6
(United States) V Lepchenko	3	6	3
29	(China) S Peng	7	6
(Slovenia) P Hercog	5	1
(Russia) V Dolonc	1	2
5	(Italy) F Schiavone	6	6

Third round
10	(Serbia) J Janković	6	6
(United States) B Mattek-Sands	2	2
29	(China) S Peng	3	2^{r}
5	(Italy) F Schiavone	6	1

Fourth round
10	(Serbia) J Janković	3	6	4
5	(Italy) F Schiavone	6	2	6

=== Bottom half ===
==== Section 5 ====
First round
6	(China) N Li	6	6^{6}	6
(Czech Republic) B Záhlavová-Strýcová	3	7^{8}	3
Q	(Spain) S Soler Espinosa	4	6	6
(Russia) E Vesnina	6	3	4
(Switzerland) P Schnyder	1	3
(Romania) S Cîrstea	6	6
(Spain) L Pous Tió	3	4
27	(Romania) A Dulgheru	6	6
22	(Slovakia) D Cibulková	7^{12}	3	2
(United States) V King	6^{10}	6	6
(United Kingdom) E Baltacha	7	6
Q	(United States) S Stephens	5	2
(Czech Republic) S Záhlavová	4	3
(China) J Zheng	6	6
(Hungary) G Arn	2	1
9	(Czech Republic) P Kvitová	6	6

Second round
6	(China) N Li	6	7
Q	(Spain) S Soler Espinosa	4	5
(Romania) S Cîrstea	6	7
27	(Romania) A Dulgheru	2	5
(United States) V King	4	6	6
(United Kingdom) E Baltacha	6	1	4
(China) J Zheng	4	1
9	(Czech Republic) P Kvitová	6	6

Third round
6	(China) N Li	6	6
(Romania) S Cîrstea	2	2
(United States) V King	4	2
9	(Czech Republic) P Kvitová	6	6

Fourth round
6	(China) N Li	2	6	6
9	(Czech Republic) P Kvitová	6	1	3

==== Section 6 ====
First round
16	(Estonia) K Kanepi	7	6
(Sweden) S Arvidsson	5	1
WC	(France) S Foretz Gacon	6^{6}	1
Q	(United Kingdom) H Watson	7^{8}	6
(Russia) E Makarova	6	3	6
(Italy) R Oprandi	4	6	0
(Sweden) J Larsson	7^{7}	0	6
20	(Serbia) A Ivanovic	6^{3}	6	2
30	(Italy) R Vinci	6	3	6
(Italy) A Brianti	3	6	3
(Russia) E Rodina	3	6	6
WC	(France) I Brémond	6	4	8
WC	(France) P Parmentier	7^{7}	6
(Russia) K Pervak	6^{5}	4
(Czech Republic) A Hlaváčková	3	3
4	(Belarus) V Azarenka	6	6

Second round
16	(Estonia) K Kanepi	6	6
Q	(United Kingdom) H Watson	1	3
(Russia) E Makarova	6	7^{7}
(Sweden) J Larsson	3	6^{5}
30	(Italy) R Vinci	6	6
WC	(France) I Brémond	3	4
WC	(France) P Parmentier	0	1
4	(Belarus) V Azarenka	6	6

Third round
16	(Estonia) K Kanepi	4	5
(Russia) E Makarova	6	7
30	(Italy) R Vinci	3	2
4	(Belarus) V Azarenka	6	6

Fourth round
(Russia) E Makarova	2	3
4	(Belarus) V Azarenka	6	6

==== Section 7 ====
First round
7	(Russia) M Sharapova	6	6
(Croatia) M Lučić	3	0
(Czech Republic) Z Ondrášková	3	4
WC	(France) C Garcia	6	6
(United States) J Craybas	6	6
Q	(Greece) E Daniilidou	3	3
Q	(Chinese Taipei) Y-j Chan	7	6
31	(Czech Republic) K Zakopalová	5	1
21	(Belgium) Y Wickmayer	6	6
(Romania) M Niculescu	0	3
WC	(France) K Mladenovic	6	4	5
(Japan) A Morita	2	6	7
(India) S Mirza	6	6
(Germany) K Barrois	3	3
(Austria) P Mayr-Achleitner	1	2
12	(Poland) A Radwańska	6	6

Second round
7	(Russia) M Sharapova	3	6	6
WC	(France) C Garcia	6	4	0
(United States) J Craybas	1	4
Q	(Chinese Taipei) Y-j Chan	6	6
21	(Belgium) Y Wickmayer	6	7
(Japan) A Morita	4	5
(India) S Mirza	2	4
12	(Poland) A Radwańska	6	6

Third round
7	(Russia) M Sharapova	6	6
Q	(Chinese Taipei) Y-j Chan	2	3
21	(Belgium) Y Wickmayer	4	4
12	(Poland) A Radwańska	6	6

Fourth round
7	(Russia) M Sharapova	7^{7}	7
12	(Poland) A Radwańska	6^{4}	5

==== Section 8 ====
First round
15	(Germany) A Petkovic	6	7^{7}
(Serbia) B Jovanovski	4	6^{3}
(Latvia) A Sevastova	3	7	1
(Czech Republic) L Hradecká	6	5	6
Q	(Italy) C Dentoni	5	5
(Spain) A Medina Garrigues	7	7
(France) V Razzano	3	1
24	(Australia) J Gajdošová	6	6
25	(Russia) M Kirilenko	7^{8}	6
(United States) C Vandeweghe	6^{6}	2
PR	(Ukraine) V Kutuzova	3	6	2
(South Africa) C Scheepers	6	4	6
Q	(New Zealand) M Erakovic	6	4	4
(Netherlands) A Rus	2	6	6
(Belarus) A Yakimova	2	3
2	(Belgium) K Clijsters	6	6

Second round
15	(Germany) A Petkovic	7^{7}	6
(Czech Republic) L Hradecká	6^{2}	2
(Spain) A Medina Garrigues	6^{4}	4
24	(Australia) J Gajdošová	7^{7}	6
25	(Russia) M Kirilenko	6	6
(South Africa) C Scheepers	1	4
(Netherlands) A Rus	3	7	6
2	(Belgium) K Clijsters	6	5	1

Third round
15	(Germany) A Petkovic	6	4	6
24	(Australia) J Gajdošová	2	6	3
25	(Russia) M Kirilenko	6	6
(Netherlands) A Rus	1	1

Fourth round
15	(Germany) A Petkovic	6	2	6
25	(Russia) M Kirilenko	2	6	4

== Championship match statistics ==
Category	(China) Li	(Italy) Schiavone
1st serve %	53/69 (77%)	45/70 (64%)
1st serve points won	37 of 53 = 70%	32 of 45 = 71%
2nd serve points won	11 of 16 = 69%	11 of 25 = 44%
Total service points won	48 of 69 = 69.57%	43 of 70 = 61.43%
Aces	3	0
Double faults	1	0
Winners	31	12
Unforced errors	24	17
Net points won	10 of 11 = 91%	6 of 13 = 46%
Break points converted	2 of 8 = 25%	1 of 2 = 50%
Return points won	27 of 70 = 39%	21 of 69 = 30%
Total points won	75	64

Preceded by 2011 Australian Open – Women's singles	Grand Slam women's singles	Succeeded by 2011 Wimbledon Championships – Women's singles
