= 2007 Pacific Life Open – Women's singles =

Women's singles
- 2007 Pacific Life Open

Final
- Champion: (Slovakia) Daniela Hantuchová
- Runner-up: (Russia) Svetlana Kuznetsova
- Score: 6–3, 6–4

Events
Singles	men	women
Doubles	men	women
← 2006 ·	Pacific Life Open	· 2008 →

Daniela Hantuchová defeated Svetlana Kuznetsova in the final, 6–3, 6–4 to win the women's singles tennis title at the 2007 Indian Wells Masters. It was her second Indian Wells Masters title.

Maria Sharapova was the defending champion, but lost in the fourth round to Vera Zvonareva.

== Seeds ==
All seeds received a bye into the second round.

1. (Russia) Maria Sharapova (fourth round)
2. (Russia) Svetlana Kuznetsova (final)
3. (Switzerland) Martina Hingis (fourth round)
4. (Russia) Nadia Petrova (fourth round)
5. (Russia) Elena Dementieva (withdrew due to rib stress injury)
6. (Czech Republic) Nicole Vaidišová (quarterfinals)
7. (Serbia) Jelena Janković (fourth round)
8. (Russia) Anna Chakvetadze (fourth round)
9. (Russia) Dinara Safina (third round)
10. (Serbia) Ana Ivanovic (fourth round)
11. (Israel) Shahar Pe'er (quarterfinals)
12. (China) Li Na (semifinals)
13. (France) Tatiana Golovin (quarterfinals)
14. (Slovakia) Daniela Hantuchová (champion)
15. (Russia) Vera Zvonareva (quarterfinals)
16. (Japan) Ai Sugiyama (fourth round)
17. (France) Marion Bartoli (fourth round)
18. (Italy) Francesca Schiavone (third round)
19. (Czech Republic) Lucie Šafářová (third round)
20. (Italy) Tathiana Garbin (third round)
21. (Australia) Samantha Stosur (third round)
22. (China) Zheng Jie (second round)
23. (Ukraine) Alona Bondarenko (third round)
24. (Spain) Anabel Medina Garrigues (second round)
25. (Russia) Maria Kirilenko (third round)
26. (Russia) Olga Puchkova (second round)
27. (France) Séverine Brémond (second round)
28. (Germany) Martina Müller (third round)
29. (United States) Meghann Shaughnessy (second round)
30. (China) Peng Shuai (third round)
31. (Italy) Flavia Pennetta (second round)
32. (Italy) Roberta Vinci (second round)
33. (Austria) Sybille Bammer (semifinals)

== Draw ==
=== Key ===
- Q = Qualifier
- WC = Wild card
- LL = Lucky loser
- Alt = Alternate
- SE = Special exempt
- PR = Protected ranking
- ITF = ITF entry
- JE = Junior exempt
- w/o = Walkover
- r = Retired
- d = Defaulted
- SR = Special ranking

=== Finals ===
Quarterfinals
15	(Russia) Vera Zvonareva	4	5
12	(China) Li Na	6	7
14	(Slovakia) Daniela Hantuchová	6	5	7^{7}
11	(Israel) Shahar Pe'er	2	7	6^{5}
33	(Austria) Sybille Bammer	6	6
13	(France) Tatiana Golovin	2	3
6	(Czech Republic) Nicole Vaidišová	6	3	4
2	(Russia) Svetlana Kuznetsova	4	6	6

Semifinals
12	(China) Li Na	5	6	1
14	(Slovakia) Daniela Hantuchová	7	4	6
33	(Austria) Sybille Bammer	7^{7}	4	1
2	(Russia) Svetlana Kuznetsova	6^{5}	6	6

Final
14	(Slovakia) Daniela Hantuchová	6	6
2	(Russia) Svetlana Kuznetsova	3	4

=== Top half ===
==== Section 1 ====
First round
(Sweden) S Arvidsson	4	3
(Netherlands) M Krajicek	6	6
(Chinese Taipei) Y-j Chan	6^{2}	1
(France) N Dechy	7^{7}	6
Q	(Belarus) V Azarenka	7	6
(France) É Loit	5	3
(United States) J Craybas	6	7
(Italy) ME Camerin	1	5

Second round
1	(Russia) M Sharapova	7^{7}	6
(Netherlands) M Krajicek	6^{5}	4
(France) N Dechy	6^{3}	6	6
31	(Italy) F Pennetta	7^{7}	4	2
22	(China) J Zheng	3	5
Q	(Belarus) V Azarenka	6	7
(United States) J Craybas	5	1
15	(Russia) V Zvonareva	7	6

Third round
1	(Russia) M Sharapova	7	6
(France) N Dechy	5	2
Q	(Belarus) V Azarenka	3	3
15	(Russia) V Zvonareva	6	6

Fourth round
1	(Russia) M Sharapova	6	5	1
15	(Russia) V Zvonareva	4	7	6

==== Section 2 ====
First round
(Spain) V Ruano Pascual	6^{4}	6	3
(Australia) N Pratt	7^{7}	2	6
Q	(Italy) A Brianti	6	6
Q	(Ukraine) O Savchuk	2	4
Q	(Belarus) T Poutchek	3	2
(United States) M Tu	6	6
(United States) S Perry	6	6
(Russia) G Voskoboeva	3	2

Second round
12	(China) N Li	6	1	6
(Australia) N Pratt	4	6	2
Q	(Italy) A Brianti	5	5
23	(Ukraine) A Bondarenko	7	7
28	(Germany) M Müller	2	6	6
(United States) M Tu	6	3	3
(United States) S Perry	1	3
7	(Serbia) J Janković	6	6

Third round
12	(China) N Li	5	6	6
23	(Ukraine) A Bondarenko	7	3	2
28	(Germany) M Müller	2	4
7	(Serbia) J Janković	6	6

Fourth round
12	(China) N Li	6	7^{7}
7	(Serbia) J Janković	3	6^{1}

==== Section 3 ====
First round
WC	(Denmark) C Wozniacki	6	6
(Slovakia) J Gajdošová	3	1
WC	(Georgia (country)) A Tatishvili	6	3	3
Q	(Austria) Y Meusburger	1	6	6
(Ukraine) Y Fedak	6	3	3
(Slovakia) M Suchá	2	6	6
WC	(Puerto Rico) K Brandi	6	5	0
(Estonia) K Kanepi	3	7	6

Second round
3	(Switzerland) M Hingis	6	6
WC	(Denmark) C Wozniacki	1	3
Q	(Austria) Y Meusburger	2	6	6
32	(Italy) R Vinci	6	2	4
18	(Italy) F Schiavone	6	6
(Slovakia) M Suchá	4	4
(Estonia) K Kanepi	2	6	1
14	(Slovakia) D Hantuchová	6	2	6

Third round
3	(Switzerland) M Hingis	6	6
Q	(Austria) Y Meusburger	2	4
18	(Italy) F Schiavone	2	6^{3}
14	(Slovakia) D Hantuchová	6	7^{7}

Fourth round
3	(Switzerland) M Hingis	4	3
14	(Slovakia) D Hantuchová	6	6

==== Section 4 ====
First round
(China) T Sun	6	7^{7}
(Croatia) K Šprem	4	6^{1}
(Russia) A Jidkova	6	2	4
(Poland) A Radwańska	4	6	6
(Czech Republic) E Birnerová	0	4
(Spain) L Domínguez Lino	6	6
WC	(Croatia) M Lučić	6	7^{7}
Q	(United States) L Nelson	4	6^{5}

Second round
11	(Israel) S Pe'er	6	6
(China) T Sun	3	0
(Poland) A Radwańska	3	7^{7}	6^{4}
19	(Czech Republic) L Šafářová	6	6^{2}	7^{7}
25	(Russia) M Kirilenko	3	6	6
(Spain) L Domínguez Lino	6	0	4
WC	(Croatia) M Lučić	2	5
8	(Russia) A Chakvetadze	6	7

Third round
11	(Israel) S Pe'er	6	1	6
19	(Czech Republic) L Šafářová	3	6	4
25	(Russia) M Kirilenko	4	1
8	(Russia) A Chakvetadze	6	6

Fourth round
11	(Israel) S Pe'er	6	7^{7}
8	(Russia) A Chakvetadze	4	6^{2}

=== Bottom half ===
==== Section 5 ====
First round
(Finland) E Laine	1	4
(Russia) A Rodionova	6	6
(United States) A Harkleroad	0	0	r
(Russia) V Bardina	6	3
(France) A Rezaï	2	4
(Australia) A Molik	6	6
Q	(Ukraine) K Bondarenko	4	6	5
(United States) V King	6	3	7

Second round
33	(Austria) S Bammer	6	6
(Russia) A Rodionova	1	0
(Russia) V Bardina	2	0
30	(China) S Peng	6	6
24	(Spain) A Medina Garrigues	3	7	4
(Australia) A Molik	6	5	6
(United States) V King	3	0
10	(Serbia) A Ivanovic	6	6

Third round
33	(Austria) S Bammer	6	6
30	(China) S Peng	3	3
(Australia) A Molik	2	1
10	(Serbia) A Ivanovic	6	6

Fourth round
33	(Austria) S Bammer	6^{6}	6	6
10	(Serbia) A Ivanovic	7^{8}	0	3

==== Section 6 ====
First round
Q	(Germany) S Klösel	6	3	4
(Japan) A Nakamura	2	6	6
(Thailand) T Tanasugarn	7	7^{7}
Q	(Ukraine) J Vakulenko	5	6^{2}
(United States) L Granville	6^{4}	6	6
(France) C Pin	7^{7}	2	1
(Canada) A Wozniak	4	3
(Argentina) G Dulko	6	6

Second round
13	(France) T Golovin	6	7
(Japan) A Nakamura	0	5
(Thailand) T Tanasugarn	3	4
21	(Australia) S Stosur	6	6
27	(France) S Brémond	3	6^{3}
(United States) L Granville	6	7^{7}
(Argentina) G Dulko	3	4
4	(Russia) N Petrova	6	6

Third round
13	(France) T Golovin	6	6
21	(Australia) S Stosur	2	0
(United States) L Granville	6	3	0
4	(Russia) N Petrova	4	6	6

Fourth round
13	(France) T Golovin	6	1
4	(Russia) N Petrova	2	0	r

==== Section 7 ====
First round
WC	(United States) B Mattek	6	6
WC	(Netherlands) B Schultz-McCarthy	1	1
(Belarus) A Yakimova	4	6	0
WC	(United States) A Rolle	6	2	6
(Bulgaria) T Pironkova	7^{7}	7^{7}
Q	(France) S Foretz	6^{1}	6^{4}
(Poland) M Domachowska	6	6
(Colombia) C Castaño	2	1

Second round
6	(Czech Republic) N Vaidišová	6	6
WC	(United States) B Mattek	4	1
WC	(United States) A Rolle	1	6	6
29	(United States) M Shaughnessy	6	1	4
17	(France) M Bartoli	6	6
(Bulgaria) T Pironkova	1	2
(Poland) M Domachowska	3	7	3
9	(Russia) D Safina	6	5	6

Third round
6	(Czech Republic) N Vaidišová	6	4
WC	(United States) A Rolle	3	1	r
17	(France) M Bartoli	6	6
9	(Russia) D Safina	4	3

Fourth round
6	(Czech Republic) N Vaidišová	4	6	6
17	(France) M Bartoli	6	3	2

==== Section 8 ====
First round
(France) V Razzano	7	1	1
Q	(China) M Yuan	5	6	6
(Czech Republic) I Benešová	6	3	7^{7}
(Russia) E Bychkova	4	6	6^{5}
(Russia) E Likhovtseva	6	6
(Japan) A Morigami	3	2
WC	(United States) L Osterloh	3	6	3
(Italy) R Oprandi	6	3	6

Second round
16	(Japan) A Sugiyama	6	7^{7}
Q	(China) M Yuan	4	6^{3}
(Czech Republic) I Benešová	5	2
20	(Italy) T Garbin	7	6
26	(Russia) O Poutchkova	6^{3}	2
(Russia) E Likhovtseva	7^{7}	6
(Italy) R Oprandi	5	3
2	(Russia) S Kuznetsova	7	6

Third round
16	(Japan) A Sugiyama	6^{4}	6	6
20	(Italy) T Garbin	7^{7}	1	1
(Russia) E Likhovtseva	1	6^{4}
2	(Russia) S Kuznetsova	6	7^{7}

Fourth round
16	(Japan) A Sugiyama	2	2
2	(Russia) S Kuznetsova	6	6
