= Viktoriya Kutuzova =

Ukrainian tennis player (born 1988)

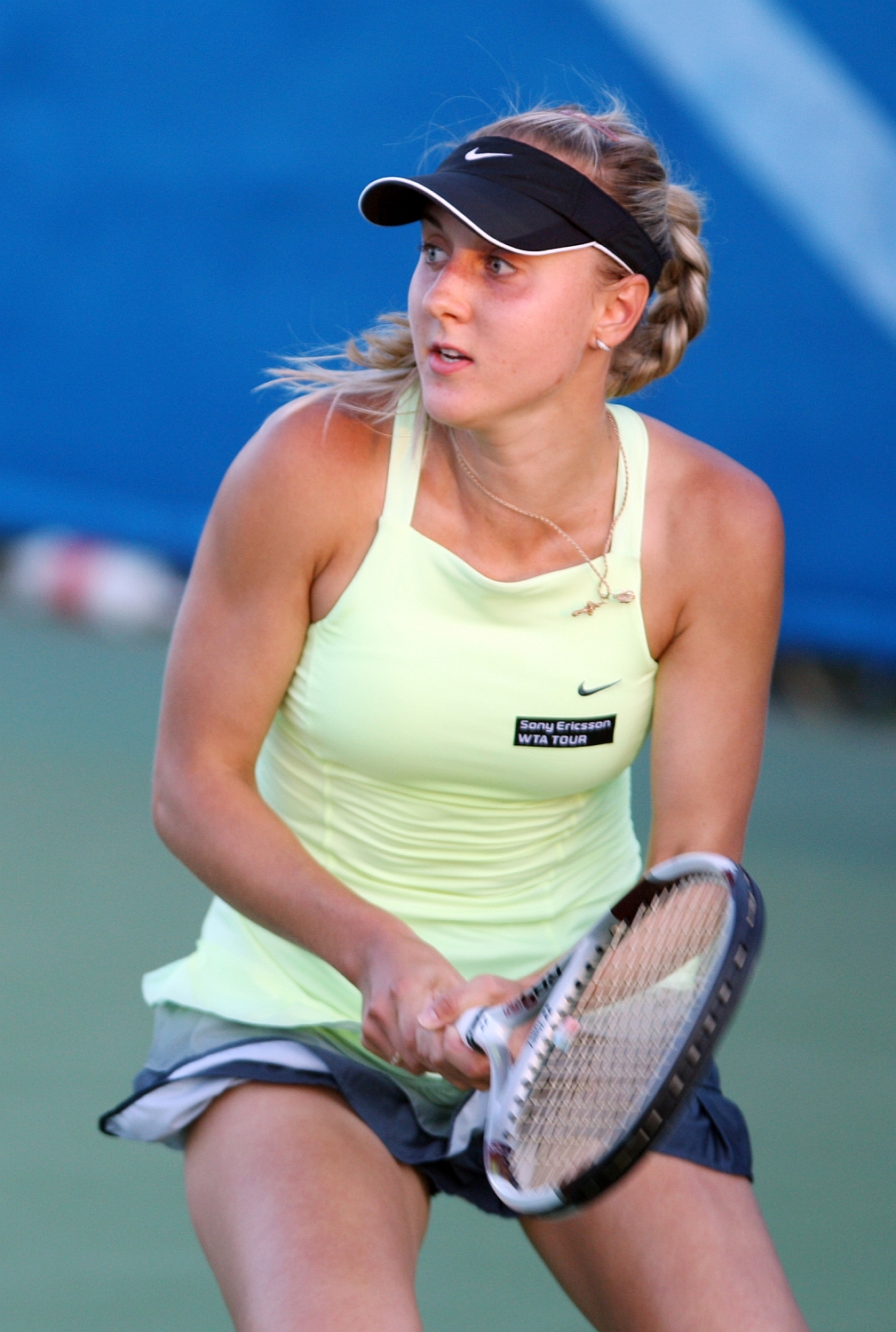
- Country (sports): Ukraine
- Residence: Odesa, Ukraine
- Born: 19 August 1988 (age 38) Odesa, Ukrainian SSR, Soviet Union
- Height: 1.69 m (5 ft 7 in)
- Turned pro: 2003
- Retired: 2014
- Plays: Right (two-handed backhand)
- Prize money: $586,580

Singles
- Career record: 190–135
- Career titles: 6 ITF
- Highest ranking: No. 76 (28 November 2005)

Grand Slam singles results
- Australian Open: 1R (2006, 2009, 2010)
- French Open: 2R (2006, 2009)
- Wimbledon: 2R (2006)
- US Open: 2R (2006)

Doubles
- Career record: 10–23
- Highest ranking: No. 285 (20 April 2009)

Grand Slam doubles results
- Australian Open: 2R (2006)
- French Open: 1R (2009)
- Wimbledon: 1R (2009)

Viktoriya Kutuzova (Ukrainian: Вікторія Кутузова, romanized: Viktoriia Kutuzova, born 19 August 1988) is a former tennis player from Ukraine. On 28 November 2005, she reached a career-high singles ranking of world No. 76.

== Career ==
Even though considered a potential superstar on tour, Kutuzova remained most notable for her results as a 14-year-old. In her debut WTA Tour main-draw event, the Tier-II tournament in Los Angeles 2003, Kutuzova beat top-50 player Lina Krasnoroutskaya in the first round, and top-30 player Alexandra Stevenson in her next match, before losing in the third round to then-world No. 12, Ai Sugiyama.

Other career highlights in WTA Tour events included a fourth-round appearance at the Tier-I event at Indian Wells 2005, eventually losing to then-No. 1, Lindsay Davenport. Kutuzova also made the second round at three of the four major events on the professional tour.

As a junior, she reached the final of the Australian Open in 2003 losing to Barbora Záhlavová-Strýcová.

Kutuzova experienced considerable success on the ITF Circuit. She won four French ITF events. In 2008, Kutuzova won her biggest ITF title in Cagnes-sur-Mer. Her other titles came in Poitiers (2005) and Deauville (2005 and 2006). In 2009, she reached the final of the $100k event in Torhout, losing to Karolina Šprem, in straight sets.

Kutuzova suffered from shoulder problems throughout her young career which stalled her progression on the main tour.

After having over a year off-tour, Kutuzova used her protected ranking to enter her first big event, the 2011 Sparta Prague Open, where she lost to Katarzyna Piter in round one. She also entered Roland Garros using protected ranking, but was beaten by Chanelle Scheepers, also in the first round.

== ITF Circuit finals ==
Legend
$100,000 tournaments
$75,000 tournaments
$50,000 tournaments
$25,000 tournaments
$10,000 tournaments

=== Singles (6–2) ===
Result	No.	Date	Tournament	Surface	Opponent	Score
Loss	1	Jul 2005	ITF Pétange, Luxembourg	Clay	(Belarus) Victoria Azarenka	4–6, 2–6
Win	2	Nov 2005	ITF Deauville, France	Clay	(Bulgaria) Tsvetana Pironkova	6–4, 7–6^{(7–2)}
Win	3	Nov 2005	Internationaux de Poitiers, France	Hard	(Estonia) Maret Ani	6–3, 3–6, 6–4
Win	4	Nov 2006	ITF Deauville, France	Clay	(Italy) Alberta Brianti	6–1, 6–2
Win	5	4 May 2008	Open de Cagnes-sur-Mer, France	Clay	(Estonia) Maret Ani	6–1, 7–5
Loss	6	Apr 2009	Torhout Open, Belgium	Hard	(Croatia) Karolina Šprem	1–6, 4–6
Win	7	Aug 2011	ITF Bucharest, Romania	Clay	(Romania) Laura Ioana Andrei	6–2, 7–5
Win	8	Dec 2011	ITF Antalya, Turkey	Clay	(Romania) Patricia Maria Tig	3–6, 6–1, 6–1

=== Doubles (0–1) ===
Result	Date	Tournament	Surface	Partner	Opponents	Score
Loss	Jun 2008	Open de Marseille, France	Clay	(Russia) Anna Lapushchenkova	(Romania) Ágnes Szatmári (France) Aurélie Védy	4–6, 3–6

== Performance timeline ==
Key
W	F	SF	QF	#R	RR	Q#	DNQ	A	NH

(W) winner; (F) finalist; (SF) semifinalist; (QF) quarterfinalist; (#R) rounds 4, 3, 2, 1; (RR) round-robin stage; (Q#) qualification round; (DNQ) did not qualify; (A) absent; (NH) not held; (SR) strike rate (events won / competed); (W–L) win–loss record.

=== Singles ===
Tournament	2005	2006	2007	2008	2009	2010	2011	W–L
Australian Open	A	1R	Q1	A	1R	1R	A	0–3
French Open	A	2R	Q2	Q1	2R	A	1R	2–3
Wimbledon	Q3	2R	1R	1R	1R	A	A	1–4
US Open	1R	2R	Q3	A	1R	A	A	1–3
Win–loss	0–1	3–4	0–1	0–1	1–4	0–1	0–1	4–13
