= Fernando González career statistics =

This is a list of the main career statistics of Chilean professional tennis player Fernando González.

== Significant finals ==
=== Grand Slam finals ===
==== Singles: 1 ( 1 runner-up) ====
Result	Year	Championship	Surface	Opponent	Score
Loss	2007	Australian Open	Hard	(Switzerland) Roger Federer	6–7^{(2–7)}, 4–6, 4–6

=== Olympic finals ===
==== Singles: 2 (1 silver, 1 bronze medal) ====
Result	Year	Tournament	Surface	Opponent	Score
Bronze	2004	Athens Olympics	Hard	(United States) Taylor Dent	6–4, 2–6, 16–14
Silver	2008	Beijing Olympics	Hard	(Spain) Rafael Nadal	3–6, 6–7^{(2–7)}, 3–6

==== Doubles: 1 (1 gold medal) ====
Result	Year	Tournament	Surface	Opponents	Partner	Score
Gold	2004	Athens Olympics	Hard	(Chile) Nicolás Massú	(Germany) Nicolas Kiefer (Germany) Rainer Schüttler	6–2, 4–6, 3–6, 7–6^{(9–7)}, 6–4

=== Masters Series finals ===
==== Singles: 2 (2 runner-ups) ====
Result	Year	Tournament	Surface	Opponent	Score
Loss	2006	Madrid	Hard (i)	(Switzerland) Roger Federer	5–7, 1–6, 0–6
Loss	2007	Rome	Clay	(Spain) Rafael Nadal	2–6, 2–6

== Career finals ==
=== Singles: 22 (11 titles, 11 runner-ups) ===
Legend Grand Slam tournaments (0–1) Olympic Games (0–1) ATP World Tour Finals (0–0) ATP World Tour Masters 1000 (0–2) ATP World Tour 500 Series (0–1) ATP World Tour 250 Series (11–6)	Titles by surface Hard (2–6) Clay (8–3) Grass (0–0) Carpet (1–2)

Result	W–L	Date	Tournament	Surface	Opponent	Score
Win	1–0	May 2000	Orlando, U.S.	Clay	(Chile) Nicolás Massú	6–2, 6–3
Win	2–0	Feb 2002	Viña del Mar, Chile	Clay	(Ecuador) Nicolás Lapentti	6–3, 6–7^{(5–7)}, 7–6^{(7–4)}
Win	3–0	Sep 2002	Palermo, Italy	Clay	(Argentina) José Acasuso	5–7, 6–3, 6–1
Loss	3–1	Oct 2002	Basel, Switzerland	Carpet (i)	(Argentina) David Nalbandian	4–6, 3–6, 2–6
Loss	3–2	Aug 2003	Washington, D.C., U.S.	Hard	(United Kingdom) Tim Henman	3–6, 4–6
Loss	3–3	Oct 2003	Metz, France	Hard (i)	(France) Arnaud Clément	3–6, 6–1, 3–6
Win	4–3	Feb 2004	Viña del Mar, Chile (2)	Clay	(Brazil) Gustavo Kuerten	7–5, 6–4
Loss	4–4	Jul 2004	Amersfoort, Netherlands	Clay	(Netherlands) Martin Verkerk	6–7^{(5–7)}, 6–4, 4–6
Win	5–4	Jan 2005	Auckland, New Zealand	Hard	(Belgium) Olivier Rochus	6–4, 6–2
Loss	5–5	Feb 2005	Viña del Mar, Chile	Clay	(Argentina) Gastón Gaudio	3–6, 4–6
Win	6–5	Jul 2005	Amersfoort, Netherlands	Clay	(Argentina) Agustín Calleri	7–5, 6–3
Win	7–5	Oct 2005	Basel, Switzerland	Carpet (i)	(Cyprus) Marcos Baghdatis	6–7^{(8–10)}, 6–3, 7–5, 6–4
Loss	7–6	Oct 2006	Vienna, Austria	Hard (i)	(Croatia) Ivan Ljubičić	3–6, 4–6, 5–7
Loss	7–7	Oct 2006	Madrid, Spain	Hard (i)	(Switzerland) Roger Federer	5–7, 1–6, 0–6
Loss	7–8	Oct 2006	Basel, Switzerland	Carpet (i)	(Switzerland) Roger Federer	3–6, 2–6, 6–7^{(3–7)}
Loss	7–9	Jan 2007	Australian Open, Melbourne, Australia	Hard	(Switzerland) Roger Federer	6–7^{(2–7)}, 4–6, 4–6
Loss	7–10	May 2007	Rome, Italy	Clay	(Spain) Rafael Nadal	2–6, 2–6
Win	8–10	Sep 2007	Beijing, China	Hard	(Spain) Tommy Robredo	6–1, 3–6, 6–1
Win	9–10	Feb 2008	Viña del Mar, Chile (3)	Clay	(Argentina) Juan Mónaco	W/O
Win	10–10	May 2008	Munich, Germany	Clay	(Italy) Simone Bolelli	7–6^{(7–4)}, 6–7^{(4–7)}, 6–3
Loss	10–11	Aug 2008	Summer Olympics, Beijing, China	Hard	(Spain) Rafael Nadal	3–6, 6–7^{(2–7)}, 3–6
Win	11–11	Feb 2009	Viña del Mar, Chile (4)	Clay	(Argentina) José Acasuso	6–1, 6–3

=== Doubles: 4 (3 titles, 1 runner-ups) ===
Legend Grand Slam tournaments (0–0) Olympic Games (1–0) ATP World Tour Finals (0–0) ATP World Tour Masters 1000 (0–0) ATP World Tour 500 Series (0–0) ATP World Tour 250 Series (2–1)	Titles by surface Hard (1–0) Clay (1-1) Grass (0–0) Carpet (1–0)

Result	W–L	Date	Tournament	Surface	Partner	Opponents	Score
Win	1–0	Aug 2004	Summer Olympics, Athens, Greece	Hard	(Chile) Nicolás Massú	(Germany) Nicolas Kiefer (Germany) Rainer Schüttler	6–2, 4–6, 3–6, 7–6^{(9–7)}, 6–4
Win	2–0	Apr 2005	Valencia, Spain	Clay	(Argentina) Martín Rodríguez	(Argentina) Lucas Arnold Ker (Argentina) Mariano Hood	6–4, 6–4
Loss	2–1	Jul 2005	Amersfoort, Netherlands	Clay	(Chile) Nicolás Massú	(Argentina) Martín García (Peru) Luis Horna	4–6, 4–6
Win	3–1	Oct 2005	Basel, Switzerland	Carpet (i)	(Argentina) Agustín Calleri	(Australia) Stephen Huss (South Africa) Wesley Moodie	7–5, 7–5

=== Team competition wins ===
Result	No.	Date	Tournament	Surface	Partners	Opponents	Score
Win	1.	24 May 2003	World Team Cup; Düsseldorf, Germany	Clay	(Chile) Nicolás Massú (Chile) Marcelo Ríos	(Czech Republic) Jiří Novák (Czech Republic) Radek Štěpánek	2–1
Win	2.	22 May 2004	World Team Cup; Düsseldorf, Germany	Clay	(Chile) Adrián García (Chile) Nicolás Massú	(Australia) Wayne Arthurs (Australia) Paul Hanley (Australia) Lleyton Hewitt (Australia) Mark Philippoussis	2–1

== Performance timeline ==
Key
W	F	SF	QF	#R	RR	Q#	P#	DNQ	A	Z#	PO	G	S	B	NMS	NTI	P	NH

(W) winner; (F) finalist; (SF) semifinalist; (QF) quarterfinalist; (#R) rounds 4, 3, 2, 1; (RR) round-robin stage; (Q#) qualification round; (P#) preliminary round; (DNQ) did not qualify; (A) absent; (Z#) Davis/Fed Cup Zonal Group (with number indication) or (PO) play-off; (G) gold, (S) silver or (B) bronze Olympic/Paralympic medal; (NMS) not a Masters tournament; (NTI) not a Tier I tournament; (P) postponed; (NH) not held; (SR) strike rate (events won / competed); (W–L) win–loss record.

=== Singles performance timeline ===
Tournament	1998	1999	2000	2001	2002	2003	2004	2005	2006	2007	2008	2009	2010	2011	2012	W–L
Grand Slam Tournaments
Australian Open	A	A	A	1R	4R	2R	1R	3R	1R	F	3R	4R	4R	A	A	20–10
French Open	A	A	Q1	2R	3R	QF	1R	3R	2R	1R	QF	SF	2R	A	A	20–10
Wimbledon	A	A	A	Q1	2R	1R	3R	QF	3R	3R	2R	3R	A	3R	A	16–9
US Open	A	A	2R	Q1	QF	3R	1R	3R	3R	1R	4R	QF	1R	1R	A	18–11
Win–loss	0–0	0–0	1–1	1–2	10–4	7–4	2–4	10–4	5–4	8–4	10–4	14–4	4–3	2–2	0–0	74–40
Year-end championship
Tennis Masters Cup								RR		RR						2–3
Olympic Games
Summer Olympics	not held		A	not held			SF-B	not held			F-S	not held			A	10–2
Davis Cup
Davis Cup	Z1	PO	PO		Z1	Z1	PO	1R	QF	1R	PO		QF	1R		20–7
ATP Masters Series
Indian Wells	A	A	A	A	2R	1R	3R	4R	2R	4R	2R	4R	A	A	A	8–8
Miami	A	A	A	A	4R	2R	SF	3R	3R	3R	3R	3R	4R	A	1R	13–10
Monte-Carlo	A	A	A	A	1R	1R	1R	3R	SF	2R	A	A	A	A	A	6–6
Rome	A	A	A	A	3R	A	2R	1R	QF	F	3R	SF	A	A	A	16–6
Hamburg^{1}	A	A	A	A	2R	QF	3R	2R	3R	QF	A	A	A	A	A	11–6
Canada	A	A	A	A	1R	1R	3R	1R	SF	2R	2R	3R	A	A	A	9–8
Cincinnati	A	A	Q2	A	SF	2R	2R	3R	SF	2R	1R	1R	A	A	A	12–8
Madrid^{2}	A	A	A	A	2R	1R	2R	QF	F	QF	2R	3R	A	A	A	10–8
Paris	A	A	A	A	1R	1R	2R	2R	2R	2R	A	3R	A	A	A	1–7
Win–loss	0–0	0–0	0–0	0–0	12–9	4–8	11–9	9–9	21–9	11–9	4–5	12–7	2–1	0–0	0–1	86–67
Career statistics
Titles	0	0	1	0	2	0	1	3	0	1	2	1	0	0	0	11
Finals reached	0	0	1	0	3	2	2	4	3	3	3	1	0	0	0	22
Overall win–loss	0–1	3–1	9–5	5–10	40–22	37–24	42–21	49–23	49–22	37–24	39–15	39–16	15–9	3–5	3–4	370–202
Year-end ranking	580	412	115	139	18	35	23	11	10	7	15	11	68	298	509	$8,288,402

=== Doubles performance timeline ===
Tournament	1998	1999	2000	2001	2002	2003	2004	2005	2006	2007	2008	2009	2010	2011	2012	W–L
Grand Slam tournaments
Australian Open	A	A	A	A	A	1R	1R	A	A	A	A	1R	QF	A	A	3–4
French Open	A	A	A	A	A	A	A	SF	A	A	A	QF	A	A	A	7–1
Wimbledon	A	A	A	A	A	A	A	2R	A	A	A	A	A	A	A	1–1
US Open	A	A	A	A	A	1R	QF	3R	2R	A	2R	A	A	A	A	7–4
Win–loss	0–0	0–0	0–0	0–0	0–0	0–2	3–2	7–3	1–1	0–0	1–0	3–1	3–1	0–0	0–0	18–10
Olympic Games
Summer Olympics	not held			not held			G	not held			1R	not held				5–1
Davis Cup
Davis Cup	Z1	PO	PO	PO	Z1	Z1	PO	1R	QF	1R	PO					11–6
ATP Masters Series
Indian Wells						1R	2R	1R	1R	1R	1R	QF				3–5
Miami						SF	1R	1R	1R		2R	1R				4–6
Monte Carlo						1R	QF	QF	1R	QF						6–5
Rome							1R	1R	SF	1R	1R					3–4
Hamburg^{1}						1R		2R	1R							1–3
Canada							2R	1R	2R	2R	1R					3–5
Cincinnati							QF			1R	1R					2–2
Madrid^{2}					2R		1R	1R	1R	2R	1R					2–6
Paris					1R		QF			2R		1R				2–3
Win–loss	0–0	0–0	0–0	0–0	1–2	3–4	7–7	3–7	4–7	5–6	1–4	2–2	0–0	0–0	0–0	26–39
Career statistics
Overall win–loss	1–0	1–0	4–3	0–2	3–6	11–12	23–14	26–16	11–12	11–12	5–10	9–9	4–3	0–0	0–0	109–99
Year-end ranking	880T	557	363	650	229	128	67	25	95	102	290	91	154	-	-	$513,005

^{1}Held as Hamburg Masters till 2008. Held as Madrid Masters 2009–2012.
^{2}Held as Stuttgart Masters till 2001, Madrid Masters from 2002–2008, and Shanghai Masters 2009–2012.

== Top 10 wins ==
Season	1998	1999	2000	2001	2002	2003	2004	2005	2006	2007	2008	2009	2010	2011	2012	Total
Wins	0	0	0	0	5	3	2	3	5	4	2	3	0	0	0	27

#	Player	Rank	Event	Surface	Rd	Score	González Rank
2002
1.	(United Kingdom) Tim Henman	5	Rome, Italy	Clay	1R	3–6, 7–6^{(7–5)}, 6–0	55
2.	(United Kingdom) Tim Henman	4	Cincinnati, United States	Hard	2R	7–6^{(7–3)}, 6–2	39
3.	(United States) Andy Roddick	9	Cincinnati, United States	Hard	QF	7–6^{(7–4)}, 7–6^{(8–6)}	39
4.	(Spain) Juan Carlos Ferrero	7	US Open, New York, United States	Hard	3R	6–4, 6–4, 6–4	28
5.	(Spain) Juan Carlos Ferrero	4	Basel, Switzerland	Carpet (i)	SF	6–4, 4–6, 6–1	20
2003
6.	(Australia) Lleyton Hewitt	1	Hamburg, Germany	Clay	3R	6–1, 3–6, 6–0	23
7.	(Argentina) David Nalbandian	8	World Team Cup, Düsseldorf, Germany	Clay	RR	6–4, 7–5	20
8.	(United States) Andre Agassi	1	Washington D.C., United States	Hard	SF	3–6, 6–4, 7–6^{(7–5)}	14
2004
9.	(Germany) Rainer Schüttler	8	Toronto, Canada	Hard	1R	3–6, 6–4, 6–3	19
10.	(United States) Andy Roddick	2	Summer Olympics, Athens, Greece	Hard	3R	6–4, 6–4	21
2005
11.	(Sweden) Joachim Johansson	10	Wimbledon, London, United Kingdom	Grass	3R	6–4, 6–4, 6–2	24
12.	(Argentina) Guillermo Coria	7	Madrid, Spain	Hard (i)	3R	7–5, 6–3	19
13.	(Argentina) Mariano Puerta	10	Tennis Masters Cup, Shanghai, China	Carpet (i)	RR	6–3, 4–6, 6–0	13
2006
14.	(United States) James Blake	8	Davis Cup, Rancho Mirage, United States	Grass	RR	6–7^{(5–7)}, 0–6, 7–6^{(7–2)}, 6–4, 10–8	18
15.	(Croatia) Ivan Ljubičić	5	Monte Carlo, Monaco	Clay	QF	7–5, 6–1	21
16.	(Croatia) Ivan Ljubičić	4	Toronto, Canada	Hard	3R	6–4, 6–7^{(4–7)}, 7–6^{(7–3)}	16
17.	(Argentina) David Nalbandian	4	Vienna, Austria	Hard (i)	QF	3–6, 6–3, 6–1	10
18.	(United States) Andy Roddick	6	Vienna, Austria	Hard (i)	SF	6–4, 3–6, 7–6^{(7–5)}	10
2007
19.	(United States) James Blake	5	Australian Open, Melbourne, Australia	Hard	4R	7–5, 6–4, 7–6^{(7–4)}	9
20.	(Spain) Rafael Nadal	2	Australian Open, Melbourne, Australia	Hard	QF	6–2, 6–4, 6–3	9
21.	(United States) James Blake	8	World Team Cup, Düsseldorf, Germany	Clay	RR	6–4, 7–5	5
22.	(Switzerland) Roger Federer	1	Tennis Masters Cup, Shanghai, China	Hard (i)	RR	3–6, 7–6^{(7–1)}, 7–5	7
2008
23.	(Switzerland) Stan Wawrinka	10	French Open, Paris, France	Clay	3R	5–7, 2–6, 6–4, 6–4, 6–4	25
24.	(United States) James Blake	7	Summer Olympics, Beijing, China	Hard	SF	4–6, 7–5, 11–9	15
2009
25.	(Spain) Fernando Verdasco	7	Barcelona, Spain	Clay	QF	6–3, 4–6, 6–4	14
26.	(United Kingdom) Andy Murray	3	French Open, Paris, France	Clay	QF	6–3, 3–6, 6–0, 6–4	12
27.	(France) Jo-Wilfried Tsonga	7	US Open, New York, United States	Hard	4R	3–6, 6–3, 7–6^{(7–3)}, 6–4	11
