= 2005 Dutch Open – Singles =

Singles
- 2005 Dutch Open

Final
- Champion: (Chile) Fernando González
- Runner-up: (Argentina) Agustín Calleri
- Score: 7–5, 6–3

Details
- Draw: 32
- Seeds: 8

Events
Singles	Doubles
← 2004 ·	Dutch Open	· 2006 →

Martin Verkerk was the defending champion, but did not participate this year.

Fernando González won the tournament, beating Agustín Calleri in the final, 7–5, 6–3.

== Seeds ==
1. (Argentina) Mariano Puerta (quarterfinals)
2. (Chile) Fernando González (champion)
3. (Chile) Nicolás Massú (quarterfinals)
4. (Belgium) Christophe Rochus (second round)
5. (Peru) Luis Horna (first round)
6. (Romania) Victor Hănescu (second round)
7. (Spain) Óscar Hernández (first round)
8. (Germany) Tomas Behrend (first round)

== Draw ==
=== Key ===
- Q = Qualifier
- WC = Wild card
- LL = Lucky loser
- Alt = Alternate
- ITF = ITF entry
- PR = Protected ranking
- SR = Special ranking
- SE = Special exempt
- JE = Junior exempt
- JR = Junior Accelerator Programme entrant
- CO = College Accelerator Programme entrant
- NG = Next Gen Accelerator Program entrant
- w/o = Walkover
- r = Retired
- d = Defaulted

=== Finals ===
Semifinals
(Czech Republic) Ivo Minář	4	4
(Argentina) Agustín Calleri	6	6
(Spain) David Sánchez	2	1
2	(Chile) Fernando González	6	6

Final
(Argentina) Agustín Calleri	5	3
2	(Chile) Fernando González	7	6

=== Top half ===
First round
1	(Argentina) M Puerta	6	6
(Serbia and Montenegro) J Tipsarević	2	2
Q	(Costa Rica) JA Marín	7^{7}	6
(Italy) F Aldi	6^{5}	1
(Czech Republic) I Minář	6	6
(France) F Serra	4	2
(Spain) S Ventura	3	6	6
7	(Spain) Ó Hernández	6	0	1
4	(Belgium) C Rochus	4	6	7
(Czech Republic) M Tabara	6	2	5
WC	(Netherlands) M van Gemerden	6
WC	(Netherlands) D van Scheppingen	0	r
Q	(France) J Benneteau	4	6	3
(Argentina) A Calleri	6	2	6
WC	(Netherlands) S Korteling	4	5
6	(Romania) V Hănescu	6	7

Second round
1	(Argentina) M Puerta	6	6
Q	(Costa Rica) JA Marín	2	2
(Czech Republic) I Minář	7^{7}	6
(Spain) S Ventura	6^{5}	4
4	(Belgium) C Rochus	2	5
WC	(Netherlands) M van Gemerden	6	7
(Argentina) A Calleri	7^{7}	6
6	(Romania) V Hănescu	6^{5}	4

Quarterfinals
(Argentina) M Puerta	2	7	6^{4}
(Czech Republic) I Minář	6	5	7^{7}
WC	(Netherlands) M van Gemerden	4	4
(Argentina) A Calleri	6	6

Semifinals
(Czech Republic) I Minář	4	4
(Argentina) A Calleri	6	6

=== Bottom half ===
First round
8	(Germany) T Behrend	4	5
(Spain) D Sánchez	6	7
LL	(Argentina) S Roitman	6	3	5
(Spain) Á Calatrava	3	6	7
(Belgium) D Norman	7^{7}	2	3
(Czech Republic) J Vaněk	6^{5}	6	6
Q	(France) N Thomann	4	2
3	(Chile) N Massú	6	6
5	(Peru) L Horna	7^{9}	3	5
(Netherlands) R Sluiter	6^{7}	6	7
Q	(Czech Republic) R Žitko	6^{2}	3
(Italy) D Bracciali	7^{7}	6
(Ecuador) N Lapentti	1	3
(Czech Republic) R Vik	6	6
(Belgium) K Vliegen	2	1
2	(Chile) F González	6	6

Second round
(Spain) D Sánchez	6	6
(Spain) Á Calatrava	2	2
(Czech Republic) J Vaněk	4	5
3	(Chile) N Massú	6	7
(Netherlands) R Sluiter	6	6^{5}	2
(Italy) D Bracciali	1	7^{7}	6
(Czech Republic) R Vik	2	2
2	(Chile) F González	6	6

Quarterfinals
(Spain) D Sánchez	6	4	6
3	(Chile) N Massú	3	6	3
(Italy) D Bracciali	3	3
2	(Chile) F González	6	6

Semifinals
(Spain) D Sánchez	2	1
2	(Chile) F González	6	6
