= 2005 Dutch Open (tennis) =

- Date: 18–24 July
- Edition: 48th
- Category: International Series
- Draw: 32S / 16D
- Prize money: €323,250
- Surface: Clay / outdoor
- Location: Amersfoort, Netherlands

Champions

Singles
- (Chile) Fernando González

Doubles
- (Argentina) Martín García / (Peru) Luis Horna
- Dutch Open

The 2005 Dutch Open, also known by its sponsored name The Priority Telecom Open, was an ATP men's tennis tournament staged in Amersfoort, Netherlands and part of the International Series of the 2005 ATP Tour. It was the 48th edition of the tournament and was held from 18 July until 24 July 2005. Second-seeded Fernando González won his second event of the year, and the sixth title of his professional career.

== Finals ==
=== Singles ===
(Chile) Fernando González defeated (Argentina) Agustín Calleri 7–5, 6–3

- It was González' 2nd singles title of the year and the 6th of his career.

=== Doubles ===
(Argentina) Martín García / (Peru) Luis Horna defeated (Chile) Fernando González / (Chile) Nicolás Massú 6–4, 6–4
