= Melle van Gemerden =

Dutch tennis player

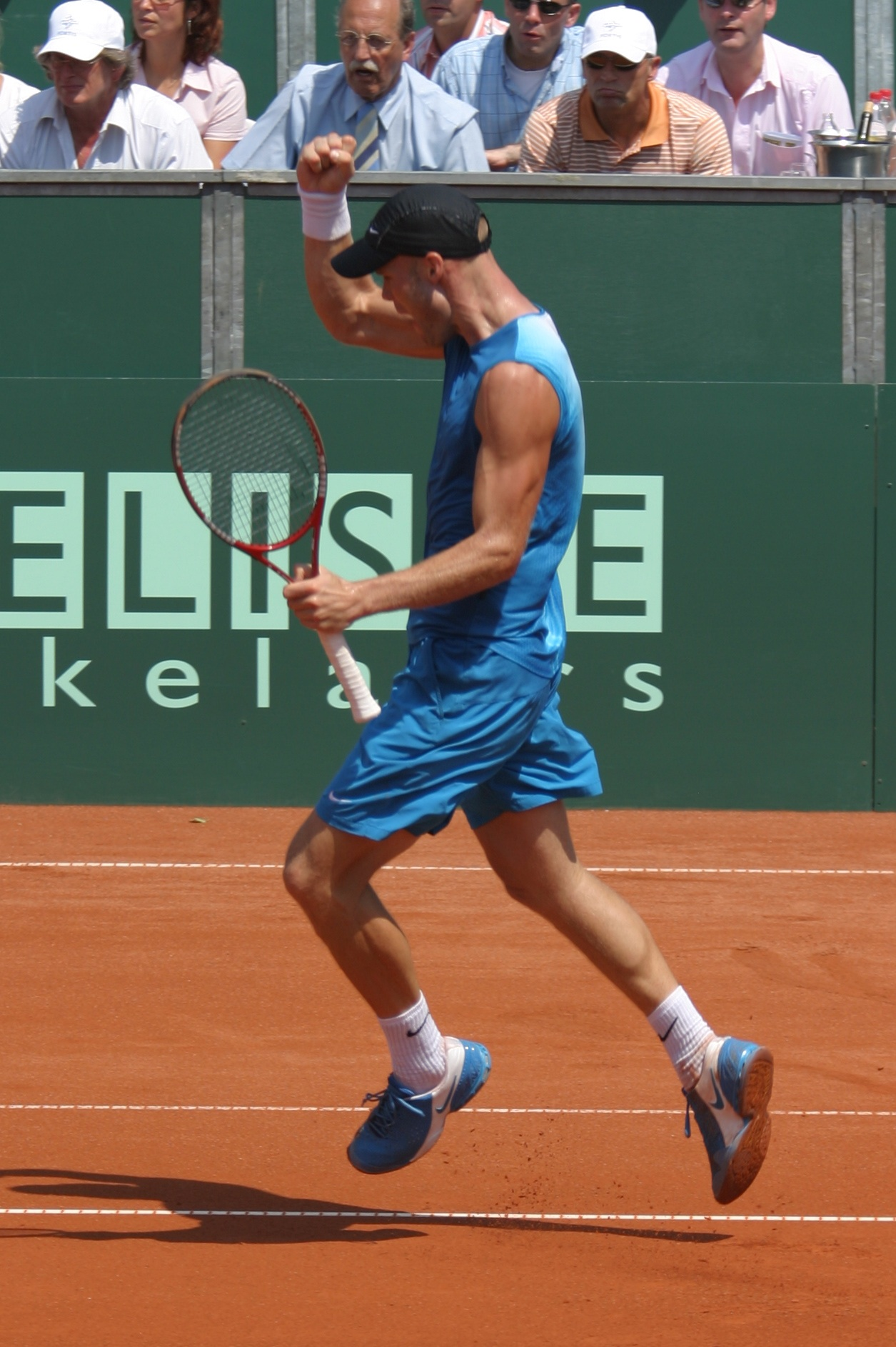
- Country (sports): Netherlands
- Residence: Amsterdam, Netherlands
- Born: 9 May 1979 (age 47) Amsterdam, Netherlands
- Height: 1.83 m (6 ft 0 in)
- Retired: 2014
- Plays: Right-handed
- Prize money: $214,727

Singles
- Career record: 4–9
- Career titles: 0
- Highest ranking: No. 100 (12 June 2006)

Grand Slam singles results
- Australian Open: 1R (2005)
- French Open: 1R (2006)
- Wimbledon: 2R (2006)
- US Open: Q1 (2008)

Doubles
- Career record: 0–4
- Career titles: 0
- Highest ranking: No. 178 (4 April 2005)
- Last updated on: 5 June 2021.

Melle van Gemerden (Dutch pronunciation: [ˈmɛlə vɑŋ ˈɣeːmərdə(n)]; born 9 May 1979) is a former professional tennis player from the Netherlands. He peaked his career as ATP singles world ranking as nr. 100 by June, 2006, maintaining it for a month.

== Career ==
Van Gemerden made one time appearances in all Grand Slams and was also briefly a Davis Cup representative member of the Netherlands team.

He marked the beginning of his career in 1997, with the Dutch Junior Champion under 18, indoor and outdoor titles. In 1998–1999 he comprised the Jong Oranje - a prized contract presented by the KNLTB to Netherlands' most proficient junior players. During a Mauritius Challenger tournament, late in December 2004, he was tested positive for a metabolite of cannabis or tetrahydrocannabinol (THC). Whilst the ATP tribunal accepted Van Gemerden had committed a doping offense under the rules of the Tennis Anti-Doping Program with Exceptional Circumstances; the use of cannabis, in that case, was determined to not be for performance enhancing reasons. It was ruled he forfeit US$2,950 in prize money and all ranking points won at the Mauritius Challenger. Although he was eligible to return to competition immediately, Van Gemerden voluntarily sat out. Coming after, in July 2005, he defeated Kristof Vliegen, triumphing the Scheveningen Challenger.

Van Gemerden played for the Netherlands Davis Cup team from 2004 to 2006. He took on Slovakia in the 2005 World Group quarter-finals and appeared both in the doubles, with Paul Haarhuis, and in the singles against Michal Mertiňák. He lost both of those matches and was also unable to register a win in the two other Davis Cup matches of his career, singles rubbers against Russians Nikolay Davydenko and Dmitry Tursunov in 2006.

The Dutch tennis player begin his appearance at Grand Slams starting with the 2005 Australian Open, where he was drawn up against 31st seed Juan Carlos Ferrero, who won the match in four sets. The same year, he was a quarter-finalist in the 2005 Dutch Open, beating world number 46 Christophe Rochus en route. The following year, in 2006, he played in both the French Open and Wimbledon Championships. In France he lost in the opening round to Juan Mónaco but he made the second round of Wimbledon, beating Josh Goodall, before being eliminated from the tournament by Mardy Fish. Van Gemerden made it to US OPEN by 2008, being defeated by Jean-Yves Aubone at the first round.

Van Gemerden carried as a hitting partner, from 2008 to 2010 to Ana Ivanovic and Fernando Verdasco, coached at different times by Sven Groeneveld; and Sorana Cîrstea, coached by Rodrigo Nascimento. Then, turned into professional tennis coach to Thiemo de Bakker, from 2014 until 2015; and Christian Lerby, for 5 months, in 2018.

== ATP Challenger and ITF Futures Finals ==
=== Singles: 9 (4–5) ===
Legend (singles) ATP Challenger Tour (1–2) ITF World Tennis Tour (3–3)	Finals by surface Hard (0–0) Clay (4–5) Grass (0–0) Carpet (0–0)

Result	W–L	Date	Tournament	Tier	Surface	Opponent	Score
Win	1–0	Jun 2000	Germany F6, Villingen	Futures	Clay	(Russia) Nikolay Davydenko	6–1, 7–6^{(7–5)}
Win	2–0	Jun 2000	Germany F7, Trier	Futures	Clay	(Russia) Nikolay Davydenko	4–6, 6–4, 6–3
Loss	2–1	May 2004	Germany F5, Esslingen	Futures	Clay	(Germany) Tobias Summerer	5–7, 6–7^{(5–7)}
Loss	2–2	May 2004	Hungary F2, Hódmezővásárhely	Futures	Clay	(Hungary) Kornél Bardóczky	5–7, 3–6
Win	3–2	Jul 2004	Netherlands F2, Heerhugowaard	Futures	Clay	(Netherlands) Fred Hemmes Jr.	6–3, 6-3
Loss	3–3	Sep 2004	Tehran, Iran	Challenger	Clay	(Argentina) Mariano Puerta	3–6, 4–6
Win	4–3	Jul 2005	Scheveningen, Netherlands	Challenger	Clay	(Belgium) Kristof Vliegen	6–4, 6-3
Loss	4–4	Aug 2005	Manerbio, Italy	Challenger	Clay	(Austria) Oliver Marach	3–6, 2–6
Loss	4–5	Jun 2008	Netherlands F2, Alkmaar	Futures	Clay	(Netherlands) Thiemo de Bakker	6–4, 1–6, 2–6

=== Doubles: 17 (6–11) ===
Legend (singles) ATP Challenger Tour (3–4) ITF World Tennis Tour (3–7)	Finals by surface Hard (0–5) Clay (6–6) Grass (0–0) Carpet (0–0)

Result	W–L	Date	Tournament	Tier	Surface	Partner	Opponents	Score
Loss	0–1	Oct 1998	France F10, Saint-Dizier	Futures	Hard	(Netherlands) Gordon Bergraaf	(Czech Republic) Pavel Kudrnáč (Czech Republic) Radim Žitko	4–6, 4–6
Win	1–1	May 1999	Germany F4, Villingen	Futures	Clay	(Netherlands) Martijn Belgraver	(Germany) Patrick Sommer (Germany) Rene Nicklisch	7–5, 6–2
Loss	1–2	May 2000	Germany F2, Esslingen	Futures	Clay	(Sweden) Johan Settergren	(Lebanon) Ali Hamadeh (Lebanon) Jicham Zaatini	4–6, 1–6
Loss	1–3	Jun 2000	Germany F6, Villingen	Futures	Clay	(Sweden) Johan Settergren	(Belgium) Kris Goossens (Romania) Ionuț Moldovan	6–7^{(6–8)}, 3–6
Loss	1–4	Oct 2000	France F23, La Roche-sur-Yon	Futures	Hard	(Sweden) Johan Settergren	(Slovakia) Martin Hromec (Belgium) Wim Neefs	3–6, 6–1, 6–7^{(8–10)}
Win	2–4	Jun 2001	Germany F4, Villingen	Futures	Clay	(Sweden) Johan Settergren	(Germany) Frank Moser (Germany) Bernard Parun	6–4, 6–4
Loss	2–5	Mar 2002	New Zealand F1, Blenheim	Futures	Hard	(Sweden) Fredrik Lovén	(Australia) Ashley Ford (Australia) David Mcnamara	1–6, 7–5, 4–6
Loss	2–6	Sep 2002	Netherlands F2, Alphen aan den Rijn	Futures	Clay	(Netherlands) Melvyn op der Heijde	(Spain) O. Hernandez-Perez (Argentina) Gustavo Marcaccio	2–6, 3–6
Win	3–6	Oct 2003	Greece F3, Athens	Futures	Clay	(Germany) Christian Grunes	(Greece) Theodoros Angelinos (Greece) Konstantinos Economidis	4–6, 6–3, 7–6^{(7–1)}
Loss	3–7	May 2004	Hungary F2, Hódmezővásárhely	Futures	Clay	(Hungary) Zsolt Tatár	(Hungary) Kornél Bardóczky (Romania) Gabriel Moraru	5–7, 7–6^{(7–3)}, 3–6
Win	4–7	Jul 2004	Hilversum, Netherlands	Challenger	Clay	(Netherlands) Fred Hemmes Jr.	(Hungary) Attila Sávolt (Romania) Gabriel Trifu	7–6^{(7–3)}, 7–6^{(7–3)}
Win	5–7	Aug 2004	Samarkand, Uzbekistan	Challenger	Clay	(France) Jean-François Bachelot	(Germany) Sebastian Fitz (Romania) Florin Mergea	6–2, 3–6, 6–1
Loss	5–8	Aug 2004	Bukhara, Uzbekistan	Challenger	Hard	(Netherlands) Paul Logtens	(Slovakia) Michal Mertiňák (Czech Republic) Pavel Šnobel	4–6, 2–6
Loss	5–9	Oct 2004	Bolton, United Kingdom	Challenger	Hard	(Netherlands) Peter Wessels	(South Africa) Jeff Coetzee (United States) Jim Thomas	5–7, 3–6
Win	6–9	Aug 2005	Manerbio, Italy	Challenger	Clay	(Netherlands) Peter Wessels	(Austria) Oliver Marach (Austria) Daniel Köllerer	6–3, 6–4
Loss	6–10	Jun 2008	Alessandria, Italy	Challenger	Clay	(Netherlands) Matwé Middelkoop	(Italy) Flavio Cipolla (Italy) Simone Vagnozzi	6–3, 1–6, [4–10]
Loss	6–11	Jul 2008	Scheveningen, Netherlands	Challenger	Clay	(Netherlands) Matwé Middelkoop	(Australia) Rameez Junaid (Germany) Philipp Marx	7–5, 2–6, [6–10]
