= Radim Žitko =

Czech tennis player (born 1978)

- Country (sports): Czech Republic
- Born: 8 December 1978 (age 46)
- Plays: Right-handed
- Prize money: $83,012

Singles
- Career record: 0–2
- Highest ranking: No. 253 (11 Sep 2006)

Grand Slam singles results
- US Open: Q2 (2006)

Doubles
- Highest ranking: No. 515 (8 Mar 2004)

Radim Žitko (born 8 December 1978) is a Czech former professional tennis player.

Žitko, who comes from Plzeň, had a career best singles ranking of 253 in the world and won six titles at ITF Futures level. He made ATP Tour main draw appearances at the 2001 Japan Open and the 2005 Dutch Open. In 2006 he featured in the qualifying draw for the US Open.

Locally, Žitko played club tennis for TK Slavia Plzeň and also competed in the German Bundesliga for TB Erlangen.

== ITF Futures titles ==
=== Singles: (6) ===
No.	Date	Tournament	Surface	Opponent	Score
1.	Sep 1999	Germany F10, Oberhaching	Carpet	(Croatia) Ivo Karlović	6–1, 6–2
2.	Nov 2000	Australia F1, Beaumaris	Hard	(Australia) Paul Hanley	6–2, 6–4
3.	Sep 2001	Japan F7, Chiba	Hard	(Australia) Ashley Ford	6–4, 4–6, 7–6^{(13)}
4.	Jun 2003	Czech Rep. F2, Karlovy Vary	Clay	(Czech Republic) Tomáš Cakl	4–6, 6–1, 7–6^{(2)}
5.	Feb 2006	Australia F1, Sydney	Carpet	(Australia) Nathan Healey	3–6, 6–4, 6–4
6.	May 2006	Poland F4, Katowice	Clay	(Sweden) Michael Ryderstedt	6–7^{(1)}, 6–2, 6–4

=== Doubles: (5) ===
No.	Date	Tournament	Surface	Partner	Opponents	Score
1.	Oct 1998	France F9, Forbach	Carpet	(Czech Republic) Pavel Kudrnáč	(Ivory Coast) Claude N'Goran (France) Nicolas Perrein	6–1, 6–4
2.	Oct 1998	France F10, Saint-Dizier	Hard	(Czech Republic) Pavel Kudrnáč	(Netherlands) Gordon Bergraaf (Netherlands) Melle van Gemerden	6–4, 6–4
3.	Jun 2003	Georgia F1, Tbilisi	Clay	(Czech Republic) Jaroslav Pospíšil	(Russia) Mikhail Elgin (Ukraine) Orest Tereshchuk	1–6, 7–5, 7–5
4.	May 2006	Poland F4, Katowice	Clay	(Czech Republic) Michal Navrátil	(Poland) Radosław Nijaki (Poland) Filip Urban	6–2, 6–7^{(5)}, 6–3
5.	Nov 2008	Dominican Republic F2, Santo Domingo	Hard	(Belgium) David Goffin	(Georgia (country)) Lado Chikhladze (Germany) David Klier	7–6^{(8)}, 3–6, [10–3]
