= 2005 Dutch Open – Doubles =

Doubles
- 2005 Dutch Open

Final
- Champions: (Argentina) Martín García (Peru) Luis Horna
- Runners-up: (Chile) Fernando González (Chile) Nicolás Massú
- Score: 6–4, 6–4

Events
Singles	Doubles
← 2004 ·	Dutch Open	· 2006 →

Jaroslav Levinský and David Škoch were the defending champions, but Levinský did not participate this year. Škoch partnered Jiří Vaněk, losing in the semifinals.

Martín García and Luis Horna won in the final 6–4, 6–4, against Fernando González and Nicolás Massú.

== Seeds ==
1. (Chile) Fernando González / (Chile) Nicolás Massú (final)
2. (Poland) Mariusz Fyrstenberg / (Poland) Marcin Matkowski (quarterfinals)
3. (France) Jean-François Bachelot / (France) Julien Benneteau (semifinals)
4. (Argentina) Martín García / (Peru) Luis Horna (champions)

== Draw ==
=== Key ===
- Q = Qualifier
- WC = Wild card
- LL = Lucky loser
- Alt = Alternate
- SE = Special exempt
- PR = Protected ranking
- ITF = ITF entry
- JE = Junior exempt
- w/o = Walkover
- r = Retired
- d = Defaulted
- SR = Special ranking

=== Draw ===
First round
1	(Chile) F González (Chile) N Massú	6	6
(Netherlands) R Sluiter (Netherlands) R Wassen	1	2
(Belgium) C Rochus (Belgium) T Vanhoudt	0	5
(Ecuador) N Lapentti (Spain) Á López Morón	6	7
3	(France) J-F Bachelot (France) J Benneteau	6	6
Alt	(Argentina) A Calleri (Argentina) S Roitman	2	4
(Italy) D Bracciali (Italy) G Galimberti	6	6
(Romania) V Hănescu (Romania) G Trifu	4	4
(Argentina) L Arnold (Argentina) M Puerta	6	6
(Italy) E Artoni (Sweden) R Lindstedt	3	2
WC	(Netherlands) R Haase (Netherlands) I Sijsling	0	3
4	(Argentina) M García (Peru) L Horna	6	6
(Czech Republic) D Škoch (Czech Republic) J Vaněk	6	6
Alt	(Czech Republic) I Minář (Czech Republic) R Vik	3	1
(Germany) T Behrend (Czech Republic) T Cibulec	6	1	4
2	(Poland) M Fyrstenberg (Poland) M Matkowski	4	6	6

Quarterfinals
1	(Chile) F González (Chile) N Massú	6	6
(Ecuador) N Lapentti (Spain) Á López Morón	4	4
3	(France) J-F Bachelot (France) J Benneteau	6	6
(Italy) D Bracciali (Italy) G Galimberti	3	2
(Argentina) L Arnold (Argentina) M Puerta	3	4
4	(Argentina) M García (Peru) L Horna	6	6
(Czech Republic) D Škoch (Czech Republic) J Vaněk	6	6
2	(Poland) M Fyrstenberg (Poland) M Matkowski	4	4

Semifinals
1	(Chile) F González (Chile) N Massú	6	6
3	(France) J-F Bachelot (France) J Benneteau	4	3
4	(Argentina) M García (Peru) L Horna	7^{7}	6
(Czech Republic) D Škoch (Czech Republic) J Vaněk	6^{4}	3

Final
1	(Chile) F González (Chile) N Massú	4	4
4	(Argentina) M García (Peru) L Horna	6	6
