= 2006 Wimbledon Championships – Men's singles =

Men's singles
- 2006 Wimbledon Championships

Final
- Champion: (Switzerland) Roger Federer
- Runner-up: (Spain) Rafael Nadal
- Score: 6–0, 7–6^{(7–5)}, 6–7^{(2–7)}, 6–3

Details
- Draw: 128 (16 Q / 8 WC )
- Seeds: 32

Events
Singles	men	women		boys	girls
Doubles	men	women	mixed	boys	girls
WC Singles	men	women	quad
WC Doubles	men	women	quad
Legends	men	women	seniors
← 2005 ·	Wimbledon Championships	· 2007 →

Three-time defending champion Roger Federer defeated Rafael Nadal in the final, 6–0, 7–6^{(7–5)}, 6–7^{(2–7)}, 6–3 to win the gentlemen's singles tennis title at the 2006 Wimbledon Championships. It was his fourth Wimbledon title and eighth major title overall. It was the first of three consecutive years when Federer and Nadal would contest the Wimbledon final.

This marked the last Wimbledon appearance of 1992 champion and former world No. 1, Andre Agassi; he lost to Nadal in the third round.

== Seeds ==
1. (Switzerland) Roger Federer (champion)
2. (Spain) Rafael Nadal (final)
3. (United States) Andy Roddick (third round)
4. (Argentina) David Nalbandian (third round)
5. (Croatia) Ivan Ljubičić (third round)
6. (Australia) Lleyton Hewitt (quarterfinals)
7. (Croatia) Mario Ančić (quarterfinals)
8. (United States) James Blake (third round)
9. (Russia) Nikolay Davydenko (first round)
10. (Chile) Fernando González (third round)
11. (Spain) Tommy Robredo (second round)
12. (Sweden) Thomas Johansson (first round)
13. (Czech Republic) Tomáš Berdych (fourth round)
14. (Czech Republic) Radek Štěpánek (quarterfinals)
15. (France) Sébastien Grosjean (third round)
16. (Argentina) Gastón Gaudio (second round)
17. (United States) Robby Ginepri (first round)
18. (Cyprus) Marcos Baghdatis (semifinals)
19. (Germany) Tommy Haas (third round)
20. (Slovakia) Dominik Hrbatý (first round)
21. (France) Gaël Monfils (first round)
22. (Finland) Jarkko Nieminen (quarterfinals)
23. (Spain) David Ferrer (fourth round)
24. (Spain) Juan Carlos Ferrero (third round)
25. (United States) Andre Agassi (third round)
26. (Belgium) Olivier Rochus (third round)
27. (Russia) Dmitry Tursunov (fourth round)
28. (Spain) Fernando Verdasco (fourth round)
29. (Thailand) Paradorn Srichaphan (first round)
30. (Belgium) Kristof Vliegen (second round)
31. (Chile) Nicolás Massú (first round)
32. (France) Paul-Henri Mathieu (first round)

Click on the seed number of a player to go to their draw section.

== Draw ==
=== Key ===
- Q = Qualifier
- WC = Wild card
- LL = Lucky loser
- Alt = Alternate
- ITF = ITF entry
- PR = Protected ranking
- SR = Special ranking
- SE = Special exempt
- JE = Junior exempt
- JR = Junior Accelerator Programme entrant
- CO = College Accelerator Programme entrant
- NG = Next Gen Accelerator Program entrant
- w/o = Walkover
- r = Retired
- d = Defaulted

=== Finals ===
Quarterfinals
1	(Switzerland) Roger Federer	6	6	6
7	(Croatia) Mario Ančić	4	4	4
14	(Czech Republic) Radek Štěpánek	6^{3}	6	7^{7}	6^{7}	4
(Sweden) Jonas Björkman	7^{7}	4	6^{5}	7^{9}	6
6	(Australia) Lleyton Hewitt	1	7	6^{5}	2
18	(Cyprus) Marcos Baghdatis	6	5	7^{7}	6
22	(Finland) Jarkko Nieminen	3	4	4
2	(Spain) Rafael Nadal	6	6	6

Semifinals
1	(Switzerland) Roger Federer	6	6	6
(Sweden) Jonas Björkman	2	0	2
18	(Cyprus) Marcos Baghdatis	1	5	3
2	(Spain) Rafael Nadal	6	7	6

Final
1	(Switzerland) Roger Federer	6	7^{7}	6^{2}	6
2	(Spain) Rafael Nadal	0	6^{5}	7^{7}	3

=== Top half ===
==== Section 1 ====
First round
1	(Switzerland) R Federer	6	6	6
(France) R Gasquet	3	2	2
(Sweden) R Söderling	7^{10}	3	2	6	3
(United Kingdom) T Henman	6^{8}	6	6	1	6
(France) N Mahut	6^{3}	7	6	6
(Austria) J Melzer	7^{7}	5	1	4
PR	(Czech Republic) J Novák	4	5	2
30	(Belgium) K Vliegen	6	7	6
19	(Germany) T Haas	7^{7}	7	6
(Czech Republic) J Vaněk	6^{2}	5	4
(Argentina) C Berlocq	1	2	2
WC	(United Kingdom) R Bloomfield	6	6	6
Q	(Australia) W Arthurs	6^{3}	3	6	1
(France) F Santoro	7^{7}	6	3	6
(Czech Republic) J Hernych	3	4	5
13	(Czech Republic) T Berdych	6	6	7

Second round
1	(Switzerland) R Federer	6	6	6
(United Kingdom) T Henman	4	0	2
(France) N Mahut	6	6	6
30	(Belgium) K Vliegen	4	4	3
19	(Germany) T Haas	6	6	7^{7}
WC	(United Kingdom) R Bloomfield	3	4	6^{4}
(France) F Santoro	4	7^{8}	6	6^{5}	4
13	(Czech Republic) T Berdych	6	6^{6}	2	7^{7}	6

Third round
1	(Switzerland) R Federer	6	7^{7}	6
(France) N Mahut	3	6^{2}	4
19	(Germany) T Haas	6	5	6^{7}	6	6
13	(Czech Republic) T Berdych	2	7	7^{9}	4	8

Fourth round
1	(Switzerland) R Federer	6	6	6
13	(Czech Republic) T Berdych	3	3	4

==== Section 2 ====
First round
11	(Spain) T Robredo	6	6	5	7^{7}
(Germany) S Greul	2	2	7	6^{3}
(United States) P Goldstein	3	2	6^{3}
(Serbia) N Djokovic	6	6	7^{7}
(Italy) P Starace	0	4	1
(Russia) M Youzhny	6	6	6
(Russia) I Kunitsyn	5	7^{9}	6	6
21	(France) G Monfils	7	6^{7}	3	4
29	(Thailand) P Srichaphan	7^{7}	5	3	6	3
(Argentina) A Calleri	6^{3}	7	6	3	6
(Croatia) I Karlović	6^{5}	6	2	7^{10}	9
(Switzerland) S Wawrinka	7^{7}	3	6	6^{8}	11
(Italy) D Sanguinetti	6	7^{12}	6
Q	(United States) K Kim	3	6^{10}	1
(Spain) N Almagro	6^{2}	5	6^{4}
7	(Croatia) M Ančić	7^{7}	7	7^{7}

Second round
11	(Spain) T Robredo	6^{5}	2	4
(Serbia) N Djokovic	7^{7}	6	6
(Russia) M Youzhny	6	6	3
(Russia) I Kunitsyn	3	1	0^{r}
(Argentina) A Calleri	6^{5}	5	3
(Switzerland) S Wawrinka	7^{7}	7	6
(Italy) D Sanguinetti	4	2	1
7	(Croatia) M Ančić	6	6	6

Third round
(Serbia) N Djokovic	4	6	6	6
(Russia) M Youzhny	6	2	3	3
(Switzerland) S Wawrinka	6^{5}	7^{7}	1	3
7	(Croatia) M Ančić	7^{7}	6^{5}	6	6

Fourth round
(Serbia) N Djokovic	4	6	6	5	3
7	(Croatia) M Ančić	6	4	4	7	6

==== Section 3 ====
First round
4	(Argentina) D Nalbandian	6	6	6
(South Africa) W Moodie	3	4	1
(Spain) A Portas	3	2	4
(France) A Clément	6	6	6
Q	(Germany) B Becker	6	3	6	6
(Argentina) JI Chela	3	6	3	4
(United States) V Spadea	6	4	6^{1}	3
28	(Spain) F Verdasco	3	6	7^{7}	6
24	(Spain) JC Ferrero	6	6	6
(Spain) F Vicente	1	3	2
Q	(Croatia) R Karanušić	7^{9}	4	6	6
(Germany) R Schüttler	6^{7}	6	2	1
(Belgium) X Malisse	6	7	6
Q	(Germany) B Dorsch	2	5	2
Q	(Canada) F Dancevic	6^{4}	3	4
14	(Czech Republic) R Štěpánek	7^{7}	6	6

Second round
4	(Argentina) D Nalbandian	6	6	6
(France) A Clément	4	4	3
Q	(Germany) B Becker	4	7^{9}	6	3	7
28	(Spain) F Verdasco	6	6^{7}	4	6	9
24	(Spain) JC Ferrero	6	7^{7}	6
Q	(Croatia) R Karanušić	3	6^{4}	3
(Belgium) X Malisse	3	7^{7}	5	1
14	(Czech Republic) R Štěpánek	6	6^{4}	7	6

Third round
4	(Argentina) D Nalbandian	6^{9}	6^{9}	2
28	(Spain) F Verdasco	7^{11}	7^{11}	6
24	(Spain) JC Ferrero	7	7^{7}	4	2	9
14	(Czech Republic) R Štěpánek	5	6^{3}	6	6	11

Fourth round
28	(Spain) F Verdasco	7^{7}	3	6	4	2
14	(Czech Republic) R Štěpánek	6^{4}	6	4	6	6

==== Section 4 ====
First round
12	(Sweden) T Johansson	6	6^{4}	1	1
(Sweden) J Björkman	3	7^{7}	6	6
(France) F Serra	6	3	4	5
(Czech Republic) L Dlouhý	4	6	6	7
Q	(Italy) S Galvani	4	7^{7}	6	3	16
(Germany) A Waske	6	6^{2}	4	6	14
(Italy) D Bracciali	6	6	6
20	(Slovakia) D Hrbatý	2	4	4
32	(France) P-H Mathieu	7	6^{5}	3	6^{12}
WC	(Australia) M Philippoussis	5	7^{7}	6	7^{14}
(Belarus) M Mirnyi	6^{5}	6	6	6
(Spain) R Ramírez Hidalgo	7^{7}	4	3	3
(Austria) O Marach	1	6^{2}	0
(Chinese Taipei) J Wang	6	7^{7}	6
Q	(Denmark) K Pless	3	5	7	4
8	(United States) J Blake	6	7	5	6

Second round
(Sweden) J Björkman	6	6	4	1	6
(Czech Republic) L Dlouhý	3	4	6	6	4
Q	(Italy) S Galvani	3	7^{7}	3	4
(Italy) D Bracciali	6	6^{3}	6	6
WC	(Australia) M Philippoussis	6^{6}	4	7^{7}	3
(Belarus) M Mirnyi	7^{8}	6	6^{5}	6
(Chinese Taipei) Y-t Wang	4	2	6	2
8	(United States) J Blake	6	6	4	6

Third round
(Sweden) J Björkman	7	6	6
(Italy) D Bracciali	5	2	1
(Belarus) M Mirnyi	6	3	4	6	6
8	(United States) J Blake	4	6	6	1	0

Fourth round
(Sweden) J Björkman	6	7^{8}	4	2	6
(Belarus) M Mirnyi	3	6^{6}	6	6	3

=== Bottom half ===
==== Section 5 ====
First round
6	(Australia) L Hewitt	6	6	6
(Italy) F Volandri	1	1	3
(Brazil) F Saretta	6^{10}	3	5
(South Korea) H-t Lee	7^{12}	6	7
(Spain) A Montañés	3	4	6^{7}
(Czech Republic) T Zíb	6	6	7^{9}
(Luxembourg) G Müller	4	5	3
26	(Belgium) O Rochus	6	7	6
23	(Spain) D Ferrer	6	6	6
Q	(Germany) S Stadler	1	4	4
(Czech Republic) I Minář	6^{1}	6	6^{3}	2
(Spain) G García López	7^{7}	4	7^{7}	6
(United Kingdom) G Rusedski	4	4	4
(Russia) M Safin	6	6	6
(Peru) L Horna	6^{3}	5	2
10	(Chile) F González	7^{7}	7	6

Second round
6	(Australia) L Hewitt	6^{4}	6	7^{8}	6^{5}	6
(South Korea) H-t Lee	7^{7}	2	6^{6}	7^{7}	4
(Czech Republic) T Zíb	1	1	0
26	(Belgium) O Rochus	6	6	6
23	(Spain) D Ferrer	7^{7}	7	6
(Spain) G García López	6^{2}	5	3
(Russia) M Safin	6	7^{7}	4	4	4
10	(Chile) F González	4	6^{4}	6	6	6

Third round
6	(Australia) L Hewitt	6	6	6
26	(Belgium) O Rochus	1	4	4
23	(Spain) D Ferrer	4	2	6	6	6
10	(Chile) F González	6	6	2	3	4

Fourth round
6	(Australia) L Hewitt	6	6	4	7
23	(Spain) D Ferrer	4	4	6	5

==== Section 6 ====
First round
15	(France) S Grosjean	6	6	6
(France) G Simon	4	2	4
WC	(United Kingdom) J Delgado	6	6	3	3	6
Q	(Germany) M Berrer	4	2	6	6	3
Q	(Spain) M Granollers	6^{4}	4	4
WC	(Romania) A Pavel	7^{7}	6	6
WC	(United Kingdom) A Mackin	4	7^{7}	7^{7}	5	2
18	(Cyprus) M Baghdatis	6	6^{4}	6^{4}	7	6
31	(Chile) N Massú	1	4	4
(United Kingdom) A Murray	6	6	6
(Germany) B Phau	7	4	2	6^{6}
(France) J Benneteau	5	6	6	7^{8}
(Czech Republic) R Vik	3	3	3
(Germany) F Mayer	6	6	6
(Serbia) J Tipsarević	7^{7}	4	6^{6}	2
3	(United States) A Roddick	6^{5}	6	7^{8}	6

Second round
15	(France) S Grosjean	6	3	6	6
WC	(United Kingdom) J Delgado	3	6	2	3
WC	(Romania) A Pavel	0^{r}
18	(Cyprus) M Baghdatis	3
(United Kingdom) A Murray	7^{7}	6	4	6
(France) J Benneteau	6^{5}	4	6	1
(Germany) F Mayer	4	1	2
3	(United States) A Roddick	6	6	6

Third round
15	(France) S Grosjean	6	4	4	1
18	(Cyprus) M Baghdatis	4	6	6	6
(United Kingdom) A Murray	7^{7}	6	6
3	(United States) A Roddick	6^{4}	4	4

Fourth round
18	(Cyprus) M Baghdatis	6	6	7^{7}
(United Kingdom) A Murray	3	4	6^{2}

==== Section 7 ====
First round
5	(Croatia) I Ljubičić	6	6	5	3	11
(Spain) F López	3	4	7	6	9
(United States) J Gimelstob	6	6	6
(Belgium) C Rochus	3	4	4
(Italy) A di Mauro	3	4	1
(Spain) A Martín	6	6	6
(Thailand) D Udomchoke	1	4	2
27	(Russia) D Tursunov	6	6	6
22	(Finland) J Nieminen	6	6	7
(Brazil) M Daniel	2	4	5
(Belgium) D Norman	2	6^{2}	6^{4}
WC	(United Kingdom) M Lee	6	7^{7}	7^{7}
(Romania) R Sabău	3	2	4
(Germany) P Kohlschreiber	6	6	6
Q	(Colombia) A Falla	2	7^{7}	7^{10}	6
9	(Russia) N Davydenko	6	6^{4}	6^{8}	3

Second round
5	(Croatia) I Ljubičić	6	7^{7}	7
(United States) J Gimelstob	3	6^{1}	5
(Spain) A Martín	1	5	4
27	(Russia) D Tursunov	6	7	6
22	(Finland) J Nieminen	6	6	6
WC	(United Kingdom) M Lee	4	0	3
(Germany) P Kohlschreiber	6	6	3	7^{7}
Q	(Colombia) A Falla	4	4	6	6^{1}

Third round
5	(Croatia) I Ljubičić	7	6	1	6^{6}	2
27	(Russia) D Tursunov	5	4	6	7^{8}	6
22	(Finland) J Nieminen	1	6	6	7^{7}
(Germany) P Kohlschreiber	6	2	3	6^{4}

Fourth round
27	(Russia) D Tursunov	5	4	7^{7}	7^{8}	7
22	(Finland) J Nieminen	7	6	6^{2}	6^{6}	9

==== Section 8 ====
First round
16	(Argentina) G Gaudio	7	3	6	6
LL	(France) J-C Faurel	5	6	2	4
Q	(Austria) A Peya	4	6	7	3	1
Q	(Georgia (country)) I Labadze	6	4	5	6	6
(Netherlands) M van Gemerden	6	7	7
Q	(United Kingdom) J Goodall	4	5	5
(United States) M Fish	6	6	6
17	(United States) R Ginepri	3	2	4
25	(United States) A Agassi	2	6	6	6
(Serbia) B Pašanski	6	2	4	3
(Italy) A Seppi	6	6^{3}	6	6
WC	(United Kingdom) J Baker	3	7^{7}	4	3
(Chinese Taipei) Y-h Lu	6^{5}	3	0
Q	(United States) R Kendrick	7^{7}	6	6
WC	(United Kingdom) A Bogdanovic	4	6^{3}	4
2	(Spain) R Nadal	6	7^{7}	6

Second round
16	(Argentina) G Gaudio	4	2	3
Q	(Georgia (country)) I Labadze	6	6	6
(Netherlands) M van Gemerden	2	0	1
(United States) M Fish	6	6	6
25	(United States) A Agassi	6	7^{7}	6
(Italy) A Seppi	4	6^{2}	4
Q	(United States) R Kendrick	7^{7}	6	6^{2}	5	4
2	(Spain) R Nadal	6^{4}	3	7^{7}	7	6

Third round
Q	(Georgia (country)) I Labadze	6	0
(United States) M Fish	2	0^{r}
25	(United States) A Agassi	6^{5}	2	4
2	(Spain) R Nadal	7^{7}	6	6

Fourth round
Q	(Georgia (country)) I Labadze	3	6^{4}	3
2	(Spain) R Nadal	6	7^{7}	6

Preceded by 2006 French Open – Men's singles	Grand Slam men's singles	Succeeded by 2006 US Open – Men's singles
