= 2006 French Open – Men's singles =

Men's singles
- 2006 French Open

Final
- Champion: (Spain) Rafael Nadal
- Runner-up: (Switzerland) Roger Federer
- Score: 1–6, 6–1, 6–4, 7–6^{(7–4)}

Details
- Draw: 128
- Seeds: 32

Events
Singles	men	women		boys	girls
Doubles	men	women	mixed	boys	girls
WC Singles	men	women	quad
WC Doubles	men	women	quad
Legends	−45	45+	women
← 2005 ·	French Open	· 2007 →

Defending champion Rafael Nadal defeated Roger Federer in the final, 1–6, 6–1, 6–4, 7–6^{(7–4)} to win the men's singles tennis title at the 2006 French Open. It was his second French Open title and second major title overall. It was the first of three consecutive years Nadal and Federer would contest the French Open final. This marked Federer's first defeat in a major final, having won his first seven finals; he was attempting to complete the career Grand Slam and to become the first man since Rod Laver in 1969 to hold all four major titles at once, having won the preceding Wimbledon Championships, US Open and Australian Open. The latter feat would ultimately be achieved a decade later by Novak Djokovic, at the same tournament, who here reached the quarterfinals at a major for the first time.

The tournament marked the first major appearance of future US Open champion Juan Martín del Potro. It also saw the first match contested between Djokovic and Nadal and the first of their ten meetings at the French Open. They would go on to play an Open Era record of 60 matches against each other.

== Seeds ==
1. (Switzerland) Roger Federer (final)
2. (Spain) Rafael Nadal (champion)
3. (Argentina) David Nalbandian (semifinals, retired because of a strained abdominal muscle)
4. (Croatia) Ivan Ljubičić (semifinals)
5. (United States) Andy Roddick (first round, retired because of a left ankle injury)
6. (Russia) Nikolay Davydenko (quarterfinals)
7. (Spain) Tommy Robredo (fourth round)
8. (United States) James Blake (third round)
9. (Chile) Fernando González (second round)
10. (Argentina) Gastón Gaudio (fourth round)
11. (Czech Republic) Radek Štěpánek (third round)
12. (Croatia) Mario Ančić (quarterfinals)
13. (Germany) Nicolas Kiefer (third round, retired because of a left wrist injury)
14. (Australia) Lleyton Hewitt (fourth round)
15. (Spain) David Ferrer (third round)
16. (Finland) Jarkko Nieminen (first round, retired because of a stomach problem)

17. (United States) Robby Ginepri (first round)
18. (Sweden) Thomas Johansson (first round)
19. (Cyprus) Marcos Baghdatis (second round)
20. (Czech Republic) Tomáš Berdych (fourth round)
21. (France) Sébastien Grosjean (second round)
22. (Slovakia) Dominik Hrbatý (third round)
23. (Germany) Tommy Haas (third round)
24. (Spain) Juan Carlos Ferrero (third round)
25. (France) Gaël Monfils (fourth round)
26. (Argentina) José Acasuso (second round)
27. (Belgium) Olivier Rochus (third round)
28. (Spain) Fernando Verdasco (second round)
29. (France) Paul-Henri Mathieu (third round)
30. (Spain) Carlos Moyá (third round)
31. (Russia) Dmitry Tursunov (third round)
32. (Chile) Nicolás Massú (third round)

Click on the seed number of a player to go to their draw section.

== Draw ==
=== Key ===
- Q = Qualifier
- WC = Wild card
- LL = Lucky loser
- Alt = Alternate
- ITF = ITF entry
- PR = Protected ranking
- SR = Special ranking
- SE = Special exempt
- JE = Junior exempt
- JR = Junior Accelerator Programme entrant
- CO = College Accelerator Programme entrant
- NG = Next Gen Accelerator Program entrant
- w/o = Walkover
- r = Retired
- d = Defaulted

=== Finals ===
Quarterfinals
1	(Switzerland) Roger Federer	6	6	6
12	(Croatia) Mario Ančić	4	3	4
3	(Argentina) David Nalbandian	6	6	2	6
6	(Russia) Nikolay Davydenko	3	3	6	4
(France) Julien Benneteau	2	2	3
4	(Croatia) Ivan Ljubičić	6	6	6
(Serbia and Montenegro) Novak Djokovic	4	4	0^{r}
2	(Spain) Rafael Nadal	6	6	0

Semifinals
1	(Switzerland) Roger Federer	3	6	5
3	(Argentina) David Nalbandian	6	4	2^{r}
4	(Croatia) Ivan Ljubičić	4	2	6^{7}
2	(Spain) Rafael Nadal	6	6	7^{9}

Final
1	(Switzerland) Roger Federer	6	1	4	6^{4}
2	(Spain) Rafael Nadal	1	6	6	7^{7}

=== Top half ===
==== Section 1 ====
First round
1	(Switzerland) R Federer	7	7^{7}	6
Q	(Argentina) D Hartfield	5	6^{2}	2
LL	(Colombia) A Falla	6	6	6
(United States) J Gimelstob	4	4	2
(Luxembourg) G Müller	3	1	6^{3}
(Belarus) M Mirnyi	6	6	7^{7}
(Belgium) X Malisse	1	5	6	6	7
32	(Chile) N Massú	6	7	1	4	9
20	(Czech Republic) T Berdych	6	6	6
(Spain) F López	2	4	3
Q	(Denmark) K Pless	4	6^{0}	4
(Italy) F Volandri	6	7^{7}	6
WC	(France) M Gicquel	7	7^{8}	6
(Italy) A di Mauro	5	6^{6}	3
(Austria) J Melzer	6^{4}	3	1
13	(Germany) N Kiefer	7^{7}	6	6

Second round
1	(Switzerland) R Federer	6	6	6
LL	(Colombia) A Falla	1	4	3
(Belarus) M Mirnyi	4	5	4
32	(Chile) N Massú	6	7	6
20	(Czech Republic) T Berdych	6	6	6
(Italy) F Volandri	3	1	1
WC	(France) M Gicquel	0	1	7	6	9
13	(Germany) N Kiefer	6	6	5	3	11

Third round
1	(Switzerland) R Federer	6	6	6^{4}	7
32	(Chile) N Massú	1	2	7^{7}	5
20	(Czech Republic) T Berdych	6	0
13	(Germany) N Kiefer	1	0^{r}

Fourth round
1	(Switzerland) R Federer	6	6	6
20	(Czech Republic) T Berdych	3	2	3

==== Section 2 ====
First round
12	(Croatia) M Ančić	6	4	7^{7}	6
WC	(Australia) N Healey	3	6	6^{3}	1
(Chile) P Capdeville	6	6	4	7^{9}
(United Kingdom) G Rusedski	3	1	6	6^{7}
(Germany) F Mayer	6	0	6^{4}	6	5
Q	(Italy) S Galvani	4	6	7^{7}	3	7
(Spain) A Montañés	6	6^{2}	6	6
17	(United States) R Ginepri	3	7^{7}	1	4
26	(Argentina) J Acasuso	6	6	3	1	11
(France) F Santoro	3	1	6	6	9
(Czech Republic) L Dlouhý	4	6	3	7^{7}	6
(Belgium) K Vliegen	6	4	6	6^{5}	2
(Serbia and Montenegro) B Pašanski	4	3	4
Q	(Serbia and Montenegro) I Bozoljac	6	6	6
(Czech Republic) T Zíb	4	2	2
7	(Spain) T Robredo	6	6	6

Second round
12	(Croatia) M Ančić	7	6	7^{7}
(Chile) P Capdeville	5	3	6^{3}
Q	(Italy) S Galvani	5	1	6	6	4
(Spain) A Montañés	7	6	3	2	6
26	(Argentina) J Acasuso	6	6^{2}	3	1
(Czech Republic) L Dlouhý	4	7^{7}	6	6
Q	(Serbia and Montenegro) I Bozoljac	5	2	6	1
7	(Spain) T Robredo	7	6	3	6

Third round
12	(Croatia) M Ančić	6	6	6
(Spain) A Montañés	1	2	4
(Czech Republic) L Dlouhý	1	4	2
7	(Spain) T Robredo	6	6	6

Fourth round
12	(Croatia) M Ančić	6	4	2	6	7
7	(Spain) T Robredo	4	6	6	4	5

==== Section 3 ====
First round
3	(Argentina) D Nalbandian	6	7^{7}	6
(Switzerland) S Wawrinka	2	6^{5}	4
(France) R Gasquet	6	6	7
(Chinese Taipei) Y-t Wang	4	1	5
(Denmark) K Carlsen	3	4	6	4
(United Kingdom) T Henman	6	6	4	6
(Czech Republic) J Novák	2	3	2
31	(Russia) D Tursunov	6	6	6
21	(France) S Grosjean	6	6	6
(Romania) A Pavel	3	2	3
Q	(Argentina) M Vassallo Argüello	6	6	6
(United States) P Goldstein	2	0	3
(South Africa) W Moodie	6	6^{5}	6^{5}	7^{7}	2
(Ecuador) N Lapentti	4	7^{7}	7^{7}	6^{5}	6
(Netherlands) R Sluiter	6	7^{8}	2
16	(Finland) J Nieminen	2	6^{6}	1^{r}

Second round
3	(Argentina) D Nalbandian	6	3	7	6
(France) R Gasquet	2	6	5	0
(United Kingdom) T Henman	3	2	6	4
31	(Russia) D Tursunov	6	6	4	6
21	(France) S Grosjean	6	4	6	5	2
Q	(Argentina) M Vassallo Argüello	1	6	4	7	6
(Ecuador) N Lapentti	1	4	1
(Netherlands) R Sluiter	6	6	6

Third round
3	(Argentina) D Nalbandian	2	5	6	6	6
31	(Russia) D Tursunov	6	7	4	2	4
Q	(Argentina) M Vassallo Argüello	2	6	6	3	6
(Netherlands) R Sluiter	6	4	3	6	1

Fourth round
3	(Argentina) D Nalbandian	6	6	6
Q	(Argentina) M Vassallo Argüello	4	4	4

==== Section 4 ====
First round
10	(Argentina) G Gaudio	6	6	6
Q	(Croatia) R Karanušić	2	2	2
(Italy) A Seppi	4	6	6	5	1
Q	(Russia) E Korolev	6	2	3	7	6
(Austria) O Marach	3	5	7^{8}	2
(Germany) P Kohlschreiber	6	7	6^{6}	6
Q	(Argentina) JM del Potro	3	6	2	4
24	(Spain) JC Ferrero	6	2	6	6
30	(Spain) C Moyá	7	6	6
(Costa Rica) JA Marín	5	3	3
Q	(Croatia) S Tuksar	3	3	6	0
(Russia) M Youzhny	6	6	3	6
(Brazil) F Saretta	6^{2}	2	6	7^{7}	6
(Italy) P Starace	7^{7}	6	4	6^{1}	3
(United States) V Spadea	5	4	4
6	(Russia) N Davydenko	7	6	6

Second round
10	(Argentina) G Gaudio	6	6^{5}	6	3	6
Q	(Russia) E Korolev	3	7^{7}	4	6	4
(Germany) P Kohlschreiber	2	4	2
24	(Spain) JC Ferrero	6	6	6
30	(Spain) C Moyá	6	6	6
(Russia) M Youzhny	3	4	2
(Brazil) F Saretta	2	1^{r}
6	(Russia) N Davydenko	6	4

Third round
10	(Argentina) G Gaudio	7	7	7^{9}
24	(Spain) JC Ferrero	5	5	6^{7}
30	(Spain) C Moyá	1	5	3
6	(Russia) N Davydenko	6	7	6

Fourth round
10	(Argentina) G Gaudio	3	4	6	3
6	(Russia) N Davydenko	6	6	3	6

=== Bottom half ===
==== Section 5 ====
First round
5	(United States) A Roddick	4	5	0^{r}
(Spain) A Martín	6	7	1
Q	(Germany) D Kindlmann	6	6	6
(Romania) R Sabău	3	2	2
(France) N Mahut	3	6^{3}	7^{7}	6^{3}
(Czech Republic) J Vaněk	6	7^{7}	6^{5}	7^{7}
WC	(France) J-C Faurel	1	4	2
27	(Belgium) O Rochus	6	6	6
19	(Cyprus) M Baghdatis	6	6	6^{5}	6
(Spain) A Portas	4	4	7^{7}	1
(Serbia and Montenegro) J Tipsarević	2	4	7^{7}	3
(France) J Benneteau	6	6	6^{5}	6
(Italy) D Bracciali	6	6^{10}	3	3
(Italy) D Sanguinetti	3	7^{12}	6	6
WC	(France) M Llodra	4	4	2
11	(Czech Republic) R Štěpánek	6	6	6

Second round
(Spain) A Martín	6	6	6
Q	(Germany) D Kindlmann	3	3	3
(Czech Republic) J Vaněk	2	0	2
27	(Belgium) O Rochus	6	6	6
19	(Cyprus) M Baghdatis	6	4	3	7^{7}	4
(France) J Benneteau	3	6	6	6^{1}	6
(Italy) D Sanguinetti	3	3	1
11	(Czech Republic) R Štěpánek	6	6	6

Third round
(Spain) A Martín	7	4	6^{5}	6	6
27	(Belgium) O Rochus	5	6	7^{7}	1	4
(France) J Benneteau	5	7	7^{10}	6
11	(Czech Republic) R Štěpánek	7	5	6^{8}	3

Fourth round
(Spain) A Martín	1^{r}
(France) J Benneteau	5

==== Section 6 ====
First round
15	(Spain) D Ferrer	7	6	6
(Spain) G García López	5	1	0
(Sweden) J Björkman	2	5	2
WC	(France) J Chardy	6	7	6
WC	(France) T Ascione	6^{7}	4	7^{8}	3
(Spain) R Ramírez Hidalgo	7^{9}	6	6^{6}	6
(Belgium) C Rochus	3	5	6	6	6
18	(Sweden) T Johansson	6	7	4	4	2
28	(Spain) F Verdasco	6	6	6^{6}	6
(Argentina) JI Chela	1	3	7^{8}	4
(Argentina) J Mónaco	6	6	6
LL	(Netherlands) M van Gemerden	3	2	4
Q	(Spain) Ó Hernández	6	6	6
(France) G Simon	4	2	3
(Argentina) C Berlocq	2	0	3
4	(Croatia) I Ljubičić	6	6	6

Second round
15	(Spain) D Ferrer	6	6	3	6
WC	(France) J Chardy	1	4	6	1
(Spain) R Ramírez Hidalgo	5
(Belgium) C Rochus	2^{r}
28	(Spain) F Verdasco	6	4	4	1
(Argentina) J Mónaco	4	6	6	6
Q	(Spain) Ó Hernández	3	7^{9}	1	2
4	(Croatia) I Ljubičić	6	6^{7}	6	6

Third round
15	(Spain) D Ferrer	6^{4}	5	4
(Spain) R Ramírez Hidalgo	7^{7}	7	6
(Argentina) J Mónaco	6	7	3	4	2
4	(Croatia) I Ljubičić	4	5	6	6	6

Fourth round
(Spain) R Ramírez Hidalgo	3	6	3	2
4	(Croatia) I Ljubičić	6	3	6	6

==== Section 7 ====
First round
8	(United States) J Blake	6	6	7^{7}
(Thailand) P Srichaphan	0	4	6^{3}
(Spain) N Almagro	7	6	6
Q	(Australia) W Arthurs	5	2	2
Q	(Argentina) E Massa	1	3	3
Q	(Belgium) D Norman	6	6	6
(United Kingdom) A Murray	4	7^{7}	6	2	1
25	(France) G Monfils	6	6^{2}	1	6	6
23	(Germany) T Haas	6	6	6
(Germany) R Schüttler	4	3	3
(Germany) A Waske	6	4	7^{8}	7^{7}
(Spain) F Vicente	4	6	6^{6}	6^{4}
(Serbia and Montenegro) N Djokovic	6	5
(Peru) L Horna	3	0^{r}
(Russia) M Safin	3	6	3	1
9	(Chile) F González	6	1	6	6

Second round
8	(United States) J Blake	6^{5}	6	6	6
(Spain) N Almagro	7^{7}	2	4	4
Q	(Belgium) D Norman	6	3	7^{7}	0	5
25	(France) G Monfils	4	6	6^{4}	6	7
23	(Germany) T Haas	6	7	6^{6}	6
(Germany) A Waske	4	5	7^{8}	4
(Serbia and Montenegro) N Djokovic	6	6	3	4	6
9	(Chile) F González	4	1	6	6	1

Third round
8	(United States) J Blake	2	7^{7}	6^{1}	7	4
25	(France) G Monfils	6	6^{2}	7^{7}	5	6
23	(Germany) T Haas	5	1	6^{4}
(Serbia and Montenegro) N Djokovic	7	6	7^{7}

Fourth round
25	(France) G Monfils	6^{5}	6^{5}	3
(Serbia and Montenegro) N Djokovic	7^{7}	7^{7}	6

==== Section 8 ====
First round
14	(Australia) L Hewitt	7^{7}	3	6	6
(Czech Republic) J Hernych	6^{5}	6	2	0
WC	(France) M Montcourt	6	6	1	6
(Brazil) M Daniel	2	4	6	2
(Croatia) I Karlović	7^{8}	7^{7}	7^{12}
WC	(France) O Patience	6^{6}	6^{1}	6^{10}
Q	(Argentina) S Roitman	4	2	6	6	3
22	(Slovakia) D Hrbatý	6	6	3	2	6
29	(France) P-H Mathieu	6	6	6
(Germany) B Phau	4	2	1
(Czech Republic) R Vik	1	6	5	4
(France) F Serra	6	1	7	6
LL	(United States) K Kim	7	6	6^{4}	7^{7}
Q	(Brazil) J Silva	5	2	7^{7}	6^{3}
(Sweden) R Söderling	2	5	1
2	(Spain) R Nadal	6	7	6

Second round
14	(Australia) L Hewitt	7	6	6
WC	(France) M Montcourt	5	3	3
(Croatia) I Karlović	6	4	7^{7}	5	2
22	(Slovakia) D Hrbatý	4	6	6^{2}	7	6
29	(France) P-H Mathieu	6	7^{7}	7^{8}
(France) F Serra	0	6^{5}	6^{6}
LL	(United States) K Kim	2	1	4
2	(Spain) R Nadal	6	6	6

Third round
14	(Australia) L Hewitt	7^{7}	6	6
22	(Slovakia) D Hrbatý	6^{5}	2	2
29	(France) P-H Mathieu	7	4	4	4
2	(Spain) R Nadal	5	6	6	6

Fourth round
14	(Australia) L Hewitt	2	7	4	2
2	(Spain) R Nadal	6	5	6	6

Preceded by 2006 Australian Open – Men's singles	Grand Slam men's singles	Succeeded by 2006 Wimbledon Championships – Men's singles
