= 2003 Pacific Life Open – Men's singles =

Men's singles
- 2003 Pacific Life Open

Final
- Champion: (Australia) Lleyton Hewitt
- Runner-up: (Brazil) Gustavo Kuerten
- Score: 6–1, 6–1

Details
- Draw: 64 (4WC/8Q/1LL)
- Seeds: 16

Events
Singles	men	women
Doubles	men	women
← 2002 ·	Indian Wells Open	· 2004 →

Defending champion Lleyton Hewitt defeated Gustavo Kuerten in the final, 6–1, 6–1 to win the men's singles tennis title at the 2003 Indian Wells Masters. He saved three match points en route to the title, in the first round against Younes El Aynaoui.

== Seeds ==
1. (Australia) Lleyton Hewitt (champion)
2. (United States) ~~Andre Agassi~~ (withdrew due to a shoulder injury)
3. (Spain) Juan Carlos Ferrero (second round)
4. (Switzerland) Roger Federer (second round)
5. (Spain) Carlos Moyá (third round)
6. (United States) Andy Roddick (quarterfinals)
7. (Russia) Marat Safin (third round)
8. (Spain) Albert Costa (second round)
9. (Czech Republic) Jiří Novák (second round, withdrew due to a virus)
10. (Argentina) David Nalbandian (first round)
11. (France) Sébastien Grosjean (third round)
12. (Thailand) Paradorn Srichaphan (first round)
13. (United Kingdom) Tim Henman (second round)
14. (Netherlands) Sjeng Schalken (second round)
15. (Germany) Rainer Schüttler (semifinals)
16. (Spain) Àlex Corretja (second round)
17. (Argentina) Gastón Gaudio (first round, retired due to a virus)

== Draw ==
=== Key ===
- Q = Qualifier
- WC = Wild card
- LL = Lucky loser
- Alt = Alternate
- ITF = ITF entry
- PR = Protected ranking
- SR = Special ranking
- SE = Special exempt
- JE = Junior exempt
- JR = Junior Accelerator Programme entrant
- CO = College Accelerator Programme entrant
- NG = Next Gen Accelerator Program entrant
- w/o = Walkover
- r = Retired
- d = Defaulted

=== Finals ===
Quarterfinals
1	(Australia) Lleyton Hewitt	6	6
Q	(United States) Robby Ginepri	4	2
Q	(United States) Brian Vahaly	3	2
Q	(United States) Vince Spadea	6	6
(United States) James Blake	6	4	0
(Brazil) Gustavo Kuerten	4	6	6
6	(United States) Andy Roddick	3	2
15	(Germany) Rainer Schüttler	6	6

Semifinals
1	(Australia) Lleyton Hewitt	7^{7}	6
Q	(United States) Vince Spadea	6^{5}	1
(Brazil) Gustavo Kuerten	6	3	6
15	(Germany) Rainer Schüttler	2	6	2

Final
1	(Australia) Lleyton Hewitt	6	6
(Brazil) Gustavo Kuerten	1	1

=== Top half ===
==== Section 1 ====
First round
1	(Australia) L Hewitt	4	7	6
(Morocco) Y El Aynaoui	6	5	2
(Russia) Y Kafelnikov	4	6	6
(Czech Republic) R Štěpánek	6	1	1
(Argentina) G Coria	6	2	6
(Italy) D Sanguinetti	0	6	0
(Argentina) J Acasuso	6^{2}	6^{7}
16	(Spain) À Corretja	7^{7}	7^{9}
9	(Czech Republic) J Novák	6	7
Q	(Slovakia) K Beck	4	5
Q	(United States) R Ginepri	7^{7}	4	6
Q	(South Korea) H-T Lee	6^{2}	6	4
(Romania) A Pavel	3	4
WC	(Australia) M Philippoussis	6	6
(Austria) S Koubek	6	3	5
7	(Russia) M Safin	3	6	7

Second round
1	(Australia) L Hewitt	6	6
(Russia) Y Kafelnikov	3	2
(Argentina) G Coria	6	6
16	(Spain) À Corretja	2	1
9	(Czech Republic) J Novák
Q	(United States) R Ginepri	w/o
WC	(Australia) M Philippoussis	4	3
7	(Russia) M Safin	6	6

Third round
1	(Australia) L Hewitt	6^{3}	6	6
(Argentina) G Coria	7^{7}	4	3
Q	(United States) R Ginepri	6	6
7	(Russia) M Safin	0	1

Quarterfinals
1	(Australia) L Hewitt	6	6
Q	(United States) R Ginepri	4	2

==== Section 2 ====
First round
3	(Spain) J C Ferrero	6	6^{5}	6
Q	(Armenia) S Sargsian	4	7^{7}	4
(Chile) F González	6	3	4
Q	(United States) B Vahaly	2	6	6
(Finland) J Nieminen	2	1^{r}
(Spain) T Robredo	6	0
(Spain) F Vicente	2	3
14	(Netherlands) S Schalken	6	6
12	(Thailand) P Srichaphan	3	4
Q	(United States) V Spadea	6	6
Q	(Germany) N Kiefer	6	6
WC	(Croatia) M Ančić	2	4
LL	(Belgium) O Rochus	6	2	6
(France) F Santoro	1	6	3
(Netherlands) R Krajicek	6^{5}	6^{4}
8	(Spain) A Costa	7^{7}	7^{7}

Second round
3	(Spain) J C Ferrero	4	6	3
Q	(United States) B Vahaly	6	3	6
(Spain) T Robredo	5	6	6
14	(Netherlands) S Schalken	7	2	0
Q	(United States) V Spadea	6	6
Q	(Germany) N Kiefer	3	2
LL	(Belgium) O Rochus	5	6	6
8	(Spain) A Costa	7	4	4

Third round
Q	(United States) B Vahaly	6	7
(Spain) T Robredo	2	5
Q	(United States) V Spadea	6	4	6
LL	(Belgium) O Rochus	4	6	2

Quarterfinals
Q	(United States) B Vahaly	3	2
Q	(United States) V Spadea	6	6

=== Bottom half ===
==== Section 3 ====
First round
8	(Spain) C Moyá	6	6
WC	(United States) M Chang	0	3
Q	(Switzerland) M Kratochvil	2	6	2
(France) A Clément	6	3	6
(United States) J Blake	6	3	7
WC	(United States) T Martin	1	6	5
(Argentina) J I Chela	4	6	7
10	(Argentina) D Nalbandian	6	4	5
13	(United Kingdom) T Henman	7	6
(United States) J-M Gambill	5	2
(Ecuador) N Lapentti	4	3
(Argentina) A Calleri	6	6
(Brazil) G Kuerten	6	6
(Croatia) G Ivanišević	2	4
(Spain) F Mantilla	7^{7}	4	1^{r}
4	(Switzerland) R Federer	6^{4}	6	4

Second round
8	(Spain) C Moyá	6	6
(France) A Clément	0	2
(United States) J Blake	6	6
(Argentina) J I Chela	1	4
13	(United Kingdom) T Henman	4	6^{4}
(Argentina) A Calleri	6	7^{7}
(Brazil) G Kuerten	7	7^{7}
4	(Switzerland) R Federer	5	6^{3}

Third round
8	(Spain) C Moyá	7	3	2
(United States) J Blake	5	6	6
(Argentina) A Calleri	4	6^{5}
(Brazil) G Kuerten	6	7^{7}

Quarterfinals
(United States) J Blake	6	4	0
(Brazil) G Kuerten	4	6	6

==== Section 4 ====
First round
6	(United States) A Roddick	6	6
(Sweden) T Enqvist	4	4
(Slovakia) D Hrbatý	2	6^{2}
(Spain) F López	6	7^{7}
(Spain) D Ferrer	1	0
(Belgium) X Malisse	6	6
(Spain) D Sánchez	3	2
11	(France) S Grosjean	6	6
15	(Germany) R Schüttler	6	7^{7}
(Australia) W Arthurs	4	6^{3}
(Argentina) M Zabaleta	7^{7}	6
(Russia) M Youzhny	6^{5}	1
(South Africa) W Ferreira	6^{5}	3
(Belarus) M Mirnyi	7^{7}	6
(Chile) M Ríos	4
17	(Argentina) G Gaudio	0^{r}

Second round
6	(United States) A Roddick	6	6
(Spain) F López	4	3
(Belgium) X Malisse	3	3
11	(France) S Grosjean	6	6
15	(Germany) R Schüttler	6	6
(Argentina) M Zabaleta	3	3
(Belarus) M Mirnyi	6	6
(Chile) M Ríos	3	3

Third round
6	(United States) A Roddick	7^{7}	2	7^{7}
11	(France) S Grosjean	6^{5}	6	6^{1}
15	(Germany) R Schüttler	6	6
(Belarus) M Mirnyi	3	4

Quarterfinals
6	(United States) A Roddick	3	2
15	(Germany) R Schüttler	6	6

== Qualifying ==
=== Qualifying seeds ===
1. (United States) Vince Spadea (qualified)
2. (South Korea) Lee Hyung-taik (qualified)
3. (Belgium) Olivier Rochus (qualifying competition, lucky loser)
4. (Brazil) André Sá (first round)
5. (Switzerland) Michel Kratochvil (qualified)
6. (Slovakia) Karol Beck (qualified)
7. (Germany) Nicolas Kiefer (qualified)
8. (United States) Robby Ginepri (qualified)
9. (United States) Brian Vahaly (qualified)
10. (Armenia) Sargis Sargsian (qualified)
11. (Peru) Luis Horna (qualifying competition)
12. (Argentina) Franco Squillari (qualifying competition)
13. (France) Jean-René Lisnard (qualifiying competition)
14. (United States) Justin Gimelstob (first round)
15. (Sweden) Magnus Norman (qualifying competition)
16. (Denmark) Kristian Pless (qualifying competition)

=== Qualifiers ===
1. (United States) Vince Spadea
2. (South Korea) Lee Hyung-taik
3. (United States) Brian Vahaly
4. (Armenia) Sargis Sargsian
5. (Switzerland) Michel Kratochvil
6. (Slovakia) Karol Beck
7. (Germany) Nicolas Kiefer
8. (United States) Robby Ginepri

=== Lucky loser ===
1. (Belgium) Olivier Rochus

=== Qualifying draw ===
==== First qualifier ====
First round
1	(United States) Vince Spadea	6	3	6
(United States) Michael Joyce	1	6	1
WC	(United States) Brian Baker	3	3
15	(Sweden) Magnus Norman	6	6

Qualifying competition
1	(United States) Vince Spadea	7^{7}	6
15	(Sweden) Magnus Norman	6^{5}	4

==== Second qualifier ====
First round
2	(South Korea) Lee Hyung-taik	6	6
(Australia) Peter Luczak	4	0
(Germany) Alexander Waske	6^{2}	7^{7}	4
13	(France) Jean-René Lisnard	7^{7}	6^{3}	6

Qualifying competition
2	(South Korea) Lee Hyung-taik	6	6
13	(France) Jean-René Lisnard	3	4

==== Third qualifier ====
First round
3	(Belgium) Olivier Rochus	6	6
(Brazil) Fernando Meligeni	3	1
WC	(United States) Alex Reichel	2	4
9	(United States) Brian Vahaly	6	6

Qualifying competition
3	(Belgium) Olivier Rochus	4	2
9	(United States) Brian Vahaly	6	6

==== Fourth qualifier ====
First round
4	(Brazil) André Sá	1	2
(Chile) Nicolás Massú	6	6
(Australia) Scott Draper	5	5
10	(Armenia) Sargis Sargsian	7	7

Qualifying competition
(Chile) Nicolás Massú	7	6^{5}	1
10	(Armenia) Sargis Sargsian	5	7^{7}	6

==== Fifth qualifier ====
First round
5	(Switzerland) Michel Kratochvil	6	6^{5}	7^{7}
(Philippines) Cecil Mamiit	4	7^{7}	6^{3}
(Argentina) Gastón Etlis	7	6
14	(United States) Justin Gimelstob	5	3

Qualifying competition
5	(Switzerland) Michel Kratochvil	7	6
(Argentina) Gastón Etlis	5	2

==== Sixth qualifier ====
First round
6	(Slovakia) Karol Beck	6	6
(France) Arnaud Di Pasquale	4	4
(Hungary) Attila Sávolt	6	3	3
11	(Peru) Luis Horna	2	6	6

Qualifying competition
6	(Slovakia) Karol Beck	6	6
11	(Peru) Luis Horna	3	2

==== Seventh qualifier ====
First round
7	(Germany) Nicolas Kiefer	6	6
(France) Michaël Llodra	4	3
(Austria) Jürgen Melzer	6^{3}	4
16	(Denmark) Kristian Pless	7^{7}	6

Qualifying competition
7	(Germany) Nicolas Kiefer	6	6
16	(Denmark) Kristian Pless	4	2

==== Eighth qualifier ====
First round
8	(United States) Robby Ginepri	6	6
WC	(India) Prakash Amritraj	3	3
WC	(United States) Brendan Evans	6	1	5
12	(Argentina) Franco Squillari	4	6	7

Qualifying competition
8	(United States) Robby Ginepri	7	6
12	(Argentina) Franco Squillari	5	0
