= 2006 US Open – Men's singles =

Men's singles
- 2006 US Open

Final
- Champion: (Switzerland) Roger Federer
- Runner-up: (United States) Andy Roddick
- Score: 6–2, 4–6, 7–5, 6–1

Details
- Draw: 128
- Seeds: 32

Events
Singles	men	women		boys	girls
Doubles	men	women	mixed	boys	girls
WC Singles	men	women	quad
WC Doubles	men	women	quad
Legends	men	women	mixed
- US Open

Two-time defending champion Roger Federer defeated Andy Roddick in the final, 6–2, 4–6, 7–5, 6–1 to win the men's singles tennis title at the 2006 US Open. It was his third US Open title and ninth major title overall. Federer became the sixth man (after Jack Crawford, Don Budge, Frank Sedgman, Lew Hoad and Rod Laver) to reach all four major finals in one calendar year, and the first to do so since Laver in 1969. Also, he reached a record-equaling tenth consecutive major semifinal (streak starting at the 2004 Wimbledon Championships), matching Laver and Ivan Lendl.

This marked the first time Novak Djokovic and Andy Murray were seeded at a major.

This tournament marked the final professional appearance of eight-time major champion, Olympic gold medalist and former world No. 1 Andre Agassi; he was defeated by Benjamin Becker in the third round. Future champion Juan Martín del Potro made his first US Open appearance, losing to Alejandro Falla in the first round.

== Seeds ==
The seeded players are listed below. Players are listed with the round in which they exited.

1. (Switzerland) Roger Federer (champion)
2. (Spain) Rafael Nadal (quarterfinals)
3. (Croatia) Ivan Ljubičić (first round)
4. (Argentina) David Nalbandian (second round)
5. (United States) James Blake (quarterfinals)
6. (Spain) Tommy Robredo (fourth round)
7. (Russia) Nikolay Davydenko (semifinals)
8. (Cyprus) Marcos Baghdatis (second round)
9. (United States) Andy Roddick (final)
10. (Chile) Fernando González (third round)
11. (Spain) David Ferrer (third round)
12. (Czech Republic) Tomáš Berdych (fourth round)
13. (Finland) Jarkko Nieminen (first round)
14. (Germany) Tommy Haas (quarterfinals)
15. (Australia) Lleyton Hewitt (quarterfinals)
16. (Spain) Juan Carlos Ferrero (second round)

17. (United Kingdom) Andy Murray (fourth round)
18. (United States) Robby Ginepri (third round)
19. (Slovakia) Dominik Hrbatý (first round)
20. (Serbia) Novak Djokovic (third round)
21. (Argentina) Gastón Gaudio (third round)
22. (Spain) Fernando Verdasco (third round)
23. (Russia) Dmitry Tursunov (third round)
24. (Argentina) José Acasuso (first round)
25. (France) Richard Gasquet (fourth round)
26. (Belgium) Olivier Rochus (third round)
27. (France) Gaël Monfils (second round)
28. (Argentina) Agustín Calleri (first round)
29. (Sweden) Jonas Björkman (second round)
30. (France) Sébastien Grosjean (second round)
31. (Argentina) Juan Ignacio Chela (first round)
32. (Belgium) Kristof Vliegen (first round)

Click on the seed number of a player to go to their draw section.

== Draw ==
Key

- Q = Qualifier
- WC = Wild card
- LL = Lucky loser
- Alt = Alternate
- ITF = ITF entry
- PR = Protected ranking
- SR = Special ranking
- SE = Special exempt
- JE = Junior exempt
- JR = Junior Accelerator Programme entrant
- CO = College Accelerator Programme entrant
- NG = Next Gen Accelerator Program entrant
- w/o = Walkover
- r = Retired
- d = Defaulted

=== Finals ===
Quarterfinals
1	(Switzerland) Roger Federer	7^{9}	6	6^{9}	6
5	(United States) James Blake	6^{7}	0	7^{11}	4
14	(Germany) Tommy Haas	6	7^{7}	3	4	4
7	(Russia) Nikolay Davydenko	4	6^{3}	6	6	6
9	(United States) Andy Roddick	6	7	6
15	(Australia) Lleyton Hewitt	3	5	4
(Russia) Mikhail Youzhny	6	5	7^{7}	6
2	(Spain) Rafael Nadal	3	7	6^{5}	1

Semifinals
1	(Switzerland) Roger Federer	6	7	6
7	(Russia) Nikolay Davydenko	1	5	4
9	(United States) Andy Roddick	6^{5}	6	7^{7}	6
(Russia) Mikhail Youzhny	7^{7}	0	6^{3}	3

Final
1	(Switzerland) Roger Federer	6	4	7	6
9	(United States) Andy Roddick	2	6	5	1

=== Top half ===
==== Section 1 ====
First round
1	(Switzerland) R Federer	6	6	6
(Chinese Taipei) Y-t Wang	4	1	0
(United Kingdom) T Henman	7^{7}	6	6
(United Kingdom) G Rusedski	6^{4}	2	3
(Luxembourg) G Müller	2	4	3
(United States) V Spadea	6	6	6
WC	(United States) S Jenkins	5	4	4
29	(Sweden) J Björkman	7	6	6
21	(Argentina) G Gaudio	6	6	6
(Italy) A Seppi	4	4	2
WC	(United States) S Querrey	6	6	6
(Germany) P Kohlschreiber	3	4	4
(France) M Gicquel	6	6	6
(Belgium) C Rochus	3	3	4
Q	(Switzerland) G Bastl	5	4	6	3
16	(Spain) JC Ferrero	7	6	3	6

Second round
1	(Switzerland) R Federer	6	6	7
(United Kingdom) T Henman	3	4	5
(United States) V Spadea	6	7^{7}	6
29	(Sweden) J Björkman	4	6^{4}	2
21	(Argentina) G Gaudio	3	6	6	6
WC	(United States) S Querrey	6	2	1	4
(France) M Gicquel	7	6	6
16	(Spain) JC Ferrero	5	3	4

Third round
1	(Switzerland) R Federer	6	6	6
(United States) V Spadea	3	3	0
21	(Argentina) G Gaudio	0	6	6	1	6^{3}
(France) M Gicquel	6	4	4	6	7^{7}

Fourth round
1	(Switzerland) R Federer	6	7^{7}	6
(France) M Gicquel	3	6^{2}	3

==== Section 2 ====
First round
12	(Czech Republic) T Berdych	6	6	6
(Serbia) B Pašanski	4	2	1
(Germany) F Mayer	6	6	6
Q	(Austria) S Koubek	4	1	1
Q	(Argentina) JM del Potro	6^{3}	2	6	5
Q	(Colombia) A Falla	7^{7}	6	4	7
(Russia) I Kunitsyn	2	3	4
23	(Russia) D Tursunov	6	6	6
28	(Argentina) A Calleri	5	6^{5}	7^{7}	3
(Spain) C Moyá	7	7^{7}	6^{3}	6
(France) PH Mathieu	6	6	3	6
Q	(United Kingdom) J Goodall	3	2	6	3
(Russia) T Gabashvili	6	6	3	3	6
(Brazil) M Daniel	3	2	6	6	3
(Argentina) J Mónaco	3	5	6^{7}
5	(United States) J Blake	6	7	7^{9}

Second round
12	(Czech Republic) T Berdych	6	3	6	6
(Germany) F Mayer	1	6	3	3
Q	(Colombia) A Falla	3	6^{4}	5
23	(Russia) D Tursunov	6	7^{7}	7
(Spain) C Moyá	7^{7}	7^{9}	6
(France) PH Mathieu	6^{5}	6^{7}	4
(Russia) T Gabashvili	3	4	6^{5}
5	(United States) J Blake	6	6	7^{7}

Third round
12	(Czech Republic) T Berdych	6^{2}	6	3	6	6
23	(Russia) D Tursunov	7^{7}	3	6	3	4
(Spain) C Moyá	4	6^{6}	6	3
5	(United States) J Blake	6	7^{8}	2	6

Fourth round
12	(Czech Republic) T Berdych	4	3	1
5	(United States) J Blake	6	6	6

==== Section 3 ====
First round
4	(Argentina) D Nalbandian	4	6^{2}	6	7	6
(Germany) M Berrer	6	7^{7}	3	5	2
(Czech Republic) R Vik	1	1	6	3
(Russia) M Safin	6	6	3	6
(Argentina) G Coria	2^{r}
WC	(United States) R Sweeting	3
(France) O Patience	0	2	2
26	(Belgium) O Rochus	6	6	6
18	(United States) R Ginepri	3	6	6	6
(France) J Benneteau	6	4	4	4
(United States) P Goldstein	6	6	2	3	6
Q	(United States) J Witten	3	4	6	6	1
WC	(United States) W Odesnik	4	4	5
(Netherlands) R Sluiter	6	6	7
WC	(United States) A Kuznetsov	2	4	0
14	(Germany) T Haas	6	6	6

Second round
4	(Argentina) D Nalbandian	3	5	6	6	6^{6}
(Russia) M Safin	6	7	2	3	7^{8}
WC	(United States) R Sweeting	2	6	6	4	0
26	(Belgium) O Rochus	6	3	4	6	6
18	(United States) R Ginepri	6	6	6
(United States) P Goldstein	2	2	4
(Netherlands) R Sluiter	4	2	3
14	(Germany) T Haas	6	6	6

Third round
(Russia) M Safin	6	6	6
26	(Belgium) O Rochus	3	2	3
18	(United States) R Ginepri	6^{1}	4	6	6	6^{1}
14	(Germany) T Haas	7^{7}	6	3	3	7^{7}

Fourth round
(Russia) M Safin	6	3	6	2	6^{5}
14	(Germany) T Haas	4	6	2	6	7^{7}

==== Section 4 ====
First round
10	(Chile) F González	6	6	6
Q	(Czech Republic) J Vaněk	2	3	2
(Czech Republic) J Hájek	6	6	6
(Czech Republic) L Dlouhý	3	4	4
(Italy) A di Mauro	5	6	7	7
(Austria) J Melzer	7	1	5	5
Q	(United States) R Kendrick	2	6	3	3
17	(United Kingdom) A Murray	6	1	6	6
32	(Belgium) K Vliegen	6	1	4	6	3
Q	(Poland) Ł Kubot	2	6	6	1	6
(Italy) P Starace	2	0	6	2
Q	(Israel) N Okun	6	6	4	6
(France) N Mahut	6	6^{5}	6	6
(Germany) R Schüttler	4	7^{7}	3	3
(Paraguay) R Delgado	6	4	5	0
7	(Russia) N Davydenko	4	6	7	6

Second round
10	(Chile) F González	6	6	6
(Czech Republic) J Hájek	4	4	2
(Italy) A di Mauro	0	1	1
17	(United Kingdom) A Murray	6	6	6
Q	(Poland) Ł Kubot	7^{9}	6	2	2	6
Q	(Israel) N Okun	6^{7}	4	6	6	4
(France) N Mahut	0	0^{r}
7	(Russia) N Davydenko	6	0

Third round
10	(Chile) F González	3	6	6	3	2
17	(United Kingdom) A Murray	6	3	2	6	6
Q	(Poland) Ł Kubot	4	1	1
7	(Russia) N Davydenko	6	6	6

Fourth round
17	(United Kingdom) A Murray	1	7	3	0
7	(Russia) N Davydenko	6	5	6	6

=== Bottom half ===
==== Section 5 ====
First round
8	(Cyprus) M Baghdatis	7^{7}	7^{9}	6
(Germany) A Waske	6^{1}	6^{7}	3
(Romania) A Pavel	7^{7}	6^{8}	6^{6}	2
(United States) A Agassi	6^{4}	7^{10}	7^{8}	6
Q	(Germany) B Becker	4	7^{7}	6	7^{7}
(Italy) F Volandri	6	6^{3}	4	6^{3}
(Sweden) T Johansson	3	4	7	7^{7}	2
30	(France) S Grosjean	6	6	5	6^{1}	6
22	(Spain) F Verdasco	6	6	3	6
(France) F Santoro	4	1	6	1
PR	(Argentina) M Zabaleta	2	5	7^{7}	3
Q	(Brazil) T Alves	6	7	6^{5}	6
Q	(Denmark) K Pless	3	3	7^{7}	6	6
(Spain) A Martín	6	6	6^{5}	1	2
(France) F Serra	2	1	3
9	(United States) A Roddick	6	6	6

Second round
8	(Cyprus) M Baghdatis	4	4	6	7	5
(United States) A Agassi	6	6	3	5	7
Q	(Germany) B Becker	7^{7}	6	6
30	(France) S Grosjean	6^{3}	1	2
22	(Spain) F Verdasco	7^{7}	6	6
Q	(Brazil) T Alves	6^{3}	4	1
Q	(Denmark) K Pless	3	6^{3}	3
9	(United States) A Roddick	6	7^{7}	6

Third round
(United States) A Agassi	5	7^{7}	4	5
Q	(Germany) B Becker	7	6^{4}	6	7
22	(Spain) F Verdasco	7^{7}	3	4	7^{7}	2
9	(United States) A Roddick	6^{5}	6	6	6^{4}	6

Fourth round
Q	(Germany) B Becker	3	4	3
9	(United States) A Roddick	6	6	6

==== Section 6 ====
First round
15	(Australia) L Hewitt	7	6	6
(Spain) A Montañés	5	4	3
(United States) K Kim	1	4	6	5
(Czech Republic) J Hernych	6	6	3	7
(United States) M Fish	6	6	1	6
(Germany) S Greul	4	4	6	3
WC	(United States) D Young	6	3	0	1
20	(Serbia) N Djokovic	4	6	6	6
25	(France) R Gasquet	6	6	6
WC	(United States) P Simmonds	1	3	1
(France) G Simon	7	6	6
(Italy) D Bracciali	5	4	1
Q	(Switzerland) M Chiudinelli	6	6	6
(Spain) F Vicente	4	1	4
(Spain) F López	6	6	6
3	(Croatia) I Ljubičić	3	3	3

Second round
15	(Australia) L Hewitt	6	6	6
(Czech Republic) J Hernych	4	2	2
(United States) M Fish	6^{5}	4	6	6^{3}
20	(Serbia) N Djokovic	7^{7}	6	3	7^{7}
25	(France) R Gasquet	6	6	6
(France) G Simon	0	2	3
Q	(Switzerland) M Chiudinelli	3	6	4	6	6
(Spain) F López	6	3	6	4	3

Third round
15	(Australia) L Hewitt	6	6	6
20	(Serbia) N Djokovic	3	1	2
25	(France) R Gasquet	7^{7}	6	2	7^{7}
Q	(Switzerland) M Chiudinelli	6^{2}	3	6	6^{2}

Fourth round
15	(Australia) L Hewitt	6	6	4	3	6
25	(France) R Gasquet	4	4	6	6	3

==== Section 7 ====
First round
6	(Spain) T Robredo	6	6	6
(Brazil) F Saretta	2	1	2
(South Korea) H-t Lee	7	6	6
(Spain) R Ramírez Hidalgo	5	4	0
(Croatia) I Karlović	4	6^{3}	5
(Sweden) R Söderling	6	7^{7}	7
(Switzerland) S Wawrinka	6^{3}	6	6	6
31	(Argentina) JI Chela	7^{7}	4	4	4
19	(Slovakia) D Hrbatý	5	1	3
(Russia) M Youzhny	7	6	6
(Chile) N Massú	6^{4}	6	6	6
(Italy) D Sanguinetti	7^{7}	4	4	4
(Austria) O Marach	2	3	5
(United States) J Gimelstob	6	6	7
(Spain) N Almagro	6^{1}	6^{6}	1
11	(Spain) D Ferrer	7^{7}	7^{8}	6

Second round
6	(Spain) T Robredo	3	6	6	6
(South Korea) H-t Lee	6	3	4	1
(Sweden) R Söderling	7^{7}	6	6^{4}	0	1
(Switzerland) S Wawrinka	6^{4}	2	7^{7}	6	6
(Russia) M Youzhny	5	6^{6}	6	6	6
(Chile) N Massú	7	7^{8}	4	3	0
(United States) J Gimelstob	2	4	1
11	(Spain) D Ferrer	6	6	6

Third round
6	(Spain) T Robredo	6	6	6
(Switzerland) S Wawrinka	3	4	2
(Russia) M Youzhny	4	6	7	6
11	(Spain) D Ferrer	6	4	5	4

Fourth round
6	(Spain) T Robredo	2	0	1
(Russia) M Youzhny	6	6	6

==== Section 8 ====
First round
13	(Finland) J Nieminen	4	5	2
(Belgium) X Malisse	6	7	6
(Germany) B Phau	6	7^{7}	6
Q	(United States) J Morrison	3	6^{0}	4
PR	(Czech Republic) J Novák	7	6	7
(France) A Clément	5	2	5
(Thailand) P Srichaphan	6	3	7^{7}	6^{4}	6
24	(Argentina) J Acasuso	3	6	6^{5}	7^{7}	3
27	(France) G Monfils	6	3	7	7^{7}
Q	(United States) M Russell	2	6	5	6^{4}
(Belarus) M Mirnyi	4	6	4	7^{7}	4
(South Africa) W Moodie	6	4	6	6^{5}	6
(Peru) L Horna	7	6	6
(Spain) G García López	5	4	3
WC	(Australia) M Philippoussis	4	4	4
2	(Spain) R Nadal	6	6	6

Second round
(Belgium) X Malisse	6	6	6
(Germany) B Phau	3	0	2
PR	(Czech Republic) J Novák	7^{7}	3	6	6
(Thailand) P Srichaphan	6^{3}	6	4	4
27	(France) G Monfils	4	6	2	6^{4}
(South Africa) W Moodie	6	2	6	7^{7}
(Peru) L Horna	4	6	4	2
2	(Spain) R Nadal	6	4	6	6

Third round
(Belgium) X Malisse	7^{8}	3	4	4
PR	(Czech Republic) J Novák	6^{6}	6	6	6
(South Africa) W Moodie	4	6^{2}	6^{4}
2	(Spain) R Nadal	6	7^{7}	7^{7}

Fourth round
PR	(Czech Republic) J Novák	1	6^{3}	4
2	(Spain) R Nadal	6	7^{7}	6

Preceded by 2006 Wimbledon Championships – Men's singles	Grand Slam men's singles	Succeeded by 2007 Australian Open – Men's singles
