= Luis Horna =

Peruvian tennis player (born 1980)

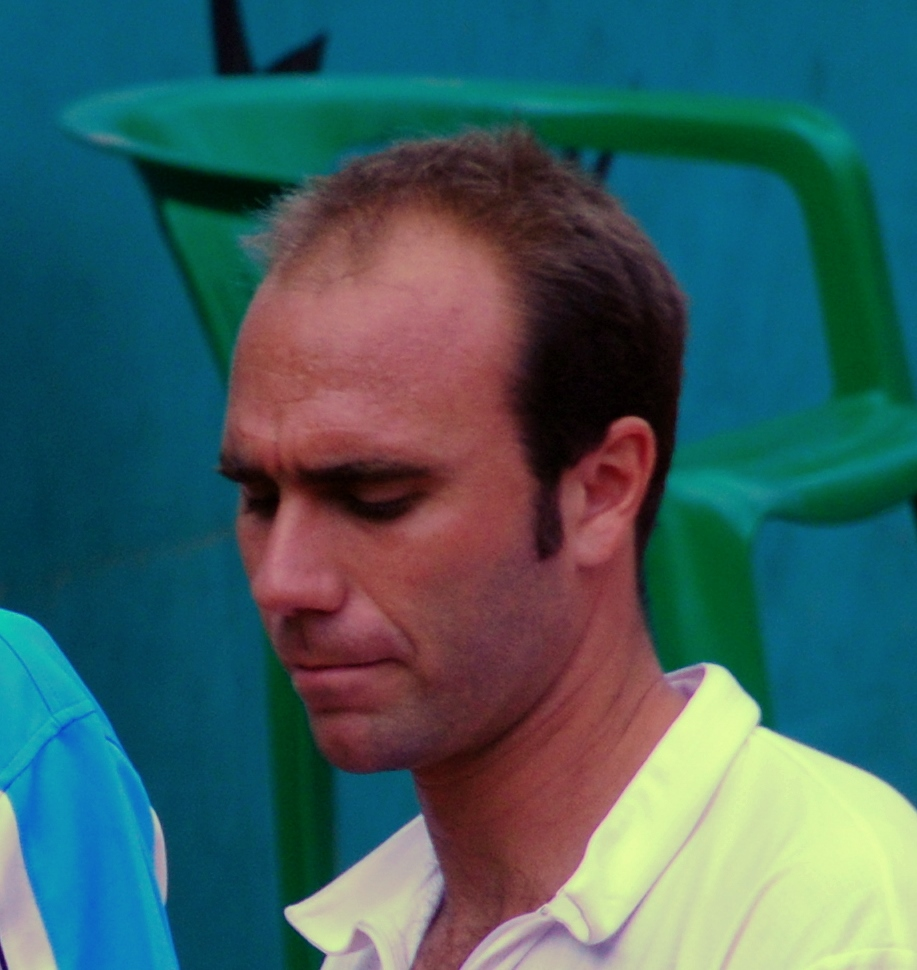
- Country (sports): Peru
- Residence: Lima, Peru
- Born: 14 September 1980 (age 45) Lima, Peru
- Height: 1.80 m (5 ft 11 in)
- Turned pro: 1998
- Retired: 2009
- Plays: Right-handed (one-handed backhand)
- Coach: Francisco Mastelli
- Prize money: $2,648,482

Singles
- Career record: 140–146
- Career titles: 2
- Highest ranking: No. 33 (30 August 2004)

Grand Slam singles results
- Australian Open: 3R (2006)
- French Open: 3R (2005)
- Wimbledon: 1R (2003, 2004, 2005, 2006, 2007, 2008)
- US Open: 2R (2006, 2007)

Other tournaments
- Olympic Games: 1R (2004)

Doubles
- Career record: 76–70
- Career titles: 6
- Highest ranking: No. 15 (2 February 2009)

Grand Slam doubles results
- Australian Open: 1R (2004, 2006, 2007, 2008)
- French Open: W (2008)
- Wimbledon: 2R (2008)
- US Open: 2R (2007, 2008)

Other doubles tournaments
- Tour Finals: SF (2008)
- Last updated on: 8 June 2021.

Luis Horna Biscari (Spanish pronunciation: [ˈlwis ˈoɾna]; born 14 September 1980 in Lima) is a former tour professional tennis player from Peru, who turned professional in 1998. Known by his nickname "Lucho", he won 2 career singles titles, reached the quarterfinals of the 2004 Madrid Masters and achieved a career-high singles ranking of World No. 33 in August 2004.

Together with Pablo Cuevas, Horna also won the men's doubles at the 2008 French Open. At the 2003 French Open, he defeated Roger Federer in the first round.

== Career ==
=== Juniors ===
Horna was an outstanding junior player, reaching as high as No. 4 in the world in singles 1997 (and No. 3 in doubles). He made the final of the boys singles at the French Open in 1997 losing to Daniel Elsner. Horna won the French Open and Wimbledon doubles with José de Armas and Nicolás Massú respectively.

=== 1998–2001 ===
Horna turned professional in 1998 and he moved up over 1,000 places in the rankings with victories in the Ecuadorian, where he defeated Sergio Roitman as a qualifier and three Futures events in Peru and in 1999 made his first ATP Challenger final in Aschaffenburg. In 2000 he was finalist in Salinas and again in Aschaffenburg and it was not until 2001 that Horna was able to get his first win on the ATP tour in Umag defeating Martin Damm. He also made another Challenger final in Curitiba losing to Flávio Saretta.

=== 2002–2004 ===
2002 was a successful year for Horna when he became the first Peruvian since Jaime Yzaga to finish in the top 100 in the end of season rankings, who finished 34th in 1994. This was achieved through winning three Challenger titles in Zagreb, Fürth, and Weiden defeating Dominik Hrbatý, Jürgen Melzer and Zeljko Krajan respectively and finalist in the São Paulo Challenger losing to Franco Squillari.

Horna made his debut in the four Grand Slam events in 2003. At the French Open, Horna defeated Roger Federer who was the fifth pre-tournament favourite and was the last time that Federer lost in the first round of a Grand Slam event. At the time Horna said after the victory that it was "the best feeling I have had in my whole life". Horna lost his second round match after having a match point against eventual finalist Martin Verkerk. He won another Challenger title in Seville and was a three time semi finalist in Amersfoort, Sopot and Palermo.

In 2004, Horna reached his career-high ranking of World No. 33, which was achieved on 30 August. Horna won the Bermuda Challenger over Martín Vassallo Argüello and made his first ATP final in Long Island losing to Lleyton Hewitt. Horna also made three semi finals at the Brasil Open, Houston and Munich. Horna finished inside the top 50 at the end of the year equalling the same feat by Jaime Yzaga.

=== 2005–2006 ===
2005 was not as successful for Horna and his singles ranking slipped to outside the top 50. He won his first doubles title with Argentine Martín García in Amersfoort and achieved his best ever performance at the French Open making the third round and defeating the seeded Tim Henman in the second round before losing to Victor Hănescu.

Despite Horna winning his first ever ATP singles title defeating Juan Ignacio Chela of Argentina 7–6^{(5)}, 6–4 in Acapulco. After winning the title he said "Acapulco will stay in my heart. I've had an unbelievable experience here,". "It's like being at home". As well as reaching the third round of the Australian Open for the first time defeating Gaël Monfils before losing to Paul-Henri Mathieu and winning his second doubles title with Martín García in Palermo. Horna finished 2006 ranked outside the top 50 and had various injury problems relating to his arm and shoulder which affected his final end-of-year ranking.

=== 2007 ===
Horna had an unfortunate start to 2007 by losing his first round match at the Australian Open to doubles' specialist Max Mirnyi, after being frustrated by the umpire's refusal to eject an abusive heckler in the fifth set. His concentration was disturbed by the calls of "Well done, Beast" (Max Mirnyi's nickname) and "C'mon, roadkill". In February of that year he won his second ATP singles title, defeating Nicolás Massú for the only time in 7 matches 7–5, 6–3 in Viña del Mar, Chile, without losing a set in the tournament. In September, Horna and Iván Miranda took the Peruvian team of Davis Cup to the World Group for the first time by beating Belarus in Lima 4–1.

=== 2008 ===
While Horna has only made one semi final in 2008 in Acapulco, he has won 3 doubles titles in Auckland with Juan Mónaco, in Buenos Aires with Agustín Calleri and the 2008 French Open with the Uruguayan Pablo Cuevas. The 2008 Australian Open started an unusual sequence for Horna, in which he played against his sometime doubles partner and friend Agustín Calleri in his first four tournaments of the year in addition to the Australian Open, the others were Viña del Mar, Buenos Aires and Acapulco. This sequence was broken by Horna's elbow injury that caused him to withdraw from Costa do Sauipe.

The highlight of 2008 was the unexpected win in the 2008 French Open men's doubles crown, partnering Uruguayan Pablo Cuevas, the duo became the first all-South American doubles team to win a Grand Slam title in the Open Era. It was a surprise that Cuevas said "We were not expecting to go that far." Horna and Cuevas were unseeded and defeated four seeded teams starting with Michaël Llodra and Arnaud Clément in the first round, Leander Paes and Lukáš Dlouhý in the third round. In the quarter-finals they defeated the No. 1 ranked team Bob and Mike Bryan and in the final defeated the No. 2 seeded team of Nenad Zimonjić and Daniel Nestor. The trophy was presented by Andrés Gómez Horna said that "Gomez has been like an idol for us Peruvians,". "To have a trophy from him is, I think, one of the important moments in my professional career."

While having doubles success, Horna struggled in his singles and finished outside the top 100 since 2001. He won the Lugano Challenger without losing a set defeating Nicolas Devilder in the final.

Horna and Cuevas by virtue of winning Roland Garros had qualified for the Tennis Masters Cup doubles where they made the semi-finals losing to Nenad Zimonjić and Daniel Nestor, by finishing second in their round robin group behind Bob and Mike Bryan.

Horna became the first player from Peru to win a Grand Slam title in the professional era. The Peruvian Alejandro Olmedo won two before the Open era, Wimbledon and Melbourne (Australian Open) in 1959 but representing the United States.

2009 was Horna's last season on tour, and played his final tournament at Lima Challenger, where he lost in the second round to Chilean Jorge Aguilar.

== Playing style ==
Horna plays right-handed, he has a strong serve for a relatively short player and the forehand is his best stroke. He uses a single-handed backhand and his favourite surface is clay.

== Miscellaneous ==
- He previously shared coach Francisco Mastelli with Juan Mónaco and Mastelli was the former coach of current Argentine Davis cup captain Alberto Mancini.
- Horna is currently the Peruvian Davis Cup captain.

== Grand Slam finals ==
=== Doubles: 1 (1–0) ===
Result	Year	Championship	Surface	Partner	Opponents	Score
Win	2008	French Open	Clay	(Uruguay) Pablo Cuevas	(Canada) Daniel Nestor (Serbia) Nenad Zimonjić	6–2, 6–3

== ATP career finals ==
=== Singles: 3 (2 titles, 1 runner-up) ===
Legend Grand Slam tournaments (0–0) Tennis Masters Cup (0–0) ATP Masters Series (0–0) ATP International Series Gold (1–0) ATP International Series (1–1)	Titles by surface Hard (0–1) Clay (2–0) Grass (0–0)	Titles by setting Outdoor (2–1) Indoor (0–0)

Result	W–L	Date	Tournament	Tier	Surface	Opponent	Score
Loss	0–1	Aug 2004	Long Island Open, United States	International	Hard	(Australia) Lleyton Hewitt	3–6, 1–6
Win	1–1	Mar 2006	Mexican Open, Mexico	Intl. Gold	Clay	(Argentina) Juan Ignacio Chela	7–6^{(7–5)}, 6–4
Win	2–1	Feb 2007	Chile Open, Chile	International	Clay	(Chile) Nicolás Massú	7–5, 6–3

=== Doubles: 11 (6 titles, 5 runner-ups) ===
Legend Grand Slam tournaments (1–0) Tennis Masters Cup (0–0) ATP Masters Series (0–0) ATP International Series Gold (1–1) ATP International Series (4–4)	Titles by surface Hard (0–0) Clay (6–5) Grass (0–0)	Titles by setting Outdoor (6–5) Indoor (0–0)

Result	W–L	Date	Tournament	Tier	Surface	Partner	Opponents	Score
Loss	0–1	Jul 2004	Dutch Open, Netherlands	International	Clay	(Argentina) José Acasuso	(Czech Republic) Jaroslav Levinský (Czech Republic) David Škoch	0–6, 6–2, 5–7
Loss	0–2	Apr 2005	Grand Prix Hassan II, Morocco	International	Clay	(Argentina) Martín García	(Czech Republic) František Čermák (Czech Republic) Leoš Friedl	4–6, 3–6
Loss	0–3	Apr 2005	U.S. Men's Clay Court Championships, United States	International	Clay	(Argentina) Martín García	(The Bahamas) Mark Knowles (Canada) Daniel Nestor	3–6, 4–6
Win	1–3	Jul 2005	Dutch Open, Netherlands	International	Clay	(Argentina) Martín García	(Chile) Fernando González (Chile) Nicolás Massú	6–4, 6–4
Loss	1–4	Sep 2006	Romanian Open, Romania	International	Clay	(Argentina) Martín García	(Poland) Mariusz Fyrstenberg (Poland) Marcin Matkowski	7–6^{(7–5)}, 6–7^{(5–7)}, [8–10]
Win	2–4	Oct 2006	Campionati Internazionali di Sicilia, Italy	International	Clay	(Argentina) Martín García	(Poland) Mariusz Fyrstenberg (Poland) Marcin Matkowski	7–6^{(7–1)}, 7–6^{(7–2)}
Win	3–4	Jul 2007	Austrian Open, Austria	Intl. Gold	Clay	(Italy) Potito Starace	(Germany) Tomas Behrend (Germany) Christopher Kas	7–6^{(7–4)}, 7–6^{(7–5)}
Win	4–4	Jan 2008	Auckland Open, New Zealand	International	Clay	(Argentina) Juan Mónaco	(Belgium) Xavier Malisse (Austria) Jürgen Melzer	6–4, 3–6, [10–7]
Win	5–4	Feb 2008	Argentina Open, Argentina	International	Clay	(Argentina) Agustín Calleri	(Austria) Werner Eschauer (Australia) Peter Luczak	6–0, 6–7^{(6–8)}, [10–2]
Loss	5–5	Mar 2008	Mexican Open, Mexico	Intl. Gold	Clay	(Argentina) Agustín Calleri	(Austria) Oliver Marach (Slovakia) Michal Mertiňák	2–6, 7–6^{(7–3)}, [7–10]
Win	6–5	Jun 2008	French Open, France	Grand Slam	Clay	(Uruguay) Pablo Cuevas	(Canada) Daniel Nestor (Serbia) Nenad Zimonjić	6–2, 6–3

== ATP Challenger and ITF Futures Finals ==
=== Singles: 15 (10–5) ===
Legend (singles) ATP Challenger Tour (6–5) ITF Futures (4–0)	Finals by surface Hard (0–1) Clay (10–4) Grass (0–0) Carpet (0–0)

Result	W–L	Date	Tournament	Tier	Surface	Opponent	Score
Win	1–0	Aug 1998	Ecuador F1, Guayaquil	Futures	Clay	(Argentina) Sergio Roitman	6–1, 7–6
Win	2–0	Sep 1998	Peru F1, Lima	Futures	Clay	(Brazil) Marcos Daniel	7–6, 6–4
Win	3–0	Sep 1998	Peru F2, Lima	Futures	Clay	(Argentina) Carlos Gómez-Díaz	7–6, 7–6
Win	4–0	Sep 1998	Peru F3, Lima	Futures	Clay	(Argentina) Carlos Gómez-Díaz	6–2, 7–6
Loss	4–1	Sep 1999	Aschaffenburg, Germany	Challenger	Clay	(Germany) Rene Nicklisch	6–3, 2–6, 6–7
Loss	4–2	Mar 2000	Salinas, Ecuador	Challenger	Hard	(Italy) Davide Sanguinetti	2–6, 2–6
Loss	4–3	Sep 2000	Aschaffenburg, Germany	Challenger	Clay	(France) Nicolas Coutelot	7–6^{(7–2)}, 3–6, 1–6
Loss	4–4	Sep 2001	Curitiba, Brazil	Challenger	Clay	(Brazil) Flávio Saretta	6–7^{(3–7)}, 1–6
Win	5–4	May 2002	Zagreb, Croatia	Challenger	Clay	(Slovakia) Dominik Hrbatý	6–2, 6–1
Win	6–4	Jun 2002	Furth, Germany	Challenger	Clay	(Austria) Jürgen Melzer	6–4, 6–2
Win	7–4	Jun 2002	Weiden, Germany	Challenger	Clay	(Croatia) Zeljko Krajan	6–0, 6–4
Loss	7–5	Nov 2002	São Paulo, Brazil	Challenger	Clay	(Argentina) Franco Squillari	2–6, 4–6
Win	8–5	Oct 2003	Seville, Spain	Challenger	Clay	(Spain) Guillermo García López	6–0, 4–6, 6–3
Win	9–5	Apr 2004	Paget, Bermuda	Challenger	Clay	(Argentina) Martín Vassallo Argüello	6–4, 4–6, 6–4
Win	10–5	Jul 2008	Lugano, Switzerland	Challenger	Clay	(France) Nicolas Devilder	7–6^{(7–1)}, 6–1

=== Doubles: 16 (7–9) ===
Legend (doubles) ATP Challenger Tour (6–8) ITF Futures (1–1)	Finals by surface Hard (1–1) Clay (6–8) Grass (0–0) Carpet (0–0)

Result	W–L	Date	Tournament	Tier	Surface	Partner	Opponents	Score
Win	1–0	Aug 1998	Ecuador F1, Guayaquil	Futures	Clay	(United States) Rudy Rake	(Argentina) Rodrigo Pena (Argentina) Sergio Roitman	6–4, 6–1
Loss	1–1	Sep 1998	Peru F1, Lima	Futures	Clay	(United States) Rudy Rake	(Brazil) Marcos Daniel (Brazil) Rodrigo Monte	7–5, 6–7, 5–7
Win	2–1	Aug 2000	Mönchengladbach, Germany	Challenger	Clay	(Spain) Emilio Benfele Álvarez	(Spain) Germán Puentes Alcañiz (Brazil) Francisco Costa	7–6^{(7–1)}, 1–6, 7–5
Loss	2–2	Oct 2000	Lima, Peru	Challenger	Clay	(Argentina) Juan Ignacio Chela	(Argentina) Gastón Etlis (Argentina) Martín Rodríguez	2–6, 2–5 ret.
Win	3–2	Mar 2001	Salinas, Ecuador	Challenger	Hard	(Argentina) David Nalbandian	(Brazil) Daniel Melo (Brazil) Flávio Saretta	6–4, 0–6, 6–1
Loss	3–3	Jul 2001	Venice, Italy	Challenger	Clay	(Argentina) Sebastián Prieto	(The Bahamas) Mark Merklein (United States) Mitch Sprengelmeyer	4–6, 6–7^{(7–9)}
Loss	3–4	Jan 2002	São Paulo, Brazil	Challenger	Hard	(Argentina) Federico Browne	(Canada) Frédéric Niemeyer (United States) Brandon Coupe	7–6^{(7–5)}, 6–7^{(4–7)}, 4–6
Loss	3–5	May 2002	Ljubljana, Slovenia	Challenger	Clay	(Argentina) Sebastián Prieto	(Argentina) Mariano Hood (Argentina) Edgardo Massa	5–7, 1–6
Win	4–5	Jun 2002	Braunschweig, Germany	Challenger	Clay	(Argentina) Mariano Hood	(Czech Republic) František Čermák (Czech Republic) Petr Luxa	3–6, 6–3, 6–1
Win	5–5	Oct 2002	Seville, Spain	Challenger	Clay	(Argentina) Mariano Hood	(Spain) Álex López Morón (Spain) Albert Portas	4–6, 6–1, 6–4
Loss	5–6	Nov 2002	São Paulo, Brazil	Challenger	Clay	(Argentina) Sergio Roitman	(Argentina) Mariano Hood (Argentina) Sebastián Prieto	3–6, 4–6
Loss	5–7	Nov 2005	Guayaquil, Ecuador	Challenger	Clay	(Peru) Iván Miranda	(Argentina) Juan Martín del Potro (Costa Rica) Juan Antonio Marín	walkover
Win	6–7	Nov 2007	Montevideo, Uruguay	Challenger	Clay	(Uruguay) Pablo Cuevas	(Spain) Santiago Ventura (Spain) Marcel Granollers	walkover
Loss	6–8	Apr 2008	Napoli, Italy	Challenger	Clay	(Portugal) Fred Gil	(Czech Republic) Tomáš Cibulec (Czech Republic) Jaroslav Levinský	1–6, 3–6
Win	7–8	Nov 2008	Lima, Peru	Challenger	Clay	(Argentina) Sebastián Prieto	(Paraguay) Ramón Delgado (Brazil) Júlio Silva	6–3, 6–3
Loss	7–9	Mar 2009	Barletta, Italy	Challenger	Clay	(Uruguay) Pablo Cuevas	(Spain) Santiago Ventura (Spain) Rubén Ramírez Hidalgo	6–7^{(1–7)}, 2–6

== Performance timelines ==
Key
W	F	SF	QF	#R	RR	Q#	DNQ	A	NH

(W) winner; (F) finalist; (SF) semifinalist; (QF) quarterfinalist; (#R) rounds 4, 3, 2, 1; (RR) round-robin stage; (Q#) qualification round; (DNQ) did not qualify; (A) absent; (NH) not held; (SR) strike rate (events won / competed); (W–L) win–loss record.

=== Singles ===
Tournament	2000	2001	2002	2003	2004	2005	2006	2007	2008	2009	SR	W–L	Win %
Grand Slam tournaments
Australian Open	A	A	Q2	1R	1R	1R	3R	1R	1R	A	0 / 6	2–6	25%
French Open	Q3	Q1	Q1	2R	2R	3R	1R	1R	2R	Q2	0 / 6	5–6	45%
Wimbledon	A	A	A	1R	1R	1R	1R	1R	1R	A	0 / 6	0–6	0%
US Open	A	A	1R	1R	1R	1R	2R	2R	1R	A	0 / 7	2–7	22%
Win–loss	0–0	0–0	0–1	1–4	1–4	2–4	3–4	1–4	1–4	0–0	0 / 25	9–25	26%
ATP Tour Masters 1000
Indian Wells Masters	A	A	A	Q2	3R	1R	1R	2R	1R	A	0 / 5	3–5	38%
Miami Open	A	Q2	3R	2R	1R	1R	2R	2R	A	A	0 / 6	5–6	45%
Monte-Carlo Masters	A	A	A	2R	A	1R	1R	A	A	A	0 / 3	1–3	25%
Hamburg Masters	A	A	A	Q1	2R	1R	1R	Q2	1R	A	0 / 4	1–4	20%
Italian Open	A	A	A	A	3R	3R	1R	Q1	3R	A	0 / 4	6–4	60%
Canada Masters	A	A	A	A	3R	1R	A	A	A	A	0 / 2	2–2	50%
Cincinnati Masters	A	A	A	A	2R	3R	A	A	A	A	0 / 2	3–2	60%
Madrid Open	Not Held		A	A	QF	A	A	A	A	A	0 / 1	3–1	75%
Paris Masters	A	A	A	A	1R	A	A	A	A	A	0 / 1	0–1	0%
Win–loss	0–0	0–0	2–1	2–2	11–8	4–7	1–5	2–2	2–3	0–0	0 / 28	24–28	46%
Year End Ranking	127	138	77	64	36	84	61	73	106	440			

=== Doubles ===
Tournament	2003	2004	2005	2006	2007	2008	2009	SR	W–L	Win %
Grand Slam tournaments
Australian Open	A	1R	A	1R	1R	1R	A	0 / 4	0–4	0%
French Open	1R	1R	A	A	1R	W	3R	1 / 5	8–4	67%
Wimbledon	A	1R	1R	A	A	2R	A	0 / 3	1–3	25%
US Open	1R	1R	1R	1R	2R	2R	A	0 / 6	2–6	25%
Win–loss	0–2	0–4	0–2	0–2	1–3	8–3	2–1	1 / 18	11–17	39%
Year End Ranking	404	121	93	76	107	17	275			

== Top 10 wins ==
Season	1998	1999	2000	2001	2002	2003	2004	2005	2006	2007	2008	2009	Total
Wins	0	0	0	0	0	2	1	2	1	3	1	0	10

#	Player	Rank	Event	Surface	Rd	Score	Horna Rank
2003
1.	(Switzerland) Roger Federer	5	French Open, France	Clay	1R	7–6^{(8–6)}, 6–2, 7-6^{(7–3)}	88
2.	(Spain) Juan Carlos Ferrero	2	Sopot, Poland	Clay	QF	6-1, 7-6^{(7–1)}	92
2004
3.	(Argentina) Guillermo Coria	3	Toronto, Canada	Hard	1R	5-1, ret.	41
2005
4.	(United Kingdom) Tim Henman	8	French Open, France	Clay	2R	7–5, 6–7^{(2–7)}, 6–3, 6–4	59
5.	(Argentina) Guillermo Coria	10	Cincinnati, United States	Hard	2R	6-4, 6-4	63
2006
6.	(Argentina) Gastón Gaudio	8	Acapulco, Mexico	Clay	SF	4–6, 6–4, 6–3	68
2007
7.	(Argentina) David Nalbandian	8	Buenos Aires, Argentina	Clay	1R	6-4, 6-3	50
8.	(Croatia) Ivan Ljubičić	7	Pörtschach, Austria	Clay	2R	7-6^{(7–5)}, 6-4	82
9.	(Spain) Tommy Robredo	8	Båstad, Sweden	Clay	1R	6–1, 1–6, 6–1	82
2008
10.	(France) Richard Gasquet	9	Rome, Italy	Clay	1R	6-4, 6-1	111

== Junior Grand Slam finals ==
=== Singles: 1 (1 runner-up) ===
Result	Year	Tournament	Surface	Opponent	Score
Loss	1997	French Open	Clay	(Germany) Daniel Elsner	4–6, 4–6

=== Doubles: 2 (2 titles) ===
Result	Year	Tournament	Surface	Partner	Opponents	Score
Win	1997	French Open	Clay	(Venezuela) José de Armas	(France) Arnaud Di Pasquale (France) Julien Jeanpierre	6–4, 2–6, 7–5
Win	1997	Wimbledon	Grass	(Chile) Nicolás Massú	(South Africa) Jaco Van Der Westhuizen (South Africa) Wesley Whitehouse	6–4, 6–2
