= Agustín Calleri =

Argentine tennis player

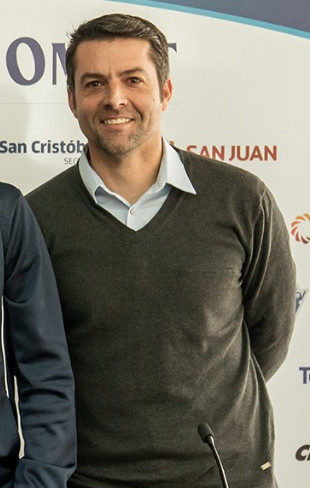
- Country (sports): Argentina
- Born: 14 September 1976 (age 49) Río Cuarto, Córdoba, Argentina
- Height: 1.83 m (6 ft 0 in)
- Turned pro: 1995
- Retired: 2010
- Plays: Right-handed (one-handed backhand)
- Prize money: $3,753,387

Singles
- Career record: 209–187
- Career titles: 2
- Highest ranking: No. 16 (7 July 2003)

Grand Slam singles results
- Australian Open: 2R (2001, 2004, 2005, 2008)
- French Open: 3R (2000)
- Wimbledon: 2R (2003, 2006, 2007, 2008)
- US Open: 3R (2000, 2007)

Other tournaments
- Olympic Games: 2R (2004, 2008)

Doubles
- Career record: 82–86
- Career titles: 3
- Highest ranking: No. 52 (16 June 2008)

Grand Slam doubles results
- Australian Open: 2R (2008)
- French Open: 1R (2008)
- Wimbledon: 1R (2003, 2007)
- US Open: 2R (2007, 2008)

Other doubles tournaments
- Olympic Games: 1R (2008)
- Last updated on: 29 November 2022.

Agustín Calleri (Spanish pronunciation: [aɣusˈtiŋ kaˈleɾi], (Note: In isolation, Agustín is pronounced [aɣusˈtin].) Italian: [kalˈlɛːri, ˈkalleri]; born 14 September 1976) is a retired professional male tennis player from Argentina. His nickname is Gordo which means Fat in Spanish. He is known as a hard-hitter and he prefers playing on clay.

Calleri served as a member of the Argentine Chamber of Deputies from 2016 to 2017, as part of the United for a New Alternative alliance.

== Career ==
Born in Río Cuarto, Córdoba, Argentina, he picked up first ATP win in 1999 over Jan Vacek at Roland Garros. Also advanced to first quarter-final at Umag. In 2000 he made the third round in Roland Garros, before losing to Andrei Medvedev. He beat Marat Safin in Kitzbühel and pushed Pete Sampras to two tie-breakers in US Open's third round. Then in 2001 he won three challenger events beating Juan Ignacio Chela and David Nalbandian.

He finished in Top 50 for his first time in 2002, and had match points to Nicolás Massú in Buenos Aires final. Later in October he beat Marat Safin and Thomas Johansson to make an impressive quarterfinal in Madrid.

In 2003 he won his first ATP title of his career in Acapulco where he defeated Gastón Gaudio, Marcelo Ríos, Félix Mantilla and then Mariano Zabaleta in the final and reached his career-high ranking of World No. 16. In Estoril he reached the final but lost to Nikolay Davydenko. In Hamburg he made his greatest result reaching the final before losing to Guillermo Coria in straight sets. He also posted a stunning win against former No. 1 Juan Carlos Ferrero in Davis Cup.

In 2004 he beat Andre Agassi in Miami before losing to Vince Spadea and reached the decisive match at Costa Do Sauipe. In 2005 he lost the final in Amersfoort to Chilean Fernando González.

Calleri won his second career title in the 2006 Generali Open at Kitzbühel which came 3 years after his first title in Acapulco for the loss of only one set along the way he defeated Nicolás Massú, Gastón Gaudio, Fernando Verdasco before defeating fellow countryman Juan Ignacio Chela 7–6 (9) 6–2 6–3. Calleri made his first final on hardcourt in New Haven losing to Russian Nikolay Davydenko 6–4 6–3 and after this result will move inside the top 30 in the ATP rankings. At the 2007 US Open, Calleri made it to the third round after defeating Lleyton Hewitt 4–6 6–4 6–4 6–2.

Calleri announced his retirement in February 2010 at the age of 33.

== ATP career finals ==
=== Singles: 8 (2 titles, 6 runner-ups) ===
Legend Grand Slam Tournaments (0–0) ATP World Tour Finals (0–0) ATP Masters Series (0–1) ATP Championship Series (2–0) ATP World Series (0–5)	Finals by surface Hard (0–1) Clay (2–5) Grass (0–0) Carpet (0–0)	Finals by setting Outdoors (2–6) Indoors (0–0)

Result	W–L	Date	Tournament	Tier	Surface	Opponent	Score
Loss	0–1	Feb 2002	Buenos Aires, Argentina	International Series	Clay	(Chile) Nicolás Massú	6–2, 6–7^{(5–7)}, 2–6
Win	1–1	Mar 2003	Acapulco, Mexico	Championship Series	Clay	(Argentina) Mariano Zabaleta	7–5, 3–6, 6–3
Loss	1–2	Apr 2003	Estoril, Portugal	International Series	Clay	(Russia) Nikolay Davydenko	4–6, 3–6
Loss	1–3	May 2003	Hamburg, Germany	Masters Series	Clay	(Argentina) Guillermo Coria	3–6, 4–6, 4–6
Loss	1–4	Mar 2004	Costa do Sauipe, Brazil	International Series	Clay	(Brazil) Gustavo Kuerten	6–3, 2–6, 3–6
Loss	1–5	Jul 2005	Amersfoort, Netherlands	International Series	Clay	(Chile) Fernando González	5–7, 3–6
Win	2–5	Jul 2006	Kitzbühel, Austria	Championship Series	Clay	(Argentina) Juan Ignacio Chela	7–6^{(11–9)}, 6–2, 6–3
Loss	2–6	Aug 2006	New Haven, United States	International Series	Hard	(Russia) Nikolay Davydenko	4–6, 3–6

=== Doubles: 4 (3 titles, 1 runner-up) ===
Legend Grand Slam Tournaments (0–0) ATP World Tour Finals (0–0) ATP Masters Series (0–0) ATP Championship Series (0–1) ATP World Series (3–0)	Finals by surface Hard (0–0) Clay (2–1) Grass (0–0) Carpet (1–0)	Finals by setting Outdoors (2–1) Indoors (1–0)

Result	W–L	Date	Tournament	Tier	Surface	Partner	Opponents	Score
Win	1–0	Feb 2003	Viña del Mar, Chile	International Series	Clay	(Argentina) Mariano Hood	(Czech Republic) František Čermák (Czech Republic) Leoš Friedl	6–3, 1–6, 6–4
Win	2–0	Oct 2005	Basel, Switzerland	International Series	Carpet	(Chile) Fernando González	(Australia) Stephen Huss (South Africa) Wesley Moodie	7–5, 7–5
Win	3–0	Feb 2008	Buenos Aires, Argentina	International Series	Clay	(Peru) Luis Horna	(Austria) Werner Eschauer (Australia) Peter Luczak	6–0, 6–7^{(6–8)}, [10–2]
Loss	3–1	Mar 2008	Acapulco, Mexico	Championship Series	Clay	(Peru) Luis Horna	(Austria) Oliver Marach (Slovakia) Michal Mertiňák	2–6, 7–6^{(7–3)}, [7–10]

== ATP Challenger and ITF Futures finals ==
=== Singles: 12 (11–1) ===
Legend ATP Challenger (9–1) ITF Futures (2–0)	Finals by surface Hard (0–0) Clay (11–1) Grass (0–0) Carpet (0–0)

Result	W–L	Date	Tournament	Tier	Surface	Opponent	Score
Win	1–0	Apr 1998	Italy F4, Rome	Futures	Clay	(Italy) Pietro Angelini	6–4, 4–6, 7–5
Win	2–0	May 1998	Italy F5, Frascati	Futures	Clay	(Italy) Giorgio Galimberti	6–1, 6–2
Win	3–0	Jun 1998	Weiden, Germany	Challenger	Clay	(Argentina) Gastón Etlis	6–2, 6–1
Win	4–0	Jul 1998	Newcastle, United Kingdom	Challenger	Clay	(Spain) Salvador Navarro-Gutierrez	6–3, 6–4
Win	5–0	Apr 2000	San Luis Potosí, Mexico	Challenger	Clay	(Argentina) Mariano Hood	7–5, 6–4
Loss	5–1	May 2000	Zagreb, Croatia	Challenger	Clay	(Argentina) Gastón Etlis	3–6, 5–7
Win	6–1	Jul 2000	Venice, Italy	Challenger	Clay	(Spain) Jacobo Díaz-Ruiz	6–0, 6–1
Win	7–1	Oct 2001	Guadalajara, Mexico	Challenger	Clay	(Argentina) Edgardo Massa	6–4, 6–4
Win	8–1	Oct 2001	São Paulo, Brazil	Challenger	Clay	(Argentina) Juan Ignacio Chela	6–4, 6–3
Win	9–1	Nov 2001	Buenos Aires, Argentina	Challenger	Clay	(Argentina) David Nalbandian	3–6, 6–1, 6–3
Win	10–1	Sep 2005	Szczecin, Poland	Challenger	Clay	(Spain) Alberto Martín	4–6, 6–2, 6–4
Win	11–1	Jun 2008	Prostějov, Czech Republic	Challenger	Clay	(Argentina) Martín Vassallo Argüello	6–0, 6–3

=== Doubles: 9 (6–3) ===
Legend ATP Challenger (4–3) ITF Futures (2–0)	Finals by surface Hard (0–0) Clay (6–3) Grass (0–0) Carpet (0–0)

Result	W–L	Date	Tournament	Tier	Surface	Partner	Opponents	Score
Win	1–0	Apr 1998	Italy F3, Rome	Futures	Clay	(Argentina) Oscar Rodriguez	(Argentina) Dante Bottini (Argentina) Daniel Caracciolo	6–3, 5–7, 6–4
Win	2–0	Apr 1998	Italy F4, Rome	Futures	Clay	(Croatia) Igor Saric	(Italy) Giorgio Galimberti (Italy) Massimo Valeri	6–3, 6–4
Win	3–0	Aug 1998	Scheveningen, Netherlands	Challenger	Clay	(Sweden) Tobias Hildebrand	(Argentina) Sebastián Prieto (Argentina) Martín Rodríguez	6–2, 3–6, 6–2
Win	4–0	Oct 1998	Montevideo, Uruguay	Challenger	Clay	(Argentina) Francisco Cabello	(Brazil) Paulo Taicher (Brazil) Cristiano Testa	6–4, 6–4
Loss	4–1	Jun 1999	Biella, Italy	Challenger	Clay	(Spain) Salvador Navarro-Gutierrez	(Italy) Filippo Messori (Italy) Massimo Valeri	5–7, 4–6
Loss	4–2	Oct 2001	Guadalajara, Mexico	Challenger	Clay	(Argentina) Ignacio Hirigoyen	(Argentina) Martín Rodríguez (Argentina) Gastón Etlis	5–7, 5–7
Win	5–2	Oct 2001	São Paulo, Brazil	Challenger	Clay	(Argentina) Edgardo Massa	(Argentina) Diego del Río (Argentina) Mariano Hood	5–7, 7–5, 6–3
Loss	5–3	Sep 2005	Szczecin, Poland	Challenger	Clay	(Argentina) Sebastián Prieto	(Poland) Mariusz Fyrstenberg (Poland) Marcin Matkowski	2–6, 4–6
Win	6–3	Jul 2006	Biella, Italy	Challenger	Clay	(Argentina) Lucas Arnold Ker	(Argentina) Martín Vassallo Argüello (Argentina) Juan Martín del Potro	7–6^{(7–5)}, 6–2

== Performance timelines ==
Key
W	F	SF	QF	#R	RR	Q#	P#	DNQ	A	Z#	PO	G	S	B	NMS	NTI	P	NH

(W) winner; (F) finalist; (SF) semifinalist; (QF) quarterfinalist; (#R) rounds 4, 3, 2, 1; (RR) round-robin stage; (Q#) qualification round; (P#) preliminary round; (DNQ) did not qualify; (A) absent; (Z#) Davis/Fed Cup Zonal Group (with number indication) or (PO) play-off; (G) gold, (S) silver or (B) bronze Olympic/Paralympic medal; (NMS) not a Masters tournament; (NTI) not a Tier I tournament; (P) postponed; (NH) not held; (SR) strike rate (events won / competed); (W–L) win–loss record.

=== Singles ===
Tournament	1998	1999	2000	2001	2002	2003	2004	2005	2006	2007	2008	2009	SR	W–L	Win%
Grand Slam tournaments
Australian Open	A	A	A	2R	1R	1R	2R	2R	1R	1R	2R	1R	0 / 9	4–9	31%
French Open	Q1	2R	3R	2R	1R	1R	1R	A	A	1R	1R	1R	0 / 9	4–9	31%
Wimbledon	Q1	A	A	1R	1R	2R	A	A	2R	2R	2R	1R	0 / 7	4–7	36%
US Open	A	A	3R	1R	1R	2R	A	1R	1R	3R	2R	A	0 / 8	6–8	43%
Win–loss	0–0	1–1	4–2	2–4	0–4	2–4	1–2	1–2	1–3	3–4	3–4	0–3	0 / 33	18–33	35%
National Representation
Summer Olympics	NH		A	Not Held			2R	Not Held			2R	NH	0 / 2	2–2	50%
ATP Tour Masters 1000
Indian Wells	A	A	A	Q1	A	3R	4R	2R	1R	2R	A	A	0 / 5	5–5	50%
Miami	A	Q2	2R	1R	3R	2R	QF	1R	QF	A	1R	2R	0 / 9	12–9	57%
Monte Carlo	A	Q1	A	Q2	1R	1R	3R	1R	A	A	1R	A	0 / 5	2–5	29%
Rome	A	A	A	Q2	3R	2R	A	A	A	1R	A	A	0 / 3	3–3	50%
Hamburg	A	A	A	2R	A	F	A	A	A	1R	A	NMS	0 / 3	6–3	67%
Canada	A	A	A	A	A	1R	A	A	A	1R	A	A	0 / 2	0–2	0%
Cincinnati	A	A	A	A	A	1R	A	A	A	1R	A	A	0 / 2	0–2	0%
Madrid	Not Masters Series				QF	2R	1R	2R	2R	2R	A	A	0 / 6	6–6	50%
Paris	A	A	A	A	A	1R	A	A	A	A	A	A	0 / 1	0–1	0%
Win–loss	0–0	0–0	1–1	1–2	7–4	9–9	7–4	2–4	5–3	1–6	0–2	1–1	0 / 36	34–36	49%

=== Doubles ===
Tournament	2003	2004	2005	2006	2007	2008	2009	SR	W–L	Win%
Grand Slam tournaments
Australian Open	A	A	1R	1R	A	2R	1R	0 / 4	1–4	20%
French Open	A	A	A	A	A	1R	A	0 / 1	0–1	0%
Wimbledon	1R	A	A	A	1R	A	A	0 / 2	0–2	0%
US Open	1R	A	A	1R	2R	2R	A	0 / 4	2–4	33%
Win–loss	0–2	0–0	0–1	0–2	1–2	2–3	0–1	0 / 11	3–11	21%
National Representation
Summer Olympics	NH	A	Not Held			1R	NH	0 / 1	0–1	0%
ATP Tour Masters 1000
Indian Wells	A	1R	A	1R	1R	A	A	0 / 3	0–3	0%
Miami	A	1R	A	A	A	2R	A	0 / 2	1–2	33%
Monte Carlo	A	2R	A	A	A	A	A	0 / 1	1–1	50%
Rome	2R	A	A	A	A	A	A	0 / 1	1–1	50%
Hamburg	A	A	A	A	2R	A	NMS	0 / 1	1–1	50%
Canada	1R	A	A	A	A	A	A	0 / 1	0–1	0%
Madrid	1R	A	A	A	A	1R	A	0 / 2	0–2	0%
Paris	1R	A	A	A	A	A	A	0 / 1	0–1	0%
Win–loss	1–4	1–3	0–0	0–1	1–2	1–2	0–0	0 / 12	4–12	25%
