= 2006 US Open – Women's singles qualifying =

Women's singles qualifying
- 2006 US Open

Events
Singles	men	women		boys	girls
Doubles	men	women	mixed	boys	girls
WC Singles	men	women	quad
WC Doubles	men	women	quad
Legends	men	women	mixed

Qualification
Singles	men	women
- US Open

This article displays the qualifying draw for the Women's Singles at the 2006 US Open.

== Seeds ==
1. (Australia) Nicole Pratt (qualifying competition, lucky loser)
2. (Russia) Vasilisa Bardina (qualified)
3. (Ukraine) Yuliya Beygelzimer (qualified)
4. (Czech Republic) Eva Birnerová (qualified)
5. (Russia) Olga Puchkova (qualified)
6. (Croatia) Ivana Lisjak (second round)
7. (Ukraine) Kateryna Bondarenko (first round)
8. (United States) Lilia Osterloh (first round)
9. (Thailand) Tamarine Tanasugarn (first round)
10. (Spain) María José Martínez Sánchez (qualifying competition, lucky loser)
11. (Belarus) Tatiana Poutchek (qualified)
12. (Uzbekistan) Varvara Lepchenko (qualified)
13. (Switzerland) Emmanuelle Gagliardi (qualifying competition)
14. (Belgium) Kirsten Flipkens (qualified)
15. (Romania) Edina Gallovits (first round)
16. (Canada) Stéphanie Dubois (qualified)
17. (Spain) Laura Pous Tió (qualifying competition)
18. (Hungary) Kira Nagy (second round)
19. (Venezuela) Milagros Sequera (qualified)
20. (Poland) Agnieszka Radwańska (qualified)
21. (Germany) Sandra Klösel (qualified)
22. (Germany) Kristina Barrois (qualified)
23. (Canada) Aleksandra Wozniak (second round)
24. (Russia) Lioudmila Skavronskaia (qualified)
25. (Italy) Alberta Brianti (second round)
26. (Israel) Tzipora Obziler (second round)
27. (Chinese Taipei) Chan Yung-jan (qualified)
28. (Romania) Anda Perianu (first round)
29. (Russia) Yaroslava Shvedova (qualifying competition)
30. (United Kingdom) Anne Keothavong (first round)
31. (Luxembourg) Anne Kremer (second round)
32. (Italy) Antonella Serra Zanetti (first round)

== Qualifiers ==
1. (Chinese Taipei) Chan Yung-jan
2. (Russia) Vasilisa Bardina
3. (Ukraine) Yuliya Beygelzimer
4. (Czech Republic) Eva Birnerová
5. (Russia) Olga Puchkova
6. (Russia) Lioudmila Skavronskaia
7. (Poland) Agnieszka Radwańska
8. (France) Youlia Fedossova
9. (Germany) Sandra Klösel
10. (Argentina) Clarisa Fernández
11. (Belarus) Tatiana Poutchek
12. (Uzbekistan) Varvara Lepchenko
13. (Venezuela) Milagros Sequera
14. (Belgium) Kirsten Flipkens
15. (Germany) Kristina Barrois
16. (Canada) Stéphanie Dubois

== Lucky losers ==
1. (Australia) Nicole Pratt
2. (Spain) María José Martínez Sánchez

== Qualifying draw ==
Key

- Q = Qualifier
- WC = Wild card
- LL = Lucky loser
- Alt = Alternate
- ITF = ITF entry
- PR = Protected ranking
- SR = Special ranking
- SE = Special exempt
- JE = Junior exempt
- JR = Junior Accelerator Programme entrant
- CO = College Accelerator Programme entrant
- NG = Next Gen Accelerator Program entrant
- w/o = Walkover
- r = Retired
- d = Defaulted

=== First qualifier ===
First round
1	(Australia) Nicole Pratt	7^{7}	6
(Puerto Rico) Vilmarie Castellvi	6^{1}	3
(United States) Lindsay Lee-Waters	3	7^{7}	6
(United States) Neha Uberoi	6	6^{5}	4
(Russia) Nina Bratchikova	4	6	1
(Germany) Vanessa Henke	6	3	6
(Portugal) Frederica Piedade	1	1
27	(Chinese Taipei) Chan Yung-jan	6	6

Second round
1	(Australia) Nicole Pratt	6^{4}	6	6
(United States) Lindsay Lee-Waters	7^{7}	4	3
(Germany) Vanessa Henke	6^{3}	4
27	(Chinese Taipei) Chan Yung-jan	7^{7}	6

Qualifying competition
1	(Australia) Nicole Pratt	1	2
27	(Chinese Taipei) Chan Yung-jan	6	6

=== Second qualifier ===
First round
2	(Russia) Vasilisa Bardina	6	6
(Hungary) Anikó Kapros	1	3
(Czech Republic) Libuše Prušová	6	6
(United States) Tiffany Dabek	4	2
(Argentina) Mariana Díaz Oliva	6	6
(Czech Republic) Olga Blahotová	4	3
WC	(United States) Chelsey Gullickson	4	0
17	(Spain) Laura Pous Tió	6	6

Second round
2	(Russia) Vasilisa Bardina	6	6
(Czech Republic) Libuše Prušová	1	1
(Argentina) Mariana Díaz Oliva	1	3
17	(Spain) Laura Pous Tió	6	6

Qualifying competition
2	(Russia) Vasilisa Bardina	7	6
17	(Spain) Laura Pous Tió	5	4

=== Third qualifier ===
First round
3	(Ukraine) Yuliya Beygelzimer	6	6
(Chinese Taipei) Chan Chin-wei	1	2
(Slovakia) Katarína Kachlíková	6	3	3
WC	(United States) Madison Brengle	2	6	6
(Uzbekistan) Akgul Amanmuradova	3	2
(Germany) Angelika Bachmann	6	6
(France) Mathilde Johansson	6	6
32	(Italy) Antonella Serra Zanetti	3	1

Second round
3	(Ukraine) Yuliya Beygelzimer	6	7
WC	(United States) Madison Brengle	3	5
(Germany) Angelika Bachmann	6	6
(France) Mathilde Johansson	4	4

Qualifying competition
3	(Ukraine) Yuliya Beygelzimer	6	1	6
(Germany) Angelika Bachmann	4	6	4

=== Fourth qualifier ===
First round
4	(Czech Republic) Eva Birnerová	6	7^{7}
(Japan) Ayumi Morita	4	6^{2}
(Japan) Miho Saeki	2	6	3
(Hungary) Zsófia Gubacsi	6	2	6
(Germany) Kathrin Wörle	6	5	3
(United States) Sunitha Rao	3	7	6
(Italy) Giulia Gabba	7^{7}	4	5
29	(Russia) Yaroslava Shvedova	6^{3}	6	7

Second round
4	(Czech Republic) Eva Birnerová	6	6
(Hungary) Zsófia Gubacsi	3	1
(United States) Sunitha Rao	7^{8}	4	4
29	(Russia) Yaroslava Shvedova	6^{6}	6	6

Qualifying competition
4	(Czech Republic) Eva Birnerová	7	7^{7}
29	(Russia) Yaroslava Shvedova	5	6^{0}

=== Fifth qualifier ===
First round
5	(Russia) Olga Puchkova	4	6	6
(France) Virginie Pichet	6	2	3
(France) Stéphanie Cohen-Aloro	6	3	7^{8}
(United Kingdom) Sarah Borwell	2	6	6^{6}
(Germany) Sabine Klaschka	3	1
(Japan) Ryōko Fuda	6	6
(United Kingdom) Melanie South	4	1
18	(Hungary) Kira Nagy	6	6

Second round
5	(Russia) Olga Puchkova	6	3	6
(France) Stéphanie Cohen-Aloro	2	6	4
(Japan) Ryōko Fuda	6	6
18	(Hungary) Kira Nagy	2	3

Qualifying competition
5	(Russia) Olga Puchkova	6	6
(Japan) Ryōko Fuda	1	3

=== Sixth qualifier ===
First round
6	(Croatia) Ivana Lisjak	6	3	6
(Ukraine) Oxana Lyubtsova	2	6	1
(Japan) Junri Namigata	6	6^{5}	6
(Israel) Yevgenia Savranska	3	7^{7}	2
(Puerto Rico) Kristina Brandi	6	6
(Austria) Yvonne Meusburger	3	3
(United States) Carly Gullickson	4	5
24	(Russia) Lioudmila Skavronskaia	6	7

Second round
6	(Croatia) Ivana Lisjak	3	0
(Japan) Junri Namigata	6	6
(Puerto Rico) Kristina Brandi	6^{5}	6	1
24	(Russia) Lioudmila Skavronskaia	7^{7}	4	6

Qualifying competition
(Japan) Junri Namigata	1	6^{8}
24	(Russia) Lioudmila Skavronskaia	6	7^{10}

=== Seventh qualifier ===
First round
7	(Ukraine) Kateryna Bondarenko	2	6	4
(Italy) Valentina Sassi	6	2	6
(Italy) Sara Errani	6^{3}	2
(India) Shikha Uberoi	7^{7}	6
WC	(United States) Julia Cohen	4	6	1
(France) Pauline Parmentier	6	2	6
(Republic of Ireland) Kelly Liggan	3^{r}
20	(Poland) Agnieszka Radwańska	4

Second round
(Italy) Valentina Sassi	1	6^{6}
(India) Shikha Uberoi	6	7^{8}
(France) Pauline Parmentier	1	1
20	(Poland) Agnieszka Radwańska	6	6

Qualifying competition
(India) Shikha Uberoi	3	1
20	(Poland) Agnieszka Radwańska	6	6

=== Eighth qualifier ===
First round
8	(United States) Lilia Osterloh	6	3	2
(United States) Angela Haynes	4	6	6
(Thailand) Suchanun Viratprasert	7^{7}	6
WC	(United States) Mary Gambale	6^{3}	1
(Russia) Tatiana Panova	4	2
(Brazil) Maria-Fernanda Alves	6	6
WC	(France) Youlia Fedossova	6	1	6
30	(United Kingdom) Anne Keothavong	4	6	3

Second round
(United States) Angela Haynes	6	6
(Thailand) Suchanun Viratprasert	2	4
(Brazil) Maria-Fernanda Alves	6	3	4
WC	(France) Youlia Fedossova	2	6	6

Qualifying competition
(United States) Angela Haynes	4	7^{7}	3
WC	(France) Youlia Fedossova	6	6^{2}	6

=== Ninth qualifier ===
First round
9	(Thailand) Tamarine Tanasugarn	3	1
(Russia) Alisa Kleybanova	6	6
(Japan) Shiho Hisamatsu	6	6
(Czech Republic) Michaela Paštiková	4	4
(Croatia) Ana Vrljić	6	6
(Slovakia) Dominika Nociarová	3	4
(Venezuela) María Vento-Kabchi	4	6	4
21	(Germany) Sandra Klösel	6	4	6

Second round
(Russia) Alisa Kleybanova	5	6	6
(Japan) Shiho Hisamatsu	7	3	3
(Croatia) Ana Vrljić	4	7	4
21	(Germany) Sandra Klösel	6	5	6

Qualifying competition
(Russia) Alisa Kleybanova	3	3
21	(Germany) Sandra Klösel	6	6

=== Tenth qualifier ===
First round
10	(Spain) María José Martínez Sánchez	2	7	6
(Czech Republic) Andrea Hlaváčková	6	5	1
(Netherlands) Elise Tamaëla	4	1
(Czech Republic) Petra Cetkovská	6	6
(China) Li Ting	2	6	4
(Argentina) Clarisa Fernández	6	4	6
(Italy) Adriana Serra Zanetti	1	2
26	(Israel) Tzipora Obziler	6	6

Second round
10	(Spain) María José Martínez Sánchez	3	7	6
(Czech Republic) Petra Cetkovská	6	5	2
(Argentina) Clarisa Fernández	7^{7}	1	6
26	(Israel) Tzipora Obziler	6^{4}	6	4

Qualifying competition
10	(Spain) María José Martínez Sánchez	3	6	2
(Argentina) Clarisa Fernández	6	3	6

=== Eleventh qualifier ===
First round
11	(Belarus) Tatiana Poutchek	7^{7}	6
WC	(United States) Alexandra Stevenson	6^{3}	1
(France) Florence Haring	0	6	6^{3}
(Croatia) Ivana Abramovic	6	2	7^{7}
(Luxembourg) Claudine Schaul	6	6
(Austria) Daniela Kix	1	2
(Georgia (country)) Margalita Chakhnashvili	2	6	5
25	(Italy) Alberta Brianti	6	3	7

Second round
11	(Belarus) Tatiana Poutchek	6	2	6
(Croatia) Ivana Abramovic	4	6	0
(Luxembourg) Claudine Schaul	7	6^{5}	6
25	(Italy) Alberta Brianti	5	7^{7}	4

Qualifying competition
11	(Belarus) Tatiana Poutchek	6	7^{7}
(Luxembourg) Claudine Schaul	1	6^{5}

=== Twelfth qualifier ===
First round
12	(Uzbekistan) Varvara Lepchenko	6	4	6
WC	(United States) Jamie Hampton	3	6	2
(Japan) Erika Takao	6	3	6
PR	(Paraguay) Rossana de los Ríos	4	6	2
(United Kingdom) Katie O'Brien	7	5	3
WC	(United States) Ashley Weinhold	5	7	6
(Brazil) Jenifer Widjaja	4	4
31	(Luxembourg) Anne Kremer	6	6

Second round
12	(Uzbekistan) Varvara Lepchenko	6	4	6
(Japan) Erika Takao	0	6	2
WC	(United States) Ashley Weinhold	3	7	7^{7}
31	(Luxembourg) Anne Kremer	6	5	6^{3}

Qualifying competition
12	(Uzbekistan) Varvara Lepchenko	6	6
WC	(United States) Ashley Weinhold	3	1

=== Thirteenth qualifier ===
First round
13	(Switzerland) Emmanuelle Gagliardi	6	4	6
(Czech Republic) Lenka Nemecková	0	6	0
(Argentina) Soledad Esperón	4	2
(Czech Republic) Barbora Strýcová	6	6
(Austria) Tina Schiechtl	6	5	2
(Tunisia) Selima Sfar	4	7	6
(Germany) Gréta Arn	0	1
19	(Venezuela) Milagros Sequera	6	6

Second round
13	(Switzerland) Emmanuelle Gagliardi	6	7
(Czech Republic) Barbora Strýcová	3	5
(Tunisia) Selima Sfar	2	1
19	(Venezuela) Milagros Sequera	6	6

Qualifying competition
13	(Switzerland) Emmanuelle Gagliardi	5	6	5
19	(Venezuela) Milagros Sequera	7	2	7

=== Fourteenth qualifier ===
First round
14	(Belgium) Kirsten Flipkens	3	6	6
(Serbia) Ana Timotić	6	4	1
(Czech Republic) Sandra Záhlavová	6	6
(Argentina) Jorgelina Cravero	4	3
(South Africa) Natalie Grandin	6	6
(Ukraine) Tatiana Perebiynis	1	2
(Chinese Taipei) Hsieh Su-wei	6	6
28	(Romania) Anda Perianu	3	1

Second round
14	(Belgium) Kirsten Flipkens	6	6
(Czech Republic) Sandra Záhlavová	3	4
(South Africa) Natalie Grandin	2	2
(Chinese Taipei) Hsieh Su-wei	6	6

Qualifying competition
14	(Belgium) Kirsten Flipkens	6	6
(Chinese Taipei) Hsieh Su-wei	4	1

=== Fifteenth qualifier ===
First round
15	(Romania) Edina Gallovits	4	3
WC	(United States) Ansley Cargill	6	6
(Russia) Alla Kudryavtseva	4	1
(Czech Republic) Renata Voráčová	6	6
(Czech Republic) Eva Hrdinová	4	6	5
(Italy) Nathalie Viérin	6	4	7
(Poland) Joanna Sakowicz	6^{3}	1
22	(Germany) Kristina Barrois	7^{7}	6

Second round
WC	(United States) Ansley Cargill	6	6^{3}	6
(Czech Republic) Renata Voráčová	4	7^{7}	2
(Italy) Nathalie Viérin	2	2
22	(Germany) Kristina Barrois	6	6

Qualifying competition
WC	(United States) Ansley Cargill	4	4
22	(Germany) Kristina Barrois	6	6

=== Sixteenth qualifier ===
First round
16	(Canada) Stéphanie Dubois	6	6
(Australia) Casey Dellacqua	3	2
(Argentina) María José Argeri	6	6
(Spain) Arantxa Parra Santonja	4	4
(Italy) Karin Knapp	6	7
(United States) Diana Ospina	4	5
(Estonia) Margit Rüütel	3	6^{6}
23	(Canada) Aleksandra Wozniak	6	7^{8}

Second round
16	(Canada) Stéphanie Dubois	6	3	7
(Argentina) María José Argeri	4	6	5
(Italy) Karin Knapp	6	6
23	(Canada) Aleksandra Wozniak	4	2

Qualifying competition
16	(Canada) Stéphanie Dubois	6	6
(Italy) Karin Knapp	4	1
