= 2006 US Open – Men's singles qualifying =

Men's singles qualifying
- 2006 US Open

Events
Singles	men	women		boys	girls
Doubles	men	women	mixed	boys	girls
WC Singles	men	women	quad
WC Doubles	men	women	quad
Legends	men	women	mixed

Qualification
Singles	men	women
- US Open

The 2006 US Open Men's Qualifying Tournament ran from August 22 to 25. Sixteen players qualified for the Men's Singles Main Draw, which started on August 28.

== Seeds ==
The seeded players are listed below. Players who have lost are listed with the round in which they exited.

1. (Canada) Frank Dancevic (second round)
2. (Germany) Denis Gremelmayr (qualifying competition)
3. (Czech Republic) Jiří Vaněk (qualified)
4. (Italy) Stefano Galvani (second round)
5. (Belgium) Dick Norman (first round)
6. (South Africa) Rik de Voest (second round)
7. (Ecuador) Nicolás Lapentti (qualifying competition)
8. (Germany) Benjamin Becker (qualified)
9. (Argentina) Juan Martín del Potro (qualified)
10. (Austria) Stefan Koubek (qualified)
11. (Denmark) Kristian Pless (qualified)
12. (Russia) Evgeny Korolev (qualifying competition)
13. (Thailand) Danai Udomchoke (first round)
14. (Denmark) Kenneth Carlsen (second round)
15. (Brazil) Thiago Alves (qualified)
16. (Chile) Paul Capdeville (second round)
17. (Colombia) Alejandro Falla (qualified)
18. (Austria) Alexander Peya (qualifying competition)
19. (Spain) Albert Portas (first round)
20. (France) Cyril Saulnier (first round)
21. (Brazil) Ricardo Mello (second round)
22. (Chinese Taipei) Lu Yen-hsun (first round)
23. (Czech Republic) Ivo Minář (qualifying competition)
24. (Serbia) Ilija Bozoljac (second round)
25. (France) Tomáš Zíb (qualifying competition)
26. (Argentina) Diego Hartfield (first round)
27. (Poland) Łukasz Kubot (qualified)
28. (United Kingdom) Alex Bogdanovic (first round)
29. (Australia) Peter Luczak (qualifying competition)
30. (Switzerland) George Bastl (qualified)
31. (United States) Robert Kendrick (qualified)
32. (United States) Amer Delić (qualifying competition)

== Qualifiers ==
1. (Colombia) Alejandro Falla
2. (Israel) Noam Okun
3. (Czech Republic) Jiří Vaněk
4. (Poland) Łukasz Kubot
5. (United Kingdom) Joshua Goodall
6. (United States) Jesse Witten
7. (Switzerland) George Bastl
8. (Germany) Benjamin Becker
9. (Argentina) Juan Martín del Potro
10. (Austria) Stefan Koubek
11. (Denmark) Kristian Pless
12. (United States) Robert Kendrick
13. (United States) Jeff Morrison
14. (Switzerland) Marco Chiudinelli
15. (Brazil) Thiago Alves
16. (United States) Michael Russell

== Draw ==
Key

- Q = Qualifier
- WC = Wild card
- LL = Lucky loser
- Alt = Alternate
- ITF = ITF entry
- PR = Protected ranking
- SR = Special ranking
- SE = Special exempt
- JE = Junior exempt
- JR = Junior Accelerator Programme entrant
- CO = College Accelerator Programme entrant
- NG = Next Gen Accelerator Program entrant
- w/o = Walkover
- r = Retired
- d = Defaulted

=== First qualifier ===
First round
1	(Canada) Frank Dancevic	6	6
WC	(United States) Tim Smyczek	1	4
PR	(Czech Republic) Bohdan Ulihrach	6	6^{4}	0
(United Kingdom) Martin Lee	3	7^{7}	0^{r}
(Argentina) Diego Junqueira	7	6^{8}	3
(Germany) Dominik Meffert	5	7^{10}	6
(Brazil) André Ghem	4	4
17	(Colombia) Alejandro Falla	6	6

Second round
1	(Canada) Frank Dancevic	4	2
PR	(Czech Republic) Bohdan Ulihrach	6	6
(Germany) Dominik Meffert	5	6^{4}
17	(Colombia) Alejandro Falla	7	7^{7}

Qualifying competition
PR	(Czech Republic) Bohdan Ulihrach	4	2
17	(Colombia) Alejandro Falla	6	6

=== Second qualifier ===
First round
2	(Germany) Denis Gremelmayr	6	7
(Australia) Alun Jones	3	5
WC	(United States) Nikita Kryvonos	6	4	6
(United States) Sam Warburg	1	6	3
(Israel) Dudi Sela	3	6	5
(Italy) Uros Vico	6	1	7
(Israel) Noam Okun	6	6
28	(United Kingdom) Alex Bogdanovic	4	2

Second round
2	(Germany) Denis Gremelmayr	6	6
WC	(United States) Nikita Kryvonos	4	3
(Italy) Uros Vico	3	0
(Israel) Noam Okun	6	6

Qualifying competition
2	(Germany) Denis Gremelmayr	3	3
(Israel) Noam Okun	6	6

=== Third qualifier ===
First round
3	(Czech Republic) Jiří Vaněk	5	6	6
(Germany) Mischa Zverev	7	1	4
(Sweden) Jacob Adaktusson	4	6	2
(United States) Glenn Weiner	6	3	6
WC	(United States) Marcus Fugate	3	0
(United States) Zack Fleishman	6	6
(Germany) Lars Uebel	4	2
23	(Czech Republic) Ivo Minář	6	6

Second round
3	(Czech Republic) Jiří Vaněk	6	6^{4}	6
(United States) Glenn Weiner	1	7^{7}	3
(United States) Zack Fleishman	3	5
23	(Czech Republic) Ivo Minář	6	7

Qualifying competition
3	(Czech Republic) Jiří Vaněk	6	7^{7}
23	(Czech Republic) Ivo Minář	3	6^{2}

=== Fourth qualifier ===
First round
4	(Italy) Stefano Galvani	3	6	6
(Colombia) Santiago Giraldo	6	3	2
(Czech Republic) Tomáš Cakl	6^{4}	1
(Netherlands) Peter Wessels	7^{7}	6
(Serbia) Viktor Troicki	7^{7}	6
(Australia) Luke Bourgeois	6^{3}	4
WC	(United States) Brendan Evans	1	2
27	(Poland) Łukasz Kubot	6	6

Second round
4	(Italy) Stefano Galvani	1	4
(Netherlands) Peter Wessels	6	6
(Serbia) Viktor Troicki	5	3
27	(Poland) Łukasz Kubot	7	6

Qualifying competition
(Netherlands) Peter Wessels	6^{3}	4
27	(Poland) Łukasz Kubot	7^{7}	6

=== Fifth qualifier ===
First round
5	(Belgium) Dick Norman	3	6^{4}
(Latvia) Ernests Gulbis	6	7^{7}
WC	(United States) Robert Yim	6^{5}	3
(France) Michaël Llodra	7^{7}	6
(United Kingdom) Joshua Goodall	7^{8}	7^{7}
(Germany) Benedikt Dorsch	6^{6}	6^{4}
(France) Jean-Michel Pequery	4	6	6
20	(France) Cyril Saulnier	6	4	4

Second round
(Latvia) Ernests Gulbis	6^{3}	4
(France) Michaël Llodra	7^{7}	6
(United Kingdom) Joshua Goodall	7	6
(France) Jean-Michel Pequery	5	3

Qualifying competition
(France) Michaël Llodra	6	6^{1}	6^{3}
(United Kingdom) Joshua Goodall	3	7^{7}	7^{7}

=== Sixth qualifier ===
First round
6	(South Africa) Rik de Voest	7	6
(Monaco) Benjamin Balleret	5	1
(Germany) Dieter Kindlmann	7	7^{10}
(Italy) Simone Vagnozzi	5	6^{8}
(United States) Jesse Witten	7	7
WC	(United States) Scott Oudsema	5	5
(Spain) Pablo Andújar	6^{3}	6	6
22	(Chinese Taipei) Lu Yen-hsun	7^{7}	3	3

Second round
6	(South Africa) Rik de Voest	2	2
(Germany) Dieter Kindlmann	6	6
(United States) Jesse Witten	6	3	6
(Spain) Pablo Andújar	2	6	2

Qualifying competition
(Germany) Dieter Kindlmann	3	4
(United States) Jesse Witten	6	6

=== Seventh qualifier ===
First round
7	(Ecuador) Nicolás Lapentti	6	6
(United States) Hugo Armando	3	4
(Australia) Nathan Healey	5	6	6
(Germany) Andreas Beck	7	4	2
(Italy) Federico Luzzi	4	7^{8}	6
(United States) John Paul Fruttero	6	6^{6}	2
30	(Switzerland) George Bastl	6	7
(Brazil) André Sá	2	5

Second round
7	(Ecuador) Nicolás Lapentti	6	6
(Australia) Nathan Healey	3	2
(Italy) Federico Luzzi	1	2
30	(Switzerland) George Bastl	6	6

Qualifying competition
7	(Ecuador) Nicolás Lapentti	3	6^{9}
30	(Switzerland) George Bastl	6	7^{11}

=== Eighth qualifier ===
First round
8	(Germany) Benjamin Becker	6	6
(Italy) Fabio Fognini	1	4
(Czech Republic) Radim Žitko	7	6
(Mexico) Santiago González	5	2
(Spain) Marcel Granollers	6	6
(Spain) Álex Calatrava	3	4
(United States) Rajeev Ram	4	7^{8}	3
32	(United States) Amer Delić	6	6^{6}	6

Second round
8	(Germany) Benjamin Becker	6	6
(Czech Republic) Radim Žitko	2	3
(Spain) Marcel Granollers	6	6^{5}	4
32	(United States) Amer Delić	3	7^{7}	6

Qualifying competition
8	(Germany) Benjamin Becker	6	6
32	(United States) Amer Delić	3	4

=== Ninth qualifier ===
First round
9	(Argentina) Juan Martín del Potro	6	6
(United States) Brian Vahaly	3	3
(Australia) Wayne Arthurs	7^{9}	6^{9}	6
(France) Antony Dupuis	6^{7}	7^{11}	3
(Austria) Daniel Köllerer	7^{7}	6
(Switzerland) Ivo Heuberger	6^{2}	4
(Czech Republic) Michal Tabara	6	6
26	(Argentina) Diego Hartfield	2	4

Second round
9	(Argentina) Juan Martín del Potro	7^{7}	7^{7}
(Australia) Wayne Arthurs	6^{1}	6^{2}
(Austria) Daniel Köllerer	6	6
(Czech Republic) Michal Tabara	3	0

Qualifying competition
9	(Argentina) Juan Martín del Potro	6	6
(Austria) Daniel Köllerer	3	2

=== Tenth qualifier ===
First round
10	(Austria) Stefan Koubek	6^{4}	6	6
(France) Jean-Christophe Faurel	7^{7}	2	2
(United States) Todd Widom	6	7
(Belgium) Steve Darcis	4	5
(Belgium) Gilles Elseneer	7^{9}	6
(Germany) Simon Stadler	6^{7}	2
(United Kingdom) Richard Bloomfield	6^{6}	5
25	(Czech Republic) Tomáš Zíb	7^{8}	7

Second round
10	(Austria) Stefan Koubek	6	6
(United States) Todd Widom	1	2
(Belgium) Gilles Elseneer	3	4
25	(Czech Republic) Tomáš Zíb	6	6

Qualifying competition
10	(Austria) Stefan Koubek	6	6
25	(Czech Republic) Tomáš Zíb	2	3

=== Eleventh qualifier ===
First round
11	(Denmark) Kristian Pless	6	6
(Italy) Giorgio Galimberti	3	4
(Switzerland) Stéphane Bohli	3	6	6
(Slovakia) Lukáš Lacko	6	3	4
WC	(United States) Jesse Levine	5	7^{7}	7^{7}
(Italy) Simone Bolelli	7	6^{0}	6^{2}
(Israel) Harel Levy	4	6	7
19	(Spain) Albert Portas	6	3	5

Second round
11	(Denmark) Kristian Pless	6	5	0
(Switzerland) Stéphane Bohli	2	7	0^{r}
WC	(United States) Jesse Levine	6^{6}	3
(Israel) Harel Levy	7^{8}	6

Qualifying competition
11	(Denmark) Kristian Pless	6	6
(Israel) Harel Levy	4	4

=== Twelfth qualifier ===
First round
12	(Russia) Evgeny Korolev	7^{7}	6
(Croatia) Marin Čilić	6^{4}	1
(Sweden) Filip Prpic	6	7
(Mexico) Bruno Echagaray	2	5
(United States) Bobby Reynolds	6	6
(Germany) Lars Burgsmüller	3	0
(Israel) Arvind Parmar	3	3
31	(United States) Robert Kendrick	6	6

Second round
12	(Russia) Evgeny Korolev	6	7
(Sweden) Filip Prpic	3	5
(United States) Bobby Reynolds	6	4	3
31	(United States) Robert Kendrick	3	6	6

Qualifying competition
12	(Russia) Evgeny Korolev	6^{9}	6	5
31	(United States) Robert Kendrick	7^{11}	4	7

=== Thirteenth qualifier ===
First round
13	(Thailand) Danai Udomchoke	3	3
(United States) Jeff Morrison	6	6
(Germany) Tobias Summerer	6	6
(Algeria) Lamine Ouahab	4	0
(Switzerland) Michael Lammer	7^{7}	5	6
(Italy) Andrea Stoppini	6^{2}	7	3
(Czech Republic) Jan Mertl	4	4
18	(Austria) Alexander Peya	6	6

Second round
(United States) Jeff Morrison	6	7
(Germany) Tobias Summerer	1	5
(Switzerland) Michael Lammer	2	6^{10}
18	(Austria) Alexander Peya	6	7^{12}

Qualifying competition
(United States) Jeff Morrison	6	7^{8}
18	(Austria) Alexander Peya	4	6^{6}

=== Fourteenth qualifier ===
First round
14	(Denmark) Kenneth Carlsen	6	6
(Ukraine) Sergiy Stakhovsky	4	4
(Switzerland) Marco Chiudinelli	6	6
(France) Gregory Carraz	3	4
(Czech Republic) Jan Vacek	6	5	7^{7}
(Kazakhstan) Alexey Kedryuk	4	7	6^{4}
(United States) Eric Nunez	1	6^{3}
21	(Brazil) Ricardo Mello	6	7^{7}

Second round
14	(Denmark) Kenneth Carlsen	6^{2}	3
(Switzerland) Marco Chiudinelli	7^{7}	6
(Czech Republic) Jan Vacek	6	4	7^{7}
21	(Brazil) Ricardo Mello	4	6	6^{3}

Qualifying competition
(Switzerland) Marco Chiudinelli	7^{7}	6
(Czech Republic) Jan Vacek	6^{5}	2

=== Fifteenth qualifier ===
First round
15	(Brazil) Thiago Alves	6	2	6
(Brazil) Júlio Silva	4	6	2
(Monaco) Jean-René Lisnard	6	1	6
(United States) Alex Bogomolov Jr.	3	6	2
(Italy) Paolo Lorenzi	6	7
(Slovakia) Ivo Klec	3	5
WC	(United States) Lesley Joseph	3	6	3
24	(Serbia) Ilija Bozoljac	6	4	6

Second round
15	(Brazil) Thiago Alves	6	4	6
(Monaco) Jean-René Lisnard	4	6	2
(Italy) Paolo Lorenzi	7^{7}	7^{7}
24	(Serbia) Ilija Bozoljac	6^{3}	6^{5}

Qualifying competition
15	(Brazil) Thiago Alves	6	6
(Italy) Paolo Lorenzi	3	3

=== Sixteenth qualifier ===
First round
16	(Chile) Paul Capdeville	3	2
(United States) Michael Russell	6	6
(Austria) Rainer Eitzinger	6	7
WC	(United States) Ryler de Heart	2	5
(Japan) Go Soeda	6	6
(Philippines) Cecil Mamiit	1	2
(Morocco) Younes El Aynaoui	3	5
24	(Australia) Peter Luczak	6	7

Second round
(United States) Michael Russell	6	6
(Austria) Rainer Eitzinger	4	3
(Japan) Go Soeda	6^{2}	2
24	(Australia) Peter Luczak	7^{7}	6

Qualifying competition
(United States) Michael Russell	1	7^{8}	6
24	(Australia) Peter Luczak	6	6^{6}	4
