= 2006 US Open – Girls' singles =

Girls' singles
- 2006 US Open

Final
- Champion: (Russia) Anastasia Pavlyuchenkova
- Runner-up: (Austria) Tamira Paszek
- Score: 3–6, 6–4, 7–5

Events
Singles	men	women		boys	girls
Doubles	men	women	mixed	boys	girls
WC Singles	men	women	quad
WC Doubles	men	women	quad
Legends	men	women	mixed
- US Open

The girls' singles tournament of the 2006 US Open was won by Anastasia Pavlyuchenkova, who beat Tamira Paszek in the final by 3–6, 6–4, 7–5.

Victoria Azarenka was the reigning champion, but she did not defend her title in the juniors this year, having already been elevated to the seniors.

== Seeds ==
1. (Russia) Anastasia Pavlyuchenkova (champion)
2. (Denmark) Caroline Wozniacki (first round)
3. (Japan) Ayumi Morita (third round)
4. (Romania) Mihaela Buzărnescu (third round)
5. (Ukraine) Khrystyna Antoniichuk (first round)
6. (United States) Julia Cohen (third round)
7. (Slovakia) Dominika Cibulková (second round)
8. (Romania) Sorana Cîrstea (third round)
9. (Belarus) Ksenia Milevskaya (second round)
10. (Romania) Ioana Raluca Olaru (Quarterfinal)
11. (Austria) Tamira Paszek (finalist)
12. (Romania) Alexandra Dulgheru (first round)
13. (Canada) Sharon Fichman (Quarterfinal)
14. (Poland) Urszula Radwańska (second round)
15. (United States) Mary Gambale (first round)
16. (Brazil) Teliana Pereira (first round)

== Draw ==
Key

- Q = Qualifier
- WC = Wild card
- LL = Lucky loser
- Alt = Alternate
- ITF = ITF entry
- PR = Protected ranking
- SR = Special ranking
- SE = Special exempt
- JE = Junior exempt
- JR = Junior Accelerator Programme entrant
- CO = College Accelerator Programme entrant
- NG = Next Gen Accelerator Program entrant
- w/o = Walkover
- r = Retired
- d = Defaulted

=== Finals ===
Semifinals				Final
1	(Russia) Anastasia Pavlyuchenkova	7^{7}	6
	(Czech Republic) Kateřina Vaňková	6^{4}	0	1	(Russia) A Pavlyuchenkova	3	6	7
	(United States) Lauren Albanese	2	2	11	(Austria) T Paszek	6	4	5
11	(Austria) Tamira Paszek	6	6

=== Top half ===
==== Section 1 ====
First round
1	(Russia) Anastasia Pavlyuchenkova	6	6
WC	(United States) Christina McHale	0	3
Q	(Austria) Melanie Klaffner	6	4	6
WC	(United States) Mallory Burdette	1	6	3
(Australia) Jessica Moore	4	3
Q	(United Kingdom) Jade Curtis	6	6
(Belgium) Yanina Wickmayer	7^{10}	4	3
14	(Poland) Urszula Radwańska	6^{8}	6	6
10	(Romania) Ioana Raluca Olaru	6	6
(Morocco) Fatima Zahrae El Allami	2	4
Q	(United States) Gail Brodsky	6	3	6
(Bolivia) María Fernanda Álvarez Terán	3	6	2
(Italy) Corinna Dentoni	7^{7}	5	5
(Hong Kong) Wing Yau Venise Chan	6^{3}	7	7
(Croatia) Tereza Mrdeža	6^{4}	6^{7}
6	(United States) Julia Cohen	7^{7}	7^{9}

Second round
1	(Russia) A Pavlyuchenkova	5	6	6
Q	(Austria) M Klaffner	7	0	2
Q	(United Kingdom) J Curtis	6	6
14	(Poland) U Radwańska	3	1
10	(Romania) IR Olaru	7^{7}	7
Q	(United States) G Brodsky	6^{0}	5
(Hong Kong) WYV Chan	4	0
6	(United States) J Cohen	6	6

Third round
1	(Russia) A Pavlyuchenkova	6	6
Q	(United Kingdom) J Curtis	2	2
10	(Romania) IR Olaru	7^{7}	4	6
6	(United States) J Cohen	6^{3}	6	3

Quarterfinals
1	(Russia) A Pavlyuchenkova	7	3	6
10	(Romania) IR Olaru	5	6	3

==== Section 2 ====
First round
4	(Romania) Mihaela Buzărnescu	6	6
(Germany) Katharina Killi	4	3
(Austria) Nikola Hofmanova	6	6
WC	(United States) Lauren Embree	4	1
(Slovakia) Kristína Kučová	6	6
WC	(United States) Jamie Hampton	4	3
WC	(United States) Mallory Cecil	4	1
13	(Canada) Sharon Fichman	6	6
5	(Ukraine) Khrystyna Antoniichuk	6^{3}	3
Q	(United States) Kristy Frilling	7^{7}	6
(Russia) Ksenia Pervak	6	6
(Brazil) Ana Clara Duarte	2	1
(United States) Lindsay Burdette	4	4
(Czech Republic) Kateřina Vaňková	6	6
Q	(United States) Julia Boserup	3	3
9	(Belarus) Ksenia Milevskaya	6	6

Second round
4	(Romania) M Buzărnescu	6	6
(Austria) N Hofmanova	1	3
(Slovakia) K Kučová	3	1
13	(Canada) S Fichman	6	6
Q	(United States) K Frilling	0	0
(Russia) K Pervak	6	6
(Czech Republic) K Vaňková	6^{2}	7^{7}	7
9	(Belarus) K Milevskaya	7^{7}	6^{3}	5

Third round
4	(Romania) M Buzărnescu	0	1
13	(Canada) S Fichman	6	6
(Russia) K Pervak	3	3
(Czech Republic) K Vaňková	6	6

Quarterfinals
13	(Canada) S Fichman	4	6	3
(Czech Republic) K Vaňková	6	1	6

=== Bottom half ===
==== Section 3 ====
First round
7	(Slovakia) Dominika Cibulková	6	6
Q	(Netherlands) Arantxa Rus	3	1
Q	(Slovakia) Reka Zsilinszka	3	1
(United States) Madison Brengle	6	6
(United States) Chelsey Gullickson	6	6
(Georgia (country)) Oksana Kalashnikova	1	2
(United States) Lauren Albanese	6	6
12	(Romania) Alexandra Dulgheru	3	1
15	(United States) Mary Gambale	3	4
Q	(Finland) Katariina Tuohimaa	6	6
(Croatia) Petra Martić	6	6
(Czech Republic) Andrea Berková	1	1
SE	(Russia) Ksenia Lykina	7	6
LL	(United States) Veronica Li	5	4
(United States) Kimberly Couts	6	4	1
3	(Japan) Ayumi Morita	2	6	6

Second round
7	(Slovakia) D Cibulková	3	3
(United States) M Brengle	6	6
(United States) C Gullickson	5	6	2
(United States) L Albanese	7	1	6
Q	(Finland) K Tuohimaa	4	0
(Croatia) P Martić	6	6
SE	(Russia) K Lykina	6	1	5
3	(Japan) A Morita	3	6	7

Third round
(United States) M Brengle	4	1
(United States) L Albanese	6	6
(Croatia) P Martić	7	6
3	(Japan) A Morita	5	0

Quarterfinals
(United States) L Albanese	6	6
(Croatia) P Martić	4	4

==== Section 4 ====
First round
8	(Romania) Sorana Cîrstea	7^{7}	6
(Sweden) Sandra Roma	6^{5}	2
(Mexico) Valeria Pulido	6	6
(Germany) Dominice Ripoll	1	3
(United Kingdom) Naomi Cavaday	7^{8}	6
(United States) Lena Litvak	6^{6}	4
WC	(United States) Melanie Oudin	2	4
11	(Austria) Tamira Paszek	6	6
16	(Brazil) Teliana Pereira	5	6	5
(Uzbekistan) Dilyara Saidkhodjayeva	7	4	7
(Philippines) Denise Dy	1	1
(New Zealand) Sacha Jones	6	6
WC	(United States) Ashley Weinhold	6	6
(Czech Republic) Kateřina Kramperová	4	2
(Russia) Alexandra Panova	4	2
2	(Denmark) Caroline Wozniacki	6	1	d.

Second round
8	(Romania) S Cîrstea	6	6
(Mexico) V Pulido	2	0
(United Kingdom) N Cavaday	6	4	0
11	(Austria) T Paszek	4	6	6
(Uzbekistan) D Saidkhodjayeva	6	3	1
(New Zealand) S Jones	4	6	6
WC	(United States) A Weinhold	6	3	6
(Russia) A Panova	3	6	3

Third round
8	(Romania) S Cîrstea	2	4
11	(Austria) T Paszek	6	6
(New Zealand) S Jones	2	6	7
WC	(United States) A Weinhold	6	2	5

Quarterfinals
11	(Austria) T Paszek	6	6
(New Zealand) S Jones	1	2

=== Qualifying draw ===
==== Qualifier 1 ====
First Match				Qualifying Match
1	(United States) Veronica Li	6	6
	(Israel) Nadine Fahoum	1	0	1	(United States) V Li	5	6	4
	(Portugal) Michelle Larcher de Brito	3	4	11	(United States) G Brodsky	7	2	6
11	(United States) Gail Brodsky	6	6

==== Qualifier 2 ====
First Match					Qualifying Match
2	(Japan) Emiko Ito	6	6
WC	(Japan) Yuka Matoba	3	1		2	(Japan) E Ito	3	7^{7}	4
WC	(United States) Carolyn McVeigh	7^{7}	0	4	16	(United States) K Frilling	6	6^{4}	6
16	(United States) Kristy Frilling	6^{5}	6	6

==== Qualifier 3 ====
First Match				Qualifying Match
3	(United States) Reka Zsilinszka	6	6
	(Japan) Erina Kikuchi	2	1	3	(United States) R Zsilinszka	6	6
	(Chinese Taipei) Kai-Chen Chang	2	2	13	(Germany) K Grajdek	0	4
13	(Germany) Kim Grajdek	6	6

==== Qualifier 4 ====
First Match					Qualifying Match
4	(Belgium) Tamaryn Hendler	6	3	4
WC	(United States) Alexandra Anghelescu	1	6	6	WC	(United States) A Anghelescu	1	3
	(Trinidad and Tobago) Olivia Bennett	0	1		14	(Finland) K Tuohimaa	6	6
14	(Finland) Katariina Tuohimaa	6	6

==== Qualifier 5 ====
First Match					Qualifying Match
5	(Austria) Melanie Klaffner	6	6
	(Chile) Giannina Minieri	1	0		5	(Austria) M Klaffner	3	6	6
	(Latvia) Trīna Šlapeka	3	7^{7}	5	12	(Israel) J Glushko	6	1	1
12	(Israel) Julia Glushko	6	6^{5}	7

==== Qualifier 6 ====
First Match					Qualifying Match
6	(United Kingdom) Jade Curtis	2	6	6
	(United States) Stefanie Nunic	6	4	3	6	(United Kingdom) J Curtis	6	7^{7}
	(Dominican Republic) Francesca Segarelli	6	3	6		(Dominican Republic) F Segarelli	0	6^{5}
15	(Japan) Saori Karikomi	2	6	3

==== Qualifier 7 ====
First Match				Qualifying Match
7	(Netherlands) Arantxa Rus	6	6
WC	(United States) Brittany Augustine	4	4	7	(Netherlands) A Rus	6	6
WC	(United States) Beatrice Capra	3	3	9	(United States) C Jones	1	3
9	(United States) Chloe Jones	6	6

==== Qualifier 8 ====
First Match				Qualifying Match
8	(Japan) Ai Yamamoto	6	6
	(Argentina) Alexandra Akhmedjanova	2	1	8	(Japan) A Yamamoto	1	0
WC	(United States) Julia Boserup	6	6	WC	(United States) J Boserup	6	6
10	(United States) Courtney Clayton	1	3
