= 2006 US Open – Girls' doubles =

2006 US tennis tournament Girls Doubles

Girls' doubles
- 2006 US Open

Final
- Champion: (Romania) Mihaela Buzărnescu (Romania) Ioana Raluca Olaru
- Runner-up: (Canada) Sharon Fichman (Russia) Anastasia Pavlyuchenkova
- Score: 7-5, 6-2

Events
Singles	men	women		boys	girls
Doubles	men	women	mixed	boys	girls
WC Singles	men	women	quad
WC Doubles	men	women	quad
Legends	men	women	mixed
- US Open

At the 2006 US Open, the winner of the girls' doubles competition was the team of Buzărnescu and Olaru, both from Romania, who were seeded second in the tournament. The runners-up were Sharon Fichman and Anastasia Pavlyuchenkova, from Canada and Russia, respectively, who were seeded first. The other semifinalists were the teams of Kramperová and Vaňková, from the Czech Republic, and Klaffner and Paszek, from Austria. Neither of these teams had been seeded.

== Seeds ==
1. (Canada) Sharon Fichman / (Russia) Anastasia Pavlyuchenkova (final)
2. (Romania) Mihaela Buzărnescu / (Romania) Ioana Raluca Olaru (champions)
3. (United States) Julia Cohen / (Italy) Corinna Dentoni (second round)
4. (Ukraine) Kristina Antoniychuk / (Slovakia) Kristína Kučová (second round)
5. (Romania) Alexandra Dulgheru / (Poland) Urszula Radwańska (first round)
6. (Romania) Sorana Cîrstea / (Russia) Alexandra Panova (third round)
7. (Hong Kong) Wing Yau Venise Chan / (Brazil) Teliana Pereira (second round)
8. (United Kingdom) Naomi Cavaday / (Germany) Dominice Ripoll (second round)

== Draw ==
Key

- Q = Qualifier
- WC = Wild card
- LL = Lucky loser
- Alt = Alternate
- ITF = ITF entry
- PR = Protected ranking
- SR = Special ranking
- SE = Special exempt
- JE = Junior exempt
- JR = Junior Accelerator Programme entrant
- CO = College Accelerator Programme entrant
- NG = Next Gen Accelerator Program entrant
- w/o = Walkover
- r = Retired
- d = Defaulted

=== Finals ===
Semifinals				Final
1	(Canada) Fichman (Russia) Pavlyuchenkova	7^{7}	7
	(Czech Republic) Kramperová (Czech Republic) Vaňková	6^{3}	5	1	(Canada) Fichman (Russia) Pavlyuchenkova	5	2
	(Austria) Klaffner (Austria) Paszek	1	2	2	(Romania) Buzărnescu (Romania) Olaru	7	6
2	(Romania) Buzărnescu (Romania) Olaru	6	6

=== Top half ===
First round
1	(Canada) Fichman (Russia) Pavlyuchenkova	6	6
WC	(United States) Cecil (United States) Oudin	3	1
WC	(United States) Anghelescu (United States) Augustine	6	3	1
(Bolivia) Álvarez Terán (Belgium) Wickmayer	2	6	6
(Brazil) Duarte (United States) Li	0	0
(United States) Gullickson (United States) Hampton	6	6
(Australia) Moore (Mexico) Pulido	3	0
8	(United Kingdom) Cavaday (Germany) Ripoll	6	6
4	(Ukraine) Antoniychuk (Slovakia) Kučová	6	6
WC	(United States) Clark (United States) Featherston	1	4
(Czech Republic) Kramperová (Czech Republic) Vaňková	6	6
WC	(United States) Embree (United States) McHale	3	1
(Georgia (country)) Kalashnikova (Germany) Killi	7	6
(United States) Boserup (United States) C. Jones	5	2
(United States) Brengle (United States) Couts	6	3	1
6	(Romania) Cîrstea (Russia) Panova	1	6	6

Second round
1	(Canada) Fichman (Russia) Pavlyuchenkova	6	6
(Bolivia) Álvarez Terán (Belgium) Wickmayer	1	0
(United States) Gullickson (United States) Hampton	7^{7}	6
8	(United Kingdom) Cavaday (Germany) Ripoll	6^{2}	1
4	(Ukraine) Antoniychuk (Slovakia) Kučová	1	3
(Czech Republic) Kramperová (Czech Republic) Vaňková	6	6
(Georgia (country)) Kalashnikova (Germany) Killi	3	4
6	(Romania) Cîrstea (Russia) Panova	6	6

Third round
1	(Canada) Fichman (Russia) Pavlyuchenkova	6	1	6
(United States) Gullickson (United States) Hampton	3	6	1
(Czech Republic) Kramperová (Czech Republic) Vaňková	7	0	7^{7}
6	(Romania) Cîrstea (Russia) Panova	5	6	6

Quarterfinals
1	(Canada) Fichman (Russia) Pavlyuchenkova	7^{7}	7
(Czech Republic) Kramperová (Czech Republic) Vaňková	6^{3}	5

=== Bottom half ===
First round
5	(Romania) Dulgheru (Poland) Radwańska	0	4
(Japan) Ito (Japan) Yamamoto	6	6
(Austria) Klaffner (Austria) Paszek	6	6
(United States) L. Burdette (United States) M. Burdette	4	0
(New Zealand) S. Jones (United States) Litvak	4	6	7^{7}
(United States) Nunic (Slovakia) Zsilinszka	6	4	6^{1}
(Russia) Lykina (Belarus) Milevskaya	7^{7}	3	2
3	(United States) Cohen (Italy) Dentoni	6^{5}	6	6
7	(Hong Kong) Chan (Brazil) Pereira	6	5	6
(United States) Brodsky (United Kingdom) Curtis	4	7	3
(Czech Republic) Berkova (Sweden) Roma	1	2
(United States) Frilling (United States) Weinhold	6	6
(Austria) Hofmanova (Uzbekistan) Saidkhodjayeva	6	1	7^{7}
(Philippines) Dy (Morocco) El Allami	4	6	6^{3}
(Croatia) Martić (Croatia) Mrdeža	3	3
2	(Romania) Buzărnescu (Romania) Olaru	6	6

Second round
(Japan) Ito (Japan) Yamamoto	2	5
(Austria) Klaffner (Austria) Paszek	6	7
(New Zealand) S. Jones (United States) Litvak	7	6
3	(United States) Cohen (Italy) Dentoni	5	2
7	(Hong Kong) Chan (Brazil) Pereira	2	1
(United States) Frilling (United States) Weinhold	6	6
(Austria) Hofmanova (Uzbekistan) Saidkhodjayeva	1	2
2	(Romania) Buzărnescu (Romania) Olaru	6	6

Third round
(Austria) Klaffner (Austria) Paszek	6	7
(New Zealand) S. Jones (United States) Litvak	4	5
(United States) Frilling (United States) Weinhold	4	1
2	(Romania) Buzărnescu (Romania) Olaru	6	6

Quarterfinals
(Austria) Klaffner (Austria) Paszek	1	2
2	(Romania) Buzărnescu (Romania) Olaru	6	6
