= Květa Peschke =

Czech tennis player

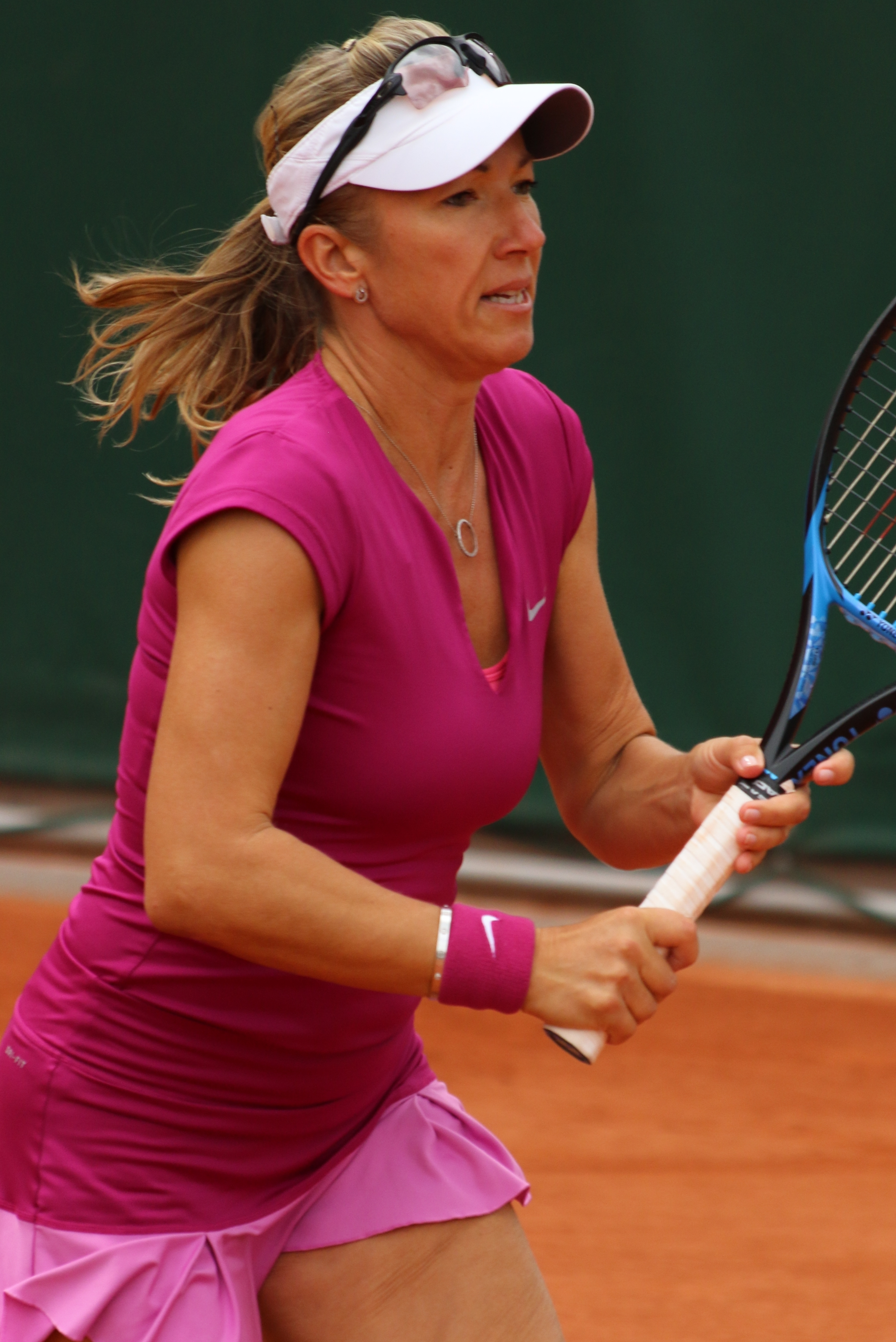
- Full name: Květoslava Peschkeová
- Country (sports): Czech Republic
- Residence: Sarasota, Florida, U.S.
- Born: 9 July 1975 (age 51) Bílovec, Czechoslovakia
- Height: 1.65 m (5 ft 5 in)
- Turned pro: 27 April 1993
- Retired: 8 April 2022
- Plays: Right-handed (two-handed backhand)
- Coach: Torsten Peschke
- Prize money: US$6,147,937

Singles
- Career record: 322–213
- Career titles: 1
- Highest ranking: No. 26 (7 November 2005)

Grand Slam singles results
- Australian Open: 3R (2000)
- French Open: 3R (1999, 2000)
- Wimbledon: 4R (2005)
- US Open: 2R (1998, 2000)

Doubles
- Career record: 662–387
- Career titles: 36
- Highest ranking: No. 1 (4 July 2011)
- Current ranking: No. 53 (6 December 2021)

Grand Slam doubles results
- Australian Open: SF (2011, 2014)
- French Open: F (2010)
- Wimbledon: W (2011)
- US Open: SF (2006, 2007)

Other doubles tournaments
- Tour Finals: F (2008, 2010, 2011)

Grand Slam mixed doubles results
- Australian Open: SF (2013)
- French Open: SF (2008)
- Wimbledon: SF (2019, 2021)
- US Open: F (2006, 2010, 2012)
- Last updated on: 12 December 2021.

Květoslava Peschke (Czech: Peschkeová, née Hrdličková; born 9 July 1975) is a Czech former professional tennis player who was ranked world No. 1 in doubles.

She reached a career-high singles ranking of No. 26 in November 2005, winning one WTA singles title in Makarska in 1998, but achieved most of her success in doubles. Peschke claimed her first Grand Slam title at the 2011 Wimbledon Championships, partnering Katarina Srebotnik. The pair also jointly attained the world No. 1 ranking in doubles for the next ten weeks, and were the 2011 WTA Doubles Team of the Year, having previously reached the final at the 2010 French Open. In mixed doubles, she finished runner-up at the US Open in 2006, 2010, and 2012, alongside Martin Damm, Aisam-ul-Haq Qureshi and Marcin Matkowski respectively.

Peschke won 36 doubles titles on the WTA Tour between 1998 and 2021, including seven at WTA 1000 level, and also finished runner-up at the WTA Finals on three occasions. Later in her career, she became well known for her longevity, returning to the Wimbledon doubles final in 2018 with Nicole Melichar, at the age of 43, and winning her final tour-level title at the 2021 Chicago Classic aged 46.

Peschke married her coach, Torsten Peschke, on 5 May 2003 in Berlin.

== Career ==
=== 2005–2010 ===
In her first event of the season, she reached the quarterfinals of the Tier-V event in Hobart. At Wimbledon, she reached the fourth round, defeating Vera Zvonareva and Conchita Martínez, a former winner. She reached her first semifinal of the year at the Tier-II-event in Linz, defeating Elena Dementieva, Zvonareva and Ai Sugiyama. She also reached a quarterfinal at another Tier-II-event, in Philadelphia, before losing to Dementieva in three sets.

Peschke's doubles career has been more successful, including her top-10 debut in the doubles ranking in September 2006. In 2005, she won two WTA doubles titles in Paris (Tier II) and in Linz (Tier II) and reached the finals of four WTA Tour doubles events. In 2006, she won WTA doubles titles, defending her 2005 title at Paris and winning in Dubai (Tier II). Her main successes in doubles came at three of the four grand slams, reaching the quarterfinals of the French Open, the quarterfinals of Wimbledon, and the semifinals of the US Open. Her partner in each event was Francesca Schiavone. She also lost in the 2006 US Open mixed doubles final with Martin Damm to Bob Bryan and Martina Navratilova.

At the 2007 US Open, Peschke and Rennae Stubbs reached the doubles semifinals, before losing to Nathalie Dechy and Dinara Safina. The Peschke-Stubbs team won their first title in Stuttgart. In the final, the team defeated Chan Yung-jan and Safina in three sets. Other titles included Los Angeles and the 2007 Zurich Open.

Peschke partnered with Aisam-ul-Haq Qureshi of Pakistan to reach the final of the mixed doubles at the US Open. In the final, Peschke and Qureshi lost to Bob Bryan and Liezel Huber, in straight sets.

=== 2011–2012 ===
Peschke and Slovenia's Katarina Srebotnik were one of the most victorious doubles teams in 2011. The pair won in Auckland, Doha, Carlsbad, Eastbourne and Beijing. In 2011, they also won their first Grand Slam title at Wimbledon, defeating Sabine Lisicki and Samantha Stosur in the final.

Peschke won two doubles titles in 2012, in Sydney with Srebotnik, and in Linz with Anna-Lena Grönefeld.

=== 2022: Retirement ===
Peschke announced her retirement on 8 April 2022, playing her final match at the Charleston Open, putting an end to career that span almost 30 years. At age 46 she was the oldest active player in the WTA rankings. She planned to retire officially at 2022 Wimbledon.

== World TeamTennis ==
Peschke has played eight seasons with World TeamTennis starting in 2008 when she debuted in the league with the Kansas City Explorers. She stayed with the Explorers for another three years (2008-2011), then played a season with the New York Sportimes in 2013, the San Diego Aviators in 2014, the Philadelphia Freedoms in 2017, and the Washington Kastles in 2019.

== Career statistics ==
=== Grand Slam tournament finals ===
==== Doubles: 3 (1 title, 2 runner-ups) ====
Result	Year	Championship	Surface	Partner	Opponents	Score
Loss	2010	French Open	Clay	(Slovenia) Katarina Srebotnik	(United States) Serena Williams (United States) Venus Williams	2–6, 3–6
Win	2011	Wimbledon	Grass	(Slovenia) Katarina Srebotnik	(Germany) Sabine Lisicki (Australia) Samantha Stosur	6–3, 6–1
Loss	2018	Wimbledon	Grass	(United States) Nicole Melichar	(Czech Republic) Barbora Krejčíková (Czech Republic) Kateřina Siniaková	4–6, 6–4, 0–6

==== Mixed doubles: 3 (3 runner-ups) ====
Result	Year	Championship	Surface	Partner	Opponents	Score
Loss	2006	US Open	Hard	(Czech Republic) Martin Damm	(United States) Martina Navratilova (United States) Bob Bryan	2–6, 3–6
Loss	2010	US Open	Hard	(Pakistan) Aisam-ul-Haq Qureshi	(United States) Liezel Huber (United States) Bob Bryan	4–6, 4–6
Loss	2012	US Open	Hard	(Poland) Marcin Matkowski	(Russia) Ekaterina Makarova (Brazil) Bruno Soares	7–6^{(10–8)}, 1–6, [10–12]

=== Grand Slam performance timelines ===
Key
W	F	SF	QF	#R	RR	Q#	P#	DNQ	A	Z#	PO	G	S	B	NMS	NTI	P	NH

(W) winner; (F) finalist; (SF) semifinalist; (QF) quarterfinalist; (#R) rounds 4, 3, 2, 1; (RR) round-robin stage; (Q#) qualification round; (P#) preliminary round; (DNQ) did not qualify; (A) absent; (Z#) Davis/Fed Cup Zonal Group (with number indication) or (PO) play-off; (G) gold, (S) silver or (B) bronze Olympic/Paralympic medal; (NMS) not a Masters tournament; (NTI) not a Tier I tournament; (P) postponed; (NH) not held; (SR) strike rate (events won / competed); (W–L) win–loss record.
To avoid confusion and double counting, these charts are updated at the conclusion of a tournament or when the player's participation has ended.

==== Singles ====
Tournament	1998	1999	2000	2001	2002	2003	2004	2005	2006	2007	SR	W–L
Australian Open	A	1R	3R	A	2R	A	A	1R	A	A	0 / 4	3–4
French Open	2R	3R	3R	1R	1R	A	2R	2R	1R	2R	0 / 9	8–9
Wimbledon	1R	1R	1R	A	2R	A	A	4R	2R	A	0 / 6	5–6
US Open	2R	1R	2R	1R	1R	A	A	1R	1R	A	0 / 7	2–7
Win–loss	2–3	2–4	5–4	0–2	2–4	0–0	1–1	4–4	1–3	1–1	0 / 26	18–26

==== Doubles ====
Tournament	1994	...	1999	2000	2001	2002	2003	2004	2005	2006	2007	2008	2009	2010	2011	2012	2013	2014	2015	2016	2017	2018	2019	2020	2021	SR	W–L
Australian Open	A		3R	1R	A	QF	A	A	1R	A	A	QF	3R	2R	SF	2R	2R	SF	1R	A	3R	3R	3R	2R	A	0 / 16	28–15
French Open	2R		2R	2R	3R	1R	A	1R	3R	QF	3R	3R	3R	F	QF	QF	2R	QF	A	1R	1R	3R	QF	A	2R	0 / 21	36–20
Wimbledon	1R		1R	2R	A	2R	A	A	1R	QF	QF	3R	A	QF	W	2R	SF	1R	A	QF	SF	F	QF	NH	1R	1 / 18	39–17
US Open	A		2R	2R	3R	1R	A	A	1R	SF	SF	1R	A	3R	QF	QF	3R	QF	A	1R	1R	1R	2R	QF	2R	0 / 19	29–19
Win–loss	1–2		4–4	3–4	4–1	4–4	0–0	0–1	2–4	9–3	9–3	7–4	4–2	11–4	16–3	8–4	8–3	10–4	0–1	3–3	6–4	9–4	9–4	3–2	2–3	1 / 74	132–71

=== Mixed doubles ===
Tournament	2002	...	2005	2006	2007	2008	2009	2010	2011	2012	2013	2014	2015	2016	2017	2018	2019	2020	2021	SR	W–L
Australian Open	QF		A	A	A	QF	1R	1R	1R	1R	SF	2R	1R	A	A	2R	1R	1R	A	0 / 12	8–11
French Open	A		2R	1R	1R	SF	1R	A	2R	QF	1R	1R	A	A	1R	1R	1R	NH	A	0 / 12	7–12
Wimbledon	2R		2R	3R	3R	QF	A	A	2R	3R	QF	3R	A	A	2R	2R	SF	NH	SF	0 / 13	12–13
US Open	A		1R	F	2R	2R	A	F	A	F	QF	QF	A	A	2R	2R	QF	NH	A	0 / 11	22–11
Win–loss	3–2		1–3	5–3	2–3	7–3	0–2	4–2	1–3	7–4	6–4	4–4	0–1	0–0	1–3	2–4	5–4	0–1	1–1	0 / 48	49–47

Notes

- At the 2008 Australian Open, Peschke and Martin Damm withdrew before their quarterfinal match, this is not counted as a loss.
- At the 2008 Wimbledon Championships, Peschke and Pavel Vízner received a third-round walkover, this is not counted as a win.
- At the 2013 Australian Open, Peschke and Marcin Matkowski received a second-round walkover, this is not counted as a win.
- At the 2021 Wimbledon Championships, Peschke and Kevin Krawietz received second and third-round walkovers, these are not counted as wins.

Awards
Preceded by (Argentina) Gisela Dulko & (Italy) Flavia Pennetta	WTA Doubles Team of the Year (with (Slovenia) Katarina Srebotnik); 2011	Succeeded by (Italy) Sara Errani & (Italy) Roberta Vinci
Preceded by (Argentina) Gisela Dulko & (Italy) Flavia Pennetta	ITF World Champion (with (Slovenia) Katarina Srebotnik); 2011	Succeeded by (Italy) Sara Errani & (Italy) Roberta Vinci
