= 2006 US Open – Boys' singles =

Boys' singles
- 2006 US Open

Final
- Champion: (Czech Republic) Dušan Lojda
- Runner-up: (Canada) Peter Polansky
- Score: 7–6(4), 6–3

Events
Singles	men	women		boys	girls
Doubles	men	women	mixed	boys	girls
WC Singles	men	women	quad
WC Doubles	men	women	quad
Legends	men	women	mixed
- US Open

The United States Open Tennis Championships is a hardcourt tennis tournament held annually at Flushing Meadows, starting on the last Monday in August and lasting for two weeks. The tournament consists of five main championship events: men's and women's singles, men's and women's doubles, and mixed doubles, with additional tournaments for seniors, juniors, and wheelchair players.

In 2006, the boys' singles event was won by Dušan Lojda of the Czech Republic who beat Peter Polansky of Canada, 7–6(4), 6–3 in the final.

== Seeds ==
1. (Slovakia) Martin Kližan (second round)
2. (France) Jonathan Eysseric (quarterfinals)
3. (Brazil) Nicolas Santos (third round)
4. (United States) Donald Young (semifinals)
5. (Japan) Kei Nishikori (first round)
6. (India) Sanam Singh (first round)
7. (Romania) Petru-Alexandru Luncanu (first round)
8. (Russia) Artur Chernov (first round)
9. (Croatia) Luka Belić (semifinals)
10. (Czech Republic) Dušan Lojda (champion)
11. (Russia) Pavel Chekhov (quarterfinals)
12. (Czech Republic) Roman Jebavý (quarterfinals)
13. (United States) Kellen Damico (first round)
14. (Portugal) Pedro Sousa (first round)
15. (India) Jeevan Nedunchezhiyan (first round)
16. (Spain) Albert Ramos Viñolas (second round)

== Draw ==
Key

- Q = Qualifier
- WC = Wild card
- LL = Lucky loser
- Alt = Alternate
- ITF = ITF entry
- PR = Protected ranking
- SR = Special ranking
- SE = Special exempt
- JE = Junior exempt
- JR = Junior Accelerator Programme entrant
- CO = College Accelerator Programme entrant
- NG = Next Gen Accelerator Program entrant
- w/o = Walkover
- r = Retired
- d = Defaulted

=== Final eight ===
Quarterfinals
SE	(Canada) Peter Polansky	7	6
12	(Czech Republic) Roman Jebavý	6^{9}	1
4	(United States) Donald Young	7	6
11	(Russia) Pavel Chekhov	6^{1}	3
10	(Czech Republic) Dušan Lojda	6	6
Q	(Ukraine) Artem Smirnov	2	2
9	(Croatia) Luka Belić	6	6
2	(France) Jonathan Eysseric	4	4

Semifinals
SE	(Canada) Peter Polansky	6	6^{2}	6
4	(United States) Donald Young	3	7	3
10	(Czech Republic) Dušan Lojda	6	6
9	(Croatia) Luka Belić	3	3

Final
SE	(Canada) Peter Polansky	3	6^{4}
10	(Czech Republic) Dušan Lojda	6	7

=== Top half ===
==== Section 1 ====
First round
1	(Slovakia) Martin Kližan	6	7^{7}
WC	(United States) Bradley Klahn	1	6^{2}
(Hungary) Attila Balázs	1	2
SE	(Canada) Peter Polansky	6	6
(Poland) Marcin Gawron	6	5	6
(Tunisia) Wael Kilani	3	7	2
(Belgium) Ruben Bemelmans	7^{7}	3	2
16	(Spain) Albert Ramos Viñolas	6^{5}	6	6
12	(Czech Republic) Roman Jebavý	2	6	6
(Bolivia) José Roberto Velasco	6	1	2
(Greece) Paris Gemouchidis	6	1	6
(United States) Nathaniel Schnugg	4	6	3
Q	(Russia) Vladimir Zinyakov	6	6
WC	(United States) Rhyne Williams	3	2
(Paraguay) Daniel-Alejandro Lopez	6	6
5	(Japan) Kei Nishikori	3	2

Second round
1	(Slovakia) M Kližan	3	7^{7}	4
SE	(Canada) P Polansky	6	6^{3}	6
(Poland) M Gawron	6^{4}	6	6
16	(Spain) A Ramos Viñolas	7^{7}	4	2
12	(Czech Republic) R Jebavý	7^{8}	6
(Greece) P Gemouchidis	6^{6}	4
Q	(Russia) V Zinyakov	4	6^{8}
(Paraguay) D-A Lopez	6	7^{10}

Third round
SE	(Canada) P Polansky	6	5	6
(Poland) M Gawron	0	7	1
12	(Czech Republic) R Jebavý	6	6
(Paraguay) D-A Lopez	4	2

Quarterfinals
SE	(Canada) P Polansky	7^{11}	6
12	(Czech Republic) R Jebavý	6^{9}	1

==== Section 2 ====
First round
4	(United States) Donald Young	6	6
(Estonia) Jaak Põldma	1	1
(Brazil) Fernando Romboli	6	5	6
Q	(United States) Drew Daniel	4	7	4
WC	(United States) Michael McClune	6	6
(Chile) Ricardo Urzua-Rivera	1	4
(Australia) Greg Jones	7^{7}	6
14	(Portugal) Pedro Sousa	6^{4}	2
11	(Russia) Pavel Chekhov	3	7^{7}	6
Q	(United States) Mateusz Kecki	6	6^{3}	3
(Indonesia) Christopher Rungkat	7^{9}	2	7^{11}
WC	(United States) Austin Krajicek	6^{7}	6	6^{9}
WC	(United States) Marcus Fugate	4	7^{9}	3
(Croatia) Antonio Veić	6	6^{7}	6
Q	(Canada) Yoann Re	6	6
6	(India) Sanam Singh	1	1

Second round
4	(United States) D Young	7	6
(Brazil) F Romboli	5	3
WC	(United States) M McClune	1	2
(Australia) G Jones	6	6
11	(Russia) P Chekhov	7	6
(Indonesia) C Rungkat	5	1
(Croatia) A Veić	6	6^{5}	6
Q	(Canada) Y Re	2	7^{7}	2

Third round
4	(United States) D Young	6	6
(Australia) G Jones	3	4
11	(Russia) P Chekhov	6	6
(Croatia) A Veić	4	4

Quarterfinals
4	(United States) D Young	7^{7}	6
11	(Russia) P Chekhov	6^{1}	3

=== Bottom half ===
==== Section 3 ====
First round
7	(Romania) Petru-Alexandru Luncanu	5	6	5
WC	(United States) Chase Buchanan	7	2	7
(Venezuela) Roberto Maytín	6^{8}	3
(Madagascar) Lofo Ramiaramanana	7^{10}	6
(India) Rupesh Roy	6	5	0
(Portugal) Gastão Elias	4	7	6
(Russia) Danila Arsenov	3	3
10	(Czech Republic) Dušan Lojda	6	6
13	(United States) Kellen Damico	1	7	4
Q	(Ukraine) Artem Smirnov	6	5	6
(Slovakia) Andrej Martin	6^{0}	0
(United States) Dennis Lajola	7^{7}	6
Q	(United States) Dylin Arnould	1	0
(Italy) Matteo Trevisan	6	6
(Lebanon) Bassam Beidas	2	5
3	(Brazil) Nicolás Santos	6	7

Second round
WC	(United States) C Buchanan	4	3
(Madagascar) L Ramiaramanana	6	6
(Portugal) G Elias	4	2
10	(Czech Republic) D Lojda	6	6
Q	(Ukraine) A Smirnov	2	7^{7}	7
(United States) D Lajola	6	6^{1}	5
(Italy) M Trevisan	2	3
3	(Brazil) N Santos	6	6

Third round
(Madagascar) L Ramiaramanana	1	3
10	(Czech Republic) D Lojda	6	6
Q	(Ukraine) A Smirnov	6	3	6
3	(Brazil) N Santos	3	6	2

Quarterfinals
10	(Czech Republic) D Lojda	6	6
Q	(Ukraine) A Smirnov	2	2

==== Section 4 ====
First round
8	(Russia) Artur Chernov	6^{5}	2
(Estonia) Jürgen Zopp	7^{7}	6
(Italy) Thomas Fabbiano	6	4	6
Q	(United States) Jason Jung	4	6	4
(Chile) Hans Podlipnik	7	6
WC	(United States) Jarmere Jenkins	5	1
WC	(United States) Brennan Boyajian	3	2
9	(Croatia) Luka Belić	6	6
15	(India) Jeevan Nedunchezhiyan	1	0
(Czech Republic) Michal Konečný	6	6
Q	(Japan) Tatsuma Ito	6	6
(United States) Clint Bowles	3	3
(Spain) Roberto Bautista Agut	3	4
(Canada) Philip Bester	6	6
(United States) Jamie Hunt	6	3	2
2	(France) Jonathan Eysseric	4	6	6

Second round
(Estonia) J Zopp	0	2
(Italy) T Fabbiano	6	6
(Chile) H Podlipnik	2	2
9	(Croatia) L Belić	6	6
(Czech Republic) M Konečný	6	6
Q	(Japan) T Ito	1	4
(Canada) P Bester	3	6	4
2	(France) J Eysseric	6	2	6

Third round
(Italy) T Fabbiano	6^{4}	2
9	(Croatia) L Belic	7^{7}	6
(Czech Republic) M Konečný	3	5
2	(France) J Eysseric	6	7

Quarterfinals
9	(Croatia) L Belić	6	6
2	(France) J Eysseric	4	4
