= Nathaniel Schnugg =

American tennis player

- Country (sports): United States
- Born: October 5, 1988 (age 36); Medford, Oregon, U.S.
- Height: 6 ft 4 in (193 cm)
- Plays: Right-handed
- College: University of Georgia
- Prize money: $14,374

Singles
- Career record: 0–0
- Career titles: 0
- Highest ranking: No. 1149 (November 7, 2011)

Doubles
- Career record: 0–2
- Career titles: 0; 0 Challenger, 1 Futures
- Highest ranking: No. 990 (September 18, 2006)

Grand Slam doubles results
- US Open: 1R (2006, 2007)
- Last updated on: June 13, 2021.

Nathaniel Schnugg (born October 5, 1988), also known as "Nate", is an American tennis player.

Schnugg has a career high ATP singles ranking of World No. 1149, achieved on November 7, 2011. He also has a career high ATP doubles ranking of World No. 990, achieved on September 18, 2006.

Schnugg attended the University of Georgia where he majored in Pre-Med. He joined the Bulldogs university team and reached as high as number 8 in the ITA Collegiate Tennis Rankings in 2008, and was named as an All-American. He was recognized and named the SEC men's tennis athlete of the week at the end of January 2009.

Married his absolute rocket of a wife, Krista Schnugg 2019.

== Junior career ==
As a junior, Schnugg reached as high as junior World No. 24 in the rankings (attained on September 11, 2006). Excelling in doubles, he reached three junior grand slam finals winning two titles. At 2006 Australian Open he and compatriot Kellen Damico lost the boys' doubles final to Polish pair Błażej Koniusz and Grzegorz Panfil 6–7^{(5–7)}, 3–6. At the 2006 Wimbledon Championships, again with Kellen Damico, they won the boys' doubles title defeating Slovakian duo Martin Kližan and Andrej Martin 7–6^{(9–7)}, 6–2. At the 2006 US Open, with another compatriot Jamie Hunt, he won the boys' doubles title in an all American final defeating Austin Krajicek and Jarmere Jenkins 6–3, 6–3.

== Junior Grand Slam finals ==
=== Doubles: 3 (2 titles, 1 runner-up) ===
Result	Year	Tournament	Surface	Partner	Opponent	Score
Loss	2006	Australian Open	Hard	(United States) Kellen Damico	(Poland) Błażej Koniusz (Poland) Grzegorz Panfil	6–7^{(5–7)}, 3–6
Win	2006	Wimbledon	Grass	(United States) Kellen Damico	(Slovakia) Martin Kližan (Slovakia) Andrej Martin	7–6^{(9–7)}, 6–2
Win	2006	US Open	Hard	(United States) Jamie Hunt	(United States) Austin Krajicek (United States) Jarmere Jenkins	6–3, 6–3

== Professional career ==
Snugg made his debut on the ATP Tour at the 2006 US Open, where he and Kellen Damico were given a wild card entry into the main doubles draw. They would go on to lose to David Ferrer and Fernando Vicente 5–7, 2–6. The following year at the 2007 US Open he and Damico were again granted direct entry as a wild cards but lost in the first round 4–6, 2–6 to Jonas Björkman and Max Mirnyi.

Schnugg reached one career final on the ITF Futures tour, winning the doubles title at the Mexico F2 tournament in February 2006. Partnered with his older brother Scott Schnugg, the pair defeated Shane La Porte and Lazaro Navarro-Batles 7–6^{(7–2)}, 7–6^{(7–4)} in the finals to claim his only professional title.

== ATP Challenger and ITF Futures finals ==
=== Doubles: 1 (1–0) ===
Legend ATP Challenger (0–0) ITF Futures (1–0)	Finals by surface Hard (1–0) Clay (0–0) Grass (0–0) Carpet (0–0)

Result	W–L	Date	Tournament	Tier	Surface	Partner	Opponents	Score
Win	1-0	Feb 2006	Mexico F2, Mexico City	Futures	Hard	(United States) Scott Schnugg	(United States) Shane La Porte (Cuba) Lazaro Navarro-Batles	7–6^{(7–2)}, 7–6^{(7–4)}
