= Chelsey Gullickson =

American tennis player (born 1990)

- Country (sports): United States
- Residence: Palm Beach Gardens, Florida, U.S.
- Born: August 29, 1990 (age 35); Houston, Texas, U.S.
- Height: 5 ft 11 in (1.80 m)
- Plays: Right-handed (two-handed backhand)
- Prize money: $48,947

Singles
- Career record: 27–18
- Career titles: 2 ITF
- Highest ranking: No. 399 (June 9, 2008)

Grand Slam singles results
- US Open: 1R (2010)

Doubles
- Career record: 8–8
- Career titles: 0
- Highest ranking: No. 665 (July 7, 2008)

Grand Slam doubles results
- US Open: 2R (2010)

Chelsey Gullickson (born August 29, 1990) is an American former professional tennis player.

== Life and career ==
Her highest WTA singles ranking is 399, which she reached in June 2008. Her career-high in doubles is 665, which she reached in July 2008. She is the sister of former professional tennis player Carly Gullickson and daughter of former major league baseball pitcher Bill Gullickson.

Gullickson won the 2010 NCAA Women's Tennis Championship in singles for the University of Georgia. Although not having a WTA rank at the time, she received two wild cards for the 2010 US Open, where she drew the top seed Caroline Wozniacki in the first singles round and lost in straight sets. In doubles, she and her sister Carly won their first-round match against Sara Errani and Roberta Vinci, then lost to fourth seeds Květa Peschke and Katarina Srebotnik.

== Career statistics ==
=== ITF finals ===
$50,000 tournaments
$25,000 tournaments
$10,000 tournaments

==== Singles (2–0) ====
Outcome	No.	Date	Tournament	Surface	Opponent	Score
Winner	1.	18 May 2008	Raleigh, United States	Clay	(United States) Lauren Albanese	6–4, 2–6, 6–3
Winner	2.	16 September 2012	Redding, United States	Hard	(United States) Allie Will	6–3, 4–6, 6–2

==== Doubles (0–1) ====
Outcome	No.	Date	Tournament	Surface	Partner	Opponents	Score
Runner-up	1.	30 March 2008	Hammond, United States	Hard	(United States) Carly Gullickson	(United States) Raquel Kops-Jones (United States) Abigail Spears	5–7, 4–6
