= 2006 US Open – Women's doubles =

Women's doubles
- 2006 US Open

Final
- Champion: (France) Nathalie Dechy (Russia) Vera Zvonareva
- Runner-up: (Russia) Dinara Safina (Slovenia) Katarina Srebotnik
- Score: 7–6^{(7–5)}, 7-5

Details
- Draw: 64 (7 WC )
- Seeds: 16

Events
Singles	men	women		boys	girls
Doubles	men	women	mixed	boys	girls
WC Singles	men	women	quad
WC Doubles	men	women	quad
Legends	men	women	mixed
← 2005 ·	US Open	· 2007 →

Nathalie Dechy and Vera Zvonareva defeated Dinara Safina and Katarina Srebotnik in the final, 7–6^{(7–5)}, 7-5 to win the women's doubles title at the 2006 US Open.

Lisa Raymond and Samantha Stosur were the defending champions and first seed, but lost in the semifinals to Safina and Srebotnik.

Martina Navratilova made her final major appearance, marking the end of a 33-year career.

== Seeds ==
1. (United States) Lisa Raymond / (Australia) Samantha Stosur (semifinals)
2. (China) Yan Zi / (China) Zheng Jie (quarterfinals)
3. (Zimbabwe) Cara Black / (Australia) Rennae Stubbs (quarterfinals)
4. (Slovakia) Daniela Hantuchová / (Japan) Ai Sugiyama (second round)
5. (Germany) Anna-Lena Grönefeld / (United States) Meghann Shaughnessy (second round)
6. (Czech Republic) Květa Peschke / (Italy) Francesca Schiavone (semifinals)
7. (Spain) Virginia Ruano Pascual / (Argentina) Paola Suárez (quarterfinals)
8. (Russia) Dinara Safina / (Slovenia) Katarina Srebotnik (finalists)
9. ~~(Greece) Eleni Daniilidou / (Spain) Anabel Medina Garrigues~~ (withdrew from the tournament)
10. (United States) Martina Navratilova / (Russia) Nadia Petrova (quarterfinals)
11. (South Africa) Liezel Huber / (India) Sania Mirza (third round)
12. (Italy) Maria Elena Camerin / (Argentina) Gisela Dulko (first round)
13. (China) Li Ting / (China) Sun Tiantian (first round)
14. (France) Marion Bartoli / (Israel) Shahar Pe'er (second round)
15. (Slovakia) Janette Husárová / (Russia) Elena Likhovtseva (third round)
16. (France) Émilie Loit / (Australia) Nicole Pratt (first round)

== Draw ==
=== Key ===
- Q = Qualifier
- WC = Wild card
- LL = Lucky loser
- Alt = Alternate
- ITF = ITF entry
- PR = Protected ranking
- SR = Special ranking
- SE = Special exempt
- JE = Junior exempt
- JR = Junior Accelerator Programme entrant
- CO = College Accelerator Programme entrant
- NG = Next Gen Accelerator Program entrant
- w/o = Walkover
- r = Retired
- d = Defaulted

=== Finals ===
Quarterfinals
1	(United States) Lisa Raymond (Australia) Samantha Stosur	7	6
10	(United States) Martina Navratilova (Russia) Nadia Petrova	6^{1}	3
3	(Zimbabwe) Cara Black (Australia) Rennae Stubbs	4	6^{3}
8	(Russia) Dinara Safina (Slovenia) Katarina Srebotnik	6	7
7	(Spain) Virginia Ruano Pascual (Argentina) Paola Suárez	5	3
(France) Nathalie Dechy (Russia) Vera Zvonareva	7	6
6	(Czech Republic) Květa Peschke (Italy) Francesca Schiavone	7	6
2	(China) Yan Zi (China) Zheng Jie	5	4

Semifinals
1	(United States) Lisa Raymond (Australia) Samantha Stosur	4	6	3
8	(Russia) Dinara Safina (Slovenia) Katarina Srebotnik	6	1	6
(France) Nathalie Dechy (Russia) Vera Zvonareva	6	6
6	(Czech Republic) Květa Peschke (Italy) Francesca Schiavone	4	1

Final
8	(Russia) Dinara Safina (Slovenia) Katarina Srebotnik	6^{5}	5
(France) Nathalie Dechy (Russia) Vera Zvonareva	7	7

=== Top half ===
==== Section 1 ====
First round
1	(United States) L Raymond (Australia) S Stosur	2
(Switzerland) E Gagliardi (Italy) T Garbin	1	r
(Italy) M Santangelo (Italy) R Vinci	6	6
(Italy) R Oprandi (Germany) J Wöhr	1	3
(Russia) E Bychkova (Czech Republic) H Šromová	1	3
(Japan) S Asagoe (Japan) A Morigami	6	6
(Spain) C Martínez Granados (Venezuela) M Vento-Kabchi	3	1
14	(France) M Bartoli (Israel) S Pe'er	6	6
10	(United States) M Navratilova (Russia) N Petrova	6	6
WC	(United States) L Osterloh (United States) A Rolle	1	1
WC	(United States) L Burdette (United States) M Burdette	4	4
(Netherlands) M Krajicek (United States) C Morariu	6	6
(Ukraine) Y Beygelzimer (Russia) V Dushevina	4	2
(Serbia) A Ivanovic (Russia) M Kirilenko	6	6
(Bulgaria) T Pironkova (China) M Yuan	3	3
5	(Germany) A-L Grönefeld (United States) M Shaughnessy	6	6

Second round
1	(United States) L Raymond (Australia) S Stosur	6	6
(Italy) M Santangelo (Italy) R Vinci	1	3
(Japan) S Asagoe (Japan) A Morigami	4	7^{8}	6
14	(France) M Bartoli (Israel) S Pe'er	6	6^{6}	4
10	(United States) M Navratilova (Russia) N Petrova	6	6
(Netherlands) M Krajicek (United States) C Morariu	2	1
(Serbia) A Ivanovic (Russia) M Kirilenko	6	6^{5}	7
5	(Germany) A-L Grönefeld (United States) M Shaughnessy	3	7^{7}	5

Third round
1	(United States) L Raymond (Australia) S Stosur	6	6
(Japan) S Asagoe (Japan) A Morigami	3	4
10	(United States) M Navratilova (Russia) N Petrova	6	6^{1}	6
(Serbia) A Ivanovic (Russia) M Kirilenko	4	7^{7}	4

Quarterfinals
1	(United States) L Raymond (Australia) Stosur	7^{7}	6
10	(United States) M Navratilova (Russia) N Petrova	6^{1}	3

==== Section 2 ====
First round
3	(Zimbabwe) C Black (Australia) R Stubbs	6	6
(United States) J Jackson (Japan) A Nakamura	3	3
(Colombia) C Castaño (United States) J Craybas	7	6
(Russia) V Bardina (Latvia) L Dekmeijere	5	3
(Spain) L Domínguez Lino (Spain) M Sánchez Lorenzo	6^{1}	3
(Russia) A Rodionova (Romania) A Vanc	7^{7}	6
WC	(United States) J Kirkland (United States) L Lee-Waters	1	2
15	(Slovakia) J Husárová (Russia) E Likhovtseva	6	6
ALT	(France) A Rezaï (Ukraine) O Savchuk	1	0
(Serbia) J Janković (United States) B Mattek	6	6
(France) S Brémond (France) T Golovin	6	6
(Czech Republic) L Hradecká (Czech Republic) V Uhlířová	2	2
(Czech Republic) E Birnerová (Belarus) A Yakimova	6	4	6
WC	(United States) A Glatch (United States) A Spears	3	6	4
(Slovakia) J Gajdošová (Australia) B Stewart	5	1
8	(Russia) D Safina (Slovenia) K Srebotnik	7	6

Second round
3	(Zimbabwe) C Black (Australia) R Stubbs	6	4	6
(Colombia) C Castaño (United States) J Craybas	2	6	0
(Russia) A Rodionova (Romania) A Vanc	3	1
15	(Slovakia) J Husárová (Russia) E Likhovtseva	6	6
(Serbia) J Janković (United States) B Mattek	6	6
(France) S Brémond (France) T Golovin	3	2
(Czech Republic) E Birnerová (Belarus) A Yakimova	3	4
8	(Russia) D Safina (Slovenia) K Srebotnik	6	6

Third round
3	(Zimbabwe) C Black (Australia) R Stubbs	6	6
15	(Slovakia) J Husárová (Russia) E Likhovtseva	3	1
(Serbia) J Janković (United States) B Mattek	3	4
8	(Russia) D Safina (Slovenia) K Srebotnik	6	6

Quarterfinals
3	(Zimbabwe) C Black (Australia) R Stubbs	4	6^{3}
8	(Russia) D Safina (Slovenia) K Srebotnik	6	7^{7}

=== Bottom half ===
==== Section 3 ====
First round
7	(Spain) V Ruano Pascual (Argentina) P Suárez	6	6
(Croatia) I Lisjak (Czech Republic) L Šafářová	3	3
(United States) A Frazier (United States) V King	6	6
(Russia) A Jidkova (Israel) A Smashnova	2	3
(Russia) A Chakvetadze (Russia) E Vesnina	6	6
WC	(United States) J Hampton (United States) A Weinhold	2	2
(Finland) E Laine (Tunisia) S Sfar	3	6	7^{9}
12	(Italy) ME Camerin (Argentina) G Dulko	6	2	6^{7}
16	(France) É Loit (Australia) N Pratt	6^{3}	7^{11}	3
(United States) L Granville (United States) C Gullickson	7^{7}	6^{9}	6
ALT	(Hungary) M Czink (Italy) A Serra Zanetti	4	1
(Estonia) M Ani (United States) M Tu	6	6
(Estonia) K Kanepi (Czech Republic) G Navrátilová	5	6	3
(France) N Dechy (Russia) V Zvonareva	7	1	6
(Ukraine) Y Fedak (Ukraine) T Perebiynis	4	4
4	(Slovakia) D Hantuchová (Japan) A Sugiyama	6	6

Second round
7	(Spain) V Ruano Pascual (Argentina) P Suárez	6	6
(United States) A Frazier (United States) V King	4	3
(Russia) A Chakvetadze (Russia) E Vesnina	6	6
(Finland) E Laine (Tunisia) S Sfar	4	3
(United States) L Granville (United States) C Gullickson	4	2
(Estonia) M Ani (United States) M Tu	6	6
(France) N Dechy (Russia) V Zvonareva	3	6	6
4	(Slovakia) D Hantuchová (Japan) A Sugiyama	6	4	2

Third round
7	(Spain) V Ruano Pascual (Argentina) P Suárez	4	6	6
(Russia) A Chakvetadze (Russia) E Vesnina	6	4	4
(Estonia) M Ani (United States) M Tu	4	1
(France) N Dechy (Russia) V Zvonareva	6	6

Quarterfinals
7	(Spain) V Ruano Pascual (Argentina) P Suárez	5	3
(France) N Dechy (Russia) V Zvonareva	7	6

==== Section 4 ====
First round
6	(Czech Republic) K Peschke (Italy) F Schiavone	6	6
(Sweden) S Arvidsson (Germany) M Müller	0	0
(Ukraine) A Bondarenko (Ukraine) K Bondarenko	6	6
(Slovakia) M Suchá (Czech Republic) K Zakopalová	1	0
(Austria) S Bammer (Germany) J Schruff	5	2
(France) S Cohen-Aloro (Spain) MJ Martínez Sánchez	7	6
WC	(United States) A Haynes (United States) N Uberoi	4	0
11	(South Africa) L Huber (India) S Mirza	6	6
13	(China) T Li (China) T Sun	6	3	1
(United States) A Harkleroad (Russia) G Voskoboeva	4	6	6
ALT	(France) C Pin (Venezuela) M Sequera	6	6
WC	(United States) A Prousis (United States) A Yelsey	4	3
(Poland) M Domachowska (Croatia) J Kostanić	7	6
(China) N Li (China) S Peng	5	4
(Czech Republic) I Benešová (Czech Republic) B Strýcová	5	6	6^{3}
2	(China) Z Yan (China) J Zheng	7	2	7^{7}

Second round
6	(Czech Republic) K Peschke (Italy) F Schiavone	7	6
(Ukraine) A Bondarenko (Ukraine) K Bondarenko	5	1
(France) S Cohen-Aloro (Spain) MJ Martínez Sánchez	0	3
11	(South Africa) L Huber (India) S Mirza	6	6
(United States) A Harkleroad (Russia) G Voskoboeva	2
ALT	(France) C Pin (Venezuela) M Sequera	1	r
(Poland) M Domachowska (Croatia) J Kostanić	2	6	3
2	(China) Z Yan (China) J Zheng	6	2	6

Third round
6	(Czech Republic) K Peschke (Italy) F Schiavone	3	6	7
11	(South Africa) L Huber (India) S Mirza	6	3	5
(United States) A Harkleroad (Russia) G Voskoboeva	3	4
2	(China) Z Yan (China) J Zheng	6	6

Quarterfinals
6	(Czech Republic) K Peschke (Italy) F Schiavone	7	6
2	(China) Z Yan (China) J Zheng	5	4
