= 2006 US Open – Wheelchair men's singles =

Tennis tournament

Wheelchair men's singles
- 2006 US Open

Final
- Champion: (Netherlands) Robin Ammerlaan
- Runner-up: (France) Michaël Jérémiasz
- Score: 6–7^{(1–7)}, 6–3, 7–5

Events
Singles	men	women		boys	girls
Doubles	men	women	mixed	boys	girls
WC Singles	men	women	quad
WC Doubles	men	women	quad
Legends	men	women	mixed
← 2005 ·	US Open	· 2007 →

Defending champion Robin Ammerlaan defeated Michaël Jérémiasz in the final, 6–7^{(1–7)}, 6–3, 7–5 to win the men's singles wheelchair tennis title at the 2006 US Open.

== Draw ==
=== Key ===
- Q = Qualifier
- WC = Wild card
- LL = Lucky loser
- Alt = Alternate
- ITF = ITF entry
- PR = Protected ranking
- SR = Special ranking
- SE = Special exempt
- JE = Junior exempt
- JR = Junior Accelerator Programme entrant
- CO = College Accelerator Programme entrant
- NG = Next Gen Accelerator Program entrant
- w/o = Walkover
- r = Retired
- d = Defaulted

=== Finals ===
First round
(France) Michaël Jérémiasz	6	6
(Poland) Tadeusz Kruszelnicki	3	3
(Netherlands) Maikel Scheffers	3	1
(Japan) Shingo Kunieda	6	6
(Netherlands) Ronald Vink	6	6
(United States) Jon Rydberg	3	0
(United States) Larry Quintero	1	3
(Netherlands) Robin Ammerlaan	6	6

Semifinals
(France) Michaël Jérémiasz	4	7	6
(Japan) Shingo Kunieda	6	6^{3}	1
(Netherlands) Ronald Vink	2	4
(Netherlands) Robin Ammerlaan	6	6

Final
(France) Michaël Jérémiasz	7	3	5
(Netherlands) Robin Ammerlaan	6^{1}	6	7
