= 2006 US Open – Mixed doubles =

Mixed doubles
- 2006 US Open

Final
- Champion: (United States) Martina Navratilova (United States) Bob Bryan
- Runner-up: (Czech Republic) Květa Peschke (Czech Republic) Martin Damm
- Score: 6–2, 6–3

Details
- Draw: 32
- Seeds: 8

Events
Singles	men	women		boys	girls
Doubles	men	women	mixed	boys	girls
WC Singles	men	women	quad
WC Doubles	men	women	quad
Legends	men	women	mixed
- US Open

Martina Navratilova and Bob Bryan defeated Květa Peschke and Martin Damm in the final, 6–2, 6–3 to win the mixed doubles tennis title at the 2006 US Open. It was Navratilova's 59th and final major title, 32 years after her first (at the 1974 French Open), and marked her final professional appearance.

Daniela Hantuchová and Mahesh Bhupathi were the reigning champions, but neither participated in the mixed doubles tournament this year.

== Seeds ==
1. (United States) Lisa Raymond / (Sweden) Jonas Björkman (first round)
2. (Australia) Rennae Stubbs / (The Bahamas) Mark Knowles (first round)
3. (Australia) Samantha Stosur / (India) Leander Paes (first round)
4. (China) Yan Zi / (Australia) Todd Perry (second round)
5. (United States) Martina Navratilova / (United States) Bob Bryan (champions)
6. (Slovenia) Katarina Srebotnik / (Serbia) Nenad Zimonjić (second round)
7. (Russia) Elena Likhovtseva / (Canada) Daniel Nestor (first round)
8. (Zimbabwe) Cara Black / (Sweden) Simon Aspelin (first round)

== Draw ==
Key

- Q = Qualifier
- WC = Wild card
- LL = Lucky loser
- Alt = Alternate
- ITF = ITF entry
- PR = Protected ranking
- SR = Special ranking
- SE = Special exempt
- JE = Junior exempt
- JR = Junior Accelerator Programme entrant
- CO = College Accelerator Programme entrant
- NG = Next Gen Accelerator Program entrant
- w/o = Walkover
- r = Retired
- d = Defaulted

=== Finals ===
Semifinals
(Czech Republic) Květa Peschke (Czech Republic) Martin Damm	6	6
(Australia) Nicole Pratt (Australia) Paul Hanley	4	1
(United States) Meghann Shaughnessy (United States) Justin Gimelstob
5	(United States) Martina Navratilova (United States) Bob Bryan	w/o

Final
(Czech Republic) Květa Peschke (Czech Republic) Martin Damm	2	3
5	(United States) Martina Navratilova (United States) Bob Bryan	6	6

=== Top half ===
First round
1	(United States) L Raymond (Sweden) J Björkman	5	1
(Netherlands) M Krajicek (Czech Republic) L Dlouhý	7	6
(Spain) A Medina Garrigues (Argentina) S Prieto	7	7^{7}
(Russia) V Zvonareva (Israel) A Ram	5	6^{4}
WC	(United States) J Craybas (United States) S Jenkins	5	4
(Spain) V Ruano Pascual (Argentina) M García	7	6
(Czech Republic) K Peschke (Czech Republic) M Damm	7	7
7	(Russia) E Likhovtseva (Canada) D Nestor	5	5
3	(Australia) S Stosur (India) L Paes	6	2	[5]
WC	(Belarus) V Azarenka (Belarus) M Mirnyi	3	6	[10]
WC	(United States) S Perry (United States) A Delic	6^{3}	6	[3]
(Australia) N Pratt (Australia) P Hanley	7^{7}	3	[10]
WC	(United States) A Weinhold (United States) D Young	2	3
(France) N Dechy (France) F Santoro	6	6
WC	(United States) J Jackson (United States) J Levine	6	3	[10]
8	(Zimbabwe) C Black (Sweden) S Aspelin	3	6	[7]

Second round
(Netherlands) M Krajicek (Czech Republic) L Dlouhý	6^{5}	2
(Spain) A Medina Garrigues (Argentina) S Prieto	7^{7}	6
(Spain) V Ruano Pascual (Argentina) M García	3	5
(Czech Republic) K Peschke (Czech Republic) M Damm	6	7
WC	(Belarus) V Azarenka (Belarus) M Mirnyi	7	5	[10]
(Australia) N Pratt (Australia) P Hanley	5	7	[12]
(France) N Dechy (France) F Santoro	6	6
WC	(United States) J Jackson (United States) J Levine	2	2

Quarterfinals
(Spain) A Medina Garrigues (Argentina) S Prieto	4	2
(Czech Republic) K Peschke (Czech Republic) M Damm	6	6
(Australia) N Pratt (Australia) P Hanley	6	2	[11]
(France) N Dechy (France) F Santoro	2	6	[9]

Semifinals
(Czech Republic) K Peschke (Czech Republic) M Damm	6	6
(Australia) N Pratt (Australia) P Hanley	4	1

=== Bottom half ===
First round
6	(Slovenia) K Srebotnik (Serbia) N Zimonjić	6	3	[10]
(India) S Mirza (Czech Republic) P Vízner	2	6	[7]
(United States) M Shaughnessy (United States) J Gimelstob	6^{5}	6	[10]
(Italy) F Schiavone (United States) J Thomas	7^{7}	1	[5]
WC	(United States) V King (United States) V Spadea	6	6
(China) N Li (Czech Republic) C Suk	3	2
(South Africa) L Huber (Czech Republic) L Friedl	5	6	[7]
4	(China) Z Yan (Australia) T Perry	7	3	[10]
5	(United States) M Navratilova (United States) B Bryan	6^{6}	6	[10]
(United States) C Morariu (United States) M Bryan	7^{8}	4	[4]
Alt.	(Romania) A Vanc (Netherlands) R Wassen	4	6^{6}
Alt.	(China) T Sun (Austria) J Knowle	6	7^{8}
(Russia) A Rodionova (Zimbabwe) K Ullyett	4	6	[10]
Alt.	(Colombia) C Castaño (Poland) M Fyrstenberg	6	1	[8]
(Germany) A-L Grönefeld (Czech Republic) F Čermák	6	6
2	(Australia) R Stubbs (The Bahamas) M Knowles	4	4

Second round
6	(Slovenia) K Srebotnik (Serbia) N Zimonjić	6^{5}	6	[10]
(United States) M Shaughnessy (United States) J Gimelstob	7^{7}	3	[12]
WC	(United States) V King (United States) V Spadea	7^{7}
4	(China) Z Yan (Australia) T Perry	6^{3}	r
5	(United States) M Navratilova (United States) B Bryan	6	5	[10]
Alt.	(China) T Sun (Austria) J Knowle	1	7	[7]
(Russia) A Rodionova (Zimbabwe) K Ullyett	5	5
(Germany) A-L Grönefeld (Czech Republic) F Čermák	7	7

Quarterfinals
(United States) M Shaughnessy (United States) J Gimelstob	6	1	[10]
WC	(United States) V King (United States) V Spadea	4	6	[7]
5	(United States) M Navratilova (United States) B Bryan	6	6
(Germany) A-L Grönefeld (Czech Republic) F Čermák	3	4

Semifinals
(United States) M Shaughnessy (United States) J Gimelstob
5	(United States) M Navratilova (United States) B Bryan	w/o
