= 2006 US Open – Wheelchair women's singles =

Wheelchair women's singles
- 2006 US Open

Final
- Champion: (Netherlands) Esther Vergeer
- Runner-up: (Netherlands) Sharon Walraven
- Score: 6-1, 6-2

Events
| Singles | men | women | | boys | girls |
| Doubles | men | women | mixed | boys | girls |
| WC Singles | men | women | quad |
| WC Doubles | men | women | quad |
| Legends | men | women | mixed |
| ← 2005 · | US Open | · 2007 → |

Defending champion Esther Vergeer defeated Yana Buchina in the final, 6–1, 6–2 to win the women's singles wheelchair tennis title at the 2006 US Open.

== Draw ==
=== Key ===
- Q = Qualifier
- WC = Wild card
- LL = Lucky loser
- Alt = Alternate
- ITF = ITF entry
- PR = Protected ranking
- SR = Special ranking
- SE = Special exempt
- JE = Junior exempt
- JR = Junior Accelerator Programme entrant
- CO = College Accelerator Programme entrant
- NG = Next Gen Accelerator Program entrant
- w/o = Walkover
- r = Retired
- d = Defaulted

=== Finals ===
First round
(Netherlands) Esther Vergeer | 6 | 6
(United States) Kaitlyn Verfuerth | 1 | 1
(United States) Beth Arnoult-Ritthaler | 0 | 1
(Netherlands) Maaike Smit | 6 | 6
(Netherlands) Sharon Walraven | 6 | 6
(Netherlands) Jiske Griffioen | 4 | 2
(Netherlands) Korie Homan | 7 | 3 | 6
(France) Florence Gravellier | 5 | 6 | 3

Semifinals
(Netherlands) Esther Vergeer | 6 | 6
(Netherlands) Maaike Smit | 1 | 2
(Netherlands) Sharon Walraven | 7 | 5 | 6
(Netherlands) Korie Homan | 6^{1} | 7 | 1

Final
(Netherlands) Esther Vergeer | 6 | 6
(Netherlands) Sharon Walraven | 1 | 2
