= 2006 US Open – Wheelchair men's doubles =

Wheelchair men's doubles
- 2006 US Open

Final
- Champion: (Netherlands) Robin Ammerlaan (France) Michaël Jérémiasz
- Runner-up: (Japan) Shingo Kunieda (Poland) Tadeusz Kruszelnicki
- Score: 7–6^{(7–2)}, 6–1

Events
Singles	men	women		boys	girls
Doubles	men	women	mixed	boys	girls
WC Singles	men	women	quad
WC Doubles	men	women	quad
Legends	men	women	mixed
← 2005 ·	US Open	· 2007 →

Defending champions Robin Ammerlaan and Michaël Jérémiasz defeated Shingo Kunieda and Tadeusz Kruszelnicki in the final, 7–6^{(7–2)}, 6–1 to win the men's doubles wheelchair tennis title at the 2006 US Open.

== Seeds ==
1. (Netherlands) Robin Ammerlaan / (France) Michaël Jérémiasz
2. (Japan) Shingo Kunieda / (Poland) Tadeusz Kruszelnicki

== Draw ==
=== Key ===
- Q = Qualifier
- WC = Wild card
- LL = Lucky loser
- Alt = Alternate
- ITF = ITF entry
- PR = Protected ranking
- SR = Special ranking
- SE = Special exempt
- JE = Junior exempt
- JR = Junior Accelerator Programme entrant
- CO = College Accelerator Programme entrant
- NG = Next Gen Accelerator Program entrant
- w/o = Walkover
- r = Retired
- d = Defaulted

=== Finals ===
First round
1	(Netherlands) Robin Ammerlaan (France) Michaël Jérémiasz	3	7	6
(Netherlands) Maikel Scheffers (Netherlands) Ronald Vink	6	5	1
2	(Japan) Shingo Kunieda (Poland) Tadeusz Kruszelnicki	6	6
(United States) Larry Quintero (United States) Jon Rydberg	2	2

Finals
1	(Netherlands) Robin Ammerlaan (France) Michaël Jérémiasz	7^{7}	6
2	(Japan) Shingo Kunieda (Poland) Tadeusz Kruszelnicki	6^{2}	1
