= Kristy Frilling =

American tennis player

- Full name: Kristy Frilling Skelly
- Country (sports): United States
- Born: January 8, 1990 (age 36)
- Height: 5 ft 9 in (175 cm)
- Plays: Left-handed
- Prize money: $11,903

Singles
- Career record: 25–25
- Career titles: 0
- Highest ranking: No. 679 (May 12, 2008)

Doubles
- Career record: 33–18
- Career titles: 5 ITF
- Highest ranking: No. 230 (September 15, 2008)

Kristy Frilling Skelly (born January 8, 1990) is an American former professional tennis player.

A left-handed player from Sidney, Ohio, Frilling was a junior doubles semifinalist at the 2007 US Open. Frilling, who is of Korean descent on her mother's side, was a five-time All-American in varsity tennis at Notre Dame University, amassing 235 combined wins. She graduated from Notre Dame in 2012 and then spent a year and a half competing on the professional tour.

Frilling won five doubles titles on the ITF Women's Circuit, including a $50,000 tournament at Indian Harbour Beach. In her only WTA Tour main-draw appearance, at Cincinnati in 2008, she and partner Madison Brengle won their way through to the semifinals of the doubles. She retired with a career-high singles ranking of 679 and best doubles ranking of 230 in the world.

== ITF finals ==
$50,000 tournaments
$25,000 tournaments
$10,000 tournaments

=== Doubles: 5 (5 titles) ===
Result	No.	Date	Tournament	Surface	Partner	Opponents	Score
Win	1.	October 28, 2007	ITF Augusta, United States	Hard	(United States) Madison Brengle	(Russia) Angelina Gabueva (Russia) Alisa Kleybanova	6–3, 6–3
Win	2.	May 11, 2008	ITF Indian Harbour Beach, United States	Clay	(United States) Madison Brengle	(United States) Raquel Kops-Jones (United States) Abigail Spears	2–6, 6–4, [10–7]
Win	3.	July 18, 2010	ITF Atlanta, United States	Hard	(Israel) Julia Glushko	(United States) Irina Falconi (United States) Maria Sanchez	6–2, 2–6, [10–7]
Win	4.	May 26, 2013	ITF Sumter, United States	Hard	(United States) Alexandra Mueller	(United States) Jamie Loeb (United States) Sanaz Marand	6–4, 6–3
Win	5.	June 2, 2013	ITF Hilton Head, United States	Hard	(United States) Alexandra Mueller	(United States) Hayley Carter (United States) Josie Kuhlman	6–3, 6–4
