= Lindsay Burdette =

American tennis player

- Country (sports): United States
- Born: February 26, 1988 (age 37) Macon, Georgia, U.S.
- Height: 5 ft 8 in (173 cm)
- Plays: Right-handed
- Prize money: $13,474

Singles
- Career record: 1–8
- Highest ranking: No. 999 (October 27, 2003)

Doubles
- Career record: 5–9
- Highest ranking: No. 1026 (November 16, 2009)

Grand Slam doubles results
- US Open: 1R (2006, 2010)

Lindsay Burdette (born February 26, 1988) is an American former professional tennis player.

Burdette, the middle sister of tennis players Erin and Mallory, was born in Macon, Georgia. She only featured in the occasional professional tournament, but appeared twice in the US Open doubles main draw, partnering sister Mallory in 2006 and college teammate Hilary Barte in 2010.

While playing for the Stanford Cardinal she formed a successful doubles partnership with Hilary Barte, which earned them the 2010 NCAA Division I doubles championship, following a runner-up finish the previous season.
