= 2006 US Open – Boys' doubles =

Boys' doubles
- 2006 US Open

Final
- Champion: (United States) Jamie Hunt (United States) Nathaniel Schnugg
- Runner-up: (United States) Jarmere Jenkins (United States) Austin Krajicek
- Score: 6–3, 6–3

Events
| Singles | men | women | | boys | girls |
| Doubles | men | women | mixed | boys | girls |
| WC Singles | men | women | quad |
| WC Doubles | men | women | quad |
| Legends | men | women | mixed |
- US Open

The 2006 US Open boys' doubles was an event that was won by American pair Jamie Hunt and Nathaniel Schnugg.

== Seeds ==
1. (Czech Republic) Roman Jebavý / (Slovakia) Martin Kližan
2. (Russia) Pavel Chekhov / (Romania) Petru-Alexandru Luncanu
3. (India) Jeevan Nedunchezhiyan / (India) Sanam Singh
4. (Canada) Philip Bester / (France) Jonathan Eysseric
5. (Croatia) Luka Belić / (Croatia) Antonio Veić
6. (United States) Dennis Lajola / (United States) Donald Young
7. (Czech Republic) Michal Konečný / (Slovakia) Andrej Martin
8. (Belgium) Ruben Bemelmans / (Estonia) Jaak Põldma

== Draw ==
Key

- Q = Qualifier
- WC = Wild card
- LL = Lucky loser
- Alt = Alternate
- ITF = ITF entry
- PR = Protected ranking
- SR = Special ranking
- SE = Special exempt
- JE = Junior exempt
- JR = Junior Accelerator Programme entrant
- CO = College Accelerator Programme entrant
- NG = Next Gen Accelerator Program entrant
- w/o = Walkover
- r = Retired
- d = Defaulted

=== Finals ===
Semifinals
8 | (Belgium) Ruben Bemelmans (Estonia) Jaak Põldma | 3 | 5
WC | (United States) Jarmere Jenkins (United States) Austin Krajicek | 6 | 7
(Paraguay) Daniel-Alejandro Lopez (Italy) Matteo Trevisan | 2 | 6 | 2
(United States) Jamie Hunt (United States) Nathaniel Schnugg | 6 | 4 | 6

Final
WC | (United States) Jenkins (United States) Krajicek | 3 | 3
(United States) Hunt (United States) Schnugg | 6 | 6

=== Top half ===
First round
1 | (Czech Republic) Roman Jebavý (Slovakia) Martin Kližan | 7 | 4 | 6^{2}
(Russia) Danila Arsenov (Russia) Artur Chernov | 5 | 6 | 7^{7}
ALT | (Ecuador) Iván Endara (Chile) Ricardo Urzua-Rivera | 4 | 6 | 1
(Lebanon) Bassam Beidas (United States) Mateusz Kecki | 6 | 3 | 6
(Lithuania) Ričardas Berankis (Indonesia) Christopher Rungkat | 6 | 6
(Tunisia) Wael Kilani (Madagascar) Lofo Ramiaramanana | 4 | 4
(Hungary) Attila Balázs (Canada) Yoann Re | 6^{5} | 5
8 | (Belgium) Ruben Bemelmans (Estonia) Jaak Põldma | 7^{7} | 7
3 | (India) Jeevan Nedunchezhiyan (India) Sanam Singh | 3 | 4
(Australia) Greg Jones (Chile) Hans Podlipnik | 6 | 6
WC | (United States) Jarmere Jenkins (United States) Austin Krajicek | 3 | 6 | 7^{7}
(Japan) Hiroki Moriya (Canada) Peter Polansky | 6 | 2 | 6^{3}
WC | (United States) Chase Buchanan (United States) Marcus Fugate | 2 | 2
(Venezuela) Roberto Maytín (India) Rupesh Roy | 6 | 6
(Japan) Tatsuma Ito (Russia) Vladimir Zinyakov | w/o
6 | (United States) Dennis Lajola (United States) Donald Young

Second round
(Russia) Arsenov (Russia) Chernov | 4 | 6 | 7
(Lebanon) Beidas (United States) Kecki | 6 | 3 | 5
(Lithuania) Berankis (Indonesia) Rungkat | 1 | 1
8 | (Belgium) Bemelmans (Estonia) Põldma | 6 | 6
(Australia) Jones (Chile) Podlipnik | 6 | 5 | 6^{4}
WC | (United States) Jenkins (United States) Krajicek | 4 | 7 | 7^{7}
(Venezuela) Maytín (India) Roy | 6 | 6
(Japan) Ito (Russia) Zinyakov | 4 | 4

Quarterfinals
(Russia) Arsenov (Russia) Chernov | 4 | 3
8 | (Belgium) Bemelmans (Estonia) Põldma | 6 | 6
WC | (United States) Jenkins (United States) Krajicek | 6^{6} | 6 | 7^{7}
(Venezuela) Maytín (India) Roy | 7^{8} | 4 | 6^{5}

Semifinals
8 | (Belgium) Bemelmans (Estonia) Põldma | 3 | 5
WC | (United States) Jenkins (United States) Krajicek | 6 | 7

=== Bottom half ===
First round
5 | (Croatia) Luka Belić (Croatia) Antonio Veić | 6 | 1 | 6
(United States) Clint Bowles (United States) Rhyne Williams | 4 | 6 | 4
(Poland) Marcin Gawron (Czech Republic) Dušan Lojda | 7 | 6
(Ukraine) Artem Smirnov (Estonia) Jürgen Zopp | 5 | 1
(Paraguay) Daniel-Alejandro Lopez (Italy) Matteo Trevisan | 7 | 7
(United States) Boyajian Brennan (United States) Daniel Drew | 5 | 5
(Chile) Ricardo Urzua (Bolivia) Jose Roberto Velasco | 3 | 3
4 | (Canada) Philip Bester (France) Jonathan Eysseric | 6 | 6
7 | (Czech Republic) Michal Konecny (Slovakia) Andrej Martin | 6 | 6
(Portugal) Gastão Elias (Portugal) Pedro Sousa | 4 | 2
(Italy) Thomas Fabbiano (Greece) Paris Gemouchidis | 6^{1} | 6 | 3
(United States) Jamie Hunt (United States) Nathaniel Schnugg | 7^{7} | 3 | 6
(Brazil) Fernando Romboli (Brazil) Nicolas Santos | 6 | 1 | 6
WC | (United States) Adam El Mihdawy (United States) Bradley Klahn | 3 | 6 | 3
(Spain) Roberto Bautista (Spain) Albert Ramos Viñolas | 2 | 4
2 | (Russia) Pavel Chekhov (Romania) Petru-Alexandru Luncanu | 6 | 6

Second round
5 | (Croatia) Belić (Croatia) Veić | 6 | 3 | 7^{7}
(Poland) Gawron (Czech Republic) Lojda | 3 | 6 | 6^{4}
(Paraguay) Lopez (Italy) Trevisan | 2 | 6 | 6
4 | (Canada) Bester (France) Eysseric | 6 | 3 | 4
7 | (Czech Republic) Konecny (Slovakia) Martin | 6^{4} | 6 | 4
(United States) Hunt (United States) Schnugg | 7^{7} | 4 | 6
(Brazil) Romboli (Brazil) Santos | 3 | 4
2 | (Russia) Chekhov (Romania) Luncanu | 6 | 6

Quarterfinals
5 | (Croatia) Belic (Croatia) Veić | 3 | 2
(Paraguay) Lopez (Italy) Trevisan | 6 | 6
(United States) Hunt (United States) Schnugg | 2 | 7^{7} | 6
2 | (Russia) Chekhov (Romania) Luncanu | 6 | 6^{4} | 4

Semifinals
(Paraguay) Lopez (Italy) Trevisan | 2 | 6 | 2
(United States) Hunt (United States) Schnugg | 6 | 4 | 6
