= 2006 US Open (tennis) =

- Date: August 28 – September 10
- Edition: 126th
- Category: Grand Slam (ITF)
- Surface: Hardcourt
- Location: New York City, U.S.
- Venue: USTA Billie Jean King National Tennis Center

Champions

Men's singles
- (Switzerland) Roger Federer

Women's singles
- (Russia) Maria Sharapova

Men's doubles
- (Czech Republic) Martin Damm / (India) Leander Paes

Women's doubles
- (France) Nathalie Dechy / (Russia) Vera Zvonareva

Mixed doubles
- (United States) Bob Bryan / (United States) Martina Navratilova

Wheelchair men's singles
- (Netherlands) Robin Ammerlaan

Wheelchair women's singles
- (Netherlands) Esther Vergeer

Wheelchair men's doubles
- (Netherlands) Robin Ammerlaan / (France) Michaël Jérémiasz

Wheelchair women's doubles
- (Netherlands) Jiske Griffioen / (Netherlands) Esther Vergeer

Boys' singles
- (Czech Republic) Dušan Lojda

Girls' singles
- (Russia) Anastasia Pavlyuchenkova

Boys' doubles
- (United States) Jamie Hunt / (United States) Nathaniel Schnugg

Girls' doubles
- (Romania) Mihaela Buzărnescu / (Romania) Ioana Raluca Olaru
← 2005 ·	US Open	· 2007 →

The 2006 US Open began August 28 and finished on September 10, 2006.

Roger Federer was successful in defending his 2005 title, defeating 2003 champion Andy Roddick in the final. Kim Clijsters was unable to defend her title due to injury. 19-year-old Maria Sharapova won her second Grand Slam title, defeating Justine Henin-Hardenne in the final. It was Henin-Hardenne's third Grand Slam final loss of 2006, having lost the Australian Open and Wimbledon finals earlier in the year.

== Seniors ==
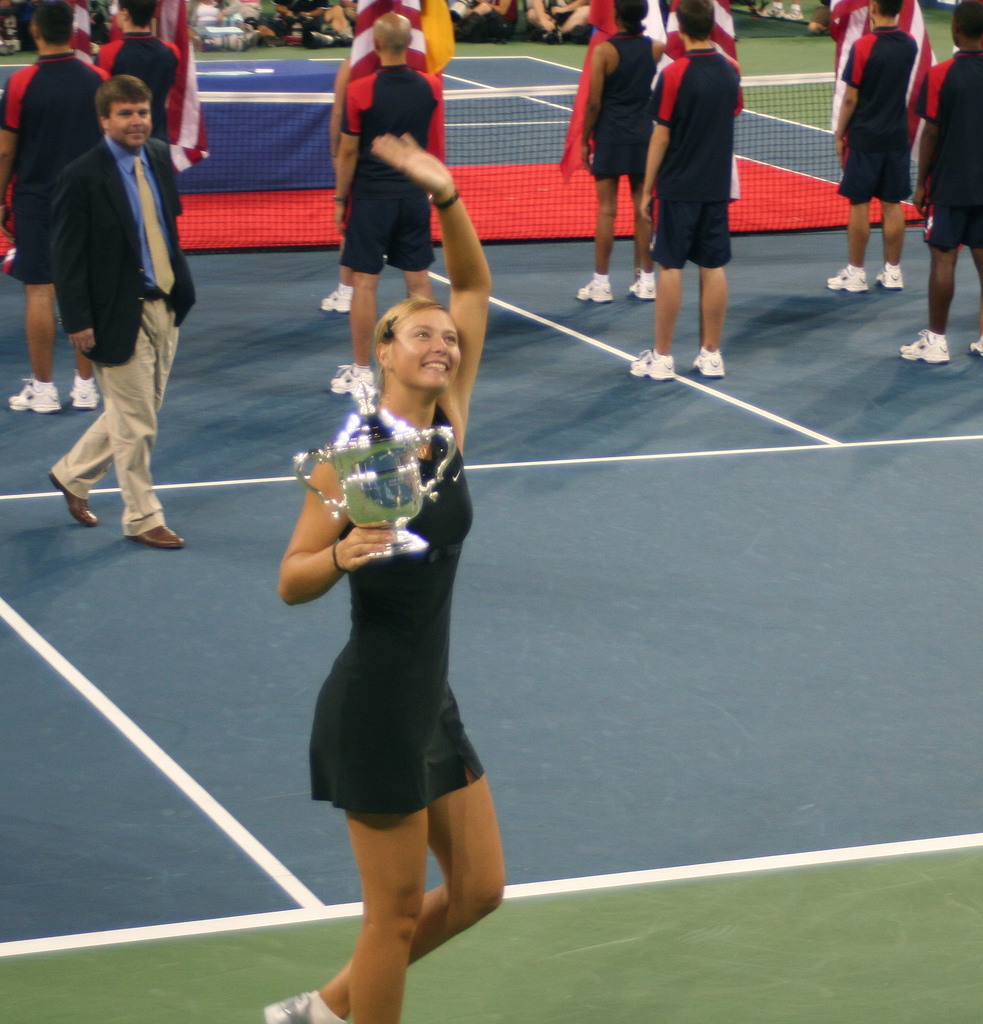
Women's singles champion Maria Sharapova. This was her second Major title.

=== Men's singles ===
(Switzerland) Roger Federer defeated (United States) Andy Roddick, 6–2, 4–6, 7–5, 6–1

- It was Federer's 8th title of the year, and his 41st overall. It was his 9th career Grand Slam title, and his 3rd (consecutive) US Open title.

=== Women's singles ===
(Russia) Maria Sharapova defeated (Belgium) Justine Henin-Hardenne, 6–4, 6–4

- It was Sharapova's 3rd title of the year, and her 13th overall. It was her 2nd career Grand Slam title, and her 1st US Open title.

=== Men's doubles ===
(Czech Republic) Martin Damm / (India) Leander Paes defeated (Sweden) Jonas Björkman / (Belarus) Max Mirnyi, 6–7^{(5–7)}, 6–4, 6–3

=== Women's doubles ===
(France) Nathalie Dechy / (Russia) Vera Zvonareva defeated (Russia) Dinara Safina / (Slovenia) Katarina Srebotnik, 7–6^{(7–5)}, 7–5

=== Mixed doubles ===
(United States) Martina Navratilova / (United States) Bob Bryan defeated (Czech Republic) Květa Peschke / (Czech Republic) Martin Damm, 6–2, 6–3

== Juniors ==
=== Boys' singles ===
(Czech Republic) Dušan Lojda defeated (Canada) Peter Polansky 7-6^{(7–4)}, 6-3

=== Girls' singles ===
(Russia) Anastasia Pavlyuchenkova defeated (Austria) Tamira Paszek 3–6, 6–4, 7–5

=== Boys' doubles ===
(United States) Jamie Hunt / (United States) Nathaniel Schnugg defeated (United States) Jarmere Jenkins/ (United States) Austin Krajicek 6–3, 6-3

=== Girls' doubles ===
(Romania) Mihaela Buzărnescu / (Romania) Ioana Raluca Olaru defeated (Canada) Sharon Fichman/ (Russia) Anastasia Pavlyuchenkova 7–5, 6-2

== Wheelchair ==
=== Men's wheelchair singles ===
(Netherlands) Robin Ammerlaan defeated (France) Michaël Jérémiasz 6-7^{(1–7)}, 6–3, 7-5

=== Women's wheelchair singles ===
(Netherlands) Esther Vergeer defeated (Netherlands) Sharon Walraven 6–1, 6-2

=== Men's wheelchair doubles ===
(Netherlands) Robin Ammerlaan / (France) Michaël Jérémiasz defeated (Japan) Shingo Kunieda / (Poland) Tadeusz Kruszelnicki 7-6^{(7–2)}, 6-1

=== Women's wheelchair doubles ===
(Netherlands) Jiske Griffioen / (Netherlands) Esther Vergeer defeated (Netherlands) Korie Homan / (Netherlands) Maaike Smit 6–4, 6-4

== Seeds ==
=== Men's singles ===
1. Roger Federer, Switzerland (champion)
2. Rafael Nadal, Spain (quarterfinals)
3. Ivan Ljubičić, Croatia (first round)
4. David Nalbandian, Argentina (second round)
5. (United States) James Blake, U.S. (quarterfinals)
6. Tommy Robredo, Spain (fourth round)
7. Nikolay Davydenko, Russia (semifinals)
8. Marcos Baghdatis, Cyprus (second round)
9. (United States) Andy Roddick, U.S. (finalist)
10. Fernando González, Chile (third round)
11. David Ferrer, Spain (third round)
12. Tomáš Berdych, Czech Republic (fourth round)
13. Jarkko Nieminen, Finland (first round)
14. Tommy Haas, Germany (quarterfinals)
15. Lleyton Hewitt, Australia (quarterfinals)
16. Juan Carlos Ferrero, Spain (second round)
17. (United Kingdom) Andy Murray, Great Britain (fourth round)
18. (United States) Robby Ginepri, U.S. (third round)
19. Dominik Hrbatý, Slovakia (first round)
20. Novak Djokovic, Serbia (third round)
21. Gastón Gaudio, Argentina (third round)
22. Fernando Verdasco, Spain (third round)
23. Dmitry Tursunov, Russia (third round)
24. José Acasuso, Argentina (first round)
25. Richard Gasquet, France (fourth round)
26. Olivier Rochus, Belgium (third round)
27. Gaël Monfils, France (second round)
28. Agustín Calleri, Argentina (first round)
29. Jonas Björkman, Sweden (second round)
30. Sébastien Grosjean, France (second round)
31. Juan Ignacio Chela, Argentina (first round)
32. Kristof Vliegen, Belgium (first round)

==== Top 10 elimination ====
Key / Legend
SF	Semifinal round
QF	Quarterfinal round
R	Round

Seed	Player		Player	Round
1	(France) Amélie Mauresmo	lost to	(Russia) Maria Sharapova [3]	SF
2	(Belgium) Justine Henin-Hardenne	lost to	(Russia) Maria Sharapova [3]	Final
3	(Russia) Maria Sharapova	defeated	(Belgium) Henin-Hardenne [2]	Final
4	(Russia) Elena Dementieva	lost to	(Serbia) Jelena Janković [19]	QF
5	(Russia) Nadia Petrova	lost to	(France) Tatiana Golovin [27]	R3
6	(Russia) Svetlana Kuznetsova	lost to	(Serbia) Jelena Janković [19]	R4
7	(Switzerland) Patty Schnyder	lost to	(United States) Lindsay Davenport [10]	R4
8	(Switzerland) Martina Hingis	lost to	(France) Virginie Razzano	R2
9	(Czech Republic) Nicole Vaidišová	lost to	(Serbia) Jelena Janković [19]	R3
10	(United States) Lindsay Davenport	lost to	(Belgium) Henin-Hardenne [2]	QF

== Withdrawn players ==
Men's singles

- (Croatia) Mario Ančić → replaced by (Brazil) Flávio Saretta
- (Russia) Igor Andreev → replaced by (Czech Republic) Jan Hernych
- (Sweden) Joachim Johansson → replaced by (Paraguay) Ramón Delgado
- (Germany) Nicolas Kiefer → replaced by (Germany) Michael Berrer
- (Czech Republic) Radek Štěpánek → replaced by (France) Olivier Patience

Women's singles

- (Russia) Elena Bovina → replaced by (Spain) Conchita Martínez Granados
- (Belgium) Kim Clijsters → replaced by (France) Virginie Razzano
- (Italy) Flavia Pennetta → replaced by (Australia) Nicole Pratt
- (United States) Venus Williams → replaced by (Spain) María José Martínez Sánchez

== Player of the day ==
- Day 1 – (United States) Lindsay Davenport
- Day 2 – No competition due to the rain.
- Day 3 – (Argentina) David Nalbandian
- Day 4 – (United States) Andre Agassi
- Day 5 – (United States) Martina Navratilova
- Day 6 – No competition due to the rain.
- Day 7 – (United States) Serena Williams
- Day 8 – (Serbia) Jelena Janković
- Day 9 – No competition due to the rain.
- Day 10 – (Germany) Tommy Haas
- Day 11 – (Russia) Nikolay Davydenko
- Day 12 – (Russia) Maria Sharapova
- Day 13 – (United States) Andy Roddick
- Day 14 – (Switzerland) Roger Federer

Preceded by 2006 Wimbledon Championships	Grand Slams	Succeeded by 2007 Australian Open
