= 2006 US Open – Men's doubles =

Men's doubles
- 2006 US Open

Final
- Champion: (Czech Republic) Martin Damm (India) Leander Paes
- Runner-up: (Sweden) Jonas Björkman (Belarus) Max Mirnyi
- Score: 6–7^{(5–7)}, 6–4, 6–3

Details
- Draw: 64
- Seeds: 16

Events
Singles	men	women		boys	girls
Doubles	men	women	mixed	boys	girls
WC Singles	men	women	quad
WC Doubles	men	women	quad
Legends	men	women	mixed
- US Open

For the 2006 US Open tennis tournament series, Bob and Mike Bryan were the defending champions, but lost in the third round to Leoš Friedl and Mikhail Youzhny.

Martin Damm and Leander Paes won the title, defeating Jonas Björkman and Max Mirnyi in the final, 6–7^{(5–7)}, 6–4, 6–3.

== Seeds ==
1. (United States) Bob Bryan / (United States) Mike Bryan (third round)
2. (Sweden) Jonas Björkman / (Belarus) Max Mirnyi (final)
3. (The Bahamas) Mark Knowles / (Canada) Daniel Nestor (third round)
4. (Australia) Paul Hanley / (Zimbabwe) Kevin Ullyett (semifinals)
5. (France) Fabrice Santoro / (Serbia) Nenad Zimonjić (quarterfinals)
6. (Czech Republic) Martin Damm / (India) Leander Paes (champions)
7. (Israel) Jonathan Erlich / (Israel) Andy Ram (third round)
8. (Sweden) Simon Aspelin / (Australia) Todd Perry (second round)
9. (Czech Republic) Lukáš Dlouhý / (Czech Republic) Pavel Vízner (second round)
10. (Poland) Mariusz Fyrstenberg / (Poland) Marcin Matkowski (third round)
11. (Austria) Julian Knowle / (Austria) Jürgen Melzer (second round)
12. (Argentina) José Acasuso / (Argentina) Sebastián Prieto (first round)
13. (Czech Republic) František Čermák / (Czech Republic) Jaroslav Levinský (second round)
14. (Australia) Wayne Arthurs / (United States) Justin Gimelstob (second round)
15. (Austria) Oliver Marach / (Czech Republic) Cyril Suk (first round)
16. (Germany) Michael Kohlmann / (Germany) Alexander Waske (third round)

== Draw ==
Key

- Q = Qualifier
- WC = Wild card
- LL = Lucky loser
- Alt = Alternate
- ITF = ITF entry
- PR = Protected ranking
- SR = Special ranking
- SE = Special exempt
- JE = Junior exempt
- JR = Junior Accelerator Programme entrant
- CO = College Accelerator Programme entrant
- NG = Next Gen Accelerator Program entrant
- w/o = Walkover
- r = Retired
- d = Defaulted

=== Finals ===
Quarterfinals
(Czech Republic) Leoš Friedl (Russia) Mikhail Youzhny	4	6	1
6	(Czech Republic) Martin Damm (India) Leander Paes	6	4	6
3	(Australia) Paul Hanley (Zimbabwe) Kevin Ullyett	3	6	6
5	(France) Fabrice Santoro (Serbia) Nenad Zimonjić	6	3	4
(Australia) Ashley Fisher (United States) Tripp Phillips	7	6
(United States) Paul Goldstein (United States) Jim Thomas	5	4
(France) Arnaud Clément (France) Michaël Llodra	6^{8}	7	2
2	(Sweden) Jonas Björkman (Belarus) Max Mirnyi	7	6^{6}	6

Semifinals
6	(Czech Republic) Martin Damm (India) Leander Paes	6^{1}	7	7
3	(Australia) Paul Hanley (Zimbabwe) Kevin Ullyett	7	6^{7}	5
(Australia) Ashley Fisher (United States) Tripp Phillips	1	4
2	(Sweden) Jonas Björkman (Belarus) Max Mirnyi	6	6

Final
6	(Czech Republic) Martin Damm (India) Leander Paes	6^{5}	6	6
2	(Sweden) Jonas Björkman (Belarus) Max Mirnyi	7	4	3

=== Top half ===
==== Section 1 ====
First round
1	(United States) B Bryan (United States) M Bryan	6	6
(Germany) P Kohlschreiber (Italy) A Seppi	1	2
(Serbia) N Djokovic (Chinese Taipei) Y-T Wang	4	2
(Sweden) T Johansson (Sweden) R Lindstedt	6	6
(India) M Bhupathi (Belgium) X Malisse	4	4
(Czech Republic) L Friedl (Russia) M Youzhny	6	6
WC	(United States) A Kuznetsov (United States) S Oudsema	6^{6}	6^{5}
13	(Czech Republic) F Čermák (Czech Republic) J Levinský	7^{8}	7^{7}
11	(Austria) J Knowle (Austria) J Melzer	6	6
(Slovakia) D Hrbatý (Slovakia) M Mertiňák	2	1
ALT	(United States) R Ginepri (United States) R Kendrick	6	4	1
(Finland) J Nieminen (United States) G Oliver	4	6	6
(Austria) A Peya (Germany) B Phau	7	6
WC	(United States) P Simmonds (United States) J Witten	5	4
(Czech Republic) P Pála (Czech Republic) R Vik	1	2
6	(Czech Republic) M Damm (India) L Paes	6	6

Second round
1	(United States) B Bryan (United States) M Bryan	6	6
(Sweden) T Johansson (Sweden) R Lindstedt	2	2
(Czech Republic) L Friedl (Russia) M Youzhny	7	7
13	(Czech Republic) F Čermák (Czech Republic) J Levinský	5	5
11	(Austria) J Knowle (Austria) J Melzer	6^{5}	2
(Finland) J Nieminen (United States) G Oliver	7^{7}	6
(Austria) A Peya (Germany) B Phau	3	6^{4}
6	(Czech Republic) M Damm (India) L Paes	6	7^{7}

Third round
1	(United States) B Bryan (United States) M Bryan	7^{7}	6^{2}	4
(Czech Republic) L Friedl (Russia) M Youzhny	6^{5}	7^{7}	6
(Finland) J Nieminen (United States) G Oliver	4	2
6	(Czech Republic) M Damm (India) L Paes	6	6

Quarterfinals
(Czech Republic) L Friedl (Russia) M Youzhny	4	6	1
6	(Czech Republic) M Damm (India) L Paes	6	4	6

==== Section 2 ====
First round
4	(Australia) P Hanley (Zimbabwe) K Ullyett	6	3	6
(Australia) J Kerr (Czech Republic) D Škoch	2	6	4
WC	(United States) A Delic (United States) J Morrison	6	3	6
ALT	(Czech Republic) J Hernych (Croatia) I Karlović	3	6	3
(South Africa) C Haggard (United States) B Reynolds	6	6
(Czech Republic) T Cibulec (Poland) Ł Kubot	1	4
(Switzerland) Y Allegro (Italy) D Bracciali	6	7
15	(Austria) O Marach (Czech Republic) C Suk	2	5
12	(Argentina) J Acasuso (Argentina) S Prieto	3	4
(Belgium) O Rochus (Belgium) K Vliegen	6	6
(Spain) D Ferrer (Spain) F Vicente	7	6
WC	(United States) K Damico (United States) N Schnugg	5	2
(Croatia) I Ljubičić (Italy) U Vico	2	1
(Argentina) JI Chela (Chile) N Massú	6	6
(Argentina) L Arnold Ker (Argentina) A Calleri	5	3
5	(France) F Santoro (Serbia) N Zimonjić	7	6

Second round
4	(Australia) P Hanley (Zimbabwe) K Ullyett	6	6
WC	(United States) A Delic (United States) J Morrison	2	2
(South Africa) C Haggard (United States) B Reynolds	7^{8}	6^{5}	6
(Switzerland) Y Allegro (Italy) D Bracciali	6^{6}	7^{7}	4
(Belgium) O Rochus (Belgium) K Vliegen	6	6
(Spain) D Ferrer (Spain) F Vicente	1	3
(Argentina) JI Chela (Chile) N Massú	3	2
5	(France) F Santoro (Serbia) N Zimonjić	6	6

Third round
4	(Australia) P Hanley (Zimbabwe) K Ullyett	6	6
(South Africa) C Haggard (United States) B Reynolds	4	4
(Belgium) O Rochus (Belgium) K Vliegen	6^{2}	6	6^{6}
5	(France) F Santoro (Serbia) N Zimonjić	7^{7}	4	7^{8}

Quarterfinals
4	(Australia) P Hanley (Zimbabwe) K Ullyett	3	6	6
5	(France) F Santoro (Serbia) N Zimonjić	6	3	4

=== Bottom half ===
==== Section 3 ====
First round
8	(Sweden) S Aspelin (Australia) T Perry	7	6
WC	(United States) A Clayton (United States) D Young	5	0
(Australia) A Fisher (United States) T Phillips	6	2	6
(United Kingdom) J Auckland (United Kingdom) A Murray	4	6	4
(France) J Benneteau (France) N Mahut	6^{3}	5
(Germany) C Kas (Germany) P Petzschner	7^{7}	7
(Spain) A Martín (Italy) P Starace	0	2	r
10	(Poland) M Fyrstenberg (Poland) M Matkowski	6	3
14	(Australia) W Arthurs (United States) J Gimelstob	6	6
(Spain) F López (Belgium) C Rochus	3	4
(United States) P Goldstein (United States) J Thomas	6	6
(Spain) N Almagro (Spain) F Verdasco	4	2
(France) S Grosjean (Russia) D Tursunov	3	6	2r.
(United States) M Fish (Chile) F González	6	2	1
(Czech Republic) T Berdych (Czech Republic) J Hájek	5	3
3	(The Bahamas) M Knowles (Canada) D Nestor	7	6

Second round
8	(Sweden) S Aspelin (Australia) T Perry	3	7	6^{2}
(Australia) A Fisher (United States) T Phillips	6	5	7^{7}
(Germany) C Kas (Germany) P Petzschner	2	6^{8}
10	(Poland) M Fyrstenberg (Poland) M Matkowski	6	7^{10}
14	(Australia) W Arthurs (United States) J Gimelstob	6	6^{2}	6^{4}
(United States) P Goldstein (United States) J Thomas	2	7^{7}	7^{7}
(United States) M Fish (Chile) F González	6^{5}	3
3	(The Bahamas) M Knowles (Canada) D Nestor	7^{7}	6

Third round
(Australia) A Fisher (United States) T Phillips	6	6
10	(Poland) M Fyrstenberg (Poland) M Matkowski	4	4
(United States) P Goldstein (United States) J Thomas	4	6	6
3	(The Bahamas) M Knowles (Canada) D Nestor	6	3	4

Quarterfinals
(Australia) A Fisher (United States) T Phillips	7	6
(United States) P Goldstein (United States) J Thomas	5	4

==== Section 4 ====
First round
7	(Israel) J Erlich (Israel) A Ram	4	6	6
WC	(United States) J Levine (United States) S Querrey	6	3	2
(Spain) R Ramírez Hidalgo (Spain) A Montañés	1	3
(South Africa) J Coetzee (Netherlands) R Wassen	6	6
(France) A Clément (France) M Llodra	6	7^{7}
(Italy) D Sanguinetti (Italy) F Volandri	3	6^{4}
(France) F Serra (France) G Simon	3	2
9	(Czech Republic) L Dlouhý (Czech Republic) P Vízner	6	6
16	(Germany) M Kohlmann (Germany) A Waske	6	6
(Spain) JC Ferrero (Spain) G García-López	3	3
(Germany) L Burgsmüller (United States) T Parrott	7	5	7^{7}
(Argentina) M García (Peru) L Horna	5	7	6^{5}
(Germany) F Mayer (Germany) R Schüttler	6	6
WC	(United States) S Jenkins (United States) R Ram	2	3
(Australia) S Huss (South Africa) W Moodie	7^{7}	4	4
2	(Sweden) J Björkman (Belarus) M Mirnyi	6^{4}	6	6

Second round
7	(Israel) J Erlich (Israel) A Ram	6	3	6
(South Africa) J Coetzee (Netherlands) R Wassen	3	6	2
(France) A Clément (France) M Llodra	7	6
9	(Czech Republic) L Dlouhý (Czech Republic) P Vízner	5	1
16	(Germany) M Kohlmann (Germany) A Waske	6	6
(Germany) L Burgsmüller (United States) T Parrott	3	2
(Germany) F Mayer (Germany) R Schüttler	3	2
2	(Sweden) J Björkman (Belarus) M Mirnyi	6	6

Third round
7	(Israel) J Erlich (Israel) A Ram	7^{7}	6^{5}	2
(France) A Clément (France) M Llodra	6^{2}	7^{7}	6
16	(Germany) M Kohlmann (Germany) A Waske	6	3	4
2	(Sweden) J Björkman (Belarus) M Mirnyi	4	6	6

Quarterfinals
(France) A Clément (France) M Llodra	6^{8}	7^{8}	2
2	(Sweden) J Björkman (Belarus) M Mirnyi	7^{10}	6^{6}	6
