= 2006 US Open – Wheelchair women's doubles =

Wheelchair women's doubles
- 2006 US Open

Final
- Champion: (Netherlands) Jiske Griffioen (Netherlands) Esther Vergeer
- Runner-up: (Netherlands) Korie Homan (Netherlands) Maaike Smit
- Score: 6–4, 6–4

Events
Singles	men	women		boys	girls
Doubles	men	women	mixed	boys	girls
WC Singles	men	women	quad
WC Doubles	men	women	quad
Legends	men	women	mixed
← 2005 ·	US Open	· 2007 →

Defending champion Esther Vergeer and her partner Jiske Griffioen defeated the other defending champion Korie Homan and her partner Maaike Smit in the final, 6–4, 6–4 to win the women's doubles wheelchair tennis title at the 2006 US Open.

== Draw ==
=== Key ===
- Q = Qualifier
- WC = Wild card
- LL = Lucky loser
- Alt = Alternate
- ITF = ITF entry
- PR = Protected ranking
- SR = Special ranking
- SE = Special exempt
- JE = Junior exempt
- JR = Junior Accelerator Programme entrant
- CO = College Accelerator Programme entrant
- NG = Next Gen Accelerator Program entrant
- w/o = Walkover
- r = Retired
- d = Defaulted

=== Finals ===
First round
(Netherlands) Jiske Griffioen (Netherlands) Esther Vergeer	6	6
(United States) Beth Arnoult (United States) Kaitlyn Verfuerth	2	2
(Netherlands) Korie Homan (Netherlands) Maaike Smit	5	6	6
(France) Florence Gravellier (Netherlands) Sharon Walraven	7	2	4

Finals
(Netherlands) Jiske Griffioen (Netherlands) Esther Vergeer	6	6
(Netherlands) Korie Homan (Netherlands) Maaike Smit	4	4
