= 2007 Australian Open – Men's singles qualifying =

Men's singles qualifying
- 2007 Australian Open

Events
Singles	men	women		boys	girls
Doubles	men	women	mixed	boys	girls
WC Singles	men	women	quad
WC Doubles	men	women	quad
Legends	men	women	mixed

Qualification
Singles	men	women
- Australian Open

The qualifying draw for the Men's singles at the 2007 Australian Open was played from 15 January to 28 January, 2007. It resulted in 16 players qualifying.

== Seeds ==
1. (Italy) Davide Sanguinetti (first round)
2. (Colombia) Alejandro Falla (second round)
3. (Germany) Alexander Waske (qualified)
4. (Romania) Andrei Pavel (first round)
5. (Russia) Teymuraz Gabashvili (qualified)
6. (United States) Michael Russell (qualified)
7. (Netherlands) Raemon Sluiter (qualifying competition)
8. (Greece) Konstantinos Economidis (qualifying competition)
9. (Austria) Oliver Marach (first round)
10. (United Kingdom) Alex Bogdanovic (first round)
11. (Serbia) Boris Pašanski (second round)
12. (Czech Republic) Robin Vik (qualifying competition)
13. (Poland) Łukasz Kubot (qualifying competition)
14. (Serbia) Ilija Bozoljac (qualified)
15. (Italy) Simone Bolelli (second round)
16. (South Africa) Wesley Moodie (second round)
17. (Czech Republic) Tomáš Zíb (second round)
18. (Italy) Federico Luzzi (qualifying competition)
19. (Spain) Gorka Fraile (first round)
20. (Austria) Alexander Peya (second round)
21. (Latvia) Ernests Gulbis (first round)
22. (Germany) Denis Gremelmayr (qualifying competition)
23. (Sweden) Andreas Vinciguerra (withdrew)
24. (Switzerland) Marco Chiudinelli (qualified)
25. (Chinese Taipei) Jimmy Wang (first round)
26. (Chile) Paul Capdeville (qualified)
27. (Denmark) Kenneth Carlsen (second round)
28. (Germany) Mischa Zverev (qualified)
29. (South Africa) Rik de Voest (second round)
30. (Germany) Michael Berrer (qualified)
31. (France) Jean-Christophe Faurel (first round)
32. (Australia) Nathan Healey (qualifying competition)
33. (Israel) Noam Okun (first round)

== Qualifiers ==
1. (United Kingdom) Alan Mackin
2. (United States) Zack Fleishman
3. (Germany) Alexander Waske
4. (Germany) Mischa Zverev
5. (Russia) Teymuraz Gabashvili
6. (United States) Michael Russell
7. (United States) Bobby Reynolds
8. (Switzerland) Marco Chiudinelli
9. (Croatia) Marin Čilić
10. (Germany) Michael Berrer
11. (Israel) Dudi Sela
12. (Chile) Paul Capdeville
13. (Slovakia) Lukáš Lacko
14. (Serbia) Ilija Bozoljac
15. (United States) Brian Wilson
16. (United States) Alex Kuznetsov

== Qualifying draw ==
Key

- Q = Qualifier
- WC = Wild card
- LL = Lucky loser
- Alt = Alternate
- ITF = ITF entry
- PR = Protected ranking
- SR = Special ranking
- SE = Special exempt
- JE = Junior exempt
- JR = Junior Accelerator Programme entrant
- CO = College Accelerator Programme entrant
- NG = Next Gen Accelerator Program entrant
- w/o = Walkover
- r = Retired
- d = Defaulted

=== First qualifier ===
First round
1	(Italy) Davide Sanguinetti	3	3
(United Kingdom) Alan Mackin	6	6
(Poland) Michał Przysiężny	3	5
(United States) Alex Bogomolov Jr.	6	7
(Germany) Dieter Kindlmann	4	5
(United States) Jesse Witten	6	7
(Italy) Andrea Stoppini	4	2
18	(Italy) Federico Luzzi	6	6

Second round
(United Kingdom) Alan Mackin	6	6
(United States) Alex Bogomolov Jr.	3	1
(United States) Jesse Witten	3	3
18	(Italy) Federico Luzzi	6	6

Qualifying competition
(United Kingdom) Alan Mackin	2	6	6
18	(Italy) Federico Luzzi	6	3	4

=== Second qualifier ===
First round
2	(Colombia) Alejandro Falla	6	6
(Germany) Alexander Satschko	3	2
(Czech Republic) Pavel Šnobel	6	5	3^{r}
(Germany) Tobias Summerer	2	7	3
(France) Édouard Roger-Vasselin	1	1
(United States) Zack Fleishman	6	6
(Romania) Adrian Ungur	7^{7}	3	2
27	(Denmark) Kenneth Carlsen	6^{5}	6	6

Second round
2	(Colombia) Alejandro Falla	5	6	6
(Germany) Tobias Summerer	7	2	8
(United States) Zack Fleishman	7	6
27	(Denmark) Kenneth Carlsen	5	3

Qualifying competition
(Germany) Tobias Summerer	2	5
(United States) Zack Fleishman	6	7

=== Third qualifier ===
First round
3	(Germany) Alexander Waske	6	1	6
(United States) Rajeev Ram	2	6	3
(United States) Wayne Odesnik	6	6
(France) Alexandre Sidorenko	1	3
(United States) Phillip Simmonds	3	4
(Germany) Dominik Meffert	6	6
(France) Mathieu Montcourt	3	2
32	(Australia) Nathan Healey	6	6

Second round
3	(Germany) Alexander Waske	6	6
(United States) Wayne Odesnik	2	4
(Germany) Dominik Meffert	3	4
32	(Australia) Nathan Healey	6	6

Qualifying competition
3	(Germany) Alexander Waske	5	6	6
32	(Australia) Nathan Healey	7	4	4

=== Fourth qualifier ===
First round
4	(Romania) Andrei Pavel	6	4	4
(Serbia) Viktor Troicki	3	6	6
(United States) Scott Oudsema	6	6
Alt	(Spain) Pablo Andújar	1	1
(Spain) Marc Fornell	7	6
(Russia) Mikhail Ledovskikh	5	1
WC	(Australia) Adam Feeney	3	5
28	(Germany) Mischa Zverev	6	7

Second round
(Serbia) Viktor Troicki	3	6	6
(United States) Scott Oudsema	6	3	2
(Spain) Marc Fornell	3	7	2
28	(Germany) Mischa Zverev	6	5	6

Qualifying competition
(Serbia) Viktor Troicki	5	6	1
28	(Germany) Mischa Zverev	7	3	6

=== Fifth qualifier ===
First round
5	(Russia) Teymuraz Gabashvili	6	6
WC	(Australia) Andrew Coelho	1	4
WC	(Australia) Joshua Crowe	2	4
(Germany) Simon Stadler	6	6
(France) Jérémy Chardy	6	0	1
(United States) Nicholas Monroe	3	6	6
(Italy) Simone Vagnozzi	4	4
22	(Germany) Denis Gremelmayr	6	6

Second round
5	(Russia) Teymuraz Gabashvili	6	6
(Germany) Simon Stadler	1	2
(United States) Nicholas Monroe	1	1
22	(Germany) Denis Gremelmayr	6	6

Qualifying competition
5	(Russia) Teymuraz Gabashvili	4	6	8
22	(Germany) Denis Gremelmayr	6	0	6

=== Sixth qualifier ===
First round
6	(United States) Michael Russell	6	7
(Germany) Lars Burgsmüller	4	5
(Israel) Harel Levy	7	6^{9}	0
(Argentina) Leonardo Mayer	5	7^{11}	6
(Brazil) Rogério Dutra Silva	6	3	2
(Australia) Paul Baccanello	4	6	6
(Switzerland) Stéphane Bohli	6
31	(France) Jean-Christophe Faurel	1^{r}

Second round
6	(United States) Michael Russell	6	6
(Argentina) Leonardo Mayer	1	3
(Australia) Paul Baccanello	4	6	6
(Switzerland) Stéphane Bohli	6	3	3

Qualifying competition
6	(United States) Michael Russell	6	6
(Australia) Paul Baccanello	2	1

=== Seventh qualifier ===
First round
7	(Netherlands) Raemon Sluiter	2
(Spain) Pablo Santos	0^{r}
(Slovakia) Pavol Červenák	2	3
(Italy) Flavio Cipolla	6	6
(United States) Bobby Reynolds	3	6	6
(France) Thierry Ascione	6	1	2
(Japan) Gouichi Motomura	6	4	6
19	(Spain) Gorka Fraile	4	6	2

Second round
7	(Netherlands) Raemon Sluiter	6	6
(Italy) Flavio Cipolla	3	3
(United States) Bobby Reynolds	6	6^{4}	6
(Japan) Gouichi Motomura	3	7^{7}	4

Qualifying competition
7	(Netherlands) Raemon Sluiter	6	2	1^{r}
(United States) Bobby Reynolds	3	6	2

=== Eighth qualifier ===
First round
8	(Greece) Konstantinos Economidis	6	6
(Monaco) Benjamin Balleret	0	2
(Sweden) Jacob Adaktusson	6^{4}	1
(France) Antony Dupuis	7^{7}	6
(Venezuela) Yohny Romero	3	2
(Ukraine) Sergiy Stakhovsky	6	6
PR	(France) Sébastien de Chaunac	3	4
24	(Switzerland) Marco Chiudinelli	6	6

Second round
8	(Greece) Konstantinos Economidis	4	7^{7}	6
(France) Antony Dupuis	6	6^{5}	1
(Ukraine) Sergiy Stakhovsky	6^{6}	4
24	(Switzerland) Marco Chiudinelli	7^{8}	6

Qualifying competition
8	(Greece) Konstantinos Economidis	0	4
24	(Switzerland) Marco Chiudinelli	6	6

=== Ninth qualifier ===
First round
9	(Austria) Oliver Marach	4	5
(Croatia) Marin Čilić	6	7
(Croatia) Saša Tuksar	5	2
(Russia) Yuri Schukin	7	6
(Brazil) André Ghem	3	6^{2}
(United Kingdom) Jonathan Marray	6	7^{7}
(Sweden) Filip Prpic	6	6^{3}	6
33	(Israel) Noam Okun	4	7^{7}	2

Second round
(Croatia) Marin Čilić	6	6
(Russia) Yuri Schukin	3	2
(United Kingdom) Jonathan Marray	7^{7}	6
(Sweden) Filip Prpic	6^{2}	3

Qualifying competition
(Croatia) Marin Čilić	7	7^{13}
(United Kingdom) Jonathan Marray	5	6^{11}

=== Tenth qualifier ===
First round
10	(United Kingdom) Alex Bogdanovic	3	4
(Switzerland) George Bastl	6	6
(France) David Guez	7^{8}	6
(Uzbekistan) Denis Istomin	6^{6}	4
(India) Rohan Bopanna	4	6	6
(Germany) Tobias Clemens	6	4	4
(Italy) Fabio Fognini	3	3
30	(Germany) Michael Berrer	6	6

Second round
(Switzerland) George Bastl	7^{10}	2	4
(France) David Guez	6^{8}	6	6
(India) Rohan Bopanna	6^{3}	3
30	(Germany) Michael Berrer	7^{7}	6

Qualifying competition
(France) David Guez	4	4
30	(Germany) Michael Berrer	6	6

=== Eleventh qualifier ===
First round
11	(Serbia) Boris Pašanski	1	2
PR	(Romania) Adrian Voinea	6	2^{r}
(Czech Republic) Jan Mertl	1	0
(Israel) Dudi Sela	6	6
(France) Nicolas Tourte	7^{8}	6^{4}	7
(Colombia) Santiago Giraldo	6^{6}	7^{7}	5
(Germany) Tomas Behrend	1	2
20	(Austria) Alexander Peya	6	6

Second round
11	(Serbia) Boris Pašanski	6	2	2
(Israel) Dudi Sela	2	6	6
(France) Nicolas Tourte	6	5	9
20	(Austria) Alexander Peya	4	7	7

Qualifying competition
(Israel) Dudi Sela	6	6
(France) Nicolas Tourte	3	1

=== Twelfth qualifier ===
First round
12	(Czech Republic) Robin Vik	6	1	6
WC	(Australia) Brydan Klein	0	6	4
WC	(Australia) Colin Ebelthite	3	7^{7}	4
(Germany) Philipp Petzschner	6	6^{3}	6
(Italy) Leonardo Azzaro	3	6
(France) Julien Jeanpierre	6	3^{r}
(Czech Republic) Lukáš Rosol	3	3
26	(Chile) Paul Capdeville	6	6

Second round
12	(Czech Republic) Robin Vik	7^{9}	6
(Germany) Philipp Petzschner	6^{7}	3
(Italy) Leonardo Azzaro	4	5
26	(Chile) Paul Capdeville	6	7

Qualifying competition
12	(Czech Republic) Robin Vik	4	4
26	(Chile) Paul Capdeville	6	6

=== Thirteenth qualifier ===
First round
13	(Poland) Łukasz Kubot	6	4	6
(Romania) Victor Crivoi	3	6	3
WC	(Australia) Nick Lindahl	3	3
(Japan) Satoshi Iwabuchi	6	6
(Slovakia) Lukáš Lacko	6	4	6
(Slovakia) Ivo Klec	4	6	1
(Russia) Andrey Golubev	6	7^{9}
21	(Latvia) Ernests Gulbis	3	6^{7}

Second round
13	(Poland) Łukasz Kubot	3	6	6
(Japan) Satoshi Iwabuchi	6	1	2
(Slovakia) Lukáš Lacko	6	6
(Russia) Andrey Golubev	4	1

Qualifying competition
13	(Poland) Łukasz Kubot	6^{4}	6	4
(Slovakia) Lukáš Lacko	7^{7}	4	6

=== Fourteenth qualifier ===
First round
14	(Serbia) Ilija Bozoljac	6	3	6
(Czech Republic) Tomáš Cakl	2	6	1
WC	(Australia) Matthew Ebden	6	5	8
(United Kingdom) Richard Bloomfield	3	7	6
(Slovakia) Michal Mertiňák	6	2	6
WC	(Australia) Joseph Sirianni	2	6	2
Alt	(Brazil) Thiago Alves	5	0
29	(South Africa) Rik de Voest	7	6

Second round
14	(Serbia) Ilija Bozoljac	6	6
WC	(Australia) Matthew Ebden	2	4
(Slovakia) Michal Mertiňák	6	6
29	(South Africa) Rik de Voest	2	4

Qualifying competition
14	(Serbia) Ilija Bozoljac	6	1	11
(Slovakia) Michal Mertiňák	3	6	9

=== Fifteenth qualifier ===
First round
15	(Italy) Simone Bolelli	6	3	13
WC	(Australia) Greg Jones	4	6	11
(United States) Sam Warburg	2	2^{r}
(Austria) Daniel Köllerer	6	2
(United States) Brian Wilson	6	6
(Romania) Teodor-Dacian Crăciun	4	2
(Spain) Marc López	7	7^{9}
25	(Chinese Taipei) Jimmy Wang	5	6^{7}

Second round
15	(Italy) Simone Bolelli	4	2
(Austria) Daniel Köllerer	6	6
(United States) Brian Wilson	2	6	6
(Spain) Marc López	6	2	2

Qualifying competition
(Austria) Daniel Köllerer	6^{8}	4
(United States) Brian Wilson	7^{10}	6

=== Sixteenth qualifier ===
First round
16	(South Africa) Wesley Moodie	6	6
(United Kingdom) Jamie Baker	2	4
(Brazil) Júlio Silva	2	6	9
(Netherlands) Robin Haase	6	4	7
(Ukraine) Alexandr Dolgopolov	6^{4}	5
(United States) Alex Kuznetsov	7^{7}	7
(France) Jean-René Lisnard	4	3
17	(Czech Republic) Tomáš Zíb	6	6

Second round
16	(South Africa) Wesley Moodie	6^{4}	3
(Brazil) Júlio Silva	7^{7}	6
(United States) Alex Kuznetsov	6	7^{7}
17	(Czech Republic) Tomáš Zíb	4	6^{4}

Qualifying competition
(Brazil) Júlio Silva	3	4
(United States) Alex Kuznetsov	6	6
