= 2007 Australian Open – Women's singles qualifying =

Women's singles qualifying
- 2007 Australian Open

Events
Singles	men	women		boys	girls
Doubles	men	women	mixed	boys	girls
WC Singles	men	women	quad
WC Doubles	men	women	quad
Legends	men	women	mixed

Qualification
Singles	men	women
- Australian Open

This article displays the qualifying draw for the Women's singles at the 2007 Australian Open.

== Seeds ==
1. (Ukraine) Kateryna Bondarenko (first round)
2. (United States) Lilia Osterloh (first round)
3. (Czech Republic) Hana Šromová (first round)
4. (Germany) Kristina Barrois (qualifying competition)
5. (Ukraine) Julia Vakulenko (qualified)
6. (Czech Republic) Klára Zakopalová (qualified)
7. (Canada) Stéphanie Dubois (first round)
8. (Italy) Karin Knapp (first round)
9. (Belarus) Tatiana Poutchek (qualifying competition)
10. (Switzerland) Timea Bacsinszky (qualifying competition)
11. (Austria) Yvonne Meusburger (second round)
12. (Croatia) Ivana Lisjak (qualifying competition)
13. (United States) Bethanie Mattek (qualifying competition)
14. (Ukraine) Viktoriya Kutuzova (first round)
15. (United States) Lisa Raymond (withdrew, retired from singles)
16. (Chinese Taipei) Hsieh Su-wei (second round)
17. (Japan) Erika Takao (first round)
18. (Russia) Alla Kudryavtseva (qualified)
19. (Germany) Tatjana Malek (first round)
20. (Hungary) Kira Nagy (second round)
21. (United States) Ahsha Rolle (qualified)
22. (Russia) Yaroslava Shvedova (qualifying competition)
23. (France) Mathilde Johansson (first round)
24. (Georgia (country)) Margalita Chakhnashvili (first round)

== Qualifiers ==
1. (France) Alizé Cornet
2. (Russia) Alla Kudryavtseva
3. (France) Stéphanie Cohen-Aloro
4. (Czech Republic) Sandra Záhlavová
5. (Ukraine) Julia Vakulenko
6. (Czech Republic) Klára Zakopalová
7. (Slovenia) Andreja Klepač
8. (Argentina) Jorgelina Cravero
9. (United States) Ahsha Rolle
10. (Czech Republic) Renata Voráčová
11. (Luxembourg) Anne Kremer
12. (Austria) Tamira Paszek

== Qualifying draw ==
Key

- Q = Qualifier
- WC = Wild card
- LL = Lucky loser
- Alt = Alternate
- ITF = ITF entry
- PR = Protected ranking
- SR = Special ranking
- SE = Special exempt
- JE = Junior exempt
- JR = Junior Accelerator Programme entrant
- CO = College Accelerator Programme entrant
- NG = Next Gen Accelerator Program entrant
- w/o = Walkover
- r = Retired
- d = Defaulted

=== First qualifier ===
First round
1	(Ukraine) Kateryna Bondarenko	4	6	4
(France) Alizé Cornet	6	1	6
(United Kingdom) Anne Keothavong	6	6
(Japan) Junri Namigata	4	4
(Argentina) María José Argeri	7^{7}	6
(China) Zhang Shuai	6^{5}	0
(Israel) Yevgenia Savransky	1	7^{7}	6
23	(France) Mathilde Johansson	6	6^{4}	4

Second round
(France) Alizé Cornet	6	6
(United Kingdom) Anne Keothavong	3	2
(Argentina) María José Argeri	6	6
(Israel) Yevgenia Savransky	2	1

Qualifying competition
(France) Alizé Cornet	5	7	6
(Argentina) María José Argeri	7	5	4

=== Second qualifier ===
First round
2	(United States) Lilia Osterloh	1	2
(France) Olivia Sanchez	6	6
(Japan) Seiko Okamoto	5	4
(Netherlands) Elise Tamaëla	7	6
(Croatia) Ivana Abramović	6	5	2
(Tunisia) Selima Sfar	2	7	6
(Slovakia) Dominika Cibulková	4	7	7
18	(Russia) Alla Kudryavtseva	6	5	9

Second round
(France) Olivia Sanchez	3	6	4
(Netherlands) Elise Tamaëla	6	1	6
(Tunisia) Selima Sfar	1	3
18	(Russia) Alla Kudryavtseva	6	6

Qualifying competition
(Netherlands) Elise Tamaëla	5	6	1
18	(Russia) Alla Kudryavtseva	7	1	6

=== Third qualifier ===
First round
3	(Czech Republic) Hana Šromová	6	2	1
(France) Stéphanie Cohen-Aloro	1	6	6
(Ukraine) Tatiana Perebiynis	6	7^{11}
(Uzbekistan) Akgul Amanmuradova	3	6^{9}
(Russia) Evgeniya Rodina	6	6
(United States) Angela Haynes	3	0
(Germany) Kathrin Wörle	1	4
13	(United States) Bethanie Mattek	6	6

Second round
(France) Stéphanie Cohen-Aloro	6	2	6
(Ukraine) Tatiana Perebiynis	4	6	1
(Russia) Evgeniya Rodina	4	1
13	(United States) Bethanie Mattek	6	6

Qualifying competition
(France) Stéphanie Cohen-Aloro	2	7^{7}	6
13	(United States) Bethanie Mattek	6	6^{4}	1

=== Fourth qualifier ===
First round
4	(Germany) Kristina Barrois	6	6
(Argentina) Paola Suárez	4	1
(Russia) Lioudmila Skavronskaia	6	6
(Republic of Ireland) Kelly Liggan	4	3
(Italy) Nathalie Viérin	6	3	2
(Czech Republic) Sandra Záhlavová	4	6	6
(United States) Neha Uberoi	7	6
14	(Ukraine) Viktoriya Kutuzova	5	3

Second round
4	(Germany) Kristina Barrois	5	7	6
(Russia) Lioudmila Skavronskaia	7	5	1
(Czech Republic) Sandra Záhlavová	7	6
(United States) Neha Uberoi	5	0

Qualifying competition
4	(Germany) Kristina Barrois	3	6	5
(Czech Republic) Sandra Záhlavová	6	4	7

=== Fifth qualifier ===
First round
5	(Ukraine) Julia Vakulenko	6	3	6
(Germany) Angelique Kerber	1	6	0
(United States) Carly Gullickson	6	2	5
(Romania) Monica Niculescu	3	6	7
(China) Chen Yanchong	6	2	7^{r}
(United Kingdom) Katie O'Brien	3	6	8
WC	(Russia) Anastasia Pavlyuchenkova	7	6
24	(Georgia (country)) Margalita Chakhnashvili	5	4

Second round
5	(Ukraine) Julia Vakulenko	6	5	7
(Romania) Monica Niculescu	0	7	5
(United Kingdom) Katie O'Brien	6^{5}	2
WC	(Russia) Anastasia Pavlyuchenkova	7^{7}	6

Qualifying competition
5	(Ukraine) Julia Vakulenko	3	6	6
WC	(Russia) Anastasia Pavlyuchenkova	6	1	1

=== Sixth qualifier ===
First round
6	(Czech Republic) Klára Zakopalová	6	6
(Argentina) María Emilia Salerni	3	2
(France) Virginie Pichet	2	2
(Czech Republic) Barbora Záhlavová-Strýcová	6	6
PR	(Australia) Evie Dominikovic	6	7
(Czech Republic) Kateřina Klapková	1	5
(United States) Abigail Spears	7	6
19	(Germany) Tatjana Malek	5	4

Second round
6	(Czech Republic) Klára Zakopalová	6	6
(Czech Republic) Barbora Záhlavová-Strýcová	3	1
PR	(Australia) Evie Dominikovic	3	2
(United States) Abigail Spears	6	6

Qualifying competition
6	(Czech Republic) Klára Zakopalová	6	6
(United States) Abigail Spears	4	2

=== Seventh qualifier ===
First round
7	(Canada) Stéphanie Dubois	5	2
(Romania) Anda Perianu	7	6
(China) Yan Zi	3	4
(Germany) Vanessa Henke	6	6
(Slovenia) Andreja Klepač	6	6
WC	(Australia) Alenka Hubacek	1	4
(Germany) Gréta Arn	3	6	6
17	(Japan) Erika Takao	6	1	1

Second round
(Romania) Anda Perianu	5	6	4
(Germany) Vanessa Henke	7	3	6
(Slovenia) Andreja Klepač	7	6
(Germany) Gréta Arn	5	1

Qualifying competition
(Germany) Vanessa Henke	1	1
(Slovenia) Andreja Klepač	6	6

=== Eighth qualifier ===
First round
8	(Italy) Karin Knapp	4	5
(Puerto Rico) Kristina Brandi	6	7
(Chinese Taipei) Chan Chin-wei	6	6
(Japan) Ryōko Fuda	2	3
(Japan) Shiho Hisamatsu	2	1
(Argentina) Jorgelina Cravero	6	6
(Chinese Taipei) Chuang Chia-jung	2	4
20	(Hungary) Kira Nagy	6	6

Second round
(Puerto Rico) Kristina Brandi	4	5
(Chinese Taipei) Chan Chin-wei	6	7
(Argentina) Jorgelina Cravero	6	6
20	(Hungary) Kira Nagy	1	2

Qualifying competition
(Chinese Taipei) Chan Chin-wei	6^{7}	5
(Argentina) Jorgelina Cravero	7^{9}	7

=== Ninth qualifier ===
First round
9	(Belarus) Tatiana Poutchek	6	6
WC	(Australia) Shayna McDowell	3	0
(Italy) Sara Errani	2	4
(Japan) Ayumi Morita	6	6
(Hungary) Ágnes Szávay	4	6	8
(Poland) Joanna Sakowicz	6	4	6
(Czech Republic) Lucie Hradecká	4	4
21	(United States) Ahsha Rolle	6	6

Second round
9	(Belarus) Tatiana Poutchek	0	7	6
(Japan) Ayumi Morita	6	5	1
(Hungary) Ágnes Szávay	4	4
21	(United States) Ahsha Rolle	6	6

Qualifying competition
9	(Belarus) Tatiana Poutchek	6	5	0
21	(United States) Ahsha Rolle	4	7	6

=== Tenth qualifier ===
First round
10	(Switzerland) Timea Bacsinszky	6	7^{7}
(United Kingdom) Melanie South	3	6^{4}
(New Zealand) Marina Erakovic	7	6
(Romania) Simona Matei	5	1
(Croatia) Sanja Ančić	5	3
(Czech Republic) Renata Voráčová	7	6
(Spain) Arantxa Parra Santonja	4	5
Alt	(United States) Raquel Kops-Jones	6	7

Second round
10	(Switzerland) Timea Bacsinszky	3	7	6
(New Zealand) Marina Erakovic	6	5	4
(Czech Republic) Renata Voráčová	6	6
Alt	(United States) Raquel Kops-Jones	4	4

Qualifying competition
10	(Switzerland) Timea Bacsinszky	2	6	3
(Czech Republic) Renata Voráčová	6	2	6

=== Eleventh qualifier ===
First round
11	(Austria) Yvonne Meusburger	6	6
WC	(Australia) Isabella Holland	3	1
(Hungary) Zsófia Gubacsi	1	5
(Luxembourg) Anne Kremer	6	7
(South Africa) Natalie Grandin	1	5
WC	(Australia) Marija Mirkovic	6	7
WC	(Australia) Lauren Breadmore	4	7^{7}	5
22	(Russia) Yaroslava Shvedova	6	6^{4}	7

Second round
11	(Austria) Yvonne Meusburger	0	3
(Luxembourg) Anne Kremer	6	6
WC	(Australia) Marija Mirkovic	2	2
22	(Russia) Yaroslava Shvedova	6	6

Qualifying competition
(Luxembourg) Anne Kremer	6	6
22	(Russia) Yaroslava Shvedova	2	4

=== Twelfth qualifier ===
First round
12	(Croatia) Ivana Lisjak	6	6
WC	(Australia) Alison Bai	1	3
(United States) Jessica Kirkland	4	2
(Russia) Ekaterina Ivanova	6	6
WC	(Australia) Trudi Musgrave	5	1
(Austria) Tamira Paszek	7	6
(India) Shikha Uberoi	6	3	3
16	(Chinese Taipei) Hsieh Su-wei	4	6	6

Second round
12	(Croatia) Ivana Lisjak	6	6
(Russia) Ekaterina Ivanova	2	3
(Austria) Tamira Paszek	6	6
16	(Chinese Taipei) Hsieh Su-wei	0	2

Qualifying competition
12	(Croatia) Ivana Lisjak	6	4	4
(Austria) Tamira Paszek	4	6	6
