= Tobias Summerer =

German tennis player

- Born: 1 February 1983 (age 43) Freising, Bavaria, West Germany
- Turned pro: 2002
- Plays: Right-handed
- Prize money: $160,426

Singles
- Highest ranking: 159

Grand Slam singles results
- Australian Open: Q3 (2007)
- French Open: Q1 (2005)
- Wimbledon: 1R (2005)
- US Open: 1R (2005)

Tobias Summerer (born 1 February 1983 in Freising, Bavaria) is a German tennis player, who reached a career high on 4 July 2005, when he became the number 159 of the world.

He is currently the coach of fellow German Philipp Kohlschreiber.
