= 2007 Australian Open – Girls' singles =

Girls' singles
- 2007 Australian Open

Final
- Champion: (Russia) Anastasia Pavlyuchenkova
- Runner-up: (United States) Madison Brengle
- Score: 7–6^{(8–6)}, 7–6^{(7–3)}

Events
Singles	men	women		boys	girls
Doubles	men	women	mixed	boys	girls
WC Singles	men	women	quad
WC Doubles	men	women	quad
Legends	men	women	mixed
- Australian Open

Defending champion Anastasia Pavlyuchenkova successfully defended her title, defeating Madison Brengle in the final, 7–6^{(8–6)}, 7–6^{(7–3)}.

== Seeds ==
1. (Russia) Anastasia Pavlyuchenkova (champion)
2. (Chinese Taipei) Chan Yung-jan (second round)
3. (Belarus) Ksenia Milevskaya (semifinals)
4. (Japan) Ayumi Morita (second round)
5. (Austria) Tamira Paszek (third round)
6. (France) Alizé Cornet (semifinals)
7. (Canada) Sharon Fichman (first round)
8. (Russia) Evgeniya Rodina (quarterfinals)
9. (United States) Julia Cohen (second round)
10. (Ukraine) Kristina Antoniychuk (third round)
11. (Poland) Urszula Radwańska (quarterfinals)
12. (Austria) Nikola Hofmanova (quarterfinals)
13. (Czech Republic) Kateřina Vaňková (first round)
14. (United States) Reka Zsilinszka (third round)
15. (Slovakia) Kristína Kučová (third round)
16. (United States) Madison Brengle (final)

== Draw ==
Key

- Q = Qualifier
- WC = Wild card
- LL = Lucky loser
- Alt = Alternate
- ITF = ITF entry
- PR = Protected ranking
- SR = Special ranking
- SE = Special exempt
- JE = Junior exempt
- JR = Junior Accelerator Programme entrant
- CO = College Accelerator Programme entrant
- NG = Next Gen Accelerator Program entrant
- w/o = Walkover
- r = Retired
- d = Defaulted

=== Finals ===
Quarterfinals
1	(Russia) Anastasia Pavlyuchenkova	6	6
12	(Austria) Nikola Hofmanova	4	3
(United States) Chelsey Gullickson	0	3
6	(France) Alizé Cornet	6	6
11	(Poland) Urszula Radwańska	3	3
3	(Belarus) Ksenia Milevskaya	6	6
8	(Russia) Evgeniya Rodina	3	6^{2}
16	(United States) Madison Brengle	6	7

Semifinals
1	(Russia) Anastasia Pavlyuchenkova	7	6
6	(France) Alizé Cornet	6^{6}	1
3	(Belarus) Ksenia Milevskaya	4	5
16	(United States) Madison Brengle	6	7

Final
1	(Russia) Anastasia Pavlyuchenkova	7^{8}	7^{7}
16	(United States) Madison Brengle	6^{6}	6^{3}

=== Top half ===
==== Section 1 ====
First round
1	(Russia) Anastasia Pavlyuchenkova	7	6
(Australia) Shayna McDowell	5	1
(Italy) Gioia Barbieri	0	1
(Japan) Shiho Akita	6	6
(Poland) Katarzyna Piter	6	6
(Australia) Sally Peers	3	0
(Thailand) Noppawan Lertcheewakarn	3	1
15	(Slovakia) Kristína Kučová	6	6
12	(Austria) Nikola Hofmanova	7	5	6
(South Korea) Han Sung-hee	5	7	0
(United States) Kimberly Couts	6	6
(Australia) Emelyn Starr	2	1
(Ukraine) Nadiia Kichenok	4	6^{5}
(Australia) Isabella Holland	6	7
(United States) Julia Boserup	6	6
5	(Canada) Sharon Fichman	2	2

Second round
1	(Russia) A Pavlyuchenkova	6	6
(Japan) S Akita	1	3
(Poland) K Piter	2	2
15	(Slovakia) K Kučová	6	6
12	(Austria) N Hofmanova	6	6
(United States) K Couts	1	4
(Australia) I Holland	2	6	0
(United States) J Boserup	6	1	6

Third round
1	(Russia) A Pavlyuchenkova	6	6
15	(Slovakia) K Kučová	0	3
12	(Austria) N Hofmanova	6	6
(United States) J Boserup	1	2

Quarterfinals
1	(Russia) A Pavlyuchenkova	6	6
12	(Austria) N Hofmanova	4	3

==== Section 2 ====
First round
4	(Japan) Ayumi Morita	6	6
(Hong Kong) Venise Chan	3	2
(Australia) Alison Bai	6	6
(Serbia) Nataša Zorić	1	3
(Australia) Brittany Sheed	2	5
(Russia) Alexandra Panova	6	7
(United States) Chelsey Gullickson	7	7^{7}
13	(Czech Republic) Kateřina Vaňková	5	6^{5}
9	(United States) Julia Cohen	6	6
(Australia) Stephanie Wiltshire	0	1
(China) Zhou Yimiao	6	6
(New Zealand) Ellen Barry	1	2
(Italy) Roxana Vaideanu	6^{3}	3
(Russia) Ksenia Lykina	7^{7}	6
(United Kingdom) Naomi Cavaday	1	6^{5}
6	(France) Alizé Cornet	6	7^{7}

Second round
4	(Japan) A Morita	4	6	4
(Australia) A Bai	6	1	6
(Russia) A Panova	6	6^{0}	0
(United States) Ch Gullickson	4	7^{7}	6
9	(United States) J Cohen	4	1
(China) Y Zhou	6	6
(Russia) K Lykina	2	1
6	(France) A Cornet	6	6

Third round
(Australia) A Bai	1	4
(United States) Ch Gullickson	6	6
(China) Y Zhou	0	5
6	(France) A Cornet	6	7

Quarterfinals
(United States) Ch Gullickson	0	3
6	(France) A Cornet	6	6

=== Bottom half ===
==== Section 3 ====
First round
5	(Austria) Tamira Paszek	6	6
(Belgium) Tamaryn Hendler	0	1
(Croatia) Petra Martić	6	6
(Slovakia) Klaudia Boczová	2	3
(United States) Courtney Clayton	6	6
(Japan) Emiko Ito	3	4
(Australia) Tyra Calderwood	4	4
11	(Poland) Urszula Radwańska	6	6
14	(United States) Reka Zsilinszka	5	6	6
(Australia) Michelle Brycki	7	4	1
(United Kingdom) Jade Curtis	6	4	7
(Ukraine) Lyudmyla Kichenok	4	6	9
(Italy) Erika Zanchetta	5	3
(Russia) Arina Rodionova	7	6
(Australia) Anna Wishink	6	1	4
3	(Belarus) Ksenia Milevskaya	3	6	6

Second round
5	(Austria) T Paszek	6	6
(Croatia) P Martić	2	2
(United States) C Clayton	6^{3}	0
11	(Poland) U Radwańska	7^{7}	6
14	(United States) R Zsilinszka	6	3	6
(Ukraine) L Kichenok	3	6	4
(Russia) Ar Rodionova	2	3
3	(Belarus) K Milevskaya	6	6

Third round
5	(Austria) T Paszek	3	3
11	(Poland) U Radwańska	6	6
14	(United States) R Zsilinszka	0	2
3	(Belarus) K Milevskaya	6	6

Quarterfinals
11	(Poland) U Radwańska	3	3
3	(Belarus) K Milevskaya	6	6

==== Section 4 ====
First round
8	(Russia) Evgeniya Rodina	6	6
(Sweden) Sandra Roma	1	1
(China) Liu Chang	4	1
(Australia) Alenka Hubacek	6	6
(Japan) Ai Yamamoto	2	3
(Serbia) Bojana Jovanovski	6	6
(Slovakia) Monika Širilová	3	2
10	(Ukraine) Kristina Antoniychuk	6	6
16	(United States) Madison Brengle	6	6
(Mexico) Valeria Pulido	1	2
(Russia) Marta Sirotkina	2	6	6
(Australia) Ashlee Brown	6	3	3
(Australia) Marija Mirkovic	0	4
(Hong Kong) Zhang Ling	6	6
(Thailand) Varatchaya Wongteanchai	0	1
2	(Chinese Taipei) Chan Yung-jan	6	6

Second round
8	(Russia) E Rodina	6	6
(Australia) A Hubacek	3	0
(Serbia) B Jovanovski	4	2
10	(Ukraine) K Antoniychuk	6	6
16	(United States) M Brengle	6	6
(Russia) M Sirotkina	3	3
(Hong Kong) L Zhang	6	6
2	(Chinese Taipei) Y-j Chan	3	2

Third round
8	(Russia) E Rodina	6	5	6
10	(Ukraine) K Antoniychuk	2	7	2
16	(United States) M Brengle	6	6
(Hong Kong) L Zhang	2	2

Quarterfinals
8	(Russia) E Rodina	3	6^{2}
16	(United States) M Brengle	6	7^{7}
