= 2007 Australian Open – Girls' doubles =

Girls' doubles
- 2007 Australian Open

Final
- Champion: (Russia) Evgeniya Rodina (Russia) Arina Rodionova
- Runner-up: (United States) Julia Cohen (Poland) Urszula Radwańska
- Score: 2-6, 6-3, 6-1

Events
Singles	men	women		boys	girls
Doubles	men	women	mixed	boys	girls
WC Singles	men	women	quad
WC Doubles	men	women	quad
Legends	men	women	mixed
- Australian Open

Evgeniya Rodina and Arina Rodionova won the title by defeating Julia Cohen and Urszula Radwańska 2–6, 6–3, 6–1 in the final.

== Seeds ==
1. (United States) Julia Cohen / (Poland) Urszula Radwańska (final)
2. (Canada) Sharon Fichman / (Czech Republic) Kateřina Vaňková (quarterfinals)
3. (Austria) Nikola Hofmanova / (United States) Reka Zsilinszka (first round)
4. (France) Alizé Cornet / (Austria) Tamira Paszek (second round)
5. (Ukraine) Kristina Antoniychuk / (Russia) Alexandra Panova (second round)
6. (Slovakia) Klaudia Boczová / (Slovakia) Kristína Kučová (semifinals)
7. (Russia) Ksenia Lykina / (Belarus) Ksenia Milevskaya (quarterfinals)
8. (United States) Madison Brengle / (United States) Kimberly Couts (quarterfinals)

== Draw ==
Key

- Q = Qualifier
- WC = Wild card
- LL = Lucky loser
- Alt = Alternate
- ITF = ITF entry
- PR = Protected ranking
- SR = Special ranking
- SE = Special exempt
- JE = Junior exempt
- JR = Junior Accelerator Programme entrant
- CO = College Accelerator Programme entrant
- NG = Next Gen Accelerator Program entrant
- w/o = Walkover
- r = Retired
- d = Defaulted

=== Finals ===
Semifinals
1	(United States) Julia Cohen (Poland) Urszula Radwańska	6	6
(Italy) Andreea-Roxana Vaideanu (Italy) Erika Zanchetta	3	2
(Russia) Evgeniya Rodina (Russia) Arina Rodionova	4	6	7^{7}
6	(Slovakia) Klaudia Boczová (Slovakia) Kristína Kučová	6	1	6^{3}

Final
1	(United States) Julia Cohen (Poland) Urszula Radwańska	6	3	1
(Russia) Evgeniya Rodina (Russia) Arina Rodionova	2	6	6

=== Top half ===
First round
1	(United States) Julia Cohen (Poland) Urszula Radwańska	6	6
(Australia) Ashlee Brown (Australia) Brittany Sheed	3	2
(China) Chang Liu (South Africa) Bianca Swanepoel	4	1
(Slovakia) Monika Sirilova (Serbia) Nataša Zorić	6	6
WC	(Australia) Alison Bai (Australia) Stephanie Wiltshire	4	6^{3}
(United States) Julia Boserup (United States) Courtney Clayton	6	7^{7}
(Japan) Emiko Ito (Japan) Ai Yamamoto	7	1	4
7	(Russia) Ksenia Lykina (Belarus) Ksenia Milevskaya	5	6	6
3	(Austria) Nikola Hofmanova (United States) Reka Zsilinszka	0	4
(Italy) Andreea-Roxana Vaideanu (Italy) Erika Zanchetta	6	6
(Thailand) Noppawan Lertcheewakarn (Thailand) Varatchaya Wongteanchai	2	4
(Ukraine) Lyudmyla Kichenok (Ukraine) Nadiia Kichenok	6	6
(United States) Chelsey Gullickson (Mexico) Valeria Pulido	7	6
WC	(Australia) Alenka Hubacek (Australia) Anna Wishink	5	2
(Italy) Gioia Barbieri (Russia) Marta Sirotkina	1	0
5	(Ukraine) Kristina Antoniychuk (Russia) Alexandra Panova	6	6

Second round
1	(United States) J Cohen (Poland) U Radwańska	6	6
(Slovakia) M Sirilova (Serbia) N Zorić	4	2
(United States) J Boserup (United States) C Clayton	3	4
7	(Russia) K Lykina (Belarus) K Milevskaya	6	6
(Italy) A-R Vaideanu (Italy) E Zanchetta	6	4	7^{9}
(Ukraine) L Kichenok (Ukraine) N Kichenok	2	6	6^{7}
(United States) C Gullickson (Mexico) V Pulido	6	6
5	(Ukraine) K Antoniychuk (Russia) A Panova	0	0

Quarterfinals
1	(United States) J Cohen (Poland) U Radwańska	6	6
7	(Russia) K Lykina (Belarus) K Milevskaya	2	4
(Italy) A-R Vaideanu (Italy) E Zanchetta	6	6
(United States) C Gullickson (Mexico) V Pulido	3	2

Semifinals
1	(United States) J Cohen (Poland) U Radwańska	6	6
(Italy) A-R Vaideanu (Italy) E Zanchetta	3	2

=== Bottom half ===
First round
8	(United States) Madison Brengle (United States) Kimberly Couts	6	6
(Japan) Shiho Akita (South Korea) Sung-Hee Han	4	3
(Romania) Ionela-Andreea Iova (Serbia) Bojana Jovanovski	6^{2}	2
(United Kingdom) Jade Curtis (Poland) Katarzyna Piter	7^{7}	6
(Australia) Tyra Calderwood (Australia) Tammi Patterson	3	2
(Russia) Evgeniya Rodina (Russia) Arina Rodionova	6	6
(Hong Kong) Venise Chan (Hong Kong) Ling Zhang	6	4	3
4	(France) Alizé Cornet (Austria) Tamira Paszek	4	6	6
6	(Slovakia) Klaudia Boczová (Slovakia) Kristína Kučová	7	6
(New Zealand) Ellen Barry (Australia) Emelyn Starr	5	4
WC	(Australia) Michelle Brycki (Australia) Shayna McDowell	2	5
(Australia) Marija Mirkovic (Sweden) Sandra Roma	6	7
WC	(Australia) Isabella Holland (Australia) Sally Peers	2	6	4
(United Kingdom) Naomi Cavaday (Belgium) Tamaryn Hendler	6	2	6
(China) Xuan-Yu Guo (China) Yi-Miao Zhou	2	6^{5}
2	(Canada) Sharon Fichman (Czech Republic) Kateřina Vaňková	6	7^{7}

Second round
8	(United States) M Brengle (United States) K Couts	6	6
(United Kingdom) J Curtis (Poland) K Piter	2	2
(Russia) E Rodina (Russia) A Rodionova	6	6
4	(France) A Cornet (Austria) T Paszek	3	2
6	(Slovakia) K Boczová (Slovakia) K Kučová	7	6
(Australia) M Mirkovic (Sweden) S Roma	5	0
(United Kingdom) N Cavaday (Belgium) T Hendler	3	7	2
2	(Canada) S Fichman (Czech Republic) K Vaňková	6	5	6

Quarterfinals
8	(United States) M Brengle (United States) K Couts	6	1	3
(Russia) E Rodina (Russia) A Rodionova	2	6	6
6	(Slovakia) K Boczová (Slovakia) K Kučová	5	6	7
2	(Canada) S Fichman (Czech Republic) K Vaňková	7	0	5

Semifinals
(Russia) E Rodina (Russia) A Rodionova	4	6	7^{7}
6	(Slovakia) K Boczová (Slovakia) K Kučová	6	1	6^{3}

== Sources ==
- Main Draw
