= 2007 Australian Open – Women's singles =

Women's singles
- 2007 Australian Open

Final
- Champion: (United States) Serena Williams
- Runner-up: (Russia) Maria Sharapova
- Score: 6–1, 6–2

Details
- Draw: 128 (12Q / 8WC)
- Seeds: 32

Events
Singles	men	women		boys	girls
Doubles	men	women	mixed	boys	girls
WC Singles	men	women	quad
WC Doubles	men	women	quad
Legends	men	women	mixed
- Australian Open

Serena Williams defeated Maria Sharapova in the final, 6–1, 6–2 to win the women's singles tennis title at the 2007 Australian Open. It was her third Australian Open singles title and her eighth major singles title overall. Ranked as the world No. 81, she became the first unseeded player to win the title since Christine O'Neil in 1978. No. 1 seed (and World No. 2, respectively) Sharapova was nearly out of the tournament in her very first match against Camille Pin, despite being two points away to clinch the victory by potentially baggeling her opponent in the decider; she ultimately won 9–7 in the deciding set.

Amélie Mauresmo was the defending champion, but lost to Lucie Šafářová in the fourth round.

This marked the final Australian Open singles appearance for three-time champion Martina Hingis, who lost in the quarterfinals to Kim Clijsters.

== Seeds ==
1. (Russia) Maria Sharapova (final)
2. (France) Amélie Mauresmo (fourth round)
3. (Russia) Svetlana Kuznetsova (fourth round)
4. (Belgium) Kim Clijsters (semifinals)
5. (Russia) Nadia Petrova (third round)
6. (Switzerland) Martina Hingis (quarterfinals)
7. (Russia) Elena Dementieva (fourth round)
8. (Switzerland) Patty Schnyder (fourth round)
9. (Russia) Dinara Safina (third round)
10. (Czech Republic) Nicole Vaidišová (semifinals)
11. (Serbia) Jelena Janković (fourth round)
12. (Russia) Anna Chakvetadze (quarterfinals)
13. (Serbia) Ana Ivanovic (third round)
14. (Italy) Francesca Schiavone (second round)
15. (Slovakia) Daniela Hantuchová (fourth round)
16. (Israel) Shahar Pe'er (quarterfinals)
17. (Germany) Anna-Lena Grönefeld (second round)
18. (France) Marion Bartoli (second round)
19. (China) Li Na (fourth round)
20. (France) Tatiana Golovin (third round)
21. (Slovenia) Katarina Srebotnik (third round)
22. (Russia) Vera Zvonareva (fourth round)
23. (Japan) Ai Sugiyama (second round)
24. (Australia) Samantha Stosur (second round)
25. (Spain) Anabel Medina Garrigues (first round)
26. (Russia) Maria Kirilenko (third round)
27. (Italy) Mara Santangelo (first round)
28. (Italy) Flavia Pennetta (first round)
29. (Ukraine) Alona Bondarenko (third round)
30. (Italy) Tathiana Garbin (third round)
31. (China) Zheng Jie (first round)
32. (Greece) Eleni Daniilidou (first round)

== Daily review ==
=== Day 1: 15 January ===
The First day of play at Melbourne Park saw defending champion Amélie Mauresmo advance in straight sets to the second round, along with a string of Russian top-10 players (Kuznetsova, Petrova, Dementieva, among others). US Open semifinalist and Auckland champion Jelena Janković also sailed through in straight sets, but rising teen Nicole Vaidišová had to survive a tough three set challenge from Jill Craybas to advance. The 2003 and 2005 champion, Serena Williams, showed glimpses of the form that saw her rise to World No.1 when she swept past 27th seed Mara Santangelo 6–2 6–1 despite a relatively poor service percentage of 45%.

=== Day 2: 16 January ===
The second day was ravaged by heat in excess of 40 deg Celsius (104 deg Fahrenheit) causing the Extreme Heat Policy to be implemented. Many matches were delayed due and play continued merely on the two roofed courts. Maria Sharapova was playing in Rod Laver Arena, but before the Extreme Heat Policy came in use. As a result, the roof could not yet be closed and the match had to be played in full heat. She was particularly distressed during the match squandering a 1–0 lead in sets and a 5–0 lead in the decisive set, but eventually defeated Camille Pin 6–3, 4–6, 9–7, who was two points away from victory serving for the match at 7–6. Fourth seed Kim Clijsters, on the other hand, advanced soundly in twelve straight games 6–0 6–0, defeating Hobart finalist Vasilisa Bardina. Three time winner and six time finalist Martina Hingis also swept through with little difficulty, losing only two games to 2005 semifinalist Nathalie Dechy. Ana Ivanovic lost as many games to Vania King to advance to the second Round. The only seeds to fall were Eleni Daniilidou of Greece who fell 4–6 0–6 to Aiko Nakamura, and Flavia Pennetta, who lost to 2006 Hasselt finalist Kaia Kanepi of Estonia in straight sets. Former World No. 8, Australian wildcard Alicia Molik also advanced. 12 first round matches, including those of Patty Schnyder and Dinara Safina were postponed until Wednesday.

Seeded Players Out: Flavia Pennetta, Eleni Daniilidou

=== Day 3: 17 January ===
The third day's rain delays did not affect the woman's draw. Minor upsets of seeded players No. 14 Francesca Schiavone, No. 18 Marion Bartoli, and No. 23 Ai Sugiyama were at the hands of Lucie Šafářová, Victoria Azarenka, and Anastasiya Yakimova respectively. No. 2 Amélie Mauresmo advanced soundly 6–2, 6–2 against Olga Puchkova, as did No. 5 Nadia Petrova against Gisela Dulko 6–1, 6–2. Fellow Russian Svetlana Kuznetsova advanced 6–2, 6–1. Former World Number One, Serena Williams, advanced 7–6(4), 6–2 for the right to play Petrova in round three. At the end of Wednesday there were three American women remaining in the draw: Williams, Ashley Harkleroad and Laura Granville. Other seeded women to win were: No. 7 Elena Dementieva, No. 10 Nicole Vaidišová, No. 11 Jelena Janković, No. 16 Shahar Pe'er, No. 20 Tatiana Golovin, No. 21 Katarina Srebotnik, and No. 26 Maria Kirilenko. Unseeded Maria Elena Camerin of Italy and Czech Eva Birnerová also advanced to the third round.

=== Day 4: 18 January ===
Lighter rains than the previous day were experienced resulting in minimal delays. Women's Number One, Maria Sharapova advanced soundly over fellow Russian Anastasia Rodionova, 6–0, 6–3. Number 4 seed, Belgian Kim Clijsters also advanced in straight sets over Akiko Morigami, 6–3. 6–0. No. 6 Martina Hingis, No. 8 Patty Schnyder, No. 9 Dinara Safina, No. 19 Li Na, No. 22 Vera Zvonareva, No. 29 Alona Bondarenko, and No.30 Tathiana Garbin all passed their second round tests in straight sets as well. Other seeded women #12 Anna Chakvetadze, #13 Ana Ivanovic, and #15 Daniela Hantuchová required three sets to advances to the third round. Crowd favourite, Aussie Alicia Molik, clawed her way into the third round against Kaia Kanepi after being down one set, 1–6, 6–3, 6–2. The only seeded Australian woman in the draw, Samantha Stosur, on the other hand, fell to Croat Jelena Kostanić Tošić, 6–4, 2–6, 6–2. Young American Ashley Harkleroad upset number 17 Anna-Lena Grönefeld of Germany, 6–2, 6–2. Her compatriot Laura Granville was beaten by 12th seeded Anna Chakvetadze. Unseeded Japanese player Aiko Nakamura also advanced, defeating Indian Sania Mirza, 6–3, 6–2.

=== Day 5: 19 January ===
Amélie Mauresmo advanced in straight sets, 6–3, 6–1 over Czech Eva Birnerová to advance to the fourth round. She would move on to face Lucie Šafářová who won after only one set when opponent Anastasiya Yakimova had to retire. Former World Number One Serena Williams survived a miserable first set to defeat number 5 fiery Russian Nadia Petrova 1–6, 7–5, 6–3. Also advancing to be Serena's opponent was Serbian upstart Jelena Janković who won her match against Belarusian Victoria Azarenka soundly 6–3, 6–4. Number 3 Svetlana Kuznetsova advanced in straight sets over fellow Russian Maria Kirilenko 6–1, 6–4. Her opponent in the fourth round would be #16 Israeli Shahar Pe'er who survived a scare against #20 Tatiana Golovin being down a set to win 3–6, 7–5, 7–5 in one of the best matches on Day 5. Also advancing were number 7 Elena Dementieva and number 10 Nicole Vaidišová who won their matches in straight sets against unseeded Maria Elena Camerin and number 21 Katarina Srebotnik, respectively.

=== Day 6: 20 January ===
Number one Maria Sharapova continued easily moving through the draw after surviving her Day 2 scare due to heat. She defeated 30 seed Tathiana Garbin 6–3, 6–1. Her opponent in the fourth round would be fellow Russian Vera Zvonareva, who surprisingly defeated number 13 Ana Ivanovic soundly 6–1, 6–2. Australian fan favourite Alicia Molik won her first set 6–3 against Swiss Patty Schnyder on Rod Laver Arena, but could not continue her pace, as Schnyder won 3–6, 6–2, 6–0. Number 4 Kim Clijsters defeated Alona Bondarenko 6–3, 6–3 in a quick match. Number 6 Martina Hingis continued the great play of her comeback, winning 6–2, 6–1 against Aiko Nakamura. Clijsters, Hingis, and Schnyder will all benefit from playing on the roofed courts during the rain experienced on Day 6, as their opponents on Day 8 will have to play on Day 7 as well. The matches delayed by rain were: #9 Dinara Safina v #16 Li Na, #12 Anna Chakvetadze v Jelena Kostanić Tošić, and #15 Daniela Hantuchová v Ashley Harkleroad. The winners of those matches would play Hingis, Schnyder, and Clijsters, respectively. The roofed centre courts are always seen as an unfair advantage to the top players or the home country players, as they are able to complete matches on days affected by rain or heat, whereas their opponents are delayed and face playing on back-to-back days.

=== Day 7: 21 January ===
Day 7 saw five seeded players defeated by their opponents. Unseeded Lucie Šafářová advanced to the quarterfinals courtesy of a 6–4, 6–3 surprising upset of defending champion and number two seed Amélie Mauresmo. Her opponent in the next round will be tenth-seed Nicole Vaidišová who posted a 6–3, 6–3 upset of seventh-seed Elena Dementieva. Rising star Israeli Shahar Pe'er caused another upset by winning a 6–4, 6–2 over third-seeded Russian Svetlana Kuznetsova to become the first Israeli woman to make a major quarter-final. Her opponent in the quarterfinals will be Serena Williams, who is enjoying her current role as a loose cannon, defeating eleventh-seed Jelena Janković in a 6–3, 6–2 win. The last remaining Asian representative, nineteenth-seed Li Na, won in a 6–2, 6–2 decision over ninth-seed Dinara Safina to advance to the fourth round. Twelfth-seed Anna Chakvetadze won against Croat Jelena Kostanić Tošić 6–4, 6–4. The young Ashley Harkleroad nearly caused another upset but failed to, with fifteenth-seed Daniela Hantuchová winning the match 6–7, 7–5, 6–3. The Li, Chakvetadze, and Hantuchová matches were delayed from day 6.

=== Day 8: 22 January ===
The other four fourth round matches all took the court on the eighth day, with three of the top eight seeds in play advancing. Top seed Maria Sharapova was pushed to two close sets by fellow Russian Vera Zvonareva but eventually prevailed 7–5, 6–4. Fourth-seeded Belgian Kim Clijsters beat Daniela Hantuchová, who was playing for the second day in a row 6–1 7–5 to advance to the quarterfinals, where she was drawn to face Martina Hingis, who needed three sets to battle past the number one ranked Chinese player Li Na after being a set down. She won 4–6, 6–3, 6–0. The final match of the day was the only women's match to be played on Melbourne Arena, with the others all being on Rod Laver Arena. There the twelfth-seeded Russian Anna Chakvetadze pulled off a surprisingly easy 6–4, 6–1 victory over former semi-finalist Patty Schnyder of Switzerland to advance to her first ever Grand Slam quarterfinal, and would next meet Sharapova.

=== Day 9: 23 January ===
The bottom half quarter-final line-up was scheduled to play today, with only two women's singles matches taking the court. The first pitted seven-time Grand Slam champion Serena Williams against Shahar Pe'er of Israel. The unseeded Williams lost the first set 6–3 but grew in confidence in the second set to take it 6–2 and push it to a deciding set. Pe'er looked on-form for victory when she went up 6–5 in the final set, and just a few points from her first major semi-final, but it was Williams who then showed her fighting spirit by winning the next three games to wrap up the 3–6, 6–2, 8–6 victory and become one of the ten lowest-ranked women in the Open Era to compete in a Grand Slam semi-final.

The other quarter-final followed after with Nicole Vaidišová beating compatriot Lucie Šafářová 6–1, 6–4 to make her second major semi-final after the 2006 French Open. Vaidišová completely overpowered her fellow Czech in the first set, needing just thirty minutes to take it and compiling a 14–4 winner to unforced error ratio. Although Šafářová gave more of a battle in the second set, Vaidišová was still too good for her and managed to close out the one hour eleven-minute match with ease. In the semi-finals she will face Serena Williams, the first meeting between the pair.

=== Day 10: 24 January ===
Top-seeded Maria Sharapova opened up play as the remaining four players in the top half of the draw took to the court. She was drawn to face another Russian Anna Chakvetadze. Sharapova showed her fighting spirit early on in the first set, coming back from 4–2 and 5–3 deficits to bring things to a first set tie-break, where she again fell behind at 5–3, before winning the last four points to take the first set 7–6(5). In the second set, Sharapova took several break point opportunities in the second set, before letting Chakvetadze back into the match but eventually she made it through to the semi-finals with a 7–6(5), 7–5 victory.

Taking to the court after was Belgian Kim Clijsters and Swiss Martina Hingis in the last quarter-final to be contested, and one of the most anticipated match-ups thus far in the tournament. Last year, Clijsters beat Hingis at exactly the same stage before losing to Amélie Mauresmo. The fourth-seed squandered the first set, making 23 unforced errors, but began to find her game in the second set. She raced to a 5–2 lead in the second set, but let it slip before eventually winning 6–4 to push it to a deciding set. Hingis raced off to an early 2–0 lead in the last set, but all energy had been drained from her and she lost six of the last seven games of the match to hand Clijsters the victory, despite having forty-two unforced errors less than the Belgian. The semi-finals will feature Maria Sharapova against Kim Clijsters.

=== Day 11: 25 January ===
Both semi-finals were on the schedule on Day 11, with Serena Williams against Nicole Vaidišová first to take the court. Vaidišová broke early on for a 2–0 lead, but she squandered that advantage. At 5–4, the Czech had a chance to serve out the first set and take the advantage, but Williams fought back to take it to a tie-break and take the first set. In the second set, Williams continued to dominate moving ahead 5–1 and just points from wrapping up the victory, but it was Vaidišová who showed her fighting spirit saving four match points at 5–3 to Williams and then saving another in the last game of the match before Williams finally wrapped up the 7–6(5), 6–4 victory by converting her sixth match point and reach her first Grand Slam final since her Australian Open win two years previously.

Immediately after, it was decided that she would face Maria Sharapova in the final, after the Russian ended the Australian Open career of Kim Clijsters, who is set to retire at the end of the season with a 6–4, 6–2 victory. The two broke each other constantly in the first set, with Clijsters eventually having the advantage at 4–3, before Sharapova reeled off six consecutive games to go up a set and 3–0. She held onto her serve for the rest of the match and broke once more in the last game to take the match and move into her third Grand Slam final.

=== Day 13: 27 January ===
The women's final was scheduled to be played on the Saturday, with two of the biggest stars on the WTA Tour in Maria Sharapova and Serena Williams set to face each other. The fans who expected a tough battle were eventually disappointed though, as Williams dominated the top-seeded Russian from start to finish. Her game was completely on form throughout the match, with Sharapova only managing to hold service once in the first set as Williams hit winner after winner. The second set was no different, although Sharapova managed to hold twice in the last set but Williams was too good and prevailed 6–1, 6–2 to win her eighth Grand Slam title and her third Australian Open title. At the trophy presentation, Williams dedicated her win to Yetunde Price, her elder half-sister who was shot in September 2003. Williams became the third-lowest-ranked major titlist since 1975, after Evonne Goolagong and Chris O'Neil who won here in 1977 and 1978 respectively.

== Draw ==
Key

- Q = Qualifier
- WC = Wild card
- LL = Lucky loser
- Alt = Alternate
- ITF = ITF entry
- PR = Protected ranking
- SR = Special ranking
- SE = Special exempt
- JE = Junior exempt
- JR = Junior Accelerator Programme entrant
- CO = College Accelerator Programme entrant
- NG = Next Gen Accelerator Program entrant
- w/o = Walkover
- r = Retired
- d = Defaulted

=== Finals ===
Quarterfinals
1	(Russia) Maria Sharapova	7^{7}	7
12	(Russia) Anna Chakvetadze	6^{5}	5
4	(Belgium) Kim Clijsters	3	6	6
6	(Switzerland) Martina Hingis	6	4	3
(United States) Serena Williams	3	6	8
16	(Israel) Shahar Pe'er	6	2	6
10	(Czech Republic) Nicole Vaidišová	6	6
(Czech Republic) Lucie Šafářová	1	4

Semifinals
1	(Russia) Maria Sharapova	6	6
4	(Belgium) Kim Clijsters	4	2
(United States) Serena Williams	7^{7}	6
10	(Czech Republic) Nicole Vaidišová	6^{5}	4

Final
1	(Russia) Maria Sharapova	1	2
(United States) Serena Williams	6	6

=== Top half ===
==== Section 1 ====
First round
1	(Russia) M Sharapova	6	4	9
(France) C Pin	3	6	7
(Italy) R Vinci	3	1
(Russia) A Rodionova	6	6
Q	(Czech Republic) R Voráčová	7	6
(United States) M Shaughnessy	5	3
(Switzerland) E Gagliardi	6	2	1
30	(Italy) T Garbin	3	6	6
22	(Russia) V Zvonareva	6	6
(Israel) T Obziler	3	4
Q	(Austria) T Paszek	6	6
(France) S Bremond	1	4
(Uzbekistan) V Lepchenko	7	3	2
(Poland) A Radwańska	5	6	6
(United States) V King	2	0
13	(Serbia) A Ivanovic	6	6

Second round
1	(Russia) M Sharapova	6	6
(Russia) A Rodionova	0	3
Q	(Czech Republic) R Voráčová	1	5
30	(Italy) T Garbin	6	7
22	(Russia) V Zvonareva	6	6
Q	(Austria) T Paszek	1	3
(Poland) A Radwańska	2	6	2
13	(Serbia) A Ivanovic	6	3	6

Third round
1	(Russia) M Sharapova	6	6
30	(Italy) T Garbin	3	1
22	(Russia) V Zvonareva	6	6
13	(Serbia) A Ivanovic	1	2

Fourth round
1	(Russia) M Sharapova	7	6
22	(Russia) V Zvonareva	5	4

==== Section 2 ====
First round
12	(Russia) A Chakvetadze	6	7
(Austria) S Bammer	4	5
(Ukraine) Y Beygelzimer	2	3
(United States) L Granville	6	6
WC	(Australia) S Ferguson	5	3
(Croatia) J Kostanić Tošić	7	6
Q	(Czech Republic) K Zakopalová	3	1
24	(Australia) S Stosur	6	6
28	(Italy) F Pennetta	5	6^{3}
(Estonia) K Kanepi	7	7^{7}
(Chinese Taipei) Y-j Chan	2	6^{4}
WC	(Australia) A Molik	6	7^{7}
Q	(Slovenia) A Klepač	3	6	1
(China) S Peng	6	4	6
WC	(United States) M Brengle	3	4
8	(Switzerland) P Schnyder	6	6

Second round
12	(Russia) A Chakvetadze	6	5	6
(United States) L Granville	2	7	1
(Croatia) J Kostanić Tošić	6	2	6
24	(Australia) S Stosur	4	6	2
(Estonia) K Kanepi	6	3	2
WC	(Australia) A Molik	1	6	6
(China) S Peng	5	3
8	(Switzerland) P Schnyder	7	6

Third round
12	(Russia) A Chakvetadze	6	6
(Croatia) J Kostanić Tošić	4	4
WC	(Australia) A Molik	6	2	0
8	(Switzerland) P Schnyder	3	6	6

Fourth round
12	(Russia) A Chakvetadze	6	6
8	(Switzerland) P Schnyder	4	1

==== Section 3 ====
First round
4	(Belgium) K Clijsters	6	6
(Russia) V Bardina	0	0
(Japan) A Morigami	7	2	6
(Bulgaria) T Pironkova	5	6	4
(Australia) N Pratt	7^{10}	4	0
(France) V Razzano	6^{8}	6	6
Q	(France) S Cohen-Aloro	1	6^{6}
29	(Ukraine) A Bondarenko	6	7^{8}
17	(Germany) A-L Grönefeld	6	6
Q	(Czech Republic) S Záhlavová	4	1
(United States) A Harkleroad	6	6
(China) M Yuan	3	0
(France) É Loit	6	4	6
(France) A Rezaï	3	6	3
Q	(France) A Cornet	4	1
15	(Slovakia) D Hantuchová	6	6

Second round
4	(Belgium) K Clijsters	6	6
(Japan) A Morigami	3	0
(France) V Razzano	3	4
29	(Ukraine) A Bondarenko	6	6
17	(Germany) A-L Grönefeld	2	2
(United States) A Harkleroad	6	6
(France) É Loit	6	3	4
15	(Slovakia) D Hantuchová	4	6	6

Third round
4	(Belgium) K Clijsters	6	6
29	(Ukraine) A Bondarenko	3	3
(United States) A Harkleroad	7^{8}	5	4
15	(Slovakia) D Hantuchová	6^{6}	7	6

Fourth round
4	(Belgium) K Clijsters	6	7
15	(Slovakia) D Hantuchová	1	5

==== Section 4 ====
First round
9	(Russia) D Safina	7^{7}	6
(Russia) E Bychkova	6^{5}	1
WC	(France) Y Fedossova	7	6
(Colombia) C Castaño	5	4
Q	(United States) A Rolle	3	4
(Spain) L Domínguez Lino	6	6
PR	(Russia) E Bovina	4	3
19	(China) N Li	6	6
32	(Greece) E Daniilidou	4	0
(Japan) A Nakamura	6	6
(Ukraine) O Savchuk	3	5
(India) S Mirza	6	7
Q	(Russia) A Kudryavseva	4	6	9
(Finland) E Laine	6	2	7
(France) N Dechy	0	2
6	(Switzerland) M Hingis	6	6

Second round
9	(Russia) D Safina	6	6
WC	(France) Y Fedossova	3	2
(Spain) L Domínguez Lino	0	2
19	(China) N Li	6	6
(Japan) A Nakamura	6	6
(India) S Mirza	3	2
Q	(Russia) A Kudryavseva	2	2
6	(Switzerland) M Hingis	6	6

Third round
9	(Russia) D Safina	2	2
19	(China) N Li	6	6
(Japan) A Nakamura	2	1
6	(Switzerland) M Hingis	6	6

Fourth round
19	(China) N Li	6	3	0
6	(Switzerland) M Hingis	4	6	6

=== Bottom half ===
==== Section 5 ====
First round
5	(Russia) N Petrova	6	6
(Thailand) T Tanasugarn	3	2
(Argentina) G Dulko	6	6
(China) T Sun	2	2
(Netherlands) M Krajicek	4	3
Q	(Luxembourg) A Kremer	6	6
(United States) S Williams	6	6
27	(Italy) M Santangelo	2	1
18	(France) M Bartoli	6	6
(Russia) V Dushevina	0	3
(Belarus) V Azarenka	6	5	6
(Ukraine) Y Fedak	2	7	4
(Hungary) M Czink	6	1	7
(Spain) V Ruano Pascual	1	6	9
(Canada) A Wozniak	3	3
11	(Serbia) J Janković	6	6

Second round
5	(Russia) N Petrova	6	6
(Argentina) G Dulko	1	2
Q	(Luxembourg) A Kremer	6^{4}	2
(United States) S Williams	7^{7}	6
18	(France) M Bartoli	0	5
(Belarus) V Azarenka	6	7
(Spain) V Ruano Pascual	2	2
11	(Serbia) J Janković	6	6

Third round
5	(Russia) N Petrova	6	5	3
(United States) S Williams	1	7	6
(Belarus) V Azarenka	3	4
11	(Serbia) J Janković	6	6

Fourth round
(United States) S Williams	6	6
11	(Serbia) J Janković	3	2

==== Section 6 ====
First round
16	(Israel) S Pe'er	6	6
(Italy) R Oprandi	1	3
(Romania) E Gallovits	6	4	2
(United States) M Tu	2	6	6
(Czech Republic) Z Ondrášková	6	6
(Argentina) C Fernández	4	2
(Israel) A Smashnova	3	1
20	(France) T Golovin	6	6
26	(Russia) M Kirilenko	3	6	6
(Croatia) K Šprem	6	3	1
Q	(Ukraine) J Vakulenko	6	4	6
(Russia) E Likhovtseva	0	6	3
WC	(Uzbekistan) I Tulyaganova	1	4
WC	(Australia) M Adamczak	6	6
WC	(Australia) J Moore	2	0
3	(Russia) S Kuznetsova	6	6

Second round
16	(Israel) S Pe'er	6	6
(United States) M Tu	3	0
(Czech Republic) Z Ondrášková	2	0
20	(France) T Golovin	6	6
26	(Russia) M Kirilenko	4	6	6
Q	(Ukraine) J Vakulenko	6	3	4
WC	(Australia) M Adamczak	2	1
3	(Russia) S Kuznetsova	6	6

Third round
16	(Israel) S Pe'er	3	7	7
20	(France) T Golovin	6	5	5
26	(Russia) M Kirilenko	1	4
3	(Russia) S Kuznetsova	6	6

Fourth round
16	(Israel) S Pe'er	6	6
3	(Russia) S Kuznetsova	4	2

==== Section 7 ====
First round
7	(Russia) E Dementieva	6	6
(France) S Foretz	1	2
(Germany) M Müller	6	6
Q	(Argentina) J Cravero	0	3
(Italy) ME Camerin	6	6
(Belgium) K Flipkens	2	2
(Russia) E Vesnina	6^{7}	6	6
25	(Spain) A Medina Garrigues	7^{9}	1	1
21	(Slovenia) K Srebotnik	4	6	7
WC	(Australia) C Dellacqua	6	2	5
(Czech Republic) I Benešová	6^{3}	6	6
(Russia) G Voskoboeva	7^{7}	1	4
(Slovakia) J Gajdošová	3	4
(Venezuela) M Sequera	6	6
(United States) J Craybas	4	7	1
10	(Czech Republic) N Vaidišová	6	5	6

Second round
7	(Russia) E Dementieva	7	3	6
(Germany) M Müller	5	6	0
(Italy) ME Camerin	4	6	8
(Russia) E Vesnina	6	3	6
21	(Slovenia) K Srebotnik	7^{7}	6^{6}	6
(Czech Republic) I Benešová	6^{0}	7^{8}	1
(Venezuela) M Sequera	2	1
10	(Czech Republic) N Vaidišová	6	6

Third round
7	(Russia) E Dementieva	6	6
(Italy) ME Camerin	1	3
21	(Slovenia) K Srebotnik	4	4
10	(Czech Republic) N Vaidišová	6	6

Fourth round
7	(Russia) E Dementieva	3	3
10	(Czech Republic) N Vaidišová	6	6

==== Section 8 ====
First round
14	(Italy) F Schiavone	6	6
(Germany) S Klösel	4	4
(Czech Republic) L Šafářová	6	6
(Italy) A Brianti	3	1
(Spain) L Pous Tió	2	6	5
(Belarus) A Yakimova	6	4	7
(Sweden) S Arvidsson	3	4
23	(Japan) A Sugiyama	6	6
31	(China) J Zheng	6	6^{1}	4
(Germany) J Schruff	4	7^{7}	6
(Slovakia) M Suchá	5	3
(Czech Republic) E Birnerová	7	6
(Poland) M Domachowska	2	4
(Russia) O Puchkova	6	6
(United States) S Perry	3	4
2	(France) A Mauresmo	6	6

Second round
14	(Italy) F Schiavone	3	3
(Czech Republic) L Šafářová	6	6
(Belarus) A Yakimova	6	2	10
23	(Japan) A Sugiyama	2	6	8
(Germany) J Schruff	2	6	2
(Czech Republic) E Birnerová	6	2	6
(Russia) O Puchkova	2	2
2	(France) A Mauresmo	6	6

Third round
(Czech Republic) L Šafářová	6
(Belarus) A Yakimova	3	r
(Czech Republic) E Birnerová	3	1
2	(France) A Mauresmo	6	6

Fourth round
(Czech Republic) L Šafářová	6	6
2	(France) A Mauresmo	4	3

== Championship match statistics ==
Category	(United States) S. Williams	(Russia) Sharapova
1st serve %	33/49 (67%)	24/47 (51%)
1st serve points won	26 of 33 = 79%	16 of 24 = 67%
2nd serve points won	10 of 16 = 63%	6 of 23 = 26%
Total service points won	36 of 49 = 73.47%	22 of 47 = 46.81%
Aces	7	3
Double faults	2	6
Winners	28	12
Unforced errors	11	13
Net points won	4 of 5 = 80%	3 of 4 = 75%
Break points converted	4 of 6 = 67%	0 of 2 = 0%
Return points won	25 of 47 = 53%	13 of 49 = 27%
Total points won	61	35

Preceded by 2006 US Open – Women's singles	Grand Slam women's singles	Succeeded by 2007 French Open – Women's singles
