= 2007 Australian Open – Women's doubles =

Women's doubles
- 2007 Australian Open

Final
- Champion: (Zimbabwe) Cara Black (South Africa) Liezel Huber
- Runner-up: (Chinese Taipei) Chan Yung-jan (Chinese Taipei) Chuang Chia-jung
- Score: 6–4, 6–7^{(4–7)}, 6–1

Details
- Draw: 64
- Seeds: 16

Events
| Singles | men | women | | boys | girls |
| Doubles | men | women | mixed | boys | girls |
| WC Singles | men | women | quad |
| WC Doubles | men | women | quad |
| Legends | men | women | mixed |
- Australian Open

Yan Zi and Zheng Jie were the defending champions but lost in the semifinals to Chan Yung-jan and Chuang Chia-jung.
Cara Black and Liezel Huber won the title, defeating Chan Yung-jan and Chuang Chia-jung in the final 6–4, 6–7^{(4–7)}, 6–1.

== Seeds ==
1. (United States) Lisa Raymond / (Australia) Samantha Stosur (semifinals)
2. (China) Yan Zi / (China) Zheng Jie (semifinals)
3. (Zimbabwe) Cara Black / (South Africa) Liezel Huber (champions)
4. (Spain) Virginia Ruano Pascual / (Argentina) Paola Suárez (first round)
5. (Russia) Dinara Safina / (Slovenia) Katarina Srebotnik (third round)
6. (Czech Republic) Daniela Hantuchová / (Japan) Ai Sugiyama (quarterfinals)
7. (Germany) Anna-Lena Grönefeld / (United States) Meghann Shaughnessy (quarterfinals)
8. (France) Nathalie Dechy / (Russia) Vera Zvonareva (third round)
9. (United States) Corina Morariu / (Australia) Rennae Stubbs (first round)
10. (Spain) Anabel Medina Garrigues / (India) Sania Mirza (third round)
11. (France) Marion Bartoli / (Israel) Shahar Pe'er (first round)
12. (Italy) Maria Elena Camerin (Argentina) Gisela Dulko (third round)
13. (Russia) Elena Likhovtseva (Russia) Elena Vesnina (first round)
14. (Russia) Elena Dementieva / (Italy) Flavia Pennetta (third round)
15. (Slovakia) Janette Husárová / (Serbia) Jelena Janković (first round)
16. (Greece) Eleni Daniilidou (Germany) Jasmin Wöhr (third round)

== Draw ==
Key

- Q = Qualifier
- WC = Wild card
- LL = Lucky loser
- Alt = Alternate
- ITF = ITF entry
- PR = Protected ranking
- SR = Special ranking
- SE = Special exempt
- JE = Junior exempt
- JR = Junior Accelerator Programme entrant
- CO = College Accelerator Programme entrant
- NG = Next Gen Accelerator Program entrant
- w/o = Walkover
- r = Retired
- d = Defaulted

=== Finals ===
Quarterfinals
1 | (United States) Lisa Raymond (Australia) Samantha Stosur | 6 | 6
7 | (Germany) Anna-Lena Grönefeld (United States) Meghann Shaughnessy | 3 | 2
3 | (Zimbabwe) Cara Black (South Africa) Liezel Huber | 6 | 6
6 | (Slovakia) Daniela Hantuchová (Japan) Ai Sugiyama | 1 | 4
WC | (Chinese Taipei) Chan Yung-jan (Chinese Taipei) Chuang Chia-jung | 6 | 6
(United States) Ashley Harkleroad (Russia) Galina Voskoboeva | 0 | 0
(China) Sun Shengnan (China) Sun Tiantian | 3 | 6^{5}
2 | (China) Yan Zi (China) Zheng Jie | 6 | 7^{7}

Semifinals
1 | (United States) Lisa Raymond (Australia) Samantha Stosur | 4 | 6 | 2
3 | (Zimbabwe) Cara Black (South Africa) Liezel Huber | 6 | 4 | 6
WC | (Chinese Taipei) Chan Yung-jan (Chinese Taipei) Chuang Chia-jung | 6 | 6
2 | (China) Yan Zi (China) Zheng Jie | 3 | 4

Final
3 | (Zimbabwe) Cara Black (South Africa) Liezel Huber | 6 | 6^{4} | 6
WC | (Chinese Taipei) Chan Yung-jan (Chinese Taipei) Chuang Chia-jung | 4 | 7^{7} | 1

=== Top half ===
==== Section 1 ====
First round
1 | (United States) L Raymond (Australia) S Stosur | 6 | 6
(South Africa) N Grandin (France) C Pin | 1 | 3
(Czech Republic) G Navrátilová (Czech Republic) H Šromová | 3 | 3
(Sweden) S Arvidsson (Czech Republic) V Uhlířová | 6 | 6
WC | (Australia) T Musgrave (Australia) C Wheeler | 1 | 4
(China) N Li (China) S Peng | 6 | 6
(Italy) F Schiavone (Switzerland) P Schnyder | 4 | 7^{7} | 6
13 | (Russia) E Likhovtseva (Russia) E Vesnina | 6 | 6^{2} | 1
12 | (Italy) ME Camerin (Argentina) G Dulko | 7 | 1 | 7^{7}
(United States) L Granville (United States) C Gullickson | 5 | 6 | 6^{2}
WC | (Australia) D Dominikovic (Australia) S Ferguson | 4 | 3
(Slovakia) J Gajdošová (Australia) B Stewart | 6 | 6
(Ukraine) A Bondarenko (Ukraine) K Bondarenko | 6 | 6
(Czech Republic) L Šafářová (Thailand) T Tanasugarn | 4 | 3
(Estonia) K Kanepi (Israel) A Smashnova | 5 | 6 | 0
7 | (Germany) A-L Grönefeld (United States) M Shaughnessy | 7 | 4 | 6

Second round
1 | (United States) L Raymond (Australia) S Stosur | 6 | 7
(Sweden) S Arvidsson (Czech Republic) V Uhlířová | 3 | 5
(China) N Li (China) S Peng | 4 | 4
(Italy) F Schiavone (Switzerland) P Schnyder | 6 | 6
12 | (Italy) ME Camerin (Argentina) G Dulko | 6 | 6
(Slovakia) J Gajdošová (Australia) B Stewart | 3 | 2
(Ukraine) A Bondarenko (Ukraine) K Bondarenko | 7^{7} | 3 | 3
7 | (Germany) A-L Grönefeld (United States) M Shaughnessy | 6^{5} | 6 | 6

Third round
1 | (United States) L Raymond (Australia) S Stosur | 3 | 6 | 6
(Italy) F Schiavone (Switzerland) P Schnyder | 6 | 2 | 3
12 | (Italy) ME Camerin (Argentina) G Dulko | 6 | 2 | 1
7 | (Germany) A-L Grönefeld (United States) M Shaughnessy | 3 | 6 | 6

Quarterfinals
1 | (United States) L Raymond (Australia) S Stosur | 6 | 6
7 | (Germany) A-L Grönefeld (United States) M Shaughnessy | 3 | 2

==== Section 2 ====
First round
3 | (Zimbabwe) C Black (South Africa) L Huber | 6 | 6
(Russia) A Rodionova (Romania) A Vanc | 4 | 4
(Finland) E Laine (Czech Republic) N Vaidišová | 6^{6} | 2
(United States) B Mattek (United States) S Perry | 7^{8} | 6
(Australia) L Breadmore (Australia) E Hewson | 5 | 3
(Colombia) C Castaño (United States) J Craybas | 7 | 6
(Chinese Taipei) S-w Hsieh (China) T Li | 6 | 4 | 3
16 | (Greece) E Daniilidou (Germany) J Wöhr | 3 | 6 | 6
10 | (Spain) A Medina Garrigues (India) S Mirza | 6 | 6
(Germany) S Klösel (France) A Rezaï | 1 | 4
(Ukraine) Y Beygelzimer (Spain) L Domínguez Lino | 2 | 1
(Russia) E Bychkova (Germany) M Müller | 6 | 6
(Italy) R Oprandi (Germany) J Schruff | 3 | 1
(Netherlands) M Krajicek (Hungary) Á Szávay | 6 | 6
WC | (France) T Golovin (Australia) A Molik | 4 | 1
6 | (Slovakia) D Hantuchová (Japan) A Sugiyama | 6 | 6

Second round
3 | (Zimbabwe) C Black (South Africa) L Huber | 7 | 6
(United States) B Mattek (United States) S Perry | 5 | 0
(Colombia) C Castaño (United States) J Craybas | 7^{7} | 1 | 4
16 | (Greece) E Daniilidou (Germany) J Wöhr | 6^{3} | 6 | 6
10 | (Spain) A Medina Garrigues (India) S Mirza | 6 | 6
(Russia) E Bychkova (Germany) M Müller | 3 | 4
(Netherlands) M Krajicek (Hungary) Á Szávay | 3 | 2
6 | (Slovakia) D Hantuchová (Japan) A Sugiyama | 6 | 6

Third round
3 | (Zimbabwe) C Black (South Africa) L Huber | 6 | 6
16 | (Greece) E Daniilidou (Germany) J Wöhr | 4 | 3
10 | (Spain) A Medina Garrigues (India) S Mirza | 6^{5} | 7^{7} | 2
6 | (Slovakia) D Hantuchová (Japan) A Sugiyama | 7^{7} | 6^{5} | 6

Quarterfinals
3 | (Zimbabwe) C Black (South Africa) L Huber | 6 | 6
6 | (Slovakia) D Hantuchová (Japan) A Sugiyama | 1 | 4

=== Bottom half ===
==== Section 3 ====
First round
5 | (Russia) D Safina (Slovenia) K Srebotnik | 6 | 6
(Russia) A Chakvetadze (Italy) M Santangelo | 2 | 0
(Czech Republic) I Benešová (Czech Republic) B Záhlavová-Strýcová | 2 | 4
(France) S Brémond (France) A Mauresmo | 6 | 6
(Ukraine) Y Fedak (Ukraine) T Perebiynis | 5 | 7 | 3
WC | (Chinese Taipei) Y-j Chan (Chinese Taipei) C-j Chuang | 7 | 5 | 6
(Italy) T Garbin (Italy) R Vinci | 6 | 4 | 6
11 | (France) M Bartoli (Israel) S Pe'er | 4 | 6 | 3
15 | (Slovakia) J Husárová (Serbia) J Janković | 5 | 1
(Switzerland) M Hingis (Russia) S Kuznetsova | 7 | 6
(Czech Republic) L Hradecká (Czech Republic) R Voráčová | 4 | 7 | 4
(Russia) M Kirilenko (Russia) V Dushevina | 6 | 5 | 6
(United States) A Harkleroad (Russia) G Voskoboeva | 6 | 7
(Venezuela) M Sequera (United States) M Tu | 3 | 5
(France) É Loit (Australia) N Pratt | 3 | 6 | 7
4 | (Spain) V Ruano Pascual (Argentina) P Suárez | 6 | 1 | 5

Second round
5 | (Russia) D Safina (Slovenia) K Srebotnik | 6 | 7^{7}
(France) S Brémond (France) A Mauresmo | 3 | 6^{3}
WC | (Chinese Taipei) Y-j Chan (Chinese Taipei) C-j Chuang | 4 | 7^{7} | 6
(Italy) T Garbin (Italy) R Vinci | 6 | 6^{5} | 2
(Switzerland) M Hingis (Russia) S Kuznetsova | 2 | 3
(Russia) M Kirilenko (Russia) V Dushevina | 6 | 6
(United States) A Harkleroad (Russia) G Voskoboeva | 6 | 6
(France) É Loit (Australia) N Pratt | 3 | 1

Third round
5 | (Russia) D Safina (Slovenia) K Srebotnik | 7 | 2 | 4
WC | (Chinese Taipei) Y-j Chan (Chinese Taipei) C-j Chuang | 5 | 6 | 6
(Russia) M Kirilenko (Russia) V Dushevina | 6^{5} | 6 | 3
(United States) A Harkleroad (Russia) G Voskoboeva | 7^{7} | 0 | 6

Quarterfinals
WC | (Chinese Taipei) Y-j Chan (Chinese Taipei) C-j Chuang | 6 | 6
(United States) A Harkleroad (Russia) G Voskoboeva | 0 | 0

==== Section 4 ====
First round
8 | (France) N Dechy (Russia) V Zvonareva | 6 | 7
(Uzbekistan) V Lepchenko (Russia) O Puchkova | 1 | 5
(United States) V King (Croatia) J Kostanić Tošić | 6 | 6
(Poland) M Domachowska (Poland) A Radwańska | 4 | 2
(France) S Foretz (Poland) K Jans | 2 | 4
(China) S Sun (China) T Sun | 6 | 6
(Russia) E Bovina (Russia) A Kudryavtseva | 6 | 6
9 | (United States) C Morariu (Australia) R Stubbs | 3 | 3
14 | (Russia) E Dementieva (Italy) F Pennetta | 4 | 6 | 6
(Japan) A Morigami (Japan) A Nakamura | 6 | 3 | 4
(Austria) S Bammer (Czech Republic) E Birnerová | 4 | 6 | 3
(Bulgaria) T Pironkova (Slovakia) M Suchá | 6 | 3 | 6
WC | (Australia) C Dellacqua (Australia) J Moore | 6 | 3 | 1
(Russia) V Bardina (Poland) A Rosolska | 3 | 6 | 6
WC | (Australia) M Adamczak (Australia) E Dominikovic | 1 | 0
2 | (China) Z Yan (China) J Zheng | 6 | 6

Second round
8 | (France) N Dechy (Russia) V Zvonareva | 6^{4} | 6 | 6
(United States) V King (Croatia) J Kostanić Tošić | 7^{7} | 4 | 0
(Russia) E Bovina (Russia) A Kudryavtseva | 2 | 6 | 6
(China) S Sun (China) T Sun | 6 | 1 | 3
14 | (Russia) E Dementieva (Italy) F Pennetta | 6 | 6
(Bulgaria) T Pironkova (Slovakia) M Suchá | 1 | 0
(Russia) V Bardina (Poland) A Rosolska | 1 | 1
2 | (China) Z Yan (China) J Zheng | 6 | 6

Third round
8 | (France) N Dechy (Russia) V Zvonareva | 3 | 3
(China) S Sun (China) T Sun | 6 | 6
14 | (Russia) E Dementieva (Italy) F Pennetta | 6 | 1 | 2
2 | (China) Z Yan (China) J Zheng | 4 | 6 | 6

Quarterfinals
(China) S Sun (China) T Sun | 3 | 4
2 | (China) Z Yan (China) J Zheng | 6 | 6
