= 2007 Australian Open – Men's doubles =

Men's doubles
- 2007 Australian Open

Final
- Champion: (United States) Bob Bryan (United States) Mike Bryan
- Runner-up: (Sweden) Jonas Björkman (Belarus) Max Mirnyi
- Score: 7–5, 7–5

Details
- Draw: 64
- Seeds: 16

Events
| Singles | men | women | | boys | girls |
| Doubles | men | women | mixed | boys | girls |
| WC Singles | men | women | quad |
| WC Doubles | men | women | quad |
| Legends | men | women | mixed |
- Australian Open

Defending champions Bob and Mike Bryan retained the title, defeating Jonas Björkman and Max Mirnyi 7–5, 7–5 in the final.

== Seeds ==
1. (United States) Bob Bryan / (United States) Mike Bryan (champions)
2. (Sweden) Jonas Björkman / (Belarus) Max Mirnyi (final)
3. (The Bahamas) Mark Knowles / (Canada) Daniel Nestor (semifinals)
4. (Australia) Paul Hanley / (Zimbabwe) Kevin Ullyett (semifinals)
5. (Czech Republic) Martin Damm / (India) Leander Paes (third round)
6. (France) Fabrice Santoro / (Serbia) Nenad Zimonjić (quarterfinals)
7. (Israel) Jonathan Erlich / (Israel) Andy Ram (third round)
8. (Poland) Mariusz Fyrstenberg / (Poland) Marcin Matkowski (first round)
9. (Czech Republic) Lukáš Dlouhý / (Czech Republic) Pavel Vízner (second round)
10. (Austria) Julian Knowle / (Austria) Jürgen Melzer (third round)
11. (Sweden) Simon Aspelin / (South Africa) Chris Haggard (second round)
12. (Czech Republic) František Čermák / (Czech Republic) Jaroslav Levinský (third round)
13. (South Africa) Wesley Moodie / (Australia) Todd Perry (third round)
14. (Czech Republic) Leoš Friedl / (Germany) Michael Kohlmann (first round)
15. (Australia) Ashley Fisher / (United States) Tripp Phillips (second round)
16. (France) Arnaud Clément / (France) Michaël Llodra (first round)

== Draw ==
Key

- Q = Qualifier
- WC = Wild card
- LL = Lucky loser
- Alt = Alternate
- ITF = ITF entry
- PR = Protected ranking
- SR = Special ranking
- SE = Special exempt
- JE = Junior exempt
- JR = Junior Accelerator Programme entrant
- CO = College Accelerator Programme entrant
- NG = Next Gen Accelerator Program entrant
- w/o = Walkover
- r = Retired
- d = Defaulted

=== Finals ===
Quarter-finals
1 | (United States) Bob Bryan (United States) Mike Bryan | 7 | 7
(South Africa) Jeff Coetzee (Netherlands) Rogier Wassen | 5 | 5
3 | (The Bahamas) Mark Knowles (Canada) Daniel Nestor | 6 | 6
6 | (France) Fabrice Santoro (Serbia) Nenad Zimonjić | 3 | 3
(France) Julien Benneteau (France) Nicolas Mahut | 6^{4} | 2
4 | (Australia) Paul Hanley (Zimbabwe) Kevin Ullyett | 7 | 6
(India) Mahesh Bhupathi (Czech Republic) Radek Štěpánek | 3 | 2
2 | (Sweden) Jonas Björkman (Belarus) Max Mirnyi | 6 | 6

Semi-finals
1 | (United States) Bob Bryan (United States) Mike Bryan | 2 | 6 | 7
3 | (The Bahamas) Mark Knowles (Canada) Daniel Nestor | 6 | 3 | 5
4 | (Australia) Paul Hanley (Zimbabwe) Kevin Ullyett | 6 | 5 | 6^{8}
2 | (Sweden) Jonas Björkman (Belarus) Max Mirnyi | 2 | 7 | 7

Final
1 | (United States) Bob Bryan (United States) Mike Bryan | 7 | 7
2 | (Sweden) Jonas Björkman (Belarus) Max Mirnyi | 5 | 5

=== Top half ===
==== Section 1 ====
First round
1 | (United States) B Bryan (United States) M Bryan | 6 | 6
(Australia) A Coelho (Australia) A Jones | 1 | 1
(Czech Republic) J Hernych (United States) V Spadea | 6 | 3 | 6
(Italy) D Bracciali (Slovakia) D Hrbatý | 2 | 6 | 4
(France) M Gicquel (France) F Serra | 6 | 6
(Italy) D Sanguinetti (France) G Simon | 3 | 4
(Germany) S Greul (Germany) F Mayer | 4 | 4
13 | (South Africa) W Moodie (Australia) T Perry | 6 | 6
12 | (Czech Republic) F Čermák (Czech Republic) J Levinský | 6^{4} | 6 | 7
(Australia) P Baccanello (Australia) C Guccione | 7 | 3 | 6^{8}
(United States) E Butorac (United States) T Parrott | 4 | 6 | 7
(Switzerland) Y Allegro (Sweden) R Lindstedt | 6 | 4 | 6^{5}
(South Africa) J Coetzee (Netherlands) R Wassen | 7 | 6^{7} | 6
(Croatia) I Karlović (Croatia) L Zovko | 5 | 7 | 2
(Cyprus) M Baghdatis (Greece) K Economidis | 6 | 6
8 | (Poland) M Fyrstenberg (Poland) M Matkowski | 4 | 2

Second round
1 | (United States) B Bryan (United States) M Bryan | 6 | 6
(Czech Republic) J Hernych (United States) V Spadea | 1 | 2
(France) M Gicquel (France) F Serra | 3 | 4
13 | (South Africa) W Moodie (Australia) T Perry | 6 | 6
12 | (Czech Republic) F Čermák (Czech Republic) J Levinský | 7 | 3 | 6
(United States) E Butorac (United States) T Parrott | 6^{4} | 6 | 3
(South Africa) J Coetzee (Netherlands) R Wassen | 6 | 6
(Cyprus) M Baghdatis (Greece) K Economidis | 2 | 4

Third round
1 | (United States) B Bryan (United States) M Bryan | 6 | 7
13 | (South Africa) W Moodie (Australia) T Perry | 3 | 6^{5}
12 | (Czech Republic) F Čermák (Czech Republic) J Levinský | 6^{12} | 2
(South Africa) J Coetzee (Netherlands) R Wassen | 7 | 6

Quarter-finals
1 | (United States) B Bryan (United States) M Bryan | 7 | 7
(South Africa) J Coetzee (Netherlands) R Wassen | 5 | 5

==== Section 2 ====
First round
3 | (The Bahamas) M Knowles (Canada) D Nestor | 7 | 6
(Argentina) J Acasuso (Argentina) M Vassallo Argüello | 6^{1} | 4
(United States) A Delic (United States) M Fish | 7 | 6
(Australia) W Arthurs (Australia) P Luczak | 5 | 3
(Chinese Taipei) Y-h Lu (Thailand) D Udomchoke | 4 | 4
(Australia) J Kerr (Czech Republic) D Škoch | 6 | 6
(Australia) G Jones (Australia) B Klein | 4 | 0
15 | (Australia) A Fisher (United States) T Phillips | 6 | 6
10 | (Austria) J Knowle (Austria) J Melzer | 6 | 6
(Russia) I Andreev (Russia) I Kunitsyn | 4 | 4
(Spain) A Martín (Italy) P Starace | 3 | 7 | 7
(United States) P Goldstein (United States) J Thomas | 6 | 6^{5} | 5
(Russia) E Korolev (Russia) M Youzhny | 4 | 4
(Australia) C Ball (Australia) A Feeney | 6 | 6
(United States) R Kendrick (United States) B Reynolds | 5 | 5
6 | (France) F Santoro (Serbia) N Zimonjić | 7 | 7

Second round
3 | (The Bahamas) M Knowles (Canada) D Nestor | 6 | 6
(United States) A Delic (United States) M Fish | 4 | 4
(Australia) J Kerr (Czech Republic) D Škoch | 5 | 7 | 7
15 | (Australia) A Fisher (United States) T Phillips | 7 | 6^{6} | 6^{3}
10 | (Austria) J Knowle (Austria) J Melzer | 6 | 6
(Spain) A Martín (Italy) P Starace | 4 | 2
(Australia) C Ball (Australia) A Feeney | 6 | 3 | 2
6 | (France) F Santoro (Serbia) N Zimonjić | 3 | 6 | 6

Third round
3 | (The Bahamas) M Knowles (Canada) D Nestor | 7 | 6
(Australia) J Kerr (Czech Republic) D Škoch | 5 | 2
10 | (Austria) J Knowle (Austria) J Melzer | 6^{4} | 3
6 | (France) F Santoro (Serbia) N Zimonjić | 7 | 6

Quarter-finals
3 | (The Bahamas) M Knowles (Canada) D Nestor | 6 | 6
6 | (France) F Santoro (Serbia) N Zimonjić | 3 | 3

=== Bottom half ===
==== Section 3 ====
First round
5 | (Czech Republic) M Damm (India) L Paes | 7 | 4 | 6
(Serbia) N Djokovic (Serbia) J Tipsarević | 6^{6} | 6 | 3
(Australia) N Healey (Australia) R Smeets | 6 | 7
(United States) K Kim (South Korea) H-t Lee | 1 | 6^{5}
(France) J Benneteau (France) N Mahut | 6 | 6
(Germany) B Becker (United Kingdom) J Murray | 4 | 2
(Canada) F Dancevic (Belgium) X Malisse | 6 | 6^{7} | 5
11 | (Sweden) S Aspelin (South Africa) C Haggard | 4 | 7 | 7
16 | (France) A Clément (France) M Llodra | 4 | 7 | 2
(Poland) Ł Kubot (Austria) O Marach | 6 | 6^{2} | 6
(Belgium) O Rochus (Belgium) K Vliegen | 6 | 7
(Argentina) M García (Argentina) S Prieto | 3 | 5
(Peru) L Horna (Ecuador) N Lapentti | 3 | 5
(Slovakia) M Mertiňák (Czech Republic) P Pála | 6 | 7
(Austria) A Peya (Germany) B Phau | 6 | 5 | 2
4 | (Australia) P Hanley (Zimbabwe) K Ullyett | 4 | 7 | 6

Second round
5 | (Czech Republic) M Damm (India) L Paes | 6 | 6
(Australia) N Healey (Australia) R Smeets | 4 | 2
(France) J Benneteau (France) N Mahut | 6 | 7
11 | (Sweden) S Aspelin (South Africa) C Haggard | 3 | 5
(Poland) Ł Kubot (Austria) O Marach | 6 | 6
(Belgium) O Rochus (Belgium) K Vliegen | 3 | 2
(Slovakia) M Mertiňák (Czech Republic) P Pála | 1 | 7 | 3
4 | (Australia) P Hanley (Zimbabwe) K Ullyett | 6 | 6^{5} | 6

Third round
5 | (Czech Republic) M Damm (India) L Paes | 5 | 6^{7}
(France) J Benneteau (France) N Mahut | 7 | 7
(Poland) Ł Kubot (Austria) O Marach | 3 | 4
4 | (Australia) P Hanley (Zimbabwe) K Ullyett | 6 | 6

Quarter-finals
(France) J Benneteau (France) N Mahut | 6^{4} | 2
4 | (Australia) P Hanley (Zimbabwe) K Ullyett | 7 | 6

==== Section 4 ====
First round
7 | (Israel) J Erlich (Israel) A Ram | 6 | 4 | 7
(Sweden) T Johansson (Finland) J Nieminen | 2 | 6 | 5
(United Kingdom) J Auckland (Australia) S Huss | 7 | 6^{6} | 7
(Germany) P Kohlschreiber (Austria) S Koubek | 6^{5} | 7 | 5
(India) M Bhupathi (Czech Republic) R Štěpánek | 6 | 6^{4} | 6
(France) S Grosjean (France) O Patience | 4 | 7 | 1
(Germany) C Kas (Germany) P Petzschner | 4 | 6 | 2
9 | (Czech Republic) L Dlouhý (Czech Republic) P Vízner | 6 | 4 | 6
14 | (Czech Republic) L Friedl (Germany) M Kohlmann | 4 | 4
(Czech Republic) T Cibulec (Germany) R Schüttler | 6 | 6
(Romania) A Pavel (Germany) A Waske | 6 | 7
(Spain) N Almagro (Spain) F Verdasco | 1 | 6^{1}
(Spain) R Ramírez Hidalgo (Argentina) S Roitman | 6 | 6
(Italy) L Azzaro (Italy) F Volandri | 3 | 3
(Germany) T Behrend (Spain) G García-López | 0 | 1
2 | (Sweden) J Björkman (Belarus) M Mirnyi | 6 | 6

Second round
7 | (Israel) J Erlich (Israel) A Ram | 6 | 1 | 6
(United Kingdom) J Auckland (Australia) S Huss | 1 | 6 | 1
(India) M Bhupathi (Czech Republic) R Štěpánek | 4 | 6 | 7
9 | (Czech Republic) L Dlouhý (Czech Republic) P Vízner | 6 | 3 | 6^{4}
(Czech Republic) T Cibulec (Germany) R Schüttler | 6^{5} | 0
(Romania) A Pavel (Germany) A Waske | 7 | 6
(Spain) R Ramírez Hidalgo (Argentina) S Roitman | 7 | 3 | 1
2 | (Sweden) J Björkman (Belarus) M Mirnyi | 5 | 6 | 6

Third round
7 | (Israel) J Erlich (Israel) A Ram | 6^{4} | 6 | 3
(India) M Bhupathi (Czech Republic) R Štěpánek | 7 | 4 | 6
(Romania) A Pavel (Germany) A Waske | 6^{0} | 4
2 | (Sweden) J Björkman (Belarus) M Mirnyi | 7 | 6

Quarter-finals
(India) M Bhupathi (Czech Republic) R Štěpánek | 3 | 2
2 | (Sweden) J Björkman (Belarus) M Mirnyi | 6 | 6
