= 2007 Australian Open – Men's singles =

Men's singles
- 2007 Australian Open

Final
- Champion: (Switzerland) Roger Federer
- Runner-up: (Chile) Fernando González
- Score: 7–6^{(7–2)}, 6–4, 6–4

Details
- Draw: 128
- Seeds: 32

Events
| Singles | men | women | | boys | girls |
| Doubles | men | women | mixed | boys | girls |
| WC Singles | men | women | quad |
| WC Doubles | men | women | quad |
| Legends | men | women | mixed |
- Australian Open

Defending champion Roger Federer defeated Fernando González in the final, 7–6^{(7–2)}, 6–4, 6–4 to win the men's singles tennis title at the 2007 Australian Open. It was his third Australian Open title and tenth major title overall. Federer did not lose a set during the tournament, the first man to do so at a major since Björn Borg at the 1980 French Open, and the first to do so at a major played on hardcourts. Also, Federer made a record-equaling seventh consecutive major final appearance (streak starting at the 2005 Wimbledon Championships), after Jack Crawford during the 1930s, and became the first man to reach eleven consecutive major semifinals (streak started at the 2004 Wimbledon Championships). González was the first Chilean to reach a major final since Marcelo Ríos in 1998.

This tournament marked the first major main-draw appearance for future US Open champion and world No. 3 Marin Čilić; he lost in the first round.

== Seeds ==
1. (Switzerland) Roger Federer (champion)
2. (Spain) Rafael Nadal (quarterfinals)
3. (Russia) Nikolay Davydenko (quarterfinals)
4. (Croatia) Ivan Ljubičić (first round)
5. (United States) James Blake (fourth round)
6. (United States) Andy Roddick (semifinals)
7. (Spain) Tommy Robredo (quarterfinals)
8. (Argentina) David Nalbandian (fourth round)
9. (Croatia) Mario Ančić (fourth round)
10. (Chile) Fernando González (final)
11. (Cyprus) Marcos Baghdatis (second round)
12. (Germany) Tommy Haas (semifinals)
13. (Czech Republic) Tomáš Berdych (fourth round)
14. (Serbia) Novak Djokovic (fourth round)
15. (United Kingdom) Andy Murray (fourth round)
16. (Spain) David Ferrer (fourth round)
17. (Finland) Jarkko Nieminen (second round)
18. (France) Richard Gasquet (fourth round)
19. (Australia) Lleyton Hewitt (third round)
20. (Czech Republic) Radek Štěpánek (third round)
21. (Russia) Dmitry Tursunov (third round)
22. (Slovakia) Dominik Hrbatý (third round)
23. (Sweden) Robin Söderling (first round)
24. (Spain) Juan Carlos Ferrero (second round)
25. (Russia) Mikhail Youzhny (third round)
26. (Russia) Marat Safin (third round)
27. (Argentina) José Acasuso (first round)
28. (France) Sébastien Grosjean (third round)
29. (Belgium) Xavier Malisse (first round)
30. (Argentina) Agustín Calleri (first round)
31. (Switzerland) Stan Wawrinka (third round)
32. (Spain) Nicolás Almagro (first round)

Click on the seed number of a player to go to their draw section.

== Draw ==
Key

- Q = Qualifier
- WC = Wild card
- LL = Lucky loser
- Alt = Alternate
- ITF = ITF entry
- PR = Protected ranking
- SR = Special ranking
- SE = Special exempt
- JE = Junior exempt
- JR = Junior Accelerator Programme entrant
- CO = College Accelerator Programme entrant
- NG = Next Gen Accelerator Program entrant
- w/o = Walkover
- r = Retired
- d = Defaulted

=== Finals ===
Quarterfinals
1 | (Switzerland) Roger Federer | 6 | 7 | 7
7 | (Spain) Tommy Robredo | 3 | 6^{2} | 5
(United States) Mardy Fish | 2 | 2 | 2
6 | (United States) Andy Roddick | 6 | 6 | 6
12 | (Germany) Tommy Haas | 6 | 2 | 1 | 6 | 7
3 | (Russia) Nikolay Davydenko | 3 | 6 | 6 | 1 | 5
10 | (Chile) Fernando González | 6 | 6 | 6
2 | (Spain) Rafael Nadal | 2 | 4 | 3

Semifinals
1 | (Switzerland) Roger Federer | 6 | 6 | 6
6 | (United States) Andy Roddick | 4 | 0 | 2
12 | (Germany) Tommy Haas | 1 | 3 | 1
10 | (Chile) Fernando González | 6 | 6 | 6

Final
1 | (Switzerland) Roger Federer | 7 | 6 | 6
10 | (Chile) Fernando González | 6^{2} | 4 | 4

=== Top half ===
==== Section 1 ====
First round
1 | (Switzerland) R Federer | 7 | 6 | 6
(Germany) B Phau | 5 | 0 | 4
(Sweden) J Björkman | 5 | 4 | 6 | 6 | 6
(France) O Patience | 7 | 6 | 0 | 1 | 2
(Germany) S Greul | 3 | 4 | 3
(Chinese Taipei) Y-h Lu | 6 | 6 | 6
(Czech Republic) J Hernych | 6^{6} | 2 | 0
25 | (Russia) M Youzhny | 7 | 6 | 6
24 | (Spain) JC Ferrero | 3
(Czech Republic) J Hájek | 0 | r
(Thailand) D Udomchoke | 6 | 6 | 6
(Argentina) M Vassallo Argüello | 3 | 3 | 2
(Spain) F López | 7 | 4 | 6 | 7
Q | (United States) B Wilson | 6^{8} | 6 | 3 | 6^{3}
(Chile) N Massú | 1 | 1 | 0
14 | (Serbia) N Djokovic | 6 | 6 | 6

Second round
1 | (Switzerland) R Federer | 6 | 6 | 6
(Sweden) J Björkman | 2 | 3 | 2
(Chinese Taipei) Y-h Lu | 5 | 4 | 4
25 | (Russia) M Youzhny | 7 | 6 | 6
24 | (Spain) JC Ferrero | 6^{0} | 5 | 6 | 1
(Thailand) D Udomchoke | 7 | 7 | 4 | 6
(Spain) F López | 2 | 5 | 1
14 | (Serbia) N Djokovic | 6 | 7 | 6

Third round
1 | (Switzerland) R Federer | 6 | 6 | 7
25 | (Russia) M Youzhny | 3 | 3 | 6^{5}
(Thailand) D Udomchoke | 3 | 4 | 7 | 1
14 | (Serbia) N Djokovic | 6 | 6 | 5 | 6

Fourth round
1 | (Switzerland) R Federer | 6 | 7 | 6
14 | (Serbia) N Djokovic | 2 | 5 | 3

==== Section 2 ====
First round
11 | (Cyprus) M Baghdatis | 6 | 2 | 6 | 6
(Germany) R Schüttler | 4 | 6 | 3 | 2
(France) G Monfils | 7 | 6^{9} | 6 | 7
(Italy) D Bracciali | 6^{2} | 7 | 4 | 6^{5}
(France) G Simon | 3 | 0 | 2
(United States) A Delic | 6 | 6 | 6
(Italy) F Volandri | 4 | 4 | 2
18 | (France) R Gasquet | 6 | 6 | 6
27 | (Argentina) J Acasuso | 7 | 4 | 1 | 3
WC | (United States) S Querrey | 6^{2} | 6 | 6 | 6
(France) F Serra | 7 | 6 | 6
(France) N Devilder | 5 | 2 | 4
(Croatia) I Karlović | 4 | 4 | 6^{6}
(Austria) J Melzer | 6 | 6 | 7
(Spain) R Ramírez Hidalgo | 4 | 4 | 0
7 | (Spain) T Robredo | 6 | 6 | 6

Second round
11 | (Cyprus) M Baghdatis | 6^{5} | 2 | 6 | 0
(France) G Monfils | 7 | 6 | 2 | 6
(United States) A Delic | 1 | 2 | 4
18 | (France) R Gasquet | 6 | 6 | 6
WC | (United States) S Querrey | 6 | 6 | 6
(France) F Serra | 3 | 4 | 3
(Austria) J Melzer | 1 | 3 | 3
7 | (Spain) T Robredo | 6 | 6 | 6

Third round
(France) G Monfils | 0 | 6 | 5 | 3
18 | (France) R Gasquet | 6 | 4 | 7 | 6
WC | (United States) S Querrey | 4 | 7 | 2 | 1
7 | (Spain) T Robredo | 6 | 6^{5} | 6 | 6

Fourth round
18 | (France) R Gasquet | 4 | 2 | 6 | 4
7 | (Spain) T Robredo | 6 | 6 | 3 | 6

==== Section 3 ====
First round
4 | (Croatia) I Ljubičić | 6 | 6^{2} | 4 | 4
(United States) M Fish | 4 | 7 | 6 | 6
(France) N Mahut | 6 | 6^{0} | 6 | 6
(Argentina) J Mónaco | 0 | 7 | 3 | 4
(Austria) S Koubek | 6 | 7 | 6^{5} | 2 | 3
WC | (Australia) W Arthurs | 1 | 6^{4} | 7 | 6 | 6
Q | (United States) Z Fleishman | 7 | 4 | 6 | 6
30 | (Argentina) A Calleri | 5 | 6 | 3 | 4
20 | (Czech Republic) R Štěpánek | 6 | 6 | 6
(France) M Llodra | 2 | 4 | 0
(Czech Republic) L Dlouhý | 6 | 6 | 6^{5} | 6^{5} | 16
Q | (Russia) T Gabashvili | 3 | 1 | 7 | 7 | 14
(Sweden) T Johansson | 6 | 3 | 1 | 6 | 6
Q | (Switzerland) M Chiudinelli | 4 | 6 | 6 | 4 | 2
(Denmark) K Pless | 5 | 4 | 3
16 | (Spain) D Ferrer | 7 | 6 | 6

Second round
(United States) M Fish | 7 | 6 | 3 | 6
(France) N Mahut | 5 | 4 | 6 | 4
WC | (Australia) W Arthurs | 6^{5} | 6 | 6 | 6
Q | (United States) Z Fleishman | 7 | 1 | 4 | 4
20 | (Czech Republic) R Štěpánek | 4 | 4 | 6 | 6 | 6
(Czech Republic) L Dlouhý | 6 | 6 | 4 | 1 | 4
(Sweden) T Johansson | 2 | 7 | 2 | 2
16 | (Spain) D Ferrer | 6 | 6^{5} | 6 | 6

Third round
(United States) M Fish | 3
WC | (Australia) W Arthurs | 0 | r
20 | (Czech Republic) R Štěpánek | 7 | 6 | 0 | 4 | 3
16 | (Spain) D Ferrer | 6^{5} | 4 | 6 | 6 | 6

Fourth round
(United States) M Fish | 6 | 7 | 2 | 7
16 | (Spain) D Ferrer | 1 | 6^{4} | 6 | 5

==== Section 4 ====
First round
9 | (Croatia) M Ančić | 6 | 6 | 6
WC | (Japan) G Soeda | 4 | 3 | 2
PR | (Sweden) J Johansson | 1 | r
(Spain) G García-López | 1
(United States) V Spadea | 6 | 7 | 6
(Russia) I Andreev | 2 | 6^{3} | 1
(Czech Republic) J Vaněk | 7 | 6^{1} | 1 | 3
22 | (Slovakia) D Hrbatý | 6^{7} | 7 | 6 | 6
26 | (Russia) M Safin | 5 | 7 | 3 | 6 | 6
(Germany) B Becker | 7 | 6^{2} | 6 | 3 | 4
Q | (Israel) D Sela | 6 | 6 | 6
(Thailand) P Srichaphan | 4 | 2 | 2
(France) M Gicquel | 3 | 6^{1} | 6 | 6 | 6
WC | (Australia) A Jones | 6 | 7 | 4 | 1 | 0
WC | (France) J-W Tsonga | 7 | 6^{2} | 3 | 3
6 | (United States) A Roddick | 6^{18} | 7 | 6 | 6

Second round
9 | (Croatia) M Ančić | 3 | 7 | 6 | 6
(Spain) G García-López | 6 | 5 | 2 | 2
(United States) V Spadea | 7 | 4 | 4 | 3
22 | (Slovakia) D Hrbatý | 5 | 6 | 6 | 6
26 | (Russia) M Safin | 6 | 5 | 4 | 7 | 6
Q | (Israel) D Sela | 3 | 7 | 6 | 6^{4} | 0
(France) M Gicquel | 3 | 6^{4} | 4
6 | (United States) A Roddick | 6 | 7 | 6

Third round
9 | (Croatia) M Ančić | 6 | 6 | 6
22 | (Slovakia) D Hrbatý | 3 | 2 | 1
26 | (Russia) M Safin | 6^{2} | 6 | 4 | 6^{2}
6 | (United States) A Roddick | 7 | 2 | 6 | 7

Fourth round
9 | (Croatia) M Ančić | 3 | 6 | 1 | 7 | 4
6 | (United States) A Roddick | 6 | 3 | 6 | 5 | 6

=== Bottom half ===
==== Section 5 ====
First round
8 | (Argentina) D Nalbandian | 6^{5} | 4 | 7 | 6 | 2
(Serbia) J Tipsarević | 7 | 6 | 6^{2} | 0 | 1^{r}
Q | (United Kingdom) A Mackin | 4 | 4 | 2
(Ecuador) N Lapentti | 6 | 6 | 6
WC | (Australia) C Guccione | 6 | 5 | 5 | 7 | 7
(Belgium) O Rochus | 3 | 7 | 7 | 6^{4} | 9
(Belgium) C Rochus | 2 | 1 | r
28 | (France) S Grosjean | 6 | 4
23 | (Sweden) R Söderling | 6 | 4 | 6 | 4 | 0
(Germany) F Mayer | 3 | 6 | 3 | 6 | 6
(Italy) A Seppi | 6 | 6^{4} | 6^{5} | 7 | 6
Q | (United States) B Reynolds | 1 | 7 | 7 | 6^{3} | 3
Q | (Croatia) M Čilić | 2 | 4 | 1
Q | (Serbia) I Bozoljac | 6 | 6 | 6
(Spain) A Montañés | 5 | 1 | 6^{3}
12 | (Germany) T Haas | 7 | 6 | 7

Second round
8 | (Argentina) D Nalbandian | 6 | 6 | 6
(Ecuador) N Lapentti | 4 | 4 | 4
(Belgium) O Rochus | 6 | 1 | 3 | 6 | 4
28 | (France) S Grosjean | 4 | 6 | 6 | 4 | 6
(Germany) F Mayer | 5 | 7 | 6 | 6
(Italy) A Seppi | 7 | 5 | 2 | 2
Q | (Serbia) I Bozoljac | 6^{3} | 1 | 3
12 | (Germany) T Haas | 7 | 6 | 6

Third round
8 | (Argentina) D Nalbandian | 5 | 4 | 7 | 6 | 6
28 | (France) S Grosjean | 7 | 6 | 6^{4} | 4 | 1
(Germany) F Mayer | 6^{3} | 3 | 3
12 | (Germany) T Haas | 7 | 6 | 6

Fourth round
8 | (Argentina) D Nalbandian | 6 | 3 | 2 | 3
12 | (Germany) T Haas | 4 | 6 | 6 | 6

==== Section 6 ====
First round
13 | (Czech Republic) T Berdych | 6 | 6 | 6
(South Korea) H-t Lee | 1 | 2 | 2
Q | (Slovakia) L Lacko | 2 | 6 | 1 | 4
WC | (Australia) R Smeets | 6 | 3 | 6 | 6
(Belarus) M Mirnyi | 7 | 3 | 2 | 6 | 6
(Peru) L Horna | 6^{4} | 6 | 6 | 4 | 4
Q | (Germany) A Waske | 7 | 4 | 3 | 4
21 | (Russia) D Tursunov | 5 | 6 | 6 | 6
29 | (Belgium) X Malisse | 3 | 6 | 5 | 4
(France) A Clément | 6 | 3 | 7 | 6
(France) F Santoro | 7 | 6 | 6
(Russia) I Kunitsyn | 6^{5} | 3 | 0
(Luxembourg) G Müller | 6 | 4 | 6 | 6
(Argentina) G Gaudio | 0 | 6 | 2 | 3
(Argentina) S Roitman | 2 | 5 | 2
3 | (Russia) N Davydenko | 6 | 7 | 6

Second round
13 | (Czech Republic) T Berdych | 6 | 6 | 6
(Australia) R Smeets | 3 | 2 | 4
(Belarus) M Mirnyi | 2 | 3 | 6^{4}
21 | (Russia) D Tursunov | 6 | 6 | 7
(France) A Clément | 2 | 4 | 2
(France) F Santoro | 6 | 6 | 6
(Luxembourg) G Müller | 4 | 0 | 3
3 | (Russia) N Davydenko | 6 | 6 | 6

Third round
13 | (Czech Republic) T Berdych | 6 | 6 | 6
21 | (Russia) D Tursunov | 2 | 1 | 1
(France) F Santoro | 6^{1} | 2 | 2
3 | (Russia) N Davydenko | 7 | 6 | 6

Fourth round
13 | (Czech Republic) T Berdych | 7 | 4 | 1 | 6^{5}
3 | (Russia) N Davydenko | 5 | 6 | 6 | 7

==== Section 7 ====
First round
5 | (United States) J Blake | 7 | 6 | 6
(Spain) C Moyá | 6^{8} | 2 | 4
WC | (Australia) P Luczak | 4 | 7 | 7 | 1 | 4
Q | (United States) A Kuznetsov | 6 | 5 | 6^{5} | 6 | 6
Q | (Germany) M Zverev | 6 | 7 | 3 | 6
Q | (Germany) M Berrer | 4 | 6^{1} | 6 | 4
(United States) R Ginepri | 4 | 6 | 4 | 7 | 6
32 | (Spain) N Almagro | 6 | 2 | 6 | 5 | 3
19 | (Australia) L Hewitt | 3 | 2 | 6 | 6 | 6
Q | (United States) M Russell | 6 | 6 | 3 | 3 | 3
(Canada) F Dancevic | 6 | 6 | 7
PR | (Romania) V Hănescu | 3 | 3 | 6^{6}
(Argentina) JM del Potro | 6 | 6 | 6
(Italy) A di Mauro | 3 | 3 | 1
(Russia) E Korolev | 7 | 6^{6} | 3 | 2
10 | (Chile) F González | 6^{4} | 7 | 6 | 6

Second round
5 | (United States) J Blake | 6 | 6 | 6
Q | (United States) A Kuznetsov | 4 | 1 | 2
Q | (Germany) M Zverev | 4 | 5 | 1
(United States) R Ginepri | 6 | 7 | 6
19 | (Australia) L Hewitt | 6 | 6 | 3 | 6
(Canada) F Dancevic | 4 | 4 | 6 | 4
(Argentina) JM del Potro | 6^{7} | 6 | 7 | 4 | 0^{r}
10 | (Chile) F González | 7 | 4 | 6^{3} | 6 | 4

Third round
5 | (United States) J Blake | 7 | 7 | 6
(United States) R Ginepri | 6^{7} | 5 | 2
19 | (Australia) L Hewitt | 2 | 2 | 7 | 4
10 | (Chile) F González | 6 | 6 | 5 | 6

Fourth round
5 | (United States) J Blake | 5 | 4 | 6^{4}
10 | (Chile) F González | 7 | 6 | 7

==== Section 8 ====
First round
15 | (United Kingdom) A Murray | 6 | 6 | 6
(Spain) A Martín | 0 | 0 | 1
(Spain) F Verdasco | 6^{5} | 4 | 6^{1}
(France) P-H Mathieu | 7^{7} | 6 | 6^{3} | r
(Argentina) JI Chela | 7 | 6 | 6
(Italy) P Starace | 6^{5} | 4 | 4
(United States) P Goldstein | 7 | 2 | 6^{4} | 4
17 | (Finland) J Nieminen | 5 | 6 | 7 | 6
31 | (Switzerland) S Wawrinka | 6 | 2 | 6 | 6
(United States) K Kim | 1 | 6 | 4 | 2
(France) J Benneteau | 6 | 7 | 2 | 1 | 2
Q | (Chile) P Capdeville | 4 | 6^{4} | 6 | 6 | 6
(Belgium) K Vliegen | 7 | 3 | 2 | 4
(Germany) P Kohlschreiber | 5 | 6 | 6 | 6
(United States) R Kendrick | 6^{6} | 3 | 2
2 | (Spain) R Nadal | 7 | 6 | 6

Second round
15 | (United Kingdom) A Murray | 7 | 7 | 6
(Spain) F Verdasco | 6^{4} | 5 | 4
(Argentina) JI Chela | 6 | 2 | 6 | 6
17 | (Finland) J Nieminen | 3 | 6 | 4 | 4
31 | (Switzerland) S Wawrinka | 6 | 6 | 6
Q | (Chile) P Capdeville | 4 | 3 | 2
(Germany) P Kohlschreiber | 5 | 3 | 6 | 2
2 | (Spain) R Nadal | 7 | 6 | 4 | 6

Third round
15 | (United Kingdom) A Murray | 6 | 6 | 6
(Argentina) JI Chela | 3 | 2 | 4
31 | (Switzerland) S Wawrinka | 2 | 2 | 2
2 | (Spain) R Nadal | 6 | 6 | 6

Fourth round
15 | (United Kingdom) A Murray | 7 | 4 | 6 | 3 | 1
2 | (Spain) R Nadal | 6^{3} | 6 | 4 | 6 | 6

| Preceded by 2006 US Open – Men's singles | Grand Slam men's singles | Succeeded by 2007 French Open – Men's singles |
