= 2007 Australian Open – Mixed doubles =

Mixed doubles
- 2007 Australian Open

Final
- Champions: (Russia) Elena Likhovtseva (Canada) Daniel Nestor
- Runners-up: (Belarus) Victoria Azarenka (Belarus) Max Mirnyi
- Score: 6–4, 6–4

Details
- Draw: 32
- Seeds: 8

Events
Singles	men	women		boys	girls
Doubles	men	women	mixed	boys	girls
WC Singles	men	women	quad
WC Doubles	men	women	quad
Legends	men	women	mixed
- Australian Open

Elena Likhovtseva and Daniel Nestor won the mixed doubles title at the 2007 Australian Open tennis tournament, defeating Victoria Azarenka and Max Mirnyi in the final 6–4, 6–4.

Martina Hingis and Mahesh Bhupathi were the defending champions, but Hingis did not participate in the mixed doubles tournament. Bhupathi partnered Daniela Hantuchová, but lost in the first round to Jelena Janković and Nenad Zimonjić.

== Seeds ==
1. (United States) Lisa Raymond / (United States) Bob Bryan (quarterfinals)
2. (Australia) Rennae Stubbs / (The Bahamas) Mark Knowles (second round)
3. (Australia) Samantha Stosur / (India) Leander Paes (quarterfinals)
4. (Italy) Francesca Schiavone / (Sweden) Jonas Björkman (semifinals)
5. (China) Yan Zi / (Australia) Todd Perry (second round)
6. (Zimbabwe) Cara Black / (Poland) Marcin Matkowski (first round)
7. (South Africa) Liezel Huber / (Zimbabwe) Kevin Ullyett (semifinals)
8. (United States) Meghann Shaughnessy / (Czech Republic) Martin Damm (first round)

== Draw ==
Key

- Q = Qualifier
- WC = Wild card
- LL = Lucky loser
- Alt = Alternate
- ITF = ITF entry
- PR = Protected ranking
- SR = Special ranking
- SE = Special exempt
- JE = Junior exempt
- JR = Junior Accelerator Programme entrant
- CO = College Accelerator Programme entrant
- NG = Next Gen Accelerator Program entrant
- w/o = Walkover
- r = Retired
- d = Defaulted

=== Finals ===
Quarterfinals
1	(United States) Lisa Raymond (United States) Bob Bryan	2	1
(Belarus) Victoria Azarenka (Belarus) Max Mirnyi	6	6
4	(Italy) Francesca Schiavone (Sweden) Jonas Björkman	7^{7}	6
(China) Sun Tiantian (Austria) Julian Knowle	6^{3}	4
(Russia) Elena Likhovtseva (Canada) Daniel Nestor	7^{7}	6
3	(Australia) Samantha Stosur (India) Leander Paes	6^{4}	1
7	(South Africa) Liezel Huber (Zimbabwe) Kevin Ullyett	6	3	[10]
WC	(Australia) Bryanne Stewart (Australia) Nathan Healey	4	6	[7]

Semifinals
(Belarus) Victoria Azarenka (Belarus) Max Mirnyi	6	6
4	(Italy) Francesca Schiavone (Sweden) Jonas Björkman	2	3
(Russia) Elena Likhovtseva (Canada) Daniel Nestor	6	7
7	(South Africa) Liezel Huber (Zimbabwe) Kevin Ullyett	2	5

Finals
(Belarus) Victoria Azarenka (Belarus) Max Mirnyi	4	4
(Russia) Elena Likhovtseva (Canada) Daniel Nestor	6	6

==== Top half ====
First round
1	(United States) L Raymond (United States) B Bryan	6	6
WC	(Australia) A Molik (Australia) P Hanley	1	4
(Russia) V Zvonareva (Israel) A Ram	6^{1}	4
WC	(Australia) C Dellacqua (Australia) C Guccione	7^{7}	6
(Slovakia) D Hantuchová (India) M Bhupathi	6	6^{4}	[8]
(Serbia) J Janković (Serbia) N Zimonjić	4	7^{7}	[10]
(Belarus) V Azarenka (Belarus) M Mirnyi	6	3	[10]
6	(Zimbabwe) C Black (Poland) M Matkowski	4	6	[8]
4	(Italy) F Schiavone (Sweden) J Björkman	4	6	[10]
(Spain) A Medina Garrigues (Argentina) S Prieto	6	3	[5]
(Slovakia) J Husárová (Czech Republic) P Vízner	1	3
(Russia) Kirilenko (Russia) I Andreev	6	6
(China) T Sun (Austria) J Knowle	6	7^{7}
(Italy) M Santangelo (Poland) M Fyrstenberg	2	6^{5}
(Germany) A-L Grönefeld (Czech Republic) F Čermák	6	6^{6}	[5]
5	(China) Z Yan (Australia) T Perry	3	7^{8}	[10]

Second round
1	(United States) L Raymond (United States) B Bryan	6	6
WC	(Australia) C Dellacqua (Australia) C Guccione	2	2
(Serbia) J Janković (Serbia) N Zimonjić	4	5
(Belarus) V Azarenka (Belarus) M Mirnyi	6	7
4	(Italy) F Schiavone (Sweden) J Björkman	6^{7}	6	[10]
(Russia) M Kirilenko (Russia) I Andreev	7^{9}	2	[6]
(China) T Sun (Austria) J Knowle
5	(China) Z Yan (Australia) T Perry	w	/	o

Quarterfinals
1	(United States) L Raymond (United States) B Bryan	2	1
(Belarus) V Azarenka (Belarus) M Mirnyi	6	6
4	(Italy) F Schiavone (Sweden) J Björkman	7^{7}	6
(China) T Sun (Austria) J Knowle	6^{3}	4

Semifinals
(Belarus) V Azarenka (Belarus) M Mirnyi	6	6
4	(Italy) F Schiavone (Sweden) J Björkman	2	3

==== Bottom half ====
First round
8	(United States) Shaughnessy (Czech Republic) M Damm	4	6	[7]
(Russia) E Likhovtseva (Canada) D Nestor	6	3	[10]
ALT	(Romania) A Ehritt-Vanc (Netherlands) R Wassen	4	4
WC	(Australia) M Adamczak (Australia) S Huss	6	6
(Greece) E Daniilidou (South Africa) C Haggard	6	6
(Italy) T Garbin (Czech Republic) L Friedl	3	1
(Russia) E Bovina (Switzerland) Y Allegro	2	2
3	(Australia) S Stosur (India) L Paes	6	7
7	(South Africa) L Huber (Zimbabwe) K Ullyett	7	6
(United States) C Morariu (United States) M Bryan	5	3
(Argentina) P Suárez (Sweden) S Aspelin	4	4
WC	(Australia) N Pratt (Australia) A Fisher	6	6
WC	(Australia) B Stewart (Australia) N Healey	6^{4}	6	[11]
(Czech Republic) I Benešová (Czech Republic) L Dlouhý	7^{7}	4	[9]
(India) S Mirza (France) F Santoro	6^{0}	6	[7]
2	(Australia) R Stubbs (The Bahamas) M Knowles	7^{7}	1	[10]

Second round
(Russia) E Likhovtseva (Canada) D Nestor	6	6
WC	(Australia) M Adamczak (Australia) S Huss	1	4
(Greece) E Daniilidou (South Africa) C Haggard	3	4
3	(Australia) S Stosur (India) L Paes	6	6
7	(South Africa) L Huber (Zimbabwe) K Ullyett	7	2	[10]
WC	(Australia) N Pratt (Australia) A Fisher	5	6	[7]
WC	(Australia) B Stewart (Australia) N Healey	0	7^{8}	[10]
2	(Australia) R Stubbs (The Bahamas) M Knowles	6	6^{6}	[7]

Quarterfinals
(Russia) E Likhovtseva (Canada) D Nestor	7^{7}	6
3	(Australia) S Stosur (India) L Paes	6^{4}	1
7	(South Africa) L Huber (Zimbabwe) K Ullyett	6	3	[10]
WC	(Australia) B Stewart (Australia) N Healey	4	6	[7]

Semifinals
(Russia) E Likhovtseva (Canada) D Nestor	6	7
7	(South Africa) L Huber (Zimbabwe) K Ullyett	2	5
