= 2007 Australian Open – Wheelchair men's singles =

Wheelchair men's singles
- 2007 Australian Open

Final
- Champion: (Japan) Shingo Kunieda
- Runner-up: (France) Michaël Jérémiasz
- Score: 6–3, 3–6, 6–3

Events
Singles	men	women		boys	girls
Doubles	men	women	mixed	boys	girls
WC Singles	men	women	quad
WC Doubles	men	women	quad
Legends	men	women	mixed
- Australian Open

Shingo Kunieda defeated the defending champion Michaël Jérémiasz in the final, 6–3, 3–6, 6–3 to win the men's singles wheelchair tennis title at the 2007 Australian Open. It was his first major singles title, and the first of an eventual record 28 such titles.

== Seeds ==
All seeds receive a bye into the second round.

1. (Netherlands) Robin Ammerlaan (semifinals)
2. (Japan) Shingo Kunieda (champion)
3. (France) Michaël Jérémiasz (final)
4. (Japan) Satoshi Saida (semifinals)
5. (Poland) Tadeusz Kruszelnicki (quarterfinals)
6. (Netherlands) Ronald Vink (quarterfinals)
7. (Austria) Martin Legner (quarterfinals)
8. (Netherlands) Maikel Scheffers (quarterfinals)

== Draw ==
Key

- Q = Qualifier
- WC = Wild card
- LL = Lucky loser
- Alt = Alternate
- ITF = ITF entry
- PR = Protected ranking
- SR = Special ranking
- SE = Special exempt
- JE = Junior exempt
- JR = Junior Accelerator Programme entrant
- CO = College Accelerator Programme entrant
- NG = Next Gen Accelerator Program entrant
- w/o = Walkover
- r = Retired
- d = Defaulted

=== Finals ===
Semifinals
1	(Netherlands) Robin Ammerlaan	1	6	1
3	(France) Michaël Jérémiasz	6	4	6
4	(Japan) Satoshi Saida	2	4
2	(Japan) Shingo Kunieda	6	6

Final
3	(France) Michaël Jérémiasz	3	6	3
2	(Japan) Shingo Kunieda	6	3	6

=== Top half ===
First round
(France) F Cattaneo	6	6
(United States) L Hinson	0	3
(Australia) M Dobbie	3	3
(Australia) A Bonaccurso	6	6
(Australia) B Weekes	3	1
(France) S Houdet	6	6
(Australia) R Engles	2	3
(Canada) P Rowe	6	6

Second round
1	(Netherlands) R Ammerlaan	6	6
(France) F Cattaneo	1	0
(Australia) A Bonaccurso	2	1
8	(Netherlands) M Scheffers	6	6
3	(France) M Jeremiasz	6	6
(France) S Houdet	1	0
(Canada) P Rowe	0	0
7	(Austria) M Legner	6	6

Quarterfinals
1	(Netherlands) R Ammerlaan	6	6
8	(Netherlands) M Scheffers	2	4
3	(France) M Jeremiasz	6	6
7	(Austria) M Legner	0	2

Semifinals
1	(Netherlands) R Ammerlaan	1	6	1
3	(France) M Jeremiasz	6	4	6

=== Bottom half ===
First round
(Japan) Y Fujimoto	2	3
(Hungary) L Farkas	6	6
(United Kingdom) J Mistry	6	6
(Sweden) N Larsson	0	2
(Australia) D Latham	3	3
(Chile) R Méndez	6	6
(France) F Cazeaudumec	6	6
(Germany) P Krummell	1	1

Second round
6	(Netherlands) R Vink	6	6
(Hungary) L Farkas	1	1
(United Kingdom) J Mistry	1	0
4	(Japan) S Saida	6	6
5	(Poland) T Kruszelnicki	6	6
(Chile) R Méndez	0	4
(France) F Cazeaudumec	1	0
2	(Japan) S Kunieda	6	6

Quarterfinals
6	(Netherlands) R Vink	3	4
4	(Japan) S Saida	6	6
5	(Poland) T Kruszelnicki	1	1
2	(Japan) S Kunieda	6	6

Semifinals
4	(Japan) S Saida	2	4
2	(Japan) S Kunieda	6	6

== Source and link ==
- Draws
