= 2007 Australian Open – Boys' singles =

Boys' singles
- 2007 Australian Open

Final
- Champion: (Australia) Brydan Klein
- Runner-up: (France) Jonathan Eysseric
- Score: 6–2, 4–6, 6–1

Events
Singles	men	women		boys	girls
Doubles	men	women	mixed	boys	girls
WC Singles	men	women	quad
WC Doubles	men	women	quad
Legends	men	women	mixed
- Australian Open

Brydan Klein won this event. He defeated Jonathan Eysseric 6–2, 4–6, 6–1 in the final.

== Seeds ==
1. (Slovakia) Martin Kližan (third round)
2. (France) Jonathan Eysseric (final)
3. (Czech Republic) Roman Jebavý (quarterfinals)
4. (Romania) Petru-Alexandru Luncanu (third round)
5. (Australia) Greg Jones (quarterfinals)
6. (Bolivia) José Roberto Velasco (first round)
7. (Russia) Danila Arsenov (first round)
8. (Italy) Thomas Fabbiano (semifinals)
9. (Italy) Matteo Trevisan (third round)
10. (Lithuania) Ričardas Berankis (semifinals)
11. (Czech Republic) Michal Konečný (third round)
12. (China) Bai Yan (quarterfinals)
13. (Italy) Daniel-Alejandro López (third round)
14. (Madagascar) Lofo Ramiaramanana (second round)
15. (Portugal) Gastão Elias (second round)
16. (Slovakia) Andrej Martin (second round)

== Draw ==
Key

- Q = Qualifier
- WC = Wild card
- LL = Lucky loser
- Alt = Alternate
- ITF = ITF entry
- PR = Protected ranking
- SR = Special ranking
- SE = Special exempt
- JE = Junior exempt
- JR = Junior Accelerator Programme entrant
- CO = College Accelerator Programme entrant
- NG = Next Gen Accelerator Program entrant
- w/o = Walkover
- r = Retired
- d = Defaulted

=== Final eight ===
Quarterfinals
(Australia) Brydan Klein	6	7^{7}
5	(Australia) Greg Jones	3	6^{4}
3	(Czech Republic) Roman Jebavý	3	1
10	(Lithuania) Ričardas Berankis	6	6
8	(Italy) Thomas Fabbiano	6	6
(Australia) John-Patrick Smith	3	4
12	(China) Bai Yan	2	3
2	(France) Jonathan Eysseric	6	6

Semifinals
(Australia) Brydan Klein	6	6
10	(Lithuania) Ričardas Berankis	1	4
8	(Italy) Thomas Fabbiano	4	1
2	(France) Jonathan Eysseric	6	6

Final
(Australia) Brydan Klein	6	4	6
2	(France) Jonathan Eysseric	2	6	1

=== Top half ===
==== Section 1 ====
First round
1	(Slovakia) Martin Kližan	6	6
(Croatia) Goran Rožić	2	3
(Finland) Harri Heliövaara	5
WC	(Australia) James Duckworth	0	r
Q	(Russia) Alexander Smolyakov	3	3
(Australia) Brydan Klein	6	6
(Poland) Mateusz Szmigiel	1	3
14	(Madagascar) Lofo Ramiaramanana	6	6
9	(Italy) Matteo Trevisan	6	6
(United States) Dennis Lajola	1	2
(Australia) Dayne Kelly	3	0
WC	(Thailand) Peerakit Siributwong	6	6
Q	(China) Zhou Zhuoqing	1	7^{8}	4
(Germany) Dimitris Kleftakos	6	6^{6}	6
Q	(Serbia) Ilija Vučić	2	3
5	(Australia) Greg Jones	6	6

Second round
1	(Slovakia) M Kližan	6	7^{7}
(Finland) H Heliövaara	3	6^{4}
(Australia) B Klein	7	6
14	(Madagascar) L Ramiaramanana	5	1
9	(Italy) M Trevisan	6	6
(Thailand) P Siributwong	3	2
(Germany) D Kleftakos	2	2
5	(Australia) G Jones	6	6

Third round
1	(Slovakia) M Kližan	2	7^{7}	1
(Australia) B Klein	6	6^{3}	6
9	(Italy) M Trevisan	4	6	0
5	(Australia) G Jones	6	3	6

Quarterfinals
(Australia) B Klein	6	7^{7}
5	(Australia) G Jones	3	6^{4}

==== Section 2 ====
First round
3	(Czech Republic) Roman Jebavý	2	6	6
(Australia) Stephen Donald	6	3	3
(Russia) Vladimir Zinyakov	0	6	3
(United Kingdom) Daniel Cox	6	4	6
WC	(Australia) Krishananth Balakrishnan	6	2	1
(Japan) Hiroki Moriya	4	6	6
(Switzerland) Dylan Sessagesimi	6	3	2
15	(Portugal) Gastão Elias	3	6	6
10	(Lithuania) Ričardas Berankis	6	6
WC	(Australia) Troy Smith	4	2
(South Korea) Cho Soong-jae	3	4
(United States) Mateusz Kecki	6	6
(France) Kevin Botti	2	6	6
(India) Rupesh Roy	6	3	3
(Australia) Bernard Tomic	6	4
6	(Bolivia) José Roberto Velasco	2	1	r

Second round
3	(Czech Republic) R Jebavý	7^{7}	2	7
(United Kingdom) D Cox	6^{4}	6	5
(Japan) H Moriya	6	6
15	(Portugal) G Elias	4	4
10	(Lithuania) R Berankis	7	6
(United States) M Kecki	5	1
(France) K Botti	6	4	6
(Australia) B Tomic	2	6	3

Third round
3	(Czech Republic) R Jebavý	6	6
(Japan) H Moriya	3	3
10	(Lithuania) R Berankis	7	6
(France) K Botti	5	4

Quarterfinals
3	(Czech Republic) R Jebavý	3	1
10	(Lithuania) R Berankis	6	6

=== Bottom half ===
==== Section 3 ====
First round
8	(Italy) Thomas Fabbiano	6	6
Q	(Australia) James Rigg	3	4
(Bulgaria) Valentin Dimov	6	6
(United States) Johnny Hamui	3	2
(Georgia (country)) Lazare Kukhalashvili	2	7	6
(United Kingdom) Graeme Dyce	6	6	1
(Australia) Andrew Thomas	3	6	3
11	(Czech Republic) Michal Konečný	6	2	6
16	(Slovakia) Andrej Martin	4	6	6
(South Korea) Oh Dae-soung	6	1	2
Q	(United States) Drew Daniel	0	2
(Australia) John-Patrick Smith	6	6
Q	(China) Wu Chen-Yu	4	4
(Australia) Jared Easton	6	6
(New Zealand) Marcus Daniell	1	1
4	(Romania) Petru-Alexandru Luncanu	6	6

Second round
8	(Italy) T Fabbiano	6	6
(Bulgaria) V Dimov	1	4
(Georgia (country)) L Kukhalashvili	1	1
11	(Czech Republic) M Konečný	6	6
16	(Slovakia) A Martin	4	0	r
(Australia) J-P Smith	6	2
(Australia) J Easton	4	4
4	(Romania) P-A Luncanu	6	6

Third round
8	(Italy) T Fabbiano	7	7
11	(Czech Republic) M Konečný	6	6
(Australia) J-P Smith	7	6
4	(Romania) P-A Luncanu	6	4

Quarterfinals
8	(Italy) T Fabbiano	6	6
(Australia) J-P Smith	3	4

==== Section 4 ====
First round
7	(Russia) Danila Arsenov	2	0
WC	(Australia) John Millman	6	6
(United States) Austin Krajicek	1	6
(Indonesia) Christopher Rungkat	6	7
(Slovenia) Aljaž Bedene	4	0
(North Macedonia) Ilija Martinoski	6	6
WC	(Australia) Brendan McKenzie	6	3
12	(China) Bai Yan	7	6
13	(Italy) Daniel-Alejandro López	4	6	6
(South Korea) Lim Yong-kyu	6	2	3
WC	(Australia) Isaac Frost	6	5	1
(Japan) Fumiaki Kita	3	7	6
Q	(Netherlands) Evthimios Karaliolios	5	3
(Australia) Joel Lindner	7	6
(Thailand) Peerakiat Siriluethaiwattana	6	1
2	(France) Jonathan Eysseric	7	6

Second round
(Australia) J Millman	5	6	4
(Indonesia) C Rungkat	7	1	6
(North Macedonia) I Martinoski	4	6
12	(China) Y Bai	6	7
13	(Italy) D-A López	6	6
(Japan) F Kita	2	3
(Australia) J Lindner	3	4
2	(France) J Eysseric	6	6

Third round
(Indonesia) C Rungkat	5	6	1
12	(China) Y Bai	7	4	6
13	(Italy) D-A López	6	6
2	(France) J Eysseric	7	7

Quarterfinals
12	(China) Y Bai	2	3
2	(France) J Eysseric	6	6
