= 2007 Australian Open – Boys' doubles =

Boys' doubles
- 2007 Australian Open

Final
- Champion: (United Kingdom) Graeme Dyce (Finland) Harri Heliövaara
- Runner-up: (Australia) Stephen Donald (India) Rupesh Roy
- Score: 6–2, 6–7^{(4–7)}, 6–3

Events
Singles	men	women		boys	girls
Doubles	men	women	mixed	boys	girls
WC Singles	men	women	quad
WC Doubles	men	women	quad
Legends	men	women	mixed
- Australian Open

Graeme Dyce and Harri Heliövaara won the title by defeating Stephen Donald and Rupesh Roy 6–2, 6–7^{(4–7)}, 6–3 in the final.

== Seeds ==
1. (Czech Republic) Roman Jebavý / (Slovakia) Martin Kližan (quarterfinals)
2. (Italy) Thomas Fabbiano / (Romania) Petru-Alexandru Luncanu (second round)
3. n/a
4. (Italy) Daniel-Alejandro López / (Italy) Matteo Trevisan (first round)
5. (Czech Republic) Michal Konecny / (Slovakia) Andrej Martin (first round)
6. (Lithuania) Ričardas Berankis / (Indonesia) Christopher Rungkat (second round)
7. (United States) Johnny Hamui / (United States) Dennis Lajola (quarterfinals)
8. (Australia) Stephen Donald / (India) Rupesh Roy (final)

== Draw ==
Key

- Q = Qualifier
- WC = Wild card
- LL = Lucky loser
- Alt = Alternate
- ITF = ITF entry
- PR = Protected ranking
- SR = Special ranking
- SE = Special exempt
- JE = Junior exempt
- JR = Junior Accelerator Programme entrant
- CO = College Accelerator Programme entrant
- NG = Next Gen Accelerator Program entrant
- w/o = Walkover
- r = Retired
- d = Defaulted

=== Finals ===
Quarterfinals
1	(Czech Republic) Roman Jebavý (Slovakia) Martin Kližan	6	1	6^{5}
8	(Australia) Stephen Donald (India) Rupesh Roy	4	6	7^{7}
(South Korea) Soong-Jae Cho (South Korea) Yong-Kyu Lim	0	6	7^{7}
7	(United States) Johnny Hamui (United States) Dennis Lajola	6	1	6^{4}
(United Kingdom) Graeme Dyce (Finland) Harri Heliövaara	6	6
(Poland) Andriej Kapaś (Poland) Mateusz Szmigiel	3	1
(United Kingdom) Daniel Cox (Portugal) Gastão Elias	2	2
(United States) Mateusz Kecki (United States) Austin Krajicek	6	6

Semifinals
8	(Australia) Stephen Donald (India) Rupesh Roy	6	6
(South Korea) Soong-Jae Cho (South Korea) Yong-Kyu Lim	3	4
(United Kingdom) Graeme Dyce (Finland) Harri Heliövaara	6	6
(United States) Mateusz Kecki (United States) Austin Krajicek	0	2

Final
8	(Australia) Stephen Donald (India) Rupesh Roy	2	7^{7}	3
(United Kingdom) Graeme Dyce (Finland) Harri Heliövaara	6	6^{4}	6

=== Top half ===
First round
1	(Czech Republic) Roman Jebavý (Slovakia) Martin Kližan	6	3	6
(United States) Drew Daniel (South Africa) Ruan Roelofse	3	6	2
(North Macedonia) Ilija Martinoski (Croatia) Goran Rozic	2	3
(Russia) Danila Arsenov (Russia) Vladimir Zinyakov	6	6
(China) Chen-Yu Wu (China) Zhuo-Qing Zhou	4	4
WC	(Australia) Jared Easton (Australia) Bernard Tomic	6	6
(Bulgaria) Valentin Dimov (Japan) Fumiaki Kita	2	1
8	(Australia) Stephen Donald (India) Rupesh Roy	6	6
4	(Italy) Daniel-Alejandro López (Italy) Matteo Trevisan	3	5
(Australia) Joel Lindner (Australia) John-Patrick Smith	6	7
(South Korea) Soong-Jae Cho (South Korea) Yong-Kyu Lim	6	6
(France) Kevin Botti (France) Nassim Slilam	3	1
(New Zealand) Marcus Daniell (Russia) Alexander Smolyakov	7	3	6
WC	(Australia) Dayne Kelly (Australia) Troy Smith	5	6	3
(Germany) Dimitrios Kleftakos (Australia) Andrew Thomas	7^{10}	2	3
7	(United States) Johnny Hamui (United States) Dennis Lajola	6^{8}	6	6

Second round
1	(Czech Republic) R Jebavý (Slovakia) M Kližan	7^{8}	6
(Russia) D Arsenov (Russia) V Zinyakov	6^{6}	4
WC	(Australia) J Easton (Australia) B Tomic	6	3	4
8	(Australia) S Donald (India) R Roy	2	6	6
(Australia) J Lindner (Australia) J-P Smith	6	3	2
(South Korea) S-J Cho (South Korea) Y-K Lim	3	6	6
(New Zealand) M Daniell (Russia) A Smolyakov	1	3
7	(United States) J Hamui (United States) D Lajola	6	6

Quarterfinals
1	(Czech Republic) R Jebavý (Slovakia) M Kližan	6	1	6^{5}
8	(Australia) S Donald (India) R Roy	4	6	7^{7}
(South Korea) S-J Cho (South Korea) Y-K Lim	0	6	7^{7}
7	(United States) J Hamui (United States) D Lajola	6	1	6^{4}

Semifinals
8	(Australia) S Donald (India) R Roy	6	6
(South Korea) S-J Cho (South Korea) Y-K Lim	3	4

=== Bottom half ===
First round
6	(Lithuania) Ričardas Berankis (Indonesia) Christopher Rungkat	7^{7}	7
(Australia) Greg Jones (Australia) Brydan Klein	6^{3}	5
(France) Jonathan Eysseric (Switzerland) Dylan Sessagesimi	5	2
(United Kingdom) Graeme Dyce (Finland) Harri Heliövaara	7	6
(Poland) Andriej Kapaś (Poland) Mateusz Szmigiel	6	6
(Thailand) Peerakit Siributwong (Thailand) Perakiat Siriluethaiwattana	4	4
WC	(Australia) Isaac Frost (Australia) John Millman	7	6
Alt	(Georgia (country)) Lazare Kukhalashvili (Italy) Stefano Valenti	5	4
5	(Czech Republic) Michal Konecny (Slovakia) Andrej Martin	6	4	4
(United Kingdom) Daniel Cox (Portugal) Gastão Elias	1	6	6
(Japan) Tadayuki Longhi (South Korea) Dae-Soung Oh	6	6
(China) Yan Bai (China) Chuan Jiang	3	4
(United States) Mateusz Kecki (United States) Austin Krajicek	6	6
(Slovenia) Aljaž Bedene (Serbia) Ilija Vucic	2	4
WC	(Australia) Brendan Mckenzie (Australia) James Rigg	3	6^{1}
2	(Italy) Thomas Fabbiano (Romania) Petru-Alexandru Luncanu	6	7^{7}

Second round
6	(Lithuania) R Berankis (Indonesia) C Rungkat	5	3
(United Kingdom) G Dyce (Finland) H Heliövaara	7	6
(Poland) A Kapaś (Poland) M Szmigiel	6	3	6
WC	(Australia) I Frost (Australia) J Millman	4	6	3
(United Kingdom) D Cox (Portugal) G Elias	7	6
(Japan) T Longhi (South Korea) D-S Oh	5	3
(United States) M Kecki (United States) A Krajicek	6	5	6
2	(Italy) T Fabbiano (Romania) P-A Luncanu	1	7	1

Quarterfinals
(United Kingdom) G Dyce (Finland) H Heliövaara	6	6
(Poland) A Kapaś (Poland) M Szmigiel	3	1
(United Kingdom) D Cox (Portugal) G Elias	2	2
(United States) M Kecki (United States) A Krajicek	6	6

Semifinals
(United Kingdom) G Dyce (Finland) H Heliövaara	6	6
(United States) M Kecki (United States) A Krajicek	0	2

== Sources ==
- Main Draw
