= Anna Wishink =

Australian tennis player

- Country (sports): Australia
- Born: 28 March 1989 (age 36) Hobart, Australia
- Height: 1.72 m (5 ft 8 in)
- Turned pro: 2008
- Plays: Right-handed (one-handed backhand)
- Prize money: US$15,621

Singles
- Career record: 26-34
- Career titles: 0
- Highest ranking: 495 (9 February 2009)

Grand Slam singles results
- Australian Open: Q1 (2009)

Doubles
- Career record: 9-24
- Career titles: 0
- Highest ranking: 472 (9 February 2009))
- Last updated on: (11 April 2009).

Anna Wishink (born 28 March 1989 in Hobart, Tasmania) is an Australian professional tennis player. Her highest WTA singles ranking is 495, which she reached on 9 February 2009. Her career high in doubles is 472, which she reached on 9 February 2009.

== ITF Circuit finals ==
=== Singles finals 1 (0–1) ===
Legend
$100,000 tournaments
$75,000 tournaments
$50,000 tournaments
$25,000 tournaments
$10,000 tournaments

Result	No.	Date	Location	Surface	Opponent	Score
Loss	1.	9 March 2008	Hamilton, New Zealand	Hard	(New Zealand) Ellen Barry	7–6^{(1)}, 1–6, 4–6
