= 2007 French Open – Women's singles qualifying =

Women's singles qualifying
- 2007 French Open

Events
Singles	men	women		boys	girls
Doubles	men	women	mixed	boys	girls
WC Singles	men	women	quad
WC Doubles	men	women	quad
Legends	−45	45+	women

Qualification
Singles	men	women
- French Open

This article displays the qualifying draw for the women's singles at the 2007 French Open.

== Seeds ==
1. (Spain) Virginia Ruano Pascual (first round)
2. (Germany) Angelique Kerber (moved to main draw)
3. (Hungary) Ágnes Szávay (qualified)
4. (Russia) Alla Kudryavtseva (qualified)
5. (Germany) Gréta Arn (qualifying competition)
6. (Russia) Galina Voskoboeva (second round)
7. (United States) Bethanie Mattek (first round)
8. (Switzerland) Timea Bacsinszky (qualified)
9. (United States) Ahsha Rolle (second round)
10. (Sweden) Sofia Arvidsson (qualifying competition, lucky loser)
11. (Romania) Raluca Olaru (qualified)
12. (Slovakia) Dominika Cibulková (qualified)
13. (Chinese Taipei) Hsieh Su-wei (qualified)
14. (United States) Abigail Spears (first round)
15. (Czech Republic) Renata Voráčová (qualifying competition)
16. (Czech Republic) Klára Zakopalová (second round)
17. (Czech Republic) Barbora Strýcová (first round)
18. (Ukraine) Olga Savchuk (qualified)
19. (Uzbekistan) Iroda Tulyaganova (first round)
20. (Czech Republic) Sandra Záhlavová (first round)
21. (Czech Republic) Hana Šromová (first round)
22. (Finland) Emma Laine (qualifying competition, lucky loser)
23. (Ukraine) Viktoriya Kutuzova (second round)
24. (Argentina) Jorgelina Cravero (qualifying competition)

== Qualifiers ==
1. (Ukraine) Mariya Koryttseva
2. (Czech Republic) Květa Peschke
3. (Hungary) Ágnes Szávay
4. (Russia) Alla Kudryavtseva
5. (Uzbekistan) Akgul Amanmuradova
6. (Chinese Taipei) Hsieh Su-wei
7. (Paraguay) Rossana de los Ríos
8. (Switzerland) Timea Bacsinszky
9. (Germany) Andrea Petkovic
10. (Ukraine) Olga Savchuk
11. (Romania) Raluca Olaru
12. (Slovakia) Dominika Cibulková

== Lucky losers ==
1. (Sweden) Sofia Arvidsson
2. (Finland) Emma Laine

== Qualifying draw ==
Key

- Q = Qualifier
- WC = Wild card
- LL = Lucky loser
- Alt = Alternate
- ITF = ITF entry
- PR = Protected ranking
- SR = Special ranking
- SE = Special exempt
- JE = Junior exempt
- JR = Junior Accelerator Programme entrant
- CO = College Accelerator Programme entrant
- NG = Next Gen Accelerator Program entrant
- w/o = Walkover
- r = Retired
- d = Defaulted

=== First qualifier ===
First round
1	(Spain) Virginia Ruano Pascual	3	6	2
(Russia) Alina Jidkova	6	2	6
(Tunisia) Selima Sfar	1	6	3
(Spain) María José Martínez Sánchez	6	4	6
PR	(Ukraine) Mariya Koryttseva	6	6
(Japan) Junri Namigata	4	1
(Italy) Nathalie Viérin	4	3
16	(Czech Republic) Klára Zakopalová	6	6

Second round
(Russia) Alina Jidkova	7	6
(Spain) María José Martínez Sánchez	5	1
PR	(Ukraine) Mariya Koryttseva	6	2	6
16	(Czech Republic) Klára Zakopalová	1	6	4

Qualifying competition
(Russia) Alina Jidkova	2	7	4
PR	(Ukraine) Mariya Koryttseva	6	5	6

=== Second qualifier ===
First round
Alt	(Czech Republic) Michaela Paštiková	6	3	6
(United Kingdom) Melanie South	3	6	3
(Czech Republic) Květa Peschke	6	6
(Hungary) Zsófia Gubacsi	2	2
(Estonia) Margit Rüütel	6	6
(New Zealand) Marina Erakovic	4	1
(Republic of Ireland) Kelly Liggan	3	6^{7}
15	(Czech Republic) Renata Voráčová	6	7^{9}

Second round
Alt	(Czech Republic) Michaela Paštiková	6^{2}	2
(Czech Republic) Květa Peschke	7^{7}	6
(Estonia) Margit Rüütel	3	6	1
15	(Czech Republic) Renata Voráčová	6	2	6

Qualifying competition
(Czech Republic) Květa Peschke	6	6
15	(Czech Republic) Renata Voráčová	4	4

=== Third qualifier ===
First round
3	(Hungary) Ágnes Szávay	6	4	6
(Australia) Monique Adamczak	1	6	0
(Georgia (country)) Margalita Chakhnashvili	6	6
(Israel) Yevgenia Savranska	3	4
(Spain) Laura Pous Tió	6	7
(United States) Julie Ditty	1	5
(Russia) Ekaterina Ivanova	6^{3}	2
23	(Ukraine) Viktoriya Kutuzova	7^{7}	6

Second round
3	(Hungary) Ágnes Szávay	6	6
(Georgia (country)) Margalita Chakhnashvili	0	2
(Spain) Laura Pous Tió	6	6
23	(Ukraine) Viktoriya Kutuzova	3	2

Qualifying competition
3	(Hungary) Ágnes Szávay	6	6
(Spain) Laura Pous Tió	2	1

=== Fourth qualifier ===
First round
4	(Russia) Alla Kudryavtseva	7	6
(Argentina) Paola Suárez	5	3
(Germany) Kathrin Wörle	6	6
(Netherlands) Elise Tamaëla	1	4
(South Africa) Natalie Grandin	6	3	3
(United States) Raquel Kops-Jones	4	6	6
WC	(France) Claire Feuerstein	2	0
24	(Argentina) Jorgelina Cravero	6	6

Second round
4	(Russia) Alla Kudryavtseva	7	6
(Germany) Kathrin Wörle	5	3
(United States) Raquel Kops-Jones	5	0
24	(Argentina) Jorgelina Cravero	7	6

Qualifying competition
4	(Russia) Alla Kudryavtseva	6	6
24	(Argentina) Jorgelina Cravero	3	4

=== Fifth qualifier ===
First round
5	(Germany) Gréta Arn	6	6
(Poland) Joanna Sakowicz	2	2
WC	(France) Florence Haring	4	6	6
(United Kingdom) Katie O'Brien	6	3	3
(Argentina) María José Argeri	1	6	3
(Uzbekistan) Akgul Amanmuradova	6	1	6
(Russia) Evgeniya Rodina	6	6
21	(Czech Republic) Hana Šromová	4	4

Second round
5	(Germany) Gréta Arn	6	6
WC	(France) Florence Haring	2	2
(Uzbekistan) Akgul Amanmuradova	4	7^{7}	6
(Russia) Evgeniya Rodina	6	6^{1}	4

Qualifying competition
5	(Germany) Gréta Arn	3	2
(Uzbekistan) Akgul Amanmuradova	6	6

=== Sixth qualifier ===
First round
6	(Russia) Galina Voskoboeva	6	6
(Romania) Mădălina Gojnea	4	1
(Croatia) Ivana Abramovic	1	3
(Estonia) Maret Ani	6	6
(Puerto Rico) Kristina Brandi	3	1
WC	(United States) Madison Brengle	6	6
WC	(France) Stéphanie Vongsouthi	3	4
13	(Chinese Taipei) Hsieh Su-wei	6	6

Second round
6	(Russia) Galina Voskoboeva	6	2	1
(Estonia) Maret Ani	4	6	6
WC	(United States) Madison Brengle	6	2	3
13	(Chinese Taipei) Hsieh Su-wei	3	6	6

Qualifying competition
(Estonia) Maret Ani	6	3	4
13	(Chinese Taipei) Hsieh Su-wei	2	6	6

=== Seventh qualifier ===
First round
7	(United States) Bethanie Mattek	2	4
WC	(France) Violette Huck	6	6
(Russia) Lioudmila Skavronskaia	4	6	6
(Germany) Sabine Klaschka	6	3	2
(Japan) Yurika Sema	5	1
(Czech Republic) Petra Cetkovská	7	6
(Paraguay) Rossana de los Ríos	6	6
14	(United States) Abigail Spears	4	3

Second round
WC	(France) Violette Huck	6	6
(Russia) Lioudmila Skavronskaia	4	3
(Czech Republic) Petra Cetkovská	2	3
(Paraguay) Rossana de los Ríos	6	6

Qualifying competition
WC	(France) Violette Huck	3	1
(Paraguay) Rossana de los Ríos	6	6

=== Eighth qualifier ===
First round
8	(Switzerland) Timea Bacsinszky	6	6
(Poland) Marta Domachowska	3	2
(United Kingdom) Sarah Borwell	1	2
(Canada) Stéphanie Dubois	6	6
(Romania) Anda Perianu	6	6
(Chinese Taipei) Chuang Chia-jung	4	4
(Romania) Monica Niculescu	6	6
17	(Czech Republic) Barbora Strýcová	2	4

Second round
8	(Switzerland) Timea Bacsinszky	6	6
(Canada) Stéphanie Dubois	1	1
(Romania) Anda Perianu	6	7^{7}
(Romania) Monica Niculescu	4	6^{5}

Qualifying competition
8	(Switzerland) Timea Bacsinszky	6	6
(Romania) Anda Perianu	0	4

=== Ninth qualifier ===
First round
9	(United States) Ahsha Rolle	6	6
(Belarus) Iryna Kuryanovich	0	1
(Czech Republic) Andrea Hlaváčková	3	2
(Germany) Andrea Petkovic	6	6
(Canada) Marie-Ève Pelletier	6	6
WC	(France) Irena Pavlovic	2	3
WC	(France) Julie Coin	2	2
22	(Finland) Emma Laine	6	6

Second round
9	(United States) Ahsha Rolle	2	3
(Germany) Andrea Petkovic	6	6
(Canada) Marie-Ève Pelletier	2	4
22	(Finland) Emma Laine	6	6

Qualifying competition
(Germany) Andrea Petkovic	6	6
22	(Finland) Emma Laine	4	2

=== Tenth qualifier ===
First round
10	(Sweden) Sofia Arvidsson	6	6
(Hungary) Kira Nagy	0	4
(Germany) Vanessa Henke	3	4
(France) Virginie Pichet	6	6
(Spain) Conchita Martínez Granados	6	6
WC	(France) Laurene Fayol	2	2
(United Kingdom) Amanda Keen	7^{7}	6^{4}	1
18	(Ukraine) Olga Savchuk	6^{4}	7^{7}	6

Second round
10	(Sweden) Sofia Arvidsson	6	6
(France) Virginie Pichet	4	2
(Spain) Conchita Martínez Granados	3	1
18	(Ukraine) Olga Savchuk	6	6

Qualifying competition
10	(Sweden) Sofia Arvidsson	4	3
18	(Ukraine) Olga Savchuk	6	6

=== Eleventh qualifier ===
First round
11	(Romania) Raluca Olaru	6	6
(Italy) Sara Errani	2	4
(Japan) Erika Takao	2	2
(Russia) Ekaterina Makarova	6	6
(Croatia) Sanja Ančić	1	3
(Ukraine) Tatiana Perebiynis	6	6
(Germany) Angelika Bachmann	6	6
19	(Uzbekistan) Iroda Tulyaganova	2	3

Second round
11	(Romania) Raluca Olaru	6	7
(Russia) Ekaterina Makarova	1	5
(Ukraine) Tatiana Perebiynis	4	6	8
(Germany) Angelika Bachmann	6	3	10

Qualifying competition
11	(Romania) Raluca Olaru	6	2	6
(Germany) Angelika Bachmann	3	6	4

=== Twelfth qualifier ===
First round
12	(Slovakia) Dominika Cibulková	2	7	6
(Croatia) Ivana Lisjak	6	5	0
(Brazil) Jenifer Widjaja	4	5
(Slovenia) Andreja Klepač	6	7
(United Kingdom) Anne Keothavong	7	6
(Japan) Ayumi Morita	5	4
(China) Yuan Meng	6	6
20	(Czech Republic) Sandra Záhlavová	1	0

Second round
12	(Slovakia) Dominika Cibulková	6	3	6
(Slovenia) Andreja Klepač	1	6	4
(United Kingdom) Anne Keothavong	3	2
(China) Yuan Meng	6	6

Qualifying competition
12	(Slovakia) Dominika Cibulková	7	6
(China) Yuan Meng	5	2
