= 2007 French Open – Men's singles qualifying =

Men's singles qualifying
- 2007 French Open

Events
Singles	men	women		boys	girls
Doubles	men	women	mixed	boys	girls
WC Singles	men	women	quad
WC Doubles	men	women	quad
Legends	−45	45+	women

Qualification
Singles	men	women
- French Open

This article displays the qualifying draw for men's singles at the 2007 French Open.

== Seeds ==
1. (Argentina) Mariano Zabaleta (qualifying competition, lucky loser)
2. (Romania) Andrei Pavel (second round)
3. (Czech Republic) Lukáš Dlouhý (qualified)
4. (Italy) Davide Sanguinetti (first round)
5. (Spain) Iván Navarro (qualified)
6. (Germany) Michael Berrer (second round)
7. (Argentina) Juan Pablo Guzmán (qualifying competition, lucky loser)
8. (Canada) Frank Dancevic (first round)
9. (United Kingdom) Alex Bogdanovic (second round)
10. (Croatia) Marin Čilić (qualified)
11. (Italy) Federico Luzzi (second round)
12. (Chile) Paul Capdeville (qualified)
13. (South Africa) Wesley Moodie (first round)
14. (Serbia) Ilija Bozoljac (first round)
15. (United States) Kevin Kim (first round)
16. (Austria) Oliver Marach (second round)
17. (Colombia) Santiago Giraldo (qualifying competition, lucky loser)
18. (Chile) Adrián García (first round)
19. (Czech Republic) Jiří Vaněk (first round)
20. (Brazil) Flávio Saretta (first round)
21. (Netherlands) Raemon Sluiter (second round)
22. (Netherlands) Robin Haase (second round)
23. (Spain) Fernando Vicente (qualifying competition, lucky loser)
24. (Argentina) Juan Pablo Brzezicki (qualified)
25. (Belgium) Dick Norman (first round)
26. (Czech Republic) Tomáš Zíb (qualifying competition)
27. (South Africa) Rik de Voest (first round)
28. (Spain) Gorka Fraile (qualifying competition)
29. (Germany) Mischa Zverev (first round)
30. (Greece) Konstantinos Economidis (qualified)
31. (Croatia) Roko Karanušić (first round)
32. (Luxembourg) Gilles Müller (first round)

== Qualifiers ==
1. (Brazil) Marcos Daniel
2. (Greece) Konstantinos Economidis
3. (Czech Republic) Lukáš Dlouhý
4. (Italy) Flavio Cipolla
5. (Spain) Iván Navarro
6. (Italy) Fabio Fognini
7. (France) Laurent Recouderc
8. (Argentina) Juan Pablo Brzezicki
9. (Serbia) Boris Pašanski
10. (Croatia) Marin Čilić
11. (France) Jérôme Haehnel
12. (Chile) Paul Capdeville
13. (Belgium) Christophe Rochus
14. (Czech Republic) Ivo Minář
15. (Czech Republic) Bohdan Ulihrach
16. (Serbia) Dušan Vemić

== Lucky losers ==
1. (Argentina) Mariano Zabaleta
2. (Argentina) Juan Pablo Guzmán
3. (Colombia) Santiago Giraldo
4. (Spain) Fernando Vicente

== Qualifying draw ==
Key

- Q = Qualifier
- WC = Wild card
- LL = Lucky loser
- Alt = Alternate
- ITF = ITF entry
- PR = Protected ranking
- SR = Special ranking
- SE = Special exempt
- JE = Junior exempt
- JR = Junior Accelerator Programme entrant
- CO = College Accelerator Programme entrant
- NG = Next Gen Accelerator Program entrant
- w/o = Walkover
- r = Retired
- d = Defaulted

=== First qualifier ===
First round
1	(Argentina) Mariano Zabaleta	6	6
WC	(France) Augustin Gensse	3	4
(United States) Wayne Odesnik	6	6
(France) David Guez	2	4
(Brazil) Marcos Daniel	6	7^{7}
(Brazil) Rogério Dutra Silva	4	6^{5}
(Argentina) Diego Junqueira	4	6	6
19	(Czech Republic) Jiří Vaněk	6	3	4

Second round
1	(Argentina) Mariano Zabaleta	7^{8}	5	6
(United States) Wayne Odesnik	6^{6}	7	3
(Brazil) Marcos Daniel	6	7^{8}
(Argentina) Diego Junqueira	2	6^{6}

Qualifying competition
1	(Argentina) Mariano Zabaleta	3	6	4
(Brazil) Marcos Daniel	6	3	6

=== Second qualifier ===
First round
2	(Romania) Andrei Pavel	6	6
(Austria) Daniel Köllerer	2	4
(Spain) Marc López	6	6
(Brazil) Franco Ferreiro	1	4
(Uzbekistan) Farrukh Dustov	1	1
(Italy) Simone Vagnozzi	6	6
(Germany) Bastian Knittel	1	2
30	(Greece) Konstantinos Economidis	6	6

Second round
2	(Romania) Andrei Pavel	4	5
(Spain) Marc López	6	7
(Italy) Simone Vagnozzi	6	2	3
30	(Greece) Konstantinos Economidis	4	6	6

Qualifying competition
(Spain) Marc López	4	6	3
30	(Greece) Konstantinos Economidis	6	4	6

=== Third qualifier ===
First round
3	(Czech Republic) Lukáš Dlouhý	3	6	6
(United States) Jesse Witten	6	3	4
(Canada) Frédéric Niemeyer	6	6
(France) Gary Lugassy	1	4
(Spain) Santiago Ventura	3	6	8
(Slovakia) Michal Mertiňák	6	2	10
(Germany) Tobias Clemens	4	3
23	(Spain) Fernando Vicente	6	6

Second round
3	(Czech Republic) Lukáš Dlouhý	3	6	6
(Canada) Frédéric Niemeyer	6	1	4
(Slovakia) Michal Mertiňák	5	7^{7}	5
23	(Spain) Fernando Vicente	7	6^{3}	7

Qualifying competition
3	(Czech Republic) Lukáš Dlouhý	0	7	6
23	(Spain) Fernando Vicente	6	5	2

=== Fourth qualifier ===
First round
4	(Italy) Davide Sanguinetti	2	5
(Italy) Flavio Cipolla	6	7
(Spain) Marcel Granollers	6	6
(Argentina) Horacio Zeballos	3	4
(Australia) Wayne Arthurs	6	3	2
Alt	(Ukraine) Oleksandr Dolgopolov Jr.	3	6	6
WC	(Monaco) Benjamin Balleret	6	6
27	(South Africa) Rik de Voest	4	3

Second round
(Italy) Flavio Cipolla	2	7	6
(Spain) Marcel Granollers	6	5	4
Alt	(Ukraine) Oleksandr Dolgopolov Jr.	7^{7}	5	1
WC	(Monaco) Benjamin Balleret	6^{5}	7	6

Qualifying competition
(Italy) Flavio Cipolla	4	6	7
WC	(Monaco) Benjamin Balleret	6	1	5

=== Fifth qualifier ===
First round
5	(Spain) Iván Navarro	3	6	6
(United Kingdom) Josh Goodall	6	2	2
(Israel) Harel Levy	7^{8}	6
(Slovakia) Lukáš Lacko	6^{6}	2
(Switzerland) George Bastl	6	2	1
(Slovakia) Ivo Klec	4	6	6
(Spain) Pablo Andújar	2	6	6
29	(Germany) Mischa Zverev	6	3	2

Second round
5	(Spain) Iván Navarro	6	6
(Israel) Harel Levy	3	4
(Slovakia) Ivo Klec	4	2
(Spain) Pablo Andújar	6	6

Qualifying competition
5	(Spain) Iván Navarro	5	6	8
(Spain) Pablo Andújar	7	4	6

=== Sixth qualifier ===
First round
6	(Germany) Michael Berrer	6	6
(Mexico) Bruno Echagaray	2	0
(Italy) Fabio Fognini	6	6
(Poland) Łukasz Kubot	3	4
(Australia) Alun Jones	5	4
(Germany) Benedikt Dorsch	7	6
(Germany) Rainer Schüttler	7	7
31	(Croatia) Roko Karanušić	5	5

Second round
6	(Germany) Michael Berrer	2	4
(Italy) Fabio Fognini	6	6
(Germany) Benedikt Dorsch	7^{7}	4	3
(Germany) Rainer Schüttler	6^{3}	6	6

Qualifying competition
(Italy) Fabio Fognini	6^{2}	6	6
(Germany) Rainer Schüttler	7^{7}	1	1

=== Seventh qualifier ===
First round
7	(Argentina) Juan Pablo Guzmán	6	6
(Denmark) Kenneth Carlsen	1	4
(Germany) Simon Stadler	6	6
(Poland) Michał Przysiężny	4	4
WC	(France) Laurent Recouderc	6	6
(Czech Republic) Jan Mertl	3	4
(Brazil) Ricardo Mello	7^{7}	3	4
21	(Netherlands) Raemon Sluiter	6^{5}	6	6

Second round
7	(Argentina) Juan Pablo Guzmán	6	6
(Germany) Simon Stadler	3	2
WC	(France) Laurent Recouderc	7^{7}	6
21	(Netherlands) Raemon Sluiter	6^{3}	3

Qualifying competition
7	(Argentina) Juan Pablo Guzmán	4	6	7
WC	(France) Laurent Recouderc	6	4	9

=== Eighth qualifier ===
First round
8	(Canada) Frank Dancevic	6^{5}	4
(Italy) Paolo Lorenzi	7^{7}	6
(Czech Republic) Robin Vik	6	3	6
(Romania) Victor Crivoi	1	6	4
WC	(Slovakia) Martin Kližan	7^{7}	6
(Israel) Noam Okun	6^{1}	0
WC	(France) Jérémy Chardy	7	6^{8}	3
24	(Argentina) Juan Pablo Brzezicki	5	7^{10}	6

Second round
(Italy) Paolo Lorenzi	2	6	6
(Czech Republic) Robin Vik	6	3	4
WC	(Slovakia) Martin Kližan	2	7	2
24	(Argentina) Juan Pablo Brzezicki	6	5	6

Qualifying competition
(Italy) Paolo Lorenzi	2	0
24	(Argentina) Juan Pablo Brzezicki	6	6

=== Ninth qualifier ===
First round
9	(United Kingdom) Alex Bogdanovic	7	6
(Russia) Yuri Schukin	5	1
(Australia) Nathan Healey	4	2
(Portugal) Frederico Gil	6	6
PR	(Romania) Adrian Voinea	4	2
(Serbia) Boris Pašanski	6	6
(France) Nicolas Tourte	7^{8}	2	2
22	(Netherlands) Robin Haase	6^{6}	6	6

Second round
9	(United Kingdom) Alex Bogdanovic	3	0
(Portugal) Frederico Gil	6	6
(Serbia) Boris Pašanski	6	3	11
22	(Netherlands) Robin Haase	4	6	9

Qualifying competition
(Portugal) Frederico Gil	4	6	3
(Serbia) Boris Pašanski	6	3	6

=== Tenth qualifier ===
First round
10	(Croatia) Marin Čilić	6	6
WC	(France) Adrian Mannarino	2	3
(Argentina) Máximo González	6	6
PR	(Spain) Álex Calatrava	2	1
(Argentina) Leonardo Mayer	3	6^{4}
(Morocco) Younes El Aynaoui	6	7^{7}
(Ukraine) Sergiy Stakhovsky	6	7^{10}
20	(Brazil) Flávio Saretta	1	6^{8}

Second round
10	(Croatia) Marin Čilić	6^{2}	6	6
(Argentina) Máximo González	7^{7}	3	3
(Morocco) Younes El Aynaoui	4	6	4
(Ukraine) Sergiy Stakhovsky	6	4	6

Qualifying competition
10	(Croatia) Marin Čilić	6	6
(Ukraine) Sergiy Stakhovsky	2	0

=== Eleventh qualifier ===
First round
11	(Italy) Federico Luzzi	6	4	6
(United States) Hugo Armando	2	6	3
(Spain) Albert Portas	2	6	3
(France) Jérôme Haehnel	6	3	6
(Paraguay) Ramón Delgado	6	7
(United Kingdom) Richard Bloomfield	2	5
(Israel) Dudi Sela	3	4
28	(Spain) Gorka Fraile	6	6

Second round
11	(Italy) Federico Luzzi	4	4
(France) Jérôme Haehnel	6	6
(Paraguay) Ramón Delgado	6	4	1
28	(Spain) Gorka Fraile	3	6	6

Qualifying competition
(France) Jérôme Haehnel	6	6
28	(Spain) Gorka Fraile	4	2

=== Twelfth qualifier ===
First round
12	(Chile) Paul Capdeville	1	6	6
PR	(Romania) Răzvan Sabău	6	0	4
(United States) Alex Kuznetsov	4	7^{7}	7
WC	(France) Josselin Ouanna	6	6^{3}	5
(Algeria) Lamine Ouahab	4	6	1
(Serbia) Viktor Troicki	6	4	6
(Brazil) Júlio Silva	6	6
18	(Chile) Adrián García	3	4

Second round
12	(Chile) Paul Capdeville	6	6^{5}	6
(United States) Alex Kuznetsov	1	7^{7}	3
(Serbia) Viktor Troicki	6	3	5
(Brazil) Júlio Silva	4	6	7

Qualifying competition
12	(Chile) Paul Capdeville	4	6	6
(Brazil) Júlio Silva	6	4	3

=== Thirteenth qualifier ===
First round
13	(South Africa) Wesley Moodie	6^{2}	2
(Belgium) Christophe Rochus	7^{7}	6
(Germany) Denis Gremelmayr	3	6	2
(Romania) Adrian Ungur	6	1	6
WC	(France) Thomas Oger	4	6	7
(Italy) Marco Crugnola	6	3	5
PR	(Switzerland) Michel Kratochvil	2	6	2
26	(Czech Republic) Tomáš Zíb	6	1	6

Second round
(Belgium) Christophe Rochus	6	6
(Romania) Adrian Ungur	2	1
WC	(France) Thomas Oger	6	4	3
26	(Czech Republic) Tomáš Zíb	4	6	6

Qualifying competition
(Belgium) Christophe Rochus	2	6	8
26	(Czech Republic) Tomáš Zíb	6	4	6

=== Fourteenth qualifier ===
First round
14	(Serbia) Ilija Bozoljac	3	4
(Germany) Dieter Kindlmann	6	6
(Czech Republic) Ivo Minář	1	6	6
(United States) Zack Fleishman	6	3	3
(United States) Rajeev Ram	6	7^{7}
(Romania) Victor Ioniță	3	6^{2}
(Argentina) Brian Dabul	6	6
25	(Belgium) Dick Norman	4	4

Second round
(Germany) Dieter Kindlmann	3	3
(Czech Republic) Ivo Minář	6	6
(United States) Rajeev Ram	1	6^{2}
(Argentina) Brian Dabul	6	7^{7}

Qualifying competition
(Czech Republic) Ivo Minář	6	3	6
(Argentina) Brian Dabul	4	6	4

=== Fifteenth qualifier ===
First round
15	(United States) Kevin Kim	6^{0}	1
(Czech Republic) Bohdan Ulihrach	7^{7}	6
(Switzerland) Michael Lammer	6^{5}	6	6
(Czech Republic) Pavel Šnobel	7^{7}	0	1
(Romania) Teodor-Dacian Crăciun	6	6
(Netherlands) Dennis van Scheppingen	0	3
(Germany) Matthias Bachinger	3	6^{5}
17	(Colombia) Santiago Giraldo	6	7^{7}

Second round
(Czech Republic) Bohdan Ulihrach	6	6
(Switzerland) Michael Lammer	4	3
(Romania) Teodor-Dacian Crăciun	3	2
17	(Colombia) Santiago Giraldo	6	6

Qualifying competition
(Czech Republic) Bohdan Ulihrach	6	6
17	(Colombia) Santiago Giraldo	3	3

=== Sixteenth qualifier ===
First round
16	(Austria) Oliver Marach	6	6
(United Kingdom) Jonathan Marray	1	2
(Brazil) André Ghem	4	6^{4}
(Serbia) Dušan Vemić	6	7^{7}
(Uruguay) Pablo Cuevas	6	6
(France) Julien Jeanpierre	2	4
WC	(France) Jean-Christophe Faurel	7^{7}	6
32	(Luxembourg) Gilles Müller	6^{4}	3

Second round
16	(Austria) Oliver Marach	6^{5}	4
(Serbia) Dušan Vemić	7^{7}	6
(Uruguay) Pablo Cuevas	7^{11}	5	6
WC	(France) Jean-Christophe Faurel	6^{9}	7	2

Qualifying competition
(Serbia) Dušan Vemić	6	6
(Uruguay) Pablo Cuevas	3	4
