= Klaudia Boczová =

Slovak tennis player

- Country (sports): Slovakia
- Residence: Bratislava, Slovakia
- Born: 22 December 1990 (age 34); Bratislava, Czechoslovakia
- Turned pro: 2006
- Retired: 2014
- Plays: Right-handed
- Prize money: US$ 33,011

Singles
- Career record: 99–52
- Career titles: 4 ITF
- Highest ranking: No. 261 (25 May 2009)

Grand Slam singles results
- Australian Open Junior: 1R (2007)
- French Open Junior: 2R (2007)
- US Open Junior: 1R (2007)

Doubles
- Career record: 33–15
- Career titles: 5 ITF
- Highest ranking: No. 363 (18 May 2009)

Grand Slam doubles results
- Australian Open Junior: SF (2007)
- French Open Junior: OF (2007)
- US Open Junior: OF (2007)
Medal record
Women's tennis
Representing Slovakia
European Youth Olympic Festival
Bronze medal – third place	2005 Lignano Sabbiadoro	Women's singles
Bronze medal – third place	2005 Lignano Sabbiadoro	Mixed doubles

Klaudia Boczová (born 22 December 1990) is a former Slovak tennis player.

In her career, she won four singles titles and five doubles titles on the ITF Circuit. In May 2009, she reached her best singles ranking of world No. 261. On 18 May 2009, she peaked at No. 363 in the doubles rankings.

Born in Bratislava, Boczová played collegiate tennis in the United States for San Jose State University during 2012–2013.

== Junior years ==
In 2005, she played for Slovakia the European Youth Summer Olympic Festival in Lignano Sabbiadoro (Italy) where she won the bronze medal in women's singles and mixed doubles.

In 2007, she reached the Australian Open semifinals with fellow Slovak Kristína Kučová, losing to the eventual champions and third seeds, Evgeniya Rodina and Arina Rodionova. She also made the French Open and US Open quarterfinals with Kučová, losing to the eventual champions and third seeds, Ksenia Milevskaya and Urszula Radwańska.

Boczová won the 48th Trofeo Bonfiglio in the doubles event, again partnering Kučová.

== ITF Junior Circuit finals ==
Category GA
Category G1
Category G2
Category G3
Category G4

=== Singles: 6 (2 titles, 4 runner–ups) ===
Result	W–L	Date	Tournament	Tier	Surface	Opponent	Score
Loss	0–1	Aug 2004	ITF Bratislava, Slovakia	G4	Clay	(Slovakia) Lenka Wienerová	5–7, 3–6
Loss	0–2	Aug 2004	ITF Miskolc, Hungary	G3	Clay	(Slovakia) Lenka Broošová	6–1, 5–7, 1–6
Loss	0–3	Sep 2006	ITF Prague, Czech Republic	G2	Clay	(Czech Republic) Petra Kvitová	1–6, 4–6
Loss	0–4	May 2007	ITF Salsomaggiore Terme, Italy	G2	Clay	(Slovenia) Polona Hercog	3–6, 2–6
Win	1–4	Apr 2008	ITF Cap-d'Ail, France	G2	Clay	(France) Kristina Mladenovic	7–5, 6–1
Win	2–4	Apr 2008	ITF Istres, France	G2	Clay	(Georgia (country)) Ekaterine Gorgodze	6–4, 6–1

=== Doubles: 20 (11 titles, 9 runner–ups) ===
Result	W–L	Date	Tournament	Tier	Surface	Partner	Opponents	Score
Loss	0–1	Sep 2004	ITF Novi Sad, Serbia	G2	Clay	(Russia) Anastasia Pivovarova	(Belarus) Tatsiana Kapshai (Russia) Anastasia Poltoratskaya	w/o
Loss	0–2	Apr 2005	ITF Piešťany, Slovakia	G2	Clay	(Slovakia) Nikola Vajdová	(Slovakia) Jana Juricová (Slovakia) Magdaléna Rybáriková	3–6, 2–6
Loss	0–3	May 2005	ITF Villach, Austria	G2	Clay	(Slovakia) Michaela Pochabová	(Sweden) Johanna Larsson (Sweden) Nadja Roma	3–6, 0–6
Loss	0–4	Jun 2005	ITF Budapest, Hungary	G2	Clay	(Slovakia) Nikola Vajdová	(Slovakia) Michaela Pochabová (Slovakia) Patrícia Verešová	2–6, 3–6
Loss	0–5	Aug 2005	ITF Miskolc, Hungary	G3	Clay	(Slovakia) Monika Kochanová	(Slovakia) Michaela Pochabová (Slovakia) Patrícia Verešová	6–4, 5–7, 1–6
Loss	0–6	Sep 2005	ITF Novi Sad, Serbia	G2	Clay	(Slovakia) Monika Kochanová	(Slovakia) Michaela Pochabová (Slovakia) Patrícia Verešová	5–7, 1–6
Win	1–6	Jan 2006	ITF Caracas, Venezuela	G1	Hard	(Slovakia) Kristína Kučová	(Brazil) Fernanda Hermenegildo (Brazil) Teliana Pereira	3–6, 6–2, 6–3
Win	2–6	Jan 2006	ITF Barranquilla, Colombia	G1	Clay	(Slovakia) Kristína Kučová	(Austria) Melanie Klaffner (Belgium) Yanina Wickmayer	6–2, 6–0
Win	3–6	Mar 2006	Banana Bowl, Brazil	GA	Clay	(Slovakia) Kristína Kučová	(Brazil) Teliana Pereira (Czech Republic) Kateřina Vaňková	6–3, 6–3
Win	4–6	Apr 2006	ITF Piešťany, Slovakia	G2	Clay	(Slovakia) Kristína Kučová	(Russia) Natalia Orlova (Serbia) Nataša Zorić	6–3, 6–2
Win	5–6	Jun 2006	ITF Offenbach, Germany	G1	Clay	(Mexico) Valeria Pulido	(Belarus) Ksenia Milevskaya (Brazil) Roxane Vaisemberg	6–3, 4–6, 6–4
Loss	5–7	Jul 2006	ITF Wels, Austria	G1	Clay	(Slovakia) Patrícia Verešová	(Czech Republic) Andrea Berková (Czech Republic) Kateřina Kramperová	2–6, 4–6
Win	6–7	Sep 2006	ITF Prague, Czech Republic	G2	Clay	(Slovakia) Monika Širilová	(Czech Republic) Dominika Kaňáková (Czech Republic) Petra Kvitová	6–4, 6–2
Win	7–7	Sep 2006	ITF Novi Sad, Serbia	G2	Clay	(Russia) Anastasia Pivovarova	(Ukraine) Lyudmyla Kichenok (Ukraine) Nadiia Kichenok	6–3, 6–1
Loss	7–8	Jan 2007	ITF Melbourne, Australia	G1	Hard	(Slovakia) Kristína Kučová	(Russia) Anastasia Pavlyuchenkova (Australia) Arina Rodionova	2–6, 3–6
Loss	7–9	Jan 2007	ITF Traralgon, Australia	G1	Hard	(Slovakia) Kristína Kučová	(Italy) Andreea Roxana Vaideanu (Italy) Erika Zanchetta	w/o
Win	8–9	Apr 2007	ITF Umag, Croatia	G1	Clay	(Slovakia) Kristína Kučová	(Romania) Irina-Camelia Begu (Romania) Maria-Luiza Crăciun	6–4, 6–1
Win	9–9	May 2007	ITF Salsomaggiore Terme, Italy	G2	Clay	(Russia) Elena Chernyakova	(Italy) Gioia Barbieri (Italy) Martina Di Giuseppe	6–1, 6–2
Win	10–9	May 2007	Trofeo Bonfiglio, Italy	GA	Clay	(Slovakia) Kristína Kučová	(Czech Republic) Andrea Berková (Slovakia) Lenka Juríková	7–5, 6–3
Win	11–9	Apr 2008	ITF Istres, France	G2	Clay	(France) Cindy Chala	(France) Irina Ramialison (Russia) Polina Rodionova	6–2, 6–0

== ITF finals ==
=== Singles: 7 (4 titles, 3 runner–ups) ===
Legend
$100,000 tournaments
$80,000 tournaments
$50,000 tournaments
$25,000 tournaments
$10,000 tournaments

Result	W–L	Date	Tournament	Tier	Surface	Opponent	Score
Loss	0–1	Jul 2007	ITF Prokuplje, Serbia	10,000	Clay	(Montenegro) Ana Veselinović	4–6, 3–6
Win	1–1	May 2008	ITF Michalovce, Slovakia	10,000	Clay	(Slovakia) Romana Tabak	6–2, 6–3
Win	2–1	Jun 2008	ITF Lenzerheide, Switzerland	10,000	Clay	(Netherlands) Michelle Gerards	6–3, 6–1
Win	3–1	Jun 2008	ITF Båstad, Sweden	25,000	Clay	(Germany) Anne Schäfer	1–6, 6–2, 6–2
Loss	3–2	Sep 2008	ITF Sarajevo, Bosnia and Herzegovina	25,000	Clay	(Slovenia) Maša Zec Peškirič	1–6, 3–6
Win	4–2	Oct 2010	ITF Dubrovnik, Croatia	10,000	Clay	(Serbia) Nataša Zorić	6–3, 7–5
Loss	4–3	Nov 2011	ITF Monastir, Tunisia	10,000	Hard	(Bulgaria) Viktoriya Tomova	1–3 ret.

=== Doubles: 7 (5 titles, 2 runner–ups) ===
Result	W–L	Date	Tournament	Tier	Surface	Partner	Opponents	Score
Win	1–0	May 2007	ITF Michalovce, Slovakia	10,000	Clay	(Slovakia) Kristína Kučová	(Poland) Olga Brózda (Poland) Justyna Jegiołka	7–5, 4–6, 6–3
Loss	1–1	Jul 2007	ITF Prokuplje, Serbia	10,000	Clay	(Finland) Katariina Tuohimaa	(Serbia) Neda Kozić (Serbia) Nataša Zorić	4–6, 5–7
Win	2–1	May 2008	ITF Bucharest, Romania	10,000	Clay	(Slovakia) Romana Tabak	(Romania) Ioana Ivan (Brazil) Vivian Segnini	6–2, 6–0
Win	3–1	Jul 2008	ITF Båstad, Sweden	25,000	Clay	(Netherlands) Nicole Thyssen	(Germany) Anne Schäfer (Hong Kong) Zhang Ling	6–2, 6–1
Win	4–1	Sep 2008	ITF Lecce, Italy	25,000	Clay	(Slovakia) Michaela Pochabová	(Italy) Stefania Chieppa (Italy) Giulia Gabba	6–4, 6–1
Loss	4–2	May 2009	ITF Florence, Italy	25,000	Clay	(Italy) Nicole Clerico	(France) Kinnie Laisné (France) Stephanie Vongsouthi	0–6, 1–6
Win	5–2	Aug 2014	ITF Copenhagen, Denmark	10,000	Clay	(Denmark) Karen Barritza	(Denmark) Emilie Francati (Denmark) Maria Jespersen	6–4, 6–1
