= 2007 French Open – Girls' singles =

Girls' singles
- 2007 French Open

Final
- Champion: (France) Alizé Cornet
- Runner-up: (Colombia) Mariana Duque Marino
- Score: 4–6, 6–1, 6–0

Events
Singles	men	women		boys	girls
Doubles	men	women	mixed	boys	girls
WC Singles	men	women	quad
WC Doubles	men	women	quad
Legends	−45	45+	women
- French Open

France's Alizé Cornet won the title, defeating Mariana Duque Marino in the final, 4-6, 6–1, 6–0.

Agnieszka Radwańska was the defending champion, but chose to compete in the women's singles competition where she lost to 28th seed Mara Santangelo in the first round.

== Seeds ==
1. (Russia) Anastasia Pavlyuchenkova (semifinals)
2. (France) Alizé Cornet (champion)
3. (Russia) Anastasia Pivovarova (second round)
4. (Romania) Sorana Cîrstea (third round)
5. (Russia) Evgeniya Rodina (quarterfinals)
6. (Belarus) Ksenia Milevskaya (semifinals)
7. (United States) Julia Cohen (first round)
8. (Austria) Nikola Hofmanova (quarterfinals)
9. (United States) Madison Brengle (third round)
10. (Russia) Ksenia Pervak (first round)
11. (Chinese Taipei) Kai-Chen Chang (second round)
12. (Russia) Ksenia Lykina (second round)
13. (Belgium) Tamaryn Hendler (first round)
14. (Serbia) Bojana Jovanovski (first round)
15. (Israel) Julia Glushko (second round)
16. (United States) Reka Zsilinszka (third round)

== Draw ==
Key

- Q = Qualifier
- WC = Wild card
- LL = Lucky loser
- Alt = Alternate
- ITF = ITF entry
- PR = Protected ranking
- SR = Special ranking
- SE = Special exempt
- JE = Junior exempt
- JR = Junior Accelerator Programme entrant
- CO = College Accelerator Programme entrant
- NG = Next Gen Accelerator Program entrant
- w/o = Walkover
- r = Retired
- d = Defaulted

=== Finals ===
Quarterfinals
1	(Russia) Anastasia Pavlyuchenkova	6	7
8	(Austria) Nikola Hofmanova	2	5
Q	(Portugal) Michelle Larcher de Brito	1	4
(Colombia) Mariana Duque Mariño	6	6
6	(Belarus) Ksenia Milevskaya	6	6
(Croatia) Petra Martić	3	3
5	(Russia) Evgeniya Rodina	3	1
2/WC	(France) Alizé Cornet	6	6

Semifinals
1	(Russia) Anastasia Pavlyuchenkova	5	7^{7}	5
(Colombia) Mariana Duque Mariño	7	6^{0}	7
6	(Belarus) Ksenia Milevskaya	6	3	5
2/WC	(France) Alizé Cornet	2	6	7

Final
(Colombia) Mariana Duque Mariño	6	1	0
2/WC	(France) Alizé Cornet	4	6	6

=== Top half ===
==== Section 1 ====
First round
1	(Russia) A Pavlyuchenkova	6	6
WC	(France) C Rodier	2	2
(Hong Kong) L Zhang	2	1
(Switzerland) S Vögele	6	6
(United States) M Cecil	4	5
(Thailand) N Lertcheewakarn	6	7
(Australia) J Moore	6	6
13	(Belgium) T Hendler	3	2
12	(Russia) K Lykina	6	6
(Romania) I-C Begu	4	4
(United States) V Li	2	0
(Germany) D Ripoll	6	6
WC	(France) S Benamar	6	6
(Slovakia) K Kučová	2	0
(Argentina) T Bua	6	3	0
8	(Austria) N Hofmanova	2	6	6

Second round
1	(Russia) A Pavlyuchenkova	6	6
(Switzerland) S Vögele	4	1
(Thailand) N Lertcheewakarn	1	4
(Australia) J Moore	6	6
12	(Russia) K Lykina	3	2
(Germany) D Ripoll	6	6
WC	(France) S Benamar	4	3
8	(Austria) N Hofmanova	6	6

Third round
1	(Russia) A Pavlyuchenkova	6	6
(Australia) J Moore	4	3
(Germany) D Ripoll	6	4	4
8	(Austria) N Hofmanova	2	6	6

Quarterfinals
1	(Russia) A Pavlyuchenkova	6	7
8	(Austria) N Hofmanova	2	5

==== Section 2 ====
First round
4	(Romania) S Cîrstea	6	6
(France) V Larriere	1	1
(Georgia (country)) O Kalashnikova	6	7
(Russia) E Chernyakova	2	5
Q	(Portugal) M Larcher de Brito	6	6
(Ukraine) L Kichenok	4	1
WC	(France) N Mohn	3	6^{6}
15	(Israel) J Glushko	6	7^{8}
10	(Russia) K Pervak	4	6	5
(Colombia) M Duque Mariño	6	4	7
(Slovakia) K Boczová	6^{4}	7	7
(Poland) K Piter	7^{7}	5	5
WC	(France) A Goncalves	6	4	2
(Japan) S Akita	0	6	6
Q	(China) Y-M Zhou	7	6
7	(United States) J Cohen	5	2

Second round
4	(Romania) S Cîrstea	3	6	6
(Georgia (country)) O Kalashnikova	6	2	2
Q	(Portugal) M Larcher de Brito	4	6	6
15	(Israel) J Glushko	6	1	2
(Colombia) M Duque Mariño	3	7	7^{7}
(Slovakia) K Boczová	6	6^{4}	5
(Japan) S Akita	1	1
Q	(China) Y-M Zhou	6	6

Third round
4	(Romania) S Cîrstea	6	6^{5}	5
Q	(Portugal) M Larcher de Brito	2	7^{7}	7
(Colombia) M Duque Mariño	6	6
Q	(China) Y-M Zhou	4	1

Quarterfinals
Q	(Portugal) M Larcher de Brito	1	4
(Colombia) M Duque Mariño	6	6

=== Bottom half ===
==== Section 3 ====
First round
6	(Belarus) K Milevskaya	6	6
Q	(Slovakia) L Jurikova	4	4
(France) N Ciolkowski	3	0
(Poland) U Radwańska	6	6
(Japan) K Nara	4	6	6
(Russia) A Rodionova	6	3	2
Q	(France) C Sapene	1	1
9	(United States) M Brengle	6	6
14/Q	(Serbia) B Jovanovski	3	3
(Croatia) P Martić	6	6
(France) C Chala	6	3	6
(Ukraine) K Antoniychuk	3	6	4
Q	(United States) A Glatch	1	6	5
(Romania) S Halep	6	4	7
WC	(France) K Mladenovic	4	7^{8}	0
3	(Russia) A Pivovarova	6	6^{6}	6

Second round
6	(Belarus) K Milevskaya	6	6
(Poland) U Radwańska	2	2
(Japan) K Nara	1	5
9	(United States) M Brengle	6	7
(Croatia) P Martić	6	6
(France) C Chala	2	1
(Romania) S Halep	6	1	6
3	(Russia) A Pivovarova	4	6	3

Third round
6	(Belarus) K Milevskaya	7	6
9	(United States) M Brengle	5	0
(Croatia) P Martić	2	6	6
(Romania) S Halep	6	4	0

Quarterfinals
6	(Belarus) K Milevskaya	6	6
(Croatia) P Martić	3	3

==== Section 4 ====
First round
5	(Russia) E Rodina	6	6
(South Korea) S-H Han	2	1
(Argentina) M Gordo	6	3	6
WC	(France) G Radovanovic	1	6	4
(Australia) T Calderwood	1	1
Q	(Slovenia) P Hercog	6	6
WC	(France) A Hesse	6	3	3
11	(Chinese Taipei) K-C Chang	3	6	6
16	(United States) R Zsilinszka	7^{7}	4	7
LL	(Russia) V Solovieva	6^{4}	6	5
(Romania) I Ivan	1	0
(Netherlands) A Rus	6	6
Q	(Slovakia) R Tabakova	4	4
(Brazil) R Vaisemberg	6	6
(Ukraine) N Kichenok	0	0
2/WC	(France) A Cornet	6	6

Second round
5	(Russia) E Rodina	6	6
(Argentina) M Gordo	1	1
Q	(Slovenia) P Hercog	7^{7}	6
11	(Chinese Taipei) K-C Chang	6^{3}	3
16	(United States) R Zsilinszka	6	1	6
(Netherlands) A Rus	3	6	1
(Brazil) R Vaisemberg	1	1
2/WC	(France) A Cornet	6	6

Third round
5	(Russia) E Rodina	6	6^{3}	6
Q	(Slovenia) P Hercog	1	7^{7}	2
16	(United States) R Zsilinszka	2	1
2/WC	(France) A Cornet	6	6

Quarterfinals
5	(Russia) E Rodina	3	1
2/WC	(France) A Cornet	6	6
