= 2007 French Open – Girls' doubles =

Girls' doubles
- 2007 French Open

Final
- Champion: (Belarus) Ksenia Milevskaya (Poland) Urszula Radwańska
- Runner-up: (Romania) Sorana Cîrstea (United States) Alexa Glatch
- Score: 6-1, 6-4

Events
Singles	men	women		boys	girls
Doubles	men	women	mixed	boys	girls
WC Singles	men	women	quad
WC Doubles	men	women	quad
Legends	−45	45+	women
← 2006 ·	French Open	· 2008 →

Sharon Fichman and Anastasia Pavlyuchenkova were the defending champions, but did not participate in the juniors that year.

Ksenia Milevskaya and Urszula Radwańska won the title, defeating Sorana Cîrstea and Alexa Glatch in the final, 6–1, 6–4.

== Seeds ==
1. (United States) Madison Brengle / (United States) Julia Cohen (first round)
2. (Russia) Ksenia Lykina / (Russia) Anastasia Pivovarova (second round)
3. (Belarus) Ksenia Milevskaya / (Poland) Urszula Radwańska (champions)
4. (Russia) Evgeniya Rodina / (Russia) Arina Rodionova (first round)
5. (Ukraine) Khrystyna Antoniychuk / (Russia) Ksenia Pervak (second round)
6. (Israel) Julia Glushko / (Georgia (country)) Oksana Kalashnikova (first round)
7. (Slovakia) Klaudia Boczová / (Slovakia) Kristína Kučová (quarterfinals)
8. (United States) Mallory Cecil / (Hong Kong) Ling Zhang (first round)

== Draw ==
=== Key ===
- Q = Qualifier
- WC = Wild card
- LL = Lucky loser
- Alt = Alternate
- SE = Special exempt
- PR = Protected ranking
- ITF = ITF entry
- JE = Junior exempt
- w/o = Walkover
- r = Retired
- d = Defaulted
- SR = Special ranking

=== Finals ===
Quarterfinals
(Russia) Elena Chernyakova (Australia) Jessica Moore	2	6	1^{10}
(Thailand) Noppawan Lertcheewakarn (Switzerland) Stefanie Vögele	6	3	0^{1}
(Japan) Shiho Akita (Japan) Kurumi Nara	3	0
(Romania) Sorana Cîrstea (United States) Alexa Glatch	6	6
7	(Slovakia) Klaudia Boczová (Slovakia) Kristína Kučová	1	3
3	(Belarus) Ksenia Milevskaya (Poland) Urszula Radwańska	6	6
(Australia) Tyra Calderwood (United States) Reka Zsilinszka	3	4
(Slovakia) Lenka Jurikova (Poland) Katarzyna Piter	6	6

Semifinals
(Russia) Elena Chernyakova (Australia) Jessica Moore	7	0	0^{7}
(Romania) Sorana Cîrstea (United States) Alexa Glatch	6^{5}	6	1^{10}
3	(Belarus) Ksenia Milevskaya (Poland) Urszula Radwańska	6	6
(Slovakia) Lenka Jurikova (Poland) Katarzyna Piter	0	3

Final
(Romania) Sorana Cîrstea (United States) Alexa Glatch	1	4
3	(Belarus) Ksenia Milevskaya (Poland) Urszula Radwańska	6	6

=== Top half ===
==== Section 1 ====
First round
1	(United States) M Brengle (United States) J Cohen	6	3	0^{7}
(Russia) E Chernyakova (Australia) J Moore	2	6	1^{10}
WC	(France) L Marbach (France) J Sapene	1	1
(South Korea) S Han (China) Y Zhou	6	6
(Slovenia) P Hercog (Slovakia) R Tabakova	7	6
(Colombia) M Duque Marino (Argentina) M Gordo	6^{9}	1
(Thailand) N Lertcheewakarn (Switzerland) S Vögele	6	6
6	(Israel) J Glushko (Georgia (country)) O Kalashnikova	3	4

Second round
(Russia) E Chernyakova (Australia) J Moore	3	6	1^{10}
(South Korea) S Han (China) Y Zhou	6	3	0^{3}
(Slovenia) P Hercog (Slovakia) R Tabakova	6	1	0^{5}
(Thailand) N Lertcheewakarn (Switzerland) S Vögele	2	6	1^{10}

Quarterfinals
(Russia) E Chernyakova (Australia) J Moore	2	'6	1^{10}
(Thailand) N Lertcheewakarn (Switzerland) S Vögele	6	3	0^{1}

==== Section 2 ====
First round
4	(Russia) E Rodina (Russia) A Rodionova	4	6	0^{8}
(Romania) A Dulgheru (Romania) I Ivan	6	2	1^{10}
WC	(France) G Radovanovic (France) C Rodier	4	1
(Japan) S Akita (Japan) K Nara	6	6
(Romania) S Cîrstea (United States) A Glatch	6	6
WC	(France) C Babet (France) A Goncalves	4	0
(Australia) S Peers (Australia) B Sheed	3	4
5	(Ukraine) K Antoniychuk (Russia) K Pervak	6	6

Second round
(Romania) A Dulgheru (Romania) I Ivan	4	2
(Japan) S Akita (Japan) K Nara	6	6
(Romania) S Cîrstea (United States) A Glatch	6	6
5	(Ukraine) K Antoniychuk (Russia) K Pervak	0	1

Quarterfinals
(Japan) S Akita (Japan) K Nara	3	0
(Romania) S Cîrstea (United States) A Glatch	6	6

=== Bottom half ===
==== Section 3 ====
First round
7	(Slovakia) K Boczová (Slovakia) K Kučová	6	4	1^{10}
(Romania) I-C Begu (Romania) S Halep	1	6	0^{7}
(Belgium) T Hendler (Germany) D Ripoll	7	6
(Ukraine) L Kichenok (Ukraine) N Kichenok	5	4
(France) C Chala (France) V Larriere	5	6	0^{5}
(Chinese Taipei) K Chang (United States) V Li	7	2	1^{10}
(Argentina) T Búa (Brazil) R Vaisemberg	6^{4}	3
3	(Belarus) K Milevskaya (Poland) U Radwańska	7	6

Second round
7	(Slovakia) K Boczová (Slovakia) K Kučová	7	6
(Belgium) T Hendler (Germany) D Ripoll	5	2
(Chinese Taipei) K Chang (United States) V Li	5	4
3	(Belarus) K Milevskaya (Poland) U Radwańska	7	6

Quarterfinals
7	(Slovakia) K Boczová (Slovakia) K Kučová	1	3
3	(Belarus) K Milevskaya (Poland) U Radwańska	6	6

==== Section 4 ====
First round
8	(United States) M Cecil (Hong Kong) L Zhang	5	0
(Austria) N Hofmanova (Sweden) S Roma	7	6
WC	(France) A Hesse (France) K Mladenovic	6^{6}	5
(Australia) T Calderwood (United States) R Zsilinszka	7	7
(France) N Ciolkowski (France) C Sapene	6	2	0^{7}
(Slovakia) L Jurikova (Poland) K Piter	2	6	1^{10}
(Serbia) B Jovanovski (France) N Mohn	2	6	0^{4}
2	(Russia) K Lykina (Russia) A Pivovarova	6	4	1^{10}

Second round
(Austria) N Hofmanova (Sweden) S Roma	6	1	0^{10}
(Australia) T Calderwood (United States) R Zsilinszka	2	6	1^{12}
(Slovakia) L Jurikova (Poland) K Piter	3	6	1^{10}
2	(Russia) K Lykina (Russia) A Pivovarova	6	2	0^{8}

Quarterfinals
(Australia) T Calderwood (United States) R Zsilinszka	3	4
(Slovakia) L Jurikova (Poland) K Piter	6	6
