= Rosolski =

Rosolska (feminine:Rosolska) is a Polish surname. Notable people with the surname include:

- Sławomir Rosolski (born 1961), Polish architect, urbanist, professor of technical and engineering sciences
- Aleksandra Rosolska (born 1984), Polish tennis player
- Alicja Rosolska (born 1985), Polish tennis player, younger sister of Aleksandra
- Rafał Rosolski (born 1991), Polish canoeist
