= 2007 French Open – Boys' singles =

Tennis tournament

Boys' singles
- 2007 French Open

Final
- Champion: (Belarus) Uladzimir Ignatik
- Runner-up: (Australia) Greg Jones
- Score: 6-3, 6-4

Events
Singles	men	women		boys	girls
Doubles	men	women	mixed	boys	girls
WC Singles	men	women	quad
WC Doubles	men	women	quad
Legends	−45	45+	women
- French Open

In the 2007 French Open tennis tournament, the boys' singles competition was won by Uladzimir Ignatik of Belarus.

== Seeds ==
1. (Italy) Matteo Trevisan (semifinals)
2. (France) Jonathan Eysseric (third round)
3. (France) Stéphane Piro (third round)
4. (Brazil) Fernando Romboli (quarterfinals)
5. (Australia) Greg Jones (final)
6. (Australia) Brydan Klein (third round)
7. (Czech Republic) Roman Jebavý (second round)
8. (Australia) John-Patrick Smith (second round)
9. (Australia) Stephen Donald (first round)
10. (United States) Kellen Damico (semifinals)
11. (Romania) Petru-Alexandru Luncanu (third round)
12. (Belarus) Uladzimir Ignatik (champion)
13. (United States) Rhyne Williams (first round)
14. (Chile) Ricardo Urzúa-Rivera (second round)
15. (Lithuania) Ričardas Berankis (quarterfinals)
16. (Chile) Guillermo Rivera Aránguiz (first round)

== Draw ==
Key

- Q = Qualifier
- WC = Wild card
- LL = Lucky loser
- Alt = Alternate
- ITF = ITF entry
- PR = Protected ranking
- SR = Special ranking
- SE = Special exempt
- JE = Junior exempt
- JR = Junior Accelerator Programme entrant
- CO = College Accelerator Programme entrant
- NG = Next Gen Accelerator Program entrant
- w/o = Walkover
- r = Retired
- d = Defaulted

=== Final eight ===
Quarterfinals
1	(Italy) Matteo Trevisan	6	7
(Mexico) César Ramírez	3	6^{4}
(Russia) Vladimir Karusevich	5	3
5	(Australia) Greg Jones	7	6
10	(United States) Kellen Damico	6	6
4	(Brazil) Fernando Romboli	2	3
12	(Belarus) Uladzimir Ignatik	6	7
15	(Lithuania) Ričardas Berankis	1	6^{6}

Semifinals
1	(Italy) Matteo Trevisan	4	7	8
5	(Australia) Greg Jones	6	6	10
10	(United States) Kellen Damico	6	5	3
12	(Belarus) Uladzimir Ignatik	1	7	6

Final
5	(Australia) Greg Jones	3	4
12	(Belarus) Uladzimir Ignatik	6	6

=== Top half ===
==== Section 1 ====
First round
1	(Italy) Matteo Trevisan	6	6
(Indonesia) Christopher Rungkat	3	0
(United Kingdom) Graeme Dyce	6	6^{10}	4
(Thailand) Kittipong Wachiramanowong	4	7	6
WC	(France) Axel Michon	2	7	2
(Australia) Andrew Thomas	6	6^{9}	6
(South Africa) Damian Hume	2	3
14	(Chile) Ricardo Urzúa-Rivera	6	6
9	(Australia) Stephen Donald	4	3
(Belarus) Andrei Karatchenia	6	6
Q	(Hungary) Bence Gyula Toth	7	6
(Russia) Evgeny Donskoy	6^{4}	2
(United States) Johnny Hamui	5	3
(Mexico) César Ramírez	7	6
Q	(France) Alexis Klegou	4	5
7	(Czech Republic) Roman Jebavý	6	7

Second round
1	(Italy) M Trevisan	6	7
(Thailand) K Wachiramanowong	3	5
(Australia) A Thomas	6	6
14	(Chile) R Urzúa-Rivera	3	4
(Belarus) A Karatchenia	6	5	8
Q	(Hungary) B G Toth	2	7	10
(Mexico) C Ramírez	6	3	6
7	(Czech Republic) R Jebavý	3	6	4

Third round
1	(Italy) M Trevisan	3	6	6
(Australia) A Thomas	6	3	4
Q	(Hungary) B G Toth	4	2
(Mexico) C Ramírez	6	6

Quarterfinals
1	(Italy) M Trevisan	6	7
(Mexico) C Ramírez	3	6^{4}

==== Section 2 ====
First round
3	(France) Stéphane Piro	6	6
Q	(Slovakia) Eugen Brazdil	3	4
(Chile) Cristóbal Saavedra Corvalán	6	5	2
(Ecuador) Patricio Alvarado	0	7	2^{r}
(Netherlands) Thomas Schoorel	6	7
(Australia) Brendan Mckenzie	3	5
(Russia) Vladimir Karusevich	3	7	6
13	(United States) Rhyne Williams	6	5	2
11	(Romania) Petru-Alexandru Luncanu	6	6
(United Kingdom) Daniel Evans	2	3
WC	(France) Guillaume Rufin	6	6
(Slovenia) Janez Semrajc	3	4
(Brazil) Henrique Cunha	3	6^{5}
(United States) Mateusz Kecki	6	7
(Colombia) Alejandro González	3	3
5	(Australia) Greg Jones	6	6

Second round
3	(France) S Piro	6	7
(Chile) C Saavedra-Corvalán	3	5
(Netherlands) T Schoorel	4	5
(Russia) V Karusevich	6	7
11	(Romania) P-A Luncanu	6	6
WC	(France) G Rufin	0	1
(United States) M Kecki	4	6^{9}
5	(Australia) G Jones	6	7

Third round
3	(France) S Piro	3	0
(Russia) V Karusevich	6	6
11	(Romania) P-A Luncanu	5	2
5	(Australia) G Jones	7	6

Quarterfinals
(Russia) V Karusevich	5	3
5	(Australia) G Jones	7	6

=== Bottom half ===
==== Section 3 ====
First round
6	(Australia) Brydan Klein	6	4	6
WC	(France) Antoine Feret	2	6	1
(Thailand) Peerakiat Siriluethaiwattana	3	3
(Moldova) Radu Albot	6	6
Q	(Slovakia) Andrej Martin	3	6^{4}
WC	(France) Kevin Botti	6	7
Q	(Netherlands) Roy Bruggeling	3	3
10	(United States) Kellen Damico	6	6
16	(Chile) Guillermo Rivera Aránguiz	7	2	5
WC	(France) Benoît Paire	6^{2}	6	7
(Romania) Dragos Cristian Mirtea	1	6	6
(Portugal) Gastão Elias	6	3	4
WC	(France) Nysan Tan	2	6	3
Q	(Slovenia) Aljaž Bedene	6	2	6
(United Kingdom) Daniel Cox	2	3
4	(Brazil) Fernando Romboli	6	6

Second round
6	(Australia) B Klein	6	6
(Moldova) R Albot	2	1
WC	(France) K Botti	1	1
10	(United States) K Damico	6	6
WC	(France) B Paire	3	6	6
(Romania) D C Mirtea	6	0	2
Q	(Slovenia) A Bedene	2	4
4	(Brazil) F Romboli	6	6

Third round
6	(Australia) B Klein	6^{6}	4
10	(United States) K Damico	7	6
WC	(France) B Paire	4	4
4	(Brazil) F Romboli	6	6

Quarterfinals
10	(United States) K Damico	6	6
4	(Brazil) F Romboli	2	3

==== Section 4 ====
First round
8	(Australia) John-Patrick Smith	6	6
Q	(Croatia) Silvio Dadic	1	4
WC	(France) Jérôme Inzerillo	6	6
(United Kingdom) David Rice	2	4
(United States) Austin Krajicek	4	4
(South Korea) Soong-Jae Cho	6	6
(Chinese Taipei) Peng Hsien-yin	4	3
12	(Belarus) Uladzimir Ignatik	6	6
15	(Lithuania) Ričardas Berankis	7	6
(India) Rupesh Roy	6^{5}	2
WC	(France) Nassim Slilam	6	4	2
Q	(Australia) Bernard Tomic	2	6	6
(Russia) Danila Arsenov	0	2
(Italy) Thomas Fabbiano	6	6
(Madagascar) Lofo Ramiaramanan	1	1
2	(France) Jonathan Eysseric	6	6

Second round
8	(Australia) J-P Smith	4	6^{3}
WC	(France) J Inzerillo	6	7
(South Korea) S-J Cho	2	3
12	(Belarus) U Ignatik	6	6
15	(Lithuania) R Berankis	6	6
Q	(Australia) B Tomic	2	3
(Italy) T Fabbiano	5	1
2	(France) J Eysseric	7	6

Third round
WC	(France) J Inzerillo	3	6	2
12	(Belarus) U Ignatik	6	4	6
15	(Lithuania) R Berankis	6	3	6
2	(France) J Eysseric	3	6	3

Quarterfinals
12	(Belarus) U Ignatik	6	7
15	(Lithuania) R Berankis	1	6^{6}
