= Kellen Damico =

American tennis player

- Country (sports): United States
- Born: March 16, 1989 (age 36) Torrance, California, U.S.
- Plays: Right-handed (two-handed backhand)
- Prize money: $11,336

Singles
- Career record: 0–0
- Career titles: 0; 0 Challenger. 0 Futures
- Highest ranking: No. 1364 (October 22, 2007)

Doubles
- Career record: 0–2
- Career titles: 0; 0 Challenger. 0 Futures
- Highest ranking: No. 1361 (June 11, 2007)

Grand Slam doubles results
- US Open: 1R (2006, 2007)
- Last updated on: August 4, 2021.

Kellen Damico (born March 16, 1989) is an American former professional tennis player. Alongside Nathaniel Schnugg he won the 2006 Wimbledon Championships junior doubles title.

== Junior career ==
Damico reached an ITF junior high combined ranking of World No. 5, on January 1, 2007.

Damico and partner Nathaniel Schnugg won the 2006 Wimbledon Championships boys' doubles title and were runners-up of the 2006 Australian Open tournament. The following year Damico and partner Jonathan Eysseric reached the semi-finals of the 2007 French Open – Boys' doubles tournament.

Damico's best singles result as a junior was reaching the semi-finals of the 2007 French Open – Boys' singles tournament, as the No. 10 seed, where he lost to eventual champion Uladzimir Ignatik in a third set tie-break. At Wimbledon that year he reached the third round.

== Senior tennis ==
Damico has only played a handful of senior tour events, twice in the U.S. Open as a wildcard in doubles with Schnugg, and in a handful of ITF Futures tournaments. He played all these events while still junior age and has not played an event since August 2007.

At the Open, Damico and Schnugg lost both times in the first round, 5–7, 2–6 to David Ferrer and Fernando Vicente in 2006 and 4–6, 2–6 to Jonas Björkman and Max Mirnyi the following year, in what has been Damico's last world tour match, to date. His best Futures event result was reaching the second round, which he did in doubles in three of five tournaments played and in singles in four out of five events. His best singles win was beating World No. 306 Travis Rettenmaier 7–6, 6–2 in May 2006 in Tampa (U.S.A. F11).

== College tennis ==
Damico finished his junior year at the University of Texas at Austin where he plays for the Texas Longhorns tennis team. His current Intercollegiate Tennis Association singles ranking, released May 3, 2010, is No. 99 and his doubles ranking is No. 40. He finished his sophomore year ranked No. 80 in singles.

His Longhorns player bio lists Damico's hometown as Parker, Colorado.

== Personal ==
Kellen's sister Krista Damico also played top-level junior tennis. Her best result was reaching the second round of the 2008 Easter Bowl.

== Junior Grand Slam finals ==
=== Doubles: 3 (1 title, 2 runner-ups) ===
Result	Year	Tournament	Surface	Partner	Opponent	Score
Loss	2006	Australian Open	Hard	(United States) Nathaniel Schnugg	(Poland) Blazej Koniusz (Poland) Grzegorz Panfil	6–7^{(5–7)}, 3–6
Win	2006	Wimbledon	Grass	(United States) Nathaniel Schnugg	(Slovakia) Martin Klizan (Slovakia) Andrej Martin	7–6^{(9–7)}, 6–2
Loss	2007	French Open	Clay	(France) Jonathan Eysseric	(Italy) Thomas Fabbiano (Belarus) Andrei Karatchenia	4–6, 0–6
