= 2007 French Open – Boys' doubles =

Boys' doubles
- 2007 French Open

Final
- Champion: (Italy) Thomas Fabbiano (Belarus) Andrei Karatchenia
- Runner-up: (United States) Kellen Damico (France) Jonathan Eysseric
- Score: 6-4, 6-0

Events
Singles	men	women		boys	girls
Doubles	men	women	mixed	boys	girls
WC Singles	men	women	quad
WC Doubles	men	women	quad
Legends	−45	45+	women
- French Open

The 2007 French Open boys' doubles junior tennis competition was won by Thomas Fabbiano of Italy and Andrei Karatchenia of Belarus.

== Seeds ==
1. (Czech Republic) Roman Jebavý / (Italy) Matteo Trevisan (quarterfinals)
2. (United States) Kellen Damico / (France) Jonathan Eysseric (final)
3. (Australia) Greg Jones / (Australia) Brydan Klein (first round)
4. (Australia) Stephen Donald / (Australia) John-Patrick Smith (semifinals)
5. (Chile) Guillermo Rivera Aránguiz / (Chile) Ricardo Urzúa-Rivera (quarterfinals)
6. (Ecuador) Patricio Alvarado / (Brazil) Fernando Romboli (second round)
7. (United States) Johnny Hamui / (Romania) Petru-Alexandru Luncanu (second round)
8. (Moldova) Radu Albot / (Romania) Dragos Cristian Mirtea (first round)

== Draw ==
Key

- Q = Qualifier
- WC = Wild card
- LL = Lucky loser
- Alt = Alternate
- ITF = ITF entry
- PR = Protected ranking
- SR = Special ranking
- SE = Special exempt
- JE = Junior exempt
- JR = Junior Accelerator Programme entrant
- CO = College Accelerator Programme entrant
- NG = Next Gen Accelerator Program entrant
- w/o = Walkover
- r = Retired
- d = Defaulted

=== Final eight ===
Quarterfinals
1	(Czech Republic) Roman Jebavý (Italy) Matteo Trevisan	5	6	0^{9}
(Italy) Thomas Fabbiano (Belarus) Andrei Karatchenia	7	2	1^{11}
4	(Australia) Stephen Donald (Australia) John-Patrick Smith	6	4	1^{10}
(Netherlands) Roy Bruggeling (Netherlands) Thomas Schoorel	1	6	0^{6}
5	(Chile) Guillermo Rivera Aránguiz (Chile) Ricardo Urzúa-Rivera	7	4	0^{5}
(Slovenia) Aljaž Bedene (Slovakia) Andrej Martin	6^{4}	6	1^{10}
(Russia) Evgeny Donskoy (Russia) Vladimir Karusevich	6^{2}	0
2	(United States) Kellen Damico (France) Jonathan Eysseric	7	6

Semifinals
(Italy) Thomas Fabbiano (Belarus) Andrei Karatchenia	6	6
4	(Australia) Stephen Donald (Australia) John-Patrick Smith	2	3
(Slovenia) Aljaž Bedene (Slovakia) Andrej Martin	5	6^{1}
2	(United States) Kellen Damico (France) Jonathan Eysseric	7	7

Final
(Italy) Thomas Fabbiano (Belarus) Andrei Karatchenia	6	6
2	(United States) Kellen Damico (France) Jonathan Eysseric	4	0

=== Top half ===
==== Section 1 ====
First round
1	(Czech Republic) Roman Jebavý (Italy) Matteo Trevisan	6	5	1^{10}
(Lithuania) Ričardas Berankis (Indonesia) Christopher Rungkat	3	7	0^{3}
(France) Jérôme Inzerillo (France) Stéphane Piro	3	2
(Australia) Ben Mckenzie (Australia) Bernard Tomic	6	6
(Brazil) Henrique Cunha (Colombia) Alejandro González	3	2
(Italy) Thomas Fabbiano (Belarus) Andrei Karatchenia	6	6
(United States) Austin Krajicek (United States) Rhyne Williams	3	7	0^{7}
7	(United States) Johnny Hamui (Romania) Petru-Alexandru Luncanu	6	5	1^{10}

Second round
1	(Czech Republic) R Jebavý (Italy) M Trevisan	6	7
(Australia) B Mckenzie (Australia) B Tomic	2	6^{5}
(Italy) T Fabbiano (Belarus) A Karatchenia	2	7	1^{10}
7	(United States) J Hamui (Romania) P Luncanu	6	6^{4}	0^{8}

Quarterfinals
1	(Czech Republic) R Jebavý (Italy) M Trevisan	5	6	0^{9}
(Italy) T Fabbiano (Belarus) A Karatchenia	7	2	1^{11}

==== Section 2 ====
First round
4	(Australia) Stephen Donald (Australia) John-Patrick Smith	6	6
(Croatia) Silvio Dadic (Chinese Taipei) Hsieh Cheng-peng	4	4
(Mexico) César Ramírez (Chile) Cristóbal Saavedra Corvalán	6	6
(South Africa) Damian Hume (Madagascar) Logo Ramiaramanan	2	4
(United Kingdom) Daniel Evans (United Kingdom) David Rice	4	7	0^{8}
(Netherlands) Roy Bruggeling (Netherlands) Thomas Schoorel	6	6^{4}	1^{10}
(France) Benoît Paire (France) Nassim Slilam	1	6	1^{10}
8	(Moldova) Radu Albot (Romania) Dragos Cristian Mirtea	6	2	0^{8}

Second round
4	(Australia) S Donald (Australia) J-P Smith	6	6
(Mexico) C Ramírez (Chile) C Saavedra-Corvalán	0	4
(Netherlands) R Bruggeling (Netherlands) T Schoorel	6	6
(France) B Paire (France) N Slilam	3	3

Quarterfinals
4	(Australia) S Donald (Australia) J-P Smith	6	4	1^{10}
(Netherlands) R Bruggeling (Netherlands) T Schoorel	1	6	0^{5}

=== Bottom half ===
==== Section 3 ====
First round
5	(Chile) Guillermo Rivera Aránguiz (Chile) Ricardo Urzúa-Rivera	4	6	1^{10}
(Slovenia) Janez Semrajc (Hungary) Bence Gyula Toth	6	1	0^{8}
(United Kingdom) Daniel Cox (Portugal) Gastão Elias	6	6
(France) Axel Michon (France) Guillaume Rufin	4	2
(Thailand) Peerakiat Siriluethaiwattana (Australia) Andrew Thomas	4	1
(Slovenia) Aljaž Bedene (Slovakia) Andrej Martin	6	6
(Belarus) Vladimir Ignatic (India) Rupesh Roy	1	6	1^{10}
3	(Australia) Greg Jones (Australia) Brydan Klein	6	3	0^{4}

Second round
5	(Chile) G Rivera Aránguiz (Chile) R Urzúa-Rivera	6	6
(United Kingdom) D Cox (Portugal) G Elias	0	1
(Slovenia) A Bedene (Slovakia) A Martin	6	1	1^{10}
(Belarus) V Ignatic (India) R Roy	0	6	0^{8}

Quarterfinals
5	(Chile) G Rivera Aránguiz (Chile) R Urzúa-Rivera	7	4	0^{5}
(Slovenia) A Bedene (Slovakia) A Martin	6^{4}	6	1^{10}

==== Section 4 ====
First round
6	(Ecuador) Patricio Alvarado (Brazil) Fernando Romboli	6	6
(South Korea) Soong-Jae Cho (Thailand) Kittipong Wachiramanowong	1	4
(Russia) Evgeny Donskoy (Russia) Vladimir Karusevich	6	6
(France) Alexis Klegou (France) Nysan Tan	3	3
(Slovakia) Eugen Brazdil (United Kingdom) Graeme Dyce	6	1	0^{7}
(Russia) Danila Arsenov (United States) Mateusz Kecki	2	6	1^{10}
(France) Julien Obry (France) Adrien Puget	6^{3}	6^{2}
2	(United States) Kellen Damico (France) Jonathan Eysseric	7	7

Second round
6	(Ecuador) P Alvarado (Brazil) F Romboli	4	3
(Russia) E Donskoy (Russia) V Karusevich	6	6
(Russia) D Arsenov (United States) M Kecki	0	3
2	(United States) K Damico (France) J Eysseric	6	6

Quarterfinals
(Russia) E Donskoy (Russia) V Karusevich	6^{2}	0
2	(United States) K Damico (France) J Eysseric	7	6
