= Ksenia Milevskaya =

Belarusian tennis player

Ksenia Milevskaya Ксенія Мілеўская
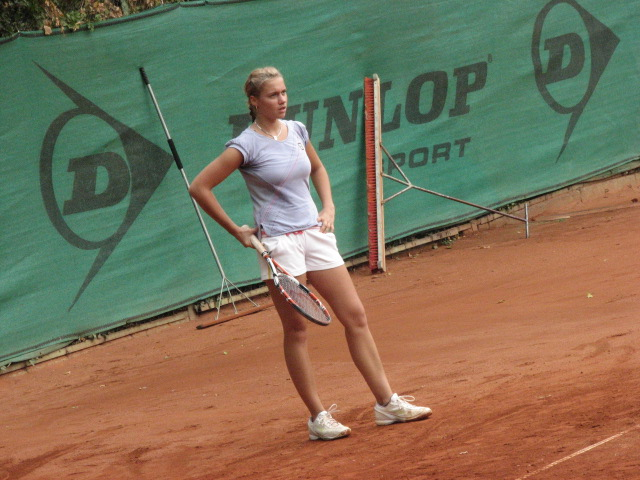
- Country (sports): Belarus
- Residence: Minsk, Belarus
- Born: 9 August 1990 (age 36) Minsk, Belarusian SSR, Soviet Union
- Height: 1.72 m (5 ft 8 in)
- Plays: Right (two-handed backhand)
- Prize money: $72,810

Singles
- Career record: 124–92
- Career titles: 6 ITF
- Highest ranking: No. 227 (6 April 2009)

Doubles
- Career record: 132–67
- Career titles: 10 ITF
- Highest ranking: No. 148 (14 September 2009)

Team competitions
- Fed Cup: 4–1

Ksenia Milevskaya (Belarusian: Ксенія Мілеўская; Russian: Ксения Милевская; born 9 August 1990) is a former tennis player from Belarus.

On 9 June 2007, Milevskaya and Urszula Radwańska won the 2007 French Open – Girls' doubles title, beating Sorana Cîrstea and Alexa Glatch in the final, and on 8 September 2007, they continued their unbeaten match-streak as a doubles team by winning the 2007 US Open – Girls' doubles title, beating Oksana Kalashnikova and Ksenia Lykina in the final.

In singles competitions at the juniors level, Milevskaya has lost in the semifinals of three of the 2007 majors – the Australian Open, the French Open, and the US Open, losing to Madison Brengle, Alizé Cornet, and her doubles partner Urszula Radwańska, respectively. In 2006, she made it to the Orange Bowl singles final, but lost in straight sets to Nikola Hofmanova.

As of 9 September 2007, she was the second ranked junior of the world.

She lived in Minsk and trained at the Weil Tennis Academy & College Prep School in Ojai, California, United States, where her coach was Nicolas Beuque. Her brother, Artem Milevskyi, played for the Ukraine national football team.

== ITF Circuit finals ==
Legend
$50,000 tournaments
$25,000 tournaments
$10,000 tournaments

=== Singles (6–4) ===
Result	No.	Date	Tournament	Surface	Opponent	Score
Win	1.	20 May 2007	ITF Falkenberg, Sweden	Clay	(Germany) Anne Schäfer	6–4, 6–4
Loss	1.	22 July 2007	Contrexéville Open, France	Clay	(Germany) Andrea Petkovic	2–6, 0–6
Win	2.	10 May 2008	ITF Antalya, Turkey	Clay	(Netherlands) Michelle Gerards	6–2, 6–2
Win	3.	20 July 2008	ITF Zwevegem, Belgium	Clay	(Netherlands) Arantxa Rus	6–4, 3–6, 7–6^{(5)}
Loss	2.	5 July 2009	Bella Cup, Poland	Clay	(Georgia (country)) Oksana Kalashnikova	6–3, 4–6, 2–6
Loss	3.	8 May 2011	ITF Istanbul, Turkey	Hard	(Georgia (country)) Sofia Kvatsabaia	2–6, 1–6
Loss	4.	3 December 2011	ITF Antalya, Turkey	Clay	(Belarus) Ilona Kremen	6–7^{(6)}, 7–6^{(4)}, 1–6
Win	4.	22 April 2012	ITF Les Franqueses del Vallès, Spain	Hard	(Belarus) Anastasiya Yakimova	7–5, 6–7^{(7)}, 6–4
Win	5.	29 April 2012	ITF Vic, Spain	Clay	(Belarus) Anastasiya Yakimova	6–4, 6–2
Win	6.	2 June 2012	ITF Karshi, Uzbekistan	Hard	(Ukraine) Nadiia Kichenok	6–4, 7–5

=== Doubles (10–11) ===
Result	No.	Date	Tournament	Surface	Partner	Opponents	Score
Win	1.	16 June 2007	Open de Marseille, France	Clay	(Brazil) Roxane Vaisemberg	(Argentina) Salome Llaguno (France) Nadege Vergos	6–2, 6–1
Loss	1.	21 July 2007	Contrexéville Open, France	Clay	(Belarus) Ekaterina Dzehalevich	(Czech Republic) Renata Voráčová (Czech Republic) Barbora Záhlavová-Strýcová	2–6, 2–6
Loss	2.	20 October 2007	Open de Saint-Raphaël, France	Hard (i)	(Georgia (country)) Margalita Chakhnashvili	(United States) Lilia Osterloh (Russia) Ekaterina Makarova	2–6, 2–6
Loss	3.	9 February 2008	ITF Cali, Colombia	Clay	(Austria) Melanie Klaffner	(Argentina) Mailen Auroux (Uruguay) Estefanía Craciún	1–6, 4–6
Loss	4.	8 March 2008	ITF Minsk, Belarus	Carpet (i)	(Belarus) Ima Bohush	(Ukraine) Yuliya Beygelzimer (Russia) Anna Lapushchenkova	4–6, 5–7
Win	2.	15 March 2008	ITF Rome, Italy	Clay	(Romania) Ioana Ivan	(Italy) Stefania Chieppa (Italy) Valentina Sulpizio	6–3, 7–6
Win	3.	21 March 2008	ITF Rome	Clay	(Poland) Magdalena Kiszczyńska	(Italy) Giulia Gatto-Monticone (Italy) Federica Quercia	6–0, 6–4
Win	4.	9 May 2008	ITF Antalya	Clay	(Austria) Melanie Klaffner	(Georgia (country)) Oksana Kalashnikova (Turkey) Pemra Özgen	6–2, 7–5
Loss	5.	15 February 2009	ITF Stockholm, Sweden	Hard (i)	(Austria) Melanie Klaffner	(France) Violette Huck (Finland) Emma Laine	6–3, 6–7^{(5)}, [8–10]
Win	5.	5 April 2009	ITF Khanty-Mansiysk, Russia	Carpet (i)	(Ukraine) Lesia Tsurenko	(Georgia (country)) Oksana Kalashnikova (Russia) Valeria Savinykh	6–2, 6–3
Loss	6.	10 May 2009	Zagreb Open, Croatia	Clay	(Russia) Anastasia Pivovarova	(Croatia) Petra Martić (Croatia) Ajla Tomljanović	3–6, 7–6, [5–10]
Win	6.	23 May 2009	ITF Kharkiv, Ukraine	Clay	(Ukraine) Lesia Tsurenko	(Ukraine) Lyudmyla Kichenok (Ukraine) Nadiia Kichenok	6–4, 6–4
Win	7.	4 July 2009	Bella Cup, Poland	Clay	(Ukraine) Yuliya Beygelzimer	(Poland) Karolina Kosińska (Poland) Aleksandra Rosolska	6–1, 6–4
Loss	7.	11 July 2009	ITF La Coruña, Spain	Hard	(Serbia) Vesna Dolonc	(Argentina) María Irigoyen (Argentina) Florencia Molinero	2–6, 4–6
Win	8.	13 February 2010	ITF Stockholm, Sweden	Hard (i)	(Ukraine) Lesia Tsurenko	(Austria) Nikola Hofmanova (Austria) Yvonne Meusburger	6–4, 7–5
Loss	8.	17 April 2010	ITF Cairo, Egypt	Clay	(Slovakia) Lenka Wienerová	(Czech Republic) Eva Birnerová (Czech Republic) Renata Voráčová	6–7^{(4)}, 4–6
Loss	9.	8 May 2010	ITF Jounieh Open, Lebanon	Clay	(Ukraine) Lesia Tsurenko	(Czech Republic) Petra Cetkovská (Czech Republic) Renata Voráčová	4–6, 2–6
Win	9.	21 May 2010	ITF Kharkiv, Ukraine	Clay	(Ukraine) Katerina Avdiyenko	(Ukraine) Lyudmyla Kichenok (Ukraine) Nadiia Kichenok	6–4, 6–2
Loss	10.	10 June 2010	ITF Karshi, Uzbekistan	Hard	(Ukraine) Ganna Piven	(Russia) Natela Dzalamidze (Russia) Daria Kuchmina	2–6, 6–2, [9–11]
Win	10.	25 February 2012	ITF Antalya, Turkey	Clay	(Ukraine) Yuliya Beygelzimer	(Chinese Taipei) Lee Hua-chen (Chinese Taipei) Lee Pei-chi	6–3, 7–6^{(4)}
Loss	11.	6 April 2012	ITF Torrent, Spain	Clay	(Russia) Anastasia Mukhametova	(Spain) Yvonne Cavallé Reimers (Spain) Isabel Rapisarda Calvo	6–4, 6–7^{(3)}, [8–10]

== Junior Grand Slam finals ==
=== Doubles: 2 (2 titles) ===
Outcome	Year	Championship	Surface	Partner	Opponents	Score
Winner	2007	French Open	Clay	(Poland) Urszula Radwańska	(Romania) Sorana Cîrstea (United States) Alexa Glatch	6–1, 6–4
Winner	2007	US Open	Hard	(Poland) Urszula Radwańska	(Georgia (country)) Oksana Kalashnikova (Russia) Ksenia Lykina	6–1, 6–2
