= Aleksandra Rosolska =

Polish tennis player (born 1984)

- Country (sports): Poland
- Born: 17 November 1984 (age 41) Warsaw, Poland
- Turned pro: 2005
- Retired: 2013
- Plays: Right (two-handed backhand)
- Prize money: $11,839

Singles
- Career record: 15–24
- Career titles: 0
- Highest ranking: No. 993 (3 December 2007)

Doubles
- Career record: 33–32
- Career titles: 2 ITF
- Highest ranking: No. 307 (17 August 2009)

Aleksandra Rosolska (Polish pronunciation: [alɛˈksandra rɔˈsɔlska]; born 17 November 1984) is a Polish retired tennis player and padel player.

Rosolska has won two doubles titles on the ITF Circuit in her career. On 17 August 2009, she peaked at No. 307 in the WTA doubles rankings.

Rosolska made her WTA Tour main-draw debut at the 2009 Warsaw Open, in the doubles event partnering Karolina Kosińska.

Her sister, Alicja Rosolska, is also a tennis player.

== ITF Circuit finals ==
$100,000 tournaments
$75,000 tournaments
$50,000 tournaments
$25,000 tournaments
$10,000 tournaments

=== Singles (0–1) ===
Result	No.	Date	Tournament	Surface	Opponent	Score
Loss	1.	17 August 2008	ITF Iława, Poland	Clay	(Slovakia) Romana Tabak	3–6, 6–4, 1–6

=== Doubles (2–5) ===
Result	No.	Date	Tournament	Surface	Partner	Opponents	Score
Loss	1.	25 August 2008	ITF Katowice, Poland	Clay	(Poland) Karolina Kosińska	(Latvia) Anastasija Sevastova (Slovakia) Lenka Wienerová	7–5, 3–6, [3–10]
Win	1.	23 November 2008	ITF Opole, Poland	Carpet (i)	(Poland) Karolina Kosińska	(Poland) Katarzyna Piter (Netherlands) Arantxa Rus	2–6, 7–6^{(6)}, [10–7]
Win	2.	30 May 2009	ITF Olecko, Poland	Clay	(Poland) Karolina Kosińska	(Poland) Veronika Domagała (Australia) Karolina Wlodarczak	2–6, 6–2, [11–9]
Loss	2.	3 July 2009	ITF Toruń, Poland	Clay	(Poland) Karolina Kosińska	(Ukraine) Yuliya Beygelzimer (Belarus) Ksenia Milevskaya	1–6, 4–6
Loss	3.	3 August 2009	ITF Iława, Poland	Clay	(Poland) Anna Niemiec	(Poland) Veronika Domagała (Poland) Katarzyna Kawa	1–6, 3–6
Loss	4.	7 August 2011	ITF Iława, Poland	Clay	(Poland) Karolina Kosińska	(Vietnam) Huỳnh Phương Đài Trang (Poland) Magdalena Kiszczyńska	6–2, 3–6, [7–10]
Loss	5.	28 May 2012	ITF Warsaw, Poland	Clay	(Poland) Karolina Kosińska	(United States) Caitlin Whoriskey (Belgium) Elyne Boeykens	2–6, 2–6
