= Romana Tabak =

Slovak tennis player

Romana Tabák
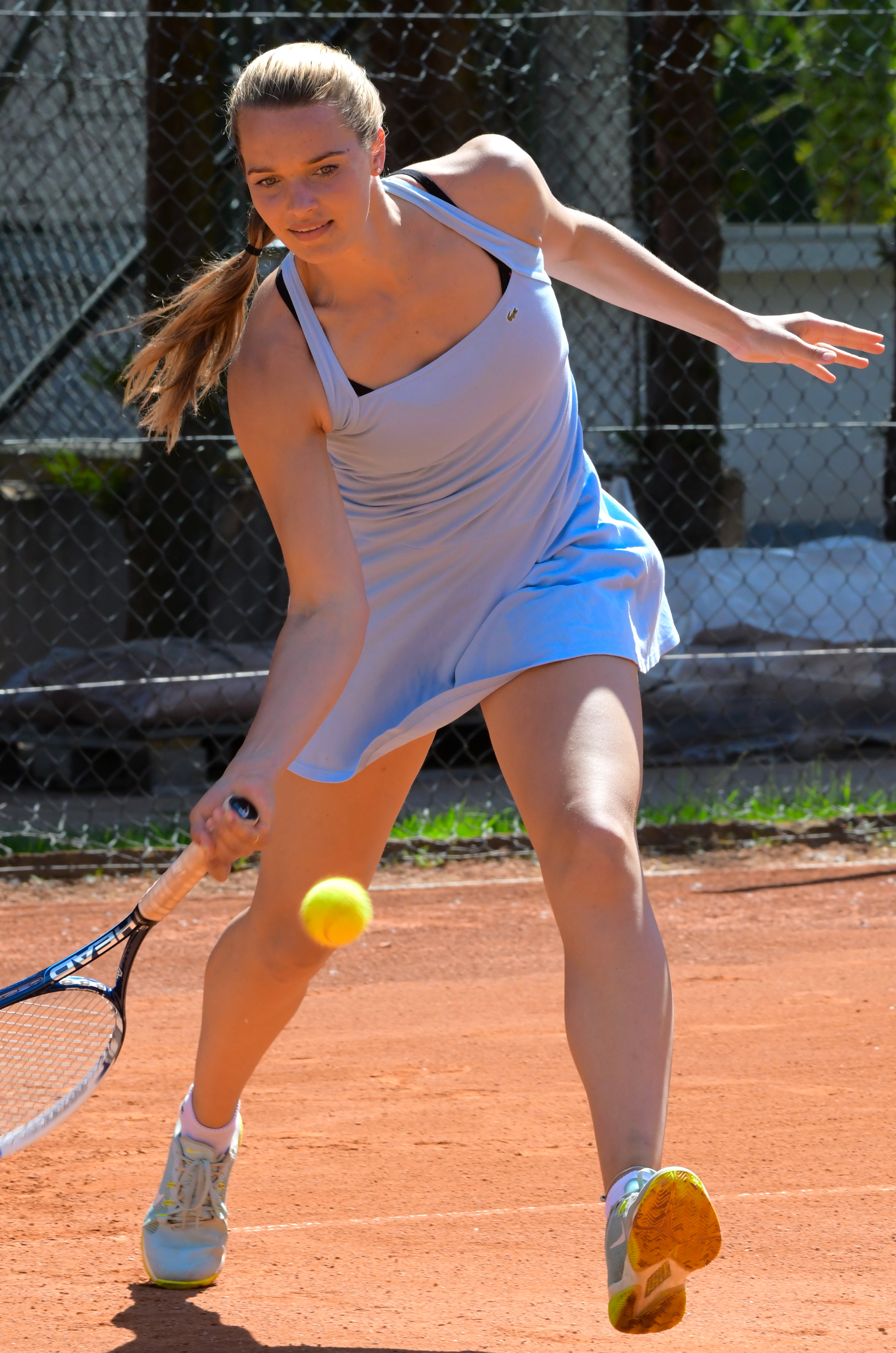
- Born: 7 May 1991 (age 35); Bratislava, Czechoslovakia
- Education: Concordia College
- Children: 1

Member of the National Council
- In office 21 March 2020 – 25 October 2023

Personal details
- Party: Ordinary People and Independent Personalities (2020-2022); We Are Family (2022-2023); Slovak National Party (2023-)
- Tennis career
- Full name: Romana Caroline Tabak
- Country (sports): Slovakia
- Residence: Bratislava, Slovakia
- Height: 1.79 m (5 ft 10 1/2 in)
- Turned pro: 2005
- Plays: Right (two-handed backhand)
- Prize money: $42,131

Singles
- Career record: 113–74
- Career titles: 6 ITF
- Highest ranking: No. 240 (27 February 2012)

Doubles
- Career record: 52–40
- Career titles: 5 ITF
- Highest ranking: No. 313 (17 August 2009)

Romana Tabák (Slovak pronunciation: [ˈrɔmana ˈtabak]) or Romana Tabáková ([- ˈtabakɔʋaː]; born 7 May 1991) is a Slovak politician and former professional tennis player. She is a former junior world No. 36, achieving that ranking in March 2008. Her career-high ranking of world No. 240 was achieved February 2012.

== Political career ==
On 29 February 2020, Tabák got elected in parliamentary elections and became a member of the National Council of the Slovak Republic for the political party Ordinary People along with fellow Slovak tennis players Karol Kučera and Ján Krošlák. In May 2022, she was expelled from the party, after voting against the potential prosecution of former prime minister Robert Fico in custody. In August, she joined the parliamentary caucus of the We Are Family party. In March 2023, she left the caucus over her opposition to donating Slovak MIG 29 fighter jets to Ukraine, which We Are Family supported.

In late September 2022, Tabak was legally accused by a Freedom and Solidarity MP Jana Bittó Cigániková of assault in a nightclub. She was sentenced of a misdemeanor and ordered to pay a 30 euro fine as a result of the attack.

Tabak did not run for re-election in the 2023 parliamentary election, but announced she was joining the right wing Slovak National Party. She was also featured in advertisements for the party's electoral campaign and declared that she will run for the party in the 2024 European Parliament election. She ran in fifth place on the party's electoral list but was not elected as her party failed to pass the 5% threshold.

== Personal life ==
Tabak was a contestant in 2007 in Slovakia's Next Top Model, but withdrew after a few episodes because of parental disapproval.

=== Charitable activities ===
Tabak took part in missionary trips to India, Africa and Brazil and she aided Ukrainian refugees at the Main Railway Station in Bratislava in March and April 2022.

== Tennis career ==
=== ITF finals ===
Legend
$50,000 tournaments
$25,000 tournaments
$10,000 tournaments

==== Singles (6–3) ====
Result	No.	Date	Tournament	Tier	Surface	Opponent	Score
Loss	1.	11 May 2008	ITF Michalovce, Slovakia	10,000	Clay	(Slovakia) Klaudia Boczová	2–6, 3–6
Win	1.	17 August 2008	ITF Iława, Poland	10,000	Clay	(Poland) Aleksandra Rosolska	6–3, 4–6, 6–1
Win	2.	2 May 2010	ITF Bournemouth, UK	10,000	Clay	(United Kingdom) Lisa Whybourn	6–1, 6–7^{(7)}, 7–6^{(7)}
Loss	2.	1 May 2011	ITF Bournemouth, UK	10,000	Clay	(Germany) Scarlett Werner	3–6, 5–7
Win	3.	14 May 2011	ITF Båstad, Sweden	10,000	Clay	(Poland) Olga Brózda	7–5, 6–7^{(2)}, 6–2
Win	4.	5 November 2011	Asunción Open, Paraguay	10,000	Clay	(Argentina) María Irigoyen	5–7, 7–6^{(7)}, 7–5
Win	5.	12 November 2011	Asunción Open	10,000	Clay	(Austria) Tina Schiechtl	6–7^{(4)}, 6–4, 6–4
Win	6.	19 November 2011	Asunción Open	25,000	Clay	(Argentina) Florencia Molinero	6–1, 6–0
Loss	3.	10 December 2011	ITF Buenos Aires, Argentina	25,000	Clay	(United States) Julia Cohen	5–7, 2–6

==== Doubles (5–4) ====
Result	No.	Date	Tournament	Tier	Surface	Partner	Opponents	Score
Win	1.	14 October 2007	ITF Espinho, Portugal	10k	Clay	(Poland) Sylwia Zagórska	(Armenia) Liudmila Nikoyan (Russia) Inna Sokolova	3–6, 6–1, [10–4]
Loss	1.	11 May 2008	ITF Michalovce, Slovakia	10k	Clay	(Slovakia) Nikola Vajdova	(Slovakia) Lenka Jurikova (Poland) Katarzyna Piter	1–6, 1–6
Win	2.	18 May 2008	ITF Bucharest, Romania	10k	Clay	(Slovakia) Klaudia Boczová	(Romania) Ioana Gașpar (Brazil) Vivian Segnini	6–2, 6–0
Win	3.	16 August 2008	ITF Iława, Poland	10k	Clay	(Belarus) Ima Bohush	(South Africa) Lisa Marshall (Armenia) Anna Movsisyan	6–3, 6–2
Loss	2.	6 June 2009	ITF Brno, Czech Republic	25k	Clay	(Slovakia) Karin Morgosová	(Australia) Sophie Ferguson (Australia) Trudi Musgrave	4–6, 1–6
Win	4.	6 March 2010	ITF Antalya, Turkey	10k	Clay	(Slovakia) Michaela Pochabová	(Romania) Diana Marcu (Romania) Simona Matei	6–1, 6–1
Loss	3.	18 April 2010	ITF Bol, Croatia	10k	Clay	(Slovakia) Chantal Škamlová	(Romania) Alexandra Cadanțu (Romania) Alexandra Damaschin	2–6, 6–1, [5–10]
Loss	4.	25 June 2011	ITF Lenzerheide, Switzerland	25k	Clay	(Austria) Nikola Hofmanova	(Croatia) Ani Mijačika (Switzerland) Amra Sadiković	6–4, 2–6, [4–10]
Win	5.	18 May 2012	ITF Caserta, Italy	25k	Clay	(Poland) Katarzyna Piter	(Serbia) Aleksandra Krunić (Switzerland) Viktorija Golubic	6–2, 6–4

=== Junior titles ===
Singles:

- Winner (2): 2007 – Piešťany – Grade 2, Prato – Grade 2

Doubles:

- Winner (2): 2008 – Umag – Grade 1 (w./Toljan); 2006 – Bratislava – Grade 4 (w./Tereza Budilova)

=== Awards ===
- 2008: Junior Tennis Player of the Year in Slovak Republic

=== Career in review ===
- 2003 – finished at No. 3 in Slovak ranking (U12)
- 2004 – won one singles title in tournament in Slovakia, runner-up one time
- 2005 – finished at No. 9 in Slovak ranking (U14); won five singles titles, runner-up two times
- 2006 – finished at No. 13 in Slovak ranking (U18); won two singles titles, runner-up two times, played her first ITF junior tournament in Bratislava as WC, also won her first doubles title in junior tournament Bratislava, Grade 4
- 2007 – finished at No. 4 in Slovak ranking (U18), won two junior tournaments Grade 2 in Pieštany (def. Lenka Juríková in final) and Prato (d. Bojanovski in final), made junior Grand Slam main-draw debut at Wimbledon, made top 100 debut in ITF ranking in May 2007, played in European Junior Championships U16, also played her first ITF tournament in Maribor, reached 1st round as qualifier (d. Anikó Kapros and Kristína Kučová in qualifying; l. to Lenka Tvarošková), won her first ITF doubles title in Espinho (w./Zagórska) in October
- 2008 – finished at No. 1 in Slovak ranking (U18), at No. 46 in ITF ranking, at No. 588 in WTA singles ranking and at No. 481 in WTA doubles ranking, played all four junior Grand Slam tournaments: French Open – doubles SF (w./Juríková); Wimbledon – singles SF (l. to Laura Robson) – played in European Junior Championships U18, won junior doubles title Grade 1 (w./Toljan) in Umag, won one ITF singles titles in Ilawa (d. Aleksandra Rosolska in final) and two ITF doubles titles in Bucharest (w./Boczová) and Ilawa (w./Ima Bohush), was named as Junior Player of the Year 2008 in Slovakia; she also played at Wimbledon on 25 June 2008, dated Grigor Dimitrov, accompanied him at Championships Dinner at Wimbledon.
- 2009 – finished at No. 678 in WTA singles ranking and at No. 349 in WTA doubles ranking, played first WTA qualifying at tournament in Prague
- 2010 – finished at No. 808 in WTA singles ranking and at No. 619 in WTA doubles ranking, won one ITF singles title in Bournemouth (d. Lisa Whybourn in final) and one ITF doubles title in Antalya (w./Michaela Pochabová). From June 2010 to March 2011, she did not play any tournaments apart from the ITF Espinho event in October 2010 because of a knee injury.
- 2011 – finished at No. 255 in WTA singles rankings and at No. 436 in WTA doubles rankings, won four ITF singles titles in Båstad ($10k, d. Brozda in final) and hat trick in Asunción ($10k, d. Irigoyen in final; $10k, d. Schiechtl in final and $25k, d. Molinero in final), Tabak was runner-up to Scarlett Werner in the ITF tournament at Bournemouth, but lost her WTA singles ranking on 9 May 2011, regaining it on 23 May 2011. 'Player of November' award according to the ITF.
