= Nikola Hofmanova =

Austrian tennis player

- Country (sports): Austria
- Born: 3 February 1991 (age 34); Chomutov, Czechoslovakia
- Height: 1.78 m (5 ft 10 in)
- Prize money: $103,100

Singles
- Career record: 114–114
- Career titles: 3 ITF
- Highest ranking: No. 161 (12 April 2010)

Grand Slam singles results
- Australian Open: Q2 (2010)
- French Open: Q1 (2010)
- Wimbledon: Q2 (2010)
- US Open: Q1 (2009, 2010)

Doubles
- Career record: 40–48
- Career titles: 2 ITF
- Highest ranking: No. 223 (18 July 2011)

Team competitions
- Fed Cup: 1–3

Nikola Hofmanova (born 3 February 1991, as Nikola Hofmanová) is an Austrian former professional tennis player.

Hofmanova was born in Chomutov, Czechoslovakia. She won three singles and two doubles titles on the ITF Circuit in her career. On 12 April 2010, she reached her best singles ranking of world No. 161. On 18 July 2011, she peaked at No. 223 in the doubles rankings.

As a junior, Hofmanova was ranked as high as world No. 4. She won the Orange Bowl Tennis Championships in 2006.

Between 2006 and 2009, she played four rubbers for the Austria Fed Cup team.

In August 2015, Hofmanova played her last match on the pro circuit.

== ITF Circuit finals ==
=== Singles: 8 (3 titles, 5 runner-ups) ===
| Legend $100,000 tournaments $75,000 tournaments $50,000 tournaments $25,000 tournaments $10,000 tournaments | Finals by surface Hard (1–3) Clay (1–0) Grass (0–0) Carpet (1–2) |

| Outcome | No. | Date | Tournament | Surface | Opponent | Score |
|---|---|---|---|---|---|---|
| Winner | 1. | 4 August 2008 | ITF Vienna, Austria | Clay | (Slovakia) Nikola Vajdová | 6–3, 6–1 |
| Runner-up | 1. | 15 September 2008 | ITF Qarshi, Uzbekistan | Hard | (Russia) Elena Kulikova | 6–2, 3–6, 4–6 |
| Winner | 2. | 4 May 2009 | Fukuoka International, Japan | Carpet | (Chinese Taipei) Chang Kai-chen | 6–3, 6–2 |
| Runner-up | 2. | 18 May 2009 | ITF Nagano, Japan | Carpet | (China) Zhang Shuai | 7–5, 2–6, 3–6 |
| Runner-up | 3. | 1 June 2009 | ITF Bukhara, Uzbekistan | Hard | (Russia) Arina Rodionova | 3–6, 2–6 |
| Runner-up | 4. | 3 August 2009 | ITF Astana, Kazakhstan | Hard | (Belarus) Anastasiya Yakimova | 0–6, 4–6 |
| Runner-up | 5. | 3 May 2010 | Fukuoka International, Japan | Carpet | (Japan) Junri Namigata | 1–6, 2–6 |
| Winner | 3. | 2 May 2011 | ITF Bukhara, Uzbekistan | Hard | (Russia) Marta Sirotkina | 6–4, 7–5 |

=== Doubles: 8 (2 titles, 6 runner-ups) ===
| Legend $100,000 tournaments $75,000 tournaments $50,000 tournaments $25,000 tournaments $10,000 tournaments | Finals by surface Hard (1–1) Clay (1–4) Grass (0–0) Carpet (0–1) |

| Outcome | No. | Date | Tournament | Surface | Partner | Opponents | Score |
|---|---|---|---|---|---|---|---|
| Winner | 1. | 21 May 2007 | ITF Vienna, Austria | Clay | (Brazil) Teliana Pereira | (Slovakia) Katarína Poljaková (Slovakia) Zuzana Zlochová | 7–6^{(7–1)}, 6–3 |
| Winner | 2. | 24 March 2008 | ITF Goudi, Greece | Hard | (Italy) Vivienne Vierin | (Italy) Raffaella Bindi (Bulgaria) Biljana Pawlowa-Dimitrova | 5–7, 7–5, [10–7] |
| Runner-up | 1. | 4 August 2008 | ITF Vienna, Austria | Clay | (Romania) Laura-Ioana Andrei | (Slovakia) Ľudmila Cervanová (Slovakia) Katarína Maráčková | 6–0, 3–6, [11–13] |
| Runner-up | 2. | 1 February 2010 | ITF Belfort, France | Carpet (i) | (Russia) Karina Pimkina | (Russia) Elena Bovina (France) Irena Pavlovic | 2–6, 6–2, [6–10] |
| Runner-up | 3. | 8 February 2010 | ITF Stockholm, Sweden | Hard (i) | (Austria) Yvonne Meusburger | (Belarus) Ksenia Milevskaya (Ukraine) Lesia Tsurenko | 4–6, 5–7 |
| Runner-up | 4. | 20 June 2011 | ITF Lenzerheide, Switzerland | Clay | (Slovakia) Romana Tabak | (Croatia) Ani Mijačika (Switzerland) Amra Sadiković | 6–4, 2–6, [4–10] |
| Runner-up | 5. | 20 July 2015 | ITF Bad Waltersdorf, Austria | Clay | (Austria) Janina Toljan | (United States) Natalie Suk (Czech Republic) Anna Vrbenská | 1–6, 5–7 |
| Runner-up | 6. | 10 August 2015 | ITF Innsbruck, Austria | Clay | (Austria) Natasha Bredl | (Bosnia and Herzegovina) Anita Husarić (Russia) Daria Lodikova | 4–6, 6–4, [7–10] |

Sporting positions
| Preceded by (Denmark) Caroline Wozniacki | Orange Bowl Girls' Singles Champion; Category: 18 and under 2006 | Succeeded by (Portugal) Michelle Larcher de Brito |
