= Andrei Karatchenia =

Belarusian tennis player

- Full name: Andrei Karatchenia
- Country (sports): Belarus
- Born: 2 January 1989 (age 36); Minsk, Belarus
- Plays: Right-handed
- Prize money: $18,569

Singles
- Career record: 2–3
- Career titles: 0; 0 Challenger, 0 Futures
- Highest ranking: No. 576 (25 May 2009)

Doubles
- Career record: 0–1
- Career titles: 0; 0 Challenger, 3 Futures
- Highest ranking: No. 560 (26 May 2008)
- Last updated on: 5 August 2021.

Andrei Karatchenia (Belarusian: Андрэй Каратчэня, born 1 January 1989) is a former professional tennis player from Belarus.

== Biography ==
A right-handed player from Minsk, Karatchenia debuted for the Belarus Davis Cup team as a 15 year old in 2004. Belarus had reached the World Group semi-finals for the first time and faced the United States in Charleston. Having already lost the tie, the Belarusians played Karatchenia against Mardy Fish in the last of the reverse singles, but the match was abandoned three games in due to rain.

Karatchenia partnered with Thomas Fabbiano to win the boys' doubles championship at the 2007 French Open, beating Kellen Damico and Jonathan Eysseric in the final. His professional career was limited to Futures tournaments and he won a total of three ITF doubles titles.

In both 2007 and 2008 he appeared in four further Davis Cup ties for Belarus. He had singles wins over Jerzy Janowicz of Poland and Georgia's Irakli Labadze in 2008.

== Junior grand slam finals ==
=== Doubles: 1 (1 title) ===
Outcome	Year	Tournament	Surface	Partnering	Opponents in the final	Score
Win	2007	French Open	Clay	(Italy) Thomas Fabbiano	(United States) Kellen Damico (France) Jonathan Eysseric	6–4, 6–0

== ATP Challenger and ITF Futures finals ==
=== Singles: 1 (0–1) ===
Legend ATP Challenger (0–0) ITF Futures (0–1)	Finals by surface Hard (0–1) Clay (0–0) Grass (0–0) Carpet (0–0)

Result	W–L	Date	Tournament	Tier	Surface	Opponent	Score
Loss	0–1	Jul 2008	Turkey F8, Istanbul	Futures	Hard	(Moldova) Andrei Gorban	5–7, 1–6

=== Doubles: 4 (3–1) ===
Legend ATP Challenger (0–0) ITF Futures (3–1)	Finals by surface Hard (2–1) Clay (1–0) Grass (0–0) Carpet (0–0)

Result	W–L	Date	Tournament	Tier	Surface	Partner	Opponents	Score
Win	1–0	Jul 2007	Italy F24, Modena	Futures	Clay	(Italy) Thomas Fabbiano	(Argentina) J-M Agasarkissian (Argentina) Agustin Picco	6–1, 6–1
Win	2–0	Nov 2007	Great Britain F22, Sunderland	Futures	Hard	(Belarus) Vladimir Voltchkov	(United Kingdom) Neil Bamford (Denmark) Martin Pedersen	2–6, 6–2, [10–8]
Loss	2–1	Nov 2008	Malaysia F1, Kuala Lumpur	Futures	Hard	(Belarus) Sergey Betov	(Monaco) Christopher Rungkat (United States) Nathan Thompson	3–6, 4–6
Win	3–1	Apr 2009	Uzbekistan F1, Andijan	Futures	Hard	(Belarus) Dzmitry Zhyrmont	(Ukraine) Ivan Anikanov (Uzbekistan) Murad Inoyatov	6–7^{(3–7)}, 6–4, [10–4]

== See also ==
- List of Belarus Davis Cup team representatives
