= Patricio Alvarado =

Ecuadorian tennis player (born 1989)

- Country (sports): Ecuador
- Born: 6 October 1989 (age 37) Manta, Ecuador
- Height: 1.75 m (5 ft 9 in)
- Plays: Right-handed (two-handed backhand)
- Prize money: US $26,236

Singles
- Career record: 0–1 (at ATP Tour level, Grand Slam level, and in Davis Cup)
- Career titles: 0
- Highest ranking: No. 872 (8 September 2008)
- Current ranking: No. 1,613 (5 October 2026)

Doubles
- Career record: 0–0 (at ATP Tour level, Grand Slam level, and in Davis Cup)
- Career titles: 1 ITF
- Highest ranking: No. 665 (12 November 2007)
- Current ranking: No. 2,210 (5 October 2026)
- Last updated on: 18 October 2026.

Patricio Alvarado (born 6 October 1989) is an Ecuadorian tennis player. Alvarado has a career high ATP singles ranking of No. 872 achieved on 8 September 2008 and a career high ATP doubles ranking of No. 665 achieved on 12 November 2007.

Alvarado represents Ecuador at the Davis Cup, where he has a W/L record of 0–1.
