= 2007 French Open – Women's doubles =

Women's doubles
- 2007 French Open

Final
- Champion: (Australia) Alicia Molik (Italy) Mara Santangelo
- Runner-up: (Slovenia) Katarina Srebotnik (Japan) Ai Sugiyama
- Score: 7–6^{(7–5)}, 6–3

Details
- Draw: 64 (7 WC )
- Seeds: 16

Events
Singles	men	women		boys	girls
Doubles	men	women	mixed	boys	girls
WC Singles	men	women	quad
WC Doubles	men	women	quad
Legends	−45	45+	women
← 2006 ·	French Open	· 2008 →

Lisa Raymond and Samantha Stosur were the defending champions, but lost in the semifinals to Katarina Srebotnik and Ai Sugiyama.

Alicia Molik and Mara Santangelo won the title, defeating Srebotnik and Sugiyama in the final 7–6^{(7–5)}, 6–3.

== Seeds ==
1. (United States) Lisa Raymond / (Australia) Samantha Stosur (semifinals)
2. (Zimbabwe) Cara Black / (South Africa) Liezel Huber (semifinals)
3. (China) Yan Zi / (China) Zheng Jie (first round)
4. (Czech Republic) Květa Peschke / (Australia) Rennae Stubbs (third round)
5. (Chinese Taipei) Yung-Jan Chan / (Chinese Taipei) Chuang Chia-jung (quarterfinals)
6. (Germany) Anna-Lena Grönefeld / (Argentina) Paola Suárez (first round)
7. (Slovenia) Katarina Srebotnik / (Japan) Ai Sugiyama (final)
8. (Spain) Anabel Medina Garrigues / (Spain) Virginia Ruano Pascual (quarterfinals)
9. (Russia) Elena Likhovtseva / (Russia) Elena Vesnina (first round)
10. (Slovakia) Janette Husárová / (United States) Meghann Shaughnessy (quarterfinals)
11. (Israel) Shahar Pe'er / (Russia) Dinara Safina (third round)
12. (United States) Vania King / (Croatia) Jelena Kostanić Tošić (first round)
13. (Italy) Tathiana Garbin / (United States) Meilen Tu (first round)
14. N/A
15. (Russia) Vera Dushevina / (Ukraine) Tatiana Perebiynis (third round)
16. (Italy) Maria Elena Camerin / (Argentina) Gisela Dulko (quarterfinals)
17. (Australia) Alicia Molik / (Italy) Mara Santangelo (champions)

== Draw ==
=== Key ===
- Q = Qualifier
- WC = Wild card
- LL = Lucky loser
- Alt = Alternate
- ITF = ITF entry
- PR = Protected ranking
- SR = Special ranking
- SE = Special exempt
- JE = Junior exempt
- JR = Junior Accelerator Programme entrant
- CO = College Accelerator Programme entrant
- NG = Next Gen Accelerator Program entrant
- w/o = Walkover
- r = Retired
- d = Defaulted

=== Finals ===
Quarterfinals
1	(United States) Lisa Raymond (Australia) Samantha Stosur	6	6
8	(Spain) Anabel Medina Garrigues (Spain) Virginia Ruano Pascual	1	2
16	(Italy) Maria Elena Camerin (Argentina) Gisela Dulko	6	5	3
7	(Slovenia) Katarina Srebotnik (Japan) Ai Sugiyama	4	7	6
5	(Chinese Taipei) Chan Yung-jan (Chinese Taipei) Chuang Chia-jung	3	6	1
17	(Australia) Alicia Molik (Italy) Mara Santangelo	6	4	6
10	(Slovakia) Janette Husárová (United States) Meghann Shaughnessy	6	1	1
2	(Zimbabwe) Cara Black (South Africa) Liezel Huber	4	6	6

Semifinals
1	(United States) Lisa Raymond (Australia) Samantha Stosur	6	4	3
7	(Slovenia) Katarina Srebotnik (Japan) Ai Sugiyama	1	6	6
17	(Australia) Alicia Molik (Italy) Mara Santangelo	6	3	6
2	(Zimbabwe) Cara Black (South Africa) Liezel Huber	3	6	3

Final
7	(Slovenia) Katarina Srebotnik (Japan) Ai Sugiyama	6^{5}	4
17	(Australia) Alicia Molik (Italy) Mara Santangelo	7^{7}	6

=== Top half ===
==== Section 1 ====
First round
1	(United States) L Raymond (Australia) S Stosur	6	6
(Czech Republic) E Birnerová (India) S Mirza	1	2
(United States) J Craybas (Russia) Y Shvedova	1	4
(Greece) E Daniilidou (Germany) J Wöhr	6	6
(Belarus) V Azarenka (Russia) A Chakvetadze	4	3
(Poland) K Jans (Poland) A Rosolska	6	6
(Hungary) Á Szávay (Czech Republic) V Uhlířová	2	6	6
13	(Italy) T Garbin (United States) M Tu	6	4	1
12	(United States) V King (Croatia) J Kostanić Tošić	2	4
(Switzerland) E Gagliardi (Italy) F Schiavone	6	6
WC	(France) P Parmentier (France) O Sanchez	6	4	3
(Japan) A Nakamura (Thailand) T Tanasugarn	1	6	6
WC	(France) F Haring (France) V Huck	2	0
(China) S Sun (China) T Sun	6	6
(France) N Dechy (France) A Mauresmo	4	6	3
8	(Spain) A Medina Garrigues (Spain) V Ruano Pascual	6	3	6

Second round
1	(United States) L Raymond (Australia) S Stosur	7^{7}	6
(Greece) E Daniilidou (Germany) J Wöhr	6^{4}	0
(Poland) K Jans (Poland) A Rosolska	3	3
(Hungary) Á Szávay (Czech Republic) V Uhlířová	6	6
(Switzerland) E Gagliardi (Italy) F Schiavone	6	6
(Japan) A Nakamura (Thailand) T Tanasugarn	1	2
(China) S Sun (China) T Sun	2	2
8	(Spain) A Medina Garrigues (Spain) V Ruano Pascual	6	6

Third round
1	(United States) L Raymond (Australia) S Stosur	4	6	6
(Hungary) Á Szávay (Czech Republic) V Uhlířová	6	4	1
(Switzerland) E Gagliardi (Italy) F Schiavone	4	4
8	(Spain) A Medina Garrigues (Spain) V Ruano Pascual	6	6

Quarterfinals
1	(United States) L Raymond (Australia) S Stosur	6	6
8	(Spain) Medina Garrigues (Spain) Ruano Pascual	1	2

==== Section 2 ====
First round
4	(Czech Republic) K Peschke (Australia) R Stubbs	6	6
WC	(France) J Coin (France) V Pichet	2	1
(Austria) T Paszek (Czech Republic) B Záhlavová-Strýcová	4	2
(South Africa) N Grandin (United States) L Granville	6	6
(Germany) M Müller (Czech Republic) G Navrátilová	6	5	7
(United States) A Harkleroad (Ukraine) M Koryttseva	3	7	5
(United States) C Morariu (Switzerland) P Schnyder	4	6	5
16	(Italy) ME Camerin (Argentina) G Dulko	6	3	7
11	(Israel) S Pe'er (Russia) D Safina	7^{7}	7^{8}
(Italy) F Pennetta (Italy) R Vinci	6^{3}	6^{6}
(Serbia) A Ivanovic (Russia) M Kirilenko	1	2
(Serbia) J Janković (China) N Li	6	6
(France) S Foretz (France) C Pin	7^{7}	6
WC	(France) A Cornet (France) Y Fedossova	6^{5}	2
WC	(Czech Republic) L Hradecká (Czech Republic) R Voráčová	7^{7}	5	2
7	(Slovenia) K Srebotnik (Japan) A Sugiyama	6^{3}	7	6

Second round
4	(Czech Republic) K Peschke (Australia) R Stubbs	6	7
(South Africa) N Grandin (United States) L Granville	1	6
(Germany) M Müller (Czech Republic) G Navrátilová	1	1
16	(Italy) ME Camerin (Argentina) G Dulko	6	6
11	(Israel) S Pe'er (Russia) D Safina	6	6
(Serbia) J Janković (China) N Li	3	2
(France) S Foretz (France) C Pin	1	3
7	(Slovenia) K Srebotnik (Japan) A Sugiyama	6	6

Third round
4	(Czech Republic) K Peschke (Australia) R Stubbs	6	4	3
16	(Italy) ME Camerin (Argentina) G Dulko	1	6	6
11	(Israel) S Pe'er (Russia) D Safina	1	2
7	(Slovenia) K Srebotnik (Japan) A Sugiyama	6	6

Quarterfinals
16	(Italy) ME Camerin (Argentina) G Dulko	6	5	3
7	(Slovenia) K Srebotnik (Japan) A Sugiyama	4	7	6

=== Bottom half ===
==== Section 3 ====
First round
5	(Chinese Taipei) Y-j Chan (Chinese Taipei) C-j Chuang	6	6
(Czech Republic) I Benešová (Russia) G Voskoboeva	1	2
(Russia) E Bychkova (Israel) T Obziler	6^{6}	1
(Spain) L Domínguez Lino (Spain) A Parra Santonja	7	6
WC	(France) M Johansson (Tunisia) S Sfar	2	6	6
(France) A Rezaï (Ukraine) J Vakulenko	6	1	4
(Slovakia) J Gajdošová (Japan) A Morigami	6	2	6
9	(Russia) E Likhovtseva (Russia) E Vesnina	3	6	3
17	(Australia) A Molik (Italy) M Santangelo	6	6
(Italy) A Brianti (Italy) K Knapp	0	2
(United States) B Mattek (Australia) B Stewart	6^{3}	1
(Romania) A Ehritt-Vanc (Russia) An Rodionova	7^{7}	6
(France) S Brémond (France) S Cohen-Aloro	5	2
(Chinese Taipei) S-w Hsieh (United States) S Perry	7	6
(Spain) N Llagostera Vives (Spain) MJ Martínez Sánchez	6	6
3	(China) Z Yan (China) J Zheng	4	4

Second round
5	(Chinese Taipei) Y-j Chan (Chinese Taipei) C-j Chuang	2	6	6
(Spain) L Domínguez Lino (Spain) A Parra Santonja	6	1	1
(France) M Johansson (Tunisia) S Sfar	0	5
(Slovakia) J Gajdošová (Japan) A Morigami	6	7
17	(Australia) A Molik (Italy) M Santangelo	6	4	6
(Romania) A Ehritt-Vanc (Russia) An Rodionova	2	6	4
(Chinese Taipei) S-w Hsieh (United States) S Perry	6^{1}	3
(Spain) N Llagostera Vives (Spain) MJ Martínez Sánchez	7^{7}	6

Third round
5	(Chinese Taipei) Y-j Chan (Chinese Taipei) C-j Chuang	6	7
(Slovakia) J Gajdošová (Japan) A Morigami	3	5
17	(Australia) A Molik (Italy) M Santangelo	6	6
(Spain) N Llagostera Vives (Spain) MJ Martínez Sánchez	3	4

Quarterfinals
5	(Chinese Taipei) Y-j Chan (Chinese Taipei) C-j Chuang	3	6	1
17	(Australia) A Molik (Italy) M Santangelo	6	4	6

==== Section 4 ====
First round
6	(Germany) A-L Grönefeld (Argentina) P Suárez	2	0
(Netherlands) M Krajicek (Poland) A Radwańska	6	6
(Germany) S Kloesel (France) V Razzano	1	1
(Russia) A Kudryavtseva (Finland) E Laine	6	6
(Czech Republic) P Cetkovská (Czech Republic) L Šafářová	6	2	6^{6}
(Ukraine) A Bondarenko (Ukraine) K Bondarenko	2	6	7^{8}
(Austria) S Bammer (Germany) J Schruff	2	3
10	(Slovakia) J Husárová (United States) M Shaughnessy	6	6
15	(Russia) V Dushevina (Ukraine) T Perebiynis	6	0
(France) M Bartoli (Venezuela) M Sequera	4	0^{r}
WC	(France) S Lefèvre (France) A Védy	6	6
(Ukraine) Y Fedak (Estonia) K Kanepi	4	4
(Russia) O Puchkova (Canada) A Wozniak	6	4	4
(Russia) V Bardina (Belarus) T Poutchek	3	6	6
(France) É Loit (Australia) N Pratt	3	4
2	(Zimbabwe) C Black (South Africa) L Huber	6	6

Second round
(Netherlands) M Krajicek (Poland) A Radwańska	6	6
(Russia) A Kudryavtseva (Finland) E Laine	4	1
(Ukraine) A Bondarenko (Ukraine) K Bondarenko	1	3
10	(Slovakia) J Husárová (United States) M Shaughnessy	6	6
15	(Russia) V Dushevina (Ukraine) T Perebiynis	6	7^{8}
(France) S Lefèvre (France) A Védy	1	6^{6}
(Russia) V Bardina (Belarus) T Poutchek	6^{4}	1
2	(Zimbabwe) C Black (South Africa) L Huber	7^{7}	6

Third round
(Netherlands) M Krajicek (Poland) A Radwańska	1	4
10	(Slovakia) J Husárová (United States) M Shaughnessy	6	6
15	(Russia) V Dushevina (Ukraine) T Perebiynis	5	3
2	(Zimbabwe) C Black (South Africa) L Huber	7	6

Quarterfinals
10	(Slovakia) J Husárová (United States) M Shaughnessy	6	1	1
2	(Zimbabwe) C Black (South Africa) L Huber	4	6	6
