= 2007 French Open – Mixed doubles =

Mixed doubles
- 2007 French Open

Final
- Champion: (France) Nathalie Dechy (Israel) Andy Ram
- Runner-up: (Slovenia) Katarina Srebotnik (Serbia) Nenad Zimonjić
- Score: 7–5, 6–3

Details
- Draw: 32
- Seeds: 8

Events
Singles	men	women		boys	girls
Doubles	men	women	mixed	boys	girls
WC Singles	men	women	quad
WC Doubles	men	women	quad
Legends	−45	45+	women
- French Open

The 2007 French Open mixed doubles tennis tournament was held in Paris from 27 May through to 10 June 2007. The defending champions were Katarina Srebotnik and Nenad Zimonjić, but they lost to Nathalie Dechy and Andy Ram in the finals.

This was the first French Open to replace the final advantage set for a super tie-break in the mixed doubles category.

== Seeds ==
1. (United States) Lisa Raymond / (United States) Bob Bryan (quarterfinals)
2. (South Africa) Liezel Huber / (Zimbabwe) Kevin Ullyett (quarterfinals)
3. (Italy) Francesca Schiavone / (Sweden) Jonas Björkman^{1}
4. (Czech Republic) Květa Peschke / (Czech Republic) Martin Damm (first round)
5. (China) Zi Yan / (The Bahamas) Mark Knowles (semifinals)
6. (Slovenia) Katarina Srebotnik / (Serbia) Nenad Zimonjić (final)
7. (Chinese Taipei) Yung-Jan Chan / (United States) Mike Bryan (first round)
8. (France) Nathalie Dechy / (Israel) Andy Ram (champions)

^{1.}Francesca Schiavone / Jonas Björkman did not take part, Anastasia Rodionova / Jordan Kerr took their place

== Draw ==
Key

- Q = Qualifier
- WC = Wild card
- LL = Lucky loser
- Alt = Alternate
- ITF = ITF entry
- PR = Protected ranking
- SR = Special ranking
- SE = Special exempt
- JE = Junior exempt
- JR = Junior Accelerator Programme entrant
- CO = College Accelerator Programme entrant
- NG = Next Gen Accelerator Program entrant
- w/o = Walkover
- r = Retired
- d = Defaulted

=== Finals ===
Quarterfinals
1	(United States) Bob Bryan (United States) Lisa Raymond	4	6^{6}
6	(Slovenia) Katarina Srebotnik (Serbia) Nenad Zimonjić	6	7
(Chinese Taipei) Chuang Chia-jung (Australia) Todd Perry	4	6^{4}
5	(China) Yan Zi (The Bahamas) Mark Knowles	6	7^{7}
(United States) Meghann Shaughnessy (India) Leander Paes	6	4	[7]
(China) Sun Tiantian (Austria) Julian Knowle	4	6	[10]
8	(France) Nathalie Dechy (Israel) Andy Ram	7^{7}	6
2	(South Africa) Liezel Huber (Zimbabwe) Kevin Ullyett	6^{5}	2

Semifinals
6	(Slovenia) Katarina Srebotnik (Serbia) Nenad Zimonjić	6	6
5	(China) Yan Zi (The Bahamas) Mark Knowles	3	4
(China) Sun Tiantian (Austria) Julian Knowle	2	4
8	(France) Nathalie Dechy (Israel) Andy Ram	6	6

Final
6	(Slovenia) Katarina Srebotnik (Serbia) Nenad Zimonjić	5	3
8	(France) Nathalie Dechy (Israel) Andy Ram	7	6

=== Top half ===
==== Section 1 ====
First round
1	(United States) L Raymond (United States) B Bryan	6	7
(Denmark) C Wozniacki (France) G Monfils	0	5
(Italy) M Santangelo (Sweden) S Aspelin	6	6^{5}	[11]
(Greece) E Daniilidou (Austria) J Melzer	3	7	[9]
(India) S Mirza (France) F Santoro	6	6
(United States) V King (Czech Republic) F Čermák	2	0
(Russia) E Likhovtseva (Canada) D Nestor	2	7	[7]
6	(Slovenia) K Srebotnik (Serbia) N Zimonjić	6	5	[10]

Second round
1	(United States) L Raymond (United States) B Bryan	3	6	[10]
(Italy) M Santangelo (Sweden) S Aspelin	6	3	[5]
(India) S Mirza (France) F Santoro	2	6^{1}
6	(Slovenia) K Srebotnik (Serbia) N Zimonjić	6	7

Quarterfinals
1	(United States) B Bryan (United States) L Raymond	4	6^{6}
6	(Slovenia) K Srebotnik (Serbia) N Zimonjić	6	7

==== Section 2 ====
First round
4	(Czech Republic) K Peschke (Czech Republic) M Damm	2	4
(Chinese Taipei) Chuang C-J (Australia) T Perry	6	6
(France) S Brémond (France) M Gicquel	6	5	[10]
(France) É Loit (France) A Sidorenko	4	7	[7]
(Italy) T Garbin (Australia) P Hanley	7^{7}	6
(Argentina) P Suárez (India) M Bhupathi	6^{4}	3
(Australia) R Stubbs (Australia) A Fisher	2	1
5	(China) Yan Z (The Bahamas) M Knowles	6	6

Second round
(Chinese Taipei) Chuang C-J (Australia) T Perry	4	6	[10]
(France) S Brémond (France) M Gicquel	6	2	[7]
(Italy) T Garbin (Australia) P Hanley	6^{5}	3
5	(China) Yan Z (The Bahamas) M Knowles	7^{7}	6

Quarterfinals
(Chinese Taipei) Chuang C-J (Australia) T Perry	4	6^{4}
5	(China) Yan Z (The Bahamas) M Knowles	6	7

=== Bottom half ===
==== Section 3 ====
First round
7	(Chinese Taipei) Chan Y-J (United States) M Bryan	2	0
(United States) M Shaughnessy (India) L Paes	6	6
(Austria) S Bammer (Poland) M Matkowski	6^{5}	6	[10]
(France) C Pin (France) M Llodra	7^{7}	1	[5]
(China) Sun T (Austria) J Knowle	1
(Belarus) V Azarenka (Belarus) M Mirnyi	2^{r}
(France) A Cornet (France) J Eysseric	1	6	[10]
Alt	(Russia) A Rodionova (Australia) J Kerr	6	4	[4]

Second round
(United States) M Shaughnessy (India) L Paes	6	0	[10]
(Austria) S Bammer (Poland) M Matkowski	2	6	[8]
(China) Sun T (Austria) J Knowle	6	6
(France) A Cornet (France) J Eysseric	1	1

Quarterfinals
(United States) M Shaughnessy (India) L Paes	6	4	[7]
(China) Sun T (Austria) J Knowle	4	6	[10]

==== Section 4 ====
First round
8	(France) N Dechy (Israel) A Ram	7^{10}	6
(Zimbabwe) C Black (South Africa) J Coetzee	6^{8}	1
(Slovakia) J Husárová (Czech Republic) P Vízner	5	6	[10]
(Spain) V Ruano Pascual (Argentina) M García	7	2	[8]
(France) A Védy (France) F Serra	6	2	[11]
(Russia) E Vesnina (Israel) J Erlich	3	6	[9]
(Japan) A Sugiyama (United States) J Thomas	1	3
2	(South Africa) L Huber (Zimbabwe) K Ullyett	6	6

Second round
8	(France) N Dechy (Israel) A Ram	4	6	[10]
(Slovakia) J Husárová (Czech Republic) P Vízner	6	3	[8]
(France) A Védy (France) F Serra	2	6^{4}
2	(South Africa) L Huber (Zimbabwe) K Ullyett	6	7^{7}

Quarterfinals
8	(France) N Dechy (Israel) A Ram	7^{7}	6
2	(South Africa) L Huber (Zimbabwe) K Ullyett	6^{5}	2

== See also ==
- List of tennis tournaments
