= 2007 French Open – Men's doubles =

Men's doubles
- 2007 French Open

Final
- Champion: (The Bahamas) Mark Knowles (Canada) Daniel Nestor
- Runner-up: (Czech Republic) Lukáš Dlouhý (Czech Republic) Pavel Vízner
- Score: 2–6, 6–3, 6–4

Details
- Draw: 64
- Seeds: 16

Events
Singles	men	women		boys	girls
Doubles	men	women	mixed	boys	girls
WC Singles	men	women	quad
WC Doubles	men	women	quad
Legends	−45	45+	women
- French Open

The defending French Open men's doubles champions were Jonas Björkman and Max Mirnyi; however, they lost in the quarterfinals against Mahesh Bhupathi and Radek Štěpánek. Mark Knowles and Daniel Nestor won the title, defeating ninth seeds Lukáš Dlouhý and Pavel Vízner in the final.

This French Open saw the introduction of a final set tie-break in this category.

== Seeds ==
1. (United States) Bob Bryan / (United States) Mike Bryan (quarterfinals)
2. (Sweden) Jonas Björkman / (Belarus) Max Mirnyi (quarterfinals)
3. (Czech Republic) Martin Damm / (India) Leander Paes (second round)
4. (France) Fabrice Santoro / (Serbia) Nenad Zimonjić (semifinals)
5. (Australia) Paul Hanley / (Zimbabwe) Kevin Ullyett (second round)
6. (The Bahamas) Mark Knowles / (Canada) Daniel Nestor (champions)
7. (Israel) Jonathan Erlich / (Israel) Andy Ram (third round)
8. (Sweden) Simon Aspelin / (Austria) Julian Knowle (third round)
9. (Czech Republic) Lukáš Dlouhý / (Czech Republic) Pavel Vízner (final)
10. (France) Michaël Llodra / (France) Arnaud Clément (third round)
11. (Romania) Andrei Pavel / (Germany) Alexander Waske (third round)
12. (Poland) Mariusz Fyrstenberg / (Poland) Marcin Matkowski (first round)
13. (Switzerland) Yves Allegro / (United States) Jim Thomas (second round)
14. (Australia) Ashley Fisher / (United States) Tripp Phillips (first round)
15. (Australia) Todd Perry / (South Africa) Wesley Moodie (first round)
16. (Argentina) Martín García / (Argentina) Sebastián Prieto (second round)

== Draw ==
Key

- Q = Qualifier
- WC = Wild card
- LL = Lucky loser
- Alt = Alternate
- ITF = ITF entry
- PR = Protected ranking
- SR = Special ranking
- SE = Special exempt
- JE = Junior exempt
- JR = Junior Accelerator Programme entrant
- CO = College Accelerator Programme entrant
- NG = Next Gen Accelerator Program entrant
- w/o = Walkover
- r = Retired
- d = Defaulted

=== Finals ===
Quarterfinals
1	(United States) Bob Bryan (United States) Mike Bryan	7	4	4
9	(Czech Republic) Lukáš Dlouhý (Czech Republic) Pavel Vízner	5	6	6
4	(France) Fabrice Santoro (Serbia) Nenad Zimonjić	6	7
(Russia) Igor Kunitsyn (Russia) Dmitry Tursunov	4	5
6	(The Bahamas) Mark Knowles (Canada) Daniel Nestor	6	6
(Germany) Michael Kohlmann (Germany) Rainer Schüttler	4	4
(India) Mahesh Bhupathi (Czech Republic) Radek Štěpánek	3	6	7^{8}
2	(Sweden) Jonas Björkman (Belarus) Max Mirnyi	6	1	6^{6}

Semifinals
9	(Czech Republic) Lukáš Dlouhý (Czech Republic) Pavel Vízner	6	1	6
4	(France) Fabrice Santoro (Serbia) Nenad Zimonjić	1	6	4
6	(The Bahamas) Mark Knowles (Canada) Daniel Nestor	6	6
(India) Mahesh Bhupathi (Czech Republic) Radek Štěpánek	3	4

Final
9	(Czech Republic) Lukáš Dlouhý (Czech Republic) Pavel Vízner	6	3	4
6	(The Bahamas) Mark Knowles (Canada) Daniel Nestor	2	6	6

=== Top half ===
==== Section 1 ====
First round
1	(United States) B Bryan (United States) M Bryan	6	6
(Denmark) Pless (United States) Spadea	2	1
(Italy) Bracciali (Croatia) Ljubičić	2	5
(France) Monfils (France) Ouanna	6	7
(France) Carraz (France) Montcourt	2	2
(Poland) Kubot (Austria) Marach	6	6
(United States) Querrey (United States) Russell	6	4	3
16	(Argentina) García (Argentina) Prieto	4	6	6
9	(Czech Republic) Dlouhý (Czech Republic) Vízner	6	6
(France) Ascione (France) Roger-Vasselin	1	2
(United States) Butorac (United Kingdom) J. Murray	6^{8}	3
(Czech Republic) Cibulec (Australia) Kerr	7^{10}	6
(Sweden) T. Johansson (Finland) Nieminen	3	7^{7}	3
(Argentina) Roitman (Netherlands) Verkerk	6	6^{3}	6
(Slovakia) Hrbatý (Czech Republic) Levinský	0	3
8	(Sweden) Aspelin (Austria) Knowle	6	6

Second round
1	(United States) B Bryan (United States) M Bryan	6	6
(France) Monfils (France) Ouanna	0	3
(Poland) Kubot (Austria) Marach	6	6^{1}	7^{8}
16	(Argentina) García (Argentina) Prieto	4	7^{7}	6^{6}
9	(Czech Republic) Dlouhý (Czech Republic) Vízner	6	7^{7}
(Czech Republic) Cibulec (Australia) Kerr	3	6^{5}
(Argentina) Roitman (Netherlands) Verkerk	3	0
8	(Sweden) Aspelin (Austria) Knowle	6	6

Third round
1	(United States) B Bryan (United States) M Bryan	4	6	6
(Poland) Kubot (Austria) Marach	6	3	4
9	(Czech Republic) Dlouhý (Czech Republic) Vízner	6	6
8	(Sweden) Aspelin (Austria) Knowle	2	4

Quarterfinals
1	(United States) B Bryan (United States) M Bryan	7	4	4
9	(Czech Republic) Dlouhý (Czech Republic) Vízner	5	6	6

==== Section 2 ====
First round
4	(France) Santoro (Serbia) Zimonjić	6	6
(Germany) Becker (Germany) Mayer	0	3
(France) Haehnel (France) Sidorenko	1	4
(Spain) Granollers Pujol (Spain) López	6	6
(Czech Republic) Suk (Czech Republic) Vik	3	4
(Belgium) O. Rochus (Belgium) Vliegen	6	6
(Germany) Kohlschreiber (Austria) Koubek	3	1
13	(Switzerland) Allegro (United States) Thomas	6	6
10	(France) Llodra (France) Clément	6	6
(France) Simon (Switzerland) Wawrinka	3	0
(Slovakia) Mertiňák (Czech Republic) Pála	6	6
(United States) Delić (United States) Parrot	4	4
(Russia) Kunitsyn (Russia) Tursunov	6	4	6
(United Kingdom) Auckland (Australia) Huss	1	6	2
(France) Gicquel (France) Serra	3	7^{8}	3
5	(Australia) Hanley (Zimbabwe) Ullyett	6	6^{6}	6

Second round
4	(France) Santoro (Serbia) Zimonjić	7	1	6
(Spain) Granollers Pujol (Spain) López	5	6	4
(Belgium) O. Rochus (Belgium) Vliegen	6	6
13	(Switzerland) Allegro (United States) Thomas	4	4
10	(France) Llodra (France) Clément	4	6	6
(Slovakia) Mertiňák (Czech Republic) Pála	6	1	4
(Russia) Kunitsyn (Russia) Tursunov	7^{7}	6
5	(Australia) Hanley (Zimbabwe) Ullyett	6^{4}	4

Third round
4	(France) Santoro (Serbia) Zimonjić	5	6	6
(Belgium) O. Rochus (Belgium) Vliegen	7	3	2
10	(France) Llodra (France) Clément	3	7	4
(Russia) Kunitsyn (Russia) Tursunov	6	5	6

Quarterfinals
4	(France) Santoro (Serbia) Zimonjić	6	7
(Russia) Kunitsyn (Russia) Tursunov	4	5

=== Bottom half ===
==== Section 3 ====
First round
6	(The Bahamas) Knowles (Canada) Nestor	6	6
(Germany) Behrend (Germany) Kas	4	3
(France) Oger (France) Tourte	7	6
(Russia) Andreev (Peru) Horna	5	4
(United States) Ginepri (United States) Lipsky	6	4	1
(South Africa) Haggard (South Korea) Lee	1	6	6
(Austria) Peya (Germany) Phau	5	3
11	(Romania) Pavel (Germany) Waske	7	6
14	(Australia) Fisher (United States) Phillips	5	3
(Czech Republic) Friedl (Czech Republic) Škoch	7	6
(Argentina) Mónaco (Argentina) Zabaleta	6^{3}	4
(Argentina) Berlocq (Uruguay) Cuevas	7^{7}	6
(Germany) Kohlmann (Germany) Schüttler	6	6
(Chile) Massú (Russia) Gabashvili	3	4
(France) Chardy (France) Eysseric	6^{4}	6^{2}
3	(Czech Republic) Damm (India) Paes	7^{7}	7^{7}

Second round
6	(The Bahamas) Knowles (Canada) Nestor	6	7^{8}
(France) Oger (France) Tourte	1	6^{6}
(South Africa) Haggard (South Korea) Lee	1	1
11	(Romania) Pavel (Germany) Waske	6	6
(Czech Republic) Friedl (Czech Republic) Škoch	3	2
(Argentina) Berlocq (Uruguay) Cuevas	6	6
(Germany) Kohlmann (Germany) Schüttler	6	1	6
3	(Czech Republic) Damm (India) Paes	3	6	3

Third round
6	(The Bahamas) Knowles (Canada) Nestor	6	6
11	(Romania) Pavel (Germany) Waske	3	4
(Argentina) Berlocq (Uruguay) Cuevas	4	3
(Germany) Kohlmann (Germany) Schüttler	6	6

Quarterfinals
6	(The Bahamas) Knowles (Canada) Nestor	6	6
(Germany) Kohlmann (Germany) Schüttler	4	4

==== Section 4 ====
First round
7	(Israel) Erlich (Israel) Ram	5	6	6
(France) Grosjean (France) Saulnier	7	4	2
(United States) Gimelstob (United States) Kendrick	7^{7}	2	4
(Brazil) Melo (Brazil) Sá	6^{2}	6	6
(Italy) Starace (Argentina) Vassallo Argüello	3	2
(Spain) García López (Italy) Volandri	6	6
(India) Bhupathi (Czech Republic) Štěpánek	6	6
12	(Poland) Fyrstenberg (Poland) Matkowski	4	0
15	(South Africa) Moodie (Australia) Perry	7	3	6^{6}
(France) Benneteau (France) Mahut	5	6	7
(South Africa) Coetzee (Netherlands) Wassen	6	7^{8}
(Spain) Montañés (Spain) Ramírez Hidalgo	4	6^{6}
(Australia) Arthurs (Spain) Verdasco	6	6
(Czech Republic) Čermák (Czech Republic) Hájek	4	0
(Italy) Bolelli (Argentina) del Potro	4	3
2	(Sweden) Björkman (Belarus) Mirnyi	6	6

Second round
7	(Israel) Erlich (Israel) Ram	6	6
(Brazil) Melo (Brazil) Sá	1	2
(Spain) García López (Italy) Volandri	1	3
(India) Bhupathi (Czech Republic) Štěpánek	6	6
(France) Benneteau (France) Mahut	4	5
(South Africa) Coetzee (Netherlands) Wassen	6	7
(Australia) Arthurs (Spain) Verdasco	1	2
2	(Sweden) Björkman (Belarus) Mirnyi	6	6

Third round
7	(Israel) Erlich (Israel) Ram	6^{4}	4
(India) Bhupathi (Czech Republic) Štěpánek	7^{7}	6
(South Africa) Coetzee (Netherlands) Wassen	4	3
2	(Sweden) Björkman (Belarus) Mirnyi	6	6

Quarterfinals
(India) Bhupathi (Czech Republic) Štěpánek	3	6	7^{8}
2	(Sweden) Björkman (Belarus) Mirnyi	6	1	6^{6}
