= Lenka Juríková =

Slovak tennis player

- Country (sports): Slovakia
- Born: 11 August 1990 (age 34); Bratislava, Czechoslovakia
- Height: 1.74 m (5 ft 9 in)
- Plays: Right (two-handed backhand)
- Prize money: $135,135

Singles
- Career record: 341–200
- Career titles: 11 ITF
- Highest ranking: No. 196 (2 May 2011)

Grand Slam singles results
- French Open: Q1 (2011)
- Wimbledon: Q1 (2011)
- US Open: Q2 (2011)

Doubles
- Career record: 88–77
- Career titles: 5 ITF
- Highest ranking: No. 326 (21 March 2011)

Lenka Juríková (Slovak pronunciation: [ˈleŋka ˈjuriːkɔʋaː]; born 11 August 1990) is a Slovak former tennis player.

Juríková won eleven singles titles and five doubles titles on the ITF Women's Circuit. On 2 May 2011, she reached her career-high singles ranking of world No. 196. On 21 March 2011, she peaked at No. 326 in the doubles rankings.

== ITF finals ==
=== Singles (11–8) ===
Legend $25,000 tournaments $10/15,000 tournaments	Finals by surface Hard (2–1) Clay (9–7) Carpet (0–0)

Result	No.	Date	Tournament	Surface	Opponent	Score
Win	1.	15 March 2008	Ramat HaSharon, Israel	Hard	(Greece) Eirini Georgatou	6–4, 6–3
Win	2.	23 March 2008	Porto Rafti, Greece	Hard	(Czech Republic) Jana Jandová	6–1, 7–6^{(7–5)}
Loss	1.	27 April 2008	Hvar, Croatia	Clay	(Austria) Patricia Mayr	4–6, 2–6
Win	3.	17 May 2009	Michalovce, Slovakia	Clay	(Slovakia) Michaela Pochabová	6–4, 2–6, 7–5
Loss	2.	21 March 2010	Bath, England	Hard (i)	(Poland) Katarzyna Piter	2–6, 6–7^{(6–8)}
Win	4.	20 June 2010	Bratislava, Slovakia	Clay	(Italy) Camila Giorgi	6–2, 6–1
Win	5.	1 August 2010	Bad Saulgau, Germany	Clay	(Netherlands) Elise Tamaëla	6–4, 6–2
Loss	3.	15 August 2010	Trnava, Slovakia	Clay	(Czech Republic) Sandra Záhlavová	6–2, 3–6, 1–6
Loss	4.	28 October 2012	Dubrovnik, Croatia	Clay	(Romania) Laura-Ioana Andrei	6–3, 4–6, 2–6
Loss	5.	17 March 2013	Antalya, Turkey	Clay	(Romania) Cristina Dinu	4–6, 6–7^{(5–7)}
Loss	6.	29 September 2013	Prague, Czech Republic	Clay	(Russia) Ekaterina Alexandrova	3–6, 6–3, 2–6
Loss	7.	22 June 2014	Přerov, Czech Republic	Clay	(Czech Republic) Barbora Krejčíková	3–6, 4–6
Win	6.	13 September 2015	Prague, Czech Republic	Clay	(Philippines) Katharina Lehnert	6–3, 6–4
Win	7.	18 June 2016	Přerov, Czech Republic	Clay	(Ukraine) Anastasia Zarytska	6–2, 6–4
Win	8.	21 August 2016	Slovenská Ľupča, Slovakia	Clay	(Czech Republic) Tereza Procházková	6–1, 6–2
Win	9.	28 August 2016	Pörtschach, Austria	Clay	(Czech Republic) Miriam Kolodziejová	6–1, 6–2
Win	10.	3 September 2016	Sankt Pölten, Austria	Clay	(Slovakia) Kristína Schmiedlová	6–2, 6–4
Loss	8.	9 April 2017	Tučepi, Croatia	Clay	(Croatia) Lea Bošković	3–6, 6–1, 1–6
Win	11.	17 June 2017	Přerov, Czech Republic	Clay	(Czech Republic) Miriam Kolodziejová	6–4, 6–4

=== Doubles (5–9) ===
Legend $25,000 tournaments $10/15,000 tournaments	Finals by surface Hard (0–4) Clay (5–5) Carpet (0–0)

Result	No.	Date	Tournament	Surface	Partner	Opponents	Score
Loss	1.	26 April 2008	ITF Hvar, Croatia	Clay	(Slovakia) Monika Kochanová	(Austria) Patricia Mayr (Italy) Vivienne Vierin	4–6, 6–7^{(2–7)}
Win	1.	10 May 2008	ITF Michalovce, Slovakia	Clay	(Poland) Katarzyna Piter	(Slovakia) Romana Tabak (Slovakia) Nikola Vajdová	6–1, 6–1
Loss	2.	16 March 2012	GB Pro-Series Bath, UK	Hard (i)	(Poland) Katarzyna Piter	(United Kingdom) Samantha Murray (United Kingdom) Emily Webley-Smith	6–4, 4–6, [5–10]
Loss	3.	30 June 2012	ITF Stuttgart, Germany	Hard (i)	(Slovakia) Zuzana Luknárová	(Austria) Sandra Klemenschits (Germany) Tatjana Malek	3–6, 2–6
Win	2.	5 October 2012	ITF Solin, Croatia	Clay	(Slovakia) Chantal Škamlová	(Czech Republic) Denisa Allertová (Belgium) Michaela Boev	7–5, 6–4
Loss	4.	2 March 2013	ITF Antalya, Turkey	Clay	(Slovakia) Chantal Škamlová	(Italy) Gioia Barbieri (Germany) Anne Schäfer	6–4, 3–6, [4–10]
Win	3.	19 October 2013	ITF Dubrovnik, Croatia	Clay	(Czech Republic) Barbora Krejčíková	(Czech Republic) Gabriela Pantůčková (Slovenia) Polona Reberšak	7–5, 3–6, [10–4]
Loss	5.	25 October 2013	ITF Dubrovnik, Croatia	Clay	(Czech Republic) Barbora Krejčíková	(Hungary) Ágnes Bukta (Slovakia) Vivien Juhászová	3–6, 3–6
Loss	6.	15 March 2014	ITF Antalya, Turkey	Clay	(Austria) Janina Toljan	(Japan) Mana Ayukawa (France) Estelle Cascino	5–7, 5–7
Loss	7.	13 February 2015	ITF Trnava, Slovakia	Hard (i)	(Slovakia) Michaela Hončová	(Austria) Anna Maria Heil (Latvia) Anastasija Sevastova	4–6, 3–6
Loss	8.	13 March 2015	ITF Antalya, Turkey	Clay	(Germany) Kim Grajdek	(Sweden) Cornelia Lister (Belarus) Sviatlana Pirazhenka	6–7^{(6–8)}, 4–6
Loss	9.	13 February 2016	ITF Trnava, Slovakia	Hard (i)	(Czech Republic) Tereza Malíková	(Hungary) Réka Luca Jani (Slovakia) Chantal Škamlová	3–6, 6–2, [7–10]
Win	4.	15 June 2018	ITF Přerov, Czech Republic	Clay	(Slovakia) Jana Jablonovská	(Czech Republic) Karolína Kubáňová (Czech Republic) Laetitia Pulchartová	2–6, 6–1, [10–6]
Win	5.	20 July 2018	ITF Vienna, Austria	Clay	(Slovakia) Jana Jablonovská	(Czech Republic) Sabina Machalová (Czech Republic) Veronika Vlkovská	1–6, 6–3, [10–4]
