= 2008 Dutch Open Tennis – Doubles =

Doubles
- 2008 Dutch Open

Final
- Champions: (Czech Republic) František Čermák (Netherlands) Rogier Wassen
- Runners-up: (Netherlands) Jesse Huta Galung (Netherlands) Igor Sijsling
- Score: 7–5, 7–5

Details
- Draw: 16

Events
Singles	Doubles
← 2007 ·	Dutch Open	· 2019 →

Juan Pablo Brzezicki and Juan Pablo Guzmán were the defending champions, but chose not to participate that year.

František Čermák and Rogier Wassen won in the final 7–5, 7–5, against Jesse Huta Galung and Igor Sijsling.

== Seeds ==
1. (Czech Republic) František Čermák / (Netherlands) Rogier Wassen (champions)
2. (Uruguay) Pablo Cuevas / (Spain) Marcel Granollers (semifinals)
3. (Spain) Albert Montañés / (Spain) Santiago Ventura (quarterfinals, withdrew due to a wrist injury for Ventura)
4. (Argentina) Mariano Hood / (Argentina) Sebastián Prieto (first round)

== Draw ==
=== Key ===
- Q = Qualifier
- WC = Wild card
- LL = Lucky loser
- Alt = Alternate
- SE = Special exempt
- PR = Protected ranking
- ITF = ITF entry
- JE = Junior exempt
- w/o = Walkover
- r = Retired
- d = Defaulted
- SR = Special ranking

=== Draw ===
First round
1	(Czech Republic) F Čermák (Netherlands) R Wassen	6	6
(El Salvador) R Arevalo (Netherlands) B Beks	2	4
(France) N Tourte (Slovakia) I Zelenay	6	6^{6}	[5]
(Poland) T Bednarek (Spain) Ó Hernández	3	7^{8}	[10]
4	(Argentina) M Hood (Argentina) S Prieto	6	0	[8]
(Spain) A Martín (Kazakhstan) Y Schukin	3	6	[10]
(Italy) F Colangelo (Germany) P Marx	6^{4}	4
(Argentina) J Acasuso (Spain) D Marrero	7^{7}	6
WC	(Netherlands) J Huta Galung (Netherlands) I Sijsling	7^{7}	6
(Belgium) S Darcis (Belgium) C Rochus	6^{4}	3
(Spain) I Navarro (Germany) P Petzschner	4	3
3	(Spain) A Montañés (Spain) S Ventura	6	6
(Russia) T Gabashvili (Russia) D Matsukevitch	6	6
ALT	(Netherlands) T Schoorel (Netherlands) H Troost	2	4
(Netherlands) J Smit (Netherlands Antilles) M van Haasteren	6^{9}	3
2	(Uruguay) P Cuevas (Spain) M Granollers	7^{11}	6

Quarterfinals
1	(Czech Republic) F Čermák (Netherlands) R Wassen	6	7^{7}
(Poland) T Bednarek (Spain) Ó Hernández	4	6^{3}
(Spain) A Martín (Kazakhstan) Y Schukin	7^{7}	1	[7]
(Argentina) J Acasuso (Spain) D Marrero	6^{1}	6	[10]
WC	(Netherlands) J Huta Galung (Netherlands) I Sijsling	w/o
3	(Spain) A Montañés (Spain) S Ventura
(Russia) T Gabashvili (Russia) D Matsukevitch	2	4
2	(Uruguay) P Cuevas (Spain) M Granollers	6	6

Semifinals
1	(Czech Republic) F Čermák (Netherlands) R Wassen	3	6	[10]
(Argentina) J Acasuso (Spain) D Marrero	6	1	[8]
WC	(Netherlands) J Huta Galung (Netherlands) I Sijsling	6	6
2	(Uruguay) P Cuevas (Spain) M Granollers	3	3

Final
1	(Czech Republic) F Čermák (Netherlands) R Wassen	7	7
WC	(Netherlands) J Huta Galung (Netherlands) I Sijsling	5	5
