= 2007 Dutch Open Tennis – Doubles =

Doubles
- 2007 Dutch Open

Final
- Champions: (Argentina) Juan Pablo Brzezicki (Argentina) Juan Pablo Guzmán
- Runners-up: (Netherlands) Robin Haase (Netherlands) Rogier Wassen
- Score: 6–2, 6–0

Events
Singles	Doubles
← 2006 ·	Dutch Open	· 2008 →

Alberto Martín and Fernando Vicente were the defending champions, but did not participate this year.

Juan Pablo Brzezicki and Juan Pablo Guzmán won in the final 6–2, 6–0, against Robin Haase and Rogier Wassen.

== Seeds ==
1. (Sweden) Robert Lindstedt / (Belgium) Kristof Vliegen (first round)
2. (Germany) Tomas Behrend / (Germany) Christopher Kas (first round)
3. (Spain) Albert Montañés / (Spain) Rubén Ramírez Hidalgo (quarterfinals)
4. (Uruguay) Pablo Cuevas / (Argentina) Sergio Roitman (first round)

== Draw ==
=== Key ===
- Q = Qualifier
- WC = Wild card
- LL = Lucky loser
- Alt = Alternate
- SE = Special exempt
- PR = Protected ranking
- ITF = ITF entry
- JE = Junior exempt
- w/o = Walkover
- r = Retired
- d = Defaulted
- SR = Special ranking

=== Draw ===
First round
1	(Sweden) R Lindstedt (Belgium) K Vliegen	6^{6}	4
(Romania) V Hănescu (Switzerland) J-C Scherrer	7^{8}	6
(Argentina) JP Brzezicki (Argentina) JP Guzmán	6	5	[10]
(Austria) W Eschauer (Croatia) L Zovko	4	7	[7]
3	(Spain) A Montañés (Spain) R Ramírez Hidalgo	7^{8}	4	[10]
(Poland) T Bednarek (Netherlands Antilles) J-J Rojer	6^{6}	6	[7]
(Germany) F Moser (Germany) B Phau	1	1
(Slovakia) D Hrbatý (Slovakia) M Mertiňák	6	6
(Argentina) M González (Peru) L Horna	3	7^{10}	[8]
(Argentina) A Calleri (Chile) N Massú	6	6^{8}	[10]
WC	(Netherlands) T de Bakker (Netherlands) R Sluiter	7	7
4	(Uruguay) P Cuevas (Argentina) S Roitman	5	5
(Netherlands) R Haase (Netherlands) R Wassen	3	6	[10]
(France) N Devilder (France) G Simon	6	3	[6]
WC	(Netherlands) J Smit (Netherlands) M van Haasteren	6	3	[10]
2	(Germany) T Behrend (Germany) C Kas	3	6	[7]

Quarterfinals
(Romania) V Hănescu (Switzerland) J-C Scherrer	7^{7}	1	[7]
(Argentina) JP Brzezicki (Argentina) JP Guzmán	6^{3}	6	[10]
3	(Spain) A Montañés (Spain) R Ramírez Hidalgo	4	1
(Slovakia) D Hrbatý (Slovakia) M Mertiňák	6	6
(Argentina) A Calleri (Chile) N Massú	6	6
WC	(Netherlands) T de Bakker (Netherlands) R Sluiter	1	3
(Netherlands) R Haase (Netherlands) R Wassen	6	6
WC	(Netherlands) J Smit (Netherlands) M van Haasteren	3	2

Semifinals
(Argentina) JP Brzezicki (Argentina) JP Guzmán	6	6
(Slovakia) D Hrbatý (Slovakia) M Mertiňák	3	4
(Argentina) A Calleri (Chile) N Massú	w/o
(Netherlands) R Haase (Netherlands) R Wassen

Final
(Argentina) JP Brzezicki (Argentina) JP Guzmán	6	6
(Netherlands) R Haase (Netherlands) R Wassen	2	0
