= 2008 Dutch Open Tennis – Singles =

Singles
- 2008 Dutch Open

Final
- Champion: (Spain) Albert Montañés
- Runner-up: (Belgium) Steve Darcis
- Score: 1–6, 7–5, 6–3

Details
- Draw: 28 (4Q / 3WC)
- Seeds: 8

Events
Singles	Doubles
← 2007 ·	Dutch Open	· 2019 →

Steve Darcis was the defending champion, but Albert Montañés defeated him 1–6, 7–5, 6–3, in the final.

== Seeds ==
The top four seeds receive a bye into the second round.

1. (France) Marc Gicquel (semifinals)
2. (Argentina) José Acasuso (quarterfinals)
3. (Belgium) Steve Darcis (final)
4. (Spain) Marcel Granollers (quarterfinals)
5. (Spain) Albert Montañés (champion)
6. (France) Florent Serra (first round)
7. (Argentina) Martín Vassallo Argüello (second round)
8. (Spain) Santiago Ventura (first round)

== Draw ==
=== Key ===
- Q = Qualifier
- WC = Wild card
- LL = Lucky loser
- Alt = Alternate
- SE = Special exempt
- PR = Protected ranking
- ITF = ITF entry
- JE = Junior exempt
- w/o = Walkover
- r = Retired
- d = Defaulted
- SR = Special ranking

=== Finals ===
Semifinals
1	(France) Marc Gicquel	6^{3}	6	5
3	(Belgium) Steve Darcis	7^{7}	3	7
(Spain) Óscar Hernández	1	3
5	(Spain) Albert Montañés	6	6

Final
3	(Belgium) Steve Darcis	6	5	3
5	(Spain) Albert Montañés	1	7	6

=== Top half ===
First round
(Romania) A Cruciat	5	4
WC	(Netherlands) T de Bakker	7	6
(France) T Ascione	2	6^{1}
(Russia) T Gabashvili	6	7^{7}
Q	(Italy) A Brizzi	4	3
7	(Argentina) M Vassallo Argüello	6	6
(Kazakhstan) Y Schukin	6^{6}	4
(Spain) A Martín	7^{8}	6
(Belgium) C Rochus	7	6
Q	(Spain) D Marrero	5	2
(Germany) P Petzschner	2	6	6
6	(France) F Serra	6	4	4

Second round
1	(France) M Gicquel	7^{8}	6
WC	(Netherlands) T de Bakker	6^{6}	3
(Russia) T Gabashvili	6	6
7	(Argentina) M Vassallo Argüello	4	0
3	(Belgium) S Darcis	6	7^{7}
(Spain) A Martín	1	6^{5}
(Belgium) C Rochus	6	6
(Germany) P Petzschner	3	4

Quarterfinals
1	(France) M Gicquel	6	6
(Russia) T Gabashvili	4	1
3	(Belgium) S Darcis	7	6
(Belgium) C Rochus	5	3

Semifinals
1	(France) M Gicquel	6^{3}	6	5
3	(Belgium) S Darcis	7^{7}	3	7

=== Bottom half ===
First round
8	(Spain) S Ventura	1	0^{r}
WC	(Netherlands) J Huta Galung	6	1
Q	(Russia) D Matsukevitch	1	3
(Spain) Ó Hernández	6	6
Q	(Netherlands) I Sijsling	3	1
(Spain) I Navarro	6	6
5	(Spain) A Montañés	6	6
(Belgium) K Vliegen	4	2
(Austria) W Eschauer	5	2
(Uruguay) P Cuevas	7	6
WC	(Netherlands) M Verkerk	6	6^{9}	3^{r}
(France) É Roger-Vasselin	2	7^{11}	4

Second round
WC	(Netherlands) J Huta Galung	3	3
(Spain) Ó Hernández	6	6
(Spain) I Navarro	4	4
4	(Spain) M Granollers	6	6
5	(Spain) A Montañés	6	6
(Uruguay) P Cuevas	4	4
(France) É Roger-Vasselin	3	4
2	(Argentina) J Acasuso	6	6

Quarterfinals
(Spain) Ó Hernández	7	6
4	(Spain) M Granollers	5	2
5	(Spain) A Montañés	6	6
2	(Argentina) J Acasuso	0	2

Semifinals
(Spain) Ó Hernández	1	3
5	(Spain) A Montañés	6	6
