= 2007 Dutch Open Tennis =

- Date: 16–23 July
- Edition: 50th
- Category: International Series
- Draw: 32S / 16D
- Prize money: €353,450
- Surface: Clay / outdoor
- Location: Amersfoort, Netherlands

Champions

Singles
- (Belgium) Steve Darcis

Doubles
- (Argentina) Juan Pablo Brzezicki / (Argentina) Juan Pablo Guzmán
- Dutch Open

The 2007 Dutch Open Tennis Amersfoort was the 50th edition of the Dutch Open tennis tournament and was played on outdoor clay courts. The tournament was held from 16 July until 23 July 2007 in Amersfoort, the Netherlands and was part of the International series of the 2007 ATP Tour.

Steve Darcis won his first career title, as a qualifier ranked 297th.

== Finals ==
=== Singles ===
(Belgium) Steve Darcis defeated (Austria) Werner Eschauer, 6–1, 7–6^{(7–1)}

- It was Darcis' only singles title of the year and the first of his career.

=== Doubles ===
(Argentina) Juan Pablo Brzezicki / (Argentina) Juan Pablo Guzmán defeated (Netherlands) Robin Haase / (Netherlands) Rogier Wassen, 6–2, 6–0
