= 2006 Dutch Open – Singles =

Singles
- 2006 Dutch Open

Final
- Champion: (Serbia) Novak Djokovic
- Runner-up: (Chile) Nicolás Massú
- Score: 7–6^{(7–5)}, 6–4

Details
- Draw: 32
- Seeds: 8

Events
Singles	Doubles
← 2005 ·	Dutch Open	· 2007 →

Fernando González was the defending champion, but did not participate this year.

Novak Djokovic won the tournament (his first career title), beating Nicolás Massú in the final, 7–6^{(7–5)}, 6–4.

== Seeds ==
1. (Argentina) Guillermo Coria (semifinals, retired due to a right shoulder injury)
2. (France) Paul-Henri Mathieu (second round)
3. (Serbia) Novak Djokovic (champion)
4. (Chile) Nicolás Massú (final)
5. (Spain) Carlos Moyá (quarterfinals)
6. (Spain) Alberto Martín (quarterfinals)
7. (Italy) Daniele Bracciali (second round)
8. (France) Julien Benneteau (first round)

== Draw ==
=== Key ===
- Q = Qualifier
- WC = Wild card
- LL = Lucky loser
- Alt = Alternate
- SE = Special exempt
- PR = Protected ranking
- ITF = ITF entry
- JE = Junior exempt
- w/o = Walkover
- r = Retired
- d = Defaulted
- SR = Special ranking

=== Finals ===
Semifinals
1	(Argentina) Guillermo Coria	2	0^{r}
3	(Serbia) Novak Djokovic	6	1
4	(Chile) Nicolás Massú	6	6
(Spain) Rubén Ramírez Hidalgo	1	3

Final
3	(Serbia) Novak Djokovic	7^{7}	6
4	(Chile) Nicolás Massú	6^{5}	4

=== Top half ===
First round
1	(Argentina) G Coria	6	4	6
WC	(Netherlands) R Haase	3	6	4
(Argentina) S Roitman	6	6
SE	(Croatia) M Čilić	3	1
(Germany) D Gremelmayr	2	6^{5}
(Argentina) A Calleri	6	7^{7}
WC	(Netherlands) I Sijsling	7^{7}	4	2
7	(Italy) D Bracciali	6^{5}	6	6
3	(Serbia) N Djokovic	6	6
(Serbia) B Pašanski	0	3
Q	(Belgium) S Darcis	5	3
(Czech Republic) T Zíb	7	6
(France) M Gicquel	6	6
(Spain) F Vicente	2	4
WC	(Netherlands) T de Bakker	6	6
8	(France) J Benneteau	3	3

Second round
1	(Argentina) G Coria	7	4	6
(Argentina) S Roitman	5	6	2
(Argentina) A Calleri	1	7^{7}	6
7	(Italy) D Bracciali	6	6^{2}	0
3	(Serbia) N Djokovic	6	6
(Czech Republic) T Zíb	4	2
(France) M Gicquel	4	6	6
WC	(Netherlands) T de Bakker	6	3	2

Quarterfinals
1	(Argentina) G Coria	6	7^{7}
(Argentina) A Calleri	3	6^{4}
3	(Serbia) N Djokovic	6	6
(France) M Gicquel	3	4

Semifinals
1	(Argentina) G Coria	2	0^{r}
3	(Serbia) N Djokovic	6	1

=== Bottom half ===
First round
5	(Spain) C Moyá	6	7^{8}
(Spain) G García-López	4	6^{6}
Q	(Italy) F Fognini	6	1	7
Q	(Argentina) JP Guzmán	3	6	5
(Costa Rica) JA Marín	6	7
(Italy) D Sanguinetti	2	5
Q	(Sweden) A Vinciguerra	6^{3}	3
4	(Chile) N Massú	7^{7}	6
6	(Spain) A Martín	6	6
(Spain) A Montañés	2	2
(Czech Republic) I Minář	4	3
(Argentina) E Massa	6	6
(Argentina) C Berlocq	7^{7}	3	3
(Spain) R Ramírez Hidalgo	6^{4}	6	6
(Italy) A di Mauro	0	3
2	(France) P-H Mathieu	6	6

Second round
5	(Spain) C Moyá	7	6
Q	(Italy) F Fognini	5	3
(Costa Rica) JA Marín	4	6^{2}
4	(Chile) N Massú	6	7^{7}
6	(Spain) A Martín	6	6
(Argentina) E Massa	2	4
(Spain) R Ramírez Hidalgo	6	6
2	(France) P-H Mathieu	4	2

Quarterfinals
5	(Spain) C Moyá	5	4
4	(Chile) N Massú	7	6
6	(Spain) A Martín	2	2
(Spain) R Ramírez Hidalgo	6	6

Semifinals
4	(Chile) N Massú	6	6
(Spain) R Ramírez Hidalgo	1	3
