= 2008 Dutch Open Tennis =

- Date: 14–20 July
- Edition: 51st
- Category: International Series
- Draw: 32S / 16D
- Prize money: €305,000
- Surface: Clay / outdoor
- Location: Amersfoort, Netherlands

Champions

Singles
- (Spain) Albert Montañés

Doubles
- (Czech Republic) František Čermák / (Netherlands) Rogier Wassen
← 2007 ·	Dutch Open	· 2019 →

The 2008 Dutch Open (also known as the Priority Telecom Open for sponsorship reasons) was a tennis tournament played on outdoor clay courts. It was the 51st and last edition of the Dutch Open, and was part of the International Series of the 2008 ATP Tour. It took place at the Sportlokaal de Bokkeduinen in Amersfoort, Netherlands, from 14 July through 20 July 2008.

The singles field was led by 's-Hertogenbosch runner-up Marc Gicquel, Acapulco semifinalist and Buenos Aires finalist José Acasuso, and Memphis winner and Amersfoort defending champion Steve Darcis. Other seeded players were Houston titlist Marcel Granollers, Hamburg Masters quarterfinalist and recent Stuttgart quarterfinalist Albert Montañés, Florent Serra, Martín Vassallo Argüello and Santiago Ventura.

Fifth-seeded Albert Montañés won the singles title.

== Finals ==
=== Singles ===
(Spain) Albert Montañés defeated (Belgium) Steve Darcis 1–6, 7–5, 6–3

- It was Montañés' only singles title of the year and the 1st of his career.

=== Doubles ===
(Czech Republic) František Čermák / (Netherlands) Rogier Wassen defeated (Netherlands) Jesse Huta Galung / (Netherlands) Igor Sijsling 7–5, 7–5
