= 2006 Dutch Open =

2006 Dutch Open may refer to:

- 2006 Dutch Open (badminton)
- 2006 Dutch Open (tennis)
