= 2001 Majorca Open =

Tennis tournament

- Date: 30 April – 6 May
- Edition: 7th
- Category: International Series
- Draw: 32S / 16D
- Prize money: $475,000
- Surface: Clay / outdoor
- Location: Mallorca, Spain

Champions

Singles
- (Spain) Alberto Martín

Doubles
- (United States) Donald Johnson / (United States) Jared Palmer
- Majorca Open

The 2001 Majorca Open was a men's tennis tournament played on outdoor clay courts in Mallorca, Spain and was part of the International Series of the 2001 ATP Tour. It was the seventh edition of the tournament and ran from April 30 through May 6, 2001. Unseeded Alberto Martín won the singles title.

== Finals ==
=== Singles ===
(Spain) Alberto Martín defeated (Argentina) Guillermo Coria 6–3, 3–6, 6–2

- It was Martin's only title of the year and the 4th of his career.

=== Doubles ===
(United States) Donald Johnson / (United States) Jared Palmer defeated (Spain) Feliciano López / (Spain) Francisco Roig 7–5, 6–3

- It was Johnson's 4th title of the year and the 18th of his career. It was Palmer's 3rd title of the year and the 20th of his career.
