= 2001 Majorca Open – Singles =

Singles
- 2001 Majorca Open

Final
- Champion: (Spain) Alberto Martín
- Runner-up: (Argentina) Guillermo Coria
- Score: 6–3, 3–6, 6–2

Details
- Draw: 32
- Seeds: 8

Events
Singles	Doubles
- Majorca Open

The 2001 Majorca Open singles was a professional tennis competition. Marat Safin was the defending champion but did not compete that year. Alberto Martín won in the final 6–3, 3–6, 6–2 against Guillermo Coria.

== Seeds ==
A champion seed is indicated in bold text while text in italics indicates the round in which that seed was eliminated.

1. (Romania) Andrei Pavel (first round)
2. (Germany) Tommy Haas (first round)
3. (Spain) Carlos Moyá (semifinals)
4. (Argentina) Guillermo Coria (final)
5. (Spain) Francisco Clavet (first round)
6. (Germany) Nicolas Kiefer (quarterfinals)
7. (Spain) Fernando Vicente (second round)
8. (Spain) Albert Portas (first round)

== Draw ==
Key

- Q = Qualifier
- WC = Wild card
- LL = Lucky loser
- Alt = Alternate
- ITF = ITF entry
- PR = Protected ranking
- SR = Special ranking
- SE = Special exempt
- JE = Junior exempt
- JR = Junior Accelerator Programme entrant
- CO = College Accelerator Programme entrant
- NG = Next Gen Accelerator Program entrant
- w/o = Walkover
- r = Retired
- d = Defaulted

First round
1	(Romania) A Pavel	4	**7^{7}**	5
WC	(Spain) **F Mantilla**	**6**	6^{2}	**7**
(Argentina) M Zabaleta	4	6^{4}
(Spain) **J Balcells**	**6**	**7^{7}**
(Russia) M Youzhny	2	**6**	3
WC	(France) **M Llodra**	**6**	4	**6**
(Argentina) **A Calleri**	**6**	**7^{7}**
5	(Spain) F Clavet	2	6^{5}
4	(Argentina) **G Coria**	**6**	**6**
Q	(Netherlands) R Wassen	4	1
Q	(Spain) A Montañés	0	2
(Spain) **T Robredo**	**6**	**6**
WC	(Spain) F López	**7^{7}**	5	4
(Germany) **J Knippschild**	6^{5}	**7**	**6**
Q	(Costa Rica) **J A Marín**	**6**	**6**
8	(Spain) A Portas	1	2
6	(Germany) **N Kiefer**	**6**	**6**
(Slovakia) K Kučera	4	2
(Switzerland) **M Kratochvil**	**6**	6^{0}	**6**
(Spain) Á Calatrava	4	**7^{7}**	2
(Spain) **S Bruguera**	4
Q	(Czech Republic) F Čermák	3^{r}
(Argentina) M Puerta	3	0^{r}
3	(Spain) **C Moyá**	**6**	1
7	(Spain) **F Vicente**	**6**	4	**6**
(Israel) H Levy	3	**6**	2
(Spain) G Puentes	5	5
(Czech Republic) **C Doseděl**	**7**	**7**
(Chile) N Massú	**6**	3	6^{3}
(Spain) **A Martín**	4	**6**	**7^{7}**
(Spain) **G Blanco**	**6**	**7^{7}**
2	(Germany) T Haas	3	6^{4}

Second round
WC	(Spain) F Mantilla	4	2
(Spain) **J Balcells**	**6**	**6**
WC	(France) M Llodra	3	1
(Argentina) **A Calleri**	**6**	**6**
4	(Argentina) **G Coria**	**6**	**7**
(Spain) T Robredo	0	5
(Germany) J Knippschild	4	**6**	4
(Costa Rica) **J A Marín**	**6**	1	**6**
6	(Germany) **N Kiefer**	**6**	**6**
(Switzerland) M Kratochvil	1	4
(Spain) S Bruguera	4	**6**	3
3	(Spain) **C Moyá**	**6**	4	**6**
7	(Spain) F Vicente	3	**6**	1
(Czech Republic) **C Doseděl**	**6**	0	**6**
(Spain) **A Martín**	**6**	4	**6**
(Spain) G Blanco	0	**6**	2

Quarterfinals
(Spain) **J Balcells**	**7^{7}**	**6**
(Argentina) A Calleri	6^{5}	4
4	(Argentina) **G Coria**	3	**7^{7}**	**6**
(Costa Rica) J A Marín	**6**	6^{2}	1
6	(Germany) N Kiefer	4	2
3	(Spain) **C Moyá**	**6**	**6**
(Czech Republic) C Doseděl	2	4
(Spain) **A Martín**	**6**	**6**

Semifinals
(Spain) J Balcells	**6**	3	5
4	(Argentina) **G Coria**	4	**6**	**7**
3	(Spain) C Moyá	3	3
(Spain) **A Martín**	**6**	**6**

Final
4	(Argentina) Guillermo Coria	3	**6**	2
(Spain) **Alberto Martín**	**6**	3	**6**

== See also ==
- Association of Tennis Professionals
- History of tennis
