= 2006 Dutch Open – Doubles =

Doubles
- 2006 Dutch Open

Final
- Champions: (Spain) Alberto Martín (Spain) Fernando Vicente
- Runners-up: (Argentina) Lucas Arnold Ker (Germany) Christopher Kas
- Score: 6–4, 6–3

Events
Singles	Doubles
← 2005 ·	Dutch Open	· 2007 →

Martín García and Luis Horna were the defending champions, but did not participate this year.

Alberto Martín and Fernando Vicente won in the final 6–4, 6–3, against Lucas Arnold Ker and Christopher Kas.

== Seeds ==
1. (Czech Republic) David Škoch / (Netherlands) Rogier Wassen (semifinals)
2. (Argentina) Lucas Arnold Ker / (Germany) Christopher Kas (final)
3. (Argentina) Agustín Calleri / (Chile) Nicolás Massú (quarterfinals)
4. (Spain) Alberto Martín / (Spain) Fernando Vicente (champions)

== Draw ==
=== Key ===
- Q = Qualifier
- WC = Wild card
- LL = Lucky loser
- Alt = Alternate
- SE = Special exempt
- PR = Protected ranking
- ITF = ITF entry
- JE = Junior exempt
- w/o = Walkover
- r = Retired
- d = Defaulted
- SR = Special ranking

=== Draw ===
First round
1	(Czech Republic) D Škoch (Netherlands) R Wassen	6	4	[10]
(Czech Republic) B Ulihrach (Czech Republic) T Zíb	1	6	[3]
WC	(Netherlands) R Haase (Netherlands) I Sijsling	7	3	[5]
(Spain) G García-López (Italy) D Sanguinetti	5	6	[10]
4	(Spain) A Martín (Spain) F Vicente	6	7
(Italy) D Bracciali (Germany) D Gremelmayr	3	5
(Spain) R Ramírez Hidalgo (Argentina) S Roitman	6	6
(Italy) A di Mauro (Italy) A Motti	4	1
(Argentina) C Berlocq (Argentina) M Vassallo Argüello	7	6
(Czech Republic) T Cibulec (Czech Republic) I Minář	5	2
(Serbia) N Djokovic (Serbia) B Pašanski	4	6	[9]
3	(Argentina) A Calleri (Chile) N Massú	6	0	[11]
WC	(Netherlands) T de Bakker (Netherlands) A van der Duim	3	6	[4]
(Costa Rica) JA Marín (Argentina) E Massa	6	2	[10]
(France) M Gicquel (France) O Patience	3	0
2	(Argentina) L Arnold Ker (Germany) C Kas	6	6

Quarterfinals
1	(Czech Republic) D Škoch (Netherlands) R Wassen	6	6
(Spain) G García-López (Italy) D Sanguinetti	2	4
4	(Spain) A Martín (Spain) F Vicente	4	6	[10]
(Spain) R Ramírez Hidalgo (Argentina) S Roitman	6	3	[4]
(Argentina) C Berlocq (Argentina) M Vassallo Argüello	6	6
3	(Argentina) A Calleri (Chile) N Massú	2	3
(Costa Rica) JA Marín (Argentina) E Massa	5	6	[7]
2	(Argentina) L Arnold Ker (Germany) C Kas	7	4	[10]

Semifinals
1	(Czech Republic) D Škoch (Netherlands) R Wassen	5	6^{4}
4	(Spain) A Martín (Spain) F Vicente	7	7^{7}
(Argentina) C Berlocq (Argentina) M Vassallo Argüello	4	3
2	(Argentina) L Arnold Ker (Germany) C Kas	6	6

Final
4	(Spain) A Martín (Spain) F Vicente	6	6
2	(Argentina) L Arnold Ker (Germany) C Kas	4	3
