= 2006 Dutch Open (tennis) =

- Date: 17–23 July
- Edition: 49th
- Category: International Series
- Draw: 32S / 16D
- Prize money: €323,250
- Surface: Clay / outdoor
- Location: Amersfoort, Netherlands

Champions

Singles
- (Serbia) Novak Djokovic

Doubles
- (Spain) Alberto Martín / (Spain) Fernando Vicente
- Dutch Open

The 2006 Dutch Open was an ATP men's tennis tournament played on outdoor clay courts in Amersfoort, Netherlands. It was the 49th edition of the tournament that was part of the International Series of the 2006 ATP Tour. It was held from 17 July until 23 July 2006. Third-seeded Novak Djokovic won his first event of the year, and the first title of his professional career.

== Finals ==
=== Singles ===
(Serbia) Novak Djokovic defeated (Chile) Nicolás Massú 7–6^{(7–5)}, 6–4

=== Doubles ===
(Spain) Alberto Martín / (Spain) Fernando Vicente defeated (Argentina) Lucas Arnold / (Germany) Christopher Kas 6–4, 6–3
