= 2007 Dutch Open Tennis – Singles =

Singles
- 2007 Dutch Open

Final
- Champion: (Belgium) Steve Darcis
- Runner-up: (Austria) Werner Eschauer
- Score: 6–1, 7–6^{(7–1)}

Details
- Draw: 32
- Seeds: 8

Events
Singles	Doubles
← 2006 ·	Dutch Open	· 2008 →

Steve Darcis defeated Werner Eschauer 6–1, 7–6^{(7–1)} to win the 2007 Dutch Open (tennis) singles event.

== Seeds ==
1. (Russia) Nikolay Davydenko (first round)
2. (Russia) Mikhail Youzhny (semifinals)
3. (Spain) Carlos Moyá (quarterfinals)
4. (Italy) Filippo Volandri (second round)
5. (Argentina) Agustín Calleri (first round)
6. (Slovakia) Dominik Hrbatý (first round)
7. (Spain) Nicolás Almagro (first round)
8. (France) Marc Gicquel (first round)

== Draw ==
=== Key ===
- Q = Qualifier
- WC = Wild card
- LL = Lucky loser
- Alt = Alternate
- SE = Special exempt
- PR = Protected ranking
- ITF = ITF entry
- JE = Junior exempt
- w/o = Walkover
- r = Retired
- d = Defaulted
- SR = Special ranking

=== Finals ===
Semifinals
WC	(Netherlands) Robin Haase	4	4
(Austria) Werner Eschauer	6	6
Q	(Belgium) Steve Darcis	4	6	7
2	(Russia) Mikhail Youzhny	6	0	5

Final
(Austria) Werner Eschauer	1	6^{1}
Q	(Belgium) Steve Darcis	6	7^{7}

=== Section 1 ===
First round
1	(Russia) N Davydenko	6	1	1
WC	(France) F Serra	4	6	6
(Chile) N Massú	6^{7}	6^{5}
WC	(Netherlands) T de Bakker	7^{9}	7^{7}
Q	(Spain) F Mantilla	3	2
WC	(Netherlands) R Haase	6	6
(France) N Devilder	6	6
5	(Argentina) A Calleri	3	1
3	(Spain) C Moyá	6	6
Q	(Belgium) C Rochus	2	3
(Argentina) M Zabaleta	6	6
(Belgium) K Vliegen	3	3
WC	(Netherlands) R Sluiter	3	7	6
(Peru) L Horna	6	5	3
(Austria) W Eschauer	7^{7}	6
7	(Spain) N Almagro	6^{1}	4

Second round
(France) F Serra	4	6	7^{7}
WC	(Netherlands) T de Bakker	6	3	6^{5}
WC	(Netherlands) R Haase	6	3	6
(France) N Devilder	4	6	3
3	(Spain) C Moyá	6	6
(Argentina) M Zabaleta	2	3
WC	(Netherlands) R Sluiter	2	4
(Austria) W Eschauer	6	6

Quarterfinals
(France) F Serra	6	5	4
WC	(Netherlands) R Haase	4	7	6
3	(Spain) C Moyá	7^{7}	4	4
(Austria) W Eschauer	6^{4}	6	6

Semifinals
WC	(Netherlands) R Haase	4	4
(Austria) W Eschauer	6	6

=== Section 2 ===
First round
8	(France) M Gicquel	3	4
Q	(Belgium) S Darcis	6	6
(France) G Simon	6	6
(Spain) R Ramírez	2	4
SE	(Russia) I Andreev	6	6
(Serbia) J Tipsarević	1	1
(Spain) Ó Hernández	2	4
4	(Italy) F Volandri	6	6
6	(Slovakia) D Hrbatý	3	7^{7}	3
(Russia) E Korolev	6	6^{3}	6
(Argentina) S Roitman	7^{7}	6
Q	(France) J Chardy	6^{5}	1
(Spain) Montañés	6^{3}	6	6^{4}
(Romania) V Hănescu	7^{7}	4	7^{7}
(Argentina) M Vassallo	2	5
2	(Russia) M Youzhny	6	7

Second round
Q	(Belgium) S Darcis	7^{7}	6
(France) G Simon	6^{4}	1
SE	(Russia) I Andreev	3	6	6
4	(Italy) F Volandri	6	1	4
(Russia) E Korolev	7	7^{8}
(Argentina) S Roitman	5	6^{6}
(Romania) V Hănescu	4	2
2	(Russia) M Youzhny	6	6

Quarterfinals
Q	(Belgium) S Darcis	6	6
SE	(Russia) I Andreev	3	4
(Russia) E Korolev	4	3
2	(Russia) M Youzhny	6	6

Semifinals
Q	(Belgium) S Darcis	4	6	7
2	(Russia) M Youzhny	6	0	5
