= 2001 Majorca Open – Doubles =

Doubles
- 2001 Majorca Open

Final
- Champions: (United States) Donald Johnson (United States) Jared Palmer
- Runners-up: (Spain) Feliciano López (Spain) Francisco Roig
- Score: 7–5, 6–3

Details
- Draw: 16
- Seeds: 4

Events
| Singles | Doubles |
| ← 2000 · | Majorca Open | · 2002 → |

Michaël Llodra and Diego Nargiso were the defending champions but only Llodra competed that year with Eyal Ran.

Llodra and Ran lost in the quarterfinals to Feliciano López and Francisco Roig.

Donald Johnson and Jared Palmer won in the final 7–5, 6–3 against López and Roig.

== Seeds ==
Champion seeds are indicated in bold text while text in italics indicates the round in which those seeds were eliminated.

1. (United States) **Donald Johnson** / (United States) **Jared Palmer (champions)**
2. (The Bahamas) Mark Knowles / (United States) Jeff Tarango (semifinals)
3. (Australia) Michael Hill / (United States) Scott Humphries (first round)
4. (Zimbabwe) Wayne Black / (Zimbabwe) Kevin Ullyett (semifinals)

== Draw ==
=== Key ===
- Q = Qualifier
- WC = Wild card
- LL = Lucky loser
- Alt = Alternate
- ITF = ITF entry
- PR = Protected ranking
- SR = Special ranking
- SE = Special exempt
- JE = Junior exempt
- JR = Junior Accelerator Programme entrant
- CO = College Accelerator Programme entrant
- NG = Next Gen Accelerator Program entrant
- w/o = Walkover
- r = Retired
- d = Defaulted

First round
1 | (United States) **D Johnson** (United States) **J Palmer** | **7^{7}** | **7^{7}**
(Argentina) P Albano (Spain) Á López Morón | 6^{4} | 6^{5}
(Argentina) **L Arnold** (Germany) **M-K Goellner** | 4 | **6** | **6**
WC | (Germany) N Kiefer (Romania) A Pavel | **6** | 3 | 2
4 | (Zimbabwe) **W Black** (Zimbabwe) **K Ullyett** | **7^{8}** | 5 | **6**
(Spain) J Balcells (Spain) T Carbonell | 6^{6} | **7** | 1
WC | (Spain) G Blanco (Spain) F Vicente | 4 | **6** | 5
(Sweden) **S Aspelin** (Sweden) **J Landsberg** | **6** | 2 | **7**
(France) **M Llodra** (Israel) **E Ran** | **6** | **6**
(Germany) K Braasch (Germany) J Knippschild | 3 | 4
Q | (Spain) **F López** (Spain) **F Roig** | **7^{7}** | **7^{17}**
3 | (Australia) M Hill (United States) S Humphries | 6^{3} | 6^{15}
(Argentina) M Hood (Argentina) S Prieto | 4 | 2
(Spain) **A Portas** (Spain) **G Puentes** | **6** | **6**
WC | (Spain) R Carretero (Spain) J Velasco Jr. | 3 | **6** | 2
2 | (The Bahamas) **M Knowles** (United States) **J Tarango** | **6** | 4 | **6**

Quarterfinals
1 | (United States) **D Johnson** (United States) **J Palmer** | 2 | **7** | **6**
(Argentina) L Arnold (Germany) M-K Goellner | **6** | 5 | 4
4 | (Zimbabwe) **W Black** (Zimbabwe) **K Ullyett** | **7^{8}** | 4 | **6**
(Sweden) S Aspelin (Sweden) J Landsberg | 6^{6} | **6** | 3
(France) M Llodra (Israel) E Ran | 2 | 6^{5}
Q | (Spain) **F López** (Spain) **F Roig** | **6** | **7^{7}**
(Spain) A Portas (Spain) G Puentes | 4 | 5
2 | (The Bahamas) **M Knowles** (United States) **J Tarango** | **6** | **7**

Semifinals
1 | (United States) **D Johnson** (United States) **J Palmer** | 6^{8} | **7^{7}** | **6**
4 | (Zimbabwe) W Black (Zimbabwe) K Ullyett | **7^{10}** | 6^{3} | 1
Q | (Spain) **F López** (Spain) **F Roig** | 6^{4} | **7** | **7**
2 | (The Bahamas) M Knowles (United States) J Tarango | **7^{7}** | 5 | 5

Final
1 | (United States) **D Johnson** (United States) **J Palmer** | **7** | **6**
Q | (Spain) F López (Spain) F Roig | 5 | 3
