= 2000 Majorca Open – Doubles =

Doubles
- 2000 Majorca Open

Final
- Champions: (France) Michaël Llodra (Italy) Diego Nargiso
- Runners-up: (Spain) Alberto Martín (Spain) Fernando Vicente
- Score: 7–6^{(7–2)}, 7–6^{(7–3)}

Details
- Draw: 16
- Seeds: 4

Events
Singles	Doubles
← 1999 ·	Majorca Open	· 2001 →

Lucas Arnold and Tomás Carbonell were the defending champions, but did not participate together this year. Arnold partnered Martín García, losing in the first round. Carbonell partnered Piet Norval, losing in the first round.

Michaël Llodra and Diego Nargiso won in the final 7–6^{(7–2)}, 7–6^{(7–3)}, against Alberto Martín and Fernando Vicente.

== Seeds ==
1. (Spain) Tomás Carbonell / (South Africa) Piet Norval (first round)
2. (United States) Devin Bowen / (United States) Jeff Tarango (first round)
3. (Argentina) Lucas Arnold / (Argentina) Martín García (first round)
4. (South Africa) Marius Barnard / (South Africa) Robbie Koenig (first round)

== Draw ==
=== Key ===
- Q = Qualifier
- WC = Wild card
- LL = Lucky loser
- Alt = Alternate
- ITF = ITF entry
- PR = Protected ranking
- SR = Special ranking
- SE = Special exempt
- JE = Junior exempt
- JR = Junior Accelerator Programme entrant
- CO = College Accelerator Programme entrant
- NG = Next Gen Accelerator Program entrant
- w/o = Walkover
- r = Retired
- d = Defaulted

=== Draw ===
First round
1	(Spain) T Carbonell (South Africa) P Norval	4	6	4
(Spain) A Portas (Serbia and Montenegro) D Vemić	6	3	6
(Sweden) S Aspelin (Sweden) J Landsberg	6	6
WC	(Spain) A Berasategui (Spain) F Roig	4	0
3	(Argentina) L Arnold (Argentina) M García	6	1	1
(Argentina) P Albano (Russia) M Safin	4	6	6
(United States) F Montana (Russia) A Olhovskiy	3	2
Q	(France) M Llodra (Italy) D Nargiso	6	6
(Portugal) N Marques (Belgium) T Vanhoudt	6	6
(Spain) E Nicolás (Spain) G Puentes	3	1
(Czech Republic) P Pála (Czech Republic) P Vízner	3	6	6
4	(South Africa) M Barnard (South Africa) R Koenig	6	3	4
WC	(Spain) J Balcells (Argentina) M Puerta	6^{5}	6	4
(Spain) JI Carrasco (Spain) J Velasco Jr.	7	4	6
WC	(Spain) A Martín (Spain) F Vicente	6	7^{8}
2	(United States) D Bowen (United States) J Tarango	2	6^{6}

Quarterfinals
(Spain) A Portas (Serbia and Montenegro) D Vemić	6^{0}	4
(Sweden) S Aspelin (Sweden) J Landsberg	7^{7}	6
(Argentina) P Albano (Russia) M Safin	5	3
Q	(France) M Llodra (Italy) D Nargiso	7	6
(Portugal) N Marques (Belgium) T Vanhoudt	6	5	6
(Czech Republic) P Pála (Czech Republic) P Vízner	4	7	3
(Spain) JI Carrasco (Spain) J Velasco Jr.	4	6^{4}
WC	(Spain) A Martín (Spain) F Vicente	6	7^{7}

Semifinals
(Sweden) S Aspelin (Sweden) J Landsberg	3	5
Q	(France) M Llodra (Italy) D Nargiso	6	7
(Portugal) N Marques (Belgium) T Vanhoudt	5	3
WC	(Spain) A Martín (Spain) F Vicente	7	6

Final
Q	(France) M Llodra (Italy) D Nargiso	7^{7}	7^{7}
WC	(Spain) A Martín (Spain) F Vicente	6^{2}	6^{3}
