= Challenger Internazionale Dell'Insubria =

Tennis tournament in Switzerland

Defunct tennis tournament
- Founded: 2006
- Abolished: 2008
- Editions: 3
- Location: Chiasso, Switzerland
- Category: ATP Challenger Series
- Surface: Clay / Outdoors
- Draw: 32S/32Q/16D
- Website: Official website

The Challenger Internazionale Dell'Insubria was a tennis tournament held in Chiasso, Switzerland, since 2006. The event was part of the ATP Challenger Series and was played on outdoor clay courts.

Werner Eschauer was the only player to win both singles and doubles title the same year.

== Past finals ==
=== Singles ===
Year	Champion	Runner-up	Score
2006	(Austria) Werner Eschauer (1)	(Germany) Simon Greul	6-1, 6-2
2007	(Austria) Werner Eschauer (2)	(Germany) Michael Berrer	6-3, 6-2
2008	(Morocco) Younes El Aynaoui	(Spain) Alberto Martín	7-6, 6-3

=== Doubles ===
Year	Champion	Runner-up	Score
2006	(Italy) Leonardo Azzaro (Croatia) Lovro Zovko	(Israel) Amir Hadad (Croatia) Roko Karanušić	6-2, 7-5
2007	(Netherlands) Bart Beks (Netherlands) Matwe Middelkoop	(Romania) Teodor-Dacian Crăciun (Romania) Victor Crivoi	7-6, 7-5
2008	(Argentina) Mariano Hood (Spain) Alberto Martín	(Italy) Fabio Colangelo (Italy) Marco Crugnola	4-6, 7-6, [11-9]
