= 2007 French Open – Men's singles =

Men's singles
- 2007 French Open

Final
- Champion: (Spain) Rafael Nadal
- Runner-up: (Switzerland) Roger Federer
- Score: 6–3, 4–6, 6–3, 6–4

Events
Singles	men	women		boys	girls
Doubles	men	women	mixed	boys	girls
WC Singles	men	women	quad
WC Doubles	men	women	quad
Legends	−45	45+	women
- French Open

Two-time defending champion Rafael Nadal defeated Roger Federer in a rematch of the previous year's final, 6–3, 4–6, 6–3, 6–4 to win the men's singles tennis title at the 2007 French Open. It was his third French Open title and third major title overall.

For the second consecutive year, Federer was attempting to complete the career Grand Slam and to become the first man since Rod Laver in 1969 to hold all four major titles at once, having won the preceding Wimbledon Championships, US Open, and Australian Open. It was the second of three consecutive years Nadal and Federer would contest the French Open final, and the third of four consecutive years they would meet at the event (extending back to the 2005 semifinals). Novak Djokovic, who would go on to hold all four major titles at once at the 2016 French Open, reached his first major semifinal at this event.

Federer made a record-breaking eighth consecutive major final appearance (streak starting at the 2005 Wimbledon Championships), surpassing Jack Crawford's record of seven consecutive finals, reached between 1933 and 1934.

== Seeds ==
1. (Switzerland) Roger Federer (final)
2. (Spain) Rafael Nadal (champion)
3. (United States) Andy Roddick (first round)
4. (Russia) Nikolay Davydenko (semifinals)
5. (Chile) Fernando González (first round)
6. (Serbia) Novak Djokovic (semifinals)
7. (Croatia) Ivan Ljubičić (third round)
8. (United States) James Blake (first round)
9. (Spain) Tommy Robredo (quarterfinals)
10. (Czech Republic) Tomáš Berdych (first round)
11. (France) Richard Gasquet (second round)
12. (Spain) David Ferrer (third round)
13. (Russia) Mikhail Youzhny (fourth round)
14. (Australia) Lleyton Hewitt (fourth round)
15. (Argentina) David Nalbandian (fourth round)
16. (Cyprus) Marcos Baghdatis (fourth round)

17. (Spain) Juan Carlos Ferrero (third round)
18. (Argentina) Juan Ignacio Chela (second round)
19. (Argentina) Guillermo Cañas (quarterfinals)
20. (Finland) Jarkko Nieminen (third round)
21. (Russia) Dmitry Tursunov (second round)
22. (Russia) Marat Safin (second round)
23. (Spain) Carlos Moyá (quarterfinals)
24. (Slovakia) Dominik Hrbatý (first round)
25. (Sweden) Robin Söderling (first round)
26. (Argentina) Agustín Calleri (first round)
27. (Austria) Jürgen Melzer (second round)
28. (Germany) Philipp Kohlschreiber (second round)
29. (Italy) Filippo Volandri (fourth round)
30. (France) Julien Benneteau (first round)
31. (Germany) Florian Mayer (first round)
32. (Spain) Nicolás Almagro (second round)

Click on the seed number of a player to go to their draw section.

== Draw ==
Key

- Q = Qualifier
- WC = Wild card
- LL = Lucky loser
- Alt = Alternate
- ITF = ITF entry
- PR = Protected ranking
- SR = Special ranking
- SE = Special exempt
- JE = Junior exempt
- JR = Junior Accelerator Programme entrant
- CO = College Accelerator Programme entrant
- NG = Next Gen Accelerator Program entrant
- w/o = Walkover
- r = Retired
- d = Defaulted

=== Finals ===
Quarterfinals
1	(Switzerland) Roger Federer	7	1	6	6
9	(Spain) Tommy Robredo	5	6	1	2
4	(Russia) Nikolay Davydenko	7	6	6
19	(Argentina) Guillermo Cañas	5	4	4
6	(Serbia) Novak Djokovic	6	6	6
PR	(Russia) Igor Andreev	3	3	3
23	(Spain) Carlos Moyá	4	3	0
2	(Spain) Rafael Nadal	6	6	6

Semifinals
1	(Switzerland) Roger Federer	7	7^{7}	7^{9}
4	(Russia) Nikolay Davydenko	5	6^{5}	6^{7}
6	(Serbia) Novak Djokovic	5	4	2
2	(Spain) Rafael Nadal	7	6	6

Final
1	(Switzerland) Roger Federer	3	6	3	4
2	(Spain) Rafael Nadal	6	4	6	6

=== Top half ===
==== Section 1 ====
First round
1	(Switzerland) R Federer	6	6	6
(United States) M Russell	4	2	4
Q	(Croatia) M Čilić	2	2	1
WC	(France) T Ascione	6	6	6
Q	(Czech Republic) I Minář	6	1	4	6^{5}
(Italy) P Starace	4	6	6	7^{7}
(Argentina) C Berlocq	6^{5}	7	6	6
30	(France) J Benneteau	7^{7}	5	2	3
17	(Spain) JC Ferrero	6^{2}	6	6	6
(United States) A Delić	7^{7}	3	3	4
(Austria) S Koubek	6^{7}	7^{7}	6	1
Q	(Belgium) C Rochus	7^{9}	6^{1}	4	2^{r}
(Ecuador) N Lapentti	6	6	2
(Austria) A Peya	1	4	1^{r}
(Czech Republic) J Hernych	0^{r}
13	(Russia) M Youzhny	0

Second round
1	(Switzerland) R Federer	6	6	7^{10}
WC	(France) T Ascione	1	2	6^{8}
(Italy) P Starace	6	6	6
(Argentina) C Berlocq	2	4	2
17	(Spain) JC Ferrero	6	7	6
(Austria) S Koubek	4	5	3
(Ecuador) N Lapentti	3	0	4
13	(Russia) M Youzhny	6	6	6

Third round
1	(Switzerland) R Federer	6	6	6
(Italy) P Starace	2	3	0
17	(Spain) JC Ferrero	7^{7}	6^{3}	2	2
13	(Russia) M Youzhny	6^{3}	7^{7}	6	6

Fourth round
1	(Switzerland) R Federer	7^{7}	6	6
13	(Russia) M Youzhny	6^{3}	4	4

==== Section 2 ====
First round
9	(Spain) T Robredo	6	6	6
(Argentina) S Roitman	3	4	2
(Australia) C Guccione	7^{8}	4	4	1
Q	(Greece) K Economidis	6^{6}	6	6	6
(Serbia) J Tipsarević	7^{7}	6	4	6
Q	(Serbia) D Vemić	6^{3}	4	6	3
LL	(Spain) F Vicente	1	3	1
22	(Russia) M Safin	6	6	6
29	(Italy) F Volandri	6	7	6
Q	(Chile) P Capdeville	3	5	3
(Argentina) M Vassallo Argüello	6	6	6^{3}	7^{7}
(Colombia) A Falla	3	3	7^{7}	6^{4}
(Spain) R Ramírez Hidalgo	6	7	2	5	4
(Switzerland) S Wawrinka	0	5	6	7	6
(France) A Clément	1	5	6^{2}
7	(Croatia) I Ljubičić	6	7	7^{7}

Second round
9	(Spain) T Robredo	6	7	6
Q	(Greece) K Economidis	4	5	4
(Serbia) J Tipsarević	6	6	7
22	(Russia) M Safin	4	4	5
29	(Italy) F Volandri	7^{7}	7	6
(Argentina) M Vassallo Argüello	6^{2}	5	2
(Switzerland) S Wawrinka	4	3	7^{7}	3
7	(Croatia) I Ljubičić	6	6	6^{3}	6

Third round
9	(Spain) T Robredo	6	6	6
(Serbia) J Tipsarević	3	4	0
29	(Italy) F Volandri	6	6^{4}	4	6	6
7	(Croatia) I Ljubičić	4	7^{7}	6	3	4

Fourth round
9	(Spain) T Robredo	6	7	6
29	(Italy) F Volandri	2	5	1

==== Section 3 ====
First round
4	(Russia) N Davydenko	6	6	6
(Italy) S Galvani	3	1	1
WC	(France) A Sidorenko	3	6	3	4^{r}
(Austria) W Eschauer	6	3	6	5
(France) M Llodra	6	6	6
(France) N Devilder	4	3	3
PR	(United States) J Gimelstob	4	4	4
32	(Spain) N Almagro	6	6	6
18	(Argentina) JI Chela	6^{5}	6	6	6
(France) F Santoro	7^{7}	0	3	3
(Belgium) O Rochus	6	4	2	6	1
(France) G Monfils	4	6	6	3	6
Q	(Spain) I Navarro	7^{7}	6	6
Q	(Serbia) B Pašanski	6^{1}	4	4
(South Korea) H-t Lee	2	1	6	3
15	(Argentina) D Nalbandian	6	6	3	6

Second round
4	(Russia) N Davydenko	7	6	6
(Austria) W Eschauer	5	3	1
(France) M Llodra	2	6	6^{7}	6	6
32	(Spain) N Almagro	6	2	7^{9}	4	4
18	(Argentina) JI Chela	6	3	3	1
(France) G Monfils	3	6	6	6
Q	(Spain) I Navarro	5	4	4
15	(Argentina) D Nalbandian	7	6	6

Third round
4	(Russia) N Davydenko	6	6	6
(France) M Llodra	4	2	4
(France) G Monfils	6^{5}	7	4	6^{5}
15	(Argentina) D Nalbandian	7^{7}	5	6	7^{7}

Fourth round
4	(Russia) N Davydenko	6	7^{7}	3	7^{7}
15	(Argentina) D Nalbandian	3	6^{1}	6	6^{2}

==== Section 4 ====
First round
11	(France) R Gasquet	6	6	6
WC	(France) N Mahut	3	2	2
(Belgium) K Vliegen	6	6	6
(Thailand) D Udomchoke	2	4	3
PR	(Netherlands) M Verkerk	1	4	4
(Italy) S Bolelli	6	6	6
PR	(Romania) V Hănescu	3	1	4
19	(Argentina) G Cañas	6	6	6
27	(Austria) J Melzer	6	7	6
(Argentina) J Acasuso	4	5	4
Q	(Italy) F Fognini	6	6	1	2	4
(Argentina) J Mónaco	3	2	6	6	6
WC	(France) É Roger-Vasselin	6	4
Q	(Brazil) M Daniel	1	1^{r}
(Czech Republic) R Štěpánek	6	6	6
5	(Chile) F González	2	2	4

Second round
11	(France) R Gasquet	6^{4}	3	1
(Belgium) K Vliegen	7^{7}	6	6
(Italy) S Bolelli	4	3	3
19	(Argentina) G Cañas	6	6	6
27	(Austria) J Melzer	2	3	2
(Argentina) J Mónaco	6	6	6
WC	(France) É Roger-Vasselin	3	6	0	6	6
(Czech Republic) R Štěpánek	6	1	6	4	4

Third round
(Belgium) K Vliegen	2	2	6	3
19	(Argentina) G Cañas	6	6	2	6
(Argentina) J Mónaco	6	6	6
WC	(France) É Roger-Vasselin	4	2	4

Fourth round
19	(Argentina) G Cañas	6	6	6
(Argentina) J Mónaco	0	4	2

=== Bottom half ===
==== Section 5 ====
First round
6	(Serbia) N Djokovic	6	7^{7}	6
LL	(Colombia) S Giraldo	3	6^{3}	4
(United States) S Querrey	6^{4}	6	0	7^{7}	3
Q	(France) L Recouderc	7^{7}	2	6	6^{5}	6
WC	(France) J Eysseric	1	6	2	4
WC	(France) O Patience	6	3	6	6
LL	(Argentina) M Zabaleta	6	6^{5}	7^{7}	7
26	(Argentina) A Calleri	4	7^{7}	6^{5}	5
21	(Russia) D Tursunov	6	6	3	6
(Italy) A di Mauro	3	4	6	3
(Spain) F Verdasco	4	6	6	6
Q	(France) J Haehnel	6	2	2	0
(United States) R Ginepri	4	6	7	4	2
(Argentina) D Hartfield	6	1	5	6	6
(Italy) D Bracciali	1	1	2
12	(Spain) D Ferrer	6	6	6

Second round
6	(Serbia) N Djokovic	6	3	6	6
Q	(France) L Recouderc	3	6	3	1
WC	(France) O Patience	7	6	3	2	6
LL	(Argentina) M Zabaleta	5	3	6	6	4
21	(Russia) D Tursunov	4	4	4
(Spain) F Verdasco	6	6	6
(Argentina) D Hartfield	4	3	6^{4}
12	(Spain) D Ferrer	6	6	7^{7}

Third round
6	(Serbia) N Djokovic	7^{7}	2	3	7^{7}	6
WC	(France) O Patience	6^{2}	6	6	6^{4}	3
(Spain) F Verdasco	4	7^{7}	6	6
12	(Spain) D Ferrer	6	6^{2}	3	3

Fourth round
6	(Serbia) N Djokovic	6	6	7^{7}
(Spain) F Verdasco	3	3	6^{1}

==== Section 6 ====
First round
16	(Cyprus) M Baghdatis	6	6	6
(France) S Grosjean	3	2	4
(Denmark) K Pless	6	6	7^{7}
(Chinese Taipei) Y-h Lu	3	2	6^{1}
(Sweden) T Johansson	5	6^{3}	6^{3}
(Czech Republic) J Hájek	7	7^{7}	7^{7}
Q	(Czech Republic) B Ulihrach	6	5	6^{3}	6	6
24	(Slovakia) D Hrbatý	2	7	7^{7}	4	3
31	(Germany) F Mayer	3	4	2
(France) P-H Mathieu	6	6	6
(United States) V Spadea	6	4	4	3
(France) G Simon	2	6	6	6
(Peru) L Horna	4	5	6	7^{7}	2
(Chile) N Massú	6	7	3	6^{1}	6
PR	(Russia) I Andreev	3	6	6	6
3	(United States) A Roddick	6	4	3	4

Second round
16	(Cyprus) M Baghdatis	7	6	6
(Denmark) K Pless	5	3	4
(Czech Republic) J Hájek	1	6	7^{8}	3	6
Q	(Czech Republic) B Ulihrach	6	2	6^{6}	6	2
(France) P-H Mathieu	3	6	6	7^{7}
(France) G Simon	6	4	1	6^{2}
(Chile) N Massú	3	6	3	5
PR	(Russia) I Andreev	6	3	6	7

Third round
16	(Cyprus) M Baghdatis	6	6	0
(Czech Republic) J Hájek	2	2	0^{r}
(France) P-H Mathieu	6^{4}	0	3
PR	(Russia) I Andreev	7^{7}	6	6

Fourth round
16	(Cyprus) M Baghdatis	6	1	3	4
PR	(Russia) I Andreev	2	6	6	6

==== Section 7 ====
First round
8	(United States) J Blake	6	4	5	5
(Croatia) I Karlović	4	6	7	7
WC	(Australia) P Luczak	7^{7}	7	3	3	1
(Sweden) J Björkman	6^{4}	5	6	6	6
LL	(Argentina) JP Guzmán	6^{4}	0	2
(Spain) Ó Hernández	7^{7}	6	6
Q	(Czech Republic) L Dlouhý	2	6	5	6	15
28	(Germany) P Kohlschreiber	6	3	7	4	17
23	(Spain) C Moyá	6	3	6	2	6
(Italy) A Seppi	1	6	3	6	0
(France) F Serra	6	6	6
(Russia) I Kunitsyn	3	0	2
(United States) R Kendrick	1	6	2	1
Q	(Argentina) JP Brzezicki	6	3	6	6
(Spain) G García López	7	6	6
10	(Czech Republic) T Berdych	5	4	4

Second round
(Croatia) I Karlović	6	6	4	6^{2}	3
(Sweden) J Björkman	3	3	6	7^{7}	6
(Spain) Ó Hernández	7^{10}	6	6
28	(Germany) P Kohlschreiber	6^{8}	1	1
23	(Spain) C Moyá	6	6	6
(France) F Serra	4	2	4
Q	(Argentina) JP Brzezicki	7^{7}	6	6
(Spain) G García López	6^{4}	2	0

Third round
(Sweden) J Björkman	6^{3}	6	6	6
(Spain) Ó Hernández	7^{7}	3	0	1
23	(Spain) C Moyá	6	6	7
Q	(Argentina) JP Brzezicki	1	3	5

Fourth round
(Sweden) J Björkman	6^{5}	2	5
23	(Spain) C Moyá	7^{7}	6	7

==== Section 8 ====
First round
14	(Australia) L Hewitt	6	6	6
(Belarus) M Mirnyi	3	1	3
(France) M Gicquel	6	3	6	4	3
(Argentina) G Gaudio	3	6	3	6	6
(Germany) B Becker	3	1	3
WC	(France) M Montcourt	6	6	6
(Spain) F López	2	4	6^{2}
20	(Finland) J Nieminen	6	6	7^{7}
25	(Sweden) R Söderling	6^{4}	1^{r}
(Spain) Á Montañés	7^{7}	4
(Latvia) E Gulbis	6	6	6
(United Kingdom) T Henman	4	3	2
Q	(Italy) F Cipolla	7^{8}	6	5
(Russia) T Gabashvili	6^{6}	3	2^{r}
(Argentina) JM del Potro	5	3	2
2	(Spain) R Nadal	7	6	6

Second round
14	(Australia) L Hewitt	4	3	6	6	6
(Argentina) G Gaudio	6	6	2	4	2
WC	(France) M Montcourt	1	1	4
20	(Finland) J Nieminen	6	6	6
(Spain) Á Montañés	6	6	1	7^{7}
(Latvia) E Gulbis	1	2	6	6^{3}
Q	(Italy) F Cipolla	2	1	4
2	(Spain) R Nadal	6	6	6

Third round
14	(Australia) L Hewitt	1	6	7	6
20	(Finland) J Nieminen	6	3	5	2
(Spain) Á Montañés	1	3	2
2	(Spain) R Nadal	6	6	6

Fourth round
14	(Australia) L Hewitt	3	1	6^{5}
2	(Spain) R Nadal	6	6	7^{7}

Preceded by 2007 Australian Open – Men's singles	Grand Slam men's singles	Succeeded by 2007 Wimbledon Championships – Men's singles
