= Bart Beks =

Dutch tennis player (born 1973)

- Country (sports): Netherlands
- Born: 4 July 1973 (age 52) Netherlands
- Plays: Right-handed
- Prize money: $58,315

Singles
- Career record: 0–0
- Career titles: 0; 0 Challenger, 0 Futures
- Highest ranking: No. 595 (15 November 2004)

Doubles
- Career record: 0–3
- Career titles: 0; 1 Challenger, 10 Futures
- Highest ranking: No. 174 (8 August 2005)
- Last updated on: 22 May 2021.

Bart Beks (born 4 July 1973) is a retired Dutch professional tennis player.

Beks reached a career-high ATP singles ranking of World No. 595 achieved on 15 November 2004. He also had a career high ATP doubles ranking of World No. 174 achieved on 8 August 2005.

Beks made his ATP Tour main draw debut in doubles at the 2006 Ordina Open held on grass courts in 's-Hertogenbosch, Netherlands. Partnering up with compatriot Martijn van Haasteren, the pair received a wild-card entry into the main doubles draw. They were defeated in the first round by French duo Florent Serra and Julien Benneteau in straight sets 2–6, 6–7^{(7–9)}. Again with van Haasteren, the pair received a direct entry into the 2007 Swedish Open main doubles draw, but also lost in the first round to Swedish pair Robin Söderling and Johan Brunström 3–6, 2–6.

Beks reached two career singles finals with a record of 0 wins and 2 losses both occurring on the ITF Futures circuit on clay courts. Additionally, he has reached 25 career doubles finals, with a record of 11 wins and 14 losses which includes a 1–5 record in ATP Challenger finals. In 2007 he won the Chiasso Challenger doubles title with Matwé Middelkoop defeating Romanians Teodor-Dacian Crăciun and Victor Crivoi 7–6^{(7–2)}, 7–5 in the final match to claim his first and what would become the only ATP Challenger title of his career.

== ATP Challenger and ITF Futures finals ==
=== Singles: 2 (0–2) ===
Legend ATP Challenger (0–0) ITF Futures (0–2)	Finals by surface Hard (0–0) Clay (0–2) Grass (0–0) Carpet (0–0)

Result	W–L	Date	Tournament	Tier	Surface	Opponent	Score
Loss	0–1	Aug 2004	Estonia F1, Tallinn	Futures	Clay	(Finland) Janne Ojala	6–7^{(4–7)}, 3–6
Loss	0–2	Jun 2008	Macedonia F2, Skopje	Futures	Clay	(Bosnia and Herzegovina) Sinisa Markovic	4–6, 3–6

=== Doubles: 25 (11–14) ===
Legend ATP Challenger (1–5) ITF Futures (10–9)	Finals by surface Hard (0–4) Clay (11–9) Grass (0–0) Carpet (0–1)

Result	W–L	Date	Tournament	Tier	Surface	Partner	Opponents	Score
Win	1–0	Oct 2002	Dominican Republic F1, Santo Domingo	Futures	Clay	(Netherlands) Raoul Snijders	(Dominican Republic) Jose Bernard (Dominican Republic) Rodrigo Vallejo	6–4, 6–2
Loss	1–1	Jun 2003	Estonia F1A, Tallinn	Futures	Clay	(Estonia) Mait Künnap	(Latvia) Andis Juška (Norway) Stian Boretti	4–6, 4–6
Win	2–1	Jul 2003	Netherlands F3, Heerhugowaard	Futures	Clay	(Netherlands) Remco Pondman	(Japan) Jun Kato (Belgium) Stefan Wauters	6–4, 4–6, 7–6^{(7–4)}
Win	3–1	Aug 2003	Poland F1, Poznań	Futures	Clay	(Czech Republic) Petr Dezort	(Poland) Tomasz Bednarek (Poland) Filip Aniola	7–6^{(9–7)}, 6–4
Loss	3–2	Sep 2003	Kenya F1, Mombasa	Futures	Hard	(Netherlands) Matwé Middelkoop	(South Africa) Wesley Whitehouse (South Africa) Willem-Petrus Meyer	3–6, 6–7^{(3–7)}
Loss	3–3	Nov 2003	Aruba F1, Oranjestad	Futures	Hard	(Netherlands) Paul Logtens	(Italy) Alessandro Motti (France) Stéphane Robert	4–6, 0–6
Loss	3–4	Jun 2004	Finland F2, Vierumäki	Futures	Clay	(Netherlands) Rick Schalkers	(Denmark) Frederik Nielsen (Denmark) Rasmus Nørby	6–7^{(2–7)}, 3–6
Win	4–4	Jul 2004	Denmark F3, Lyngby	Futures	Clay	(Italy) Stefano Ianni	(Finland) Iouri Barkov (Finland) Juho Paukku	6–2, 6–1
Loss	4–5	Aug 2004	Estonia F1, Tallinn	Futures	Clay	(Estonia) Mait Künnap	(Sweden) Alexander Hartman (Sweden) Johan Brunström	6–7^{(6–8)}, 6–7^{(3–7)}
Win	5–5	Aug 2004	Latvia F1, Jūrmala	Futures	Clay	(Estonia) Mait Künnap	(Netherlands) Jasper Smit (Germany) Simon Stadler	6–4, 5–7, 7–6^{(7–3)}
Win	6–5	Aug 2004	Lithuania F2, Vilnius	Futures	Clay	(Estonia) Mait Künnap	(Poland) Marcin Maszczyk (Poland) Radoslav Nijaki	6–4, 4–6, 6–3
Loss	6–6	Aug 2004	Poland F4, Poznań	Futures	Clay	(Poland) Tomasz Bednarek	(Poland) Filip Urban (Poland) Filip Aniola	1–6, 7–6^{(7–5)}, 3–6
Win	7–6	Oct 2004	Georgia F1, Tbilisi	Futures	Clay	(Estonia) Mait Künnap	(Russia) KirillI vanov-Smolenskii (Russia) Philipp Mukhometov	6–4, 6–4
Win	8–6	Oct 2004	Georgia F2, Tbilisi	Futures	Clay	(Estonia) Mait Künnap	(Germany) Bastian Knittel (Germany) Peter Mayer-Tischer	6–7^{(4–7)}, 6–1, 6–3
Loss	8–7	May 2005	Dresden, Germany	Challenger	Clay	(Netherlands) Martijn van Haasteren	(Germany) Christopher Kas (Germany) Philipp Petzschner	7–6^{(7–2)}, 2–6, 4–6
Win	9–7	Jun 2005	France F8, Blois	Futures	Clay	(Netherlands) Matwé Middelkoop	(France) Stéphane Robert (Spain) Esteban Carril	4–6 6–2, 6–3
Loss	9–8	Oct 2005	Barcelona, Spain	Challenger	Clay	(Netherlands) Martijn van Haasteren	(Spain) David Marrero (Spain) Gabriel Trujillo Soler	4–6, 4–6
Loss	9–9	Jan 2006	Germany F4, Kaarst	Futures	Carpet	(Netherlands) Matwé Middelkoop	(Germany) Bastian Knittel (Germany) Ralph Grambow	6–7^{(4–7)}, 6–7^{(5–7)}
Loss	9–10	Mar 2006	Portugal F1, Faro	Futures	Hard	(Netherlands) Matwé Middelkoop	(Italy) Alessandro da Col (Spain) Marcel Granollers	4–6, 6–3, 2–6
Loss	9–11	May 2006	Tunis, Tunisia	Challenger	Clay	(Netherlands) Martijn van Haasteren	(Spain) Iván Navarro (Spain) Daniel Gimeno Traver	2–6, 5–7
Win	10–11	Apr 2007	Chiasso, Switzerland	Challenger	Clay	(Netherlands) Matwé Middelkoop	(Romania) Teodor-Dacian Crăciun (Romania) Victor Crivoi	7–6^{(7–2)}, 7–5
Win	11–11	Nov 2007	El Salvador F2, La Libertad	Futures	Clay	(Colombia) Michael Quintero Aguilar	(United States) Brad Pomeroy (Romania) Raian Luchici	6–3, 0–6, [10–8]
Loss	11–12	Nov 2007	Guayaquil, Ecuador	Challenger	Clay	(Colombia) Michael Quintero Aguilar	(Argentina) Brian Dabul (Argentina) Juan Pablo Guzmán	6–7^{(5–7)}, 3–6
Loss	11–13	May 2008	Greece F3, Kalamata	Futures	Hard	(Republic of Ireland) Tristan Farron-Mahon	(United Kingdom) Neil Bamford (United Kingdom) Matthew Illingworth	3–6, 1–6
Loss	11–14	Sep 2008	Alphen, Netherlands	Challenger	Clay	(Netherlands) Matwé Middelkoop	(Germany) Philipp Marx (Australia) Rameez Junaid	3–6, 2–6
