= Juan Pablo Guzmán =

Argentine tennis player

- Country (sports): Argentina
- Residence: Buenos Aires, Argentina
- Born: January 29, 1981 (age 45) Buenos Aires, Argentina
- Height: 1.78 m (5 ft 10 in)
- Turned pro: 1999
- Retired: 2014 (last match played)
- Plays: Left-handed (two-handed backhand)
- Prize money: US $408,122

Singles
- Career record: 6–17
- Career titles: 0
- Highest ranking: No. 100 (25 June 2007)

Grand Slam singles results
- Australian Open: Q1 (2003, 2004)
- French Open: 1R (2007)
- Wimbledon: 1R (2002, 2007)
- US Open: 1R (2007)

Doubles
- Career record: 5–5
- Career titles: 1
- Highest ranking: No. 86 (19 November 2007)

Grand Slam doubles results
- Wimbledon: Q1 (2004)

Juan Pablo Guzmán (born January 29, 1981) is a professional tennis player and coach from Argentina. In 2007, Guzmán won the ATP doubles title in Amersfoort with Juan Pablo Brzezicki where the Argentine duo defeated Robin Haase and Rogier Wassen in straight sets in the final. In singles, he reached the quarterfinals of Umag in 2006 and made the main draw first round of four Grand Slam tournaments between 2002 and 2007.

== Performance timeline ==
Key
W	F	SF	QF	#R	RR	Q#	DNQ	A	NH

(W) winner; (F) finalist; (SF) semifinalist; (QF) quarterfinalist; (#R) rounds 4, 3, 2, 1; (RR) round-robin stage; (Q#) qualification round; (DNQ) did not qualify; (A) absent; (NH) not held; (SR) strike rate (events won / competed); (W–L) win–loss record.
To avoid confusion and double counting, these charts are updated at the conclusion of a tournament or when the player's participation has ended.

=== Singles ===
Tournament	2002	2003	2004	2005	2006	2007	SR	W–L	Win %
Grand Slam tournaments
Australian Open	A	Q1	Q1	A	A	A	0 / 0	0–0	–
French Open	A	Q1	A	Q2	Q1	1R	0 / 1	0–1	0%
Wimbledon	1R	Q2	Q1	Q1	A	1R	0 / 2	0–2	0%
US Open	Q1	A	Q2	A	A	1R	0 / 1	0–1	0%
Win–loss	0–1	0–0	0–0	0–0	0–0	0–3	0 / 4	0–4	0%

== ATP Career Finals ==
=== Doubles: 1 (1 title) ===
Legend (doubles) Grand Slam (0–0) ATP World Tour Finals (0–0) ATP Masters Series (0–0) ATP Championship Series (0–0) ATP International Series (1–0)	Finals by surface Hard (0–0) Clay (1–0) Grass (0–0) Carpet (0–0)	Finals by setting Outdoor (0–0) Indoor (1–0)

Result	W–L	Date	Tournament	Tier	Surface	Partner	Opponents	Score
Win	1–0	Jul 2007	Amersfoort, Netherlands	International Series	Clay	(Argentina) Juan Pablo Brzezicki	(Netherlands) Robin Haase (Netherlands) Rogier Wassen	6–2, 6–0

== ATP Challenger and ITF Futures finals ==
=== Singles: 11 (5–6) ===
Legend ATP Challenger (3–1) ITF Futures (2–5)	Finals by surface Hard (1–0) Clay (4–6) Grass (0–0) Carpet (0–0)

Result	W–L	Date	Tournament	Tier	Surface	Opponent	Score
Win	1–0	Jul 2000	Argentina F7, Concordia	Futures	Clay	(Argentina) Patricio Arquez	6–3, 6–1
Loss	1–1	Aug 2000	Argentina F10, Buenos Aires	Futures	Clay	(Argentina) Gustavo Marcaccio	1–6, 7–6^{(7–5)}, 5–7
Loss	1–2	Sep 2000	Peri F2, Lima	Futures	Clay	(Argentina) Diego Veronelli	0–2 ret.
Loss	1–3	Sep 2001	Argentina F11, Buenos Aires	Futures	Clay	(Argentina) Juan Pablo Brzezicki	5–7, 5–7
Loss	1–4	Oct 2001	Brazil F6, Porto Alegre	Futures	Clay	(Brazil) Pedro Braga	6–7^{(4–7)}, 2–6
Loss	1–5	Oct 2001	Colombia F1, Bogotá	Futures	Clay	(Colombia) Michael Quintero	6–7^{(6–8)}, 4–6
Win	2–5	Jul 2003	Montauban, France	Challenger	Clay	(Algeria) Slimane Saoudi	6–3, 2–6, 6–1
Win	3–5	Oct 2003	USA F29, Arlington	Futures	Hard	(Serbia and Montenegro) Dušan Vemić	6–3, 7–5
Win	4–5	May 2004	Forest Hills, United States	Challenger	Clay	(Argentina) Edgardo Massa	7–6^{(9–7)}, 3–1 ret.
Win	5–5	Aug 2006	Trani, Italy	Challenger	Clay	(Sweden) Andreas Vinciguerra	6–1, 3–6, 7–6^{(7–1)}
Loss	5–6	Apr 2007	Florianópolis, Brazil	Challenger	Clay	(Chile) Paul Capdeville	6–7^{(0–7)}, 0–6

=== Doubles: 24 (12–12) ===
Legend ATP Challenger (5–9) ITF Futures (7–3)	Finals by surface Hard (0–2) Clay (12–10) Grass (0–0) Carpet (0–0)

Result	W–L	Date	Tournament	Tier	Surface	Partner	Opponents	Score
Win	1–0	May 2000	Chile F5, Santiago	Futures	Clay	(Argentina) Edgardo Massa	(Brazil) Adriano Ferreira (Brazil) Flávio Saretta	7–6^{(8–6)}, ret.
Win	2–0	May 2000	Chile F6, Santiago	Futures	Clay	(Chile) Sebastian Contador	(Chile) Jaime Fillol Jr. (Chile) Adrián García	3–6, 6–4, 6–1
Win	3–0	May 2000	Argentina F4, Mendoza	Futures	Clay	(Argentina) Sergio Roitman	(Chile) Miguel Miranda (Argentina) Juan Pablo Brzezicki	6–3, 6–4
Loss	3–1	Aug 2000	Argentina F8, Córdoba	Futures	Clay	(Argentina) Matias O'Neille	(Argentina) Martin Stringari (Italy) Tomas Tenconi	2–6, 4–6
Win	4–1	Apr 2001	Brazil F1, Rio de Janeiro	Futures	Clay	(Argentina) Enzo Artoni	(Argentina) Gustavo Marcaccio (Argentina) Patricio Rudi	4–6, 6–2, 6–1
Win	5–1	Apr 2001	Argentina F4, Mendoza	Futures	Clay	(Argentina) Cristian Villagrán	(Argentina) Diego del Río (Argentina) Leonardo Olguín	6–2, 3–6, 6–3
Loss	5–2	Aug 2001	Argentina F7, Buenos Aires	Futures	Clay	(Argentina) Diego Hartfield	(Argentina) Daniel Caracciolo (Argentina) Martín Vassallo Argüello	6–3, 2–6, 2–6
Win	6–2	Oct 2001	Colombia F1, Bogotá	Futures	Clay	(Argentina) Cristian Villagrán	(Brazil) Eduardo Bohrer (Brazil) Luis Marafelli	6–4, 7–6^{(7–1)}
Loss	6–3	Sep 2002	Banja Luka, Bosnia & Herzegovina	Challenger	Clay	(Argentina) Daniel Orsanic	(Czech Republic) Jaroslav Levinský (Russia) Yuri Schukin	6–7^{(5–7)}, 5–7
Loss	6–4	Jan 2003	Jamaica F1, Montego Bay	Futures	Hard	(Argentina) Diego Veronelli	(Argentina) Carlos Berlocq (Argentina) Cristian Villagrán	5–7, 4–6
Loss	6–5	Jul 2003	Montauban, France	Challenger	Clay	(Argentina) Ignacio Hirigoyen	(Netherlands) Fred Hemmes (Netherlands) Rogier Wassen	4–6, 4–6
Win	7–5	Sep 2003	Kyiv, Ukraine	Challenger	Clay	(Argentina) Ignacio González King	(India) Harsh Mankad (United States) Jason Marshall	6–2, 3–6, 6–4
Win	8–5	Sep 2003	Budapest, Hungary	Challenger	Clay	(Argentina) Ignacio González King	(Hungary) Kornél Bardóczky (Hungary) Gergely Kisgyörgy	7–5, 4–6, 6–3
Loss	8–6	Sep 2004	Brașov, Romania	Challenger	Clay	(Argentina) Juan Pablo Brzezicki	(Spain) Salvador Navarro (Spain) Rubén Ramírez Hidalgo	3–6, 2–6
Loss	8–7	Sep 2004	Budapest, Hungary	Challenger	Clay	(Argentina) Ignacio González King	(Argentina) Mariano Delfino (Argentina) Juan Pablo Brzezicki	6–2, 3–6, 2–6
Loss	8–8	Dec 2004	Aracaju, Brazil	Challenger	Clay	(Spain) Santiago Ventura	(Italy) Enzo Artoni (Argentina) Ignacio González King	4–6, 2–6
Loss	8–9	Mar 2005	Salinas, Ecuador	Challenger	Hard	(Argentina) Sergio Roitman	(Argentina) Cristian Villagrán (Argentina) Juan Pablo Brzezicki	2–6, 4–6
Loss	8–10	Mar 2005	San Luis Potosí, Mexico	Challenger	Clay	(Argentina) Juan Pablo Brzezicki	(Poland) Łukasz Kubot (Austria) Oliver Marach	1–6, 6–3, 4–6
Loss	8–11	May 2005	Tunica Resorts, United States	Challenger	Clay	(Argentina) Juan Pablo Brzezicki	(United States) Michael Russell (Serbia and Montenegro) Dušan Vemić	6–7^{(4–7)}, 3–6
Win	9–11	Jun 2007	Prostějov, Czech Republic	Challenger	Clay	(Paraguay) Ramón Delgado	(Czech Republic) Tomáš Cibulec (Czech Republic) Leoš Friedl	7–6^{(10–8)}, 6–1
Win	10–11	Aug 2007	San Marino, San Marino	Challenger	Clay	(Uruguay) Pablo Cuevas	(Poland) Tomasz Bednarek (United States) James Cerretani	6–1, 6–0
Loss	10–12	Sep 2007	Szczecin, Poland	Challenger	Clay	(Argentina) Juan Pablo Brzezicki	(Germany) Tomas Behrend (Germany) Christopher Kas	0–6, 7–5, [8–10]
Win	11–12	Nov 2007	Guayaquil, Ecuador	Challenger	Clay	(Argentina) Brian Dabul	(Netherlands) Bart Beks (Colombia) Michael Quintero	7–6^{(7–5)}, 6–1
Win	12–12	Sep 2014	Colombia F6, Armenia	Futures	Clay	(Dominican Republic) José Hernández-Fernández	(Italy) Marco Bortolotti (South Africa) Keith-Patrick Crowley	6–3, 2–6, [12–10]
