= Rogier Wassen =

Dutch tennis player

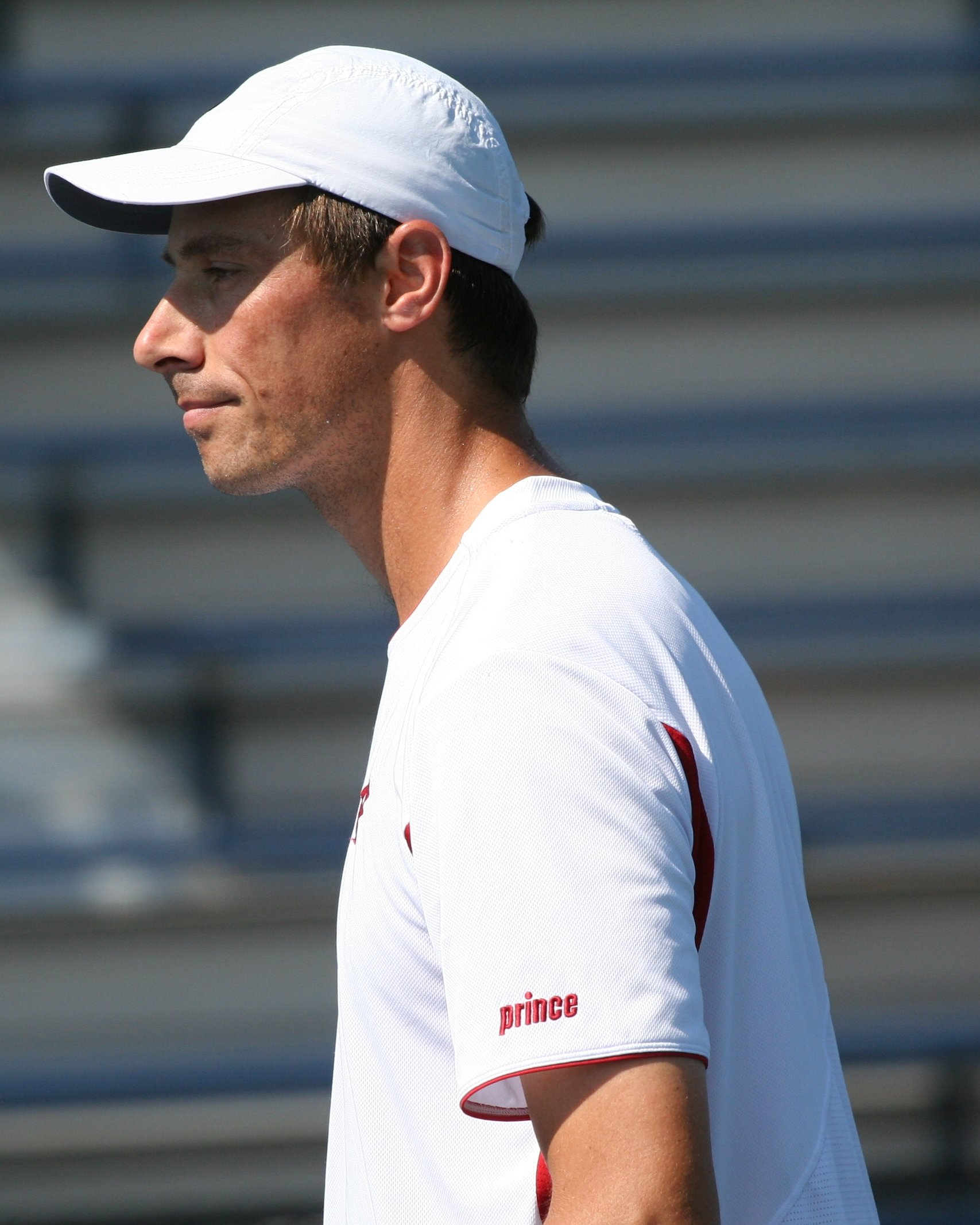
- Country (sports): Netherlands
- Residence: Düsseldorf, Germany
- Born: 9 August 1976 (age 49) Roermond, Netherlands
- Height: 1.90 m (6 ft 3 in)
- Turned pro: 1994
- Retired: 2014
- Plays: Right-handed (two-handed backhand)
- Prize money: $1,040,061

Singles
- Career record: 4–13
- Career titles: 0; 1 Challenger, 4 Futures
- Highest ranking: No. 143 (24 May 1999)

Grand Slam singles results
- Australian Open: Q1 (2001)
- French Open: Q3 (1997)
- Wimbledon: Q3 (2002)
- US Open: Q2 (1995, 2001)

Doubles
- Career record: 136–189
- Career titles: 5; 22 Challenger, 5 Futures
- Highest ranking: No. 24 (10 September 2007)

Grand Slam doubles results
- Australian Open: QF (2007)
- French Open: 3R (2004, 2007, 2009)
- Wimbledon: 3R (2005, 2008, 2009)
- US Open: 3R (2004, 2007)

Grand Slam mixed doubles results
- Australian Open: 2R (2008)
- French Open: QF (2008)
- Wimbledon: 2R (2006, 2007, 2009, 2011)
- US Open: 2R (2007, 2008)
- Last updated on: 24 June 2021.

Rogier Wassen (Dutch pronunciation: [roːˈɣiːr ˈʋɑsə(n)]; born 9 August 1976) is a Dutch tennis player who competed regularly on the ATP Tour primarily as a doubles player.

Wassen reached his highest doubles ranking on the ATP Tour on 10 September 2007 when he became World No. 24. The right-hander has won three ATP doubles titles. The Heineken Open in Auckland, New Zealand, in 2006 and 2007 teaming up with Andrei Pavel and Jeff Coetzee respectively. In 2007 he won the Ordina Open in 's-Hertogenbosch, Netherlands, again with Jeff Coetzee. In 2009, he reached the finals of the 2009 Hall of Fame Tennis Championships in Newport, Rhode Island, partnering with Michael Kohlmann.

He is nicknamed "Da Professor" by good friend and doubles partner Dustin Brown. He returned in doubles at 2013 Marburg Open, in partnership with Artem Sitak, losing in the first round against Vahid Mirzadeh and Denis Zivkovic

== Performance timelines ==
Key
W	F	SF	QF	#R	RR	Q#	DNQ	A	NH

(W) winner; (F) finalist; (SF) semifinalist; (QF) quarterfinalist; (#R) rounds 4, 3, 2, 1; (RR) round-robin stage; (Q#) qualification round; (DNQ) did not qualify; (A) absent; (NH) not held; (SR) strike rate (events won / competed); (W–L) win–loss record.

=== Singles ===
Tournament	1995	1996	1997	1998	1999	2000	2001	2002	SR	W–L	Win %
Grand Slam tournaments
Australian Open	A	A	A	A	A	A	Q1	A	0 / 0	0–0	–
French Open	A	A	Q3	A	Q2	A	A	A	0 / 0	0–0	–
Wimbledon	A	A	A	Q2	A	A	Q1	Q3	0 / 0	0–0	–
US Open	Q2	A	A	A	A	Q1	Q2	A	0 / 0	0–0	–
Win–loss	0–0	0–0	0–0	0–0	0–0	0–0	0–0	0–0	0 / 0	0–0	–
ATP Tour Masters 1000
Miami Open	A	A	A	A	Q1	A	A	A	0 / 0	0–0	–
Canada Masters	Q1	A	A	A	A	A	A	A	0 / 0	0–0	–
Win–loss	0–0	0–0	0–0	0–0	0–0	0–0	0–0	0–0	0 / 0	0–0	–

=== Doubles ===
Tournament	1998	1999	2000	2001	2002	2003	2004	2005	2006	2007	2008	2009	2010	2011	SR	W–L	Win %
Grand Slam tournaments
Australian Open	A	A	A	A	A	A	A	2R	2R	QF	3R	2R	1R	2R	0 / 7	9–7	56%
French Open	A	A	A	A	A	A	3R	1R	2R	3R	2R	3R	1R	1R	0 / 8	8–8	50%
Wimbledon	Q1	A	A	A	1R	A	1R	3R	1R	1R	3R	3R	1R	1R	0 / 9	6–9	40%
US Open	A	A	A	A	A	A	3R	1R	2R	3R	1R	2R	3R	2R	0 / 8	9–8	53%
Win–loss	0–0	0–0	0–0	0–0	0–1	0–0	4–3	3–4	3–4	7–4	5–4	6–4	2–4	2–4	0 / 32	32–32	50%
ATP Tour Masters 1000
Indian Wells	A	A	A	A	A	A	A	A	A	2R	1R	A	A	A	0 / 2	1–2	33%
Miami Open	A	A	A	A	A	A	A	A	1R	1R	2R	A	A	A	0 / 3	1–3	25%
Monte Carlo	A	A	A	A	A	A	A	A	A	A	1R	A	A	A	0 / 1	0–1	0%
Hamburg	A	A	A	A	A	A	A	A	A	1R	1R	A	A	A	0 / 2	0–2	0%
Rome Masters	A	A	A	A	A	A	A	A	A	A	1R	A	A	A	0 / 1	0–1	0%
Madrid	A	A	A	A	A	A	A	A	A	QF	A	1R	A	A	0 / 2	2–2	50%
Canada Masters	A	A	A	A	A	A	A	A	A	2R	A	A	A	A	0 / 1	1–1	50%
Cincinnati Masters	A	A	A	A	A	A	A	A	A	2R	2R	A	A	A	0 / 2	2–2	50%
Cincinnati Masters	A	A	A	A	A	A	A	A	A	2R	A	A	A	A	0 / 1	1–1	50%
Win–loss	0–0	0–0	0–0	0–0	0–0	0–0	0–0	0–0	0–1	6–7	2–6	0–1	0–0	0–0	0 / 15	8–15	35%

=== Mixed doubles ===
Tournament	2006	2007	2008	2009	2010	2011	SR	W–L	Win %
Grand Slam tournaments
Australian Open	A	1R	2R	A	A	A	0 / 2	1–2	33%
French Open	A	A	QF	A	A	A	0 / 1	2–1	67%
Wimbledon	2R	2R	1R	2R	A	2R	0 / 5	4–4	0%
US Open	1R	2R	2R	A	A	A	0 / 3	2–3	40%
Win–loss	1–2	2–3	4–4	1–0	0–0	1–1	0 / 11	9–10	47%

== ATP Career Finals ==
=== Doubles: 10 (5 titles, 5 runner-ups) ===
Legend (doubles) Grand Slam (0–0) ATP World Tour Finals (0–0) ATP Masters Series (0–0) ATP Championship Series (0–0) ATP World Series (5–5)	Finals by surface Hard (3–2) Clay (1–1) Grass (1–1) Carpet (0–1)	Finals by setting Outdoor (4–2) Indoor (1–3)

Result	W–L	Date	Tournament	Tier	Surface	Partner	Opponents	Score
Loss	0–1	Oct 2005	Lyon, France	International Series	Carpet	(South Africa) Jeff Coetzee	(France) Michaël Llodra (France) Fabrice Santoro	3–6, 1–6
Win	1–1	Jan 2006	Auckland, New Zealand	International Series	Hard	(Romania) Andrei Pavel	(Sweden) Simon Aspelin (Australia) Todd Perry	6–3, 5–7, [10–4]
Win	2–1	Jan 2007	Auckland, New Zealand	International Series	Hard	(South Africa) Jeff Coetzee	(Sweden) Simon Aspelin (South Africa) Chris Haggard	6–7^{(9–11)}, 6–3, [10–2]
Win	3–1	Jun 2007	's-Hertogenbosch, Netherlands	International Series	Grass	(South Africa) Jeff Coetzee	(Czech Republic) Martin Damm (India) Leander Paes	3–6, 7–6^{(7–5)}, [12–10]
Loss	3–2	Jul 2007	Amersfoort, Netherlands	International Series	Clay	(Netherlands) Robin Haase	(Argentina) Juan Pablo Brzezicki (Argentina) Juan Pablo Guzmán	2–6, 0–6
Loss	3–3	Mar 2008	Zagreb, Croatia	International Series	Hard	(Germany) Christopher Kas	(Australia) Paul Hanley (Australia) Jordan Kerr	3–6, 6–3, [8–10]
Win	4–3	Jul 2008	Amersfoort, Netherlands	International Series	Clay	(Czech Republic) František Čermák	(Netherlands) Jesse Huta Galung (Netherlands) Igor Sijsling	7–5, 7–5
Loss	4–4	Feb 2009	Zagreb, Croatia	250 Series	Hard	(Germany) Christopher Kas	(Czech Republic) Martin Damm (Sweden) Robert Lindstedt	4–6, 3–6
Loss	4–5	Jul 2009	Newport, United States	250 Series	Grass	(Germany) Michael Kohlmann	(Australia) Jordan Kerr (United States) Rajeev Ram	7–6^{(8–6)}, 6–7^{(7–9)}, [6–10]
Win	5–5	Mar 2010	Metz, France	250 Series	Hard	(Jamaica) Dustin Brown	(Brazil) Marcelo Melo (Brazil) Bruno Soares	6–3, 6–3

== ATP Challenger and ITF Futures finals ==
=== Singles: 9 (5–4) ===
Legend ATP Challenger (1–3) ITF Futures (4–1)	Finals by surface Hard (2–0) Clay (3–4) Grass (0–0) Carpet (0–0)

Result	W–L	Date	Tournament	Tier	Surface	Opponent	Score
Loss	0–1	Nov 1997	Guadalajara, Mexico	Challenger	Clay	(Morocco) Younes El Aynaoui	4–6, 7–6, 4–6
Loss	0–2	May 1998	Medellín, Colombia	Challenger	Clay	(Brazil) Adriano Ferreira	0–6, 4–6
Loss	0–3	Jun 1998	Oberstaufen, Germany	Challenger	Clay	(Austria) Wolfgang Schranz	4–6, 2–6
Win	1–3	Nov 1998	Toluca, Mexico	Challenger	Clay	(Argentina) Gastón Etlis	5–7, 6–1, 6–4
Win	2–3	Oct 1999	France F13, Nevers	Futures	Hard	(France) Jean-François Bachelot	3–6, 6–2, 6–4
Win	3–3	Nov 1999	Tunisia F2, Tunis	Futures	Clay	(Italy) Riccardo Ciruolo	5–7, 7–5, 6–0
Win	4–3	Apr 2001	Kuwait F2, Mishref	Futures	Hard	(Croatia) Mirko Pehar	6–1, 6–1
Win	5–3	May 2001	Austria F2, Telfs	Futures	Clay	(Sweden) Joachim Johansson	walkover
Loss	5–4	Jan 2003	El Salvador F1, San Salvador	Futures	Clay	(Argentina) Juan Pablo Brzezicki	3–6, 1–6

=== Doubles: 50 (27–23) ===
Legend ATP Challenger (22–19) ITF Futures (5–4)	Finals by surface Hard (10–9) Clay (17–14) Grass (0–0) Carpet (0–0)

Result	W–L	Date	Tournament	Tier	Surface	Partner	Opponents	Score
Loss	0–1	Aug 1996	Samarkand, Uzbekistan	Challenger	Clay	(Slovakia) Martin Hromec	(Puerto Rico) José Frontera (Uzbekistan) Oleg Ogorodov	3–6, 4–6
Loss	0–2	Nov 1997	Ixtapa, Mexico	Challenger	Hard	(Mexico) Bernardo Martínez	(South Africa) Chris Haggard (Venezuela) Maurice Ruah	4–6, 6–7
Loss	0–3	Dec 1997	Eilat, Israel	Challenger	Hard	(Netherlands) Sander Groen	(Germany) Patrick Baur (Russia) Andrei Cherkasov	3–6, 6–7
Loss	0–4	Jul 1998	Montauban, France	Challenger	Clay	(Netherlands) Edwin Kempes	(Spain) Eduardo Nicolás Espin (Spain) Germán Puentes Alcañiz	5–7, 5–7
Win	1–4	Jul 1998	Oberstaufen, Germany	Challenger	Clay	(Portugal) Nuno Marques	(Italy) Omar Camporese (Federal Republic of Yugoslavia) Dušan Vemić	7–6, 7–6
Loss	1–5	Sep 1998	Seville, Spain	Challenger	Clay	(Netherlands) Edwin Kempes	(Spain) Alberto Martín (Spain) Salvador Navarro	6–2, 5–7, 3–6
Loss	1–6	Nov 1998	Toluca, Mexico	Challenger	Clay	(Netherlands) Edwin Kempes	(Mexico) Alejandro Hernández (Mexico) Mariano Sánchez	3–6, 4–6
Loss	1–7	Jul 1999	Montauban, France	Challenger	Clay	(Lebanon) Ali Hamadeh	(Sweden) Simon Aspelin (Czech Republic) Ota Fukárek	3–6, 4–6
Win	2–7	Sep 2000	France F18, Mulhouse	Futures	Hard	(Finland) Ville Liukko	(South Africa) Shaun Rudman (South Africa) Wesley Moodie	7–5, 6–3
Win	3–7	Apr 2001	France F8, Saint-Brieuc	Futures	Clay	(Argentina) Cristian Kordasz	(France) Marc Gicquel (France) Régis Lavergne	6–4, 7–6^{(10–8)}
Loss	3–8	Apr 2001	Kuwait F1, Mishref	Futures	Hard	(Mauritius) Kamil Patel	(Czech Republic) Igor Brukner (Slovakia) Martin Hromec	4–6, 3–6
Win	4–8	Jun 2001	Germany F5, Trier	Futures	Clay	(Argentina) Cristian Kordasz	(Germany) Dirk Britzen (Germany) Bjorn Behles	6–1, 6–4
Win	5–8	Oct 2001	Bukhara, Uzbekistan	Challenger	Hard	(Pakistan) Aisam Qureshi	(Kazakhstan) Alexey Kedryuk (Belarus) Alexander Shvets	6–2, 6–4
Win	6–8	Oct 2001	Quito, Ecuador	Challenger	Clay	(Brazil) Ricardo Schlachter	(United States) Hugo Armando (Argentina) Diego del Río	6–7^{(8–10)}, 6–4, 7–6^{(9–7)}
Loss	6–9	Oct 2001	Colombia F2, Bogotá	Futures	Clay	(Argentina) Damián Furmanski	(Argentina) Patricio Rudi (Argentina) Gustavo Marcaccio	walkover
Loss	6–10	Apr 2002	USA F12, Tampa	Futures	Clay	(United States) Jason Marshall	(United States) Thomas Blake (United States) Levar Harper-Griffith	6–2, 4–6, 3–6
Win	7–10	Sep 2002	Samarkand, Uzbekistan	Challenger	Clay	(Argentina) Federico Browne	(Uzbekistan) Vadim Kutsenko (Uzbekistan) Oleg Ogorodov	3–6, 7–6^{(7–3)}, 7–6^{(7–3)}
Loss	7–11	Oct 2002	Seoul, South Korea	Challenger	Hard	(Argentina) Federico Browne	(Australia) Jaymon Crabb (New Zealand) Mark Nielsen	walkover
Loss	7–12	Dec 2002	Bangkok, Thailand	Challenger	Hard	(Argentina) Federico Browne	(Australia) Jaymon Crabb (Australia) Anthony Ross	walkover
Win	8–12	Jan 2003	São Paulo, Brazil	Challenger	Hard	(Argentina) Federico Browne	(Argentina) Ignacio Hirigoyen (Israel) Andy Ram	7–6^{(7–0)}, 7–6^{(7–3)}
Win	9–12	Mar 2003	Tasmania, Australia	Challenger	Hard	(Argentina) Federico Browne	(Australia) Alun Jones (Australia) Raphael Durek	1–6, 6–3, 6–2
Win	10–12	Apr 2003	Qatar F1, Doha	Futures	Hard	(France) Benjamin Cassaigne	(United Kingdom) Jonathan Marray (United Kingdom) David Sherwood	3–6, 7–6^{(8–6)}, 6–3
Win	11–12	Jun 2003	Reggio Emilia, Italy	Challenger	Clay	(Australia) Joseph Sirianni	(Italy) Alessio di Mauro (Italy) Vincenzo Santopadre	6–4, 6–4
Win	12–12	Jul 2003	Montauban, France	Challenger	Clay	(Netherlands) Fred Hemmes	(Argentina) Juan Pablo Guzmán (Argentina) Ignacio Hirigoyen	6–4, 6–4
Win	13–12	Aug 2003	Mönchengladbach, Germany	Challenger	Clay	(Georgia (country)) Irakli Labadze	(Germany) Karsten Braasch (Germany) Franz Stauder	6–7^{(4–7)}, 6–2, 6–2
Win	14–12	Sep 2003	Brașov, Romania	Challenger	Clay	(Austria) Alexander Peya	(Italy) Leonardo Azzaro (Italy) Stefano Galvani	6–2, 6–4
Win	15–12	Oct 2003	Reunion Island, Reunion	Challenger	Hard	(Argentina) Federico Browne	(Netherlands) Fred Hemmes (Netherlands) Peter Wessels	6–1, 6–7^{(4–7)}, 6–3
Loss	15–13	Dec 2003	Iran F3, Kish Island	Futures	Clay	(Austria) Johannes Ager	(Romania) Adrian Barbu (Romania) Gabriel Moraru	4–6, 6–4, 2–6
Loss	15–14	Feb 2004	Andrezieux, France	Challenger	Hard	(Austria) Alexander Peya	(Switzerland) Yves Allegro (France) Jean-François Bachelot	4–6, 7–5, 4–6
Win	16–14	Mar 2004	Besançon, France	Challenger	Hard	(Germany) Alexander Waske	(Denmark) Kenneth Carlsen (Belgium) Gilles Elseneer	3–6, 7–5, 6–3
Loss	16–15	Mar 2004	Mexico City, Mexico	Challenger	Clay	(Argentina) Federico Browne	(Australia) Ashley Fisher (United States) Tripp Phillips	4–6, 6–2, 3–6
Win	17–15	Apr 2004	San Luis Potosí, Mexico	Challenger	Clay	(Finland) Tuomas Ketola	(Mexico) Marcello Amador (Mexico) Jorge Haro	6–2, 6–2
Loss	17–16	May 2004	Aix-en-Provence, France	Challenger	Clay	(Argentina) Federico Browne	(France) Thierry Ascione (France) Jean-François Bachelot	4–6, 7–5, 4–6
Loss	17–17	Jul 2004	Zell, Germany	Challenger	Clay	(Austria) Werner Eschauer	(Germany) Alexander Waske (Switzerland) Jean-Claude Scherrer	6–4, 4–6, 3–6
Loss	17–18	Aug 2004	Manerbio, Italy	Challenger	Clay	(Sweden) Johan Landsberg	(Czech Republic) Martin Štěpánek (Czech Republic) Petr Luxa	4–6, 2–6
Win	18–18	Nov 2004	Groningen, Netherlands	Challenger	Hard	(Germany) Alexander Waske	(Netherlands) Romano Frantzen (Netherlands) Floris Kilian	6–1, 6–2
Win	19–18	Dec 2004	Kish Island, Iran	Challenger	Clay	(Germany) Tomas Behrend	(Poland) Adam Chadaj (Poland) Filip Urban	3–6, 6–2, 6–4
Loss	19–19	May 2005	Prague, Czech Republic	Challenger	Clay	(United States) Travis Parrott	(Australia) Jordan Kerr (Argentina) Sebastián Prieto	4–6, 3–6
Win	20–19	Aug 2005	Manerbio, Italy	Challenger	Clay	(Netherlands) Melle van Gemerden	(Austria) Daniel Köllerer (Austria) Oliver Marach	6–3, 6–4
Win	21–19	Oct 2005	Southampton, United Kingdom	Challenger	Hard	(South Africa) Melle van Gemerden	(United States) Travis Parrott (United States) Tripp Phillips	6–7^{(8–10)}, 6–4, [10–4]
Loss	21–20	Nov 2005	Luxembourg, Luxembourg	Challenger	Hard	(Sweden) Robert Lindstedt	(United States) Eric Butorac (United States) Chris Drake	6–4, 3–6, 4–6
Win	22–20	Apr 2006	Mexico City, Mexico	Challenger	Clay	(United States) Tripp Phillips	(Germany) Michael Kohlmann (Germany) Alexander Waske	6–7^{(4–7)}, 6–4, [13–11]
Win	23–20	Oct 2006	Kolding, Denmark	Challenger	Hard	(South Africa) Jeff Coetzee	(United States) Travis Parrott (United States) Eric Butorac	4–6, 6–4, [10–5]
Loss	23–21	Mar 2009	Sarajevo, Bosnia & Herzegovina	Challenger	Hard	(United Kingdom) James Auckland	(Russia) Konstantin Kravchuk (Poland) Dawid Olejniczak	2–6, 6–3, [7–10]
Loss	23–22	Jul 2009	Poznań, Poland	Challenger	Clay	(Germany) Michael Kohlmann	(Argentina) Sergio Roitman (France) Alexandre Sidorenko	4–6, 4–6
Loss	23–23	Nov 2009	Astana, Kazakhstan	Challenger	Hard	(United States) David Martin	(United Kingdom) Jonathan Marray (United Kingdom) Jamie Murray	6–4, 3–6, [5–10]
Win	24–23	Aug 2010	Cordenons, Italy	Challenger	Clay	(Netherlands) Robin Haase	(Canada) Adil Shamasdin (United States) James Cerretani	7–6^{(16–14)}, 7–5
Win	25–23	Aug 2010	Kitzbühel, Austria	Challenger	Clay	(Jamaica) Dustin Brown	(Chile) Hans Podlipnik Castillo (Austria) Max Raditschnigg	3–6, 7–5, [10–7]
Win	26–23	Sep 2010	Szczecin, Poland	Challenger	Clay	(Jamaica) Dustin Brown	(Australia) Rameez Junaid (Germany) Philipp Marx	6–4, 7–5
Win	27–23	Aug 2013	Germany F12, Wetzlar	Futures	Clay	(Netherlands) Wesley Koolhof	(Germany) Lars Pörschke (Germany) Julian Lenz	3–6, 6–0, [10–7]
