= Werner Eschauer =

Austrian tennis player

- Country (sports): Austria
- Residence: Hollenstein an der Ybbs, Austria
- Born: 26 April 1974 (age 52) Hollenstein an der Ybbs, Austria
- Height: 1.87 m (6 ft 2 in)
- Turned pro: 1998
- Retired: 2012
- Plays: Right-handed (two-handed backhand)
- Prize money: $703,735

Singles
- Career record: 15–41
- Career titles: 0
- Highest ranking: No. 52 (27 August 2007)

Grand Slam singles results
- Australian Open: 1R (2008)
- French Open: 2R (2000, 2007)
- Wimbledon: 2R (2007)
- US Open: 1R (2003, 2007)

Doubles
- Career record: 7–10
- Career titles: 0
- Highest ranking: No. 120 (14 April 2008)

Grand Slam doubles results
- Australian Open: 2R (2008)
- US Open: 2R (2007)
- Last updated on: 22 August 2021.

Werner Eschauer (born 26 April 1974) is an Austrian former professional tennis player.

== Tennis career ==
In his first 12 years as a pro, Eschauer found little success, winning just 7 ATP-level matches and cracking the top-100 for just a few weeks in late 2003, peaking at No. 96.

In 2007 however, at the age of 33, Eschauer cracked the top 100 in April and reached World No. 52 in August. He won 7 ATP-level matches in 2007 to match his total from the previous 12 years and won 4 matches at the Dutch Open in July to reach his first ATP final, including a win over Carlos Moyá in the quarters. He then lost to Steve Darcis, another first-time finalist.

Eschauer's most notable match likely was playing Rafael Nadal on Centre Court at Wimbledon in the 2nd round in June 2007. ESPN's Chris Fowler reported during coverage of this event that when searching for a left-handed player to practice against as a warm-up for the left-handed Nadal, Eschauer ended up facing off against John McEnroe. Fowler described Eschauer as coming from a modest background, and stated that he did not receive support from the Tennis Federation.

== ATP career finals ==
=== Singles: 1 (1 runner-up) ===
Legend Grand Slam tournaments (0–0) ATP World Tour Finals (0–0) ATP World Tour Masters 1000 (0–0) ATP World Tour 500 Series (0–0) ATP World Tour 250 Series (0–1)	Titles by surface Hard (0–0) Clay (0–1) Grass (0–0) Carpet (0–0)	Titles by setting Outdoor (0–1) Indoor (0–0)

Result	W–L	Date	Tournament	Tier	Surface	Opponent	Score
Loss	0–1	Jul 2007	Amersfoort, Netherlands	250 Series	Clay	(Belgium) Steve Darcis	1–6, 6–7^{(1—7)}

=== Doubles: 1 (1 runner-up) ===
Legend Grand Slam tournaments (0–0) ATP World Tour Finals (0–0) ATP World Tour Masters 1000 (0–0) ATP World Tour 500 Series (0–0) ATP World Tour 250 Series (0–1)	Titles by surface Hard (0–0) Clay (0–1) Grass (0–0) Carpet (0–0)	Titles by setting Outdoor (0–1) Indoor (0–0)

Result	W–L	Date	Tournament	Tier	Surface	Partner	Opponenta	Score
Loss	0–1	Feb 2008	Buenos Aires, Argentina	250 Series	Clay	(Australia) Peter Luczak	(Argentina) Agustín Calleri (Peru) Luis Horna	0–6, 7–6^{(8–6)}, [2–10]

== ATP Challenger and ITF Futures finals ==
=== Singles: 23 (13–10) ===
Legend ATP Challenger (10–8) ITF Futures (3–2)	Finals by surface Hard (2–1) Clay (11–8) Grass (0–0) Carpet (0–1)

Result	W–L	Date	Tournament	Tier	Surface	Opponent	Score
Win	1–0	Jul 1999	Austria F3, Schwaz	Futures	Clay	(Austria) Alexander Peya	7–6, 6–3
Loss	1–1	Sep 1999	Budapest, Hungary	Challenger	Clay	(France) Stephane Huet	3–6, 5–7
Loss	1–2	Oct 1999	Italy F17, Sardinia	Futures	Hard	(Italy) Elia Grossi	4–6, 6–0, 4–6
Win	2–2	Oct 2000	Tangier, Morocco	Challenger	Clay	(France) Nicolas Thomann	6–4, 6–3
Loss	2–3	Jul 2001	Budaors, Hungary	Challenger	Clay	(Argentina) Juan Ignacio Chela	5–7, 1–6
Loss	2–4	Sep 2002	Sofia, Bulgaria	Challenger	Clay	(Germany) Tomas Behrend	0–6, 2–6
Cancelled	2–4	Sep 2002	Banja Luka, Bosnia & Herzegovina	Challenger	Clay	(Germany) Tomas Behrend	Abandoned
Win	3–4	Oct 2002	Seoul, South Korea	Challenger	Hard	(Russia) Igor Kunitsyn	6–2, ret.
Loss	3–5	Apr 2003	Sanremo, Italy	Challenger	Clay	(Germany) Tomas Behrend	4–6, 2–6
Win	4–5	Jul 2003	Braunschweig, Germany	Challenger	Clay	(Russia) Igor Kunitsyn	6–1, 7–6^{(7–2)}
Loss	4–6	Sep 2004	Banja Luka, Bosnia & Herzegovina	Challenger	Clay	(Russia) Yuri Schukin	6–7^{(3–7)}, 6–7^{(7–9)}
Win	5–6	Aug 2005	Genevsa, Switzerland	Challenger	Clay	(Argentina) Damián Patriarca	6–3, 6–1
Loss	5–7	Jan 2006	Austria F2, Bergheim	Futures	Carpet	(Slovakia) Lukáš Lacko	6–3, 1–6, 5–7
Win	6–7	Mar 2006	Italy F5, Caltanissetta	Futures	Clay	(Romania) Victor Crivoi	6–3, 2–6, 6–2
Win	7–7	Mar 2006	Italy F6, Catania	Futures	Clay	(Spain) Pablo Andújar	6–3, 6–3
Win	8–7	Apr 2006	Chiasso, Switzerland	Challenger	Clay	(Germany) Simon Greul	6–1, 6–2
Loss	8–8	Apr 2006	Bergamo, Italy	Challenger	Clay	(France) Nicolas Devilder	6–1, 5–7, 4–6
Loss	8–9	Jul 2006	Rimini, Italy	Challenger	Clay	(Spain) Pablo Andújar	6–3, 1–6, 5–7
Win	9–9	Sep 2006	Kranj, Slovenia	Challenger	Clay	(Spain) Gorka Fraile	6–1, 6–0
Win	10–9	Feb 2007	Wrocław, Poland	Challenger	Hard	(Czech Republic) Tomáš Zíb	5–7, 6–4, 6–4
Loss	10–10	Mar 2007	Barletta, Italy	Challenger	Clay	(Argentina) Carlos Berlocq	6–3, 6–7^{(7–9)}, 0–2 ret.
Win	11–10	Apr 2007	Monza, Italy	Challenger	Clay	(Czech Republic) Jan Hájek	6–0, 3–0 ret.
Win	12–10	Apr 2007	Chiasso, Switzerland	Challenger	Clay	(Germany) Michael Berrer	6–3, 6–2
Win	13–10	Jun 2007	Lugano, Switzerland	Challenger	Clay	(Czech Republic) Jiří Vaněk	6–4, 4–6, 7–6^{(7–2)}

=== Doubles: 17 (6–11) ===
Legend ATP Challenger (2–7) ITF Futures (4–4)	Finals by surface Hard (3–1) Clay (2–9) Grass (0–0) Carpet (1–1)

Result	W–L	Date	Tournament	Tier	Surface	Partner	Opponents	Score
Win	1–0	Oct 1999	Italy F17, Sardinia	Futures	Hard	(Austria) Wolfgang Schranz	(Italy) Daniele Ceraudo (Italy) Elia Grossi	6–3, 6–4
Win	2–0	Oct 1999	Italy F18, Selargius	Futures	Hard	(Austria) Wolfgang Schranz	(Italy) Omar Camporese (Italy) Elia Grossi	6–2, 4–1 ret.
Loss	2–1	Mar 2004	Cagliari, Italy	Challenger	Clay	(Austria) Daniel Köllerer	(Germany) Tomas Behrend (Italy) Giorgio Galimberti	2–6, 1–6
Loss	2–2	Jul 2004	Zell, Germany	Challenger	Clay	(Netherlands) Rogier Wassen	(Switzerland) Jean-Claude Scherrer (Germany) Alexander Waske	6–4, 4–6, 3–6
Loss	2–3	Aug 2004	Geneva, Switzerland	Challenger	Clay	(Austria) Herbert Wiltschnig	(Czech Republic) Tomáš Cibulec (Czech Republic) David Škoch	2–6, 4–6
Win	3–3	Oct 2004	Rome, Italy	Challenger	Clay	(Romania) Florin Mergea	(Italy) Francesco Aldi (Italy) Francesco Piccari	6–7^{(5–7)}, 6–3, 6–0
Loss	3–4	Apr 2005	Canberra, Australia	Challenger	Clay	(Greece) Vasilis Mazarakis	(Australia) Richard Fromberg (Australia) Chris Guccione	1–6, 2–6
Loss	3–5	Jul 2005	Oberstaufen, Germany	Challenger	Clay	(Germany) Christopher Kas	(Switzerland) Jean-Claude Scherrer (Austria) Oliver Marach	5–7, 3–6
Loss	3–6	Jul 2005	Austria F5, Anif	Futures	Clay	(Austria) Marko Neunteibl	(Switzerland) Fabian Roetschi (Switzerland) Benjamin-David Rufer	6–7^{(5–7)}, 4–6
Win	4–6	Nov 2005	Puebla, Mexico	Challenger	Hard	(Germany) Alexander Satschko	(Mexico) Santiago González (Mexico) Alejandro Hernández	6–1, 6–4
Loss	4–7	Jan 2006	Austria F1, Bergheim	Futures	Carpet	(Germany) Christopher Kas	(Sweden) Johan Brunström (United States) Philip Stolt	3–6, 4–6
Win	5–7	Jan 2006	Austria F2, Bergheim	Futures	Carpet	(Romania) Florin Mergea	(Bulgaria) Todor Enev (Bulgaria) Ilia Kushev	6–2, 6–3
Loss	5–8	Feb 2008	Wrocław, Poland	Challenger	Hard	(Austria) Jürgen Melzer	(United States) James Cerretani (Czech Republic) Lukáš Rosol	7–6^{(9–7)}, 3–6, [7–10]
Loss	5–9	Jun 2008	Braunschweig, Germany	Challenger	Clay	(Austria) Philipp Oswald	(Italy) Marco Crugnola (Spain) Oscar Hernandez Perez	6–7^{(4–7)}, 2–6
Win	6–9	Apr 2009	Croatia F5, Vrsar	Futures	Clay	(Austria) Herbert Wiltschnig	(Germany) Bastian Knittel (Austria) Max Raditschnigg	7–5, 6–3
Loss	6–10	Nov 2009	Turkey F11, Antalya	Futures	Clay	(Austria) Marco Mirnegg	(Romania) Llaurentiu-Ady Gavrila (Romania) Andrei Mlendea	6–7^{(6–8)}, 3–6
Loss	6–11	Nov 2009	Turkey F12, Antalya	Futures	Clay	(Germany) Alexander Flock	(Bulgaria) Tihomir Grozdanov (Bulgaria) Dinko Halachev	6–4, 2–6, [7–10]

== Performance timeline ==
Key
W	F	SF	QF	#R	RR	Q#	P#	DNQ	A	Z#	PO	G	S	B	NMS	NTI	P	NH

(W) winner; (F) finalist; (SF) semifinalist; (QF) quarterfinalist; (#R) rounds 4, 3, 2, 1; (RR) round-robin stage; (Q#) qualification round; (P#) preliminary round; (DNQ) did not qualify; (A) absent; (Z#) Davis/Fed Cup Zonal Group (with number indication) or (PO) play-off; (G) gold, (S) silver or (B) bronze Olympic/Paralympic medal; (NMS) not a Masters tournament; (NTI) not a Tier I tournament; (P) postponed; (NH) not held; (SR) strike rate (events won / competed); (W–L) win–loss record.
To avoid confusion and double counting, these charts are updated at the conclusion of a tournament or when the player's participation has ended.

=== Singles ===
Tournament	2000	2001	2002	2003	2004	2005	2006	2007	2008	SR	W–L	Win %
Grand Slam tournaments
Australian Open	Q1	Q2	Q1	Q2	Q3	A	A	A	1R	0 / 1	0–1	0%
French Open	2R	Q2	Q3	Q1	Q1	Q1	Q2	2R	Q1	0 / 2	2–2	50%
Wimbledon	1R	A	Q1	A	A	Q1	A	2R	A	0 / 2	1–2	33%
US Open	A	Q1	A	1R	A	A	A	1R	A	0 / 2	0–2	0%
Win–loss	1–2	0–0	0–0	0–1	0–0	0–0	0–0	2–3	0–1	0 / 7	3–7	30%
ATP World Tour Masters 1000
Indian Wells	A	A	A	A	A	A	A	A	1R	0 / 1	0–1	0%
Monte Carlo	A	A	A	Q2	A	A	A	A	A	0 / 0	0–0	–
Win–loss	0–0	0–0	0–0	0–0	0–0	0–0	0–0	0–0	0–1	0 / 1	0–1	0%
