= Tomas Behrend =

German tennis player

Tomas Ugo Behrend
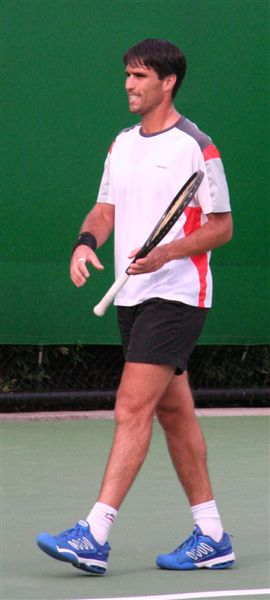
- Country (sports): Germany
- Residence: Alsdorf, Germany
- Born: 12 December 1974 (age 51) Porto Alegre, Brazil
- Height: 1.93 m (6 ft 4 in)
- Turned pro: 1994
- Plays: Right-handed (one-handed backhand)
- Prize money: $977,352

Singles
- Career record: 42–74
- Career titles: 0
- Highest ranking: No. 74 (3 October 2005)

Grand Slam singles results
- Australian Open: 2R (2000)
- French Open: 2R (2005)
- Wimbledon: 1R (2003, 2005)
- US Open: 1R (2003, 2005)

Doubles
- Career record: 6–9
- Career titles: 0
- Highest ranking: No. 43 (15 October 2007)

Tomas Ugo Behrend (born 12 December 1974) is a German former professional tennis player. His career high ATP singles ranking was World No. 74, which he attained in October 2005. His career high in doubles was World No. 43 in October 2007.

Behrend retired in 2007 and said he regrets never having the opportunity to have played Andre Agassi before he retired. Behrend has opened up a tennis academy in his hometown of Alsdorf called ToBe.

== Early life and change of nationality ==
Behrend is of German descent and was born in Porto Alegre and raised in Novo Hamburgo where his father Claudio who was a volleyball player owns and runs a graphic and printing company. He started playing tennis at the age of five and in addition to playing tennis as a youngster he swam and played football, handball and volleyball before focusing on tennis. Behrend has three brothers and is a fan of the Gremio and Borussia Dortmund football teams.

In 1991 Behrend went to Germany at the age of 17 to play club tennis, through his German background he was able obtain a German passport which made it easier for travel and financially more lucrative for him to represent Germany than Brazil, at time as a Brazilian player, he would have been taxed at 45% of his prize money.

== Career ==
Behrend won his first Futures and Challenger title in 1998, while he did not have great success on the main tour. He managed to hold both positive head-to-head records against two former world number ones Carlos Moyá who he defeated twice when Moya was in the top 10, one of them in his country of birth and the other win in his adopted country and Juan Carlos Ferrero who he defeated at Palermo in 2005 which was where he had his best tournament result on the ATP tour reaching the semi-finals losing to Filippo Volandri.

2003 was Behrend's best year in singles and there were calls for Behrend to play Davis Cup for Brazil, but this avenue was closed when Behrend was selected to play for Germany at the age of 28 against Belarus. He lost his only Davis Cup match to Max Mirnyi 5–7, 2–6, 7–6^{(6)}, 6–2, 6–4. In spite of the loss Behrend said " To represent a nation in the World Group of Davis Cup is the dream for any player and at 28, perhaps this was my last chance".

On the subject of representing Germany and not Brazil. Behrend believes that there was no opportunity for him at the start of his career to become a professional in Brazil and in Germany he was able to receive financial assistance. He had always wanted to be called up by Brazil, but was upset at the politics behind the scenes, when it came to the fourth player, given that Gustavo Kuerten, Fernando Meligeni and Flávio Saretta were all fit, then they were selected and the often the fourth member was ranked behind him in the rankings, therefore "I am a Brazilian with a German passport".

== Singles titles ==
Legend (singles)
Grand Slam (0)
ATP Masters Series (0)
ATP Tour (0)
Challengers (7)
Futures (1)

No.	Date	Tournament	Surface	Opponent	Score
1.	1998	Germany F13	Clay	(Morocco) Mehdi Tahiri	6–3, 7–6
2.	1998	Budva	Clay	(Sweden) Fredrik Jonsson	3–6, 6–3, 6–2
3.	2002	Sofia	Clay	(Austria) Werner Eschauer	6–0, 6–3
4.	2003	San Remo	Clay	(Austria) Werner Eschauer	6–4, 6–2
5.	2003	Weiden	Clay	(Germany) Björn Phau	2–6, 6–4, 6–1
6.	2004	Kish Island	Clay	(France) Mathieu Montcourt	7–6^{(7–3)}, 6–1
7.	2005	Santiago	Clay	(Chile) Adrián García	7–6^{(7–3)}, 4–6, 6–2
8.	2005	Olbia	Clay	(Italy) Alessio di Mauro	6–4, 7–6^{(7–3)}
