= Alberto Martín =

Spanish tennis player (born 1978)

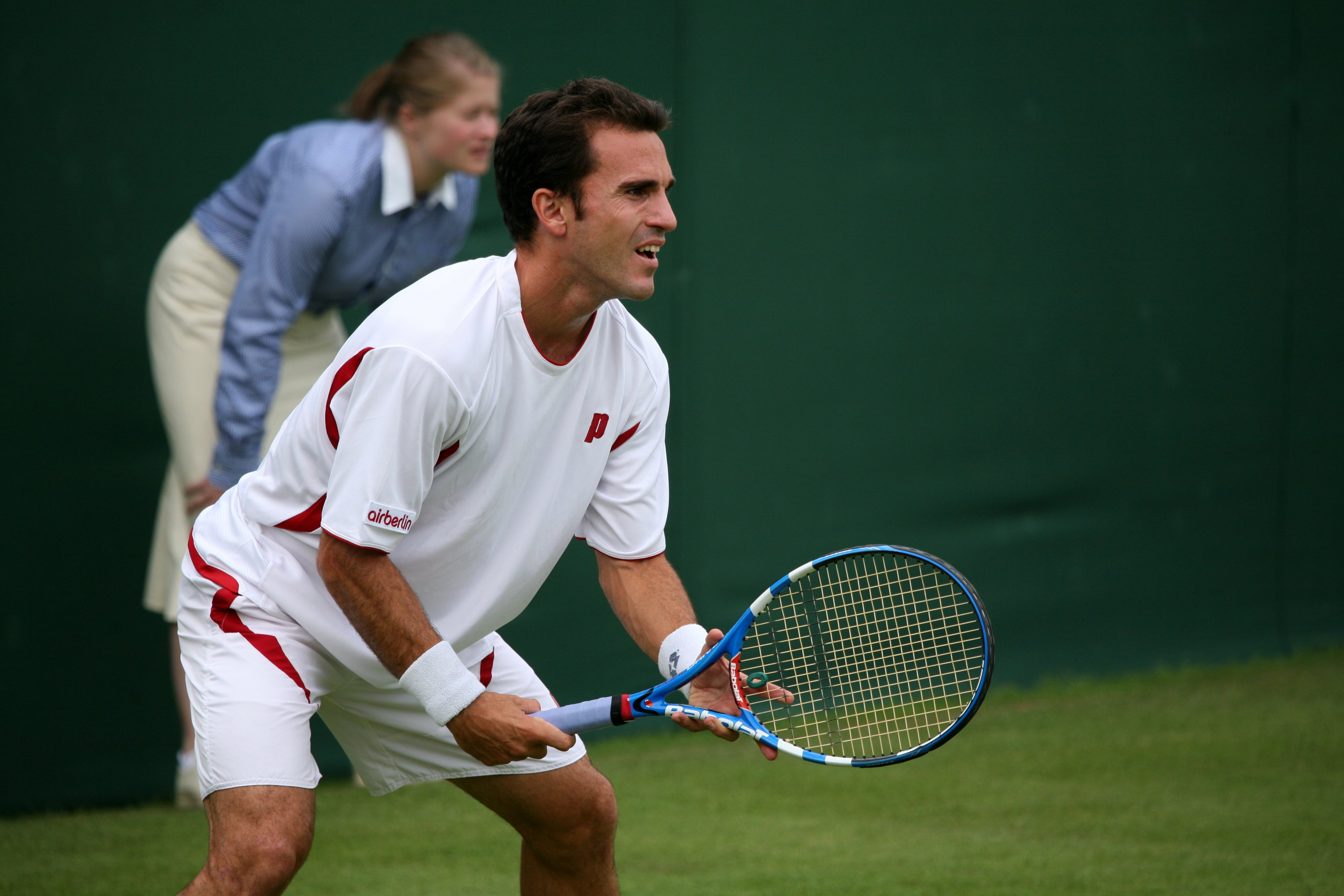
- Country (sports): Spain
- Born: 20 August 1978 (age 48) Barcelona, Spain
- Height: 1.75 m (5 ft 9 in)
- Turned pro: 1995
- Retired: 29 July 2010
- Plays: Right-handed (one-handed backhand)
- Prize money: $3,840,885

Singles
- Career record: 218–269
- Career titles: 3
- Highest ranking: No. 34 (1 June 2001)

Grand Slam singles results
- Australian Open: 3R (2002, 2003)
- French Open: 4R (2006)
- Wimbledon: 3R (1999)
- US Open: 3R (2003)

Doubles
- Career record: 90–131
- Career titles: 3
- Highest ranking: No. 64 (2 October 2000)

Grand Slam doubles results
- Australian Open: 2R (2001, 2002, 2004, 2007)
- French Open: QF (2006)
- Wimbledon: 2R (2000)
- US Open: 2R (2004)

Team competitions
- Davis Cup: W (2004)
- Last updated on: 27 May 2021.

Alberto Martín Magret (Spanish pronunciation: [alˈβeɾto maɾˈtim maˈɣɾet]; (Note: In isolation, Martín is pronounced [maɾˈtin].) born 20 August 1978) is a retired tennis player from Spain. He won three singles titles and reached five Masters Series quarterfinals on clay.

== Tennis career ==
Martín turned professional in 1995. He won three singles titles and achieved a career-high singles ranking of world No. 34 in June 2001.

His best Grand Slam performance was reaching the fourth round of Roland Garros in 2006. En route to this performance, Martín's first-round win was his first victory over former world No. 1, Andy Roddick, in their fifth encounter. Martín led by two sets when Roddick retired with an ankle injury. Martín also beat No. 1 seed, Lleyton Hewitt, in the first round of the 2002 Australian Open, though Hewitt was recovering from chickenpox at the time of his victory.

Martín suffered the heaviest defeat in the history of the Australian Open. Andy Murray beat him in the first round of the 2007 tournament, 6–0, 6–0, 6–1. Martín had to wait until the penultimate game of the match before winning his only game.

In 2004, Martín was a member of the victorious Spain Davis Cup team for the Davis Cup first round against Czech Republic in Brno, although he did not play.

In 2017, he was a member of the victorious H30 Team of TV Ober-Eschbach which got promoted to the Bezirks-Oberliga (HTV) in 2018.

== Personal life ==
He studied psychology at the University of Barcelona and graduated with a master's degree from Universidad Nacional de Educación a Distancia.

== ATP Tour career finals ==
=== Singles: 5 (3 titles, 2 runner-ups) ===
Legend Grand Slam tournaments (0–0) ATP World Tour Finals (0–0) ATP World Tour Masters 1000 (0–0) ATP World Tour 500 Series (0–0) ATP 250 Series (3–2)	Finals by surface Hard (0–0) Clay (3–2) Grass (0–0)	Finals by setting Outdoor (3–2) Indoor (0–0)

Result	W–L	Date	Tournament	Tier	Surface	Opponent	Score
Win	1–0	Mar 1999	Grand Prix Hassan II, Morocco	World Series	Clay	(Spain) Fernando Vicente	6–3, 6–4
Win	2–0	Oct 1999	Bucharest, Romania	World Series	Clay	(Morocco) Karim Alami	6–2, 6–3
Win	3–0	May 2001	Majorca Open, Spain	World Series	Clay	(Argentina) Guillermo Coria	6–3, 3–6, 6–2
Loss	3–1	Feb 2005	Brasil Open, Brazil	International Series	Clay	(Spain) Rafael Nadal	0–6, 7–6^{(7–2)}, 1–6
Loss	3–2	Feb 2006	Brasil Open, Brazil	International Series	Clay	(Chile) Nicolás Massú	3–6, 4–6

=== Doubles: 6 (3 titles, 3 runner-ups) ===
Legend Grand Slam tournaments (0–0) ATP World Tour Finals (0–0) ATP World Tour Masters 1000 (0–0) ATP World Tour 500 Series (0–0) ATP World Tour 250 Series (3–3)	Titles by surface Hard (0–0) Clay (3–3) Grass (0–0)	Titles by setting Outdoor (3–3) Indoor (0–0)

Result	W–L	Date	Tournament	Tier	Surface	Partner	Opponents	Score
Loss	0–1	Sep 1997	Brighton International, United Kingdom	World Series	Clay	(United Kingdom) Chris Wilkinson	(United States) Kent Kinnear (North Macedonia) Aleksandar Kitinov	6–7^{(7–9)}, 2–6
Loss	0–2	Oct 1999	Palermo, Italy	World Series	Clay	(South Africa) Lan Bale	(Argentina) Mariano Hood (Argentina) Sebastián Prieto	3–6, 1–6
Loss	0–3	May 2000	Majorca Open, Spain	World Series	Clay	(Spain) Fernando Vicente	(France) Michaël Llodra (Italy) Diego Nargiso	6–7^{(2–7)}, 6–7^{(3–7)}
Win	1–3	Sep 2000	Bucharest, Romania	World Series	Clay	(Israel) Eyal Ran	(United States) Devin Bowen (Argentina) Mariano Hood	7–6^{(7–4)}, 6–1
Win	2–3	Jul 2006	Dutch Open, Netherlands	World Series	Clay	(Spain) Fernando Vicente	(Argentina) Lucas Arnold Ker (Germany) Christopher Kas	6–4, 6–3
Win	3–3	Feb 2009	Buenos Aires, Argentina	250 Series	Clay	(Spain) Marcel Granollers	(Spain) Nicolás Almagro (Spain) Santiago Ventura	6–3, 5–7, [10–8]

== ATP Challenger and ITF Futures finals ==
=== Singles: 14 (5–9) ===
Legend ATP Challenger (5–9) ITF Futures (0–0)	Finals by surface Hard (0–2) Clay (5–7) Grass (0–0) Carpet (0–0)

Result	W–L	Date	Tournament	Tier	Surface	Opponent	Score
Loss	0–1	Aug 1997	Geneva, Switzerland	Challenger	Clay	(Italy) Andrea Gaudenzi	2–6, 1–6
Win	1–1	Sep 1998	Seville, Spain	Challenger	Clay	(Italy) Davide Scala	6–1, 5–7, 6–2
Loss	1–2	Oct 1998	Cairo, Egypt	Challenger	Clay	(Spain) Albert Portas	2–6, 6–1, 3–6
Loss	1–3	Nov 1998	Buenos Aires, Argentina	Challenger	Clay	(Morocco) Younes El Aynaoui	6–7, 1–6
Loss	1–4	Mar 1999	Singapore, Singapore	Challenger	Hard	(Italy) Mosé Navarra	2–6, 2–6
Loss	1–5	Jun 2000	Szczecin, Poland	Challenger	Clay	(Czech Republic) Bohdan Ulihrach	0–6, 2–6
Loss	1–6	Sep 2005	Szczecin, Poland	Challenger	Clay	(Argentina) Agustín Calleri	6–4, 2–6, 4–6
Loss	1–7	Mar 2006	Sunrise, United States	Challenger	Hard	(Russia) Dmitry Tursunov	3–6, 1–6
Win	2–7	Oct 2007	Tarragona, Spain	Challenger	Clay	(Australia) Peter Luczak	6–4, 7–5
Loss	2–8	Apr 2008	Monza, Italy	Challenger	Clay	(Spain) Albert Montañés	6–3, 6–7^{(1–7)}, 3–6
Loss	2–9	Apr 2008	Chiasso, Switzerland	Challenger	Clay	(Morocco) Younes El Aynaoui	6–7^{(2–7)}, 3–6
Win	3–9	Sep 2008	Trnava, Slovakia	Challenger	Clay	(Germany) Julian Reister	6–2, 6–0
Win	4–9	Oct 2008	Tarragona, Spain	Challenger	Clay	(Germany) Simon Greul	6–7^{(5–7)}, 6–4, 6–4
Win	5–9	Sep 2009	Genova, Italy	Challenger	Clay	(Argentina) Carlos Berlocq	6–3, 6–3

=== Doubles: 19 (7–12) ===
Legend ATP Challenger (7–12) ITF Futures (0–0)	Finals by surface Hard (0–0) Clay (7–12) Grass (0–0) Carpet (0–0)

Result	W–L	Date	Tournament	Tier	Surface	Partner	Opponents	Score
Loss	0–1	Apr 1997	Barletta, Italy	Challenger	Clay	(Spain) Albert Portas	(Belgium) Tom Vanhoudt (Portugal) Nuno Marques	3–6, 4–6
Loss	0–2	Aug 1997	Graz, Austria	Challenger	Clay	(Spain) Albert Portas	(Belgium) Tom Vanhoudt (Argentina) Lucas Arnold Ker	1–6, 2–6
Loss	0–3	Apr 1998	Espinho, Portugal	Challenger	Clay	(Czech Republic) Tomas Anzari	(Germany) Jens Knippschild (Netherlands) Stephen Noteboom	6–7, 5–7
Loss	0–4	May 1998	Ljubljana, Slovenia	Challenger	Clay	(Czech Republic) Tomas Anzari	(South Africa) Marius Barnard (Netherlands) Stephen Noteboom	6–7, 7–6, 6–7
Loss	0–5	Jun 1998	Split, Croatia	Challenger	Clay	(Spain) Álex López Morón	(United States) Geoff Grant (Hungary) Attila Sávolt	6–4, 3–6, 2–6
Win	1–5	Sep 1998	Seville, Spain	Challenger	Clay	(Spain) Salvador Navarro-Gutierrez	(Netherlands) Edwin Kempes (Netherlands) Rogier Wassen	2–6, 7–5, 6–3
Loss	1–6	Oct 1998	Cairo, Egypt	Challenger	Clay	(Spain) Salvador Navarro-Gutierrez	(Spain) Albert Portas (Spain) Álex López Morón	6–4, 3–6, 2–6
Loss	1–7	Nov 1998	Buenos Aires, Argentina	Challenger	Clay	(Spain) Salvador Navarro-Gutierrez	(Argentina) Martin Garcia (Argentina) Guillermo Cañas	7–6, 1–6, 4–6
Loss	1–8	Oct 1999	Barcelona, Spain	Challenger	Clay	(Spain) Javier Sánchez	(Spain) Eduardo Nicolás Espin (Spain) Germán Puentes Alcañiz	6–7, 6–7
Win	2–8	Jun 2000	Prostějov, Czech Republic	Challenger	Clay	(Israel) Eyal Ran	(Czech Republic) Petr Luxa (Italy) Vincenzo Santopadre	6–2, 6–2
Win	3–8	Jun 2000	Szczecin, Poland	Challenger	Clay	(Israel) Eyal Ran	(Argentina) Martín Rodríguez (Argentina) Mariano Hood	7–6^{(7–2)}, 6–7^{(5–7)}, 6–2
Loss	3–9	Sep 2004	Szczecin, Poland	Challenger	Clay	(Spain) Óscar Hernández	(Argentina) Lucas Arnold Ker (Argentina) Mariano Hood	0–6, 4–6
Loss	3–10	Aug 2007	Manerbio, Portugal	Challenger	Clay	(Portugal) Fred Gil	(Netherlands) Antal van der Duim (Netherlands) Boy Westerhof	6–7^{(4–7)}, 6–3, [8–10]
Win	4–10	Mar 2008	Meknes, Morocco	Challenger	Clay	(Spain) Daniel Munoz De La Nava	(Russia) Yuri Schukin (Russia) Mikhail Elgin	6–4, 6–7^{(2–7)}, [10–6]
Win	5–10	Apr 2008	Monza, Italy	Challenger	Clay	(Italy) Stefano Galvani	(Germany) Denis Gremelmayr (Germany) Simon Greul	7–5, 2–6, [10–3]
Win	6–10	Apr 2008	Chiasso, Switzerland	Challenger	Clay	(Argentina) Mariano Hood	(Italy) Fabio Colangelo (Italy) Marco Crugnola	4–6, 7–6^{(7–4)}, [11–9]
Loss	6–11	Jul 2008	Poznań, Poland	Challenger	Clay	(Colombia) Santiago Giraldo	(Sweden) Johan Brunström (Netherlands Antilles) Jean-Julien Rojer	6–4, 0–6, [6–10]
Win	7–11	Aug 2008	Como, Italy	Challenger	Clay	(Argentina) Mariano Hood	(Chile) Guillermo Hormazábal (Croatia) Antonio Veić	6–1, 6–4
Loss	7–12	Mar 2009	Marrakesh, Morocco	Challenger	Clay	(Spain) Daniel Munoz De La Nava	(Spain) Rubén Ramírez Hidalgo (Spain) Santiago Ventura	3–6, 6–7^{(5–7)}

== Performance timelines ==
Key
W	F	SF	QF	#R	RR	Q#	DNQ	A	NH

(W) winner; (F) finalist; (SF) semifinalist; (QF) quarterfinalist; (#R) rounds 4, 3, 2, 1; (RR) round-robin stage; (Q#) qualification round; (DNQ) did not qualify; (A) absent; (NH) not held; (SR) strike rate (events won / competed); (W–L) win–loss record.

=== Singles ===
Tournament	1996	1997	1998	1999	2000	2001	2002	2003	2004	2005	2006	2007	2008	2009	2010	SR	W–L	Win %
Australian Open	Q1	A	1R	1R	1R	2R	3R	3R	2R	1R	A	1R	Q2	1R	A	0 / 10	6–10	38%
French Open	A	1R	Q3	1R	1R	2R	2R	1R	1R	1R	4R	A	Q2	1R	Q1	0 / 10	5–10	33%
Wimbledon	A	A	A	3R	2R	1R	2R	1R	1R	1R	2R	A	A	1R	A	0 / 9	5–9	36%
US Open	A	A	A	1R	1R	1R	2R	3R	2R	1R	1R	A	A	1R	A	0 / 9	4–9	31%
Win–loss	0–0	0–1	0–1	2–4	1–4	2–4	5–4	4–4	2–4	0–4	4–3	0–1	0–0	0–4	0–0	0 / 38	20–38	34%
ATP Tour Masters 1000
Indian Wells Masters	A	A	A	A	1R	A	1R	A	2R	1R	1R	1R	A	A	A	0 / 6	1–6	14%
Miami Open	A	A	A	A	1R	2R	1R	1R	1R	2R	2R	1R	A	A	A	0 / 8	3–8	27%
Monte-Carlo Masters	A	A	A	A	Q2	QF	3R	QF	QF	3R	2R	A	A	1R	Q1	0 / 7	14–7	67%
Madrid Open	Not Held						Q1	1R	Q2	2R	A	A	A	Q2	A	0 / 2	1–2	33%
Italian Open	A	A	A	A	A	A	1R	2R	1R	QF	3R	Q1	A	Q1	Q1	0 / 5	6–5	55%
Hamburg	A	A	A	A	2R	QF	2R	1R	2R	1R	1R	A	1R	NMS		0 / 8	6–8	0%
Canada Masters	A	A	A	1R	A	3R	A	1R	A	1R	1R	A	A	A	A	0 / 5	2–5	29%
Cincinnati Masters	A	A	A	2R	A	3R	Q2	Q1	A	1R	1R	A	A	A	A	0 / 4	3–4	43%
Paris Masters	A	A	A	A	A	1R	A	A	A	A	A	A	A	Q1	A	0 / 1	0–1	0%
Win–loss	0–0	0–0	0–0	0–0	1–3	11–6	3–5	4–6	5–5	7–8	4–7	0–2	0–1	0–1	0–0	0 / 44	35–44	44%

=== Doubles ===
Tournament	1998	1999	2000	2001	2002	2003	2004	2005	2006	2007	SR	W–L	Win %
Australian Open	1R	1R	1R	2R	2R	1R	2R	1R	A	2R	0 / 9	4–9	31%
French Open	2R	1R	1R	2R	A	1R	1R	2R	QF	A	0 / 8	6–8	43%
Wimbledon	A	1R	2R	1R	A	1R	1R	1R	1R	A	0 / 7	1–7	13%
US Open	A	1R	1R	A	A	1R	2R	1R	1R	A	0 / 6	1–6	14%
Win–loss	1–2	0–4	1–4	2–3	1–1	0–4	2–4	1–4	4–3	0–1	0 / 30	12–30	29%
ATP Tour Masters 1000
Indian Wells Masters	A	A	Q2	A	A	A	A	A	A	A	0 / 0	0–0	–
Miami Open	A	A	A	1R	SF	A	A	A	A	A	0 / 2	4–2	67%
Monte-Carlo Masters	A	A	A	1R	A	A	A	A	A	A	0 / 1	0–1	0%
Hamburg	A	A	1R	Q2	A	A	A	A	A	A	0 / 1	0–1	0%
Win–loss	0–0	0–0	0–1	0–2	4–1	0–0	0–0	0–0	0–0	0–0\	0 / 4	4–4	50%

== Junior Grand Slam finals ==
=== Singles: 1 (1 title) ===
Result	Year	Tournament	Surface	Opponent	Score
Win	1996	French Open	Clay	(Sweden) Björn Rehnquist	6–3, 7–6

== Top 10 wins per season ==
Season	1995	1996	1997	1998	1999	2000	2001	2002	2003	2004	2005	2006	2007	2008	2009	2010	Total
Wins	0	0	1	0	0	0	0	2	0	1	0	1	0	0	0	0	5

=== Wins over top-ten players per season ===
#	Player	Rank	Tournament	Surface	Rd	Score
1997
1.	(South Africa) Wayne Ferreira	10	Barcelona, Spain	Clay	2R	4–6, 6–2, 7–5
2002
2.	(Australia) Lleyton Hewitt	1	Australian Open, Melbourne	Hard	1R	1–6, 6–1, 6–4, 7–6^{(7–4)}
2004
3.	(Spain) Juan Carlos Ferrero	2	Barcelona, Spain	Clay	3R	6–2, 6–3
4.	(France) Sébastien Grosjean	10	Monte Carlo, Monaco	Clay	2R	6–4, 6–2
2006
5.	(United States) Andy Roddick	5	French Open, Paris	Clay	1R	6–4, 7–5, 1–0 ret.
