= 2007 in tennis =

This page covers all the important events in the sport of tennis in 2007. Primarily, it provides the results of notable tournaments throughout the year on both the ATP and WTA Tours, the Davis Cup, and the Fed Cup.

== News ==
=== January ===
See: 2007 ATP Tour, 2007 WTA Tour

- 1 – In the Next Generation Adelaide International for the first time in history besides the Tennis Masters Cup a round-robin competition is in use to replace the normally used 32 player brackets. The new system will be used in several other tournaments throughout the season.
- 2 – Lleyton Hewitt wins his first match in three months. Hewitt did not play any competitive matches after the 2006 Davis Cup loss versus Argentina. He was leading 6–1, 4–2 when his opponent Janko Tipsarević retired with a leg injury. Kristian Pless defeats David Nalbandian in a first round surprise in Chennai.
- 3 – Mark Philippoussis is forced to retire after hyperextending his knee during his second match at the 2007 Hopman Cup versus Jérôme Haehnel. An MRI showed that he had torn cartilage in his knee, forcing him to miss the 2007 Australian Open. yahoo.com
- 4 – Women world #1 Justine Henin announces her withdrawal from 2007 Australian Open for personal reasons, which appear to be the breakup of her marriage. espn.com
- 5 – Nadia Petrova and Dmitry Tursunov capture the 2007 Hopman Cup for Russia by beating Spain's Anabel Medina Garrigues and Tommy Robredo in the final. yahoo.com
- 6 – In the 2007 ATP Tour, Ivan Ljubičić beat Andy Murray in the final of Qatar ExxonMobil Open. In the 2007 WTA Tour the first wins go to Dinara Safina (Mondial Australian Women's Hardcourts) and Jelena Janković (ASB Classic) who beat Martina Hingis and Vera Zvonareva in the finals, respectively. bbc.co.uk, abc.net, nbc10.com
- 7 – In 2007 ATP Tour finals, Xavier Malisse (Chennai Open) and Novak Djokovic (Next Generation Adelaide International) were too strong for Stefan Koubek and Chris Guccione respectively. tennis-x.com, yahoo.com
- 9 – Rafael Nadal withdraws in his first round match in Sydney which he played against Chris Guccione. Nadal did not take any risk for the upcoming Australian Open. smh.com.au
- 10 – Also Nikolay Davydenko withdraws in Sydney to increase his chances of participation in Melbourne at the Australian Open. Davydenko withdrew after Paul-Henri Mathieu won the first set 6–4. Venus Williams announces her withdrawal for the Australian Open due to a wrist injury. mosnews.com, usatoday.com
- 12 – Kim Clijsters wins the Medibank International being the first to beat Jelena Janković in 2007, 4–6, 7–6, 6–4 in the final. Anna Chakvetadze defeats fellow Russian Vasilisa Bardina in the Moorilla Hobart International final. abc.net.au, msn.com
- 13 – Andy Roddick is the first to beat world number one Roger Federer in 2007 as he wins the AAMI Kooyong Classic 6–2, 3–6, 6–3. It was Roddick's second win over Federer in his career, the last one being August 2003; however, it does not rank as an official victory. In the men's competition James Blake successfully defends his Medibank International title, beating Carlos Moyà in the final. David Ferrer beat Tommy Robredo in an all Spanish final in the Heineken Open in New Zealand. bbc.co.uk, yahoo.com, abc.net.au
- 15 – Mardy Fish upsets Ivan Ljubičić in the first round of the 2007 Australian Open. The American beats the fourth seeded Croat 4–6, 7–6, 6–4, 6–4. Andy Roddick and Jo-Wilfried Tsonga equaled the tournament record of the longest tie-break with 38 points. Tsonga won the tie-break 20–18, but Roddick recovered to go through in four sets. For the first time in the history of the tournaments fans riot near the courts. The rioting fans were of Serbian and Croatian origin. australianopen.com
- 16 – The heat is the biggest opponent during the second day of the Australian Open. Maria Sharapova escapes versus Camille Pin as she squanders a 5–0 lead in the final set, but still wins the set 9–7, with Pin being two points away from victory serving for the match at 7–6. Andy Murray defeats Alberto Martín 6–0, 6–0, 6–1, winning sixteen games in a row. australianopen.com
- 17 – Many matches are affected by rain, also the match between Russian Marat Safin, seeded 26, and Israeli qualifier Dudi Sela. Marat Safin wisely requests that play be suspended while noticeably out of the match with Sela up two sets to one, six games to five, and 30–30. After the delay, Safin returned to win the fourth set and then the final set 6–0 to advance. 2006 finalist Marcos Baghdatis loses to Gaël Monfils 7–6, 6–2, 2–6, 6–0, while 24th seed Juan Carlos Ferrero loses against Danai Udomchoke. australianopen.com
- 18 – Unseeded Juan Ignacio Chela defeats 17th seeded Jarkko Nieminen 6–3, 2–6, 6–4, 6–4. Australian Alicia Molik, clawed her way into the third round against Kaia Kanepi after being down one set, 1–6, 6–3, 6–2. The only seeded Australian woman in the draw, Samantha Stosur, fell to Croat Jelena Kostanić Tošić, 6–4, 2–6, 6–2. Young American Ashley Harkleroad upset number 17 Anna-Lena Grönefeld, 6–2, 6–2. australianopen.com
- 19 – David Ferrer overcome being two sets to love down against Radek Štěpánek to beat the Czech 6–3 in the fifth and final set. The matchup of the day was two former world number ones in Russian Marat Safin and American Andy Roddick, Roddick advanced in a hard-fought four-set match 7–6. Former world number one Serena Williams survived a miserable first set to defeat number 5 fiery Russian Nadia Petrova 1–6, 7–5, 6–3. australianopen.com
- 20 – The last Australian man in competition, Lleyton Hewitt can not counter the speedy and crafty game shown by Chilean Fernando González, as González wins 6–2, 6–2, 5–7, 6–4. Vera Zvonareva, surprisingly defeated number 13 seed Ana Ivanovic soundly 6–1, 6–2. australianopen.com
- 21 – Unseeded Lucie Šafářová advanced to the quarterfinals courtesy of a 6–4, 6–3 surprising upset of defending champion and number two seed Amélie Mauresmo. Tenth seed Nicole Vaidišová posted a 6–3, 6–3 upset of seventh seed Elena Dementieva. Rising star Israeli Shahar Pe'er caused another upset by winning a 6–4, 6–2 over third seeded Russian Svetlana Kuznetsova. Serena Williams, defeats eleventh-seed Jelena Janković in a 6–3, 6–2 win. australianopen.com
- 22 – Rafael Nadal recovers from being behind twice during his match against Andy Murray before winning 6–1 in the final set. Fernando González upsets fifth seed James Blake in straight sets, 7–5, 6–4, 7–6 to face Nadal in the quarter-final. Tommy Haas defeats eighth seeded David Nalbandian in four sets, while Anna Chakvetadze demolishes the eighth seed woman Patty Schnyder 6–4, 6–1. australianopen.com
- 23 – Justine Henin-Hardenne announces the reason for her Australian Open withdrawal. She and her husband Pierre-Yves Hardenne are planning their divorce. In the first quarter finals played Tommy Robredo fights hard but is unable to win a set against Roger Federer. Andy Roddick has no problems with fellow American Mardy Fish in a 6–2, 6–2, 6–2 meeting. Nicole Vaidišová advances to the semi-finals after beating Lucie Šafářová 6–1, 6–4. Serena Williams does the same as she beat Shahar Pe'er 8–6 in the third set. australianopen.com
- 24 – Second seed Rafael Nadal and third seed Nikolay Davydenko both lose in the quarter-finals against Fernando González and Tommy Haas respectively. González impressed to beat Nadal in straight sets 6–2, 6–4, 6–3, while Haas needed all five sets to beat the Russian. No surprises in the women's competition as first seed Maria Sharapova beats a hard fighting Anna Chakvetadze 7–6, 7–5 and Kim Clijsters overcome losing the first set against Martina Hingis, winning 3–6, 6–4, 6–3. australianopen.com
- 25 – Andy Roddick is having an off day as Roger Federer shows a good form and demolishes the American 6–4, 6–0, 6–2 to become the first man to reach the final. Maria Sharapova has no problems beating Kim Clijsters in her semi final tie and eases to the final 6–4, 6–2. Serena Williams wins a tough first set against Nicole Vaidišová and plays herself to victory in the second, winning 7–6, 6–4. australianopen.com
- 26 – Fernando González eases into the final to face Roger Federer, beating Tommy Haas 6–1, 6–3, 6–1 in the semi-final. Cara Black and Liezel Huber claim the Australian Open women's doubles title with a 6–4 6–7 6–1 victory over Chinese Taipei representatives Chan Yung-jan and Chuang Chia-jung. australianopen.com
- 27 – Serena Williams claims the Australian Open women's singles title defeating Maria Sharapova 6–1, 6–2 in the final. She became the first unseeded winner since Chris O'Neill in 1978. Despite her lost final Sharapova becomes the world's new number one female player. Bob and Mike Bryan successfully defend their Australian Open title in the men's doubles as they are too strong for the Swedish-Belarusian combination Jonas Björkman and Max Mirnyi 7–5, 7–5.australianopen.com
- 28 – Roger Federer becomes the first player to win three consecutive Grand Slam titles twice in his career as he beats Fernando González 7–6, 6–4, 6–4 to win the Australian Open without losing a single set. He became the first player to accomplish this in a Grand Slam Tournament since Björn Borg at Roland Garros in 1980. In their third Grand Slam mixed doubles final Elena Likhovtseva and Daniel Nestor win their first trophy together by beating Victoria Azarenka and Max Mirnyi 6–4 6–4 in the final. australianopen.com

=== February ===
- 4 – Marcos Baghdatis defeats Ivan Ljubičić in the final of the Zagreb Indoor Open, 76(4) 46 64, to claim his 2nd career title.
- 4 – Xavier Malisse claimed his 200th career match win and 2nd Delray Beach title in three years by defeating American James Blake 5–7, 6–4, 6–4.
- 4 – Peruvian Luis Horna captured his second career ATP crown with a 7–5, 6–3 win in the Movistar Open final, causing Chilean Nicolás Massú to finish as the runner-up at his hometown tournament for the second straight year.

=== May ===
- 20 – Roger Federer won the AMS Hamburg final against Spaniard Rafael Nadal. It marked the first time that Federer could beat Nadal on clay and ended the Spaniard's 81-match winning streak (Open Era record) on clay.

=== July ===
- 8 – Roger Federer won his 5th straight Wimbledon Gentlemen's Singles title, an Open Era record he now shares with Swede Björn Borg. In the final he beat Nadal in five sets: 7–6, 4–6, 7–6, 2–6, 6–2.

=== August ===
- 8 – Novak Djokovic won the Canada Masters in Montréal beating Roger Federer in three sets.

=== September ===
- 8 – Justine Henin of Belgium won her second U.S. Open Women's Singles title, beating Russian Svetlana Kuznetsova in two sets.
- 9 – Roger Federer won his 4th straight U.S. Open Men's Singles title, an Open Era record. In the final he beat Serb Novak Djokovic in three sets: 7–6, 7–6, 6–4.

== ITF ==
=== Grand Slam events ===
==== Australian Open (15 – 28 January) ====
- Men's Singles: (Switzerland) Roger Federer d. (Chile) Fernando González, 7–6(7–2), 6–4, 6–4.
- Women's Singles: (United States) Serena Williams d. (Russia) Maria Sharapova, 6–1, 6–2.
- Men's Doubles: (United States) Bob Bryan & (United States) Mike Bryan d. (Sweden) Jonas Björkman & (Belarus) Max Mirnyi, 7–5, 7–5.
- Women's Doubles: (Zimbabwe) Cara Black & (South Africa) Liezel Huber d. (Chinese Taipei) Chan Yung-jan & (Chinese Taipei) Chuang Chia-jung, 6–4, 6–7(4–7), 6–1.
- Mixed Doubles: (Canada) Daniel Nestor & (Russia) Elena Likhovtseva d. (Belarus) Max Mirnyi & (Belarus) Victoria Azarenka, 6–4, 6–4.

==== French Open (27 May – 10 June) ====
- Men's Singles: (Spain) Rafael Nadal d. (Switzerland) Roger Federer, 6–3, 4–6, 6–3, 6–4
- Women's Singles: (Belgium) Justine Henin d. (Serbia) Ana Ivanovic, 6–1, 6–2
- Men's Doubles: (The Bahamas) Mark Knowles & (Canada) Daniel Nestor d. (Czech Republic) Lukáš Dlouhý & (Czech Republic) Pavel Vízner, 2–6, 6–3, 6–4
- Women's Doubles: (Australia) Alicia Molik & (Italy) Mara Santangelo d. (Slovenia) Katarina Srebotnik & (Japan) Ai Sugiyama, 7–6(5), 6–4
- Mixed Doubles: (France) Nathalie Dechy & (Israel) Andy Ram d. (Serbia) Nenad Zimonjić & (Slovenia) Katarina Srebotnik, 7–5, 6–3

==== Wimbledon (25 June – 8 July) ====
- Men's Singles: (Switzerland) Roger Federer d. (Spain) Rafael Nadal, 7–6(9–7), 4–6, 7–6(7–3), 2–6, 6–2
- Women's Singles: (United States) Venus Williams d. (France) Marion Bartoli, 6–4, 6–1
- Men's Doubles: (France) Arnaud Clément & (France) Michaël Llodra d. (United States) Bob Bryan & (United States) Mike Bryan, 6–7(5), 6–3, 6–4, 6–4
- Women's Doubles: (Zimbabwe) Cara Black & (South Africa) Liezel Huber d. (Slovenia) Katarina Srebotnik & (Japan) Ai Sugiyama, 3–6, 6–3, 6–2
- Mixed Doubles: (United Kingdom) Jamie Murray & (Serbia) Jelena Janković d. (Sweden) Jonas Björkman & (Australia) Alicia Molik, 6–4, 3–6, 6–1.

==== U.S. Open (27 August – 9 September) ====
- Men's Singles: (Switzerland) Roger Federer d. (Serbia) Novak Djokovic, 7–6(4) 7–6(2) 6–4
- Women's Singles: (Belgium) Justine Henin d. (Russia) Svetlana Kuznetsova, 6–1, 6–3
- Men's Doubles: (Sweden) Simon Aspelin & (Austria) Julian Knowle d. (Czech Republic) Lukáš Dlouhý & (Czech Republic) Pavel Vízner, 7–5, 6–4
- Women's Doubles: (France) Nathalie Dechy & (Russia) Dinara Safina d. (Chinese Taipei) Chan Yung-jan & (Chinese Taipei) Chuang Chia-jung, 6–4, 6–2
- Mixed Doubles: (Belarus) Victoria Azarenka & (Belarus) Max Mirnyi d. (United States) Meghann Shaughnessy & (India) Leander Paes, 6–4, (8)7–6

=== Davis Cup ===
World Group Draw

- S-Seeded
- U-Unseeded
- *Choice of ground

Round One
S	Russia	3
U	Chile*	2
S	France*	4
U	Romania	1
S	Croatia	2
U	Germany*	3
S	Australia	2
U	Belgium*	3
U	Czech Republic*	1
S	United States	4
U	Switzerland*	2
S	Spain	3
U	Sweden	3
S	Belarus*	2
U	Austria*	1
S	Argentina	4

Quarterfinals
S	Russia*	3
S	France	2
U	Germany	3
U	Belgium*	2
S	United States*	4
S	Spain	1
U	Sweden*	4
S	Argentina	1

Semifinals
S	Russia*	3
U	Germany	2
S	United States	4
U	Sweden*	1

Final
S	Russia	1
S	United States*	4

Final

United States
4
Memorial Coliseum, Portland, Oregon, USA
30 November – 2 December 2007
hard (indoors)

Russia
1

			1	2	3	4	5
1	(United States) (Russia)	Andy Roddick; Dmitry Tursunov	6; 4	6; 4	6; 2
2	(United States) (Russia)	James Blake; Mikhail Youzhny	6; 3	7^{7} 6^{5}	6^{4} 7^{7}	7^{7} 6^{4}
3	(United States) (Russia)	Bob Bryan / Mike Bryan; Igor Andreev / Nikolay Davydenko	7^{7} 6^{5}	6; 4	6; 2
4	(United States) (Russia)	Bob Bryan; Igor Andreev	3; 6	6^{5} 7^{7}
5	(United States) (Russia)	James Blake; Dmitry Tursunov	1; 6	6; 3	7; 5

World Group Playoffs

Date: 21–23 September

Venue	Home team	Score	Visiting team
Belgrade, Serbia	Serbia	4–1	Australia _{(S)}
Innsbruck, Austria	Austria _{(S)}	4–1	Brazil
Lima, Peru	Peru	4–1	Belarus _{(S)}
Ramat HaSharon, Israel	Israel	3–2	Chile _{(S)}
London, Great Britain	Great Britain	4–1	Croatia _{(S)}
Prague, Czech Republic	Czech Republic _{(S)}	3–2	Switzerland
Osaka, Japan	Japan	2–3	Romania _{(S)}
Bratislava, Slovakia	Slovakia _{(S)}	2–3	South Korea

=== Fed Cup ===
World Group Draw

- S-Seeded
- U-Unseeded
- *Choice of ground

Quarterfinals
S	Belgium	0
U	United States*	5
S	Russia*	5
U	Spain	0
U	Japan	0
S	France*	5
U	China	0
S	Italy*	5

Semifinals
U	United States	2
S	Russia	3
S	France	2
S	Italy	3

Final
S	Russia	4
S	Italy	0

Final

Russia
4
Luzhniki Palace of Sports, Moscow, Russia
15–16 September 2007
hard (indoors)

Italy
0

			1	2	3
1	(Russia) (Italy)	Anna Chakvetadze; Francesca Schiavone	6; 4	4; 6	6; 4
2	(Russia) (Italy)	Svetlana Kuznetsova; Mara Santangelo	6; 1	6; 2
3	(Russia) (Italy)	Svetlana Kuznetsova; Francesca Schiavone	4; 6	7^{10} 6^{8}	7; 5
4	(Russia) (Italy)	Elena Vesnina; Mara Santangelo	6; 2	6; 4
5	(Russia) (Italy)	Nadia Petrova / Elena Vesnina; Mara Santangelo / Roberta Vinci				not played

=== Hopman Cup ===
The Hopman Cup is the Official Mixed Team Competition of the ITF, played at the Burswood Entertainment Complex, in Perth, Western Australia. 2007's was the 19th edition of the competition. This year Russia's pairing of Dmitry Tursunov and Nadia Petrova defeated Tommy Robredo and Anabel Medina Garrigues of Spain in the Final.

Group A

Seed	Team	Pld	W	L	MW	ML	Pts
1	Russia	3	2	1	6	3	4
-	France	3	2	1	5	4	4
-	Australia	3	2	1	4	5	4
4	USA	3	0	3	3	6	0

Group B

Seed	Team	Pld	W	L	MW	ML	Pts
2	Spain	3	2	1	6	3	4
-	India	3	2	1	5	4	4
3	Czech Republic	3	1	2	4	5	2
-	Croatia	3	1	2	3	6	2

The Final

(Russia)
Russia
2
1
Spain
(Spain)
Burswood Entertainment Complex, Perth
5 January 2007, 17:00 AWST UTC+8

1	(Russia)	Nadia Petrova	6	6
1	(Spain)	Anabel Medina Garrigues	0	4
2	(Russia)	Dmitry Tursunov	6	7
2	(Spain)	Tommy Robredo	4	5
3	(Russia)	Nadia Petrova/Dmitry Tursunov	6
3	(Spain)	Anabel Medina Garrigues/Tommy Robredo	8

== ATP Tour ==
=== Tennis Masters Cup ===
Men's singles

Championship	Champions	Finalists	Score in the final
Shanghai	(Switzerland) Roger Federer	(Spain) David Ferrer	6–2, 6–3, 6–2

Men's doubles

Championship	Champions	Finalists	Score in the final
Shanghai	(The Bahamas) Mark Knowles (Canada) Daniel Nestor	(Sweden) Simon Aspelin (Austria) Julian Knowle	6–2, 6–3

=== ATP Masters Series ===
Championship	Champions	Finalists	Score in the final
Indian Wells	(Spain) Rafael Nadal	(Serbia) Novak Djokovic	6–2, 7–5
Miami	(Serbia) Novak Djokovic	(Argentina) Guillermo Cañas	6–3, 6–2, 6–4
Monte Carlo	(Spain) Rafael Nadal	(Switzerland) Roger Federer	6–4, 6–4
Rome	(Spain) Rafael Nadal	(Chile) Fernando González	6–2, 6–2
Hamburg	(Switzerland) Roger Federer	(Spain) Rafael Nadal	2–6, 6–2, 6–0
Montréal	(Serbia) Novak Djokovic	(Switzerland) Roger Federer	7–6^{(7–2)}, 2–6, 7–6^{(7–2)}
Cincinnati	(Switzerland) Roger Federer	(United States) James Blake	6–1, 6–4
Madrid	(Argentina) David Nalbandian	(Switzerland) Roger Federer	1–6, 6–3, 6–3
Paris	(Argentina) David Nalbandian	(Spain) Rafael Nadal	6–4, 6–0

  - Doubles: (Czech Republic) Martin Damm & (India) Leander Paes d. (Israel) Jonathan Erlich & (Israel) Andy Ram 6–4, 6–4
- Miami, Florida, USA, outdoor hardcourt
  - Doubles: (United States) Bob Bryan & (United States) Mike Bryan d. (Czech Republic) Martin Damm & (India) Leander Paes 6–7(7), 6–3, 10–7
- Monte Carlo, Monaco, outdoor clay
  - Doubles: (United States) Bob Bryan & (United States) Mike Bryan d. (France) Julien Benneteau & (France) Richard Gasquet 6–2, 6–1
- Rome, Italy, outdoor clay
  - Doubles: (France) Fabrice Santoro & (Serbia) Nenad Zimonjić d. (United States) Bob Bryan & (United States) Mike Bryan 6–4, 6–7(4), 10–7
- Hamburg, Germany, outdoor clay
  - Doubles: (United States) Bob Bryan & (United States) Mike Bryan d. (Australia) Paul Hanley & (Zimbabwe) Kevin Ullyett 6–3, 6–4
- Montréal, Canada, outdoor hardcourt
  - Doubles: (India) Mahesh Bhupathi & (Czech Republic) Pavel Vízner d. (Australia) Paul Hanley & (Zimbabwe) Kevin Ullyett 6–4, 6–4
- Cincinnati, Ohio, USA, outdoor hardcourt
  - Doubles: (Israel) Jonathan Erlich & (Israel) Andy Ram d. (United States) Bob Bryan & (United States) Mike Bryan 4–6, 6–3, 13–11
- Madrid, Spain, indoor hardcourt
  - Doubles: (United States) Bob Bryan & (United States) Mike Bryan d. (Poland) Mariusz Fyrstenberg & (Poland) Marcin Matkowski 6–3, 7–6(4)
- Paris, France, indoor carpet
  - Doubles: (United States) Bob Bryan & (United States) Mike Bryan d. (Canada) Daniel Nestor & (Serbia) Nenad Zimonjić 6–3, 7–6(4)

=== ARAG ATP World Team Cup ===
- TP: Ties Played
- TW: Ties Won
- MW: Matches Won
- SW: Sets Won

Red Group	TP	TW	MW	SW
Argentina	3	2	6	13
Chile	3	2	4	9
Sweden	3	1	4	12
United States	3	1	4	9

Blue Group	TP	TW	MW	SW
Czech Republic	3	3	7	15
Spain	3	2	6	13
Germany	3	1	4	8
Belgium	3	0	1	4

Final

==== Argentina vs. Czech Republic ====
Argentina
2
Düsseldorf, Germany
26 May 2007
clay

Czech Republic
1

			1	2	3
1	(Argentina) (Czech Republic)	Juan Ignacio Chela; Tomáš Berdych	6; 3	3; 6	6^{5} 7^{7}
2	(Argentina) (Czech Republic)	Agustín Calleri; Jan Hájek	6; 3	6; 1
3	(Argentina) (Czech Republic)	José Acasuso / Agustín Calleri; Tomáš Berdych / Martin Damm	2; 6	6; 4	10; 4

== Sony Ericsson WTA Tour ==
=== WTA Tour Championships ===
Women's singles

Championship	Champions	Finalists	Score in the final
Madrid	(Belgium) Justine Henin	(Russia) Maria Sharapova	5–7, 7–5, 6–3

Women's doubles

Championship	Champions	Finalists	Score in the final
Madrid	(Zimbabwe) Cara Black (United States) Liezel Huber	(Slovenia) Katarina Srebotnik (Japan) Ai Sugiyama	5–7, 6–3, [10–8]

=== WTA Tier I ===
- Tokyo, Japan: Toray Pan Pacific Open, indoor carpet
  - Singles: (Switzerland) Martina Hingis d. (Serbia) Ana Ivanovic 6–4, 6–2
  - Doubles: (United States) Lisa Raymond & (Australia) Samantha Stosur d. (United States) Vania King & (Australia) Rennae Stubbs 7–6(6), 3–6, 7–5
- Indian Wells, California, USA: Pacific Life Open, outdoor hardcourt
  - Singles: (Slovakia) Daniela Hantuchová d. (Russia) Svetlana Kuznetsova 6–3, 6–4
  - Doubles: (United States) Lisa Raymond & (Australia) Samantha Stosur d. (Chinese Taipei) Chan Yung-jan & (Chinese Taipei) Chuang Chia-jung 6–3, 7–5
- Miami, Florida, USA: Sony Ericsson Open, outdoor hardcourt
  - Singles: (United States) Serena Williams d. (Belgium) Justine Henin 0–6, 7–5, 6–3
  - Doubles: (United States) Lisa Raymond & (Australia) Samantha Stosur d. (Zimbabwe) Cara Black & (South Africa) Liezel Huber 6–4 3–6 7–5
- Charleston, South Carolina, USA: Family Circle Cup, outdoor clay
  - Singles: (Serbia) Jelena Janković d. (Russia) Dinara Safina 6–2, 6–2
  - Doubles: (China) Zi Yan & (China) Jie Zheng d. (China) Shuai Peng & (China) Tiantian Sun 7–5, 6–0
- Berlin, Germany: Qatar Total German Open, outdoor clay
  - Singles: (Serbia) Ana Ivanovic d. (Russia) Svetlana Kuznetsova 3–6, 6–4, 7–6(4)
  - Doubles: (United States) Lisa Raymond & (Australia) Samantha Stosur d. (Italy) Tathiana Garbin & (Italy) Roberta Vinci
- Rome, Italy: Internazionali d'Italia, outdoor clay
  - Singles: (Serbia) Jelena Janković d. (Russia) Svetlana Kuznetsova 7–5, 6–1
  - Doubles: (France) Nathalie Dechy & (Italy) Mara Santangelo d. (Italy) Tathiana Garbin & (Italy) Roberta Vinci 6–4, 6–1
- San Diego, California, USA: Acura Classic, outdoor hardcourt
  - Singles: (Russia) Maria Sharapova d. (Switzerland) Patty Schnyder 6–2, 6–3, 6–0
  - Doubles: (Zimbabwe) Cara Black & (United States) Liezel Huber d. (Belarus) Victoria Azarenka & (Russia) Anna Chakvetadze 7–5, 6–4
- Toronto, Canada: Rogers Cup presented by National Bank, outdoor hardcourt
  - Singles: (Belgium) Justine Henin d. (Serbia) Jelena Janković 7–6(3), 7–5
  - Doubles: (Slovenia) Katarina Srebotnik & (Japan) Ai Sugiyama d. (Zimbabwe) Cara Black & (United States) Liezel Huber 6–4, 2–6, 10–5
- Moscow, Russia: Kremlin Cup, indoor carpet
  - Singles: (Russia) Elena Dementieva d. (United States) Serena Williams 5–7, 6–1, 6–1
  - Doubles: (Zimbabwe) Cara Black & (United States) Liezel Huber d. (Belarus) Victoria Azarenka & (Belarus) Tatiana Poutchek 4–6, 6–1, 10–7
- Zürich, Switzerland: Zürich Open, indoor hardcourt
  - Singles: (Belgium) Justine Henin d. (France) Tatiana Golovin 6–4, 6–4
  - Doubles: (Czech Republic) Květa Peschke & (Australia) Rennae Stubbs d. (United States) Lisa Raymond & (Italy) Francesca Schiavone 7–5, 7–6(1)

== Exhibition tournaments ==
=== AAMI Kooyong Classic ===
(United States) Andy Roddick d. (Switzerland) Roger Federer 6–2, 3–6, 6–3

=== Watsons Water Champions Challenge ===
(Belgium) Kim Clijsters d. (Russia) Maria Sharapova 6–3, 7–6(8)

=== River Oaks International Tennis Tournament ===
- Singles: (Russia) Dmitry Tursunov d. (Chile) Nicolás Massú 2–6, 1–0 (ret)
- Doubles: (Argentina) Diego Hartfield & (Argentina) Juan Mónaco d. (United States) Paul Goldstein & (United States) Jim Thomas 7–6(5), 2–6, 7–6(8)

=== Battle of Surfaces ===
(Spain) Rafael Nadal d. (Switzerland) Roger Federer 7–5, 4–6, 7–6(10)

=== Liverpool International Tennis Tournament ===
- Men's Singles: (Spain) David Ferrer d. (United States) Vince Spadea 6–4, 6–4
- Women's Singles: (United States) Ashley Harkleroad d. (Denmark) Caroline Wozniacki 7–6(1), 3–6, [10–8]

=== Boodles Challenge ===
(Spain) Fernando Verdasco d. (Argentina) David Nalbandián 6–3, 6–3

=== Turbo Tennis ===
- London: (United Kingdom) Andy Murray d. (Croatia) Goran Ivanišević 7–4
- Zaragoza: (Spain) David Ferrer d. (Spain) Rafael Nadal 7–5

=== Cachantún Beauty Challenge ===
(Argentina) Gisela Dulko d. (Slovakia) Dominika Cibulková 6–2, 6–7(4), [10–8]

== International Tennis Hall of Fame ==
- Class of 2007:
  - Sven Davidson, player
  - Pete Sampras, player
  - Arantxa Sánchez Vicario, player
  - Russ Adams, contributor
