= 2007 Wimbledon Championships =

- Date: 25 June – 8 July
- Edition: 121st
- Category: Grand Slam (ITF)
- Draw: 128S / 64D / 48XD
- Prize money: £11,282,710
- Surface: Grass
- Location: Church Road; SW19, Wimbledon, London, United Kingdom
- Venue: All England Lawn Tennis and Croquet Club
- Attendance: 444,810

Champions

Men's singles
- (Switzerland) Roger Federer

Women's singles
- (United States) Venus Williams

Men's doubles
- (France) Arnaud Clément / (France) Michaël Llodra

Women's doubles
- (Zimbabwe) Cara Black / (South Africa) Liezel Huber

Mixed doubles
- (United Kingdom) Jamie Murray / (Serbia) Jelena Janković

Wheelchair men's doubles
- (Netherlands) Robin Ammerlaan / (Netherlands) Ronald Vink

Boys' singles
- (United States) Donald Young

Girls' singles
- (Poland) Urszula Radwańska

Boys' doubles
- (Paraguay) Daniel Lopez / (Italy) Matteo Trevisan

Girls' doubles
- (Russia) Anastasia Pavlyuchenkova / (Poland) Urszula Radwańska

Gentlemen's invitation doubles
- (Netherlands) Jacco Eltingh / (Netherlands) Paul Haarhuis

Ladies' invitation doubles
- (Czech Republic) Jana Novotná / (Czech Republic) Helena Suková

Senior gentlemen's invitation doubles
- (United Kingdom) Jeremy Bates / (Sweden) Anders Järryd
← 2006 ·	Wimbledon Championships	· 2008 →

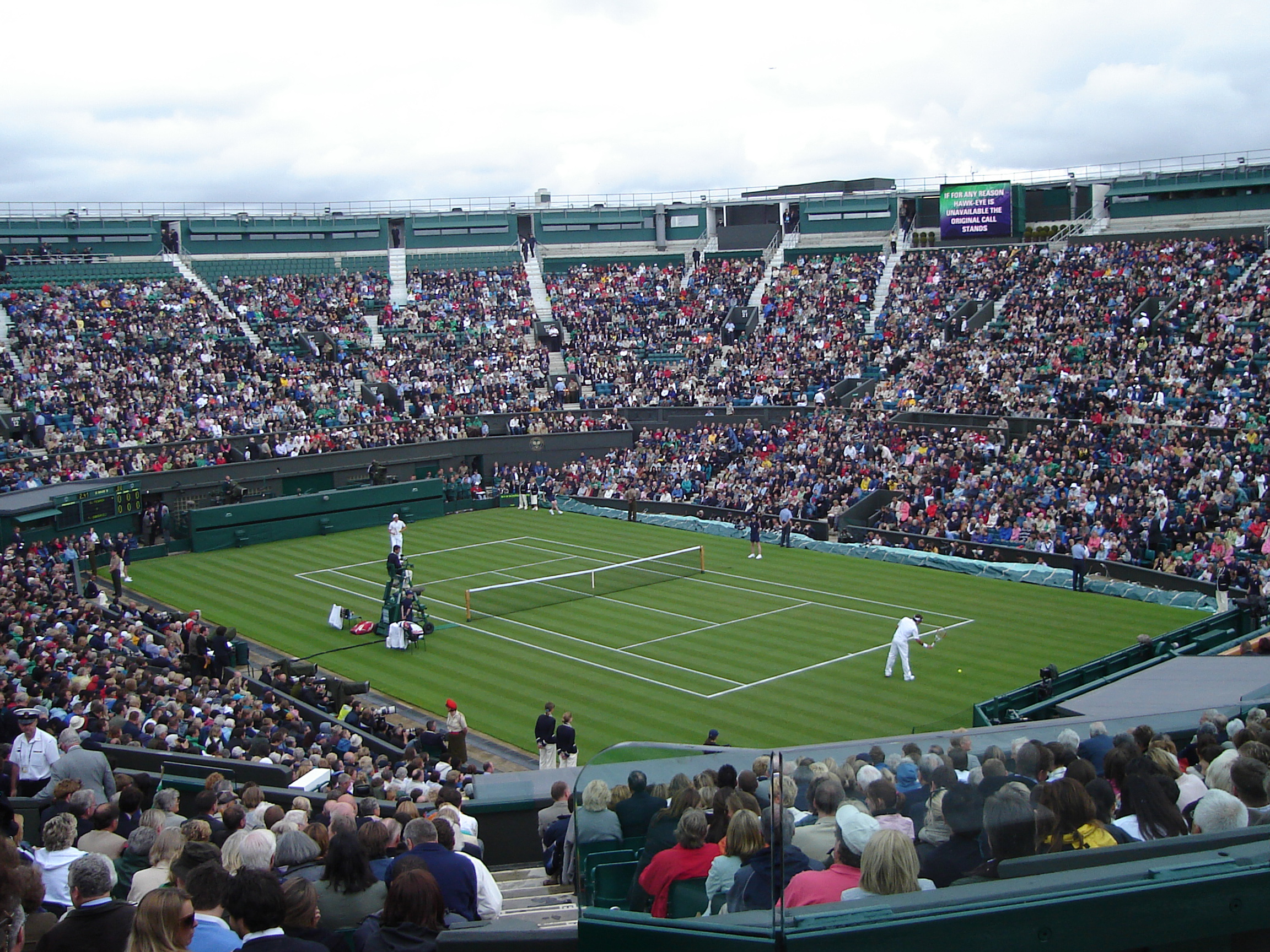
A roofless Centre Court in the early stages of redevelopment.

The 2007 Wimbledon Championships was a tennis tournament played on grass courts at the All England Lawn Tennis and Croquet Club in Wimbledon, London in the United Kingdom. It was the 121st edition of the Wimbledon Championships and were held from 25 June to 8 July 2007. It was the third Grand Slam tennis event of the year.

Reconstruction work on Centre Court was in progress and thus it had no roof. The Wimbledon Championships adopted Hawk-Eye technology for the first time on Centre Court and Court 1. The Cyclops system was still used on other courts.

The Gentlemen's final was won by Roger Federer for the fifth consecutive time, a feat only before achieved in the Open Era by Björn Borg. It was the third longest men's singles final of all time at 3 hours and 45 minutes. Venus Williams claimed the Ladies' title by defeating Frenchwoman Marion Bartoli, a surprise finalist who had defeated world number one at the time Justine Henin. For the first time in twenty years, the Championships saw a home player win a senior title as Jamie Murray won the mixed doubles with Serbian partner Jelena Janković.

== Point and prize money distribution ==
=== Point distribution ===
Below are the tables with the point distribution for each discipline of the tournament.

==== Senior points ====
Event	W	F	SF	QF	Round of 16	Round of 32	Round of 64	Round of 128	Q	Q3	Q2	Q1
Men's singles	1000	700	450	250	150	75	35	5	12	8	4	0
Men's doubles	1000	700	450	250	150	75	0	—	12	—	0	0
Women's singles	1000	700	450	250	140	90	60	2				
Women's doubles	1000	700	450	250	140	90	0	—		—	0	0

=== Prize distribution ===
On 24 April 2007, Wimbledon announced that the prize money would increase to £700,000 (US$1.4 million) for men and women singles champions. The total prize fund would be £11,282,710 (US$22,565,420), the highest any tennis tournament has ever offered.

Event	W	F	SF	QF	Round of 16	Round of 32	Round of 64	Round of 128
Singles	£700,000	£350,000						
Doubles*	£222,900	£111,440						—
Mixed doubles*	£90,000	£45,000						—

_{* per team}

== Champions ==
=== Seniors ===
==== Men's singles ====
(Switzerland) Roger Federer defeated (Spain) Rafael Nadal, 7–6^{(9–7)}, 4–6, 7–6^{(7–3)}, 2–6, 6–2

- Federer won his fifth consecutive title, equalling the modern-era record set by Björn Borg. It was also the first time that Federer had played five sets in the final of a Grand Slam.

==== Women's singles ====
(United States) Venus Williams defeated (France) Marion Bartoli, 6–4, 6–1

- The final was fought between the two lowest seeds ever to appear in a Wimbledon final, with Williams starting the tournament as the no. 23 seed and Bartoli as the no. 18 seed.

==== Men's doubles ====
(France) Arnaud Clément / (France) Michaël Llodra defeated (United States) Bob Bryan / (United States) Mike Bryan, 6–7^{(5–7)}, 6–3, 6–4, 6–4

- It was Clément's 1st and only career Grand Slam doubles title. It was Llodra's 3rd career Grand Slam doubles title and his 1st at Wimbledon.

==== Women's doubles ====
(Zimbabwe) Cara Black / (South Africa) Liezel Huber defeated (Slovenia) Katarina Srebotnik / (Japan) Ai Sugiyama, 3–6, 6–3, 6–2

- It was Black's 4th career Grand Slam doubles title and her 3rd at Wimbledon. It was Huber's 3rd career Grand Slam doubles title and her 2nd at Wimbledon.

=== Mixed doubles ===
(United Kingdom) Jamie Murray / (Serbia) Jelena Janković defeated (Sweden) Jonas Björkman / (Australia) Alicia Molik, 6–4, 3–6, 6–1

- This marked the first grand slam win of both Jamie Murray and Jelena Janković.

=== Juniors ===
==== Boys' singles ====
(United States) Donald Young defeated (Belarus) Vladimir Ignatic, 7–5, 6–1

==== Girls' singles ====
(Poland) Urszula Radwańska defeated (United States) Madison Brengle, 2–6, 6–3, 6–0

==== Boys' doubles ====
(Paraguay) Daniel Alejandro López / (Italy) Matteo Trevisan defeated (Czech Republic) Roman Jebavý / (Slovakia) Martin Kližan, 7–6(5), 4–6, [10–8]

==== Girls' doubles ====
(Russia) Anastasia Pavlyuchenkova / (Poland) Urszula Radwańska defeated (Japan) Misaki Doi / (Japan) Kurumi Nara, 6–4, 2–6, [10–7]

=== Other events ===
==== Gentlemen's invitation doubles ====
(Netherlands) Jacco Eltingh / (Netherlands) Paul Haarhuis defeated (United Kingdom) Mark Petchey / (United Kingdom) Chris Wilkinson, 6–2, 6–2

==== Ladies' invitation doubles ====
(Czech Republic) Jana Novotná / (Czech Republic) Helena Suková defeated (South Africa) Ilana Kloss / (United States) Rosalyn Nideffer, 6–3, 6–3

==== Senior gentlemen's invitation doubles ====
(United Kingdom) Jeremy Bates / (Sweden) Anders Järryd defeated (United States) Kevin Curren / (United States) Johan Kriek, 6–3, 6–3

==== Wheelchair men's doubles ====
(Netherlands) Robin Ammerlaan / (Netherlands) Ronald Vink defeated (Japan) Shingo Kunieda / (Japan) Satoshi Saida, 4–6, 7–5, 6–2

== Tournament timeline ==
Day	Comments
1	Roger Federer and Justine Henin were some of the victors on Day 1. Rain however prevented most play.
2	Amélie Mauresmo and Maria Sharapova won their matches, as well as Rafael Nadal, and Tim Henman, who fought very hard and won.
3	Not many matches were completed but among the winners on Day 3 were Andy Roddick, Justine Henin, Fernando González, Jelena Janković, Ana Ivanovic, Richard Gasquet and Martina Hingis. Doubles were scheduled to start on Day 3 but rain stopped most play. This also postponed Tim Henman's match versus Feliciano López. The only doubles match completed was the match in the gentlemen's doubles tournament when the 13 seeds Jaroslav Levinský and David Škoch from the Czech Republic won out on Court 15.
4	Katie O'Brien and Tim Henman were knocked out by Michaëlla Krajicek and Feliciano López respectively. All the high seeds won today, winners include Maria Sharapova, Rafael Nadal, Roger Federer, Venus Williams, Lleyton Hewitt, Nikolay Davydenko, Daniela Hantuchová, James Blake, Novak Djokovic, Amélie Mauresmo and Marcos Baghdatis. For Britain, Jamie Murray and his American partner Eric Butorac won through their first round match of gentlemen's doubles. One surprise on Day 4 was that Juan Ignacio Chela was knocked out by Frenchman Édouard Roger-Vasselin.
5	Juan Carlos Ferrero beat James Blake. A shock upset by Janko Tipsarević sent seeded Fernando González out of the tournament in five sets. Andy Roddick, Serena Williams and Roger Federer easily won their matches as well. There was also doubles play.
6	Only three matches were completed. Amélie Mauresmo and Maria Sharapova advanced to fourth round, James Auckland with Claire Curran won their match in first round of mixed doubles.
MS	Middle Sunday
7	After a Middle Sunday that was dominated by clear skies, the rain caused disruptions again as play resumed, sporadically. Tommy Haas withdrew from the tournament, leaving Roger Federer with a bye to the Quarter Finals. French Open finalists Justine Henin and Ana Ivanovic both progressed. The Williams sisters also came through, with Serena battling through cramp to win a three-set thriller.
8	Despite almost unceasing rain, Nicole Vaidišová upset Amélie Mauresmo (the defending champion) 7–6, 4–6, 6–1 to create a quarterfinal with Ana Ivanovic. The match between Rafael Nadal and Robin Söderling failed to reach a conclusion, as play was delayed by rain and forced into a fourth day.
9	The highly anticipated match between Serena Williams and Justine Henin was fought out, with Henin victorious in three sets. Venus Williams brushed aside the number 2 seed Maria Sharapova; and Marion Bartoli, a surprise package, also progressed to the semifinals. Rafael Nadal and Novak Djokovic won their third round matches, which had both been forced into five days of play. Andy Roddick and Richard Gasquet also reached the fourth round.
10	Rain prevented play in the afternoon and evening. Rafael Nadal came back from 2–0 to win against Mikhail Youzhny; setting up a clash with Tomáš Berdych. The "previous" that he and Nadal have refers to a match at the Madrid Masters, where Berdych defeated Nadal and began hushing the crowd. Marcos Baghdatis and Novak Djokovic also set up a quarterfinal tie. Roger Federer returned to court against Juan Carlos Ferrero, but did not have enough time to complete a set. Venus Williams sent another top-seeded Russian packing, Svetlana Kuznetsova; she will meet Ana Ivanovic in the semifinal, who won an epic match against Nicole Vaidišová.
11	Marion Bartoli produced the biggest upset of the tournament by defeating world number 1 and favourite Justine Henin. She faces Venus Williams in the final, who defeated Ana Ivanovic with cool efficiency. Novak Djokovic contested another gruelling match, winning in five sets against Marcos Baghdatis. Roger Federer came through, not unscathed though, as he lost his first set of the tournament. Richard Gasquet awaits him, after shocking Andy Roddick in a shocking comeback from two-sets-to-love down.
12	The gruelling schedule of the tournament took its toll on the competitors in the men's semi-final matches. Richard Gasquet pushed Roger Federer in the first set, but the world number one eventually prevailed 7–5, 6–3, 6–4. Novak Djokovic managed to take the first set off Rafael Nadal in the other semi-final match, but an array of injury problems forced him to retire at 6–3, 1–6, 1–4 down, leaving Nadal to progress to the final. In the ladies final, Venus Williams won her fourth Wimbledon title over Marion Bartoli 6–4, 6–1. Venus used hard serves and hard groundstrokes to keep Bartoli at bay. In the award ceremony Bartoli said Venus Williams was unbeatable on grass.
13	Roger Federer and Rafael Nadal were meeting again in this year's Wimbledon final after the clash in the previous year. The match was 7–6, 4–6, 7–6, 1–4 when Nadal had a problem with his right knee. After treatment, he returned in the match to wrap the set 2–6 to force the match to the fifth set; Federer won the set 6–2 and with it, the match, 7–6, 4–6, 7–6, 2–6, 6–2. Roger won the Wimbledon title for the fifth time and he equaled the record of Björn Borg.

== Notable stories ==
=== Comebacks ===
- Martina Hingis had to save two match points against British wild card Naomi Cavaday on Day 1, almost repeating her first-round exit from the 2001 championships. Hingis eventually went on to win the match 6–7, 7–5, 6–0.
- Janko Tipsarević beat Fernando González 6–3, 3–6, 6–3, 4–6, 8–6 to advance to the fourth round. Tipsarević was ranked 64 and González was seeded 5 but ranked 6, and saved a match point over González.
- Tim Henman defeated Carlos Moyá in round 1 after going down two sets to one in a match that lasted two days with a 5th set scoreline of 13–11. Henman failed to convert 6 match points before capitalizing from a double fault by Moya on the 7th match point.
- Juan Carlos Ferrero also came back, this time from two sets to none down in a match suspended for 2 days, 7–5 in the 5th set against Jan Hájek.
- Nikolay Davydenko made a remarkable comeback against Chris Guccione in round 2, losing the first 2 sets before winning 3–6, 5–7, 7–6, 6–4, 6–2. It was a special comeback because Davydenko, who had a previous horrific record on grass, made it into round 3 of Wimbledon for the first time.
- Serena Williams made an unbelievable comeback against Daniela Hantuchová in the fourth round. Williams cramped in the second set at 5–5, 30–15 with Hantuchová serving. She was treated and played to a tiebreak when a rain delay halted play for almost 2 hours. Both players came back and finished the tiebreak, which Hantuchová won. Then in the third set, Williams started off slow but powered to a 6–2, 6–7, 6–2 win to advance to the quarterfinals against Justine Henin.
- Venus Williams was almost knocked out by Alla Kudryavtseva in her first round match, when she won 2–6, 6–3, 7–5. She was down a set and possible break points before finally winning her match in three sets.
- Venus Williams came back from one set all to win a match tightly against Akiko Morigami 6–2, 3–6, 7–5. Morigami had been a game away from victory, but Venus was able to take control and dismiss Morigami.
- Nicole Vaidišová knocked out defending champion Amélie Mauresmo in the fourth round to reach her first Wimbledon quarterfinal. After narrowly winning a first set tie-break and losing the second set to the title holder, Vaidišová came back to win 6–1 in the third set.
- Marion Bartoli beat world number one Justine Henin in the women's singles semi-final after losing the first set 6–1 and being a break down in the second. She won the final set 6–1.
- Ai Sugiyama and Katarina Srebotnik beat the top seeds Lisa Raymond and Samantha Stosur 1–6, 6–3, 6–2 after being down 6–1, 3–0 in the ladies' doubles semifinal. This was Srebotnik's first Wimbledon final and Sugiyama's fifth.
- Ana Ivanovic defeated Nicole Vaidišová 4–6, 6–2, 7–5 having been down a break in the second set and saving three match points at 3–5 down in the third set.

=== Day-by-day summaries ===
==== Day 1 ====
Many matches were cancelled by rain, an ominous precursor to the entire tournament. Top seeds Roger Federer and Justine Henin managed to defeat their opponents easily. Philipp Kohlschreiber became the first seeded player to exit the tournament. Seeded players Martina Hingis and Patty Schnyder were pushed by their opponents, each playing 3 sets with Hingis saving 2 match points. Serena Williams, Marion Bartoli and Shahar Pe'er won their games simply.

- Seeded players out: Philipp Kohlschreiber

==== Day 2 ====
Daniela Hantuchová easily dispatched Anastasia Pavlyuchenkova. Favourites such as Jelena Janković, Maria Sharapova, Amélie Mauresmo, Novak Djokovic, James Blake and Rafael Nadal won their matches with ease. However, Venus Williams was almost knocked out by Alla Kudryavtseva, when she won 2–6, 6–3, 7–5.

- Seeded players out: Dominik Hrbatý, Carlos Moyá, Filippo Volandri, Juan Mónaco and Olga Puchkova

==== Day 3 ====
Andy Roddick and Richard Gasquet advanced towards third round, true to expectations. Justine Henin, Ana Ivanovic, Martina Hingis and Serena Williams also beat their opponents with little difficulty. Lucky loser Alizé Cornet defeated ranked number 42 Maria Kirilenko. Unfortunately the evening matches were delayed due to the rain.

- Seeded players out: Samantha Stosur, Anabel Medina Garrigues and Sybille Bammer

==== Day 4 ====
Dinara Safina became today's highest-ranked woman to lose, while Tommy Robredo the highest-ranked man to lose on day 4. However, other seeded players like Ana Ivanovic, Elena Dementieva, Roger Federer and Marat Safin have done their jobs well and advanced towards third round. Also, Serena and Venus Williams returned to their doubles competitions by beating Anne Keothavong and Claire Curran in the first round.

- Seeded players out: Tatiana Golovin, Francesca Schiavone, Tathiana Garbin, Martina Müller, Dinara Safina, Juan Ignacio Chela, David Ferrer, Tommy Robredo and Agustín Calleri
- Doubles seeds out: Jeff Coetzee / Rogier Wassen, Yves Allegro / Jim Thomas; Vania King / Jelena Kostanić Tošić

==== Day 5 ====
The players who began their games at 11 o'clock were delayed by rain, but it did not affect Justine Henin, Jelena Janković and Patty Schnyder who all hastily completed their matches. Anna Chakvetadze is the highest-ranked woman to lose so far, while Fernando González became the highest-seeded man to lose so far.

- Seeded players out: Alona Bondarenko, Lucie Šafářová, Anna Chakvetadze, Shahar Pe'er, Martina Hingis, Katarina Srebotnik, Fernando González, Ivan Ljubičić, Dmitry Tursunov, James Blake and Marat Safin
- Doubles seeds out: Simon Aspelin / Julian Knowle, Jonas Björkman / Max Mirnyi, Ashley Fisher / Tripp Phillips, Jonathan Erlich / Andy Ram; Dinara Safina / Roberta Vinci, Maria Elena Camerin / Gisela Dulko, Vera Dushevina / Tatiana Perebiynis, Tathiana Garbin / Paola Suárez

==== Day 6 ====
The tournament suffered massive rain disruptions, with Amélie Mauresmo and Maria Sharapova being the only singles players to complete (and win) their matches. The afternoon matches were also delayed by rain. Fans on Centre and Court 2 received full refunds; because they saw less than an hour of play, with Mauresmo's win lasting 57 minutes.

- Seeded players out: Mara Santangelo and Ai Sugiyama

==== Middle Sunday ====
- Seeded player out: Tommy Haas (injury)

==== Day 7 ====
There was a little bit of rain and a few surprises too. Although there was more rain, Justine Henin found time to advance to the quarterfinals, while Elena Dementieva surprised everyone by losing to an unseeded Tamira Paszek. Agnieszka Radwańska, after sending seeded Martina Müller out in the second round a few days earlier, couldn't do the same thing to Svetlana Kuznetsova. In a highly intense match, Serena Williams cramped against Daniela Hantuchová late in a second set. Serena battled the injury, losing the second set tie-break but winning after a rain delay.

- Seeded players out: Patty Schnyder, Elena Dementieva, Daniela Hantuchová, David Nalbandian and Jarkko Nieminen
- Doubles seeds out: Mariusz Fyrstenberg / Marcin Matkowski, Martín García / Sebastián Prieto

==== Day 8 ====
Most of the women's 4th round matches were delayed by rain, however, some matches were completed; Svetlana Kuznetsova ended Tamira Paszek's dazzling run; 3rd seed and in-form Serb Jelena Janković was defeated by Marion Bartoli; and 2006 champion and 4th seed Amélie Mauresmo fell to Nicole Vaidišová.

- Seeded players out: Amélie Mauresmo, Nadia Petrova, Jelena Janković and Guillermo Cañas

==== Day 9 ====
Rafael Nadal finally won his match against Robin Söderling, which had lasted since Saturday. Other winners today included Novak Djokovic, who advanced into 4th round and Andy Roddick, who is already in the quarterfinals. Richard Gasquet won his match against Jo-Wilfried Tsonga. Maria Sharapova lost to Venus Williams in straight sets 6–1, 6–3 in one of the biggest upsets of the tournament. Justine Henin and Marion Bartoli became the first female semifinalists. The second round doubles match between Brazilians André Sá and Marcelo Melo against Paul Hanley and Kevin Ullyett set two Wimbledon records; the most games played in a match (102) and the longest fifth set ever (28–26). This was the second longest match in the history of The Championships, at 5 hours and 58 minutes. The Brazilian duo won.

- Seeded players out: Maria Sharapova, Michaëlla Krajicek, Serena Williams and Robin Söderling
- Doubles seeds out: Jaroslav Levinský / David Škoch, Paul Hanley / Kevin Ullyett; Chan Yung-jan / Chuang Chia-jung, Maria Kirilenko / Elena Vesnina, Sania Mirza / Shahar Pe'er; Mike Bryan / Lisa Raymond, Simon Aspelin / Mara Santangelo, Jonathan Erlich / Elena Vesnina, Kevin Ullyett / Liezel Huber

==== Day 10 ====
Venus Williams became another semifinalist after her victory over Svetlana Kuznetsova in straight sets again. Ana Ivanovic joined her when she won the match with Nicole Vaidišová, who could not take advantage of three match points she had in the final set, with Ivanovic eventually triumphing 7–5. Novak Djokovic, Marcos Baghdatis, Tomáš Berdych and Rafael Nadal qualified into quarterfinals today. Nadal battled through another 5-set match, although he completed this one on its scheduled day, without any suspensions due to rain.

- Seeded players out: Svetlana Kuznetsova, Nicole Vaidišová, Nikolay Davydenko, Jonas Björkman, Mikhail Youzhny and Lleyton Hewitt
- Doubles seeds out: Anabel Medina Garrigues / Virginia Ruano Pascual; Rogier Wassen / Chan Yung-jan, Bob Bryan / Samantha Stosur, Mark Knowles / Yan Zi

==== Day 11 ====
Rafael Nadal became the first male semifinalist, and was soon followed by defending champion Roger Federer and by fourth seed Novak Djokovic. Venus Williams is through to the ladies' singles final and Frenchwoman Marion Bartoli joins her making the biggest upset in the tournament, sending number one seeded Justine Henin out. Richard Gasquet, another French player, pulled off the biggest upset of the men's in taking out #3 seed and ranked Roddick. Roddick had a two-set lead before Gasquet won the final 3 sets to book a semifinal spot.

- Seeded players out: Ana Ivanovic, Justine Henin, Tomáš Berdych, Juan Carlos Ferrero, Marcos Baghdatis and Andy Roddick
- Doubles seeds out: Lukáš Dlouhý / Pavel Vízner, Mark Knowles / Daniel Nestor, Martin Damm / Leander Paes; Janette Husárová / Meghann Shaughnessy, Květa Peschke / Rennae Stubbs, Elena Likhovtseva / Sun Tiantian; Andy Ram / Nathalie Dechy, Paul Hanley / Tatiana Perebiynis, Todd Perry / Chia-Jung Chuang, Julian Knowle / Sun Tiantian

==== Day 12 ====
The final of the men's singles was determined, Roger Federer vs. Rafael Nadal, a repeat of the 2006 final and French Open final. Federer won in straight sets against Richard Gasquet, whilst Nadal's opponent, Novak Djokovic, was forced to retire with the match balanced at one set all. Venus Williams won another Wimbledon title against Bartoli in straight sets (6–4, 6–1).

- Seeded players out: Marion Bartoli, Richard Gasquet and Novak Djokovic
- Doubles seeds out: Fabrice Santoro / Nenad Zimonjić; Lisa Raymond / Samantha Stosur, Alicia Molik / Mara Santangelo; Leander Paes / Meghann Shaughnessy, Daniel Nestor / Elena Likhovtseva, Marcin Matkowski / Cara Black, Pavel Vízner / Květa Peschke

==== Day 13 ====
Roger Federer won his fifth consecutive Wimbledon title after a five-set battle against Rafael Nadal, 3 sets to 2. Federer's supremacy on grass met a strong challenge from Nadal and the victory did not come easily for the Swiss. But Federer came through by winning the tiebreak in the first and third sets, and faced four break points before victory in the final set. Arnaud Clément and Michaël Llodra, beating number one seeded Bryan brothers, became the Gentlemen's doubles champions, while Cara Black and Liezel Huber were victorious in the Ladies' doubles final. Jamie Murray became the first British player to win a senior Wimbledon title in 20 years by winning the Mixed doubles with Serbian partner Jelena Janković, beating Jonas Björkman and Alicia Molik in 3 sets. Urszula Radwańska maintained the family tradition winning the Girls' singles title like her sister Agnieszka in 2005 and they became the first sisters to win it. Urszula also became the Girls' doubles champion, playing with Anastasia Pavlyuchenkova. The victor of Boys' singles was Donald Young and the best boys' doubles team was Daniel Lopez and Matteo Trevisan.

- Seeded player out: Rafael Nadal
- Doubles seeds out: Bob Bryan / Mike Bryan; Katarina Srebotnik / Ai Sugiyama; Jonas Björkman / Alicia Molik

== Singles seeds ==
=== Men's singles ===
1. (Switzerland) Roger Federer (champion)
2. (Spain) Rafael Nadal (final, lost to Roger Federer)
3. (United States) Andy Roddick (quarterfinals, lost to Richard Gasquet)
4. (Serbia) Novak Djokovic (semifinals, retired against Rafael Nadal due to foot injury)
5. (Chile) Fernando González (third round, lost to Janko Tipsarević)
6. (Russia) Nikolay Davydenko (fourth round, lost to Marcos Baghdatis)
7. (Czech Republic) Tomáš Berdych (quarterfinals, lost to Rafael Nadal)
8. (United Kingdom) Andy Murray (withdrew due to wrist injury)
9. (United States) James Blake (third round, lost to Juan Carlos Ferrero)
10. (Cyprus) Marcos Baghdatis (quarterfinals, lost to Novak Djokovic)
11. (Spain) Tommy Robredo (second round, lost to Wayne Arthurs)
12. (France) Richard Gasquet (semifinals, lost to Roger Federer)
13. (Germany) Tommy Haas (fourth round, withdrew due to injury)
14. (Russia) Mikhail Youzhny (fourth round, lost to Rafael Nadal)
15. (Croatia) Ivan Ljubičić (third round, lost to Paul-Henri Mathieu)
16. (Australia) Lleyton Hewitt (fourth round, lost to Novak Djokovic)
17. (Spain) David Ferrer (second round, lost to Paul-Henri Mathieu)
18. (Finland) Jarkko Nieminen (third round, lost to Mikhail Youzhny)
19. (Sweden) Jonas Björkman (fourth round, lost to Tomáš Berdych)
20. (Spain) Juan Carlos Ferrero (quarterfinals, lost to Roger Federer)
21. (Russia) Dmitry Tursunov (third round, lost to Tommy Haas)
22. (Argentina) Guillermo Cañas (third round, lost to Lleyton Hewitt)
23. (Argentina) David Nalbandian (third round, lost to Marcos Baghdatis)
24. (Argentina) Juan Ignacio Chela (second round, lost to Édouard Roger-Vasselin)
25. (Spain) Carlos Moyá (first round, lost to Tim Henman)
26. (Russia) Marat Safin (third round, lost to Roger Federer)
27. (Germany) Philipp Kohlschreiber (first round, lost to Florent Serra)
28. (Sweden) Robin Söderling (third round, lost to Rafael Nadal)
29. (Argentina) Agustín Calleri (second round, lost to Lee Hyung-taik)
30. (Italy) Filippo Volandri (first round, lost to Nicolas Kiefer)
31. (Slovakia) Dominik Hrbatý (first round, lost to Andreas Seppi)
32. (Argentina) Juan Mónaco (first round, lost to Kristof Vliegen)

=== Women's singles ===
1. (Belgium) Justine Henin (semifinals, lost to Marion Bartoli)
2. (Russia) Maria Sharapova (fourth round, lost to Venus Williams)
3. (Serbia) Jelena Janković (fourth round, lost to Marion Bartoli)
4. (France) Amélie Mauresmo (fourth round, lost to Nicole Vaidišová)
5. (Russia) Svetlana Kuznetsova (quarterfinals, lost to Venus Williams)
6. (Serbia) Ana Ivanovic (semifinals, lost to Venus Williams)
7. (United States) Serena Williams (quarterfinals, lost to Justine Henin)
8. (Russia) Anna Chakvetadze (third round, lost to Michaëlla Krajicek)
9. (Switzerland) Martina Hingis (third round, lost to Laura Granville)
10. (Slovakia) Daniela Hantuchová (fourth round, lost to Serena Williams)
11. (Russia) Nadia Petrova (fourth round, lost to Ana Ivanovic)
12. (Russia) Elena Dementieva (third round, lost to Tamira Paszek)
13. (Russia) Dinara Safina (second round, lost to Akiko Morigami)
14. (Czech Republic) Nicole Vaidišová (quarterfinals, lost to Ana Ivanovic)
15. (Switzerland) Patty Schnyder (fourth round, lost to Justine Henin)
16. (Israel) Shahar Pe'er (third round, lost to Marion Bartoli)
17. (France) Tatiana Golovin (second round, lost to Tamira Paszek)
18. (France) Marion Bartoli (final, lost to Venus Williams)
19. (Slovenia) Katarina Srebotnik (third round, lost to Daniela Hantuchová)
20. (Austria) Sybille Bammer (second round, lost to Laura Granville)
21. (Italy) Tathiana Garbin (second round, lost to Victoria Azarenka)
22. (Spain) Anabel Medina Garrigues (first round, lost to Virginia Ruano Pascual)
23. (United States) Venus Williams (champion)
24. (Ukraine) Alona Bondarenko (third round, lost to Patty Schnyder)
25. (Czech Republic) Lucie Šafářová (third round, lost to Jelena Janković)
26. (Japan) Ai Sugiyama (third round, lost to Maria Sharapova)
27. (Australia) Samantha Stosur (second round, lost to Milagros Sequera)
28. (Italy) Mara Santangelo (third round, lost to Amélie Mauresmo)
29. (Italy) Francesca Schiavone (second round, lost to Aravane Rezaï)
30. (Russia) Olga Puchkova (first round, lost to Elena Vesnina)
31. (Netherlands) Michaëlla Krajicek (quarterfinals, lost to Marion Bartoli)
32. (Germany) Martina Müller (second round, lost to Agnieszka Radwańska)

== Wild card entries ==
The following players received wild cards into the main draw senior events.

Men's singles

1. (United Kingdom) Jamie Baker
2. (United Kingdom) Richard Bloomfield
3. (United Kingdom) Alex Bogdanovic
4. (Croatia) Marin Čilić
5. (Netherlands) Thiemo de Bakker
6. (United Kingdom) Josh Goodall
7. (United Kingdom) Jonathan Marray
8. (France) Jo-Wilfried Tsonga

Women's singles

1. (United Kingdom) Elena Baltacha
2. (United Kingdom) Naomi Cavaday
3. (United Kingdom) Anne Keothavong
4. (Ukraine) Viktoriya Kutuzova
5. (United Kingdom) Katie O'Brien
6. (Russia) Anastasia Pavlyuchenkova
7. (United Kingdom) Melanie South
8. (Denmark) Caroline Wozniacki

Men's doubles

1. (United Kingdom) Jamie Baker / (United Kingdom) Alex Bogdanovic
2. (United Kingdom) Neil Bamford / (United Kingdom) Jim May
3. (United Kingdom) Richard Bloomfield / (United Kingdom) Jonathan Marray
4. (United Kingdom) Lee Childs / (United Kingdom) Jamie Delgado
5. (United Kingdom) Josh Goodall / (United Kingdom) Ross Hutchins

Women's doubles

1. (United Kingdom) Elena Baltacha / (United Kingdom) Naomi Cavaday
2. (United Kingdom) Sarah Borwell / (United Kingdom) Jade Curtis
3. (United Kingdom) Claire Curran / (United Kingdom) Anne Keothavong
4. (United Kingdom) Karen Paterson / (United Kingdom) Melanie South
5. (United States) Serena Williams / (United States) Venus Williams

Mixed doubles

1. (United Kingdom) James Auckland / (United Kingdom) Claire Curran
2. (United Kingdom) Alex Bogdanovic / (United Kingdom) Melanie South
3. (United Kingdom) Richard Bloomfield / (United Kingdom) Sarah Borwell
4. (United Kingdom) Lee Childs / (United Kingdom) Katie O'Brien
5. (United Kingdom) Jamie Delgado / (United Kingdom) Anne Keothavong

== Qualifier entries ==
=== Men's singles ===
1. (Chinese Taipei) Wang Yeu-tzuoo
2. (France) Nicolas Mahut
3. (France) Édouard Roger-Vasselin
4. (Pakistan) Aisam-ul-Haq Qureshi
5. (United States) Bobby Reynolds
6. (Czech Republic) Bohdan Ulihrach
7. (United States) Sam Warburg
8. (United States) Zack Fleishman
9. (United Kingdom) Lee Childs
10. (Colombia) Alejandro Falla
11. (Luxembourg) Gilles Müller
12. (South Africa) Rik de Voest
13. (Australia) Wayne Arthurs
14. (Germany) Mischa Zverev
15. (Spain) Fernando Vicente
16. (Czech Republic) Tomáš Zíb

The following players received entry into the lucky loser spot:

1. (Canada) Frank Dancevic
2. (United States) Kevin Kim

=== Women's singles ===
1. (Hungary) Ágnes Szávay
2. (Puerto Rico) Kristina Brandi
3. (Australia) Casey Dellacqua
4. (Croatia) Nika Ožegović
5. (Argentina) Jorgelina Cravero
6. (Japan) Ayumi Morita
7. (Belarus) Olga Govortsova
8. (Chinese Taipei) Hsieh Su-wei
9. (Ukraine) Tatiana Perebiynis
10. (Czech Republic) Hana Šromová
11. (China) Yan Zi
12. (Czech Republic) Barbora Záhlavová-Strýcová

The following player received entry into the lucky loser spot:

1. (France) Alizé Cornet

=== Men's doubles ===
1. (United States) Scott Lipsky / (United States) David Martin
2. (Israel) Harel Levy / (United States) Rajeev Ram
3. (Serbia) Ilija Bozoljac / (Belgium) Dick Norman
4. (United States) Alex Kuznetsov / (Germany) Mischa Zverev

The following teams received entry into the lucky loser spot:

1. (Germany) Lars Burgsmüller / (Ukraine) Orest Tereshchuk
2. (Thailand) Sanchai Ratiwatana / (Thailand) Sonchat Ratiwatana
3. (United States) Kevin Kim / (Australia) Robert Smeets

=== Women's doubles ===
1. (Chinese Taipei) Hsieh Su-wei / (Russia) Alla Kudryavtseva
2. (United States) Julie Ditty / (United States) Raquel Kops-Jones
3. (France) Stéphanie Foretz / (Tunisia) Selima Sfar
4. (Sweden) Sofia Arvidsson / (United States) Lilia Osterloh

The following teams received entry into the lucky loser spot:

1. (Czech Republic) Andrea Hlaváčková / (Germany) Sandra Klösel
2. (Czech Republic) Hana Šromová / (Czech Republic) Klára Zakopalová
3. (United Kingdom) Anna Fitzpatrick / (United Kingdom) Emily Webley-Smith

== Protected ranking ==
The following players were accepted directly into the main draw using a protected ranking:

Men's singles

- (Russia) Igor Andreev
- (United States) Justin Gimelstob
- (Germany) Nicolas Kiefer

== Withdrawn players ==
=== Men's singles ===
- (Argentina) José Acasuso → replaced by (Chinese Taipei) Lu Yen-hsun
- (Croatia) Mario Ančić → replaced by (Canada) Frank Dancevic
- (Argentina) Gastón Gaudio → replaced by (Argentina) Juan Pablo Guzmán
- (Belgium) Xavier Malisse → replaced by (Germany) Michael Berrer
- (Austria) Jürgen Melzer → replaced by (Spain) Iván Navarro
- (United Kingdom) Andy Murray → replaced by (United States) Kevin Kim
- (Thailand) Paradorn Srichaphan → replaced by (Italy) Davide Sanguinetti

=== Women's singles ===
- (China) Li Na → replaced by (France) Alizé Cornet
- (Russia) Anastasia Myskina → replaced by (Israel) Anna Smashnova
- (Italy) Romina Oprandi → replaced by (Hungary) Melinda Czink
- (China) Zheng Jie → replaced by (Colombia) Catalina Castaño
- (Russia) Vera Zvonareva → replaced by (Canada) Aleksandra Wozniak

== Media coverage ==
Broadcasters of the 2007 Wimbledon Championships were as follows:

=== Europe ===
- Belgium – VRT, RTL-TVI
- Bosnia and Herzegovina – OBN
- Bulgaria – Diema Vision Plc
- Croatia – HRT TV
- Czech Republic – ČT4
- Denmark – TV 2 Sport
- Finland – MTV3, MTV3 MAX
- France – Canal+ (Sport Plus)
- Georgia – First Channel
- Germany – DSF, Premiere
- Greece – Supersport
- Hungary – Sport1
- Ireland – TG4
- Italy – Sky Sport
- Macedonia – MKRTV
- Malta – Melita Cable
- Montenegro – TVCG
- Netherlands – RTL 7
- Norway – NRK, Sport Expressen
- Poland – Polsat
- Portugal – Sport TV
- Romania – Sport.ro
- Russia – NTV Plus
- Serbia – RTS, Sport Klub, TV Koha
- Slovenia – RTV
- Spain – Canal+ (Sogecable)
- Sweden – Sport Expressen
- Switzerland – SRG/SSR TV
- Turkey – Media Eye
- United Kingdom – BBC

=== Worldwide ===
- Australia – Nine Network, Fox Sports (Fox Sports 1, Fox Sports 2)
- Canada – Global, TSN, RDS
- Japan – NHK, Gaora
- New Zealand – Sky Network, Prime
- South Africa – SuperSport
- United States – ESPN (ESPN2), NBC, Tapesh
- Israel – Sport 5 (including Sport 5+ and Sport 5+ Live)
- Iran – IRIB
- Asia – ESPN Star Sports, BBTV Thailand
- Latin America – ESPN Sur, ESPN 2
- Middle East – ART
- South America – Globosat (Brazil)
- Other – Fiji TV

== See also ==
- 2007 in tennis

Preceded by 2007 French Open	Grand Slams	Succeeded by 2007 US Open
