= 2007 French Open =

- Date: 27 May – 10 June 2007
- Edition: 106
- Category: 77th Grand Slam (ITF)
- Surface: Clay
- Location: Paris (XVI^{e}), France
- Venue: Stade Roland Garros

Champions

Men's singles
- (Spain) Rafael Nadal

Women's singles
- (Belgium) Justine Henin

Men's doubles
- (The Bahamas) Mark Knowles / (Canada) Daniel Nestor

Women's doubles
- (Australia) Alicia Molik / (Italy) Mara Santangelo

Mixed doubles
- (France) Nathalie Dechy / (Israel) Andy Ram

Wheelchair men's singles
- (Japan) Shingo Kunieda

Wheelchair women's singles
- (Netherlands) Esther Vergeer

Wheelchair men's doubles
- (France) Stéphane Houdet / (France) Michaël Jérémiasz

Wheelchair women's doubles
- (Netherlands) Maaike Smit / (Netherlands) Esther Vergeer

Boys' singles
- (Belarus) Vladimir Ignatic

Girls' singles
- (France) Alizé Cornet

Boys' doubles
- (Italy) Thomas Fabbiano / (Belarus) Andrei Karatchenia

Girls' doubles
- (Belarus) Ksenia Milevskaya / (Poland) Urszula Radwańska

Legends under 45 doubles
- (France) Arnaud Boetsch / (France) Guy Forget

Legends over 45 doubles
- (Sweden) Anders Järryd / (United States) John McEnroe
← 2006 ·	French Open	· 2008 →

The 2007 French Open (Roland Garros) was held in Paris, France from 27 May through to 10 June 2007. Rafael Nadal became the first man to win the tournament 3 times consecutively since Björn Borg, 1978–81; and maintained his unbeaten run at Roland Garros. Justine Henin also equaled Monica Seles' record of three consecutive wins. This was the third straight year that Rafael Nadal and Justine Henin won the French Open singles titles.

== Timeline ==
Day	Summary	Highlights^{1}	Completed play
	2007 Roland Garros Timeline		
1	The tournament was almost entirely rained out. However, some matches were completed, and Janko Tipsarević, Serena Williams, and Marat Safin were victors. Safin started as the first winner of the 2007 season.	1	2
2	Again, most of the day's play didn't happen. Rain postponed first round action, however, Venus Williams was one of the few winners on that day.	1	2
3	Day 3 finally prevailed dry. Most of the 64 men's singles first round matches were completed, as well as a few women's victories. Dominik Hrbatý, Julien Benneteau, Florian Mayer, Fernando González, Robin Söderling and Agustín Calleri were other upset seeds on the men's side, and Nadia Petrova was one of the major upsets on the women's side.	1	2
4	On Day 4, a lot of women's matches were played. The remaining of the men's matches were finished and some of the women's winners were Maria Sharapova, Amélie Mauresmo and Venus Williams.	1	2
5	Day 5 saw the start of women's, men's and mixed doubles competitions. In addition, Gastón Gaudio, the 2004 champion, was up 6–4, 6–3 on fourteenth-seeded and former number one Lleyton Hewitt, but ended up losing the match in five sets. Hewitt came from behind two sets to defeat Gaudio.	1	2
6	On Day 6, Jelena Janković ousted Venus Williams 6–4, 4–6, 6–1. A repeat of last year's mixed doubles final came this year in the first round, and the defending champions Katarina Srebotnik and Nenad Zimonjić beat last year's runner-up team Elena Likhovtseva and Daniel Nestor in three sets, 6–2, 5–7, 10–7. Filippo Volandri, seeded 29th, at the time the most recent person who defeated number one Roger Federer, upset the 7th seed Ivan Ljubičić 6–4, 6–7, 4–6, 6–3, 6–4, and he will play Tommy Robredo in the fourth round.	1	2
7	Lucie Šafářová upset Amélie Mauresmo for the second consecutive time at a major before the quarterfinals. Serbian Novak Djokovic and last French male representative Olivier Patience battled in a marathon five-set long match that resulted in the qualification of Djokovic, although he himself confessed that "his opponent had played better than him." According to the NBC French Open coverage, Albert Montañés and defending champion Rafael Nadal battled over ten deuces in one of the games in the first set.	1	2
8	The women's fourth round was played out. The four quarterfinals are between Justine Henin, and Serena Williams, between Jelena Janković and Nicole Vaidišová, between Ana Ivanovic and Svetlana Kuznetsova, and lastly between Anna Chakvetadze and Maria Sharapova, of whom saved two match points against Patty Schnyder today. Two quarterfinal matches in the men's draw have been made, where Roger Federer will play Tommy Robredo, and Guillermo Cañas will play Nikolay Davydenko.	1	2
9	The men's quarterfinals took shape. Rafael Nadal beat Lleyton Hewitt 6–3 6–1 7–6(5) and will face Carlos Moyá. The doubles and juniors tournaments also continued. Marcos Baghdatis was knocked out by Igor Andreev, of whom will meet Novak Djokovic in a quarterfinal.	1	2
10	The first of the quarterfinals were completed. For the men, Roger Federer defeated Tommy Robredo in four sets, marking his first set lost in a Grand Slam since the 2006 US Open final. Also winning his match was Nikolay Davydenko, who beat Guillermo Cañas. On the women's side, Ana Ivanovic defeated Svetlana Kuznetsova; Justine Henin took out Serena Williams; Jelena Janković beat Nicole Vaidišová, and Maria Sharapova was victorious over Anna Chakvetadze.	1	2
11	The final two men's quarterfinals were played, with Rafael Nadal defeating fellow Mallorcan Carlos Moyá; and Novak Djokovic beating surprise quarter-finalist Igor Andreev.	1	2
12	Ana Ivanovic made her first Grand Slam singles final, and any Grand Slam final of any type, when she beat Maria Sharapova. Justine Henin beat Jelena Janković, and Ana Ivanovic and Justine Henin will meet in the final.	1	2
13	Roger Federer and Rafael Nadal have made the finals, both for the second consecutive time. Federer beat Nikolay Davydenko and Rafael Nadal beat Novak Djokovic.	1	2
14	Justine Henin defeats Ana Ivanovic in straight sets to capture the women's singles championship.	1	2
15	Rafael Nadal beats Roger Federer in 4 sets to win the men's singles title for the 3rd consecutive year at the French Open.	1	2
	Roland Garros Homepage		

== Notable stories ==
=== Day-by-day summaries ===
==== Day 1 ====
Most of the day's matches were canceled due to rain. Serena Williams and Justine Henin both won on the women's side. Marat Safin won his match, and was the 2007 French Open's first victor. Other winners include Dinara Safina, Tamira Paszek, Potito Starace and Janko Tipsarević.

==== Day 2 ====
Most of the day was again canceled due to rain. However, Venus Williams, Michaëlla Krajicek and Nikolay Davydenko were amongst that day's winners.

==== Day 3 ====
The third day saw almost the entire men's draw completed, with only seven of 64 matches yet to play. The top half of the women's singles draw also completed their action. The Americans struggled; only two of the eleven Americans in action are still in the tournament, one of nine men and one of two women. The only American woman to advance was Shenay Perry, who survived a loss of the first set against Olivia Sanchez. The other American man still in the tournament was Robby Ginepri, who didn't even advance yet. He split sets with Diego Hartfield before play was suspended. Spanish players enjoyed the opposite fortune, with six of eight men and the only woman all winning their matches. Ernests Gulbis, who became the first Latvian man in the main draw of a Grand Slam, saw off Britain's only representative, Tim Henman.

The longest match of the men's singles draw was Philipp Kohlschreiber's clash with Lukáš Dlouhý where the fifth set was eventually taken by Kohlschreiber, 17–15. Eight male seeds left the tournament:

- Andy Roddick (3) lost 6–3, 4–6, 3–6, 4–6 to Igor Andreev.
- Fernando González (5) lost 2–6, 2–6, 4–6 to former top ten player Radek Štěpánek.
- James Blake (8) lost 6–4, 4–6, 5–7, 5–7 to Ivo Karlović.
- Dominik Hrbatý (24) lost 2–6, 7–5, 7–6(3), 4–6, 3–6 to Czech qualifier Bohdan Ulihrach.
- Robin Söderling (25) retired after being a set and 1–4 down in the second set to Albert Montañés.
- Agustín Calleri (26) lost in four sets to lucky loser Mariano Zabaleta 4–6, 7–6(5), 6–7(5), 5–7.
- Julien Benneteau (30) lost in four to Carlos Berlocq.
- Florian Mayer (31) lost to Paul-Henri Mathieu in straight sets.

Also, the injured Russian eleventh seed Nadia Petrova went out 5–7, 7–5, 0–6 to Květa Peschke. Nicole Vaidišová and Jelena Janković defeated their opponents in straight sets.

==== Day 4 ====
Tenth seed Tomáš Berdych failed to turn his overnight two-set deficit against Guillermo García López, and became the ninth men's seed to bow out in the first round. The conqueror of Fernando González, Radek Štěpánek, lost in five sets to wildcard Édouard Roger-Vasselin in the second round. Justine Henin, Serena Williams, Venus Williams, Maria Sharapova and Amélie Mauresmo won through as well. The unseeded Kristof Vliegen was able to beat eleventh seed Richard Gasquet in straight sets, 7–6(4), 6–3, 6–1.

==== Day 5 ====
Gastón Gaudio, the 2004 champion, was up 6–4, 6–3 on fourteenth-seeded and former number one Lleyton Hewitt, but ended up losing the match in five sets. Hewitt came from behind two sets to defeat Gaudio. Also, Maria Sharapova, Rafael Nadal, Serena Williams and other players advanced, however rain once again stopped play around 6 P.M. Andreea Ehritt-Vanc and Anastasia Rodionova were amongst the first to win their doubles match today.

==== Day 6 ====
On Day 6, a repeat of last year's mixed doubles final came when Katarina Srebotnik and Nenad Zimonjić beat Elena Likhovtseva and Daniel Nestor 6–2, 5–7, 10–7 in the first round. Number four seed Jelena Janković beat Venus Williams 6–4, 4–6, 6–1 in the third round. Filippo Volandri, seeded 29th, then the most recent person who defeated Roger Federer (at the 2007 Rome Masters), upset the 7th seed Ivan Ljubičić 6–4, 6–7, 4–6, 6–3, 6–4 in the third round, and he will play Tommy Robredo in the fourth round, which is his best French Open of his career.

==== Day 7 ====
On Day 7, there was no rain delay. According to coverage on NBC, a game in the first set between Rafael Nadal and Albert Montañés went to over ten deuces, and thirty two points. Today, number five seed Amélie Mauresmo lost to Lucie Šafářová for the second time at a major in a row.

==== Day 8 ====
On Day 8, the women's quarterfinal draw took shape. Two men's quarterfinals also took shape, and many matches in doubles and juniors were also played. The four women's quarterfinals are:

- World number 1 Justine Henin against Serena Williams.
- Jelena Janković against Nicole Vaidišová.
- Ana Ivanovic against Svetlana Kuznetsova.
- Anna Chakvetadze against Maria Sharapova, who survived two match points to win 3–6, 6–4, 9–7 over Patty Schnyder, shown on NBC.

The men's quarterfinals that have been formed by winning their fourth round matches are:

- Roger Federer against Tommy Robredo
- Guillermo Cañas against Nikolay Davydenko.

==== Day 9 ====
The last two men's quarterfinals were formed. Junior singles and doubles matches as well as other senior doubles matches were played. The men's quarterfinals are as so:

- Roger Federer (who beat Mikhail Youzhny) against Tommy Robredo (who beat Filippo Volandri)
- Guillermo Cañas (who beat Juan Mónaco) against Nikolay Davydenko (who beat David Nalbandian)
- Igor Andreev (who upset Marcos Baghdatis) against Novak Djokovic (who beat Fernando Verdasco)
- Carlos Moyá (who beat Jonas Björkman) against Rafael Nadal (who beat Lleyton Hewitt).

==== Day 10 ====
In the men's singles quarterfinals, Roger Federer beat Tommy Robredo, and Nikolay Davydenko beat Guillermo Cañas. Federer will meet Davydenko in the semifinals.

==== Day 11 ====
The last men's semifinal was formed. Novak Djokovic beat Igor Andreev, and Rafael Nadal beat Carlos Moyá, and these two winners would take each other on in the semifinals.

==== Day 12 ====
In the women's semifinals Ana Ivanovic beat Maria Sharapova 6–1, 6–2 to make it to her first Grand Slam singles final and Justine Henin beat Jelena Janković, and still hasn't lost a set in over two years at the French Open. The first champions were Nathalie Dechy and Andy Ram after finals victory over the 2006 champions Katarina Srebotnik and Nenad Zimonjić in mixed doubles.

==== Day 13 ====
Finalists of men's singles are Roger Federer (who beat Nikolay Davydenko 7–5, 7–6, 7–6) and Rafael Nadal (who beat Novak Djokovic 7–5, 6–4, 6–2). 17th seeded Alicia Molik and Mara Santangelo beat Katarina Srebotnik and Ai Sugiyama, the seventh seeds, to win the women's doubles championship.

==== Day 14 ====
Justine Henin beat Ana Ivanovic in straight sets, and is the three-time champion who has not lost a set since the 2005 fourth round when she saved match points against Svetlana Kuznetsova. The men's doubles and juniors doubles finals were played.

==== Day 15 ====
Rafael Nadal defeated Roger Federer in 4 sets to win his 3rd straight French Open title. Nadal has now won 3 French Opens. He won all of twenty-one matches playing on Roland Garros. This was also the second consecutive year that Nadal denied Federer winning 4 slams in a row.

== Seniors ==
=== Men's singles ===
(Spain) Rafael Nadal defeated (Switzerland) Roger Federer, 6–3, 4–6, 6–3, 6–4

- It was Nadal's 3rd career Grand Slam title, and his 3rd (consecutive) French Open title.

=== Women's singles ===
(Belgium) Justine Henin defeated (Serbia) Ana Ivanovic, 6–1, 6–2

- It was Henin's 4th title of the year, and her 33rd overall. It was her 6th career Grand Slam title, and her 4th and last French Open title.

=== Men's doubles ===
(The Bahamas) Mark Knowles / (Canada) Daniel Nestor defeated (Czech Republic) Lukáš Dlouhý / (Czech Republic) Pavel Vízner, 2–6, 6–3, 6–4

- It was Knowles' 3rd and last career Grand Slam title, and his only French Open title.
- It was Nestor's 3rd career Grand Slam title, and his first French Open title.

=== Women's doubles ===
(Australia) Alicia Molik / (Italy) Mara Santangelo defeated (Slovenia) Katarina Srebotnik / (Japan) Ai Sugiyama, 7–6^{(7–5)}, 6–4

- It was Molik's 2nd and last career Grand Slam title, and her only French Open title.
- It was Santangelo's 1st and only career Grand Slam title.

=== Mixed doubles ===
(France) Nathalie Dechy / (Israel) Andy Ram defeated (Slovenia) Katarina Srebotnik / (Serbia) Nenad Zimonjić, 7–5, 6–3

== Juniors ==
=== Boys' singles ===
(Belarus) Vladimir Ignatic defeated (Australia) Greg Jones 6–3, 6–4

=== Girls' singles ===
(France) Alizé Cornet defeated (Colombia) Mariana Duque Marino 4–6, 6–1, 6–0

=== Boys' doubles ===
(Italy) Thomas Fabbiano / (Belarus) Andrei Karatchenia defeated (United States) Kellen Damico / (France) Jonathan Eysseric 6–4, 6–0

=== Girls' doubles ===
(Belarus) Ksenia Milevskaya / (Poland) Urszula Radwańska defeated (Romania) Sorana Cîrstea / (United States) Alexa Glatch 6–1, 6–4

== Legends ==
=== Legends under 45 doubles ===
(France) Arnaud Boetsch / (France) Guy Forget defeated (France) Henri Leconte / (France) Cédric Pioline 6–3, 3–6, 1–0(14)

=== Legends over 45 doubles ===
(Sweden) Anders Järryd / (United States) John McEnroe defeated (Australia) John Fitzgerald / (Argentina) Guillermo Vilas 6–1, 6–2

== Wheelchair ==
=== Wheelchair men's singles ===
(Japan) Shingo Kunieda defeated (Netherlands) Robin Ammerlaan 6–3, 6–4

=== Wheelchair women's singles ===
(Netherlands) Esther Vergeer defeated (France) Florence Gravellier 6–3, 5–7, 6–2

=== Wheelchair men's doubles ===
(France) Stéphane Houdet / (France) Michaël Jérémiasz defeated (Japan) Shingo Kunieda / (Japan) Satoshi Saida 7–6^{(7–4)}, 6–1

=== Wheelchair women's doubles ===
(Netherlands) Maaike Smit / (Netherlands) Esther Vergeer defeated (France) Florence Gravellier / (Japan) Mie Yaosa 6–1, 6–4

== Seeds ==
The seeded players are listed below. Players in bold are still in the competition. The players no longer in the tournament are listed with the round in which they exited.

=== Men's singles ===
1. (Switzerland) Roger Federer (final, lost to Rafael Nadal)
2. (Spain) **Rafael Nadal** (champion)
3. (United States) Andy Roddick, (first round, lost to Igor Andreev)
4. (Russia) Nikolay Davydenko, (semifinals, lost to Roger Federer)
5. (Chile) Fernando González, (first round, lost to Radek Štěpánek)
6. (Serbia) Novak Djokovic, (semifinals, lost to Rafael Nadal)
7. (Croatia) Ivan Ljubičić, (third round, lost to Filippo Volandri)
8. (United States) James Blake, (first round, lost to Ivo Karlović)
9. (Spain) Tommy Robredo, (quarterfinals, lost to Roger Federer)
10. (Czech Republic) Tomáš Berdych, (first round, lost to Guillermo García López)
11. (France) Richard Gasquet, (second round, lost to Kristof Vliegen)
12. (Spain) David Ferrer, (third round, lost to Fernando Verdasco)
13. (Russia) Mikhail Youzhny, (fourth round, lost to Roger Federer)
14. (Australia) Lleyton Hewitt, (fourth round, lost to Rafael Nadal)
15. (Argentina) David Nalbandian, (fourth round, lost to Nikolay Davydenko)
16. (Cyprus) Marcos Baghdatis, (fourth round, lost to Igor Andreev)
17. (Spain) Juan Carlos Ferrero, (third round, lost to Mikhail Youzhny)
18. (Argentina) Juan Ignacio Chela, (second round, lost to Gaël Monfils)
19. (Argentina) Guillermo Cañas, (quarterfinals, lost to Nikolay Davydenko)
20. (Finland) Jarkko Nieminen, (third round, lost to Lleyton Hewitt)
21. (Russia) Dmitry Tursunov, (second round, lost to Fernando Verdasco)
22. (Russia) Marat Safin, (second round, lost to Janko Tipsarević)
23. (Spain) Carlos Moyá, (quarterfinals, lost to Rafael Nadal)
24. (Slovakia) Dominik Hrbatý, (first round, lost to Bohdan Ulihrach)
25. (Sweden) Robin Söderling, (first round, lost to Albert Montañés)
26. (Argentina) Agustín Calleri, (first round, lost to Mariano Zabaleta)
27. (Austria) Jürgen Melzer, (second round, lost to Juan Mónaco)
28. (Germany) Philipp Kohlschreiber, (second round, lost to Óscar Hernández)
29. (Italy) Filippo Volandri, (fourth round, lost to Tommy Robredo)
30. (France) Julien Benneteau, (first round, lost to Carlos Berlocq)
31. (Germany) Florian Mayer, (first round, lost to Paul-Henri Mathieu)
32. (Spain) Nicolás Almagro, (second round, lost to Michaël Llodra)

=== Women's singles ===
1. (Belgium) **Justine Henin** (champion)
2. (Russia) Maria Sharapova, (semifinals, lost to Ana Ivanovic)
3. (Russia) Svetlana Kuznetsova, (quarterfinals, lost to Ana Ivanovic)
4. (Serbia) Jelena Janković, (semifinals, lost to Justine Henin)
5. (France) Amélie Mauresmo, (third round, lost to Lucie Šafářová)
6. (Czech Republic) Nicole Vaidišová, (quarterfinals, lost to Jelena Janković)
7. (Serbia) Ana Ivanovic (final, lost to Justine Henin)
8. (United States) Serena Williams, (quarterfinals, lost to Justine Henin)
9. (Russia) Anna Chakvetadze, (quarterfinals, lost to Maria Sharapova)
10. (Russia) Dinara Safina, (fourth round, lost to Serena Williams)
11. (Russia) Nadia Petrova, (first round, lost to Květa Peschke)
12. (Slovakia) Daniela Hantuchová, (third round, lost to Anabel Medina Garrigues)
13. (Russia) Elena Dementieva, (third round, lost to Marion Bartoli)
14. (Switzerland) Patty Schnyder, (fourth round, lost to Maria Sharapova)
15. (Israel) Shahar Pe'er, (fourth round, lost to Svetlana Kuznetsova)
16. (China) Li Na, (third round, lost to Sybille Bammer)
17. (Slovenia) Katarina Srebotnik, (third round, lost to Shahar Pe'er)
18. (France) Marion Bartoli, (fourth round, lost to Jelena Janković)
19. (Italy) Tathiana Garbin, (fourth round, lost to Nicole Vaidišová)
20. (Austria) Sybille Bammer, (fourth round, lost to Justine Henin)
21. (Japan) Ai Sugiyama, (third round, lost to Anna Chakvetadze)
22. (Ukraine) Alona Bondarenko, (second round, lost to Karin Knapp)
23. (Italy) Francesca Schiavone, (third round, lost to Dinara Safina)
24. (Spain) Anabel Medina Garrigues, (fourth round, lost to Ana Ivanovic)
25. (Czech Republic) Lucie Šafářová, (fourth round, lost to Anna Chakvetadze)
26. (United States) Venus Williams, (third round, lost to Jelena Janković)
27. (Australia) Samantha Stosur, (second round, lost to Milagros Sequera)
28. (Italy) Mara Santangelo, (third round, lost to Justine Henin)
29. (Argentina) Gisela Dulko, (second round, lost to Alla Kudryavtseva)
30. (Ukraine) Julia Vakulenko, (first round, lost to Ioana Raluca Olaru)
31. (France) Séverine Brémond, (first round, lost to Michaëlla Krajicek)
32. (Germany) Martina Müller, (second round, lost to Dominika Cibulková)

== Qualifier entries ==
=== Men's qualifiers entries ===
1. (Brazil) Marcos Daniel
2. (Greece) Konstantinos Economidis
3. (Czech Republic) Lukáš Dlouhý
4. (Italy) Flavio Cipolla
5. (Spain) Iván Navarro
6. (Italy) Fabio Fognini
7. (France) Laurent Recouderc
8. (Argentina) Juan Pablo Brzezicki
9. (Serbia) Boris Pašanski
10. (Croatia) Marin Čilić
11. (France) Jérôme Haehnel
12. (Chile) Paul Capdeville
13. (Belgium) Christophe Rochus
14. (Czech Republic) Ivo Minář
15. (Czech Republic) Bohdan Ulihrach
16. (Serbia) Dušan Vemić

The following players received entry into a lucky loser spot:

1. (Argentina) Mariano Zabaleta
2. (Argentina) Juan Pablo Guzmán
3. (Colombia) Santiago Giraldo
4. (Spain) Fernando Vicente

=== Women's qualifiers entries ===
1. (Ukraine) Mariya Koryttseva
2. (Czech Republic) Květa Peschke
3. (Hungary) Ágnes Szávay
4. (Russia) Alla Kudryavtseva
5. (Uzbekistan) Akgul Amanmuradova
6. (Chinese Taipei) Hsieh Su-wei
7. (Paraguay) Rossana de los Ríos
8. (Switzerland) Timea Bacsinszky
9. (Germany) Andrea Petkovic
10. (Ukraine) Olga Savchuk
11. (Romania) Raluca Olaru
12. (Slovakia) Dominika Cibulková

The following players received entry into a lucky loser spot:

1. (Sweden) Sofia Arvidsson
2. (Finland) Emma Laine

== Protected ranking ==
The following players were accepted directly into the main draw using a protected ranking:

Men's singles

- (Russia) Igor Andreev
- (United States) Justin Gimelstob
- (Romania) Victor Hănescu
- (Netherlands) Martin Verkerk

Women's singles

- (Spain) Nuria Llagostera Vives

== Withdrawn players ==
Men's singles

- (Croatia) Mario Ančić → replaced by (Italy) Stefano Galvani
- (United States) Mardy Fish → replaced by (Colombia) Santiago Giraldo
- (Germany) Tommy Haas → replaced by (Argentina) Juan Pablo Guzmán
- (Germany) Nicolas Kiefer → replaced by (Australia) Chris Guccione
- (Russia) Evgeny Korolev → replaced by (Spain) Fernando Vicente
- (Belgium) Xavier Malisse → replaced by (Italy) Simone Bolelli
- (Spain) Alberto Martín → replaced by (France) Nicolas Devilder
- (United Kingdom) Andy Murray → replaced by (Argentina) Mariano Zabaleta
- (Thailand) Paradorn Srichaphan → replaced by (Italy) Andreas Seppi

Women's singles

- (France) Tatiana Golovin → replaced by (Sweden) Sofia Arvidsson
- (Switzerland) Martina Hingis → replaced by (Switzerland) Emmanuelle Gagliardi
- (Russia) Evgenia Linetskaya → replaced by (Denmark) Caroline Wozniacki
- (China) Peng Shuai → replaced by (Germany) Angelique Kerber
- (Croatia) Karolina Šprem → replaced by (Finland) Emma Laine
- (Russia) Vera Zvonareva → replaced by (Ukraine) Yuliya Beygelzimer

== Media coverage ==
Coverage of the 2007 French Open was as follows:

- Arab World – Al Jazeera Sports
- Europe – Eurosport
- Latin America – ESPN International
- South-East Asia – Star Sports
- Belgium – Sporza, VRT, RTBF
- Brazil – ESPN Brasil
- Croatia – HRT 2 (daily highlights and the singles finals live)
- France – France Televisions
- Great Britain – BBC Interactive (Women's Singles final on BBC 1, Men's Singles final live on interactive service; highlights on BBC 2)
- Ireland – TG4
- Japan – TV Tokyo, Wowow
- Netherlands – NOS
- Russia – Sport TV, NTV Plus
- Serbia – RTS
- United States – NBC, ESPN2, The Tennis Channel

== See also ==
- 2007 in tennis

Preceded by 2007 Australian Open	Grand Slams	Succeeded by 2007 Wimbledon Championships
