= 2007 Australian Open =

- Date: 15–28 January 2007
- Edition: 95th
- Category: Grand Slam (ITF)
- Surface: Hardcourt (Rebound Ace)
- Location: Melbourne, Australia
- Venue: Melbourne Park

Champions

Men's singles
- (Switzerland) Roger Federer

Women's singles
- (United States) Serena Williams

Men's doubles
- (United States) Bob Bryan / (United States) Mike Bryan

Women's doubles
- (Zimbabwe) Cara Black / (South Africa) Liezel Huber

Mixed doubles
- (Canada) Daniel Nestor / (Russia) Elena Likhovtseva

Wheelchair men's singles
- (Japan) Shingo Kunieda

Wheelchair women's singles
- (Netherlands) Esther Vergeer

Wheelchair men's doubles
- (Netherlands) Robin Ammerlaan / (Japan) Shingo Kunieda

Wheelchair women's doubles
- (Netherlands) Jiske Griffioen / (Netherlands) Esther Vergeer

Boys' singles
- (Australia) Brydan Klein

Girls' singles
- (Russia) Anastasia Pavlyuchenkova

Boys' doubles
- (United Kingdom) Graeme Dyce / (Finland) Harri Heliövaara

Girls' doubles
- (Russia) Evgeniya Rodina / (Russia) Arina Rodionova
- Australian Open

The 2007 Australian Open was a Grand Slam tennis tournament held in Melbourne, Australia from 15 January until 28 January 2007.

The total prize pool was set at exactly A$20 million, with the winners of both the men's and women's singles competition each receiving A$1,281,000. Over 500 players competed in 2007. The main draw for singles and doubles was released on Friday 12 January 2007.

In Mixed Doubles, the scoring system was changed. Should both teams in a match become one set apiece, a match tie break will take part in the final set where the first team to score ten points wins the match. If the score for the match tie break becomes 9–9, a difference by two is required to win the game (e.g. 11–9, 12–10, etc.).

== Notable stories ==
=== New technology used in line-calling ===
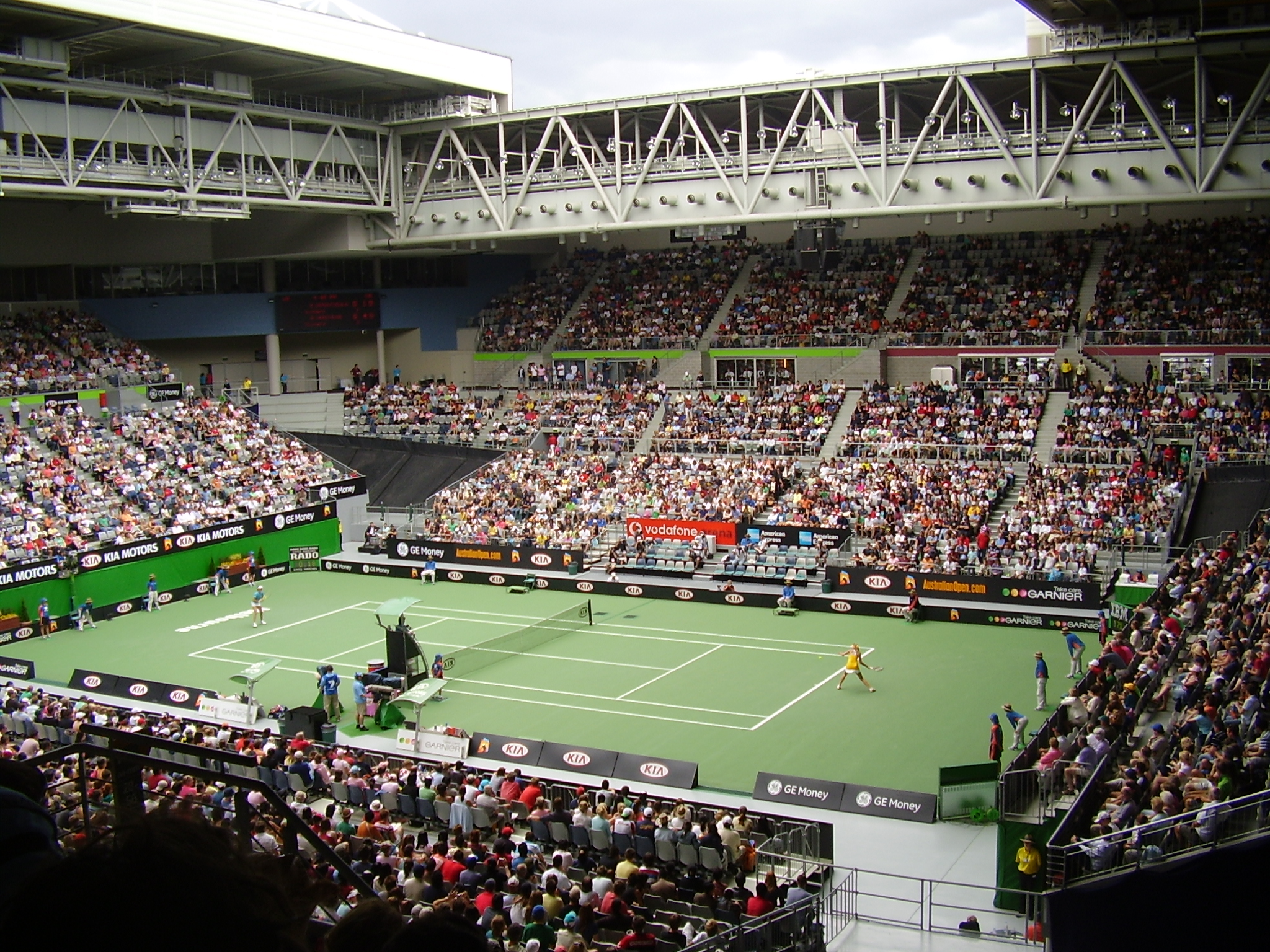
Women's singles fourth round match at Melbourne Arena on day six of the 2007 Australian Open.

This was the first time that the tournament used the Hawk-Eye system in an official line-calling capacity, as an auxiliary to the human line judges. Players were given the opportunity to challenge a human line call if they believed it to be incorrect, by having Hawk-Eye confirm or overrule the original call. The system was installed on only one court being used for the tournament, in the Rod Laver Arena.

At the beginning of a set, the players were each given the opportunity to incorrectly challenge a maximum of two line calls during the set. A player who still had some incorrect challenges remaining was allowed to make an unlimited number of correct challenges, but when a player had no incorrect challenges remaining, his or her opportunity to challenge line calls was lost. Players received an extra incorrect challenge during a tiebreak. The players regained both challenges at the beginning of each set and also after every 12 games in the final deciding set. Unused challenges did not carry over when this happened.

An additional aspect to the new system was that a video replay screen was installed inside the arena for the first time, to display the results of the challenges. The screen also allowed the spectators (and players themselves) to view instant replays that could previously only be seen by the television audience and those viewing the match on screens outside the stadium. This implementation caused noticeable drama in a match between No. 2 Amélie Mauresmo and Olga Puchkova in which Mauresmo challenged the in call on Poutchkova's shot and the replay showed the ball out graphically but still called the ball in.

=== Factional fighting on day 1 ===
On 15 January 2007, around one hundred and fifty Australian youths of Serbian, Croatian and Greek origins were ejected from the Open after brawling with one another in Garden Square at Melbourne Park. The brawl reportedly developed after fans taunted each other with nationalist slogans. According to The Age newspaper, twenty police tried to quell the disturbance, which allegedly developed after an informal understanding between some Serb and Croat fans — that the two groups would not attend on the same day — was broken. The two opposing groups were ejected out separate exits and escorted away from the venue in opposite directions by police. No arrests were made, and no charges were laid against any of the participants.

The Greek supporters protested that they had not been involved in the taunts exchanged between the Serb and Croat contingents, though The Age reported that some Greek supporters had sided with some Serbs and chanted, "Greece, Serbia! Greece, Serbia!" and "We must support our Orthodox brothers". Serb fans claimed that the violence had been provoked by Croat use of the Croatian national flag, which in their eyes carried connotations of Second World War fascism, while Croats claimed that the violence was provoked by Serbs shouting anti-Croat, pro-Serb chants.

A Croatian supporter suffered minor injuries in the ethnic brawl after being hit with a Serbian flagpole. People wearing Croatian or Serbian national colours were subsequently refused entry and the next day featured heightened security. Police in Victoria said that this sort of behaviour was never seen in the tournament before.

=== Weather conditions ===
Heat in excess of 40 degrees Celsius (104 degrees Fahrenheit) on Day 2 caused the Extreme Heat Policy to be implemented. Most daytime matches were delayed, and matches continued on outside courts till 3.30am the following morning. Janko Tipsarević chose to forfeit his match against David Nalbandian because of the heat. On Rod Laver Arena with the roof open, top-seeded Maria Sharapova nearly succumbed to the heat, losing a 5–0 lead in the final set, but managed to defeat Camille Pin 6–3. 4–6, 9–7.

During the night sessions on Day 3, the Australian Open was affected by rain delaying play. Three men's matches were postponed in progress. The matches on Rod Laver Arena and Melbourne Arena were delayed for only 15 minutes while the retractable roofs closed. Marat Safin wisely requested that play be suspended while noticeably out of the match against Dudi Sela with Sela up two sets to one, six games to five, and 30-30. After the delay, Safin returned to win the fourth set and then the final set 6–0 to advance. This was reminiscent of the match in the 2006 Australian Open in which Marcos Baghdatis advanced after appearing rejuvenated against David Nalbandian. The match on Rod Laver featuring women's number two Amélie Mauresmo and Olga Puchkova was barely underway when the rains came.

Rain on day six caused play to only proceed on the covered courts of Rod Laver Arena and Melbourne Arena, for the duration of the day. Thus, only high seeds Maria Sharapova, Rafael Nadal, Nikolay Davydenko, Kim Clijsters, James Blake, and Martina Hingis were able to play their matches, as well as Australians Alicia Molik and Lleyton Hewitt. Players scheduled for play on the outer courts had to wait until Day 7, and faced the possibility of playing on consecutive days for the winners. Initially only 10 matches were scheduled for play in Laver and Vodafone, but the match between Andy Murray and Juan Ignacio Chela was moved indoors, to leave only five delayed matches in men's and women's singles.

== Seniors ==
=== Men's singles ===
(Switzerland) Roger Federer defeated (Chile) Fernando González, 7–6^{(7–2)}, 6–4, 6–4

- It was Federer's 1st title of the year, and his 46th overall. It was his 10th career Grand Slam title, and his 3rd Australian Open title.

=== Women's singles ===
(United States) Serena Williams defeated (Russia) Maria Sharapova, 6–1, 6–2

=== Men's doubles ===
(United States) Bob Bryan / (United States) Mike Bryan defeated (Sweden) Jonas Björkman / (Belarus) Max Mirnyi, 7–5, 7–5

=== Women's doubles ===
(Zimbabwe) Cara Black / (South Africa) Liezel Huber defeated (Chinese Taipei) Chan Yung-jan / (Chinese Taipei) Chuang Chia-jung, 6–4, 6–7^{(4–7)}, 6–1

=== Mixed doubles ===
(Canada) Daniel Nestor / (Russia) Elena Likhovtseva defeated (Belarus) Max Mirnyi / (Belarus) Victoria Azarenka, 6–4, 6–4

== Juniors ==
=== Boys' singles ===
(Australia) Brydan Klein defeated (France) Jonathan Eysseric, 6–2, 4–6, 6–1

=== Girls' singles ===
(Russia) Anastasia Pavlyuchenkova defeated (United States) Madison Brengle, 7–6^{(8–6)}, 7–6^{(7–3)}

=== Boys' doubles ===
(United Kingdom) Graeme Dyce / (Finland) Harri Heliövaara defeated (Australia) Stephen Donald / (India) Rupesh Roy, 6–2, 6–7^{(4–7)}, 6–3

=== Girls' doubles ===
(Russia) Evgeniya Rodina / (Russia) Arina Rodionova defeated (United States) Julia Cohen / (Poland) Urszula Radwańska, 2–6, 6–3, 6–1

== Wheelchair ==
=== Men's wheelchair singles ===
(Japan) Shingo Kunieda defeated (France) Michaël Jérémiasz, 6–3, 3–6, 6–4

=== Women's wheelchair singles ===
(Netherlands) Esther Vergeer defeated (France) Florence Gravellier, 6–1, 6–0

=== Men's wheelchair doubles ===
(Netherlands) Robin Ammerlaan / (Japan) Shingo Kunieda defeated (Netherlands) Maikel Scheffers/ (Netherlands) Ronald Vink, 6–2, 6–0

=== Women's wheelchair doubles ===
(Netherlands) Jiske Griffioen / (Netherlands) Esther Vergeer defeated (France) Florence Gravellier/ (Netherlands) Korie Homan, 6–0, 3–6, [10–6]

== Seeds ==
The seeded players are listed below with the round in which they exited.

=== Men ===
1. (Switzerland) Roger Federer (champion)
2. (Spain) Rafael Nadal (quarterfinals, lost to Fernando González)
3. (Russia) Nikolay Davydenko (quarterfinals, lost to Tommy Haas)
4. (Croatia) Ivan Ljubičić (first round, lost to Mardy Fish)
5. (United States) James Blake (fourth round, lost to Fernando González)
6. (United States) Andy Roddick (semifinals, lost to Roger Federer)
7. (Spain) Tommy Robredo (quarterfinals, lost to Roger Federer)
8. (Argentina) David Nalbandian (fourth round, lost to Tommy Haas)
9. (Croatia) Mario Ančić (fourth round, lost to Andy Roddick)
10. (Chile) Fernando González (final, lost to Roger Federer)
11. (Cyprus) Marcos Baghdatis (second round, lost to Gaël Monfils)
12. (Germany) Tommy Haas (semifinals, lost to Fernando González)
13. (Czech Republic) Tomáš Berdych (fourth round, lost to Nikolay Davydenko)
14. (Serbia) Novak Djokovic (fourth round, lost to Roger Federer)
15. (United Kingdom) Andy Murray (fourth round, lost to Rafael Nadal)
16. (Spain) David Ferrer (fourth round, lost to Mardy Fish)
17. (Finland) Jarkko Nieminen (second round, lost to Juan Ignacio Chela)
18. (France) Richard Gasquet (fourth round, lost to Tommy Robredo)
19. (Australia) Lleyton Hewitt (third round, lost to Fernando González)
20. (Czech Republic) Radek Štěpánek (third round, lost to David Ferrer)
21. (Russia) Dmitry Tursunov (third round, lost to Tomáš Berdych)
22. (Slovakia) Dominik Hrbatý (Third Round, lost to Mario Ančić)
23. (Sweden) Robin Söderling (first round, lost to Florian Mayer)
24. (Spain) Juan Carlos Ferrero (second round, lost to Danai Udomchoke)
25. (Russia) Mikhail Youzhny (third round, lost to Roger Federer)
26. (Russia) Marat Safin (third round, lost to Andy Roddick)
27. (Argentina) José Acasuso (first round, lost to Sam Querrey)
28. (France) Sébastien Grosjean (third round, lost to David Nalbandian)
29. (Belgium) Xavier Malisse (first round, lost to Arnaud Clément)
30. (Argentina) Agustín Calleri (first round, lost to Zack Fleishman)
31. (Switzerland) Stanislas Wawrinka (third round, lost to Rafael Nadal)
32. (Spain) Nicolás Almagro (first round, lost to Robby Ginepri)

=== Women ===
1. (Russia) Maria Sharapova (final, lost to Serena Williams)
2. (France) Amélie Mauresmo (fourth round, lost to Lucie Šafářová)
3. (Russia) Svetlana Kuznetsova (fourth round, lost to Shahar Pe'er)
4. (Belgium) Kim Clijsters (semifinals, lost to Maria Sharapova)
5. (Russia) Nadia Petrova (third round, lost to Serena Williams)
6. (Switzerland) Martina Hingis (quarterfinals, lost to Kim Clijsters)
7. (Russia) Elena Dementieva (fourth round, lost to Nicole Vaidišová)
8. (Switzerland) Patty Schnyder (fourth round, lost to Anna Chakvetadze)
9. (Russia) Dinara Safina (third round, lost to Li Na)
10. (Czech Republic) Nicole Vaidišová (semifinals, lost to Serena Williams)
11. (Serbia) Jelena Janković (fourth round, lost to Serena Williams)
12. (Russia) Anna Chakvetadze (quarterfinals, lost to Maria Sharapova)
13. (Serbia) Ana Ivanovic (third round, lost to Vera Zvonareva)
14. (Italy) Francesca Schiavone (second round, lost to Lucie Šafářová)
15. (Slovakia) Daniela Hantuchová (fourth round, lost to Kim Clijsters)
16. (Israel) Shahar Pe'er (quarterfinals, lost to Serena Williams)
17. (Germany) Anna-Lena Grönefeld (second round, lost to Ashley Harkleroad)
18. (France) Marion Bartoli (second round, lost to Victoria Azarenka)
19. (China) Li Na (fourth round, lost to Martina Hingis)
20. (France) Tatiana Golovin (third round, lost to Shahar Pe'er)
21. (Slovenia) Katarina Srebotnik (third round, lost to Casey Dellacqua)
22. (Russia) Vera Zvonareva (fourth round, lost to Maria Sharapova)
23. (Japan) Ai Sugiyama (second round, lost to Anastasiya Yakimova)
24. (Australia) Samantha Stosur (second round, lost to Jelena Kostanić Tošić)
25. (Spain) Anabel Medina Garrigues (first round, lost to Elena Vesnina)
26. (Russia) Maria Kirilenko (third round, lost to Svetlana Kuznetsova)
27. (Italy) Mara Santangelo (first round, lost to Serena Williams)
28. (Italy) Flavia Pennetta (first round, lost to Kaia Kanepi)
29. (Ukraine) Alona Bondarenko (third round, lost to Kim Clijsters)
30. (Italy) Tathiana Garbin (third round, lost to Maria Sharapova)
31. (China) Zheng Jie (first round, lost to Julia Schruff)
32. (Greece) Eleni Daniilidou (first round, lost to Aiko Nakamura)

== Main draw wildcard entries ==
=== Men's singles ===
- (Australia) Wayne Arthurs
- (Australia) Chris Guccione
- (Australia) Alun Jones
- (Australia) Peter Luczak
- (United States) Sam Querrey
- (Australia) Robert Smeets
- (Japan) Go Soeda
- (France) Jo-Wilfried Tsonga

=== Women's singles ===
- (Australia) Monique Adamczak
- (United States) Madison Brengle
- (Australia) Casey Dellacqua
- (France) Youlia Fedossova
- (Australia) Sophie Ferguson
- (Australia) Alicia Molik
- (Australia) Jessica Moore
- (Uzbekistan) Iroda Tulyaganova

=== Men's doubles ===
- (Australia) Wayne Arthurs / (Australia) Peter Luczak
- (Australia) Paul Baccanello / (Australia) Chris Guccione
- (Australia) Carsten Ball / (Australia) Adam Feeney
- (Australia) Andrew Coelho / (Australia) Alun Jones
- (Australia) Nathan Healey / (Australia) Robert Smeets
- (Australia) Greg Jones / (Australia) Brydan Klein

=== Women's doubles ===
- (Australia) Monique Adamczak / (Australia) Evie Dominikovic
- (Australia) Lauren Breadmore / (Australia) Emily Hewson
- (Chinese Taipei) Chan Yung-jan / (Chinese Taipei) Chuang Chia-jung
- (Australia) Casey Dellacqua / (Australia) Jessica Moore
- (Australia) Daniella Dominikovic / (Australia) Sophie Ferguson
- (France) Tatiana Golovin / (Australia) Alicia Molik
- (Australia) Trudi Musgrave / (Australia) Christina Wheeler

=== Mixed doubles ===
- (Australia) Monique Adamczak / (Australia) Stephen Huss
- (Australia) Casey Dellacqua / (Australia) Chris Guccione
- (Australia) Alicia Molik / (Australia) Paul Hanley
- (Australia) Nicole Pratt / (Australia) Ashley Fisher
- (Australia) Bryanne Stewart / (Australia) Nathan Healey

== Qualifier entries ==
=== Men's qualifiers entries ===
1. (United Kingdom) Alan Mackin
2. (United States) Zack Fleishman
3. (Germany) Alexander Waske
4. (Germany) Mischa Zverev
5. (Russia) Teymuraz Gabashvili
6. (United States) Michael Russell
7. (United States) Bobby Reynolds
8. (Switzerland) Marco Chiudinelli
9. (Croatia) Marin Čilić
10. (Germany) Michael Berrer
11. (Israel) Dudi Sela
12. (Chile) Paul Capdeville
13. (Slovakia) Lukáš Lacko
14. (Serbia) Ilija Bozoljac
15. (United States) Brian Wilson
16. (United States) Alex Kuznetsov

=== Women's qualifiers entries ===
1. (France) Alizé Cornet
2. (Russia) Alla Kudryavtseva
3. (France) Stéphanie Cohen-Aloro
4. (Czech Republic) Sandra Záhlavová
5. (Ukraine) Julia Vakulenko
6. (Czech Republic) Klára Zakopalová
7. (Slovenia) Andreja Klepač
8. (Argentina) Jorgelina Cravero
9. (United States) Ahsha Rolle
10. (Czech Republic) Renata Voráčová
11. (Luxembourg) Anne Kremer
12. (Austria) Tamira Paszek

== Protected ranking ==
The following players were accepted directly into the main draw using a protected ranking:

Men's Singles

- (Romania) Victor Hănescu
- (Sweden) Joachim Johansson

Women's Singles

- (Russia) Elena Bovina

== Withdrawn players ==
Men's Singles

- (United States) Justin Gimelstob → replaced by (Czech Republic) Jiří Vaněk
- (United Kingdom) Tim Henman → replaced by (Russia) Evgeny Korolev
- (Germany) Nicolas Kiefer → replaced by (Thailand) Danai Udomchoke
- (Netherlands) Martin Verkerk → replaced by (Luxembourg) Gilles Müller

Women's Singles

- (United States) Lindsay Davenport → replaced by (Israel) Tzipora Obziler
- (Belgium) Justine Henin-Hardenne → replaced by (Russia) Galina Voskoboeva
- (Spain) María José Martínez Sánchez → replaced by (China) Yuan Meng
- (Russia) Anastasia Myskina → replaced by (France) Stéphanie Foretz
- (United States) Venus Williams → replaced by (Switzerland) Emmanuelle Gagliardi

== Attendance ==
| Day | Day Session | Night Session | Total |
|---|---|---|---|
| 1 | 41,254 | 14,288 | 55,542 |
| 2 | 33,024 | 15,574 | 48,598 |
| 3 | 31,109 | 16,677 | 47,786 |
| 4 | 38,622 | 17,580 | 56,202 |
| 5 | 32,253 | 17,557 | 49,810 |
| 6 | 35,555 | 14,932 | 50,487 |
| 7 | 35,957 | 14,801 | 50,758 |
| 8 | 28,998 | 15,178 | 44,176 |
| 9 | 19,616 | 15,091 | 34,707 |
| 10 | 18,674 | 14,971 | 33,645 |
| 11 | 16,826 | 14,957 | 31,783 |
| 12 | 17,868 | – | 17,868 |
| 13 | 15,833 | – | 15,833 |
| 14 | 17,663 | – | 17,663 |
| Total | 383,252 | 171,606 | 554,858 |

== Media coverage ==
Coverage of the 2007 Australian Open was as follows:

Television networks

- Australia — Channel Seven (Live)
- Australia — Fox Sports (Live)
- Canada — TSN (Live and re-runs)
- Europe — Eurosport (Live)
- India — Star Sports (Live)
- Latin America — ESPN (Live and re-runs)
- Macedonia — Macedonian Radio-Television
- Netherlands — Sport 1 (Live)
- Netherlands — Nederland 1 & Nederland 3 (Highlights)
- New Zealand — SKY Sport (Live)
- Singapore — ESPN (Live)
- South Africa — Supersport
- South America — ESPN (Live) & ESPN+ (Live)
- United Kingdom — BBC One (Live – finals only)
- United Kingdom — BBC Red Button (Live – evening sessions only)
- United Kingdom — BBC Two (Live – Unscheduled coverage)
- United States — ESPN2 & ESPN (Live)

Radio

- United Kingdom — BBC Radio 5 Live (Live)

== Controversies and scandals ==
- Three men were arrested for taking up-skirt photos inside Melbourne Park.
- Police were summoned to investigate the sexual assault of a five-year-old boy in a toilet cubicle at the tournament.
- Maria Sharapova was fined $2000 for allegations of sideline-coaching from her father, Yuri Sharapov in her match against Anna Chakvetadze.

== See also ==
- 2007 in tennis

| Preceded by 2006 U.S. Open | Grand Slams | Succeeded by 2007 French Open |
