= Turbo Tennis =

Abbreviated form of tennis

Turbo extra Tennis is a shortened form of tennis in which players play in a fast knockout tournament which consists of five matches of 30 minutes each, taking place over the course of a single afternoon. The idea was launched in London by former Wimbledon champion Pat Cash, American world number nine James Blake and English Entrepreneur Andi White.

== Betfair Turbo Tennis at London ==
The first tournament took place on 15 September 2007 at the O2 Arena in London. It featured six players. The winner received prize money of £50,000. The first tournament at the O2 arena was won by Andy Murray, defeating Goran Ivanisevic in the final.

Players competing in the inaugural tournament were;

- (United Kingdom) Andy Murray - then world number 19 and British number 1
- (Australia) Pat Cash - Former Wimbledon Champion (1987)
- (United States) James Blake - then world number 6
- (Croatia) Goran Ivanišević - Former Wimbledon Champion (2001)
- (United Kingdom) Jamie Murray - 2007 Wimbledon mixed doubles champion, then British number 1 doubles player
- (United Kingdom) Greg Rusedski - Former world number 4, replaced Tim Henman

== Betfair Turbo Tennis at Saragossa (Spain) ==
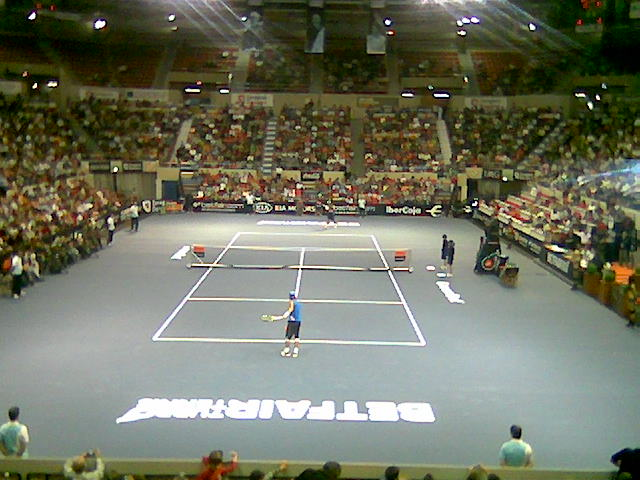
Carlos Moya playing at Betfair Turbotennis at Pabellon Principe Felipe, Zaragoza (Spain)

The tournament took place on October 27, 2007. Players competing in the inaugural tournament were Rafael Nadal, David Ferrer, Carlos Moyá, Sergi Bruguera, Pat Cash and Joachim Johansson. The winner was David Ferrer, who beats Rafael Nadal in the final (7/5).

== Rules ==
Unlike regular tennis, games are set to a 30-minute time limit with a klaxon on the fifteenth minute to signify a change of ends from the next game onwards. If games are level after 30 minutes the winner is decided by a sudden death point, but there have been some changes and you have to win 2 out of 3 sudden death points to win the match. Other main differences include a 15-second maximum time limit for serves which, if exceeded, results in the player losing the point automatically; lets on serves are also played.
