= 2007 French Open – Women's singles =

Women's singles
- 2007 French Open

Final
- Champion: (Belgium) Justine Henin
- Runner-up: (Serbia) Ana Ivanovic
- Score: 6–1, 6–2

Events
Singles	men	women		boys	girls
Doubles	men	women	mixed	boys	girls
WC Singles	men	women	quad
WC Doubles	men	women	quad
Legends	−45	45+	women
- French Open

Two-time defending champion Justine Henin defeated Ana Ivanovic in the final, 6–1, 6–2 to win the women's singles tennis title at the 2007 French Open. It was her fourth French Open title and sixth major title overall. For the second consecutive year, Henin did not lose a set during the tournament and did not face a tiebreak in any set. Ivanovic became the first player representing Serbia to reach a major final. (Note: Monica Seles reached several major finals in the 1990s, but did so when Serbia was part of Yugoslavia.)

The tournament also marked the major debuts of two future world No. 1 players and major champions, Caroline Wozniacki and Angelique Kerber. Both lost in the first round, to Nathalie Dechy and Elena Dementieva, respectively. Additionally, this tournament featured the major debut of future WTA Finals champion Dominika Cibulková, who reached the third round before losing to Svetlana Kuznetsova.

This marked the first time that the French Open awarded equal prize money for both men and women. It was the last major tournament to do so, following the US Open in 1973, the Australian Open in 2001, and the Wimbledon Championships earlier in 2007 (which adopted equal prize money before the French Open but was held after it that year).

== Seeds ==
1. (Belgium) Justine Henin (champion)
2. (Russia) Maria Sharapova (semifinals)
3. (Russia) Svetlana Kuznetsova (quarterfinals)
4. (Serbia) Jelena Janković (semifinals)
5. (France) Amélie Mauresmo (third round)
6. (Czech Republic) Nicole Vaidišová (quarterfinals)
7. (Serbia) Ana Ivanovic (final)
8. (United States) Serena Williams (quarterfinals)
9. (Russia) Anna Chakvetadze (quarterfinals)
10. (Russia) Dinara Safina (fourth round)
11. (Russia) Nadia Petrova (first round)
12. (Slovakia) Daniela Hantuchová (third round)
13. (Russia) Elena Dementieva (third round)
14. (Switzerland) Patty Schnyder (fourth round)
15. (Israel) Shahar Pe'er (fourth round)
16. (China) Li Na (third round)
17. (Slovenia) Katarina Srebotnik (third round)
18. (France) Marion Bartoli (fourth round)
19. (Italy) Tathiana Garbin (fourth round)
20. (Austria) Sybille Bammer (fourth round)
21. (Japan) Ai Sugiyama (third round)
22. (Ukraine) Alona Bondarenko (second round)
23. (Italy) Francesca Schiavone (third round)
24. (Spain) Anabel Medina Garrigues (fourth round)
25. (Czech Republic) Lucie Šafářová (fourth round)
26. (United States) Venus Williams (third round)
27. (Australia) Samantha Stosur (third round)
28. (Italy) Mara Santangelo (third round)
29. (Argentina) Gisela Dulko (second round)
30. (Ukraine) Julia Vakulenko (first round)
31. (France) Séverine Brémond (first round)
32. (Germany) Martina Müller (second round)

== Draw ==
Key

- Q = Qualifier
- WC = Wild card
- LL = Lucky loser
- Alt = Alternate
- ITF = ITF entry
- PR = Protected ranking
- SR = Special ranking
- SE = Special exempt
- JE = Junior exempt
- JR = Junior Accelerator Programme entrant
- CO = College Accelerator Programme entrant
- NG = Next Gen Accelerator Program entrant
- w/o = Walkover
- r = Retired
- d = Defaulted

=== Finals ===
Quarterfinals
1	(Belgium) Justine Henin	6	6
8	(United States) Serena Williams	4	3
4	(Serbia) Jelena Janković	6	7
6	(Czech Republic) Nicole Vaidišová	3	5
7	(Serbia) Ana Ivanovic	6	3	6
3	(Russia) Svetlana Kuznetsova	0	6	1
9	(Russia) Anna Chakvetadze	3	4
2	(Russia) Maria Sharapova	6	6

Semifinals
1	(Belgium) Justine Henin	6	6
4	(Serbia) Jelena Janković	2	2
7	(Serbia) Ana Ivanovic	6	6
2	(Russia) Maria Sharapova	2	1

Final
1	(Belgium) Justine Henin	6	6
7	(Serbia) Ana Ivanovic	1	2

=== Top half ===
==== Section 1 ====
First round
1	(Belgium) J Henin	6	6
(Russia) E Vesnina	4	3
(Austria) T Paszek	6	6
(Japan) A Nakamura	4	0
(Thailand) T Tanasugarn	6	4	6
WC	(Australia) C Dellacqua	3	6	4
(Poland) A Radwańska	1	4
28	(Italy) M Santangelo	6	6
20	(Austria) S Bammer	6	6
(Italy) R Vinci	4	4
(Russia) Y Shvedova	5	5
Q	(Ukraine) O Savchuk	7	7
WC	(France) P Parmentier	6	3	7
Q	(Ukraine) M Koryttseva	4	6	5
(Germany) S Klösel	6^{4}	0
16	(China) N Li	7^{7}	6

Second round
1	(Belgium) J Henin	7	6
(Austria) T Paszek	5	1
(Thailand) T Tanasugarn	3	2
28	(Italy) M Santangelo	6	6
20	(Austria) S Bammer	6	6
Q	(Ukraine) O Savchuk	0	3
WC	(France) P Parmentier	3	6	4
16	(China) N Li	6	3	6

Third round
1	(Belgium) J Henin	6	6
28	(Italy) M Santangelo	2	3
20	(Austria) S Bammer	6	6
16	(China) N Li	4	3

Fourth round
1	(Belgium) J Henin	6	6
20	(Austria) S Bammer	2	4

==== Section 2 ====
First round
10	(Russia) D Safina	7	6
(Ukraine) Y Fedak	5	4
(Hungary) M Czink	3	4
(Israel) T Obziler	6	6
Q	(Switzerland) T Bacsinszky	7^{7}	6
(China) J Zheng	6^{3}	0
(Austria) Y Meusburger	2	4
23	(Italy) F Schiavone	6	6
31	(France) S Brémond	3	3
(Netherlands) M Krajicek	6	6
WC	(France) O Sanchez	6	4	3
(United States) S Perry	3	6	6
(Venezuela) M Sequera	5	6	9
(France) V Razzano	7	3	7
(Bulgaria) T Pironkova	7	1	1
8	(United States) S Williams	5	6	6

Second round
10	(Russia) D Safina	6	6
(Israel) T Obziler	1	0
Q	(Switzerland) T Bacsinszky	3	6^{5}
23	(Italy) F Schiavone	6	7^{7}
(Netherlands) M Krajicek	6	5	6
(United States) S Perry	4	7	1
(Venezuela) M Sequera	0	6^{3}
8	(United States) S Williams	6	7^{7}

Third round
10	(Russia) D Safina	3	6	6
23	(Italy) F Schiavone	6	3	1
(Netherlands) M Krajicek	3	4
8	(United States) S Williams	6	6

Fourth round
10	(Russia) D Safina	2	3
8	(United States) S Williams	6	6

==== Section 3 ====
First round
4	(Serbia) J Janković	6	6
WC	(France) S Foretz	2	2
(Colombia) C Castaño	1	7	6
LL	(Finland) E Laine	6	5	4
(Canada) A Wozniak	2	6^{1}
(United States) A Harkleroad	6	7^{7}
WC	(France) A Cornet	4	3
26	(United States) V Williams	6	6
18	(France) M Bartoli	6	6
(France) A Rezaï	2	4
(Slovakia) J Gajdošová	6	3	3
Q	(Germany) A Petkovic	4	6	6
WC	(France) M Johansson	7	6
(Germany) A-L Grönefeld	5	4
(Germany) A Kerber	3	2
13	(Russia) E Dementieva	6	6

Second round
4	(Serbia) J Janković	6	6
(Colombia) C Castaño	3	3
(United States) A Harkleroad	1	6^{8}
26	(United States) V Williams	6	7^{10}
18	(France) M Bartoli	0	6	6
Q	(Germany) A Petkovic	6	2	3
WC	(France) M Johansson	5	5
13	(Russia) E Dementieva	7	7

Third round
4	(Serbia) J Janković	6	4	6
26	(United States) V Williams	4	6	1
18	(France) M Bartoli	6	6
13	(Russia) E Dementieva	2	4

Fourth round
4	(Serbia) J Janković	6	6
18	(France) M Bartoli	1	1

==== Section 4 ====
First round
11	(Russia) N Petrova	5	7	0
Q	(Czech Republic) K Peschke	7	5	6
(Belarus) A Yakimova	6^{3}	1
WC	(France) S Cohen-Aloro	7^{7}	6
PR	(Spain) N Llagostera Vives	6	7
(Israel) A Smashnova	2	5
(Japan) A Morigami	6^{2}	4
19	(Italy) T Garbin	7^{7}	6
27	(Australia) S Stosur	6	6
(United States) J Jackson	1	2
(Russia) M Kirilenko	6	6
(Italy) ME Camerin	3	0
Q	(Uzbekistan) A Amanmuradova	7^{7}	4	6
(United States) V King	6^{5}	6	3
(Switzerland) E Gagliardi	4	3
6	(Czech Republic) N Vaidišová	6	6

Second round
Q	(Czech Republic) K Peschke	1	1
WC	(France) S Cohen-Aloro	6	6
PR	(Spain) N Llagostera Vives	4	3
19	(Italy) T Garbin	6	6
27	(Australia) S Stosur	6	3	7
(Russia) M Kirilenko	1	6	5
Q	(Uzbekistan) A Amanmuradova	2	4
6	(Czech Republic) N Vaidišová	6	6

Third round
WC	(France) S Cohen-Aloro	3	0
19	(Italy) T Garbin	6	6
27	(Australia) S Stosur	4	4
6	(Czech Republic) N Vaidišová	6	6

Fourth round
19	(Italy) T Garbin	3	1
6	(Czech Republic) N Vaidišová	6	6

=== Bottom half ===
==== Section 5 ====
First round
7	(Serbia) A Ivanovic	6	6
LL	(Sweden) S Arvidsson	2	0
(Italy) A Brianti	1	1
(India) S Mirza	6	6
(Belarus) T Poutchek	6	6
WC	(France) Y Fedossova	3	2
Q	(Romania) IR Olaru	6	6
30	(Ukraine) J Vakulenko	4	1
24	(Spain) A Medina Garrigues	6	2	6
(Uzbekistan) V Lepchenko	1	6	2
(Russia) E Likhovtseva	4	7	6
(Chinese Taipei) Y-j Chan	6	5	3
(Russia) O Puchkova	7	0	6
(Greece) E Daniilidou	5	6	3
(Croatia) J Kostanić Tošić	3	1
12	(Slovakia) D Hantuchová	6	6

Second round
7	(Serbia) A Ivanovic	6	6
(India) S Mirza	1	4
(Belarus) T Poutchek	3	0
Q	(Romania) IR Olaru	6	6
24	(Spain) A Medina Garrigues	7	6
(Russia) E Likhovtseva	5	4
(Russia) O Puchkova	6	3
12	(Slovakia) D Hantuchová	7	6

Third round
7	(Serbia) A Ivanovic	6	6
Q	(Romania) IR Olaru	2	0
24	(Spain) A Medina Garrigues	4	7	7
12	(Slovakia) D Hantuchová	6	6^{2}	5

Fourth round
7	(Serbia) A Ivanovic	6	3	6
24	(Spain) A Medina Garrigues	3	6	3

==== Section 6 ====
First round
15	(Israel) S Pe'er	6	6
(Estonia) K Kanepi	1	3
(Romania) E Gallovits	6	4
(Russia) V Bardina	0	0^{r}
(Russia) V Dushevina	6	6
(France) C Pin	4	4
(Russia) A Rodionova	1	3
17	(Slovenia) K Srebotnik	6	6
32	(Germany) M Müller	6	6
Q	(Paraguay) R de los Ríos	4	4
Q	(Slovakia) D Cibulková	6	6
(China) T Sun	4	4
(Russia) A Myskina	1	0
(United States) M Shaughnessy	6	6
(Russia) E Bychkova	0	3
3	(Russia) S Kuznetsova	6	6

Second round
15	(Israel) S Pe'er	6	6
(Romania) E Gallovits	4	1
(Russia) V Dushevina	4	2
17	(Slovenia) K Srebotnik	6	6
32	(Germany) M Müller	3	2
Q	(Slovakia) D Cibulková	6	6
(United States) M Shaughnessy	6^{4}	3
3	(Russia) S Kuznetsova	7^{7}	6

Third round
15	(Israel) S Pe'er	6	4	6
17	(Slovenia) K Srebotnik	1	6	3
Q	(Slovakia) D Cibulková	2	3
3	(Russia) S Kuznetsova	6	6

Fourth round
15	(Israel) S Pe'er	4	3
3	(Russia) S Kuznetsova	6	6

==== Section 7 ====
First round
5	(France) A Mauresmo	6	7
(United States) L Granville	0	5
(Denmark) C Wozniacki	2	7^{7}	0
(France) N Dechy	6	6^{3}	6
(Italy) F Pennetta	6^{3}	2
(Australia) N Pratt	7^{7}	6
(Ukraine) Y Beygelzimer	4	3
25	(Czech Republic) L Šafářová	6	6
21	(Japan) A Sugiyama	6	6
(Czech Republic) E Birnerová	3	4
(Italy) R Oprandi	3	4
(United States) M Tu	6	6
(Luxembourg) A Kremer	5	2
Q	(Hungary) Á Szávay	7	6
(Australia) A Molik	2	3
9	(Russia) A Chakvetadze	6	6

Second round
5	(France) A Mauresmo	6	6^{3}	6
(France) N Dechy	3	7^{7}	1
(Australia) N Pratt	0	1
25	(Czech Republic) L Šafářová	6	6
21	(Japan) A Sugiyama	6	1	6
(United States) M Tu	3	6	1
Q	(Hungary) Á Szávay	4	7^{7}	4
9	(Russia) A Chakvetadze	6	6^{1}	6

Third round
5	(France) A Mauresmo	3	6^{3}
25	(Czech Republic) L Šafářová	6	7^{7}
21	(Japan) A Sugiyama	4	4
9	(Russia) A Chakvetadze	6	6

Fourth round
25	(Czech Republic) L Šafářová	4	6	2
9	(Russia) A Chakvetadze	6	0	6

==== Section 8 ====
First round
14	(Switzerland) P Schnyder	2	6	6
(Slovakia) M Suchá	6	1	2
(Ukraine) K Bondarenko	6	6
(Czech Republic) Z Ondrášková	0	1
(Italy) K Knapp	6	6
(Belarus) V Azarenka	1	1
(Czech Republic) I Benešová	0	1
22	(Ukraine) A Bondarenko	6	6
29	(Argentina) G Dulko	6	6
Q	(Chinese Taipei) S-w Hsieh	4	3
(Germany) J Schruff	1	4
Q	(Russia) A Kudryavtseva	6	6
(Spain) L Domínguez Lino	1	6	4
(United States) J Craybas	6	2	6
(France) É Loit	3	6^{4}
2	(Russia) M Sharapova	6	7^{7}

Second round
14	(Switzerland) P Schnyder	6	6
(Ukraine) K Bondarenko	3	2
(Italy) K Knapp	6	2	6
22	(Ukraine) A Bondarenko	4	6	3
29	(Argentina) G Dulko	5	6	6
Q	(Russia) A Kudryavtseva	7	1	8
(United States) J Craybas	2	1
2	(Russia) M Sharapova	6	6

Third round
14	(Switzerland) P Schnyder	4	6	7
(Italy) K Knapp	6	1	5
Q	(Russia) A Kudryavtseva	1	4
2	(Russia) M Sharapova	6	6

Fourth round
14	(Switzerland) P Schnyder	6	4	7
2	(Russia) M Sharapova	3	6	9

== Championship match statistics ==
Category	(Belgium) Henin	(Serbia) Ivanovic
1st serve %	32/44 (73%)	27/44 (61%)
1st serve points won	22 of 32 = 69%	14 of 27 = 52%
2nd serve points won	9 of 12 = 75%	6 of 17 = 35%
Total service points won	31 of 44 = 70.45%	20 of 44 = 45.45%
Aces	0	0
Double faults	0	5
Winners	8	5
Unforced errors	14	31
Net points won	12 of 18 = 67%	3 of 11 = 27%
Break points converted	5 of 7 = 71%	1 of 3 = 33%
Return points won	24 of 44 = 55%	13 of 44 = 30%
Total points won	55	33

== Notes ==
Preceded by 2007 Australian Open – Women's singles	Grand Slam women's singles	Succeeded by 2007 Wimbledon Championships – Women's singles
