= 2008 Wimbledon Championships – Women's doubles qualifying =

Women's doubles qualifying
- 2008 Wimbledon Championships

Events
Singles	men	women		boys	girls
Doubles	men	women	mixed	boys	girls
WC Singles	men	women	quad
WC Doubles	men	women	quad
Legends	men	women	seniors

Qualification
Singles	men	women
Doubles	men	women
- Wimbledon Championships

Players and pairs who neither have high enough rankings nor receive wild cards may participate in a qualifying tournament held one week before the annual Wimbledon Tennis Championships.

== Seeds ==
1. (Russia) Maria Kirilenko / (Italy) Flavia Pennetta (qualified)
2. (United States) Raquel Kops-Jones / (United States) Abigail Spears (qualified)
3. (Russia) Alina Jidkova / (United States) Lilia Osterloh (qualifying competition)
4. (Hungary) Melinda Czink / (Turkey) İpek Şenoğlu (first round)
5. (United States) Christina Fusano / (United States) Angela Haynes (qualifying competition, lucky losers)
6. (Japan) Ayumi Morita / (Japan) Junri Namigata (qualifying competition, lucky losers)
7. (Argentina) Jorgelina Cravero / (Argentina) Betina Jozami (qualified)
8. (Estonia) Maret Ani / (France) Séverine Bremond (first round)

== Qualifiers ==
1. (Russia) Maria Kirilenko / (Italy) Flavia Pennetta
2. (United States) Raquel Kops-Jones / (United States) Abigail Spears
3. (Argentina) Jorgelina Cravero / (Argentina) Betina Jozami
4. (Czech Republic) Andrea Hlaváčková / (Ukraine) Olga Savchuk

== Lucky losers ==
1. (United States) Christina Fusano / (United States) Angela Haynes
2. (Japan) Ayumi Morita / (Japan) Junri Namigata
3. (United Kingdom) Anna Smith / (United Kingdom) Georgie Stoop

== Qualifying draw ==
=== First qualifier ===
First round
1	(Russia) Maria Kirilenko (Italy) Flavia Pennetta	6	6
(United States) Julie Ditty (Canada) Stéphanie Dubois	4	4
(France) Mathilde Johansson (France) Olivia Sanchez	2	3
5	(United States) Christina Fusano (United States) Angela Haynes	6	6

Qualifying competition
1	(Russia) Maria Kirilenko (Italy) Flavia Pennetta	7^{7}	6
5	(United States) Christina Fusano (United States) Angela Haynes	6^{4}	2

=== Second qualifier ===
First round
2	(United States) Raquel Kops-Jones (United States) Abigail Spears	7^{11}	6
(Germany) Julia Görges (Canada) Marie-Ève Pelletier	6^{9}	3
(Russia) Ekaterina Bychkova (Russia) Evgeniya Rodina	6	4	1
6	(Japan) Ayumi Morita (Japan) Junri Namigata	4	6	6

Qualifying competition
2	(United States) Raquel Kops-Jones (United States) Abigail Spears	4	6	6
6	(Japan) Ayumi Morita (Japan) Junri Namigata	6	2	4

=== Third qualifier ===
First round
3	(Russia) Alina Jidkova (United States) Lilia Osterloh	7	6
WC	(United Kingdom) Jade Curtis (United Kingdom) Elizabeth Thomas	5	0
(Brazil) Maria Fernanda Alves (Paraguay) Rossana de los Ríos	3	2
7	(Argentina) Jorgelina Cravero (Argentina) Betina Jozami	6	6

Qualifying competition
3	(Russia) Alina Jidkova (United States) Lilia Osterloh	6	5	1
7	(Argentina) Jorgelina Cravero (Argentina) Betina Jozami	2	7	6

=== Fourth qualifier ===
First round
4	(Hungary) Melinda Czink (Turkey) İpek Şenoğlu	6	4	1
(Czech Republic) Andrea Hlaváčková (Ukraine) Olga Savchuk	3	6	6
WC	(United Kingdom) Anna Smith (United Kingdom) Georgie Stoop	5	6	6
8	(Estonia) Maret Ani (France) Séverine Bremond	7	3	4

Qualifying competition
(Czech Republic) Andrea Hlaváčková (Ukraine) Olga Savchuk	6	6
WC	(United Kingdom) Anna Smith (United Kingdom) Georgie Stoop	3	3
