= 2008 Wimbledon Championships – Women's singles qualifying =

Women's singles qualifying
- 2008 Wimbledon Championships

Events
Singles	men	women		boys	girls
Doubles	men	women	mixed	boys	girls
WC Singles	men	women	quad
WC Doubles	men	women	quad
Legends	men	women	seniors

Qualification
Singles	men	women
Doubles	men	women
- Wimbledon Championships

Players and pairs who neither have high enough rankings nor receive wild cards may participate in a qualifying tournament held one week before the annual Wimbledon Tennis Championships.

== Seeds ==
1. (France) Olivia Sanchez (first round)
2. (Japan) Ayumi Morita (first round)
3. (Czech Republic) Barbora Záhlavová-Strýcová (qualified)
4. (France) Séverine Brémond (qualified)
5. (Spain) Lourdes Domínguez Lino (second round)
6. (Russia) Anna Lapushchenkova (first round)
7. (Australia) Alicia Molik (first round)
8. (France) Stéphanie Foretz (qualified)
9. (Slovakia) Magdaléna Rybáriková (qualified)
10. (United States) Lilia Osterloh (second round)
11. (Hungary) Melinda Czink (first round)
12. (France) Mathilde Johansson (qualified)
13. (Slovenia) Andreja Klepač (second round)
14. (Russia) Yaroslava Shvedova (second round)
15. (Russia) Olga Puchkova (qualifying competition)
16. (Belarus) Anastasiya Yakimova (qualifying competition)
17. (Russia) Vesna Manasieva (second round)
18. (Ukraine) Yuliana Fedak (second round)
19. (Italy) Roberta Vinci (second round)
20. (Russia) Anastasia Pavlyuchenkova (qualified)
21. (Croatia) Jelena Kostanić Tošić (qualifying competition)
22. (Spain) María José Martínez Sánchez (qualified)
23. (Switzerland) Emmanuelle Gagliardi (first round)
24. (Italy) Maria Elena Camerin (qualified)

== Qualifiers ==
1. (Russia) Anastasia Pavlyuchenkova
2. (Czech Republic) Zuzana Ondrášková
3. (Czech Republic) Barbora Záhlavová-Strýcová
4. (France) Séverine Brémond
5. (Spain) María José Martínez Sánchez
6. (Ukraine) Viktoriya Kutuzova
7. (Italy) Maria Elena Camerin
8. (France) Stéphanie Foretz
9. (Slovakia) Magdaléna Rybáriková
10. (Japan) Rika Fujiwara
11. (Czech Republic) Eva Hrdinová
12. (France) Mathilde Johansson

== Qualifying draw ==
=== First qualifier ===
First round
1	(France) Olivia Sanchez	6^{5}	1
(Germany) Kathrin Wörle	7^{7}	6
(Sweden) Johanna Larsson	6	7
(Australia) Jessica Moore	3	5
Alt	(Ukraine) Yevgenia Savranska	7^{7}	6
(Georgia (country)) Margalita Chakhnashvili	6^{3}	3
(Hungary) Kira Nagy	2	6	3
20	(Russia) Anastasia Pavlyuchenkova	6	3	6

Second round
(Germany) Kathrin Wörle	6	6^{6}	6
(Sweden) Johanna Larsson	4	7^{8}	2
Alt	(Ukraine) Yevgenia Savranska	2	1
20	(Russia) Anastasia Pavlyuchenkova	6	6

Qualifying competition
(Germany) Kathrin Wörle	3	0
20	(Russia) Anastasia Pavlyuchenkova	6	6

=== Second qualifier ===
First round
2	(Japan) Ayumi Morita	1	4
(Czech Republic) Zuzana Ondrášková	6	6
WC	(United Kingdom) Anna Smith	3	7^{7}	6
(France) Julie Coin	6	6^{4}	3
(Portugal) Neuza Silva	4	6	4
(United States) Alexandra Stevenson	6	4	6
(Belarus) Ekaterina Dzehalevich	6	6
23	(Switzerland) Emmanuelle Gagliardi	3	4

Second round
(Czech Republic) Zuzana Ondrášková	6	4	6
WC	(United Kingdom) Anna Smith	1	6	2
(United States) Alexandra Stevenson	3	2
(Belarus) Ekaterina Dzehalevich	6	6

Qualifying competition
(Czech Republic) Zuzana Ondrášková	6	6
(Belarus) Ekaterina Dzehalevich	3	2

=== Third qualifier ===
First round
3	(Czech Republic) Barbora Záhlavová-Strýcová	6^{3}	6	8
(Germany) Gréta Arn	7^{7}	3	6
(United States) Angela Haynes	4	3
(Russia) Ekaterina Ivanova	6	6
WC	(United Kingdom) Georgie Stoop	3	3
(Slovakia) Jarmila Gajdošová	6	6
WC	(United Kingdom) Sarah Borwell	4	7^{7}	4
14	(Russia) Yaroslava Shvedova	6	6^{5}	6

Second round
3	(Czech Republic) Barbora Záhlavová-Strýcová	6	6
(Russia) Ekaterina Ivanova	3	1
(Slovakia) Jarmila Gajdošová	6	7^{7}
14	(Russia) Yaroslava Shvedova	2	6^{4}

Qualifying competition
3	(Czech Republic) Barbora Záhlavová-Strýcová	6	6
(Slovakia) Jarmila Gajdošová	3	4

=== Fourth qualifier ===
First round
4	(France) Séverine Brémond	6	6
(Canada) Marie-Ève Pelletier	4	2
(Ukraine) Tetiana Luzhanska	6	4	0
(South Africa) Chanelle Scheepers	4	6	6
(France) Youlia Fedossova	6	6
(Brazil) Teliana Pereira	2	2
WC	(United Kingdom) Anna Fitzpatrick	4	3
18	(Ukraine) Yuliana Fedak	6	6

Second round
4	(France) Séverine Brémond	3	6	6
(South Africa) Chanelle Scheepers	6	3	2
(France) Youlia Fedossova	6	6
18	(Ukraine) Yuliana Fedak	4	2

Qualifying competition
4	(France) Séverine Brémond	6	6
(France) Youlia Fedossova	0	4

=== Fifth qualifier ===
First round
5	(Spain) Lourdes Domínguez Lino	3	6	6
(Czech Republic) Lucie Hradecká	6	3	2
(Italy) Corinna Dentoni	6	7^{7}
(United States) Abigail Spears	3	6^{4}
(Colombia) Mariana Duque Mariño	6	4	6
(Brazil) Maria Fernanda Alves	4	6	1
(Japan) Akiko Yonemura	4	4
22	(Spain) María José Martínez Sánchez	6	6

Second round
5	(Spain) Lourdes Domínguez Lino	2	6	3
(Italy) Corinna Dentoni	6	2	6
(Colombia) Mariana Duque Mariño	7	1	3
22	(Spain) María José Martínez Sánchez	5	6	6

Qualifying competition
(Italy) Corinna Dentoni	5	7	3
22	(Spain) María José Martínez Sánchez	7	5	6

=== Sixth qualifier ===
First round
6	(Russia) Anna Lapushchenkova	1	2
(Ukraine) Viktoriya Kutuzova	6	6
(Croatia) Nika Ožegović	6	4	6
(Bosnia and Herzegovina) Sandra Martinović	4	6	3
(Germany) Kristina Barrois	6	6
(Germany) Angelika Bachmann	4	3
(Croatia) Jelena Pandžić	2	4
19	(Italy) Roberta Vinci	6	6

Second round
(Ukraine) Viktoriya Kutuzova	6	6
(Croatia) Nika Ožegović	2	3
(Germany) Kristina Barrois	7^{7}	6
19	(Italy) Roberta Vinci	6^{5}	4

Qualifying competition
(Ukraine) Viktoriya Kutuzova	5	6	7
(Germany) Kristina Barrois	7	2	5

=== Seventh qualifier ===
First round
7	(Australia) Alicia Molik	6^{5}	6	3
(Belarus) Tatiana Poutchek	7^{7}	1	6
(Estonia) Margit Rüütel	6	2	6
(Czech Republic) Hana Šromová	0	6	8
(Ukraine) Oxana Lyubtsova	6	6
(United States) Varvara Lepchenko	4	4
(Australia) Monique Adamczak	4	6^{3}
24	(Italy) Maria Elena Camerin	6	7^{7}

Second round
(Belarus) Tatiana Poutchek	6	6^{5}	6
(Czech Republic) Hana Šromová	2	7^{7}	3
(Ukraine) Oxana Lyubtsova	2	5
24	(Italy) Maria Elena Camerin	6	7

Qualifying competition
(Belarus) Tatiana Poutchek	7^{7}	3	5
24	(Italy) Maria Elena Camerin	6^{1}	6	7

=== Eighth qualifier ===
First round
8	(France) Stéphanie Foretz	6	2	6
(Portugal) Michelle Larcher de Brito	0	6	4
PR	(United States) Mashona Washington	5	6	4
(Poland) Anna Korzeniak	7	3	6
(Japan) Junri Namigata	4	7^{7}	6
(Argentina) Betina Jozami	6	6^{2}	2
(South Korea) Lee Ye-ra	1	6	2
16	(Belarus) Anastasiya Yakimova	6	4	6

Second round
8	(France) Stéphanie Foretz	6	6
(Poland) Anna Korzeniak	2	2
(Japan) Junri Namigata	4	7	0
16	(Belarus) Anastasiya Yakimova	6	5	6

Qualifying competition
8	(France) Stéphanie Foretz	6	6
16	(Belarus) Anastasiya Yakimova	2	1

=== Ninth qualifier ===
First round
9	(Slovakia) Magdaléna Rybáriková	6	6
(Romania) Anda Perianu	4	2
WC	(United Kingdom) Elizabeth Thomas	3	1
(Bulgaria) Sesil Karatantcheva	6	6
(Italy) Alberta Brianti	2	1
(Russia) Regina Kulikova	6	6
(France) Virginie Pichet	3	1
13	(Slovenia) Andreja Klepač	6	6

Second round
9	(Slovakia) Magdaléna Rybáriková	6	6
(Bulgaria) Sesil Karatantcheva	3	3
(Russia) Regina Kulikova	6	6
13	(Slovenia) Andreja Klepač	3	3

Qualifying competition
9	(Slovakia) Magdaléna Rybáriková	7	6
(Russia) Regina Kulikova	5	2

=== Tenth qualifier ===
First round
10	(United States) Lilia Osterloh	7	4	13
(Switzerland) Stefanie Vögele	5	6	11
(Japan) Kumiko Iijima	6	6
(Argentina) Soledad Esperón	3	2
(Japan) Rika Fujiwara	6	6
WC	(United Kingdom) Naomi Broady	3	0
(Latvia) Anastasija Sevastova	2	4
17	(Russia) Vesna Manasieva	6	6

Second round
10	(United States) Lilia Osterloh	2	6	5
(Japan) Kumiko Iijima	6	4	7
(Japan) Rika Fujiwara	3	6	12
17	(Russia) Vesna Manasieva	6	0	10

Qualifying competition
(Japan) Kumiko Iijima	4	2
(Japan) Rika Fujiwara	6	6

=== Eleventh qualifier ===
First round
11	(Hungary) Melinda Czink	6^{1}	6	2
(Russia) Alina Jidkova	7^{7}	3	6
(China) Sun Tiantian	6	4	1
(Czech Republic) Eva Hrdinová	2	6	6
(United States) Raquel Kops-Jones	7	5	4
(United States) Sunitha Rao	5	7	6
WC	(United Kingdom) Tara Moore	6	6^{0}	4
15	(Russia) Olga Puchkova	4	7^{7}	6

Second round
(Russia) Alina Jidkova	7^{7}	2	5
(Czech Republic) Eva Hrdinová	6^{1}	6	7
(United States) Sunitha Rao	4	2
15	(Russia) Olga Puchkova	6	6

Qualifying competition
(Czech Republic) Eva Hrdinová	6	6
15	(Russia) Olga Puchkova	4	1

=== Twelfth qualifier ===
First round
12	(France) Mathilde Johansson	7	6
(Argentina) Jorgelina Cravero	5	3
(Belgium) Kirsten Flipkens	6	6
(Romania) Ágnes Szatmári	2	3
WC	(United Kingdom) Amanda Elliott	7^{7}	7
(Japan) Natsumi Hamamura	6^{0}	5
(Australia) Christina Wheeler	2	3
21	(Croatia) Jelena Kostanić Tošić	6	6

Second round
12	(France) Mathilde Johansson	6	6
(Belgium) Kirsten Flipkens	0	1
WC	(United Kingdom) Amanda Elliott	4	6	6
21	(Croatia) Jelena Kostanić Tošić	6	2	8

Qualifying competition
12	(France) Mathilde Johansson	6	6
21	(Croatia) Jelena Kostanić Tošić	4	3
