= 2008 Wimbledon Championships – Men's doubles qualifying =

Men's doubles qualifying
- 2008 Wimbledon Championships

Events
Singles	men	women		boys	girls
Doubles	men	women	mixed	boys	girls
WC Singles	men	women	quad
WC Doubles	men	women	quad
Legends	men	women	seniors

Qualification
Singles	men	women
Doubles	men	women
- Wimbledon Championships

Players and pairs who neither have high enough rankings nor receive wild cards may participate in a qualifying tournament held one week before the annual Wimbledon Tennis Championships.

== Seeds ==
1. (United States) Robert Kendrick / (United States) Alex Kuznetsov (qualifying competition)
2. (Romania) Florin Mergea / (Romania) Horia Tecău (first round)
3. (Sweden) Johan Brunström / (Australia) Adam Feeney (qualifying competition, lucky losers)
4. (Czech Republic) Petr Pála / (Slovakia) Igor Zelenay (qualified)
5. (Russia) Mikhail Elgin / (Russia) Alexander Kudryavtsev (qualifying competition, lucky losers)
6. (Netherlands) Jasper Smit / (Netherlands Antilles) Martijn van Haasteren (first round)
7. (United States) Amer Delic / (United States) Brendan Evans (qualified)
8. (Portugal) Frederico Gil / (Belgium) Dick Norman (qualified)

== Qualifiers ==
1. (United States) Amer Delic / (United States) Brendan Evans
2. (Portugal) Frederico Gil / (Belgium) Dick Norman
3. (United States) K. J. Hippensteel / (United States) Tripp Phillips
4. (Czech Republic) Petr Pála / (Slovakia) Igor Zelenay

== Lucky losers ==
1. (Sweden) Johan Brunström / (Australia) Adam Feeney
2. (Russia) Mikhail Elgin / (Russia) Alexander Kudryavtsev
3. (United States) Hugo Armando / (United States) Jesse Levine

== Qualifying draw ==
=== First qualifier ===
First round
1	(United States) Robert Kendrick (United States) Alex Kuznetsov	6	7^{7}
WC	(United Kingdom) Neil Pauffley (United Kingdom) Marcus Willis	3	6^{3}
(Ukraine) Sergei Bubka (Ukraine) Sergiy Stakhovsky	6^{3}	4
7	(United States) Amer Delic (United States) Brendan Evans	7^{7}	6

Qualifying competition
1	(United States) Robert Kendrick (United States) Alex Kuznetsov	6	3	4
7	(United States) Amer Delic (United States) Brendan Evans	3	6	6

=== Second qualifier ===
First round
2	(Romania) Florin Mergea (Romania) Horia Tecău	6^{5}	2
(United States) Hugo Armando (United States) Jesse Levine	7^{7}	6
WC	(United Kingdom) Edward Seator (United Kingdom) Daniel Smethurst	2	4
8	(Portugal) Frederico Gil (Belgium) Dick Norman	6	6

Qualifying competition
(United States) Hugo Armando (United States) Jesse Levine	4	4
8	(Portugal) Frederico Gil (Belgium) Dick Norman	6	6

=== Third qualifier ===
First round
3	(Sweden) Johan Brunström (Australia) Adam Feeney	6	6
(United States) Patrick Briaud (Russia) Mikhail Kukushkin	4	2
(United States) K. J. Hippensteel (United States) Tripp Phillips	6	6
6	(Netherlands) Jasper Smit (Netherlands Antilles) Martijn van Haasteren	3	3

Qualifying competition
3	(Sweden) Johan Brunström (Australia) Adam Feeney	6	5	6
(United States) K. J. Hippensteel (United States) Tripp Phillips	2	7	8

=== Fourth qualifier ===
First round
4	(Czech Republic) Petr Pála (Slovakia) Igor Zelenay	6	6
(Japan) Go Soeda (Brazil) Márcio Torres	2	3
(Australia) Alun Jones (United States) Sam Warburg	6^{8}	3
5	(Russia) Mikhail Elgin (Russia) Alexander Kudryavtsev	7^{10}	6

Qualifying competition
4	(Czech Republic) Petr Pála (Slovakia) Igor Zelenay	6	6
5	(Russia) Mikhail Elgin (Russia) Alexander Kudryavtsev	1	2
