= 2008 Wimbledon Championships – Men's singles qualifying =

Men's singles qualifying
- 2008 Wimbledon Championships

Events
Singles	men	women		boys	girls
Doubles	men	women	mixed	boys	girls
WC Singles	men	women	quad
WC Doubles	men	women	quad
Legends	men	women	seniors

Qualification
Singles	men	women
Doubles	men	women
- Wimbledon Championships

Players and pairs who neither have high enough rankings nor receive wild cards may participate in a qualifying tournament held one week before the annual Wimbledon Tennis Championships.

== Seeds ==
1. (Luxembourg) Gilles Müller (second round)
2. (Belgium) Christophe Rochus (qualified)
3. (Portugal) Frederico Gil (qualified)
4. (Germany) Philipp Petzschner (qualified)
5. (United States) Robert Kendrick (qualifying competition)
6. (Japan) Go Soeda (second round)
7. (Denmark) Kristian Pless (second round)
8. (Chile) Paul Capdeville (second round)
9. (Italy) Flavio Cipolla (qualifying competition)
10. (United States) Amer Delic (first round)
11. (United States) Sam Warburg (first round)
12. (Spain) Iván Navarro (first round)
13. (Ukraine) Sergiy Stakhovsky (qualified)
14. (Switzerland) Stéphane Bohli (second round)
15. (Russia) Mikhail Kukushkin (first round)
16. (South Africa) Rik de Voest (qualifying competition)
17. (Czech Republic) Jan Hernych (qualified)
18. (United States) Jesse Levine (qualified)
19. (Germany) Andreas Beck (qualified)
20. (Australia) Alun Jones (first round)
21. (Russia) Andrey Golubev (second round)
22. (Pakistan) Aisam-ul-Haq Qureshi (second round)
23. (France) Édouard Roger-Vasselin (qualified)
24. (Romania) Adrian Cruciat (qualifying competition)
25. (Argentina) Leonardo Mayer (first round)
26. (France) Olivier Patience (qualifying competition)
27. (Israel) Harel Levy (first round)
28. (Serbia) Dušan Vemić (first round)
29. (Australia) Joseph Sirianni (first round)
30. (Russia) Mikhail Ledovskikh (first round)
31. (Netherlands) Peter Wessels (withdrew)
32. (Germany) Simon Stadler (qualified)

== Qualifiers ==
1. (Germany) Andreas Beck
2. (Belgium) Christophe Rochus
3. (Portugal) Frederico Gil
4. (Germany) Philipp Petzschner
5. (United States) Kevin Kim
6. (France) Édouard Roger-Vasselin
7. (South Africa) Izak van der Merwe
8. (United States) Jesse Levine
9. (Czech Republic) Pavel Šnobel
10. (Italy) Stefano Galvani
11. (Austria) Alexander Peya
12. (Czech Republic) Jan Hernych
13. (Ukraine) Sergiy Stakhovsky
14. (Germany) Simon Stadler
15. (United Kingdom) Chris Eaton
16. (Poland) Dawid Olejniczak

== Lucky losers ==
1. (Serbia) Ilija Bozoljac
2. (Germany) Tobias Kamke

== Qualifying draw ==
=== First qualifier ===
First round
1	(Luxembourg) Gilles Müller	6^{7}	6	6
(Turkey) Marsel İlhan	7^{9}	4	4
(Spain) Fernando Vicente	3	6^{4}
(Czech Republic) Jaroslav Pospíšil	6	7^{7}
(United States) Brendan Evans	6	6
(Spain) Marc Fornell Mestres	2	2
(Italy) Paolo Lorenzi	1	7^{7}	3
19	(Germany) Andreas Beck	6	6^{5}	6

Second round
1	(Luxembourg) Gilles Müller	6^{10}	6^{3}
(Czech Republic) Jaroslav Pospíšil	7^{12}	7^{7}
(United States) Brendan Evans	3	6	4
19	(Germany) Andreas Beck	6	4	6

Qualifying competition
(Czech Republic) Jaroslav Pospíšil	3	1	5
19	(Germany) Andreas Beck	6	6	7

=== Second qualifier ===
First round
2	(Belgium) Christophe Rochus	6	6
(Russia) Mikhail Elgin	4	3
(United States) Ryan Sweeting	3	7^{7}	7
(United States) Scoville Jenkins	6	6^{3}	5
(Spain) Adrián Menéndez Maceiras	2	0
(Brazil) Ricardo Mello	6	6
(Austria) Martin Fischer	6^{1}	6	6
Alt	(Republic of Ireland) Conor Niland	7^{7}	4	4

Second round
2	(Belgium) Christophe Rochus	6	6
(United States) Ryan Sweeting	3	4
(Brazil) Ricardo Mello	5	7	4
(Austria) Martin Fischer	7	5	6

Qualifying competition
2	(Belgium) Christophe Rochus	6	6	6
(Austria) Martin Fischer	1	3	4

=== Third qualifier ===
First round
3	(Portugal) Frederico Gil	6	3	6
(Germany) Dominik Meffert	4	6	4
(Israel) Noam Okun	6	6
WC	(United Kingdom) Ken Skupski	4	2
(France) Sébastien de Chaunac	4	5
(South Africa) Wesley Moodie	6	7
(United States) Hugo Armando	6	6
30	(Russia) Mikhail Ledovskikh	3	4

Second round
3	(Portugal) Frederico Gil	6	6
(Israel) Noam Okun	1	3
(South Africa) Wesley Moodie	6	6^{5}	4
(United States) Hugo Armando	2	7^{7}	6

Qualifying competition
3	(Portugal) Frederico Gil	6	7^{7}	4	7^{7}
(United States) Hugo Armando	2	6^{5}	6	6^{3}

=== Fourth qualifier ===
First round
4	(Germany) Philipp Petzschner	6	4
WC	(United Kingdom) Morgan Phillips	2	2^{r}
(Argentina) Cristian Villagrán	3	4
(Germany) Daniel Brands	6	6
(Argentina) Juan-Martín Aranguren	3	2
(Austria) Martin Slanar	6	6
(Spain) Gabriel Trujillo Soler	1	1^{r}
24	(Romania) Adrian Cruciat	6	2

Second round
4	(Germany) Philipp Petzschner	3	6	6
(Germany) Daniel Brands	6	4	1
(Austria) Martin Slanar	2	5
24	(Romania) Adrian Cruciat	6	7

Qualifying competition
4	(Germany) Philipp Petzschner	6	5	5	6	6
24	(Romania) Adrian Cruciat	4	7	7	2	3

=== Fifth qualifier ===
First round
5	(United States) Robert Kendrick	6	6
(Canada) Peter Polansky	4	2
(United Kingdom) Josh Goodall	6	6
(Slovakia) Ivo Klec	4	3
WC	(United Kingdom) Jonathan Marray	4	5
(United States) Kevin Kim	6	7
(United States) Alex Bogomolov Jr.	7^{8}	7^{7}
29	(Australia) Joseph Sirianni	6^{6}	6^{3}

Second round
5	(United States) Robert Kendrick	6	6
(United Kingdom) Josh Goodall	4	4
(United States) Kevin Kim	6	7^{7}
(United States) Alex Bogomolov Jr.	4	6^{5}

Qualifying competition
5	(United States) Robert Kendrick	6	3	4	4
(United States) Kevin Kim	3	6	6	6

=== Sixth qualifier ===
First round
6	(Japan) Go Soeda	6	6
(Italy) Francesco Aldi	4	4
PR	(Poland) Michał Przysiężny	7^{7}	7^{9}
(United States) Rajeev Ram	6^{3}	6^{7}
(Republic of Ireland) Louk Sorensen	6	6
WC	(United Kingdom) Edward Seator	2	1
(France) Augustin Gensse	2	0
23	(France) Édouard Roger-Vasselin	6	6

Second round
6	(Japan) Go Soeda	6	4	8
PR	(Poland) Michał Przysiężny	4	6	10
(Republic of Ireland) Louk Sorensen	7^{7}	3	1^{r}
23	(France) Édouard Roger-Vasselin	6^{4}	6	3

Qualifying competition
PR	(Poland) Michał Przysiężny	2	1	1
23	(France) Édouard Roger-Vasselin	6	6	6

=== Seventh qualifier ===
First round
7	(Denmark) Kristian Pless	6^{4}	7^{7}	6
(France) Gary Lugassy	7^{7}	6^{5}	3
(South Africa) Izak van der Merwe	6	6
(Spain) Miguel Ángel López Jaén	3	1
(South Korea) Jun Woong-sun	4	6^{5}
(Czech Republic) Lukáš Dlouhý	6	7^{7}
(Canada) Frédéric Niemeyer	6	7
27	(Israel) Harel Levy	2	5

Second round
7	(Denmark) Kristian Pless	5	6^{8}
(South Africa) Izak van der Merwe	7	7^{10}
(Czech Republic) Lukáš Dlouhý	3	3
(Canada) Frédéric Niemeyer	6	6

Qualifying competition
(South Africa) Izak van der Merwe	6	6	1	6
(Canada) Frédéric Niemeyer	3	3	6	3

=== Eighth qualifier ===
First round
8	(Chile) Paul Capdeville	3	6	6
(Italy) Francesco Piccari	6	2	3
(Spain) Marc López	5	4
(Russia) Alexander Kudryavtsev	7	6
(France) Adrian Mannarino	6	2^{r}
(Russia) Pavel Chekhov	3	3
PR	(Georgia (country)) Irakli Labadze	2	3
18	(United States) Jesse Levine	6	6

Second round
8	(Chile) Paul Capdeville	6^{5}	6	6
(Russia) Alexander Kudryavtsev	7^{7}	4	8
(Russia) Pavel Chekhov	3	7^{10}	9
18	(United States) Jesse Levine	6	6^{8}	11

Qualifying competition
(Russia) Alexander Kudryavtsev	4	3	4
18	(United States) Jesse Levine	6	6	6

=== Ninth qualifier ===
First round
9	(Italy) Flavio Cipolla	6	6
(Brazil) João Souza	3	0
(Belarus) Max Mirnyi	6	6
(Slovakia) Karol Beck	4	4
(France) Antony Dupuis	6	7
(Australia) Adam Feeney	2	5
(Czech Republic) Pavel Šnobel	7	4	10
28	(Serbia) Dušan Vemić	5	6	8

Second round
9	(Italy) Flavio Cipolla	7^{7}	6
(Belarus) Max Mirnyi	6^{5}	3
(France) Antony Dupuis	3	4
(Czech Republic) Pavel Šnobel	6	6

Qualifying competition
9	(Italy) Flavio Cipolla	0	4	3
(Czech Republic) Pavel Šnobel	6	6	6

=== Tenth qualifier ===
First round
10	(United States) Amer Delic	3	7^{7}	3
(Australia) Robert Smeets	6	6^{5}	6
(United States) Nicholas Monroe	0	2
(Serbia) Ilija Bozoljac	6	6
(Chinese Taipei) Wang Yeu-tzuoo	1	2
(Italy) Stefano Galvani	6	6
(France) Jean-Christophe Faurel	6^{5}	4
21	(Russia) Andrey Golubev	7^{7}	6

Second round
(Australia) Robert Smeets	6	6^{2}	3
(Serbia) Ilija Bozoljac	3	7^{7}	6
(Italy) Stefano Galvani	7	6
21	(Russia) Andrey Golubev	5	2

Qualifying competition
(Serbia) Ilija Bozoljac	6	0	1	6	4
(Italy) Stefano Galvani	3	6	6	2	6

=== Eleventh qualifier ===
First round
11	(United States) Sam Warburg	2	4
(Austria) Alexander Peya	6	6
(Sweden) Filip Prpic	3	3
(United States) Alberto Francis	6	6
WC	(United Kingdom) Richard Bloomfield	6	7
(Portugal) Rui Machado	3	5
(France) Thomas Oger	6	6
20	(Australia) Alun Jones	0	0

Second round
(Austria) Alexander Peya	6	3	6
(United States) Alberto Francis	3	6	2
WC	(United Kingdom) Richard Bloomfield	6	6
(France) Thomas Oger	2	0

Qualifying competition
(Austria) Alexander Peya	6	6	3	1	8
WC	(United Kingdom) Richard Bloomfield	4	4	6	6	6

=== Twelfth qualifier ===
First round
12	(Spain) Iván Navarro	6^{4}	3
(Sweden) Björn Rehnquist	7^{7}	6
(Germany) Tobias Kamke	6	6
(Thailand) Danai Udomchoke	3	4
(United States) Alex Kuznetsov	2	6	3
(Chinese Taipei) Chen Ti	6	3	6
(Australia) Andrew Coelho	4	6^{3}
17	(Czech Republic) Jan Hernych	6	7^{7}

Second round
(Sweden) Björn Rehnquist	6^{7}	1
(Germany) Tobias Kamke	7^{9}	6
(Chinese Taipei) Chen Ti	3	1
17	(Czech Republic) Jan Hernych	6	6

Qualifying competition
(Germany) Tobias Kamke	3	6^{4}	6^{2}
17	(Czech Republic) Jan Hernych	6	7^{7}	7^{7}

=== Thirteenth qualifier ===
First round
13	(Ukraine) Sergiy Stakhovsky	6	6
(United States) Todd Widom	2	3
(Monaco) Jean-René Lisnard	2	6^{4}
(India) Prakash Amritraj	6	7^{7}
(Spain) David Marrero	4	7	6
(Czech Republic) Tomáš Zíb	6	5	3
(Mexico) Santiago González	6	7^{7}
25	(Argentina) Leonardo Mayer	3	6^{5}

Second round
13	(Ukraine) Sergiy Stakhovsky	6	1	6
(India) Prakash Amritraj	3	6	3
(Spain) David Marrero	4	6	4
(Mexico) Santiago González	6	4	6

Qualifying competition
13	(Ukraine) Sergiy Stakhovsky	6	6	7
(Mexico) Santiago González	3	4	5

=== Fourteenth qualifier ===
First round
14	(Switzerland) Stéphane Bohli	6	6
(Poland) Łukasz Kubot	4	0
(Argentina) Nicolás Todero	6	6
(Switzerland) George Bastl	4	4
(Austria) Rainer Eitzinger	5	6	6
(Czech Republic) Jan Mertl	7	2	1
WC	(United Kingdom) Daniel Cox	2	2
32	(Germany) Simon Stadler	6	6

Second round
14	(Switzerland) Stéphane Bohli	7^{7}	5	2
(Argentina) Nicolás Todero	6^{3}	7	6
(Austria) Rainer Eitzinger	7	1	2
32	(Germany) Simon Stadler	5	6	6

Qualifying competition
(Argentina) Nicolás Todero	7^{12}	6^{5}	6	1	1
32	(Germany) Simon Stadler	6^{10}	7^{7}	3	6	6

=== Fifteenth qualifier ===
First round
15	(Russia) Mikhail Kukushkin	6	4	5
WC	(United Kingdom) Chris Eaton	2	6	7
PR	(United States) K. J. Hippensteel	4	6	0
(Czech Republic) Jan Minář	6	4	6
(Switzerland) Michael Lammer	6	3	3
(Germany) Matthias Bachinger	4	6	6
(United States) Jesse Witten	7^{8}	2	11
26	(France) Olivier Patience	6^{6}	6	13

Second round
WC	(United Kingdom) Chris Eaton	6^{10}	6	6
(Czech Republic) Jan Minář	7^{12}	3	4
(Germany) Matthias Bachinger	6^{5}	7^{7}	3
26	(France) Olivier Patience	7^{7}	6^{4}	6

Qualifying competition
WC	(United Kingdom) Chris Eaton	7^{7}	6	7^{7}
26	(France) Olivier Patience	6^{5}	3	6^{3}

=== Sixteenth qualifier ===
First round
16	(South Africa) Rik de Voest	3	6	6
(Belgium) Dick Norman	6	4	1
(Czech Republic) Jan Vacek	6	6
(Australia) Colin Ebelthite	4	4
(Poland) Dawid Olejniczak	7^{8}	6
(Czech Republic) Lukáš Rosol	6^{6}	4
(France) Josselin Ouanna	6^{5}	3
22	(Pakistan) Aisam-ul-Haq Qureshi	7^{7}	6

Second round
16	(South Africa) Rik de Voest	6	3	9
(Czech Republic) Jan Vacek	2	6	7
(Poland) Dawid Olejniczak	7^{11}	6
22	(Pakistan) Aisam-ul-Haq Qureshi	6^{9}	3

Qualifying competition
16	(South Africa) Rik de Voest	4	4	7^{7}	6	6
(Poland) Dawid Olejniczak	6	6	6^{1}	2	8
