= 2008 US Open – Boys' doubles =

Boys' doubles
- 2008 US Open

Final
- Champion: (Austria) Nikolaus Moser (Germany) Cedrik-Marcel Stebe
- Runner-up: (Finland) Henri Kontinen (Indonesia) Christopher Rungkat
- Score: 7–6(5), 3–6, 10–8

Events
Singles	men	women		boys	girls
Doubles	men	women	mixed	boys	girls
WC Singles	men	women	quad
WC Doubles	men	women	quad
Legends	men	women	mixed
- US Open

Jonathan Eysseric and Jérôme Inzerillo were the defending champions, but did not compete in the Juniors in 2008.

Nikolaus Moser and Cedrik-Marcel Stebe won in the final 7–6^{(7–5)}, 3–6, 10–8, against Henri Kontinen and Christopher Rungkat.

== Seeds ==
1. (Brazil) Henrique Cunha / (Brazil) José Pereira (second round)
2. (Finland) Henri Kontinen / (Indonesia) Christopher Rungkat (final)
3. (United States) Chase Buchanan / (United States) Ryan Harrison (first round)
4. (Australia) Matt Reid / (Australia) Bernard Tomic (second round)
5. (India) Yuki Bhambri / (Serbia) Filip Krajinović (first round)
6. (Thailand) Peerakit Siributwong / (Thailand) Kittipong Wachiramanowong (semifinals)
7. (Chinese Taipei) Hsieh Cheng-peng / (Chinese Taipei) Yang Tsung-hua (quarterfinals)
8. (United Kingdom) Daniel Smethurst / (United Kingdom) Marcus Willis (second round)

== Draw ==
Key

- Q = Qualifier
- WC = Wild card
- LL = Lucky loser
- Alt = Alternate
- ITF = ITF entry
- PR = Protected ranking
- SR = Special ranking
- SE = Special exempt
- JE = Junior exempt
- JR = Junior Accelerator Programme entrant
- CO = College Accelerator Programme entrant
- NG = Next Gen Accelerator Program entrant
- w/o = Walkover
- r = Retired
- d = Defaulted

=== Finals ===
Semifinals
6	(Thailand) Peerakit Siributwong (Thailand) Kittipong Wachiramanowong	2	6	[9]
(Austria) Nikolaus Moser (Germany) Cedrik-Marcel Stebe	6	3	[11]
(El Salvador) Marcelo Arévalo (Puerto Rico) Alex Llompart	1	3
2	(Finland) Henri Kontinen (Indonesia) Christopher Rungkat	6	6

Final
(Austria) Nikolaus Moser (Germany) Cedrik-Marcel Stebe	7^{7}	3	[10]
2	(Finland) Henri Kontinen (Indonesia) Christopher Rungkat	6^{5}	6	[8]

=== Top half ===
First round
1	(Brazil) Henrique Cunha (Brazil) José Pereira	6	6
(Russia) Mikhail Biryukov (Finland) Henri Laaksonen	4	0
WC	(United States) Matthew Kandath (United States) Ryan Lipman	6	3	[10]
(Belgium) Yannik Reuter (Argentina) Juan Vazquez-Valenzuela	2	6	[2]
(Dominican Republic) José Hernández (United States) Ty D Trombetta	6	6
(United States) Alexander Domijan (United States) Jarmere Jenkins	3	2
WC	(United States) Ryan Harrison (United States) Denis Kudla	2	2
6	(Thailand) Peerakit Siributwong (Thailand) Kittipong Wachiramanowong	6	6
4	(Australia) Matt Reid (Australia) Bernard Tomic	6	7^{8}
(France) Julien Obry (France) Adrien Puget	3	6^{6}
(Croatia) Marin Draganja (Slovenia) Blaz Rola	2	3
(Austria) Nikolaus Moser (Germany) Cedrik-Marcel Stebe	6	6
(United States) Tennys Sandgren (United States) James Seal	4	4
(United Kingdom) Daniel Cox (Australia) Dane Propoggia	6	6
(Zimbabwe) Takanyi Garanganga (Egypt) Karim-Mohamed Maamoun	6	4	[10]
5	(India) Yuki Bhambri (Serbia) Filip Krajinović	1	6	[7]

Second round
1	(Brazil) H Cunha (Brazil) J Pereira	3	3
WC	(United States) M Kandath (United States) R Lipman	6	6
(Dominican Republic) J Hernández (United States) T D Trombetta	7	5	[10]
6	(Thailand) P Siributwong (Thailand) K Wachiramanowong	5	7	[12]
4	(Australia) M Reid (Australia) B Tomic	4	7^{7}	[5]
(Austria) N Moser (Germany) C-M Stebe	6	6^{5}	[10]
(United Kingdom) D Cox (Australia) D Propoggia	6	6
(Zimbabwe) T Garanganga (Egypt) K-M Maamoun	3	3

Quarterfinals
WC	(United States) M Kandath (United States) R Lipman	4	6	[7]
6	(Thailand) P Siributwong (Thailand) K Wachiramanowong	6	4	[10]
(Austria) N Moser (Germany) C-M Stebe	4	6	[10]
(United Kingdom) D Cox (Australia) D Propoggia	6	3	[4]

Semifinals
6	(Thailand) P Siributwong (Thailand) K Wachiramanowong	2	6	[9]
(Austria) N Moser (Germany) C-M Stebe	6	3	[11]

=== Bottom half ===
First round
8	(United Kingdom) Daniel Smethurst (United Kingdom) Marcus Willis	6	6
(United States) Bradley Klahn (United States) Rhyne Williams	4	4
WC	(United States) Sekou Bangoura (United States) Nathan Pasha	2	2
(Argentina) Guido Pella (Mexico) César Ramírez	6	6
(El Salvador) Marcelo Arévalo (Puerto Rico) Alex Llompart	6^{4}	6	[10]
(Croatia) Dino Marcan (Germany) Dominik Schultz	7^{7}	3	[3]
(Slovenia) Borut Puc (Colombia) Juan-Carlos Spir	7^{7}	6
3	(United States) Chase Buchanan (United States) Ryan Harrison	6^{5}	4
7	(Chinese Taipei) Hsieh Cheng-peng (Chinese Taipei) Yang Tsung-hua	6	6
WC	(United States) Evan King (United States) Raymond Sarmiento	4	3
(Spain) Pablo Carreno-Busta (Italy) Alessandro Giannessi	6	3	[10]
(United States) Harry Fowler (United States) Johannes Robert Van Overbeek	2	6	[6]
(United States) Devin Britton (United States) Jordan Cox	6	4	[10]
(Japan) Hiroyasu Ehara (Austria) Tristan-Samuel Weissborn	3	6	[7]
(China) Wu Di (Bosnia and Herzegovina) Mirza Bašić	4	6^{4}
2	(Finland) Henri Kontinen (Indonesia) Christopher Rungkat	6	7^{7}

Second round
8	(United Kingdom) D Smethurst (United Kingdom) M Willis	6^{4}	6	[4]
(Argentina) G Pella (Mexico) C Ramírez	7^{7}	4	[10]
(El Salvador) M Arévalo (Puerto Rico) A Llompart	6	4	[10]
(Slovenia) B Puc (Colombia) J-C Spir	3	6	[7]
7	(Chinese Taipei) C-p Hsieh (Chinese Taipei) T-h Yang	6	7^{7}
(Spain) P Carreno-Busta (Italy) A Giannessi	4	6^{4}
(United States) D Britton (United States) J Cox	1	3
2	(Finland) H Kontinen (Indonesia) C Rungkat	6	6

Quarterfinals
(Argentina) G Pella (Mexico) C Ramírez	6^{3}	6	[8]
(El Salvador) M Arévalo (Puerto Rico) A Llompart	7^{7}	4	[10]
7	(Chinese Taipei) C-p Hsieh (Chinese Taipei) T-h Yang	2	4
2	(Finland) H Kontinen (Indonesia) C Rungkat	6	6

Semifinals
(El Salvador) M Arévalo (Puerto Rico) A Llompart	1	3
2	(Finland) H Kontinen (Indonesia) C Rungkat	6	6
