= Borut Puc =

Croatian-Slovenian tennis player

- Country (sports): Croatia; Slovenia
- Residence: Bradenton, Florida, U.S.
- Born: 19 January 1991 (age 34) Bjelovar, SR Croatia, SFR Yugoslavia
- Height: 1.93 m (6 ft 4 in)
- Plays: Left-handed
- Prize money: $29,964

Singles
- Career record: 0–0 (at ATP Tour level, Grand Slam level, and in Davis Cup)
- Career titles: 3 ITF
- Highest ranking: No. 466 (25 July 2011)

Grand Slam singles results
- French Open Junior: 1R (2008)
- Wimbledon Junior: 1R (2008)
- US Open Junior: 2R (2007)

Doubles
- Career record: 0–1 (at ATP Tour level, Grand Slam level, and in Davis Cup)
- Career titles: 0 ITF
- Highest ranking: No. 699 (14 September 2009)

Grand Slam doubles results
- French Open Junior: 1R (2008)
- Wimbledon Junior: 2R (2008)
- US Open Junior: 2R (2008)
- Last updated on: 6 July 2017.

Borut Puc (born 19 January 1991) is a Croatian–Slovenian tennis player.

Puc has a career high ATP singles ranking of 466 achieved on 25 July 2011. He also has a career high ATP doubles ranking of 699 achieved on 14 September 2009.

Puc made his ATP main draw debut at the 2011 ATP Studena Croatia Open in the doubles draw partnering Toni Androić.

Borut Puc is the son of Iztok Puc, Slovenian-Croatian handball player. His grandfather, Hrvoje Horvat, also is a former Croatian handball player.
