= 2008 Wimbledon Championships – Boys' doubles =

Boys' doubles
- 2008 Wimbledon Championships

Final
- Champions: (Chinese Taipei) Hsieh Cheng-peng (Chinese Taipei) Yang Tsung-hua
- Runners-up: (Australia) Matt Reid (Australia) Bernard Tomic
- Score: 6–4, 2–6, 12–10

Events
| Singles | men | women | | boys | girls |
| Doubles | men | women | mixed | boys | girls |
| WC Singles | men | women | quad |
| WC Doubles | men | women | quad |
| Legends | men | women | seniors |
| ← 2007 · | Wimbledon Championships | · 2009 → |

Daniel Alejandro López and Matteo Trevisan were the defending champions but did not compete in the Juniors this year.

Hsieh Cheng-peng and Yang Tsung-hua defeated Matt Reid and Bernard Tomic in the final, 6–4, 2–6, 12–10 to win the boys' doubles tennis title at the 2008 Wimbledon Championships.

== Seeds ==
1. (Brazil) Henrique Cunha / (Mexico) César Ramírez (first round)
2. (United States) Ryan Harrison / (United States) Bradley Klahn (quarterfinals)
3. (Australia) Matt Reid / (Australia) Bernard Tomic (final)
4. (Bulgaria) Grigor Dimitrov / (Finland) Henri Kontinen (second round)
5. (Belgium) Alexandre Folie / (Belgium) David Goffin (semifinals)
6. (El Salvador) Marcelo Arévalo / (Zimbabwe) Takanyi Garanganga (first round)
7. (United States) Jarmere Jenkins / (United States) Chase Buchanan (first round)
8. (Japan) Hiroki Moriya / (Thailand) Peerakit Siributwong (first round)

== Draw ==
=== Key ===
- Q = Qualifier
- WC = Wild card
- LL = Lucky loser
- Alt = Alternate
- SE = Special exempt
- PR = Protected ranking
- ITF = ITF entry
- JE = Junior exempt
- w/o = Walkover
- r = Retired
- d = Defaulted
- SR = Special ranking

=== Finals ===
Semifinals
5 | (Belgium) Alexandre Folie (Belgium) David Goffin | 4 | 7 | 4
3 | (Australia) Matt Reid (Australia) Bernard Tomic | 6 | 5 | 6
(Chinese Taipei) Hsieh Cheng-peng (Chinese Taipei) Yang Tsung-hua | 7^{7} | 2 | 7
(Bosnia and Herzegovina) Mirza Bašić (China) Wu Di | 6^{2} | 6 | 5

Final
3 | (Australia) Matt Reid (Australia) Bernard Tomic | 4 | 6 | 10
(Chinese Taipei) Hsieh Cheng-peng (Chinese Taipei) Yang Tsung-hua | 6 | 2 | 12

=== Top half ===
First round
1 | (Brazil) Henrique Cunha (Mexico) César Ramírez | 3 | 4
(Australia) Alex Sanders (Australia) Mark Verryth | 6 | 6
WC | (United Kingdom) Dominic Hodgson (United Kingdom) Ashley Watling | 4 | 7^{7} | 6
(United Kingdom) Niall Angus (United Kingdom) Michael Thompson | 6 | 6^{1} | 4
(Dominican Republic) José Hernández-Fernández (Chile) Cristóbal Saavedra Corvalán | 2 | 4
(Slovenia) Borut Puc (Colombia) Juan Carlos Spir | 6 | 6
(Japan) Tadayuki Longhi (Thailand) Kittipong Wachiramanowong | 2 | 1
5 | (Belgium) Alexandre Folie (Belgium) David Goffin | 6 | 6
3 | (Australia) Matt Reid (Australia) Bernard Tomic | 6 | 3 | 6
(United Kingdom) Neil Pauffley (United Kingdom) Marcus Willis | 3 | 6 | 3
(United Kingdom) Dan Evans (United Kingdom) Daniel Smethurst | 6 | 6
WC | (United Kingdom) Faris Akhazzan (United Kingdom) Michael Davis | 4 | 4
(Croatia) Marin Draganja (Serbia) Filip Krajinović | 6 | 6
(Spain) Carlos Boluda-Purkiss (United Kingdom) Daniel Cox | 2 | 4
WC | (United Kingdom) Lewis Barnes (United Kingdom) James Marsalek | 1 | 7^{7} | 7
7 | (United States) Chase Buchanan (United States) Jarmere Jenkins | 6 | 6^{4} | 5

Second round
(Australia) A Sanders (Australia) M Verryth | 6 | 7^{7}
WC | (United Kingdom) D Hodgson (United Kingdom) A Watling | 2 | 6^{5}
(Slovenia) B Puc (Colombia) JC Spir | 4 | 4
5 | (Belgium) A Folie (Belgium) D Goffin | 6 | 6
3 | (Australia) M Reid (Australia) B Tomic | 6 | 6
(United Kingdom) D Evans (United Kingdom) D Smethurst | 3 | 4
(Croatia) M Draganja (Serbia) F Krajinović | 4 | 4
(United Kingdom) L Barnes (United Kingdom) J Marsalek | 6 | 6

Quarterfinals
(Australia) A Sanders (Australia) M Verryth | 2 | 5
5 | (Belgium) A Folie (Belgium) D Goffin | 6 | 7
3 | (Australia) M Reid (Australia) B Tomic | 6 | 6
(United Kingdom) L Barnes (United Kingdom) J Marsalek | 3 | 2

Semifinals
5 | (Belgium) A Folie (Belgium) D Goffin | 4 | 7 | 4
3 | (Australia) M Reid (Australia) B Tomic | 6 | 5 | 6

=== Bottom half ===
First round
8 | (Japan) Hiroki Moriya (Thailand) Peerakit Siributwong | 6^{4} | 4
(Chinese Taipei) Hsieh Cheng-peng (Chinese Taipei) Yang Tsung-hua | 7^{7} | 6
(Austria) Nikolaus Moser (Australia) Dane Propoggia | 7^{8} | 0
(Zimbabwe) Mbonisi Ndimande (Indonesia) Christopher Rungkat | 6^{6} | 0^{r}
(Italy) Erik Crepaldi (Japan) Hiroyasu Ehara | 6 | 4 | 6
(United States) Devin Britton (Italy) Giacomo Miccini | 3 | 6 | 2
Alt | (United Kingdom) Alexander Bull (India) Karunuday Singh | 1 | 2
4 | (Bulgaria) Grigor Dimitrov (Finland) Henri Kontinen | 6 | 6
6 | (El Salvador) Marcelo Arévalo (Zimbabwe) Takanyi Garanganga | 7^{7} | 5 | 4
(Canada) Vasek Pospisil (Canada) Milos Raonic | 6^{2} | 7 | 6
(Bosnia and Herzegovina) Mirza Bašić (China) Wu Di | 3 | 6 | 6
(Austria) Philipp Lang (Germany) Cedrik-Marcel Stebe | 6 | 1 | 4
(India) Yuki Bhambri (China) Zhang Ze | 6^{6} | 6 | 9
(Australia) Jared Easton (Australia) Andrew Thomas | 7^{8} | 3 | 11
WC | (United Kingdom) Mathew James (United Kingdom) Matthew Short | 6^{4} | 2
2 | (United States) Ryan Harrison (United States) Bradley Klahn | 7^{7} | 6

Second round
(Chinese Taipei) C-p Hsieh (Chinese Taipei) T-h Yang | 6 | 6
(Austria) N Moser (Australia) D Propoggia | 4 | 1
(Italy) E Crepaldi (Japan) H Ehara
4 | (Bulgaria) G Dimitrov (Finland) H Kontinen | w/o
(Canada) V Pospisil (Canada) M Raonic | 5 | 7^{7} | 3
(Bosnia and Herzegovina) M Bašić (China) D Wu | 7 | 6^{3} | 6
(Australia) J Easton (Australia) A Thomas | 4 | 7^{10} | 3
2 | (United States) R Harrison (United States) B Klahn | 6 | 6^{8} | 6

Quarterfinals
(Chinese Taipei) C-p Hsieh (Chinese Taipei) T-h Yang | 4 | 6 | 6
(Italy) E Crepaldi (Japan) H Ehara | 6 | 3 | 2
(Bosnia and Herzegovina) M Bašić (China) D Wu | 6 | 7
2 | (United States) R Harrison (United States) B Klahn | 1 | 5

Semifinals
(Chinese Taipei) C-p Hsieh (Chinese Taipei) T-h Yang | 7^{7} | 2 | 7
(Bosnia and Herzegovina) M Bašić (China) D Wu | 6^{2} | 6 | 5
