= 2008 Wimbledon Championships – Ladies' invitation doubles =

Ladies' invitation doubles
- 2008 Wimbledon Championships

Final
- Champions: (Czech Republic) Jana Novotná (United States) Kathy Rinaldi
- Runners-up: (United States) Martina Navratilova (Czech Republic) Helena Suková
- Score: 5–7, 6–3, [10–5]

Events
Singles	men	women		boys	girls
Doubles	men	women	mixed	boys	girls
WC Singles	men	women	quad
WC Doubles	men	women	quad
Legends	men	women	seniors
← 2007 ·	Wimbledon Championships	· 2009 →

Jana Novotná and Helena Suková were the defending champions but did not compete together.

Novotná and Kathy Rinaldi defeated Suková and Martina Navratilova in the final, 5–7, 6–3, [10–5] to win the ladies' invitation doubles tennis title at the 2008 Wimbledon Championships.

== Draw ==
=== Key ===
- Q = Qualifier
- WC = Wild card
- LL = Lucky loser
- Alt = Alternate
- ITF = ITF entry
- PR = Protected ranking
- SR = Special ranking
- SE = Special exempt
- JE = Junior exempt
- JR = Junior Accelerator Programme entrant
- CO = College Accelerator Programme entrant
- NG = Next Gen Accelerator Program entrant
- w/o = Walkover
- r = Retired
- d = Defaulted

=== Final ===
Final
(Czech Republic) Jana Novotná (United States) Kathy Rinaldi	5	6	[10]
(United States) Martina Navratilova (Czech Republic) Helena Suková	7	3	[5]

=== Group A ===
	(Belgium) Appelmans (Australia) Mandlíková	(Canada) Bassett-Seguso (Netherlands) Bollegraf	(Czech Republic) Novotná (United States) Rinaldi	(Australia) Smylie (France) Tauziat	RR; W–L	Set; W–L	Game; W–L	Standings
(Belgium) Sabine Appelmans (Australia) Hana Mandlíková		6–7^{(4–7)}, 7–6^{(7–1)}, [9–11]	0–6, 1–6	4–6, 3–6	0–3	1–6	21–38	4
(Canada) Carling Bassett-Seguso (Netherlands) Manon Bollegraf	7–6^{(7–4)}, 6–7^{(1–7)}, [11–9]		w/o	1–6, 3–6	1–2	2–3	18–25	3
(Czech Republic) Jana Novotná (United States) Kathy Rinaldi	6–0, 6–1	w/o		6–4, 6–1	3–0	4–0	24–6	1
(Australia) Liz Smylie (France) Nathalie Tauziat	6–4, 6–3	6–1, 6–3	4–6, 1–6		2–1	4–2	29–23	2

Standings are determined by: 1. number of wins; 2. number of matches; 3. in two-players-ties, head-to-head records; 4. in three-players-ties, percentage of sets won, or of games won; 5. steering-committee decision.

=== Group B ===
	(United Kingdom) Croft (United Kingdom) Durie	(South Africa) Kloss (United States) Nideffer	(United States) Magers (Spain) Martínez	(United States) Navratilova (Czech Republic) Suková	RR; W–L	Set; W–L	Game; W–L	Standings
(United Kingdom) Annabel Croft (United Kingdom) Jo Durie		3–6, 0–6	w/o	1–6, 0–1 ret.	0–3	0–3	4–19	4
(South Africa) Ilana Kloss (United States) Rosalyn Nideffer	6–3, 6–0		3–6, 1–6	4–6, 6–4, [4–10]	1–2	3–3	26–26	3
(United States) Gretchen Magers (Spain) Conchita Martínez	w/o	6–3, 6–1		4–6, 3–6	2–1	2–2	19–16	2
(United States) Martina Navratilova (Czech Republic) Helena Suková	6–1, 1–0 ret.	6–4, 4–6, [10–4]	6–4, 6–3		3–0	5–1	30–18	1

Standings are determined by: 1. number of wins; 2. number of matches; 3. in two-players-ties, head-to-head records; 4. in three-players-ties, percentage of sets won, or of games won; 5. steering-committee decision.
