= 2008 Wimbledon Championships – Men's singles =

Tennis tournament held in 2008

Men's singles
- 2008 Wimbledon Championships

Final
- Champion: (Spain) Rafael Nadal
- Runner-up: (Switzerland) Roger Federer
- Score: 6–4, 6–4, 6–7^{(5–7)}, 6–7^{(8–10)}, 9–7

Details
- Draw: 128 (16Q / 4WC)
- Seeds: 32

Events
Singles	men	women		boys	girls
Doubles	men	women	mixed	boys	girls
WC Singles	men	women	quad
WC Doubles	men	women	quad
Legends	men	women	seniors
- Wimbledon Championships

Rafael Nadal defeated five-time defending champion Roger Federer in the final, 6–4, 6–4, 6–7^{(5–7)}, 6–7^{(8–10)}, 9–7 to win the gentlemen's singles tennis title at the 2008 Wimbledon Championships. It was his fifth major title, and his first outside of the French Open, completing the Channel Slam at 22 years, 33 days old. The final marked the third consecutive Wimbledon final between Nadal and Federer, with Federer winning the two prior encounters. It was the first time Federer lost a major final outside the French Open, and would be his only loss at Wimbledon between 2003 and 2009. Nadal's victory ended Federer's record 65-match winning streak on grass. It was the second-longest championship match in Wimbledon history with play lasting 4 hours and 48 minutes, and with two rain delays. The event stretched over seven hours ending just before nightfall, and is considered by many to be the greatest match in tennis history.

Until the 2017 Australian Open, this would be last time Novak Djokovic would fail to reach the third round of a major. He lost to Marat Safin in the second round, who would end up reaching a career-best semifinal showing at Wimbledon before losing to Federer.

== Seeds ==
1. (Switzerland) Roger Federer (final)
2. (Spain) Rafael Nadal (champion)
3. (Serbia) Novak Djokovic (second round)
4. (Russia) Nikolay Davydenko (first round)
5. (Spain) David Ferrer (third round)
6. (United States) Andy Roddick (second round)
7. (Argentina) David Nalbandian (first round)
8. (France) Richard Gasquet (fourth round)
9. (United States) James Blake (second round)
10. (Cyprus) Marcos Baghdatis (fourth round)
11. (Czech Republic) Tomáš Berdych (third round)
12. (United Kingdom) Andy Murray (quarterfinals)
13. (Switzerland) Stan Wawrinka (fourth round)
14. (France) Paul-Henri Mathieu (third round)
15. (Chile) Fernando González (second round)
16. (Czech Republic) Radek Štěpánek (third round)

17. (Russia) Mikhail Youzhny (fourth round)
18. (Croatia) Ivo Karlović (first round)
19. (Spain) Nicolás Almagro (second round)
20. (Australia) Lleyton Hewitt (fourth round)
21. (Spain) Juan Carlos Ferrero (second round, retired due to a neck injury)
22. (Spain) Fernando Verdasco (fourth round)
23. (Spain) Tommy Robredo (second round)
24. (Finland) Jarkko Nieminen (second round)
25. (Russia) Dmitry Tursunov (third round)
26. (Croatia) Ivan Ljubičić (first round)
27. (Germany) Nicolas Kiefer (third round)
28. (France) Gilles Simon (third round)
29. (Italy) Andreas Seppi (third round)
30. (France) Gaël Monfils (withdrew)
31. (Spain) Feliciano López (quarterfinals)
32. (France) Michaël Llodra (first round, retired due to a left arm injury)

Click on the seed number of a player to go to their draw section.

Gaël Monfils withdrew due to a shoulder injury. He was replaced in the draw by lucky loser Ilija Bozoljac.

== Draw ==
Key

- Q = Qualifier
- WC = Wild card
- LL = Lucky loser
- Alt = Alternate
- ITF = ITF entry
- PR = Protected ranking
- SR = Special ranking
- SE = Special exempt
- JE = Junior exempt
- JR = Junior Accelerator Programme entrant
- CO = College Accelerator Programme entrant
- NG = Next Gen Accelerator Program entrant
- w/o = Walkover
- r = Retired
- d = Defaulted

=== Finals ===
Quarterfinals
1	(Switzerland) Roger Federer	6	7	6
(Croatia) Mario Ančić	1	5	4
(Russia) Marat Safin	3	7	7^{7}	6
31	(Spain) Feliciano López	6	5	6^{1}	3
(Germany) Rainer Schüttler	6	5	7^{8}	6^{7}	8
(France) Arnaud Clément	3	7	6^{6}	7^{9}	6
12	(United Kingdom) Andy Murray	3	2	4
2	(Spain) Rafael Nadal	6	6	6

Semifinals
1	(Switzerland) Roger Federer	6	7^{7}	6
(Russia) Marat Safin	3	6^{3}	4
(Germany) Rainer Schüttler	1	6^{3}	4
2	(Spain) Rafael Nadal	6	7^{7}	6

Final
1	(Switzerland) Roger Federer	4	4	7^{7}	7^{10}	7
2	(Spain) Rafael Nadal	6	6	6^{5}	6^{8}	9

=== Top half ===
==== Section 1 ====
First round
1	(Switzerland) R Federer	6	6	6
PR	(Slovakia) D Hrbatý	3	2	2
(Sweden) R Söderling	7	0	6	6
Q	(United States) K Kim	5	6	3	4
(France) M Gicquel	4	7	0
(Japan) K Nishikori	6	5	0^{r}
(Australia) C Guccione	6	4	4	3
LL	(Serbia) I Bozoljac	3	6	6	6
20	(Australia) L Hewitt	6^{4}	6	6	6^{1}	6
(Netherlands) R Haase	7^{7}	3	3	7^{7}	2
(Spain) A Montañés	6	7^{7}	6
(Argentina) C Berlocq	3	6^{2}	4
WC	(United Kingdom) A Bogdanovic	6^{4}	6	3	6^{4}
(Italy) S Bolelli	7^{7}	4	6	7^{7}
(United States) R Ginepri	6^{3}	5	5
15	(Chile) F González	7^{7}	7	7

Second round
1	(Switzerland) R Federer	6	6	7^{7}
(Sweden) R Söderling	3	4	6^{3}
(France) M Gicquel	4	5	7^{7}	7^{7}	6
LL	(Serbia) I Bozoljac	6	7	6^{1}	6^{0}	3
20	(Australia) L Hewitt	7^{7}	6	6
(Spain) A Montañés	6^{4}	0	2
(Italy) S Bolelli	7^{10}	7^{9}	3	7^{7}
15	(Chile) F González	6^{8}	6^{7}	6	6^{4}

Third round
1	(Switzerland) R Federer	6	6	6
(France) M Gicquel	3	3	1
20	(Australia) L Hewitt	6	6	7^{7}
(Italy) S Bolelli	1	3	6^{2}

Fourth round
1	(Switzerland) R Federer	7^{9}	6	6
20	(Australia) L Hewitt	6^{7}	2	4

==== Section 2 ====
First round
11	(Czech Republic) T Berdych	4	6	6	3	7
(Russia) E Korolev	6	1	4	6	5
(Romania) V Hănescu	6	6^{2}	6	6
(Colombia) A Falla	3	7^{7}	0	4
(Israel) D Sela	4	5	4
(Belgium) O Rochus	6	7	6
(Germany) P Kohlschreiber	4	3	2
22	(Spain) F Verdasco	6	6	6
32	(France) M Llodra	4	6^{7}	0^{r}
(Croatia) M Ančić	6	7^{9}	2
(South Korea) H-t Lee	7^{7}	1	4	0^{r}
Q	(Germany) P Petzschner	6^{4}	6	6	0
(Russia) I Andreev	6^{6}	7^{7}	6	6
(Czech Republic) J Vaněk	7^{8}	6^{2}	2	2
Q	(Ukraine) S Stakhovsky	6^{6}	3	3^{r}
5	(Spain) D Ferrer	7^{8}	6	1

Second round
11	(Czech Republic) T Berdych	6^{5}	7^{8}	6	6
(Romania) V Hănescu	7^{7}	6^{6}	1	2
(Belgium) O Rochus	6^{4}	7^{7}	1	1
22	(Spain) F Verdasco	7^{7}	6^{5}	6	6
(Croatia) M Ančić	6	6	6^{1}	4	6
Q	(Germany) P Petzschner	1	4	7^{7}	6	3
(Russia) I Andreev	6	3	4	2
5	(Spain) D Ferrer	3	6	6	6

Third round
11	(Czech Republic) T Berdych	4	4	0
22	(Spain) F Verdasco	6	6	6
(Croatia) M Ančić	6	6	6^{5}	7^{7}
5	(Spain) D Ferrer	4	4	7^{7}	6^{3}

Fourth round
22	(Spain) F Verdasco	6	6	3	4	11
(Croatia) M Ančić	3	4	6	6	13

==== Section 3 ====
First round
3	(Serbia) N Djokovic	7	2	6	6
(Germany) M Berrer	5	6	3	0
(Russia) M Safin	6	6	7^{7}
(Italy) F Fognini	1	2	6^{3}
(France) F Serra	6	6	6^{3}	6
(Chinese Taipei) Y-h Lu	4	4	7^{7}	3
LL	(Germany) T Kamke	7	3	2	4
29	(Italy) A Seppi	5	6	6	6
21	(Spain) JC Ferrero	2	6	6	6
(United States) S Querrey	6	4	4	4
Q	(Austria) A Peya	3	4	4
(Germany) M Zverev	6	6	6
(Argentina) JM del Potro	6	6	6
Q	(Czech Republic) P Šnobel	4	2	3
(Brazil) M Daniel	3	2	5
13	(Switzerland) S Wawrinka	6	6	7

Second round
3	(Serbia) N Djokovic	4	6^{3}	2
(Russia) M Safin	6	7^{7}	6
(France) F Serra	3	7^{7}	2	7^{7}	4
29	(Italy) A Seppi	6	6^{4}	6	6^{5}	6
21	(Spain) JC Ferrero	4	4	1^{r}
(Germany) M Zverev	6	6	2
(Argentina) JM del Potro	6^{5}	3	5
13	(Switzerland) S Wawrinka	7^{7}	6	7

Third round
(Russia) M Safin	7^{7}	3	7^{7}	6
29	(Italy) A Seppi	6^{5}	6	6^{3}	4
(Germany) M Zverev	5	1	0^{r}
13	(Switzerland) S Wawrinka	7	6	0

Fourth round
(Russia) M Safin	6	6	5	6
13	(Switzerland) S Wawrinka	4	3	7	1

==== Section 4 ====
First round
10	(Cyprus) M Baghdatis	6	6	6^{5}	6
(Belgium) S Darcis	3	2	7^{7}	3
(Sweden) T Johansson	6^{8}	6^{5}	6	6	6
(United States) V Spadea	7^{10}	7^{7}	3	4	3
(Brazil) T Bellucci	7^{7}	7^{7}	3	6
(Russia) I Kunitsyn	6^{5}	6^{5}	6	2
Q	(Germany) S Stadler	4	7^{7}	6	7
18	(Croatia) I Karlović	6	6^{4}	3	5
31	(Spain) F López	7^{7}	3	6	6
(Argentina) B Dabul	6^{1}	6	3	4
(Croatia) R Karanušić	7^{7}	6	6
(Peru) L Horna	6^{4}	3	1
(Italy) F Volandri	2	2	0^{r}
(United States) B Reynolds	6	6	0
(Canada) F Dancevic	6	6	6
7	(Argentina) D Nalbandian	4	2	4

Second round
10	(Cyprus) M Baghdatis	6	6	6
(Sweden) T Johansson	4	4	4
(Brazil) T Bellucci	6	3	1	7^{7}	6
Q	(Germany) S Stadler	3	6	6	6^{5}	8
31	(Spain) F López	6	6	6
(Croatia) R Karanušić	3	3	4
(United States) B Reynolds	4	7^{12}	6	6
(Canada) F Dancevic	6	6^{10}	4	4

Third round
10	(Cyprus) M Baghdatis	7^{7}	6	6
Q	(Germany) S Stadler	6^{2}	4	2
31	(Spain) F López	6	7	4	6
(United States) B Reynolds	4	5	6	4

Fourth round
10	(Cyprus) M Baghdatis	7	2	6	6^{4}	6
31	(Spain) F López	5	6	3	7^{7}	8

=== Bottom half ===
==== Section 5 ====
First round
6	(United States) A Roddick	7	6	7^{7}
(Argentina) E Schwank	5	4	6^{0}
(Serbia) J Tipsarević	7^{7}	6	6
(France) T Ascione	6^{4}	4	2
(Serbia) B Pašanski	3	6^{6}	4
Q	(United Kingdom) C Eaton	6	7^{8}	6
(France) N Mahut	4	7^{10}	6^{7}	6	5
25	(Russia) D Tursunov	6	6^{8}	7^{9}	3	7
19	(Spain) N Almagro	4	6	7	6
(Spain) M Granollers	6	3	5	2
(Spain) G García López	7	6	6
Q	(South Africa) I van der Merwe	5	2	2
(Spain) S Ventura Bertomeu	3	2	4
(Germany) R Schüttler	6	6	6
Q	(Belgium) C Rochus	6	3	1	4
9	(United States) J Blake	3	6	6	6

Second round
6	(United States) A Roddick	7^{7}	5	4	6^{4}
(Serbia) J Tipsarević	6^{5}	7	6	7^{7}
Q	(United Kingdom) C Eaton	6^{2}	2	4
25	(Russia) D Tursunov	7^{7}	6	6
19	(Spain) N Almagro	3	6	7	1	2
(Spain) G García López	6	3	5	6	6
(Germany) R Schüttler	6	6^{8}	4	6	6
9	(United States) J Blake	3	7^{10}	6	4	4

Third round
(Serbia) J Tipsarević	7^{7}	7^{7}	6
25	(Russia) D Tursunov	6^{1}	6^{3}	3
(Spain) G García López	2	3	4
(Germany) R Schüttler	6	6	6

Fourth round
(Serbia) J Tipsarević	4	6	4	6^{4}
(Germany) R Schüttler	6	3	6	7^{7}

==== Section 6 ====
First round
14	(France) P-H Mathieu	3	6	6	6
(Spain) Ó Hernández	6	2	0	2
WC	(France) J Chardy	7	6^{1}	4	6	6
Q	(Portugal) F Gil	5	7^{7}	6	4	3
Q	(France) É Roger-Vasselin	4	3	6^{4}
(Croatia) M Čilić	6	6	7^{7}
(United States) W Odesnik	3	0^{r}
24	(Finland) J Nieminen	6	0
26	(Croatia) I Ljubičić	4	6^{7}	6	6	3
(Austria) J Melzer	6	7^{9}	4	2	6
Q	(United States) J Levine	4	6	6	6
(United States) D Young	6	2	3	4
(Sweden) J Björkman	6	6^{2}	4	6^{4}
(France) A Clément	4	7^{7}	6	7^{7}
(Germany) B Becker	6	6	6
4	(Russia) N Davydenko	4	4	4

Second round
14	(France) P-H Mathieu	6	7	7^{7}
WC	(France) J Chardy	3	5	6^{1}
(Croatia) M Čilić	6	3	6	6^{6}	7
24	(Finland) J Nieminen	4	6	3	7^{8}	5
(Austria) J Melzer	4	6	3	6	6
Q	(United States) J Levine	6	2	6	4	1
(France) A Clément	7^{9}	7^{7}	6
(Germany) B Becker	6^{7}	6^{3}	3

Third round
14	(France) P-H Mathieu	7^{7}	3	4	6^{7}
(Croatia) M Čilić	6^{5}	6	6	7^{9}
(Austria) J Melzer	6	3	4	4
(France) A Clément	4	6	6	6

Fourth round
(Croatia) M Čilić	3	5	2
(France) A Clément	6	7	6

==== Section 7 ====
First round
8	(France) R Gasquet	6	6	6
(United States) M Fish	3	4	2
(France) S Grosjean	6	7	6
(Italy) P Starace	2	5	1
(South Africa) K Anderson	6	5	5	1
(Argentina) A Calleri	4	7	7	6
Q	(Poland) D Olejniczak	3	4	2
28	(France) G Simon	6	6	6
23	(Spain) T Robredo	6	6	6^{4}	6
(Belgium) K Vliegen	1	3	7^{7}	4
(Argentina) G Cañas	6	4	4	4
(Germany) T Haas	3	6	6	6
WC	(Belgium) X Malisse	6	6	6
(Germany) D Gremelmayr	3	4	2
(France) F Santoro	3	4	6^{5}
12	(United Kingdom) A Murray	6	6	7^{7}

Second round
8	(France) R Gasquet	6	6	0
(France) S Grosjean	2	2	0^{r}
(Argentina) A Calleri	7	2	3	4
28	(France) G Simon	5	6	6	6
23	(Spain) T Robredo	4	4	3
(Germany) T Haas	6	6	6
WC	(Belgium) X Malisse	4	2	2
12	(United Kingdom) A Murray	6	6	6

Third round
8	(France) R Gasquet	6	6	6^{3}	6
28	(France) G Simon	3	3	7^{7}	3
(Germany) T Haas	4	7^{7}	3	2
12	(United Kingdom) A Murray	6	6^{4}	6	6

Fourth round
8	(France) R Gasquet	7	6	6^{3}	2	4
12	(United Kingdom) A Murray	5	3	7^{7}	6	6

==== Section 8 ====
First round
16	(Czech Republic) R Štěpánek	6	7	6
Q	(Czech Republic) J Hernych	3	5	0
(Serbia) V Troicki	6	4
(Ecuador) N Lapentti	3	0^{r}
WC	(United Kingdom) J Baker	4	2	3
Q	(Italy) S Galvani	6	6	6
(Argentina) S Roitman	1	4	0
17	(Russia) M Youzhny	6	6	6
27	(Germany) N Kiefer	6	7	6
(France) J Benneteau	1	5	3
(Argentina) M Vassallo Argüello	6	2	2	6	6
(Czech Republic) I Minář	4	6	6	2	2
(United States) J Isner	5	5	7^{7}	6^{6}
(Latvia) E Gulbis	7	7	6^{3}	7^{8}
Q	(Germany) A Beck	4	4	6^{0}
2	(Spain) R Nadal	6	6	7^{7}

Second round
16	(Czech Republic) R Štěpánek	6^{1}	6^{3}	6	6	6
(Serbia) V Troicki	7^{7}	7^{7}	3	1	2
Q	(Italy) S Galvani	6	4	3	6	3
17	(Russia) M Youzhny	4	6	6	3	6
27	(Germany) N Kiefer	6	6	6
(Argentina) M Vassallo Argüello	0	3	1
(Latvia) E Gulbis	7	2	6^{2}	3
2	(Spain) R Nadal	5	6	7^{7}	6

Third round
16	(Czech Republic) R Štěpánek	5	7^{7}	4	7^{7}	3
17	(Russia) M Youzhny	7	6^{5}	6	6^{4}	6
27	(Germany) N Kiefer	6^{3}	2	3
2	(Spain) R Nadal	7^{7}	6	6

Fourth round
17	(Russia) M Youzhny	3	3	1
2	(Spain) R Nadal	6	6	6

Preceded by 2008 French Open – Men's singles	Grand Slam men's singles	Succeeded by 2008 US Open – Men's singles
