= 2008 Wimbledon Championships – Senior gentlemen's invitation doubles =

Senior gentlemen's invitation doubles
- 2008 Wimbledon Championships

Final
- Champions: (United States) Ken Flach (United States) Robert Seguso
- Runners-up: (United Kingdom) Jeremy Bates (Sweden) Anders Järryd
- Score: 7–6^{(7–1)}, 6–7^{(5–7)}, [10–7]

Events
Singles	men	women		boys	girls
Doubles	men	women	mixed	boys	girls
WC Singles	men	women	quad
WC Doubles	men	women	quad
Legends	men	women	seniors
← 2007 ·	Wimbledon Championships	· 2009 →

Ken Flach and Robert Seguso defeated the defending champions Jeremy Bates and Anders Järryd in the final, 7–6^{(7–1)}, 6–7^{(5–7)}, [10–7] to win the senior gentlemen's invitation doubles tennis title at the 2008 Wimbledon Championships.

== Draw ==
=== Key ===
- Q = Qualifier
- WC = Wild card
- LL = Lucky loser
- Alt = Alternate
- ITF = ITF entry
- PR = Protected ranking
- SR = Special ranking
- SE = Special exempt
- JE = Junior exempt
- JR = Junior Accelerator Programme entrant
- CO = College Accelerator Programme entrant
- NG = Next Gen Accelerator Program entrant
- w/o = Walkover
- r = Retired
- d = Defaulted

=== Final ===
Final
(United Kingdom) Jeremy Bates (Sweden) Anders Järryd	6^{1}	7^{7}	[7]
(United States) Ken Flach (United States) Robert Seguso	7^{7}	6^{5}	[10]

=== Group A ===
	(India) Amritraj (United States) Mayer	(Iran) Bahrami (France) Leconte	(United Kingdom) Bates (Sweden) Järryd	(Switzerland) Günthardt (Hungary) Taróczy	RR; W–L	Set; W–L	Game; W–L	Standings
(India) Vijay Amritraj (United States) Gene Mayer		7–6^{(7–4)}, 4–6, [10–8]	6–7^{(4–7)}, 6–7^{(2–7)}	2–1 ret.	2–1	2–3	26–27	2
(Iran) Mansour Bahrami (France) Henri Leconte	6–7^{(4–7)}, 6–4, [8–10]		4–6, 6–4, [7–10]	6–4, 7–6^{(7–4)}	1–2	3–3	35–33	3
(United Kingdom) Jeremy Bates (Sweden) Anders Järryd	7–6^{(7–4)}, 7–6^{(7–2)}	6–4, 4–6, [10–7]		6–3, 6–2	3–0	6–1	37–27	1
(Switzerland) Heinz Günthardt (Hungary) Balázs Taróczy	1–2 ret.	4–6, 6–7^{(4–7)}	3–6, 2–6		0–3	0–4	16–27	4

Standings are determined by: 1. number of wins; 2. number of matches; 3. in two-players-ties, head-to-head records; 4. in three-players-ties, percentage of sets won, or of games won; 5. steering-committee decision.

=== Group B ===
	(United States) Curren (Australia) Fitzgerald	(United States) Flach (United States) Seguso	(United States) Fleming (Argentina) Vilas	(Australia) McNamara (Australia) McNamee	RR; W–L	Set; W–L	Game; W–L	Standings
(United States) Kevin Curren (Australia) John Fitzgerald		w/o	6–3, 5–5 ret.	w/o	0–3	0–1	11–8	4
(United States) Ken Flach (United States) Robert Seguso	w/o		6–0, 6–1	4–6, 6–3, [10–7]	3–0	4–1	23–10	1
(United States) Peter Fleming (Argentina) Guillermo Vilas	3–6, 5–5 ret.	0–6, 1–6		1–6, 3–6	1–2	0–5	13–35	3
(Australia) Peter McNamara (Australia) Paul McNamee	w/o	6–4, 3–6, [7–10]	6–1, 6–3		2–1	3–3	21–15	2

Standings are determined by: 1. number of wins; 2. number of matches; 3. in two-players-ties, head-to-head records; 4. in three-players-ties, percentage of sets won, or of games won; 5. steering-committee decision.
