= 2008 Wimbledon Championships – Men's doubles =

Men's doubles
- 2008 Wimbledon Championships

Final
- Champions: (Canada) Daniel Nestor (Serbia) Nenad Zimonjić
- Runners-up: (Sweden) Jonas Björkman (Zimbabwe) Kevin Ullyett
- Score: 7–6^{(14–12)}, 6–7^{(3–7)}, 6–3, 6–3

Details
- Draw: 64 (4 Q / 5 WC )
- Seeds: 16

Events
Singles	men	women		boys	girls
Doubles	men	women	mixed	boys	girls
WC Singles	men	women	quad
WC Doubles	men	women	quad
Legends	men	women	seniors
← 2007 ·	Wimbledon Championships	· 2009 →

Daniel Nestor and Nenad Zimonjić defeated Jonas Björkman and Kevin Ullyett in the final, 7–6^{(14–12)}, 6–7^{(3–7)}, 6–3, 6–3, to win the gentlemen's doubles title at the 2008 Wimbledon Championships. With the win, Nestor completed the career Grand Slam and the career Super Slam.

Arnaud Clément and Michaël Llodra were the reigning champions, but withdrew due to a left arm injury for Llodra.

== Seeds ==
1. (United States) Bob Bryan / (United States) Mike Bryan (semifinals)
2. (Canada) Daniel Nestor / (Serbia) Nenad Zimonjić (champions)
3. (Israel) Jonathan Erlich / (Israel) Andy Ram (quarterfinals)
4. (India) Mahesh Bhupathi / (The Bahamas) Mark Knowles (first round)
5. (Sweden) Simon Aspelin / (Austria) Julian Knowle (first round)
6. (Czech Republic) Martin Damm / (Czech Republic) Pavel Vízner (first round)
7. (France) Arnaud Clément / (France) Michaël Llodra (withdrew)
8. (Sweden) Jonas Björkman / (Zimbabwe) Kevin Ullyett (final)
9. (Czech Republic) Lukáš Dlouhý / (India) Leander Paes (semifinals)
10. (Poland) Mariusz Fyrstenberg / (Poland) Marcin Matkowski (first round)
11. (South Africa) Jeff Coetzee / (South Africa) Wesley Moodie (second round)
12. (Brazil) Marcelo Melo / (Brazil) André Sá (third round, withdrew)
13. (Czech Republic) František Čermák / (Australia) Jordan Kerr (third round)
14. (Belarus) Max Mirnyi / (United Kingdom) Jamie Murray (third round)
15. (Germany) Christopher Kas / (Netherlands) Rogier Wassen (third round)
16. (France) Julien Benneteau / (France) Nicolas Mahut (third round)

Click on the seed number of a player to go to their draw section.

Arnaud Clément and Michaël Llodra withdrew due to a left arm injury for Llodra. They were replaced in the draw by lucky losers Hugo Armando and Jesse Levine.

== Draw ==
=== Key ===
- Q = Qualifier
- WC = Wild card
- LL = Lucky loser
- Alt = Alternate
- ITF = ITF entry
- PR = Protected ranking
- SR = Special ranking
- SE = Special exempt
- JE = Junior exempt
- JR = Junior Accelerator Programme entrant
- CO = College Accelerator Programme entrant
- NG = Next Gen Accelerator Program entrant
- w/o = Walkover
- r = Retired
- d = Defaulted

=== Finals ===
Quarterfinals
1	(United States) Bob Bryan (United States) Mike Bryan	7^{7}	6	6
(Spain) Marcel Granollers (Spain) Santiago Ventura Bertomeu	6^{3}	2	0
(Germany) Philipp Petzschner (Austria) Alexander Peya	6^{5}	6	3	7^{7}	2
8	(Sweden) Jonas Björkman (Zimbabwe) Kevin Ullyett	7^{7}	4	6	6^{5}	6
9	(Czech Republic) Lukáš Dlouhý (India) Leander Paes	6	6	6
3	(Israel) Jonathan Erlich (Israel) Andy Ram	3	3	3
(South Africa) Kevin Anderson (Sweden) Robert Lindstedt	6^{5}	4	7^{7}	3
2	(Canada) Daniel Nestor (Serbia) Nenad Zimonjić	7^{7}	6	6^{5}	6

Semifinals
1	(United States) Bob Bryan (United States) Mike Bryan	6^{3}	7	6^{5}	6^{9}
8	(Sweden) Jonas Björkman (Zimbabwe) Kevin Ullyett	7^{7}	5	7^{7}	7^{11}
9	(Czech Republic) Lukáš Dlouhý (India) Leander Paes	6^{4}	6	1	6	6
2	(Canada) Daniel Nestor (Serbia) Nenad Zimonjić	7^{7}	4	6	4	8

Final
8	(Sweden) Jonas Björkman (Zimbabwe) Kevin Ullyett	6^{12}	7^{7}	3	3
2	(Canada) Daniel Nestor (Serbia) Nenad Zimonjić	7^{14}	6^{3}	6	6

=== Top half ===
==== Section 1 ====
First round
1	(United States) B Bryan (United States) M Bryan	7	6	6
WC	(United Kingdom) C Eaton (United Kingdom) A Slabinsky	5	1	4
(Czech Republic) J Levinský (Czech Republic) D Škoch	3	2	2
(Russia) I Kunitsyn (Russia) D Tursunov	6	6	6
(Argentina) E Schwank (Argentina) C Berlocq	6	4	6	6
(Argentina) G Cañas (Argentina) M García	1	6	4	4
WC	(United Kingdom) R Bloomfield (United Kingdom) K Skupski	4	7	4	4
13	(Czech Republic) F Čermák (Australia) J Kerr	6	5	6	6
10	(Poland) M Fyrstenberg (Poland) M Matkowski	3	5	4
(India) R Bopanna (Pakistan) A-u-H Qureshi	6	7	6
(Thailand) Sa Ratiwatana (Thailand) So Ratiwatana	6^{2}	2	6^{6}
(Spain) M Granollers (Spain) S Ventura Bertomeu	7^{7}	6	7^{8}
(Brazil) T Bellucci (Brazil) M Daniel	5	4	3
Q	(Czech Republic) P Pála (Slovakia) I Zelenay	7	6	6
Q	(Portugal) F Gil (Belgium) D Norman	7^{7}	7^{7}	6
LL	(United States) H Armando (United States) J Levine	6^{3}	6^{5}	3

Second round
1	(United States) B Bryan (United States) M Bryan	6	6	6
(Russia) I Kunitsyn (Russia) D Tursunov	2	2	4
(Argentina) E Schwank (Argentina) C Berlocq	3	4	6^{5}
13	(Czech Republic) F Čermák (Australia) J Kerr	6	6	7^{7}
(India) R Bopanna (Pakistan) A-u-H Qureshi	2	4	2
(Spain) M Granollers (Spain) S Ventura Bertomeu	6	6	6
Q	(Czech Republic) P Pála (Slovakia) I Zelenay	4	2	6	7^{7}	6
Q	(Portugal) F Gil (Belgium) D Norman	6	6	1	6^{4}	1

Third round
1	(United States) B Bryan (United States) M Bryan	6^{10}	6	6	6
13	(Czech Republic) F Čermák (Australia) J Kerr	7^{12}	4	4	2
(Spain) M Granollers (Spain) S Ventura Bertomeu	7	6	6
Q	(Czech Republic) P Pála (Slovakia) I Zelenay	5	2	4

Quarterfinals
1	(United States) B Bryan (United States) M Bryan	7^{7}	6	6
(Spain) M Granollers (Spain) S Ventura Bertomeu	6^{3}	2	0

==== Section 2 ====
First round
4	(India) M Bhupathi (The Bahamas) M Knowles	5	2	6^{4}
(Germany) P Petzschner (Austria) A Peya	7	6	7^{7}
(Serbia) J Tipsarević (Serbia) V Troicki	6	6	6
(Israel) H Levy (United States) J Thomas	3	1	3
(France) J Chardy (France) F Serra	1	2	3
(Argentina) L Arnold Ker (Peru) L Horna	6	6	6
(Spain) Ó Hernández (Spain) A Montañés	5	3	2
15	(Germany) C Kas (Netherlands) R Wassen	7	6	6
11	(South Africa) J Coetzee (South Africa) W Moodie	6	1	6	6
(Italy) S Bolelli (Italy) A Seppi	1	6	3	2
(Spain) F López (Spain) F Verdasco	6	6	6
(Czech Republic) T Cibulec (Czech Republic) I Minář	4	4	4
(Netherlands) R Haase (United States) S Querrey	2	6	5	6^{2}
(Italy) F Cipolla (Germany) D Gremelmayr	6	2	7	7^{7}
(Australia) P Hanley (Australia) T Perry	4	4	5
8	(Sweden) J Björkman (Zimbabwe) K Ullyett	6	6	7

Second round
(Germany) P Petzschner (Austria) A Peya	6	6	6
(Serbia) J Tipsarević (Serbia) V Troicki	4	4	3
(Argentina) L Arnold Ker (Peru) L Horna	w/o
15	(Germany) C Kas (Netherlands) R Wassen
11	(South Africa) J Coetzee (South Africa) W Moodie	6^{2}	2	6^{3}
(Spain) F López (Spain) F Verdasco	7^{7}	6	7^{7}
(Italy) F Cipolla (Germany) D Gremelmayr	4	6^{2}	4
8	(Sweden) J Björkman (Zimbabwe) K Ullyett	6	7^{7}	6

Third round
(Germany) P Petzschner (Austria) A Peya	6^{5}	7^{9}	6	6
15	(Germany) C Kas (Netherlands) R Wassen	7^{7}	6^{7}	2	4
(Spain) F López (Spain) F Verdasco	w/o
8	(Sweden) J Björkman (Zimbabwe) K Ullyett

Quarterfinals
(Germany) P Petzschner (Austria) A Peya	6^{5}	6	3	7^{7}	2
8	(Sweden) J Björkman (Zimbabwe) K Ullyett	7^{7}	4	6	6^{5}	6

=== Bottom half ===
==== Section 3 ====
First round
6	(Czech Republic) M Damm (Czech Republic) P Vízner	4	6^{6}	6	4
(United States) T Parrott (Slovakia) F Polášek	6	7^{8}	2	6
WC	(United Kingdom) N Bamford (United Kingdom) J Goodall	3	6^{5}	2
(South Africa) R de Voest (Poland) L Kubot	6	7^{7}	6
(United States) E Butorac (Australia) A Fisher	5	6	6	6^{4}	7
(Switzerland) Y Allegro (Argentina) S Prieto	7	4	4	7^{7}	5
WC	(United Kingdom) J Auckland (United Kingdom) J Delgado	6	0	3	6	3
9	(Czech Republic) L Dlouhý (India) L Paes	4	6	6	4	6
16	(France) J Benneteau (France) N Mahut	6	7^{7}	6
(Argentina) JM del Potro (Slovakia) D Hrbatý	0	6^{3}	2
(Austria) O Marach (Slovakia) M Mertiňák	2	5	5
(Sweden) T Johansson (Austria) J Melzer	6	7	7
Q	(United States) KJ Hippensteel (United States) T Phillips	3	7^{7}	5	2
(Australia) S Huss (United Kingdom) R Hutchins	6	6^{5}	7	6
(United States) S Lipsky (United States) D Martin	7	6	3	3	9
3	(Israel) J Erlich (Israel) A Ram	5	4	6	6	11

Second round
(United States) T Parrott (Slovakia) F Polášek	6	3	7^{7}	6
(South Africa) R de Voest (Poland) L Kubot	4	6	6^{5}	4
(United States) E Butorac (Australia) A Fisher	3	6^{3}	3
9	(Czech Republic) L Dlouhý (India) L Paes	6	7^{7}	6
16	(France) J Benneteau (France) N Mahut	7^{7}	6	6
(Sweden) T Johansson (Austria) J Melzer	6^{2}	4	3
(Australia) S Huss (United Kingdom) R Hutchins	7^{7}	4	6	3	4
3	(Israel) J Erlich (Israel) A Ram	6^{3}	6	3	6	6

Third round
(United States) T Parrott (Slovakia) F Polášek	6^{2}	6^{6}	4
9	(Czech Republic) L Dlouhý (India) L Paes	7^{7}	7^{8}	6
16	(France) J Benneteau (France) N Mahut	6	7^{7}	6^{5}	3	4
3	(Israel) J Erlich (Israel) A Ram	4	6^{4}	7^{7}	6	6

Quarterfinals
9	(Czech Republic) L Dlouhý (India) L Paes	6	6	6
3	(Israel) J Erlich (Israel) A Ram	3	3	3

==== Section 4 ====
First round
5	(Sweden) S Aspelin (Austria) J Knowle	4	6	6^{6}	6^{4}
(South Africa) K Anderson (Sweden) R Lindstedt	6	4	7^{8}	7^{7}
(Belgium) S Darcis (Belgium) K Vliegen	4	2	6^{0}
(Germany) M Kohlmann (Switzerland) J-C Scherrer	6	6	7^{7}
LL	(Sweden) J Brunström (Australia) A Feeney	6	3	4	6	7
(South Africa) C Haggard (Croatia) L Zovko	2	6	6	3	5
LL	(Russia) M Elgin (Russia) A Kudryavtsev	3	6	6	4	1
12	(Brazil) M Melo (Brazil) A Sá	6	3	4	6	6
14	(Belarus) M Mirnyi (United Kingdom) J Murray	7^{7}	7^{7}	6
(France) M Gicquel (France) F Santoro	6^{4}	6^{5}	3
(Brazil) B Soares (Serbia) D Vemić	3	6	5	6^{3}
(United States) J Cerretani (Romania) V Hănescu	6	3	7	7^{7}
(United States) R Ram (United States) B Reynolds	6	7^{7}	6
Q	(United States) A Delic (United States) B Evans	2	6^{4}	3
WC	(United Kingdom) A Bogdanovic (United Kingdom) J Marray	4	6^{4}	1
2	(Canada) D Nestor (Serbia) N Zimonjić	6	7^{7}	6

Second round
(South Africa) K Anderson (Sweden) R Lindstedt	7^{7}	6	6
(Germany) M Kohlmann (Switzerland) J-C Scherrer	6^{4}	4	2
LL	(Sweden) J Brunström (Australia) A Feeney	1	2	6	4
12	(Brazil) M Melo (Brazil) A Sá	6	6	4	6
14	(Belarus) M Mirnyi (United Kingdom) J Murray	6	6	7^{7}
(United States) J Cerretani (Romania) V Hănescu	4	4	6^{0}
(United States) R Ram (United States) B Reynolds	1	6^{6}	6	6^{1}
2	(Canada) D Nestor (Serbia) N Zimonjić	6	7^{8}	2	7^{7}

Third round
(South Africa) K Anderson (Sweden) R Lindstedt
12	(Brazil) M Melo (Brazil) A Sá	w/o
14	(Belarus) M Mirnyi (United Kingdom) J Murray	2	5	3
2	(Canada) D Nestor (Serbia) N Zimonjić	6	7	6

Quarterfinals
(South Africa) K Anderson (Sweden) R Lindstedt	6^{5}	4	7^{7}	3
2	(Canada) D Nestor (Serbia) N Zimonjić	7^{7}	6	6^{5}	6
