= 2008 Wimbledon Championships – Girls' singles =

Girls' singles
- 2008 Wimbledon Championships

Final
- Champion: (United Kingdom) Laura Robson
- Runner-up: (Thailand) Noppawan Lertcheewakarn
- Score: 6–3, 3–6, 6–1

Details
- Draw: 64 (8 Q / 8 WC )
- Seeds: 16

Events
Singles	men	women		boys	girls
Doubles	men	women	mixed	boys	girls
WC Singles	men	women	quad
WC Doubles	men	women	quad
Legends	men	women	seniors
← 2007 ·	Wimbledon Championships	· 2009 →

Urszula Radwańska was the defending champion, but did not compete in the Juniors this year.

Laura Robson defeated Noppawan Lertcheewakarn in the final, 6–3, 3–6, 6–1 to win the girls' singles tennis title at the 2008 Wimbledon Championships. With this victory Robson became only the second British player in the open era to win a junior title at Wimbledon, following Annabel Croft's victory in 1984.

== Seeds ==
1. (United States) Melanie Oudin (second round)
2. (Netherlands) Arantxa Rus (quarterfinals)
3. (Thailand) Noppawan Lertcheewakarn (final)
4. (Romania) Elena Bogdan (first round)
5. (Slovenia) Polona Hercog (quarterfinals)
6. (Australia) Jessica Moore (third round)
7. (Romania) Ana Bogdan (first round)
8. (Japan) Kurumi Nara (first round)
9. (Serbia) Bojana Jovanovski (quarterfinals)
10. (Australia) Johanna Konta (third round)
11. (Russia) Ksenia Lykina (first round)
12. (Austria) Nikola Hofmanova (third round)
13. (Indonesia) Jessy Rompies (first round)
14. (Russia) Elena Chernyakova (second round)
15. (Germany) Linda Berlinecke (second round)
16. (Poland) Katarzyna Piter (second round)

Click on the seed number of a player to go to their draw section.

== Draw ==
=== Key ===
- Q = Qualifier
- WC = Wild card
- LL = Lucky loser
- Alt = Alternate
- ITF = ITF entry
- PR = Protected ranking
- SR = Special ranking
- SE = Special exempt
- JE = Junior exempt
- JR = Junior Accelerator Programme entrant
- CO = College Accelerator Programme entrant
- NG = Next Gen Accelerator Program entrant
- w/o = Walkover
- r = Retired
- d = Defaulted

=== Finals ===
Quarterfinals
(United Kingdom) Laura Robson	7	6
9	(Serbia) Bojana Jovanovski	5	4
Q	(Slovakia) Romana Tabaková	6	6
5	(Slovenia) Polona Hercog	4	1
WC	(United Kingdom) Naomi Broady	7^{7}	3	4
3	(Thailand) Noppawan Lertcheewakarn	6^{6}	6	6
(Belgium) Tamaryn Hendler	7^{7}	6
2	(Netherlands) Arantxa Rus	6^{4}	3

Semifinals
(United Kingdom) Laura Robson	6	7
Q	(Slovakia) Romana Tabaková	2	5
3	(Thailand) Noppawan Lertcheewakarn	7^{7}	6
(Belgium) Tamaryn Hendler	6^{2}	3

Final
(United Kingdom) Laura Robson	6	3	6
3	(Thailand) Noppawan Lertcheewakarn	3	6	1

=== Top half ===
==== Section 1 ====
First round
1	(United States) Melanie Oudin	6	6
Q	(Japan) Sachie Ishizu	1	2
(United Kingdom) Laura Robson	6	6
LL	(United States) Alexa Guarachi	0	4
(Netherlands) Lesley Kerkhove	3	6	6
(Canada) Rebecca Marino	6	3	4
(Hungary) Réka Luca Jani	4	3
15	(Germany) Linda Berlinecke	6	6
9	(Serbia) Bojana Jovanovski	6	6
(Italy) Anastasia Grymalska	0	1
WC	(United Kingdom) Amanda Cunningham	5	2
Q	(Czech Republic) Martina Borecká	7	6
(Australia) Isabella Holland	7	4	8
WC	(Poland) Aleksandra Grela	5	6	6
(Russia) Marta Sirotkina	7	3	6
8	(Japan) Kurumi Nara	5	6	0

Second round
1	(United States) M Oudin	1	3
(United Kingdom) L Robson	6	6
(Netherlands) L Kerkhove	5	6	6
15	(Germany) L Berlinecke	7	3	2
9	(Serbia) B Jovanovski	6	6
Q	(Czech Republic) M Borecká	3	4
(Australia) I Holland	6	4	6
(Russia) M Sirotkina	3	6	3

Third round
(United Kingdom) L Robson	7^{8}	7
(Netherlands) L Kerkhove	6^{6}	5
9	(Serbia) B Jovanovski	7	6
(Australia) I Holland	5	2

Quarterfinals
(United Kingdom) L Robson	7	6
9	(Serbia) B Jovanovski	5	4

==== Section 2 ====
First round
4	(Romania) Elena Bogdan	2	1
(France) Kristina Mladenovic	6	6
(Poland) Sandra Zaniewska	6	6
WC	(United Kingdom) Victoria Brook	0	1
Q	(Slovakia) Romana Tabaková	6	6
WC	(United Kingdom) Jocelyn Rae	0	4
Q	(Thailand) Kanyapat Narattana	2	3
14	(Russia) Elena Chernyakova	6	6
10	(Australia) Johanna Konta	7	6
(South Africa) Monica Gorny	5	1
WC	(United States) CoCo Vandeweghe	2	5
Q	(United Kingdom) Jade Windley	6	7
(Morocco) Nadia Lalami	6	4	4
(Indonesia) Beatrice Gumulya	2	6	6
(Japan) Misaki Doi	4	2
5	(Slovenia) Polona Hercog	6	6

Second round
(France) K Mladenovic	7^{7}	6
(Poland) S Zaniewska	6^{3}	2
Q	(Slovakia) R Tabaková	6	6
14	(Russia) E Chernyakova	1	1
10	(Australia) J Konta	6	6
Q	(United Kingdom) J Windley	3	3
(Indonesia) B Gumulya	1	6^{3}
5	(Slovenia) P Hercog	6	7^{7}

Third round
(France) K Mladenovic	4	3
Q	(Slovakia) R Tabaková	6	6
10	(Australia) J Konta	6	4	3
5	(Slovenia) P Hercog	3	6	6

Quarterfinals
Q	(Slovakia) R Tabaková	6	6
5	(Slovenia) P Hercog	4	1

=== Bottom half ===
==== Section 3 ====
First round
7	(Romania) Ana Bogdan	3	6^{5}
WC	(United Kingdom) Naomi Broady	6	7^{7}
(United States) Mallory Burdette	3	4
(Kazakhstan) Zarina Diyas	6	6
(Russia) Yana Buchina	4	6	3
Q	(Italy) Martina Trevisan	6	4	6
Q	(Canada) Gabriela Dabrowski	1	1
12	(Austria) Nikola Hofmanova	6	6
16	(Poland) Katarzyna Piter	6	6
(United Kingdom) Jade Curtis	4	0
(Japan) Miyabi Inoue	7^{7}	6^{0}	4
Q	(Australia) Tyra Calderwood	6^{5}	7^{7}	6
(Netherlands) Richèl Hogenkamp	5	6	6
(Hungary) Tímea Babos	7	3	3
(Czech Republic) Zuzana Linhová	6	0	1
3	(Thailand) Noppawan Lertcheewakarn	4	6	6

Second round
WC	(United Kingdom) N Broady	6	4	6
(Kazakhstan) Z Diyas	3	6	2
Q	(Italy) M Trevisan	2	2
12	(Austria) N Hofmanova	6	6
16	(Poland) K Piter	3	1
Q	(Australia) T Calderwood	6	6
(Netherlands) R Hogenkamp	3	1
3	(Thailand) N Lertcheewakarn	6	6

Third round
WC	(United Kingdom) N Broady	7^{8}	6
12	(Austria) N Hofmanova	6^{6}	2
Q	(Australia) T Calderwood	2	2
3	(Thailand) N Lertcheewakarn	6	6

Quarterfinals
WC	(United Kingdom) N Broady	7^{8}	3	4
3	(Thailand) N Lertcheewakarn	6^{6}	6	6

==== Section 4 ====
First round
6	(Australia) Jessica Moore	4	6	6
(India) Poojashree Venkatesha	6	3	1
(Slovakia) Zuzana Luknárová	6	3	6
WC	(United Kingdom) Heather Watson	3	6	4
(Belgium) Tamaryn Hendler	6	4	6
(France) Cindy Chala	3	6	1
(Italy) Nastassja Burnett	7^{7}	6
11	(Russia) Ksenia Lykina	6^{5}	3
13	(Indonesia) Jessy Rompies	7^{7}	1	2
(Japan) Aki Yamasoto	6^{3}	6	6
(Hungary) Zsófia Susányi	7^{7}	6
WC	(United Kingdom) Tara Moore	6^{5}	4
(Hong Kong) Yang Zi-Jun	6	6
(Belarus) Anna Orlik	2	1
(Serbia) Milana Špremo	1	3
2	(Netherlands) Arantxa Rus	6	6

Second round
6	(Australia) J Moore	6	6
(Slovakia) Z Luknárová	3	4
(Belgium) T Hendler	6	6
(Italy) N Burnett	0	4
(Japan) A Yamasoto	4	6^{4}
(Hungary) Z Susányi	6	7^{7}
(Hong Kong) Z-J Yang	3	0
2	(Netherlands) A Rus	6	6

Third round
6	(Australia) J Moore	3	3
(Belgium) T Hendler	6	6
(Hungary) Z Susányi	0	4
2	(Netherlands) A Rus	6	6

Quarterfinals
(Belgium) T Hendler	7^{7}	6
2	(Netherlands) A Rus	6^{4}	3
