= 2008 Wimbledon Championships – Girls' doubles =

Girls' doubles
- 2008 Wimbledon Championships

Final
- Champions: (Slovenia) Polona Hercog (Australia) Jessica Moore
- Runners-up: (Australia) Isabella Holland (Australia) Sally Peers
- Score: 6–3, 1–6, 6–2

Events
Singles	men	women		boys	girls
Doubles	men	women	mixed	boys	girls
WC Singles	men	women	quad
WC Doubles	men	women	quad
Legends	men	women	seniors
← 2007 ·	Wimbledon Championships	· 2009 →

Anastasia Pavlyuchenkova and Urszula Radwańska were the defending champions but did not compete in the Juniors this year.

Polona Hercog and Jessica Moore defeated Isabella Holland and Sally Peers in the final, 6–3, 1–6, 6–2 to win the girls' doubles tennis title at the 2008 Wimbledon Championships.

== Seeds ==
1. (Romania) Elena Bogdan / (Serbia) Bojana Jovanovski (quarterfinals)
2. (Romania) Ana Bogdan / (Russia) Ksenia Lykina (second round)
3. (United States) Mallory Burdette / (United States) Melanie Oudin (first round)
4. (Russia) Elena Chernyakova / (Austria) Nikola Hofmanova (second round)
5. (Netherlands) Lesley Kerkhove / (Netherlands) Arantxa Rus (quarterfinals)
6. (Slovenia) Polona Hercog / (Australia) Jessica Moore (champions)
7. (France) Cindy Chala / (Thailand) Noppawan Lertcheewakarn (first round)
8. (Hungary) Tímea Babos / (Hungary) Réka Luca Jani (quarterfinals)

== Draw ==
=== Key ===
- Q = Qualifier
- WC = Wild card
- LL = Lucky loser
- Alt = Alternate
- SE = Special exempt
- PR = Protected ranking
- ITF = ITF entry
- JE = Junior exempt
- w/o = Walkover
- r = Retired
- d = Defaulted
- SR = Special ranking

=== Finals ===
Semifinals
6	(Slovenia) Polona Hercog (Australia) Jessica Moore	4	6	6
WC	(United Kingdom) Jade Curtis (United Kingdom) Jocelyn Rae	6	3	4
(Japan) Misaki Doi (Japan) Kurumi Nara	3	6	7
(Australia) Isabella Holland (Australia) Sally Peers	6	3	9

Final
6	(Slovenia) Polona Hercog (Australia) Jessica Moore	6	1	6
(Australia) Isabella Holland (Australia) Sally Peers	3	6	2

=== Top half ===
First round
1	(Romania) Elena Bogdan (Serbia) Bojana Jovanovski	6	7
(Denmark) Malou Ejdesgaard (Ukraine) Anna Piven	1	5
(Australia) Tyra Calderwood (Australia) Johanna Konta	6	6
(Japan) Miyabi Inoue (Japan) Aki Yamasoto	3	4
(Netherlands) Richèl Hogenkamp (United Kingdom) Laura Robson	6	6^{3}	2
(Czech Republic) Zuzana Linhová (Slovakia) Zuzana Luknárová	4	7^{7}	6
(Thailand) Kanyapat Narattana (Hong Kong) Yang Zi-Jun	3	3
6	(Slovenia) Polona Hercog (Australia) Jessica Moore	6	6
4	(Russia) Elena Chernyakova (Austria) Nikola Hofmanova	6	4	6
(Belarus) Anna Orlik (Russia) Marta Sirotkina	3	6	3
(Canada) Gabriela Dabrowski (Japan) Sachie Ishizu	6^{2}	1
WC	(United Kingdom) Jade Curtis (United Kingdom) Jocelyn Rae	7^{7}	6
WC	(United Kingdom) Amanda Cunningham (United Kingdom) Laura Slater	3	2
(Italy) Anastasia Grymalska (Morocco) Nadia Lalami	6	6
(Russia) Yana Buchina (Kazakhstan) Zarina Diyas	6^{4}	2
5	(Netherlands) Lesley Kerkhove (Netherlands) Arantxa Rus	7^{7}	6

Second round
1	(Romania) E Bogdan (Serbia) B Jovanovski	6^{6}	7^{7}	7
(Australia) T Calderwood (Australia) J Konta	7^{8}	6^{4}	5
(Czech Republic) Z Linhová (Slovakia) Z Luknárová	3	0
6	(Slovenia) P Hercog (Australia) J Moore	6	6
4	(Russia) E Chernyakova (Austria) N Hofmanova	3	3
WC	(United Kingdom) J Curtis (United Kingdom) J Rae	6	6
(Italy) A Grymalska (Morocco) N Lalami	2	2
5	(Netherlands) L Kerkhove (Netherlands) A Rus	6	6

Quarterfinals
1	(Romania) E Bogdan (Serbia) B Jovanovski	1	3
6	(Slovenia) P Hercog (Australia) J Moore	6	6
WC	(United Kingdom) J Curtis (United Kingdom) J Rae	6	7^{7}
5	(Netherlands) L Kerkhove (Netherlands) A Rus	4	6^{2}

Semifinals
6	(Slovenia) P Hercog (Australia) J Moore	4	6	6
WC	(United Kingdom) J Curtis (United Kingdom) J Rae	6	3	4

=== Bottom half ===
First round
8	(Hungary) Tímea Babos (Hungary) Réka Luca Jani
Alt	(Belgium) Tamaryn Hendler (United States) CoCo Vandeweghe	w/o
(Poland) Aleksandra Grela (Poland) Sandra Zaniewska	7^{7}	2	4
WC	(United Kingdom) Naomi Broady (United Kingdom) Jade Windley	6^{4}	6	6
(Germany) Linda Berlinecke (Czech Republic) Martina Borecká	2	5
(South Africa) Monica Gorny (Canada) Rebecca Marino	6	7
(Japan) Misaki Doi (Japan) Kurumi Nara	6	5	9
3	(United States) Mallory Burdette (United States) Melanie Oudin	3	7	7
7	(France) Cindy Chala (Thailand) Noppawan Lertcheewakarn	5	1
(Poland) Katarzyna Piter (Slovakia) Romana Tabaková	7	6
WC	(United Kingdom) Tara Moore (United Kingdom) Heather Watson	6	6
(Bulgaria) Bistra Otashliyska (Ukraine) Alyona Sotnikova	3	3
(Indonesia) Beatrice Gumulya (Indonesia) Jessy Rompies	7^{7}	2	4
(Australia) Isabella Holland (Australia) Sally Peers	6^{5}	6	6
(Serbia) Milano Špremo (Hungary) Zsófia Susányi	1	2
2	(Romania) Ana Bogdan (Russia) Ksenia Lykina	6	6

Second round
8	(Hungary) T Babos (Hungary) RL Jani	7	6
WC	(United Kingdom) N Broady (United Kingdom) J Windley	5	2
(South Africa) M Gorny (Canada) R Marino	5	7^{9}	1
(Japan) M Doi (Japan) K Nara	7	6^{7}	6
(Poland) K Piter (Slovakia) R Tabaková	3	7	7
WC	(United Kingdom) T Moore (United Kingdom) H Watson	6	5	9
(Australia) I Holland (Australia) S Peers	6	7
2	(Romania) A Bogdan (Russia) K Lykina	2	5

Quarterfinals
8	(Hungary) T Babos (Hungary) RL Jani	6	2	1
(Japan) M Doi (Japan) K Nara	1	6	6
WC	(United Kingdom) T Moore (United Kingdom) H Watson	3	3
(Australia) I Holland (Australia) S Peers	6	6

Semifinals
(Japan) M Doi (Japan) K Nara	3	6	7
(Australia) I Holland (Australia) S Peers	6	3	9
