= 2008 Wimbledon Championships – Wheelchair men's doubles =

Wheelchair men's doubles
- 2008 Wimbledon Championships

Final
- Champions: (Netherlands) Robin Ammerlaan (Netherlands) Ronald Vink
- Runners-up: (France) Stéphane Houdet (France) Nicolas Peifer
- Score: 6–7^{(8–10)}, 6–1, 6–3

Events
Singles	men	women		boys	girls
Doubles	men	women	mixed	boys	girls
WC Singles	men	women	quad
WC Doubles	men	women	quad
Legends	men	women	seniors
- Wimbledon Championships

Defending champions Robin Ammerlaan and Ronald Vink defeated Stéphane Houdet and Nicolas Peifer in the final, 6–7^{(8–10)}, 6–1, 6–3 to win the men's doubles wheelchair tennis title at the 2008 Wimbledon Championships.

== Seeds ==
1. (Netherlands) Robin Ammerlaan / (Netherlands) Ronald Vink (champions)
2. (France) Stéphane Houdet / (France) Nicolas Peifer (final)

== Draw ==
Key

- Q = Qualifier
- WC = Wild card
- LL = Lucky loser
- Alt = Alternate
- ITF = ITF entry
- PR = Protected ranking
- SR = Special ranking
- SE = Special exempt
- JE = Junior exempt
- JR = Junior Accelerator Programme entrant
- CO = College Accelerator Programme entrant
- NG = Next Gen Accelerator Program entrant
- w/o = Walkover
- r = Retired
- d = Defaulted

=== Finals ===
Semifinals
1	(Netherlands) Robin Ammerlaan (Netherlands) Ronald Vink	6	6
WC	(United Kingdom) David Phillipson (United Kingdom) Gordon Reid	0	2
(Poland) Tadeusz Kruszelnicki (Austria) Martin Legner	2	3
2	(France) Stéphane Houdet (France) Nicolas Peifer	6	6

Final
1	(Netherlands) Robin Ammerlaan (Netherlands) Ronald Vink	6^{8}	6	6
2	(France) Stéphane Houdet (France) Nicolas Peifer	7^{10}	1	3
3rd place play-off
WC	(United Kingdom) David Phillipson (United Kingdom) Gordon Reid	4	2
(Poland) Tadeusz Kruszelnicki (Austria) Martin Legner	6	6
