= 2008 Wimbledon Championships – Mixed doubles =

Mixed doubles
- 2008 Wimbledon Championships

Final
- Champions: (United States) Bob Bryan (Australia) Samantha Stosur
- Runners-up: (United States) Mike Bryan (Slovenia) Katarina Srebotnik
- Score: 7–5, 6–4

Details
- Draw: 48 (5 WC )
- Seeds: 16

Events
Singles	men	women		boys	girls
Doubles	men	women	mixed	boys	girls
WC Singles	men	women	quad
WC Doubles	men	women	quad
Legends	men	women	seniors
← 2007 ·	Wimbledon Championships	· 2009 →

Bob Bryan and Samantha Stosur defeated Mike Bryan and Katarina Srebotnik in the final, 7–5, 6–4 to win the mixed doubles tennis title at the 2008 Wimbledon Championships.

Jamie Murray and Jelena Janković were the reigning champions, but Janković did not participate. Murray partnered Liezel Huber, but they lost in the semifinals to Bob Bryan and Stosur.

== Seeds ==
All seeds received a bye into the second round.

1. (United States) Mike Bryan / (Slovenia) Katarina Srebotnik (final)
2. (Canada) Daniel Nestor / (Chinese Taipei) Chuang Chia-jung (quarterfinals)
3. (Czech Republic) Pavel Vízner / (Czech Republic) Květa Peschke (quarterfinals)
4. (Australia) Paul Hanley / (Zimbabwe) Cara Black (third round)
5. (Zimbabwe) Kevin Ullyett / (Japan) Ai Sugiyama (quarterfinals)
6. (Austria) Julian Knowle / (Chinese Taipei) Chan Yung-jan (third round)
7. (The Bahamas) Mark Knowles / (China) Yan Zi (second round)
8. (Serbia) Nenad Zimonjić / (China) Sun Tiantian (second round)
9. (Israel) Andy Ram / (France) Nathalie Dechy (quarterfinals)
10. (India) Leander Paes / (Australia) Rennae Stubbs (second round)
11. (India) Mahesh Bhupathi / (India) Sania Mirza (second round)
12. (United Kingdom) Jamie Murray / (United States) Liezel Huber (semifinals)
13. (Sweden) Simon Aspelin / (United States) Lisa Raymond (third round, withdrew)
14. (Czech Republic) Martin Damm / (China) Peng Shuai (third round)
15. (South Africa) Jeff Coetzee / (Czech Republic) Vladimíra Uhlířová (second round)
16. (Australia) Jordan Kerr / (Ukraine) Kateryna Bondarenko (second round)

Click on the seed number of a player to go to their draw section.

== Draw ==
=== Key ===
- Q = Qualifier
- WC = Wild card
- LL = Lucky loser
- Alt = Alternate
- ITF = ITF entry
- PR = Protected ranking
- SR = Special ranking
- SE = Special exempt
- JE = Junior exempt
- JR = Junior Accelerator Programme entrant
- CO = College Accelerator Programme entrant
- NG = Next Gen Accelerator Program entrant
- w/o = Walkover
- r = Retired
- d = Defaulted

=== Finals ===
Quarterfinals
1	(United States) Mike Bryan (Slovenia) Katarina Srebotnik	6	3	6
5	(Zimbabwe) Kevin Ullyett (Japan) Ai Sugiyama	3	6	3
3	(Czech Republic) Pavel Vízner (Czech Republic) Květa Peschke	3	4
(Russia) Igor Andreev (Russia) Maria Kirilenko	6	6
9	(Israel) Andy Ram (France) Nathalie Dechy	4	2
(United States) Bob Bryan (Australia) Samantha Stosur	6	6
12	(United Kingdom) Jamie Murray (United States) Liezel Huber	6	7
2	(Canada) Daniel Nestor (Chinese Taipei) Chuang Chia-jung	4	5

Semifinals
1	(United States) Mike Bryan (Slovenia) Katarina Srebotnik	6	6
(Russia) Igor Andreev (Russia) Maria Kirilenko	4	2
(United States) Bob Bryan (Australia) Samantha Stosur	2	7^{7}	6
12	(United Kingdom) Jamie Murray (United States) Liezel Huber	6	6^{1}	4

Final
1	(United States) Mike Bryan (Slovenia) Katarina Srebotnik	5	4
(United States) Bob Bryan (Australia) Samantha Stosur	7	6

=== Top half ===
==== Section 1 ====
First round
(Brazil) B Soares (Spain) MJ Martínez Sánchez	7^{7}	2	3
(Poland) M Matkowski (Denmark) C Wozniacki	6^{5}	6	6
(Argentina) A Calleri (Estonia) K Kanepi	6	6
WC	(United Kingdom) R Bloomfield (United Kingdom) S Borwell	4	2
(Sweden) J Björkman (Australia) A Molik	4	6	6
(Czech Republic) F Čermák (Czech Republic) L Hradecká	6	3	1
(Serbia) D Vemić (Italy) F Pennetta	6	6
(Thailand) Sa Ratiwatana (Spain) N Llagostera Vives	3	2

Second round
1	(United States) M Bryan (Slovenia) K Srebotnik	6	6
(Poland) M Matkowski (Denmark) C Wozniacki	3	2
(Argentina) A Calleri (Estonia) K Kanepi	w/o
14	(Czech Republic) M Damm (China) S Peng
10	(India) L Paes (Australia) R Stubbs	3	6	3
(Sweden) J Björkman (Australia) A Molik	6	3	6
(Serbia) D Vemić (Italy) F Pennetta	6	5	5
5	(Zimbabwe) K Ullyett (Japan) A Sugiyama	2	7	7

Third round
1	(United States) M Bryan (Slovenia) K Srebotnik	7^{7}	6
14	(Czech Republic) M Damm (China) S Peng	6^{4}	2
(Sweden) J Björkman (Australia) A Molik	7^{7}	2	2
5	(Zimbabwe) K Ullyett (Japan) A Sugiyama	6^{5}	6	6

Quarterfinals
1	(United States) M Bryan (Slovenia) K Srebotnik	6	3	6
5	(Zimbabwe) K Ullyett (Japan) A Sugiyama	3	6	3

==== Section 2 ====
First round
WC	(United Kingdom) J Auckland (United Kingdom) E Baltacha	7^{7}	6^{4}	7
(Czech Republic) D Škoch (Czech Republic) I Benešová	6^{3}	7^{7}	9
(Russia) I Kunitsyn (Russia) E Vesnina	4	6	4
(India) R Bopanna (Belarus) T Poutchek	6	2	6
(Russia) I Andreev (Russia) M Kirilenko	4	6	7
Alt	(Thailand) So Ratiwatana (Russia) A Kleybanova	6	1	5
(Brazil) M Melo (France) A Cornet	7	4	2
(Czech Republic) L Dlouhý (Czech Republic) N Vaidišová	5	6	6

Second round
3	(Czech Republic) P Vízner (Czech Republic) K Peschke	6	7^{7}
(Czech Republic) D Škoch (Czech Republic) I Benešová	1	6^{3}
(India) R Bopanna (Belarus) T Poutchek	3	6^{1}
13	(Sweden) S Aspelin (United States) L Raymond	6	7^{7}
11	(India) M Bhupathi (India) S Mirza	6^{4}	3
(Russia) I Andreev (Russia) M Kirilenko	7^{7}	6
(Czech Republic) L Dlouhý (Czech Republic) N Vaidišová	7	7
8	(Serbia) N Zimonjić (China) T Sun	5	5

Third round
3	(Czech Republic) P Vízner (Czech Republic) K Peschke
13	(Sweden) S Aspelin (United States) L Raymond	w/o
(Russia) I Andreev (Russia) M Kirilenko
(Czech Republic) L Dlouhý (Czech Republic) N Vaidišová	w/o

Quarterfinals
3	(Czech Republic) P Vízner (Czech Republic) K Peschke	3	4
(Russia) I Andreev (Russia) M Kirilenko	6	6

=== Bottom half ===
==== Section 3 ====
First round
(United States) S Lipsky (Australia) C Dellacqua	4	6	7
(Spain) F Verdasco (Poland) M Domachowska	6	3	5
(Netherlands) R Wassen (France) V Razzano	6	3	2
WC	(United Kingdom) J Delgado (United Kingdom) K O'Brien	4	6	6
(United States) B Bryan (Australia) S Stosur	6^{5}	6	6
(United States) E Butorac (United States) B Mattek	7^{7}	1	3
WC	(United Kingdom) A Bogdanovic (United Kingdom) M South	6^{6}	6	7
(Switzerland) Y Allegro (Hungary) A Szávay	7^{8}	2	9

Second round
7	(The Bahamas) M Knowles (China) Z Yan	3	6	4
(United States) S Lipsky (Australia) C Dellacqua	6	3	6
(United Kingdom) J Delgado (United Kingdom) K O'Brien	4	0
9	(Israel) A Ram (France) N Dechy	6	6
16	(Australia) J Kerr (Ukraine) K Bondarenko	0	5
(United States) B Bryan (Australia) S Stosur	6	7
(Switzerland) Y Allegro (Hungary) A Szávay	4	4
4	(Australia) P Hanley (Zimbabwe) C Black	6	6

Third round
(United States) S Lipsky (Australia) C Dellacqua	3	5
9	(Israel) A Ram (France) N Dechy	6	7
(United States) B Bryan (Australia) S Stosur	6	4	6
4	(Australia) P Hanley (Zimbabwe) C Black	4	6	1

Quarterfinals
9	(Israel) A Ram (France) N Dechy	4	2
(United States) B Bryan (Australia) S Stosur	6	6

==== Section 4 ====
First round
WC	(United Kingdom) R Hutchins (United Kingdom) A Keothavong	5	6	6
(Australia) T Perry (Italy) M Santangelo	7	1	4
(United States) D Martin (United States) V King	4	2
(Russia) D Tursunov (Russia) N Petrova	6	6
(Sweden) R Lindstedt (Russia) A Rodionova	6	5	1
(Belarus) M Mirnyi (Belarus) O Govortsova	4	7	6
(Brazil) A Sá (Slovakia) J Husárová	2	2
(South Africa) W Moodie (United States) J Craybas	6	6

Second round
6	(Austria) J Knowle (Chinese Taipei) Y-j Chan	6	6
WC	(United Kingdom) R Hutchins (United Kingdom) A Keothavong	4	4
(Russia) D Tursunov (Russia) N Petrova	2	6	7
12	(United Kingdom) J Murray (United States) L Huber	6	2	9
15	(South Africa) J Coetzee (Czech Republic) V Uhlířová	6	4	1
(Belarus) M Mirnyi (Belarus) O Govortsova	4	6	6
(South Africa) W Moodie (United States) J Craybas	6^{5}	2
2	(Canada) D Nestor (Chinese Taipei) C-j Chuang	7^{7}	6

Third round
6	(Austria) J Knowle (Chinese Taipei) Y-j Chan	4	3
12	(United Kingdom) J Murray (United States) L Huber	6	6
(Belarus) M Mirnyi (Belarus) O Govortsova	3	6^{4}
2	(Canada) D Nestor (Chinese Taipei) C-j Chuang	6	7^{7}

Quarterfinals
12	(United Kingdom) J Murray (United States) L Huber	6	7
2	(Canada) D Nestor (Chinese Taipei) C-j Chuang	4	5
