= 2008 Wimbledon Championships – Women's doubles =

Women's doubles
- 2008 Wimbledon Championships

Final
- Champions: (United States) Serena Williams (United States) Venus Williams
- Runners-up: (United States) Lisa Raymond (Australia) Samantha Stosur
- Score: 6–2, 6–2

Details
- Draw: 64 (4 Q / 5 WC )
- Seeds: 16

Events
Singles	men	women		boys	girls
Doubles	men	women	mixed	boys	girls
WC Singles	men	women	quad
WC Doubles	men	women	quad
Legends	men	women	seniors
← 2007 ·	Wimbledon Championships	· 2009 →

Serena and Venus Williams defeated Lisa Raymond and Samantha Stosur in the final, 6–2, 6–2 to win the ladies' doubles tennis title at the 2008 Wimbledon Championships. It was their third Wimbledon title together and seventh major title together overall. They did not lose a set during the tournament. The Williams sisters played against each other in the singles final as well, in which Venus emerged victorious.

Cara Black and Liezel Huber were the defending champions but lost in the semifinals to Raymond and Stosur.

== Seeds ==
1. (Zimbabwe) Cara Black / (United States) Liezel Huber (semifinals)
2. (Japan) Ai Sugiyama / (Slovenia) Katarina Srebotnik (second round)
3. (Czech Republic) Květa Peschke / (Australia) Rennae Stubbs (third round)
4. (Chinese Taipei) Chan Yung-jan / (Chinese Taipei) Chuang Chia-jung (first round)
5. (Spain) Anabel Medina Garrigues / (Spain) Virginia Ruano Pascual (third round)
6. (Belarus) Victoria Azarenka / (Israel) Shahar Pe'er (quarterfinals)
7. (Ukraine) Alona Bondarenko / (Ukraine) Kateryna Bondarenko (withdrew)
8. (China) Peng Shuai / (China) Sun Tiantian (first round)

9. (China) Yan Zi / (China) Zheng Jie (third round)
10. (Russia) Dinara Safina / (Hungary) Ágnes Szávay (third round)
11. (United States) Serena Williams / (United States) Venus Williams (champions)
12. (Russia) Svetlana Kuznetsova / (France) Amélie Mauresmo (withdrew)
13. (United States) Bethanie Mattek / (India) Sania Mirza (quarterfinals)
14. (Australia) Alicia Molik / (Italy) Mara Santangelo (first round)
15. (Czech Republic) Iveta Benešová / (Slovakia) Janette Husárová (second round)
16. (United States) Lisa Raymond / (Australia) Samantha Stosur (final)

Click on the seed number of a player to go to their draw section.

== Draw ==
=== Key ===
- Q = Qualifier
- WC = Wild card
- LL = Lucky loser
- Alt = Alternate
- ITF = ITF entry
- PR = Protected ranking
- SR = Special ranking
- SE = Special exempt
- JE = Junior exempt
- JR = Junior Accelerator Programme entrant
- CO = College Accelerator Programme entrant
- NG = Next Gen Accelerator Program entrant
- w/o = Walkover
- r = Retired
- d = Defaulted

=== Finals ===
Quarterfinals
1	(Zimbabwe) Cara Black (United States) Liezel Huber	7	7^{7}
6	(Belarus) Victoria Azarenka (Israel) Shahar Pe'er	5	6^{4}
16	(United States) Lisa Raymond (Australia) Samantha Stosur	6	6
(Russia) Ekaterina Makarova (Tunisia) Selima Sfar	4	3
11	(United States) Serena Williams (United States) Venus Williams	6	6
13	(United States) Bethanie Mattek (India) Sania Mirza	4	3
(Spain) Nuria Llagostera Vives (Spain) María José Martínez Sánchez	2	7^{8}	4
(France) Nathalie Dechy (Australia) Casey Dellacqua	6	6^{6}	6

Semifinals
1	(Zimbabwe) Cara Black (United States) Liezel Huber	3	3
16	(United States) Lisa Raymond (Australia) Samantha Stosur	6	6
11	(United States) Serena Williams (United States) Venus Williams	6	6
(France) Nathalie Dechy (Australia) Casey Dellacqua	3	3

Final
16	(United States) Lisa Raymond (Australia) Samantha Stosur	2	2
11	(United States) Serena Williams (United States) Venus Williams	6	6

=== Top half ===
==== Section 1 ====
First round
1	(Zimbabwe) C Black (United States) L Huber	6	6
(South Africa) N Grandin (Bulgaria) T Pironkova	1	0
(France) V Razzano (Ukraine) J Vakulenko	3	2
(Russia) V Dushevina (Belarus) E Dzehalevich	6	6
(United States) V King (Russia) A Kudryavtseva	6	6
Q	(Czech Republic) A Hlaváčková (Ukraine) O Savchuk	3	3
(New Zealand) M Erakovic (Netherlands) M Krajicek	0	2
15	(Czech Republic) I Benešová (Slovakia) J Husárová	6	6
10	(Russia) D Safina (Hungary) Á Szávay	6	6
(Italy) T Garbin (Ukraine) M Koryttseva	2	1
(Czech Republic) G Navrátilová (Czech Republic) K Zakopalová	6^{1}	6^{5}
(France) É Loit (France) P Parmentier	7^{7}	7^{7}
LL	(United States) C Fusano (United States) A Haynes	7^{8}	6
(Romania) E Gallovits (Belarus) O Govortsova	6^{6}	2
(Czech Republic) L Hradecká (Czech Republic) R Voráčová	5	4
6	(Belarus) V Azarenka (Israel) S Pe'er	7	6

Second round
1	(Zimbabwe) C Black (United States) L Huber	6	6
(Russia) V Dushevina (Belarus) E Dzehalevich	0	2
(United States) V King (Russia) A Kudryavtseva	6	6
15	(Czech Republic) I Benešová (Slovakia) J Husárová	3	4
10	(Russia) D Safina (Hungary) Á Szávay	6	7^{7}
(France) É Loit (France) P Parmentier	4	6^{1}
LL	(United States) C Fusano (United States) A Haynes	6^{5}	1
6	(Belarus) V Azarenka (Israel) S Pe'er	7^{7}	6

Third round
1	(Zimbabwe) C Black (United States) L Huber	6	6
(United States) V King (Russia) A Kudryavtseva	1	3
10	(Russia) D Safina (Hungary) Á Szávay	5	4
6	(Belarus) V Azarenka (Israel) S Pe'er	7	6

Quarterfinals
1	(Zimbabwe) C Black (United States) L Huber	7	7^{7}
6	(Belarus) V Azarenka (Israel) S Pe'er	5	6^{4}

==== Section 2 ====
First round
3	(Czech Republic) K Peschke (Australia) R Stubbs	6	6
(Austria) S Bammer (Germany) M Müller	2	2
(Slovakia) D Cibulková (Russia) A Kleybanova	1	0^{r}
(Romania) S Cirstea (Romania) M Niculescu	6	0
(Chinese Taipei) S-w Hsieh (United States) M Washington	1	2
(Russia) Y Shvedova (Thailand) T Tanasugarn	6	6
(United States) A Harkleroad (Russia) G Voskoboeva	6	2	1
16	(United States) L Raymond (Australia) S Stosur	3	6	6
9	(China) Z Yan (China) J Zheng	6	6
(Spain) A Parra Santonja (Spain) C Suárez Navarro	4	2
(Czech Republic) E Hrdinová (Czech Republic) P Kvitová	6^{8}	6	2
(Russia) E Vesnina (Russia) V Zvonareva	7^{10}	4	6
(Czech Republic) P Cetkovská (Czech Republic) L Šafářová	3	2
(Italy) ME Camerin (Argentina) G Dulko	6	6
(Russia) E Makarova (Tunisia) S Sfar	6	6
LL	(Japan) A Morita (Japan) J Namigata	3	3

Second round
3	(Czech Republic) K Peschke (Australia) R Stubbs	6	6
(Romania) S Cirstea (Romania) M Niculescu	1	2
(Russia) Y Shvedova (Thailand) T Tanasugarn	5	7^{9}	4
16	(United States) L Raymond (Australia) S Stosur	7	6^{7}	6
9	(China) Z Yan (China) J Zheng	6	6
(Russia) E Vesnina (Russia) V Zvonareva	3	2
(Italy) ME Camerin (Argentina) G Dulko	3	0
(Russia) E Makarova (Tunisia) S Sfar	6	6

Third round
3	(Czech Republic) K Peschke (Australia) R Stubbs	2	6^{3}
16	(United States) L Raymond (Australia) S Stosur	6	7^{7}
9	(China) Z Yan (China) J Zheng	5	4
(Russia) E Makarova (Tunisia) S Sfar	7	6

Quarterfinals
16	(United States) L Raymond (Australia) S Stosur	6	6
(Russia) E Makarova (Tunisia) S Sfar	4	3

=== Bottom half ===
==== Section 3 ====
First round
5	(Spain) A Medina Garrigues (Spain) V Ruano Pascual	6	6
(France) S Foretz (France) C Pin	3	1
(Austria) T Paszek (Germany) J Wöhr	5	6^{6}
(Italy) S Errani (Italy) F Schiavone	7	7^{8}
WC	(United Kingdom) S Borwell (United Kingdom) J Rae	3	4
(Poland) M Domachowska (Poland) A Radwańska	6	6
(Belarus) T Poutchek (Russia) A Rodionova	0	3
11	(United States) S Williams (United States) V Williams	6	6
13	(United States) B Mattek (India) S Mirza	6	6
WC	(United Kingdom) E Baltacha (United Kingdom) N Cavaday	4	2
(United States) J Craybas (Denmark) C Wozniacki	1	3
Q	(Russia) M Kirilenko (Italy) F Pennetta	6	6
WC	(United Kingdom) A Keothavong (United Kingdom) M South	7^{7}	6
(China) C Ji (China) S Sun	6^{5}	4
(Uzbekistan) A Amanmuradova (Belarus) D Kustova	4	7^{7}	6
4	(Chinese Taipei) Y-j Chan (Chinese Taipei) C-j Chuang	6	6^{3}	4

Second round
5	(Spain) A Medina Garrigues (Spain) V Ruano Pascual	6	6
(Italy) S Errani (Italy) F Schiavone	1	3
(Poland) M Domachowska (Poland) A Radwańska	0	4
11	(United States) S Williams (United States) V Williams	6	6
13	(United States) B Mattek (India) S Mirza	6	6
Q	(Russia) M Kirilenko (Italy) F Pennetta	3	4
WC	(United Kingdom) A Keothavong (United Kingdom) M South	4	6	5
(Uzbekistan) A Amanmuradova (Belarus) D Kustova	6	4	7

Third round
5	(Spain) A Medina Garrigues (Spain) V Ruano Pascual	1	4
11	(United States) S Williams (United States) V Williams	6	6
13	(United States) B Mattek (India) S Mirza	4	6	2
(Uzbekistan) A Amanmuradova (Belarus) D Kustova	6	4	0^{r}

Quarterfinals
11	(United States) S Williams (United States) V Williams	6	6
13	(United States) B Mattek (India) S Mirza	4	3

==== Section 4 ====
First round
8	(China) S Peng (China) T Sun	6	4	7
(Colombia) C Castaño (Estonia) K Kanepi	2	6	9
(Poland) K Jans (Bosnia and Herzegovina) M Jugić-Salkić	3	6	5
(United States) C Gullickson (Czech Republic) V Uhlířová	6	4	7
(Japan) A Nakamura (France) A Rezaï	7	6
WC	(United Kingdom) A Elliott (United Kingdom) K O'Brien	5	4
(Spain) N Llagostera Vives (Spain) MJ Martínez Sánchez	7^{9}	7^{7}
LL	(United Kingdom) A Smith (United Kingdom) G Stoop	6^{7}	6^{3}
14	(Australia) A Molik (Italy) M Santangelo	5	7^{7}	4
(Ukraine) T Perebiynis (Poland) A Rosolska	7	6^{2}	6
WC	(United Kingdom) A Fitzpatrick (United Kingdom) A Hawkins	1	0
(France) N Dechy (Australia) C Dellacqua	6	6
(Switzerland) T Bacsinszky (France) A Cornet	6	5	2
Q	(United States) R Kops-Jones (United States) A Spears	3	7	6
Q	(Argentina) J Cravero (Argentina) B Jozami	4	0
2	(Japan) A Sugiyama (Slovenia) K Srebotnik	6	6

Second round
(Colombia) C Castaño (Estonia) K Kanepi	7	6
(United States) C Gullickson (Czech Republic) V Uhlířová	5	4
(Japan) A Nakamura (France) A Rezaï	2	5
(Spain) N Llagostera Vives (Spain) MJ Martínez Sánchez	6	7
(Ukraine) T Perebiynis (Poland) A Rosolska	3	2
(France) N Dechy (Australia) C Dellacqua	6	6
Q	(United States) R Kops-Jones (United States) A Spears	2	6	11
2	(Japan) A Sugiyama (Slovenia) K Srebotnik	6	3	9

Third round
(Colombia) C Castaño (Estonia) K Kanepi	4	4
(Spain) N Llagostera Vives (Spain) MJ Martínez Sánchez	6	6
(France) N Dechy (Australia) C Dellacqua	6	7^{11}
Q	(United States) R Kops-Jones (United States) A Spears	3	6^{9}

Quarterfinals
(Spain) N Llagostera Vives (Spain) MJ Martínez Sánchez	2	7^{8}	4
(France) N Dechy (Australia) C Dellacqua	6	6^{6}	6
