= 2008 Wimbledon Championships – Gentlemen's invitation doubles =

Gentlemen's invitation doubles
- 2008 Wimbledon Championships

Final
- Champions: (United States) Donald Johnson (United States) Jared Palmer
- Runners-up: (Netherlands) Jacco Eltingh (Netherlands) Paul Haarhuis
- Score: walkover

Events
Singles	men	women		boys	girls
Doubles	men	women	mixed	boys	girls
WC Singles	men	women	quad
WC Doubles	men	women	quad
Legends	men	women	seniors
← 2007 ·	Wimbledon Championships	· 2009 →

Donald Johnson and Jared Palmer were declared the winners of the gentlemen's invitation doubles tennis title at the 2008 Wimbledon Championships after defending champions Jacco Eltingh and Paul Haarhuis withdrew from the final.

== Draw ==
=== Key ===
- Q = Qualifier
- WC = Wild card
- LL = Lucky loser
- Alt = Alternate
- ITF = ITF entry
- PR = Protected ranking
- SR = Special ranking
- SE = Special exempt
- JE = Junior exempt
- JR = Junior Accelerator Programme entrant
- CO = College Accelerator Programme entrant
- NG = Next Gen Accelerator Program entrant
- w/o = Walkover
- r = Retired
- d = Defaulted

=== Final ===
Final
(Netherlands) Jacco Eltingh (Netherlands) Paul Haarhuis	w/o
(United States) Donald Johnson (United States) Jared Palmer

=== Group A ===
	(Australia) Cash (South Africa) Ferreira	(Netherlands) Eltingh (Netherlands) Haarhuis	(United States) Middleton (United States) Wheaton	(United Kingdom) Petchey (United Kingdom) Wilkinson	RR; W–L	Set; W–L	Game; W–L	Standings
(Australia) Pat Cash (South Africa) Wayne Ferreira		5–7, 3–6	7–5, 6–7^{(5–7)}, [11–13]	7–6^{(7–3)}, 7–6^{(7–4)}	1–2	3–4	35–38	2
(Netherlands) Jacco Eltingh (Netherlands) Paul Haarhuis	7–5, 6–3		6–4, 6–1	4–6, 6–3, [10–4]	3–0	6–1	36–22	1
(United States) T. J. Middleton (United States) David Wheaton	5–7, 7–6^{(5–7)}, [13–11]	4–6, 1–6		4–6, 4–6	1–2	2–5	26–37	4
(United Kingdom) Mark Petchey (United Kingdom) Chris Wilkinson	6–7^{(3–7)}, 6–7^{(4–7)}	6–4, 3–6, [4–10]	6–4, 6–4		1–2	3–4	33–33	3

Standings are determined by: 1. number of wins; 2. number of matches; 3. in two-players-ties, head-to-head records; 4. in three-players-ties, percentage of sets won, or of games won; 5. steering-committee decision.

=== Group B ===
	(France) Forget (France) Pioline	(United States) L Jensen (United States) M Jensen	(United States) Johnson (United States) Palmer	(Australia) Woodbridge (Australia) Woodforde	RR; W–L	Set; W–L	Game; W–L	Standings
(France) Guy Forget (France) Cédric Pioline		6–4, 6–2	3–6, 3–6	6–7^{(3–7)}, 3–6	1–2	2–4	27–31	3
(United States) Luke Jensen (United States) Murphy Jensen	4–6, 2–6		2–6, 4–6	6–7^{(2–7)}, 2–6	0–3	0–6	20–37	4
(United States) Donald Johnson (United States) Jared Palmer	6–3, 6–3	6–2, 6–4		6–3, 7–6^{(7–4)}	3–0	6–0	37–21	1
(Australia) Todd Woodbridge (Australia) Mark Woodforde	7–6^{(7–3)}, 6–3	7–6^{(7–2)}, 6–2	3–6, 6–7^{(4–7)}		2–1	4–2	35–30	2

Standings are determined by: 1. number of wins; 2. number of matches; 3. in two-players-ties, head-to-head records; 4. in three-players-ties, percentage of sets won, or of games won; 5. steering-committee decision.
