= 2008 Wimbledon Championships – Boys' singles =

Boys' singles
- 2008 Wimbledon Championships

Final
- Champion: (Bulgaria) Grigor Dimitrov
- Runner-up: (Finland) Henri Kontinen
- Score: 7–5, 6–3

Details
- Draw: 64 (8 Q / 8 WC )
- Seeds: 16

Events
Singles	men	women		boys	girls
Doubles	men	women	mixed	boys	girls
WC Singles	men	women	quad
WC Doubles	men	women	quad
Legends	men	women	seniors
← 2007 ·	Wimbledon Championships	· 2009 →

Grigor Dimitrov defeated Henri Kontinen in the final, 7–5, 6–3 to win the boys' singles tennis title at the 2008 Wimbledon Championships.

Kontinen would go on to become a future World No. 1 doubles player and win the 2016 Mixed Doubles title at these Championships. This event also featured future Wimbledon Men's Singles finalist Milos Raonic.

Donald Young was the defending champion, but was no longer eligible to compete in junior events.

== Seeds ==
1. (Australia) Bernard Tomic (semifinals)
2. (Chinese Taipei) Yang Tsung-hua (third round)
3. (Mexico) César Ramírez (quarterfinals)
4. (Poland) Jerzy Janowicz (second round)
5. (India) Yuki Bhambri (first round)
6. (Brazil) Henrique Cunha (quarterfinals)
7. (United States) Ryan Harrison (second round)
8. (El Salvador) Marcelo Arévalo (first round)
9. (Bulgaria) Grigor Dimitrov (champion)
10. (Germany) Cedrik-Marcel Stebe (second round)
11. (Russia) Alexei Grigorov (second round)
12. (Thailand) Peerakit Siributwong (first round)
13. (Belgium) David Goffin (first round)
14. (United States) Chase Buchanan (second round)
15. (United Kingdom) Marcus Willis (third round)
16. (United States) Bradley Klahn (third round)

Click on the seed number of a player to go to their draw section.

== Draw ==
=== Key ===
- Q = Qualifier
- WC = Wild card
- LL = Lucky loser
- Alt = Alternate
- ITF = ITF entry
- PR = Protected ranking
- SR = Special ranking
- SE = Special exempt
- JE = Junior exempt
- JR = Junior Accelerator Programme entrant
- CO = College Accelerator Programme entrant
- NG = Next Gen Accelerator Program entrant
- w/o = Walkover
- r = Retired
- d = Defaulted

=== Finals ===
Quarterfinals
1	(Australia) Bernard Tomic	4	6	6
6	(Brazil) Henrique Cunha	6	4	3
(Finland) Henri Kontinen	6	6
Q	(Australia) Dane Propoggia	2	2
9	(Bulgaria) Grigor Dimitrov	6	7
3	(Mexico) César Ramírez	3	5
Q	(Serbia) Filip Krajinović	7^{7}	6
(Australia) Andrew Thomas	6^{2}	4

Semifinals
1	(Australia) Bernard Tomic	6^{3}	4
(Finland) Henri Kontinen	7^{7}	6
9	(Bulgaria) Grigor Dimitrov	6	6
Q	(Serbia) Filip Krajinović	3	3

Final
(Finland) Henri Kontinen	5	3
9	(Bulgaria) Grigor Dimitrov	7	6

=== Top half ===
==== Section 1 ====
First round
1	(Australia) Bernard Tomic	6	6
WC	(Spain) Carlos Boluda-Purkiss	2	1
(Indonesia) Christopher Rungkat	3	7	6
WC	(United Kingdom) James Marsalek	6	5	1
Q	(United States) Devin Britton	3	7^{7}	4
Q	(Japan) Hiroyasu Ehara	6	6^{2}	6
(Italy) Giacomo Miccini	3	6	9
15	(United Kingdom) Marcus Willis	6	3	11
11	(Russia) Alexei Grigorov	6	3	6
(Zimbabwe) Takanyi Garanganga	2	6	3
WC	(United Kingdom) Neil Pauffley	3	4
Q	(Austria) Philipp Lang	6	6
Q	(Canada) Milos Raonic	6	7^{7}
WC	(United Kingdom) James Chaudry	4	6^{5}
(United States) Jarmere Jenkins	2	3
6	(Brazil) Henrique Cunha	6	6

Second round
1	(Australia) B Tomic	2	6	6
(Indonesia) C Rungkat	6	1	4
Q	(Japan) H Ehara	4	2
15	(United Kingdom) M Willis	6	6
11	(Russia) A Grigorov	3	4
Q	(Austria) P Lang	6	6
Q	(Canada) M Raonic	4	4
6	(Brazil) H Cunha	6	6

Third round
1	(Australia) B Tomic	6	5	6
15	(United Kingdom) M Willis	3	7	4
Q	(Austria) P Lang	2	2
6	(Brazil) H Cunha	6	6

Quarterfinals
1	(Australia) B Tomic	4	6	6
6	(Brazil) H Cunha	6	4	3

==== Section 2 ====
First round
4	(Poland) Jerzy Janowicz	4	6	6
WC	(United Kingdom) Mathew James	6	2	2
WC	(United Kingdom) Thomas Knights	4	4
(China) Zhang Ze	6	6
(Finland) Henri Kontinen	7^{7}	7^{7}
(Belgium) Alexandre Folie	6^{5}	6^{3}
(Japan) Tadayuki Longhi	3	6^{7}
14	(United States) Chase Buchanan	6	7^{9}
12	(Thailand) Peerakit Siributwong	6^{4}	6	2
(United Kingdom) Dan Evans	7^{7}	4	6
Q	(Italy) Erik Crepaldi	4	1
(France) Guillaume Rufin	6	6
Q	(Australia) Dane Propoggia	6	3	11
(Slovenia) Borut Puc	4	6	9
(Bosnia and Herzegovina) Mirza Bašić	6	6
8	(El Salvador) Marcelo Arévalo	4	1

Second round
4	(Poland) J Janowicz	6	4	3
(China) Z Zhang	4	6	6
(Finland) H Kontinen	6	6
14	(United States) C Buchanan	4	2
(United Kingdom) D Evans	7^{10}	1	6
(France) G Rufin	6^{8}	6	4
Q	(Australia) D Propoggia	4	6	6
(Bosnia and Herzegovina) M Bašić	6	4	1

Third round
(China) Z Zhang	2	6	6
(Finland) H Kontinen	6	3	8
(United Kingdom) D Evans	6^{5}	4
Q	(Australia) D Propoggia	7^{7}	6

Quarterfinals
(Finland) H Kontinen	6	6
Q	(Australia) D Propoggia	2	2

=== Bottom half ===
==== Section 3 ====
First round
5	(India) Yuki Bhambri	6^{2}	4
(United States) Ty Trombetta	7^{7}	6
(Netherlands) Xander Spong	2	3
(Australia) Mark Verryth	6	6
(United Kingdom) Stephan Werthauer	6	4	6
(Chile) Cristóbal Saavedra Corvalán	4	6	4
Q	(Slovenia) Blaž Rola	6^{6}	3
9	(Bulgaria) Grigor Dimitrov	7^{8}	6
16	(United States) Bradley Klahn	6	6^{7}	6
(China) Wu Di	4	7^{9}	0
(Italy) Lorenzo Papasidero	3	3
(United Kingdom) Daniel Smethurst	6	6
(Colombia) Juan Carlos Spir	6	6^{3}	6
LL	(Austria) Nikolaus Moser	4	7^{7}	2
(Australia) Matt Reid	3	3
3	(Mexico) César Ramírez	6	6

Second round
(United States) T Trombetta	7^{7}	6
(Australia) M Verryth	6^{1}	3
(United Kingdom) S Werthauer	6^{3}	4
9	(Bulgaria) G Dimitrov	7^{7}	6
16	(United States) B Klahn	7^{7}	6
(United Kingdom) D Smethurst	6^{4}	4
(Colombia) JC Spir	2	2
3	(Mexico) C Ramírez	6	6

Third round
(United States) T Trombetta	0	1
9	(Bulgaria) G Dimitrov	6	6
16	(United States) B Klahn	6^{1}	2
3	(Mexico) C Ramírez	7^{7}	6

Quarterfinals
9	(Bulgaria) G Dimitrov	6	7
3	(Mexico) C Ramírez	3	5

==== Section 4 ====
First round
7	(United States) Ryan Harrison	6^{5}	7^{10}	6
(Canada) Vasek Pospisil	7^{7}	6^{8}	4
(Croatia) Marin Draganja	4	5
Q	(Serbia) Filip Krajinović	6	7
(Japan) Hiroki Moriya	4	6	4
(Australia) Jared Easton	6	4	6
WC	(United Kingdom) Michael Thompson	1	2
10	(Germany) Cedrik-Marcel Stebe	6	6
13	(Belgium) David Goffin	7	1	3
(Australia) Andrew Thomas	5	6	6
(United Kingdom) Daniel Cox	6	4	6
LL	(Zimbabwe) Mbonisi Ndimande	2	6	2
(Thailand) Kittipong Wachiramanowong	6^{2}	4
WC	(Italy) Alessandro Giannessi	7^{7}	6
(Dominican Republic) José Hernández-Fernández	4	3
2	(Chinese Taipei) Yang Tsung-hua	6	6

Second round
7	(United States) R Harrison	5	3
Q	(Serbia) F Krajinović	7	6
(Australia) J Easton	6	4	8
10	(Germany) C-M Stebe	3	6	6
(Australia) A Thomas	2	6	9
(United Kingdom) D Cox	6	4	7
WC	(Italy) A Giannessi	6^{7}	2
2	(Chinese Taipei) T-h Yang	7^{9}	6

Third round
Q	(Serbia) F Krajinović	6	6
(Australia) J Easton	1	2
(Australia) A Thomas	6	6
2	(Chinese Taipei) T-h Yang	3	2

Quarterfinals
Q	(Serbia) F Krajinović	7^{7}	6
(Australia) A Thomas	6^{2}	4
