= 2008 US Open – Men's singles qualifying =

Men's singles qualifying
- 2008 US Open

Events
Singles	men	women		boys	girls
Doubles	men	women	mixed	boys	girls
WC Singles	men	women	quad
WC Doubles	men	women	quad
Legends	men	women	mixed

Qualification
Singles	men	women
- US Open

== Seeds ==
1. (Ukraine) Sergiy Stakhovsky (second round)
2. (South Africa) Kevin Anderson (first round)
3. (Germany) Benjamin Becker (first round)
4. (United States) Robert Kendrick (qualified)
5. (Argentina) Brian Dabul (qualifying competition)
6. (Germany) Philipp Petzschner (qualifying competition)
7. (Colombia) Alejandro Falla (first round)
8. (Czech Republic) Jan Hernych (qualified)
9. (Chile) Nicolás Massú (second round)
10. (Germany) Andreas Beck (qualified)
11. (Japan) Kei Nishikori (moved to Main Draw)
12. (Chile) Paul Capdeville (qualified)
13. (Denmark) Kristian Pless (second round)
14. (Japan) Go Soeda (first round)
15. (Luxembourg) Gilles Müller (qualified)
16. (Switzerland) Stéphane Bohli (qualified)
17. (Uruguay) Pablo Cuevas (qualified)
18. (Germany) Björn Phau (qualified)
19. (Brazil) Thiago Alves (qualified)
20. (France) Thierry Ascione (qualifying competition)
21. (Argentina) Leonardo Mayer (second round)
22. (Italy) Flavio Cipolla (qualifying competition, lucky loser)
23. (United States) Kevin Kim (qualifying competition)
24. (Germany) Simon Stadler (qualifying competition)
25. (Netherlands) Jesse Huta Galung (qualifying competition)
26. (Australia) Joseph Sirianni (first round)
27. (South Africa) Rik de Voest (qualified)
28. (Belgium) Xavier Malisse (first round)
29. (Serbia) Ilija Bozoljac (first round)
30. (Colombia) Santiago Giraldo (first round)
31. (Australia) Robert Smeets (qualified)
32. (Kazakhstan) Andrey Golubev (qualifying competition, lucky loser)

== Qualifiers ==
1. (Germany) Björn Phau
2. (Czech Republic) Jan Minář
3. (Australia) Robert Smeets
4. (United States) Robert Kendrick
5. (Czech Republic) Tomáš Zíb
6. (Brazil) Thiago Alves
7. (United States) Ryler DeHeart
8. (Czech Republic) Jan Hernych
9. (Portugal) Rui Machado
10. (Germany) Andreas Beck
11. (South Africa) Rik de Voest
12. (Chile) Paul Capdeville
13. (United States) Ryan Sweeting
14. (Uruguay) Pablo Cuevas
15. (Luxembourg) Gilles Müller
16. (Switzerland) Stéphane Bohli

== Lucky losers ==
1. (Italy) Flavio Cipolla
2. (Kazakhstan) Andrey Golubev
3. (Pakistan) Aisam-ul-Haq Qureshi

== Qualifying draw ==
Key

- Q = Qualifier
- WC = Wild card
- LL = Lucky loser
- Alt = Alternate
- ITF = ITF entry
- PR = Protected ranking
- SR = Special ranking
- SE = Special exempt
- JE = Junior exempt
- JR = Junior Accelerator Programme entrant
- CO = College Accelerator Programme entrant
- NG = Next Gen Accelerator Program entrant
- w/o = Walkover
- r = Retired
- d = Defaulted

=== First qualifier ===
First round
1	(Ukraine) Sergiy Stakhovsky	5	7	6
(Italy) Stefano Galvani	7	5	3
(Spain) David Marrero	7	3	5
WC	(Lithuania) Ričardas Berankis	5	6	7
WC	(United States) Jean-Yves Aubone	6	6
(Netherlands) Melle van Gemerden	4	1
(United States) Jesse Witten	3	4
18	(Germany) Björn Phau	6	6

Second round
1	(Ukraine) Sergiy Stakhovsky	6	4	4
WC	(Lithuania) Ričardas Berankis	1	6	6
WC	(United States) Jean-Yves Aubone	2	4
18	(Germany) Björn Phau	6	6

Qualifying competition
WC	(Lithuania) Ričardas Berankis	6	4	2
18	(Germany) Björn Phau	4	6	6

=== Second qualifier ===
First round
2	(South Africa) Kevin Anderson	6^{3}	4
(Ecuador) Giovanni Lapentti	7^{7}	6
WC	(United States) Tim Smyczek	3	2
(Czech Republic) Lukáš Rosol	6	6
(Czech Republic) Jan Minář	6	3	6
(France) Josselin Ouanna	3	6	2
(Dominican Republic) Víctor Estrella Burgos	6	6
28	(Belgium) Xavier Malisse	4	2

Second round
(Ecuador) Giovanni Lapentti	6	7^{7}
(Czech Republic) Lukáš Rosol	2	6^{1}
(Czech Republic) Jan Minář	3	6	6
(Dominican Republic) Víctor Estrella Burgos	6	2	2

Qualifying competition
(Ecuador) Giovanni Lapentti	6	5	6^{1}
(Czech Republic) Jan Minář	2	7	7^{7}

=== Third qualifier ===
First round
3	(Germany) Benjamin Becker	4	7	6^{6}
(Italy) Gianluca Naso	6	5	7^{8}
(Australia) Adam Feeney	6^{7}	4
(United States) Hugo Armando	7^{9}	6
(Netherlands) Matwé Middelkoop	2	7	6
(France) Jean-Christophe Faurel	6	5	4
(Russia) Mikhail Ledovskikh	6^{5}	2
31	(Australia) Robert Smeets	7^{7}	6

Second round
(Italy) Gianluca Naso	4	7	7^{7}
(United States) Hugo Armando	6	5	6^{4}
(Netherlands) Matwé Middelkoop	6	4	3
31	(Australia) Robert Smeets	2	6	6

Qualifying competition
(Italy) Gianluca Naso	3	6^{8}
31	(Australia) Robert Smeets	6	7^{10}

=== Fourth qualifier ===
First round
4	(United States) Robert Kendrick	7^{7}	4	6
(Serbia) Dušan Vemić	6^{4}	6	2
WC	(United States) Travis Helgeson	7^{7}	5	1
(Brazil) Caio Zampieri	6^{5}	7	6
(United States) Rajeev Ram	3	6	6^{3}
(Canada) Peter Polansky	6	2	7^{7}
(Czech Republic) Jaroslav Pospíšil	4	2
24	(Germany) Simon Stadler	6	6

Second round
4	(United States) Robert Kendrick	6	6
(Brazil) Caio Zampieri	4	2
(Canada) Peter Polansky	2	4
24	(Germany) Simon Stadler	6	6

Qualifying competition
4	(United States) Robert Kendrick	7^{7}	6
24	(Germany) Simon Stadler	6^{5}	3

=== Fifth qualifier ===
First round
5	(Argentina) Brian Dabul	6	3	6
(Spain) Carles Poch-Gradin	4	6	3
(Canada) Frédéric Niemeyer	4	4
(Sweden) Björn Rehnquist	6	6
(Czech Republic) Tomáš Zíb	7^{7}	6
(France) Sébastien de Chaunac	6^{5}	0
(United States) Michael Yani	6	6
30	(Colombia) Santiago Giraldo	4	2

Second round
5	(Argentina) Brian Dabul	4	6	6
(Sweden) Björn Rehnquist	6	1	3
(Czech Republic) Tomáš Zíb	6	7
(United States) Michael Yani	3	5

Qualifying competition
5	(Argentina) Brian Dabul	6^{2}	1
(Czech Republic) Tomáš Zíb	7^{7}	6

=== Sixth qualifier ===
First round
6	(Germany) Philipp Petzschner	3	6	7^{7}
(Italy) Andrea Stoppini	6	4	6^{3}
WC	(United States) Alex Clayton	4	2
(Slovakia) Karol Beck	6	6
WC	(United States) Bryan Koniecko	3	4
(Austria) Martin Fischer	6	6
(Germany) Matthias Bachinger	4	1
19	(Brazil) Thiago Alves	6	6

Second round
6	(Germany) Philipp Petzschner	6	6
(Slovakia) Karol Beck	4	3
(Austria) Martin Fischer	2	3
19	(Brazil) Thiago Alves	6	6

Qualifying competition
6	(Germany) Philipp Petzschner	3	6^{0}
19	(Brazil) Thiago Alves	6	7^{7}

=== Seventh qualifier ===
First round
7	(Colombia) Alejandro Falla	4	1
(Argentina) Diego Hartfield	6	6
(United Kingdom) Josh Goodall	6	6
(Spain) Miguel Ángel López Jaén	3	3
(United States) Nicholas Monroe	1	4
(United States) Ryler DeHeart	6	6
(South Korea) Jun Woong-sun	6	6
26	(Australia) Joseph Sirianni	3	4

Second round
(Argentina) Diego Hartfield	6	6
(United Kingdom) Josh Goodall	4	2
(United States) Ryler DeHeart	6	6^{4}	7
(South Korea) Jun Woong-sun	1	7^{7}	5

Qualifying competition
(Argentina) Diego Hartfield	6	5	6^{3}
(United States) Ryler DeHeart	4	7	7^{7}

=== Eighth qualifier ===
First round
8	(Czech Republic) Jan Hernych	7^{7}	6
(Chinese Taipei) Chen Ti	6^{2}	3
WC	(United States) Chase Buchanan	6	3	6^{6}
(Brazil) Ricardo Hocevar	1	6	7^{8}
(Brazil) Ricardo Mello	1	6	3
(Pakistan) Aisam-ul-Haq Qureshi	6	1	6
(Australia) Brydan Klein	2	2
21	(Argentina) Leonardo Mayer	6	6

Second round
8	(Czech Republic) Jan Hernych	6	6^{5}	6
(Brazil) Ricardo Hocevar	3	7^{7}	3
(Pakistan) Aisam-ul-Haq Qureshi	6	7^{11}
21	(Argentina) Leonardo Mayer	4	6^{9}

Qualifying competition
8	(Czech Republic) Jan Hernych	6	6
(Pakistan) Aisam-ul-Haq Qureshi	4	3

=== Ninth qualifier ===
First round
9	(Chile) Nicolás Massú	6	6
(Brazil) André Miele	2	3
(Portugal) Rui Machado	6	6
(United States) Eric Nunez	4	4
(United Kingdom) Alex Bogdanovic	6^{6}	4
(Slovakia) Lukáš Lacko	7^{8}	6
(Poland) Dawid Olejniczak	5	2
22	(Italy) Flavio Cipolla	7	6

Second round
9	(Chile) Nicolás Massú	2	6	3
(Portugal) Rui Machado	6	3	6
(Slovakia) Lukáš Lacko	6	4	1
22	(Italy) Flavio Cipolla	2	6	6

Qualifying competition
(Portugal) Rui Machado	7^{7}	6
22	(Italy) Flavio Cipolla	6^{5}	3

=== Tenth qualifier ===
First round
10	(Germany) Andreas Beck	6	7^{7}
(Germany) Benedikt Dorsch	3	6^{4}
(Turkey) Marsel İlhan	4	3
(Israel) Harel Levy	6	6
WC	(United States) Michael McClune	3	4
(Croatia) Franko Škugor	6	6
(Colombia) Michael Quintero	4	1
20	(France) Thierry Ascione	6	6

Second round
10	(Germany) Andreas Beck	7^{9}	1	6
(Israel) Harel Levy	6^{7}	6	3
(Croatia) Franko Škugor	6^{5}	1
20	(France) Thierry Ascione	7^{7}	6

Qualifying competition
10	(Germany) Andreas Beck	7^{7}	6
20	(France) Thierry Ascione	6^{5}	1

=== Eleventh qualifier ===
First round
Alt	(Romania) Cătălin-Ionuț Gârd	1	6	4
(United States) Todd Widom	6	4	6
(Sweden) Filip Prpic	6	6
PR	(Switzerland) Ivo Heuberger	1	4
(France) Édouard Roger-Vasselin	6	6
(Mexico) Santiago González	1	2
(Italy) Alberto Brizzi	3	3
27	(South Africa) Rik de Voest	6	6

Second round
(United States) Todd Widom	5	2
(Sweden) Filip Prpic	7	6
(France) Édouard Roger-Vasselin	6	3	4
27	(South Africa) Rik de Voest	4	6	6

Qualifying competition
(Sweden) Filip Prpic	1	2
27	(South Africa) Rik de Voest	6	6

=== Twelfth qualifier ===
First round
12	(Chile) Paul Capdeville	6	6
(France) Gary Lugassy	0	1
WC	(United States) Ryan Harrison	6	4	3
(Spain) Daniel Muñoz de la Nava	3	6	6
(United Kingdom) Alexander Slabinsky	4	3
(United States) K. J. Hippensteel	6	6
(Italy) Francesco Piccari	2	2
25	(Netherlands) Jesse Huta Galung	6	6

Second round
12	(Chile) Paul Capdeville	6	7^{7}
(Spain) Daniel Muñoz de la Nava	4	6^{5}
(United States) K. J. Hippensteel	2	1
25	(Netherlands) Jesse Huta Galung	6	6

Qualifying competition
12	(Chile) Paul Capdeville	7	7^{7}
25	(Netherlands) Jesse Huta Galung	5	6^{0}

=== Thirteenth qualifier ===
First round
13	(Denmark) Kristian Pless	6	6
(Romania) Adrian Ungur	3	3
(United States) Ryan Sweeting	6	6
(India) Prakash Amritraj	3	4
(Czech Republic) Lukáš Dlouhý	6	6^{5}	3
(Italy) Paolo Lorenzi	4	7^{7}	6
(Australia) Colin Ebelthite	4	4
23	(United States) Kevin Kim	6	6

Second round
13	(Denmark) Kristian Pless	3	4
(United States) Ryan Sweeting	6	6
(Italy) Paolo Lorenzi	6	3	2
23	(United States) Kevin Kim	2	6	6

Qualifying competition
(United States) Ryan Sweeting	2	6	6
23	(United States) Kevin Kim	6	3	2

=== Fourteenth qualifier ===
First round
14	(Japan) Go Soeda	6^{4}	6^{6}
(United States) Alex Kuznetsov	7^{7}	7^{8}
(South Africa) Izak van der Merwe	7^{7}	3	4
(France) Alexandre Sidorenko	6^{2}	6	6
(France) Nicolas Coutelot	2	6	6
(Austria) Alexander Peya	6	0	3
(United Kingdom) Richard Bloomfield	7^{7}	3	4
17	(Uruguay) Pablo Cuevas	6^{3}	6	6

Second round
(United States) Alex Kuznetsov	7^{9}	7^{7}
(France) Alexandre Sidorenko	6^{7}	6^{5}
(France) Nicolas Coutelot	3	5
17	(Uruguay) Pablo Cuevas	6	7

Qualifying competition
(United States) Alex Kuznetsov	3	6	4
17	(Uruguay) Pablo Cuevas	6	4	6

=== Fifteenth qualifier ===
First round
15	(Luxembourg) Gilles Müller	6^{9}	7^{8}	7
(Algeria) Lamine Ouahab	7^{11}	6^{6}	5
(France) Adrian Mannarino	7^{7}	6
(United States) Zack Fleishman	6^{2}	3
(Spain) Adrián Menéndez-Maceiras	6^{4}	4
(Australia) Sam Groth	7^{7}	6
(Germany) Tobias Kamke	7^{7}	2	6
29	(Serbia) Ilija Bozoljac	6^{5}	6	3

Second round
15	(Luxembourg) Gilles Müller	7^{7}	7
(France) Adrian Mannarino	6^{2}	5
(Australia) Sam Groth	4	5
(Germany) Tobias Kamke	6	7

Qualifying competition
15	(Luxembourg) Gilles Müller	6	4	6
(Germany) Tobias Kamke	3	6	2

=== Sixteenth qualifier ===
First round
16	(Switzerland) Stéphane Bohli	6	6
(Austria) Martin Slanar	3	1
(Slovakia) Ivo Klec	6^{4}	1
(Russia) Alexander Kudryavtsev	7^{7}	6
(Poland) Michał Przysiężny	5	6	7^{8}
(Germany) Daniel Brands	7	4	6^{6}
(Brazil) João Souza	2	4
32	(Kazakhstan) Andrey Golubev	6	6

Second round
16	(Switzerland) Stéphane Bohli	6	6
(Russia) Alexander Kudryavtsev	2	3
(Poland) Michał Przysiężny	5	6	4
32	(Kazakhstan) Andrey Golubev	7	2	6

Qualifying competition
16	(Switzerland) Stéphane Bohli	6	6
32	(Kazakhstan) Andrey Golubev	4	3
