= 2008 US Open – Women's singles qualifying =

Women's singles qualifying
- 2008 US Open

Events
Singles	men	women		boys	girls
Doubles	men	women	mixed	boys	girls
WC Singles	men	women	quad
WC Doubles	men	women	quad
Legends	men	women	mixed

Qualification
Singles	men	women
- US Open

This article displays the qualifying draw for the Women's Singles at the 2008 US Open.

== Seeds ==
1. (China) Yuan Meng (first round)
2. (France) Mathilde Johansson (qualifying competition)
3. (United States) Julie Ditty (first round)
4. (Russia) Anna Lapushchenkova (qualifying competition)
5. (Canada) Stéphanie Dubois (second round)
6. (Chinese Taipei) Hsieh Su-wei (qualified)
7. (Hungary) Melinda Czink (first round)
8. (France) Stéphanie Foretz (qualifying competition)
9. (Belarus) Anastasiya Yakimova (first round)
10. (Paraguay) Rossana de los Ríos (qualified)
11. (Kazakhstan) Yaroslava Shvedova (qualified)
12. (Israel) Tzipora Obziler (second round)
13. (Russia) Olga Puchkova (first round)
14. (Czech Republic) Renata Voráčová (first round)
15. (Romania) Raluca Olaru (qualified)
16. (Colombia) Mariana Duque (qualifying competition, lucky loser)
17. (Ukraine) Olga Savchuk (qualifying competition)
18. (Germany) Julia Schruff (qualifying competition)
19. (Russia) Vesna Manasieva (first round)
20. (Belgium) Kirsten Flipkens (second round)
21. (Czech Republic) Lucie Hradecká (qualifying competition)
22. (Portugal) Michelle Larcher de Brito (qualifying competition)
23. (Poland) Urszula Radwańska (second round)
24. (Italy) Maria Elena Camerin (qualified)
25. (United Kingdom) Elena Baltacha (qualifying competition)
26. (Germany) Kristina Barrois (qualifying competition)
27. (United Kingdom) Melanie South (qualifying competition)
28. (Japan) Ayumi Morita (first round)
29. (United Kingdom) Katie O'Brien (second round)
30. (Germany) Anna-Lena Grönefeld (qualified)
31. (Croatia) Jelena Pandžić (second round)
32. (Colombia) Catalina Castaño (first round)

== Qualifiers ==
1. (Czech Republic) Hana Šromová
2. (Russia) Anastasia Pivovarova
3. (Czech Republic) Sandra Záhlavová
4. (United States) Kristie Ahn
5. (China) Zhang Shuai
6. (Chinese Taipei) Hsieh Su-wei
7. (Switzerland) Stefanie Vögele
8. (Germany) Anna-Lena Grönefeld
9. (Italy) Roberta Vinci
10. (Paraguay) Rossana de los Ríos
11. (Kazakhstan) Yaroslava Shvedova
12. (United States) Shenay Perry
13. (France) Julie Coin
14. (United States) Alexa Glatch
15. (Romania) Raluca Olaru
16. (Italy) Maria Elena Camerin

== Lucky loser ==
1. (Colombia) Mariana Duque

== Qualifying draw ==
Key

- Q = Qualifier
- WC = Wild card
- LL = Lucky loser
- Alt = Alternate
- ITF = ITF entry
- PR = Protected ranking
- SR = Special ranking
- SE = Special exempt
- JE = Junior exempt
- JR = Junior Accelerator Programme entrant
- CO = College Accelerator Programme entrant
- NG = Next Gen Accelerator Program entrant
- w/o = Walkover
- r = Retired
- d = Defaulted

=== First qualifier ===
First round
1	(China) Yuan Meng	3	2
(Czech Republic) Hana Šromová	6	6
(South Korea) Lee Ye-ra	6	6
(United States) Julia Cohen	1	0
(Russia) Elena Bovina	6	6
(Australia) Monique Adamczak	1	0
(Russia) Alexandra Panova	6	6^{8}	1
18	(Germany) Julia Schruff	4	7^{10}	6

Second round
(Czech Republic) Hana Šromová	3	6	6
(South Korea) Lee Ye-ra	6	3	3
(Russia) Elena Bovina	6	3	1
18	(Germany) Julia Schruff	2	6	6

Qualifying competition
(Czech Republic) Hana Šromová	6	7
18	(Germany) Julia Schruff	3	5

=== Second qualifier ===
First round
2	(France) Mathilde Johansson	1	7^{7}	6
(United States) Raquel Kops-Jones	6	6^{4}	3
WC	(Slovakia) Kristína Kučová	1	6	6
(United Kingdom) Naomi Cavaday	6	3	1
(Ukraine) Oxana Lyubtsova	4	2
(Germany) Anne Schäfer	6	6
(Russia) Anastasia Pivovarova	6	7
28	(Japan) Ayumi Morita	1	5

Second round
2	(France) Mathilde Johansson	7	6
WC	(Slovakia) Kristína Kučová	5	3
(Germany) Anne Schäfer	2	4
(Russia) Anastasia Pivovarova	6	6

Qualifying competition
2	(France) Mathilde Johansson	5	1
(Russia) Anastasia Pivovarova	7	6

=== Third qualifier ===
First round
3	(United States) Julie Ditty	0	6	6^{3}
(Japan) Rika Fujiwara	6	4	7^{7}
(Argentina) Soledad Esperón	6	6
(United States) Sunitha Rao	3	4
(Slovenia) Polona Hercog	3	3
(Czech Republic) Sandra Záhlavová	6	6
(Japan) Junri Namigata	6^{4}	3
20	(Belgium) Kirsten Flipkens	7^{7}	6

Second round
(Japan) Rika Fujiwara	6	4	7^{8}
(Argentina) Soledad Esperón	4	6	6^{6}
(Czech Republic) Sandra Záhlavová	6	7^{7}
20	(Belgium) Kirsten Flipkens	4	6^{2}

Qualifying competition
(Japan) Rika Fujiwara	6	3	4
(Czech Republic) Sandra Záhlavová	2	6	6

=== Fourth qualifier ===
First round
4	(Russia) Anna Lapushchenkova	7^{7}	6
(Ukraine) Yuliana Fedak	6^{3}	3
(Slovakia) Jarmila Gajdošová	6	6
(Russia) Maria Kondratieva	1	2
(Ukraine) Yevgenia Savranska	3	2
WC	(United States) Kristie Ahn	6	6
(Japan) Akiko Yonemura	6	3	3
31	(Croatia) Jelena Pandžić	4	6	6

Second round
4	(Russia) Anna Lapushchenkova	6	6
(Slovakia) Jarmila Gajdošová	3	2
WC	(United States) Kristie Ahn	6	6
31	(Croatia) Jelena Pandžić	1	3

Qualifying competition
4	(Russia) Anna Lapushchenkova	4	4
WC	(United States) Kristie Ahn	6	6

=== Fifth qualifier ===
First round
5	(Canada) Stéphanie Dubois	6	4	6
(Czech Republic) Eva Hrdinová	1	6	3
(China) Zhang Shuai	6	4	6
(Argentina) Jorgelina Cravero	4	6	2
(Mexico) Melissa Torres Sandoval	1	3
(France) Youlia Fedossova	6	6
(Italy) Alberta Brianti	2	6	3
27	(United Kingdom) Melanie South	6	3	6

Second round
5	(Canada) Stéphanie Dubois	6	4	4
(China) Zhang Shuai	4	6	6
(France) Youlia Fedossova	3	6	6^{6}
27	(United Kingdom) Melanie South	6	4	7^{8}

Qualifying competition
(China) Zhang Shuai	7^{7}	6
27	(United Kingdom) Melanie South	6^{2}	2

=== Sixth qualifier ===
First round
6	(Chinese Taipei) Hsieh Su-wei	6	6
(Spain) Sílvia Soler Espinosa	0	4
WC	(United States) Madison Brengle	6	5	7^{7}
(Serbia) Ana Jovanović	1	7	6^{5}
(Russia) Alina Jidkova	6	4	2
(United States) Audra Cohen	4	6	6
(Russia) Arina Rodionova	2	0
26	(Germany) Kristina Barrois	6	6

Second round
6	(Chinese Taipei) Hsieh Su-wei	6	6
WC	(United States) Madison Brengle	4	3
(United States) Audra Cohen	2	4
26	(Germany) Kristina Barrois	6	6

Qualifying competition
6	(Chinese Taipei) Hsieh Su-wei	6	6
26	(Germany) Kristina Barrois	4	1

=== Seventh qualifier ===
First round
7	(Hungary) Melinda Czink	3	5
WC	(United States) Sloane Stephens	6	7
(Hungary) Gréta Arn	2	7^{7}	1
(Switzerland) Stefanie Vögele	6	6^{3}	6
(United States) Lauren Albanese	6	2	6
WC	(United States) Kimberly Couts	4	6	3
(Russia) Ekaterina Ivanova	3	1
21	(Czech Republic) Lucie Hradecká	6	6

Second round
WC	(United States) Sloane Stephens	1	3
(Switzerland) Stefanie Vögele	6	6
(United States) Lauren Albanese	3	6	2
21	(Czech Republic) Lucie Hradecká	6	0	6

Qualifying competition
(Switzerland) Stefanie Vögele	7^{7}	6
21	(Czech Republic) Lucie Hradecká	6^{4}	2

=== Eighth qualifier ===
First round
8	(France) Stéphanie Foretz	2	7	6
(Japan) Kumiko Iijima	6	5	3
(France) Irena Pavlovic	1	6	6
(Japan) Erika Takao	6	2	4
(Russia) Regina Kulikova	6	6
(Ukraine) Tetiana Luzhanska	1	2
(Germany) Kathrin Wörle	3	3
30	(Germany) Anna-Lena Grönefeld	6	6

Second round
8	(France) Stéphanie Foretz	6	3	6
(France) Irena Pavlovic	3	6	3
(Russia) Regina Kulikova	4	2
30	(Germany) Anna-Lena Grönefeld	6	6

Qualifying competition
8	(France) Stéphanie Foretz	2	4
30	(Germany) Anna-Lena Grönefeld	6	6

=== Ninth qualifier ===
First round
9	(Belarus) Anastasiya Yakimova	3	3
(Portugal) Neuza Silva	6	6
(South Africa) Natalie Grandin	6	6
(Croatia) Ana Vrljić	3	1
(Italy) Roberta Vinci	6	6
(Spain) Estrella Cabeza Candela	3	3
(Slovenia) Maša Zec Peškirič	0	2
23	(Poland) Urszula Radwańska	6	6

Second round
(Portugal) Neuza Silva	3	6	6
(South Africa) Natalie Grandin	6	4	4
(Italy) Roberta Vinci	6	6
23	(Poland) Urszula Radwańska	4	4

Qualifying competition
(Portugal) Neuza Silva	4	0
(Italy) Roberta Vinci	6	6

=== Tenth qualifier ===
First round
10	(Paraguay) Rossana de los Ríos	6^{6}	6	6
(Romania) Liana Ungur	7^{8}	1	3
PR	(Czech Republic) Eva Birnerová	4	3
(Czech Republic) Zuzana Ondrášková	6	6
(Japan) Tomoko Yonemura	6	6
(Slovakia) Zuzana Kučová	2	4
(Belarus) Ekaterina Dzehalevich	6	4	6
32	(Colombia) Catalina Castaño	4	6	2

Second round
10	(Paraguay) Rossana de los Ríos	6	6
(Czech Republic) Zuzana Ondrášková	4	1
(Japan) Tomoko Yonemura	6	2	0
(Belarus) Ekaterina Dzehalevich	4	6	6

Qualifying competition
10	(Paraguay) Rossana de los Ríos	3	7	6
(Belarus) Ekaterina Dzehalevich	6	5	4

=== Eleventh qualifier ===
First round
11	(Kazakhstan) Yaroslava Shvedova	6^{3}	6
(Italy) Corinna Dentoni	7^{7}	2^{r}
(United States) Alexandra Stevenson	7	3	5
(Chinese Taipei) Chan Chin-wei	5	6	7
(Sweden) Johanna Larsson	6	6
(Brazil) Maria-Fernanda Alves	4	3
(South Africa) Chanelle Scheepers	6	6
19	(Russia) Vesna Manasieva	4	3

Second round
11	(Kazakhstan) Yaroslava Shvedova	6	6
(Chinese Taipei) Chan Chin-wei	2	2
(Sweden) Johanna Larsson	6	6
(South Africa) Chanelle Scheepers	4	4

Qualifying competition
11	(Kazakhstan) Yaroslava Shvedova	6	6
(Sweden) Johanna Larsson	1	2

=== Twelfth qualifier ===
First round
12	(Israel) Tzipora Obziler	6	6
(China) Lu Jingjing	1	1
(Germany) Angelique Kerber	2	3
WC	(United States) Shenay Perry	6	6
(Georgia (country)) Margalita Chakhnashvili	7	6^{3}	3
(United States) Varvara Lepchenko	5	7^{7}	6
WC	(United States) Christina McHale	4	1
17	(Ukraine) Olga Savchuk	6	6

Second round
12	(Israel) Tzipora Obziler	4	4
WC	(United States) Shenay Perry	6	6
(United States) Varvara Lepchenko	3	2
17	(Ukraine) Olga Savchuk	6	6

Qualifying competition
WC	(United States) Shenay Perry	6	7^{7}
17	(Ukraine) Olga Savchuk	4	6^{4}

=== Thirteenth qualifier ===
First round
13	(Russia) Olga Puchkova	4	3
(Bulgaria) Sesil Karatantcheva	6	6
WC	(United States) Amanda McDowell	1	1
(France) Julie Coin	6	6
(Estonia) Margit Rüütel	6	2	6^{4}
(United States) Carly Gullickson	4	6	7^{7}
(Poland) Anna Korzeniak	6^{7}	7	0
25	(United Kingdom) Elena Baltacha	7^{9}	5	6

Second round
(Bulgaria) Sesil Karatantcheva	3	7^{7}	3
(France) Julie Coin	6	6^{4}	6
(United States) Carly Gullickson	1	7^{7}	2
25	(United Kingdom) Elena Baltacha	6	6^{2}	6

Qualifying competition
(France) Julie Coin	7	2	7^{7}
25	(United Kingdom) Elena Baltacha	5	6	6^{4}

=== Fourteenth qualifier ===
First round
14	(Czech Republic) Renata Voráčová	3	1
(Belarus) Tatiana Poutchek	6	6
WC	(United States) Julia Boserup	4	2
(Russia) Nina Bratchikova	6	6
(Argentina) Betina Jozami	5	3
(United States) Alexa Glatch	7	6
(Croatia) Petra Martić	6	4	0
29	(United Kingdom) Katie O'Brien	3	6	6

Second round
(Belarus) Tatiana Poutchek	6	6^{3}	2
(Russia) Nina Bratchikova	1	7^{7}	6
(United States) Alexa Glatch	6	6
29	(United Kingdom) Katie O'Brien	3	4

Qualifying competition
(Russia) Nina Bratchikova	3	6	2
(United States) Alexa Glatch	6	3	6

=== Fifteenth qualifier ===
First round
15	(Romania) Raluca Olaru	6	6
(Bosnia and Herzegovina) Sandra Martinović	4	4
(Croatia) Nika Ožegović	2	1
(Canada) Marie-Ève Pelletier	6	6
(United States) Abigail Spears	6	6
(Croatia) Karolina Šprem	4	4
(United States) Angela Haynes	6	5	4
22	(Portugal) Michelle Larcher de Brito	3	7	6

Second round
15	(Romania) Raluca Olaru	5	7	6
(Canada) Marie-Ève Pelletier	7	5	3
(United States) Abigail Spears	2	5
22	(Portugal) Michelle Larcher de Brito	6	7

Qualifying competition
15	(Romania) Raluca Olaru	6	6
22	(Portugal) Michelle Larcher de Brito	2	3

=== Sixteenth qualifier ===
First round
16	(Colombia) Mariana Duque	6	1	6
(Hungary) Kira Nagy	3	6	2
(Croatia) Sanda Mamić	6	2	7^{7}
(Australia) Sophie Ferguson	1	6	6^{5}
(Georgia (country)) Anna Tatishvili	4	1
(United States) Lilia Osterloh	6	6
(Kyrgyzstan) Ksenia Palkina	6^{7}	7^{7}	2
24	(Italy) Maria Elena Camerin	7^{9}	6^{5}	6

Second round
16	(Colombia) Mariana Duque	3	6	6
(Croatia) Sanda Mamić	6	2	2
(United States) Lilia Osterloh	2	4
24	(Italy) Maria Elena Camerin	6	6

Qualifying competition
16	(Colombia) Mariana Duque	6	4	2
24	(Italy) Maria Elena Camerin	4	6	6
