= Sandra Roma =

Swedish tennis player

- Country (sports): Sweden
- Born: 31 March 1990 (age 34); Stockholm, Sweden
- Plays: Left-handed (two-handed backhand)
- Prize money: $27,321

Singles
- Career record: 60–42
- Career titles: 3 ITF
- Highest ranking: No. 431 (15 April 2013)

Grand Slam singles results
- Australian Open Junior: 1R (2007)
- French Open Junior: Q1 (2007)
- Wimbledon Junior: 1R (2007)
- US Open Junior: 2R (2008)

Doubles
- Career record: 39–27
- Career titles: 5 ITF
- Highest ranking: No. 416 (16 November 2009)

Grand Slam doubles results
- Australian Open Junior: 2R (2007)
- French Open Junior: 2R (2007)
- Wimbledon Junior: SF (2007)
- US Open Junior: W (2008)

Team competitions
- Fed Cup: 2–0

Sandra Roma (born 31 March 1990) is a former tennis player from Sweden.

In her career, she won three singles and five doubles titles on the ITF Circuit. On 15 April 2013, she reached her best singles ranking of world No. 431. On 16 November 2009, she peaked at No. 416 in the doubles rankings.

== Career ==
Roma reached a career-high ranking in juniors of 11 in September 2008. Alongside Nikola Hofmanova, she reached the semifinals of the doubles draw of the Wimbledon Championships in 2007. She teamed up with Noppawan Lertcheewakarn and reached the final of the 2008 US Open competition in girls' doubles, as the third seeds; they won against Mallory Burdette and Sloane Stephens.

In May 2009, Roma reached her first senior women's final where she lost to Amanda Carreras. She won her first professional title in Tampere, beating talented junior Anna Orlik in the final.

=== Comeback from injury 2011 ===
Roma had surgery on her back in the Autumn of 2009, and returned to match play in November 2010 playing team tennis for her homeclub of SALK. In her first match back she defeated Camilla Lundberg in straight sets.

Roma made her ITF Circuit comeback in Tallinn, where she qualified and lost in the first round of the main draw. Another loss followed to Mona Barthel at Roma's home tournament in Stockholm. Roma then won four matches in qualifying for the main draw in Antalya, where she was knocked out in the second round. The following week, she again qualified by winning four matches.

=== Fed Cup ===
Roma has represented Sweden in the Fed Cup twice. She won both matches, partnering Ellen Allgurin against Romania in 2009, and playing in another doubles match, partnering Anna Brazhnikova against Switzerland in 2011.

== ITF finals ==
=== Singles (3–2) ===
Legend $25,000 tournaments $10,000 tournaments	Finals by surface Hard (1–1) Clay (2–1)

Outcome	No.	Date	Location	Surface	Opponent	Score
Runner-up	1.	23 May 2009	Antalya, Turkey	Clay	(United Kingdom) Amanda Carreras	6–7^{(7)}, 7–6^{(2)}, 4–6
Winner	1.	2 August 2009	Tampere, Finland	Clay	(Belarus) Anna Orlik	6–7^{(2)}, 7–6^{(3)}, 6–4
Runner-up	2.	7 July 2012	Istanbul, Turkey	Hard	(Turkey) Melis Sezer	6–7^{(5)}, 4–6
Winner	2.	29 July 2012	Tampere, Finland	Clay	(Russia) Alena Tarasova	7–5, 6–2
Winner	3.	28 October 2012	Stockholm, Sweden	Hard (i)	(United Kingdom) Emily Webley-Smith	6–2, 6–1

=== Doubles (5–2) ===
Legend $25,000 tournaments $15,000 tournaments $10,000 tournaments	Finals by surface Hard (1–0) Clay (4–2)

Outcome	No.	Date	Location	Surface	Partner	Opponents	Score
Runner-up	1.	22 May 2009	Antalya, Turkey	Clay	(Sweden) Julia Klackenberg	(United Kingdom) Amanda Carreras (Italy) Valentina Sulpizio	0–6, 3–6
Runner-up	2.	26 June 2009	Kristinehamn, Sweden	Clay	(Sweden) Sofia Arvidsson	(Denmark) Hanne Skak Jensen (Sweden) Johanna Larsson	6–7^{(5)}, 2–6
Winner	1.	2 July 2009	Ystad, Sweden	Clay	(Sweden) Sofia Arvidsson	(Austria) Melanie Klaffner (Sweden) Hanna Nooni	6–4, 6–4
Winner	2.	1 August 2009	Tampere, Finland	Clay	(Finland) Emma Laine	(France) Alizé Lim (Italy) Vivienne Vierin	6–4, 6–3
Winner	3.	12 May 2012	Båstad, Sweden	Clay	(Sweden) Eveliina Virtanen	(Sweden) Hilda Melander (Sweden) Paulina Milosavljevic	6–2, 3–6, [10–7]
Winner	4.	19 May 2012	Båstad, Sweden	Clay	(Sweden) Eveliina Virtanen	(United Kingdom) Lucy Brown (Serbia) Milana Špremo	6–3, 6–7^{(4)}, [10–6]
Winner	5.	23 March 2013	Sunderland, UK	Hard (i)	(Sweden) Hilda Melander	(Republic of Ireland) Amy Bowtell (United Kingdom) Lucy Brown	6–0, 6–3
