= Porto Alegre Junior Championships =

Tournament information
- Founded: 1978 (Copa Gerdau in 1984)
- Location: Porto Alegre; Brazil
- Venue: Associação Leopoldina Juvenil and Sogipa
- Category: ITF Junior Grade A (2007–current)
- Surface: Red clay – outdoors
- Draw: 64S / 64Q / 32D (Boys); 64S / 48Q / 32D (Girls)
- Website: www.campeonatointernacional.com.br

The Porto Alegre Junior Championships (Portuguese: Campeonato Internacional Juvenil de Tênis de Porto Alegre), also known as the Copa Gerdau, is a prestigious junior tennis tournament played on outdoor red clay courts in Porto Alegre, Brazil. The tournament is held annually in late February or early March. It is one of five Grade A tournaments, the junior equivalent of ATP Masters or WTA Premier Mandatory events in terms of rankings points allocated.

== History ==
The Copa Gerdau was founded in 1984, and has hosted international players since 1987. It has been a Grade A event since 2007. Before this event was promoted to Grade A, Brazil's Banana Bowl tournament had held that distinction since 1998. The original venue for the Grade A tournament was the International Championships of Venezuela, which was founded in 1978 and held in Caracas.

== Singles champions ==
Year	Boys	Girls
↓ International Championships of Venezuela ↓
1978	(Argentina) Alejandro Ganzábal	(Argentina) Claudia Casabianca
1979	(Ecuador) Raúl Viver	(Brazil) Cláudia Monteiro
1980	(Argentina) Roberto Argüello	(Argentina) Graciela Perez
1981	(Brazil) Eduardo Oncins	(Czech Republic) Helena Suková
1982	(Spain) Martín Jaite	(Sweden) Helena Olsson
1983	(United States) Bill Stanley	(Brazil) Silvana Campos
1984	(Austria) Thomas Muster	(Brazil) Silvana Campos
1985	(Argentina) Franco Davín	(Argentina) Patricia Tarabini
1986	(Austria) Gilbert Schaller	(Brazil) Gisele Miró
1987	(Peru) Alejandro Aramburú	(West Germany) Tanja Weigl
1988	(Venezuela) Nicolás Pereira	(Uruguay) Patricia Miller
1989	(Finland) Aki Rahunen	(Argentina) Florencia Labat
1990	(Czechoslovakia) Pavel Gazda	(Czechoslovakia) Radka Bobková
1991	(Argentina) Juan Garat	(Brazil) Eugenia Maia
1992	(Chile) Gabriel Silberstein	(Romania) Cătălina Cristea
1993	(Romania) Răzvan Sabău	(Georgia (country)) Nino Louarsabishvili
1994	(Brazil) Gustavo Kuerten	(Slovakia) Henrieta Nagyová
1995	(Slovakia) Tomáš Čatár	(Poland) Aleksandra Olsza
1996	(United States) Rodolfo Rake	(United States) Jessica Lehnhoff
1997	(France) Julien Jeanpierre	(United States) Melissa Middleton
↓ Banana Bowl ↓
1998	(Chile) Fernando González	(Argentina) Erica Krauth
1999	(France) Paul-Henri Mathieu	(Hungary) Anikó Kapros
2000	(United States) Andy Roddick	(Argentina) María Emilia Salerni
2001	(Luxembourg) Gilles Müller	(Russia) Svetlana Kuznetsova
2002	(Cyprus) Marcos Baghdatis	(Switzerland) Myriam Casanova
2003	(United Kingdom) David Brewer	(Russia) Alisa Kleybanova
2004	(Argentina) Eduardo Schwank	(Russia) Alisa Kleybanova
2005	(Argentina) Leonardo Mayer	(Canada) Sharon Fichman
2006	(Spain) Albert Ramos Viñolas	(France) Alizé Cornet
↓ Copa Gerdau ↓
2007	(Belarus) Uladzimir Ignatic	(France) Cindy Chala
2008	(Brazil) José Pereira	(Romania) Elena Bogdan
2009	(Brazil) José Pereira	(Croatia) Silvia Njirić
2010	(France) Mathias Bourgue	(Puerto Rico) Monica Puig
2011	(Brazil) Thiago Monteiro	(Canada) Eugenie Bouchard
2012	(France) Mathias Bourgue	(Kazakhstan) Anna Danilina
2013	(Italy) Gianluigi Quinzi	(Russia) Varvara Flink
2014	(Brazil) Orlando Luz	(Switzerland) Jil Teichmann
2015	(Brazil) Orlando Luz	(United States) Usue Maitane Arconada
2016	(Japan) Yosuke Watanuki	(United States) Usue Maitane Arconada
2017	(United States) Trent Bryde	(United States) Amanda Anisimova
2018	(Argentina) Sebastián Báez	(Canada) Leylah Annie Fernandez
2019	(Spain) Nicolás Álvarez Varona	(Spain) Ane Mintegi del Olmo
2020	(Italy) Luciano Darderi	(United States) Elvina Kalieva
2021	(Sweden) Leo Borg	(France) Océane Babel
2022	(United States) Nishesh Basavareddy	(Czech Republic) Lucie Havlíčková
2023	(United States) Darwin Blanch	(Japan) Mayu Crossley
2024	(South Korea) Hoyoung Roh	(United States) Kaitlyn Rolls
2025	(United States) Noah Johnston	(United States) Thea Frodin
2026	(Brazil) Pedro Henrique Chabalgoity	(Brazil) Nauhany Vitória Leme da Silva

== Doubles champions ==
Year	Boys	Girls
1998	(Czech Republic) Tomáš Cakl (Czech Republic) Jiří Vrbka	(Argentina) Clarisa Fernández (Argentina) María Emilia Salerni
1999	(Venezuela) José de Armas (Mexico) Daniel Langre	(Argentina) Eugenia Chialvo (Argentina) Erica Krauth
2000	(United Kingdom) Lee Childs (United Kingdom) James Nelson	(Argentina) Eugenia Chialvo (Argentina) María Emilia Salerni
2001	(Colombia) Alejandro Falla (Colombia) Carlos Salamanca	(Czech Republic) Petra Cetkovská (Czech Republic) Barbora Strýcová
2002	(Portugal) Fred Gil (Portugal) Leonardo Tavares	(Switzerland) Myriam Casanova (Belgium) Elke Clijsters
2003	(Portugal) Fred Gil (United States) Chris Kwon	(Brazil) Larissa Carvalho (Argentina) Soledad Esperón
2004	(Slovakia) Lukáš Lacko (Slovakia) Peter Miklušičák	(Russia) Alisa Kleybanova (Russia) Irina Kotkina
2005	(Venezuela) Piero Luisi (Venezuela) David Navarrete	(Romania) Bianca Ioana Bonifate (Canada) Sharon Fichman
2006	(United States) Jamie Hunt (United States) Nathaniel Schnugg	(Slovakia) Klaudia Boczová (Slovakia) Kristína Kučová
↓ Copa Gerdau ↓
2007	(United Kingdom) Daniel Cox (United Kingdom) David Rice	(Argentina) Tatiana Búa (Brazil) Roxane Vaisemberg
2008	(France) Axel Michon (France) Guillaume Rufin	(France) Kristina Mladenovic (Ukraine) Maryna Zanevska
2009	(Sweden) Patrik Brydolf (Austria) Tristan-Samuel Weissborn	(France) Kristina Mladenovic (Croatia) Silvia Njirić
2010	(Slovakia) Filip Horanský (Slovakia) Jozef Kovalík	(Slovakia) Jana Čepelová (Slovakia) Vivien Juhászová
2011	(Mexico) Marco Aurelio Núñez (Japan) Kaichi Uchida	(Ecuador) Doménica González (Paraguay) Montserrat González
2012	(United Kingdom) Luke Bambridge (United Kingdom) Joshua Ward-Hibbert	(Kazakhstan) Anna Danilina (Poland) Zuzanna Maciejewska
2013	(Brazil) Orlando Luz (Brazil) Marcelo Zormann	(Mexico) Alejandra Cisneros (Mexico) Victoria Rodríguez
2014	(France) Quentin Halys (France) Johan Tatlot	(Australia) Priscilla Hon (Switzerland) Jil Teichmann
2015	(Portugal) Felipe Cunha e Silva (Canada) Alejandro Tabilo	(United States) Francesca Di Lorenzo (Brazil) Luisa Stefani
2016	(United States) Brian Cernoch (United States) Vasil Kirkov	(Hungary) Panna Udvardy (Ukraine) Dayana Yastremska
2017	(United States) Alafia Ayeni (United States) Trent Bryde	(Mexico) María José Portillo Ramírez (United States) Sofia Sewing
2018	(Argentina) Sebastián Báez (France) Clément Tabur	(Denmark) Clara Tauson (Russia) Anastasia Tikhonova
2019	(Japan) Shunsuke Mitsui (Japan) Keisuke Saitoh	(Japan) Natsumi Kawaguchi (Israel) Shavit Kimchi
2020	(Italy) Luciano Darderi (Brazil) Gustavo Heide	(Argentina) Ana Geller (Uruguay) Guillermina Grant
2021	(United States) Alexander Bernard (United States) Dali Blanch	(Russia) Kira Pavlova (Russia) Diana Shnaider
2022	(United States) Aidan Kim (United States) Cooper Williams	(Slovakia) Irina Balus (Slovakia) Nikola Daubnerová
2023	(Italy) Federico Cinà (Japan) Rei Sakamoto	(Italy) Francesca Gandolfi (Italy) Greta Greco Lucchina
2024	(Colombia) Miguel Tobón (Argentina) Máximo Zeitune	(Brazil) Olivia Carneiro (Belgium) Jeline Vandromme
2025	(United States) Ronit Karki (United States) Jack Satterfield	(Brazil) Victoria Luiza Barros (Bulgaria) Yoana Konstantinova
2026	(Latvia) Rihards Neimanis (Kazakhstan) Daniel Tazabekov	(Argentina) Sol Ailin Larraya Guidi (Brazil) Naná Silva
