= Jelena Pandžić =

Croatian tennis player (born 1983)

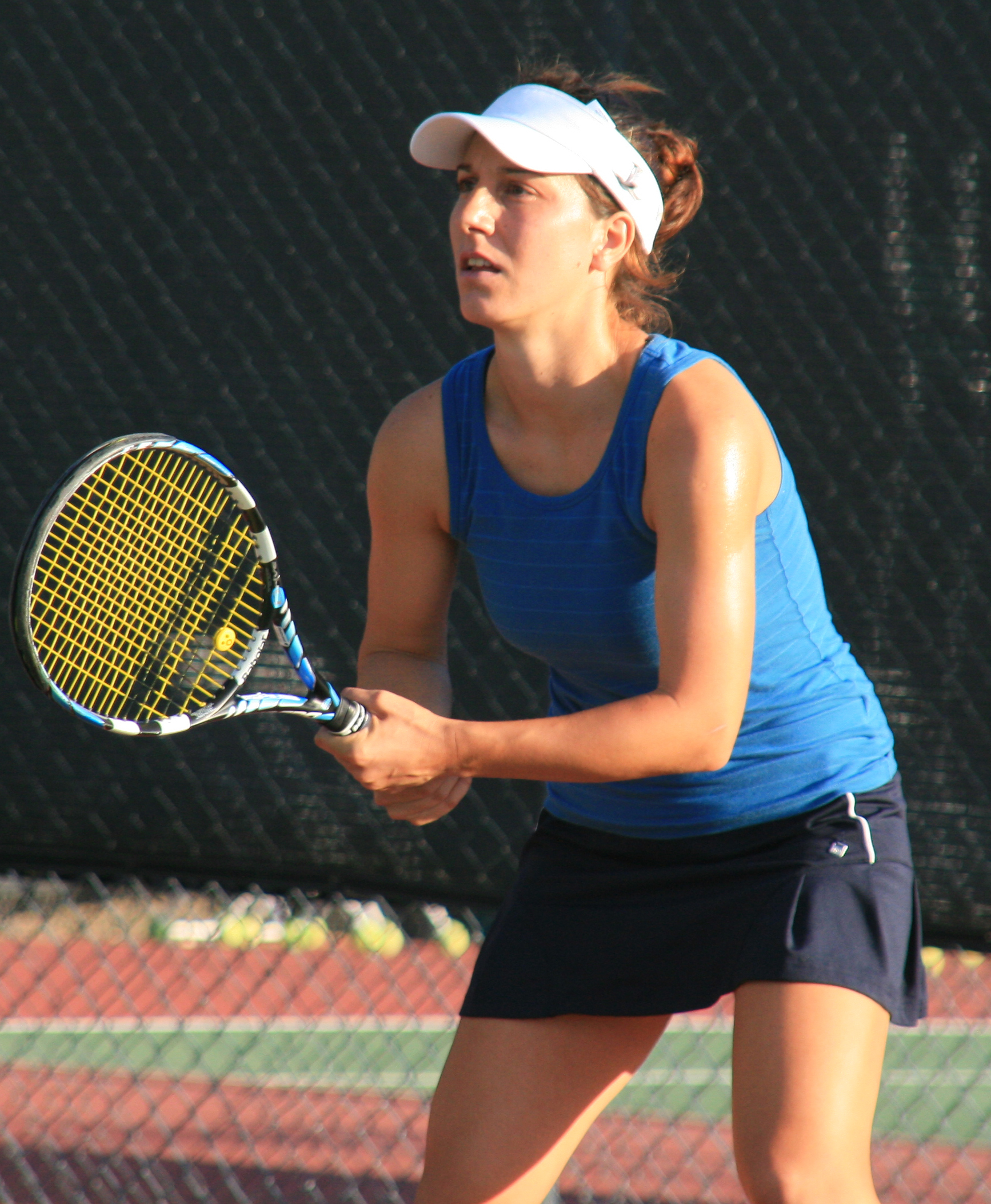
- Country (sports): Croatia
- Residence: Leverkusen, Germany
- Born: 17 March 1983 (age 42) Split, Croatia (then Yugoslavia)
- Height: 1.70 m (5 ft 7 in)
- Turned pro: 1999
- Retired: 2017
- Plays: Right (two-handed backhand)
- Prize money: $134,550

Singles
- Career record: 234–116
- Career titles: 11 ITF
- Highest ranking: No. 136 (22 September 2008)

Grand Slam singles results
- Australian Open: Q1 (2009)
- French Open: 2R (2008)
- Wimbledon: Q1 (2008)
- US Open: Q2 (2008, 2010)

Doubles
- Career record: 50–30
- Career titles: 5 ITF
- Highest ranking: No. 226 (13 October 2008)

Jelena Pandžić (Croatian pronunciation: [jělena pâːndʒitɕ]; born 17 March, 1983) is a retired tennis player from Croatia.

== Tennis career ==
She began playing tennis at the age of seven and was considered a very promising junior player, achieving a world No. 1 ranking in the under-14 category. In the mid-1990s, she was spotted by Nick Bollettieri who personally coached her for a time.

=== 1999–2002 ===
Pandžić's first senior tournament on the ITF Circuit was in April 1999 where she qualified and reached the quarterfinals of the Makarska $10k tournament. By 2002, she had made some progress up the rankings, winning three ITF singles titles, but had not yet fulfilled her initial promise. Her highest ranking was 374, achieved in October 2002.

=== 2003–2006 ===
In 2003, Pandžić only played one game of tennis before a car crash put her out of action. Over the next few years, she did not play in any professional ranking tournaments. Instead, she attended university in the USA and played on the college tennis circuit, representing Fresno Pacific University.

=== 2007 ===
In May 2007, Pandžić once more began playing on the professional circuit, and this time she began to put together an impressive string of results. Despite beginning with no ranking and having to qualify for the lowest tier of events, she reached a year-end ranking of 255, having won four of the 13 tournaments she entered.

=== 2008–2009 ===
Although she began 2008 with three first-round losses, Pandžić continued her climb-up the rankings. Her first appearance in the main draw of a WTA Tour event came when she qualified for the Prague Open. However, she lost in the first round to Melinda Czink.

In May 2008, with a ranking of 189, she was able to enter the qualifying rounds of the French Open. With wins over Eva Hrdinová, Julie Coin and Monica Niculescu, Pandžić managed to qualify for the main draw of a Grand Slam tournament for the first time in her career. She then won her first-round match against Séverine Brémond in three sets, but was beaten heavily, 6–2, 6–0, in the second round by Agnieszka Radwańska, the 14th seed.

As well as the WTA and ITF events, Pandžić also plays for professional teams in both Germany and the USA. She then was part of the St. Louis Aces team for the 2008 World TeamTennis league, alongside Anna Kournikova and Andy Roddick.

The end of 2008 saw Pandžić losing repeatedly in first rounds, and this continued through January 2009, when she disclosed she has been playing with a calf injury for some time, and was not sure if she will be able to continue playing professional tennis.

=== 2010 ===
At the end of May 2010, Pandžić started her second comeback by qualifying for and winning a $10k event in Sumter, South Carolina. In addition to playing well in a number of other ITF events, she has used her protected ranking of 136 to enter some WTA tournaments as well, losing tight matches to high ranked players. In a time of just over three months, she has accumulated 50 points and a record of 16–5 and is ranked 548 as of early August. She entered the qualifying of the US Open beating Sarah Gronert in the first round before losing to Alexandra Panova, 2–6, 3–6 in the second.

== ITF Circuit finals ==
Legend
$100,000 tournaments
$75,000 tournaments
$50,000 tournaments
$25,000 tournaments
$15,000 tournaments
$10,000 tournaments

=== Singles: 16 (11–5) ===
Result	No.	Date	Tournament	Surface	Opponent	Score
Loss	1.	21 August 2000	ITF Westende, Belgium	Clay	(Germany) Lisa Fritz	2–6, 6–3, 4–6
Loss	2.	26 March 2001	ITF Amiens, France	Clay	(France) Sophie Erre	7–6, 3–6, 6–7
Win	3.	15 October 2001	ITF Makarska, Croatia	Clay	(Croatia) Petra Dizdar	1–6, 7–5, 6–1
Win	4.	11 March 2002	ITF Makarska, Croatia	Clay	(Czech Republic) Libuše Průšová	6–1, 2–6, 7–6
Win	5.	26 August 2002	ITF Spoleto, Italy	Clay	(New Zealand) Shelley Stephens	7–5, 6–1
Loss	6.	3 June 2007	ITF Houston, United States	Hard (i)	(United States) Asia Muhammad	3–6, 6–4, 4–6
Win	7.	19 June 2007	ITF Fort Worth, United States	Hard	(United States) Lauren Embree	6–4, 6–1
Win	8.	26 June 2007	ITF Edmond, United States	Hard	(Venezuela) Gabriela Paz	3–6, 6–1, 6–4
Win	9.	17 July 2007	ITF Wichita, United States	Hard	(Venezuela) Gabriela Paz	6–4, 6–4
Win	10.	31 July 2007	ITF St. Joseph, United States	Hard	(United States) Stacia Fonseca	6–3, 6–1
Win	11.	24 May 2010	ITF Sumter, United States	Hard	(United States) Alexis King	6–2, 1–6, 6–2
Loss	12.	13 September 2010	ITF Redding, United States	Hard	(United States) Jamie Hampton	6–3, 1–6, 4–6
Loss	13.	18 June 2012	ITF Cologne, Germany	Clay	(Germany) Julia Kimmelmann	2–6, 6–1, 5–7
Win	14.	13 August 2012	ITF Brčko, Bosnia-Herzegovina	Hard	(Serbia) Tamara Čurović	6–3, 4–1 ret.
Win	15.	18 March 2013	ITF Ipswich, Australia	Hard	(Australia) Storm Sanders	7–5, 2–6, 6–2
Win	16.	19 August 2013	ITF San Luis Potosi, Mexico	Hard	(Mexico) Ana Sofía Sánchez	6–4, 6–4

=== Doubles: 8 (5–3) ===
Result	No.	Date	Tournament	Surface	Partner	Opponents	Score
Win	1.	7 August 2000	ITF Rebecq, Belgium	Clay	(Czech Republic) Lenka Snajdrova	(Belgium) Debbrich Feys (Belgium) Karin Kues	6–7^{(5)}, 6–2, 6–4
Loss	2.	26 March 2001	ITF Amiens, France	Clay	(Germany) Bianca Cremer	(France) Olivia Cappelletti (France) Julie Coin	5–7, 1–6
Loss	3.	13 August 2001	ITF Koksijde, Belgium	Clay	(North Macedonia) Marina Lazarovska	(Czech Republic) Lenka Snajdrova (Sweden) Aleksandra Srndovic	2–6, 4–6
Win	4.	22 July 2007	ITF Wichita, United States	Hard	(United States) Jennifer Elie	(Russia) Anna Egorova (Kazakhstan) Madina Rakhim	6–2, 3–6, 6–1
Win	5.	9 August 2008	ITF Monterrey, Mexico	Hard	(Slovakia) Magdaléna Rybáriková	(Australia) Monique Adamczak (United Kingdom) Melanie South	4–6, 6–4, [10–8]
Win	6.	28 September 2008	ITF Ashland, United States	Hard	(Latvia) Līga Dekmeijere	(United States) Julie Ditty (United States) Carly Gullickson	6–3, 3–6, [10–8]
Loss	7.	13 September 2010	ITF Redding, United States	Hard	(United States) Kim Anh Nguyen	(United States) Christina Fusano (United States) Yasmin Schnack	2–6, 6–3, [6–10]
Win	8.	13 August 2012	ITF Brčko, Bosnia-Herzegovina	Hard	(Croatia) Karla Popović	(Slovakia) Dagmara Bašková (Czech Republic) Tereza Malíková	6–3, 6–2
