= Zsófia Susányi =

Hungarian tennis player

- Country (sports): Hungary
- Born: 16 February 1992 (age 33); Szeged, Hungary
- Height: 1.70 m (5 ft 7 in)
- Prize money: $8,071

Singles
- Career record: 28–21
- Career titles: 1 ITF
- Highest ranking: No. 592 (25 October 2010)

Grand Slam singles results
- French Open Junior: 1R (2008, 2009)
- Wimbledon Junior: QF (2009)
- US Open Junior: 2R (2008, 2009)

Doubles
- Career record: 13–8
- Career titles: 2 ITF
- Highest ranking: No. 562 (18 July 2011)

Grand Slam doubles results
- French Open Junior: 2R (2009)
- Wimbledon Junior: 2R (2009)
- US Open Junior: 2R (2008, 2009)

Team competitions
- Fed Cup: 0–4

Zsófia Susányi (born 16 February 1992) is a Hungarian former tennis player.

Susányi won one singles and two doubles titles on the ITF Women's Circuit in her career. On 25 October 2010, she reached her best singles ranking of world number 592. On 18 July 2011, she peaked at world number 562 in the doubles rankings.

Susányi made four appearances for the Hungary Fed Cup team in 2009 and 2010.

== ITF finals ==
=== Singles (1–1) ===
| Legend $10,000 tournaments | Finals by surface Clay (1–1) |

| Result | No. | Date | Location | Surface | Opponent | Score |
|---|---|---|---|---|---|---|
| Win | 1. | 12 July 2010 | Prokuplje, Serbia | Clay | (Russia) Polina Vinogradova | 6–4, 6–4 |
| Loss | 1. | 4 July 2011 | Prokuplje, Serbia | Clay | (Serbia) Jovana Jakšić | 2–6, 3–6 |

=== Doubles (2–1) ===
| Legend $25,000 tournaments $10,000 tournaments | Finals by surface Hard (0–0) Clay (2–1) |

| Result | No. | Date | Location | Surface | Partner | Opponents | Score |
|---|---|---|---|---|---|---|---|
| Loss | 1. | 27 September 2010 | Tbilisi, Georgia | Clay | (Poland) Paula Kania | (Georgia (country)) Tatia Mikadze (Georgia (country)) Sofia Shapatava | 3–6, 2–6 |
| Win | 1. | 27 June 2011 | Prokuplje, Serbia | Clay | (Slovenia) Polona Reberšak | (Bulgaria) Isabella Shinikova (Bulgaria) Julia Stamatova | 6–4, 7–6^{(7–2)} |
| Win | 2. | 4 July 2011 | Prokuplje, Serbia | Clay | (Slovenia) Polona Reberšak | (Romania) Claudia Enache (Austria) Katharina Negrin | 6–2, 4–6, 6–4 |

== Fed Cup participation ==
=== Singles ===
| Edition | Stage | Date | Location | Against | Surface | Opponent | W/L | Score |
|---|---|---|---|---|---|---|---|---|
| 2009 Fed Cup; Europe/Africa Zone Group I | P/O | 7 February 2009 | Tallinn, Estonia | Sweden | Hard (i) | (Sweden) Johanna Larsson | L | 1–6, 2–6 |
| 2010 Fed Cup; Europe/Africa Zone Group I | P/O | 6 February 2010 | Lisbon, Portugal | Romania | Hard (i) | (Romania) Irina-Camelia Begu | L | 6–7^{(3–7)}, 1–6 |

=== Doubles ===
| Edition | Stage | Date | Location | Against | Surface | Partner | Opponents | W/L | Score |
|---|---|---|---|---|---|---|---|---|---|
| 2010 Fed Cup; Europe/Africa Zone Group I | R/R | 4 February 2010 | Lisbon, Portugal | Denmark | Hard (i) | (Hungary) Réka Luca Jani | (Denmark) Malou Ejdesgaard (Denmark) Karina Jacobsgaard | L | 6–3, 3–6, 1–6 |
| 2010 Fed Cup; Europe/Africa Zone Group I | R/R | 5 February 2010 | Lisbon, Portugal | Sweden | Hard (i) | (Hungary) Réka Luca Jani | (Sweden) Ellen Allgurin (Sweden) Anna Brazhnikova | L | 4–6, 2–6 |
