= 2008 US Open – Girls' doubles =

Girls' doubles
- 2008 US Open

Final
- Champions: (Thailand) Noppawan Lertcheewakarn (Sweden) Sandra Roma
- Runners-up: (United States) Mallory Burdette (United States) Sloane Stephens
- Score: 6–0, 6–2

Events
Singles	men	women		boys	girls
Doubles	men	women	mixed	boys	girls
WC Singles	men	women	quad
WC Doubles	men	women	quad
Legends	men	women	mixed
- US Open

Ksenia Milevskaya and Urszula Radwańska were the defending champions, but did not compete in the juniors that year.

Noppawan Lertcheewakarn and Sandra Roma won the tournament, defeating Mallory Burdette and Sloane Stephens in the final, 6–0, 6–2.

== Seeds ==
1. (Romania) Elena Bogdan / (Russia) Elena Chernyakova (first round)
2. (Romania) Ana Bogdan / (France) Kristina Mladenovic (first round)
3. (Thailand) Noppawan Lertcheewakarn / (Sweden) Sandra Roma (champions)
4. (France) Cindy Chala / (Australia) Johanna Konta (first round)
5. (Netherlands) Richèl Hogenkamp / (Netherlands) Arantxa Rus (semifinals)
6. (Russia) Ksenia Lykina / (Poland) Sandra Zaniewska (first round)
7. (Hungary) Tímea Babos / (Japan) Aki Yamasoto (second round)
8. (Japan) Misaki Doi / (Japan) Kurumi Nara (quarterfinals)

== Draw ==
Key

- Q = Qualifier
- WC = Wild card
- LL = Lucky loser
- Alt = Alternate
- ITF = ITF entry
- PR = Protected ranking
- SR = Special ranking
- SE = Special exempt
- JE = Junior exempt
- JR = Junior Accelerator Programme entrant
- CO = College Accelerator Programme entrant
- NG = Next Gen Accelerator Program entrant
- w/o = Walkover
- r = Retired
- d = Defaulted

=== Finals ===
Semifinals
(United States) Mallory Burdette (United States) Sloane Stephens	7^{7}	6
5	(Netherlands) Richèl Hogenkamp (Netherlands) Arantxa Rus	6^{3}	2
3	(Thailand) Noppawan Lertcheewakarn (Sweden) Sandra Roma	6	5	[10]
(Indonesia) Beatrice Gumulya (Indonesia) Jessy Rompies	3	7	[8]

Final
(United States) Mallory Burdette (United States) Sloane Stephens	0	2
3	(Thailand) Noppawan Lertcheewakarn (Sweden) Sandra Roma	6	6

=== Top half ===
First round
1	(Romania) E Bogdan (Russia) E Chernyakova	3	2
WC	(United States) J Boserup (United States) C McHale	6	6
(United States) M Burdette (United States) S Stephens	7^{8}	1	[10]
(Russia) Y Buchina (Kazakhstan) Z Diyas	6^{6}	6	[5]
(Italy) N Burnett (Italy) A Grymalska	6^{4}	3
(South Africa) C Simmonds (South Africa) B Swanepoel	7^{7}	6
(Germany) L Berlinecke (Netherlands) Q Lemoine	2	4
7	(Hungary) T Babos (Japan) A Yamasoto	6	6
4	(France) C Chala (Australia) J Konta	2	2
WC	(United States) A Muhammad (United States) M Oudin	6	6
(Austria) J Toljan (Italy) M Trevisan	3	2
(United States) M Brengle (Australia) I Holland	6	6
(Russia) V Kamenskaya (Slovakia) Z Luknárová	7	1	[7]
(Romania) A Damaschin (Canada) R Marino	5	6	[10]
(United States) N Bartnik (United Kingdom) H Watson	4	3
5	(Netherlands) R Hogenkamp (Netherlands) A Rus	6	6

Second round
WC	(United States) J Boserup (United States) C McHale	1	5
(United States) M Burdette (United States) S Stephens	6	7
(South Africa) C Simmonds (South Africa) B Swanepoel	4	6	[10]
7	(Hungary) T Babos (Japan) A Yamasoto	6	1	[4]
WC	(United States) A Muhammad (United States) M Oudin	2	6	[10]
(United States) M Brengle (Australia) I Holland	6	3	[6]
(Romania) A Damaschin (Canada) R Marino	1	2
5	(Netherlands) R Hogenkamp (Netherlands) A Rus	6	6

Quarterfinals
(United States) M Burdette (United States) S Stephens	7	6
(South Africa) C Simmonds (South Africa) B Swanepoel	5	2
WC	(United States) A Muhammad (United States) M Oudin	3	5
5	(Netherlands) R Hogenkamp (Netherlands) A Rus	6	7

Semifinals
(United States) M Burdette (United States) S Stephens	7^{7}	6
5	(Netherlands) R Hogenkamp (Netherlands) A Rus	6^{3}	2

=== Bottom half ===
First round
8	(Japan) M Doi (Japan) K Nara	6	6
(Canada) G Dabrowski (Serbia) M Špremo	4	4
WC	(United States) K Ahn (United States) N Gibbs	7^{7}	6
(Bulgaria) B Otashliyska (Czech Republic) M Tůmová	6^{3}	1
(Hungary) R-L Jani (Hungary) Z Susányi	6^{5}	6	[10]
(Thailand) N Lertpitaksinchai (Thailand) K Narattana	7^{7}	0	[6]
WC	(United States) J Hampton (United States) C Vandeweghe	4	6^{3}
3	(Thailand) N Lertcheewakarn (Sweden) S Roma	6	7^{7}
6	(Russia) K Lykina (Poland) S Zaniewska	0	3
(Russia) V Savinykh (Russia) M Sirotkina	6	6
(Indonesia) B Gumulya (Indonesia) J Rompies	6	6
(United States) A Guarachi (United States) L McHale	2	2
(Paraguay) V Cepede Royg (Croatia) S Njirić	5	4
(Venezuela) G Paz (Croatia) A Tomljanović	7	6
(Poland) K Piter (Slovakia) R Tabak	6	7^{7}
2	(Romania) A Bogdan (France) K Mladenovic	3	6^{5}

Second round
8	(Japan) M Doi (Japan) K Nara	6	6
WC	(United States) K Ahn (United States) N Gibbs	3	2
(Hungary) R-L Jani (Hungary) Z Susányi	1	6	[0]
3	(Thailand) N Lertcheewakarn (Sweden) S Roma	6	2	[10]
(Russia) V Savinykh (Russia) M Sirotkina	1	5
(Indonesia) B Gumulya (Indonesia) J Rompies	6	7
(Venezuela) G Paz (Croatia) A Tomljanović	1	2
(Poland) K Piter (Slovakia) R Tabak	6	6

Quarterfinals
8	(Japan) M Doi (Japan) K Nara	3	5
3	(Thailand) N Lertcheewakarn (Sweden) S Roma	6	7
(Indonesia) B Gumulya (Indonesia) J Rompies	6	7
(Poland) K Piter (Slovakia) R Tabak	2	5

Semifinals
3	(Thailand) N Lertcheewakarn (Sweden) S Roma	6	5	[10]
(Indonesia) B Gumulya (Indonesia) J Rompies	3	7	[8]
