= Tamaryn Hendler =

Belgian tennis player

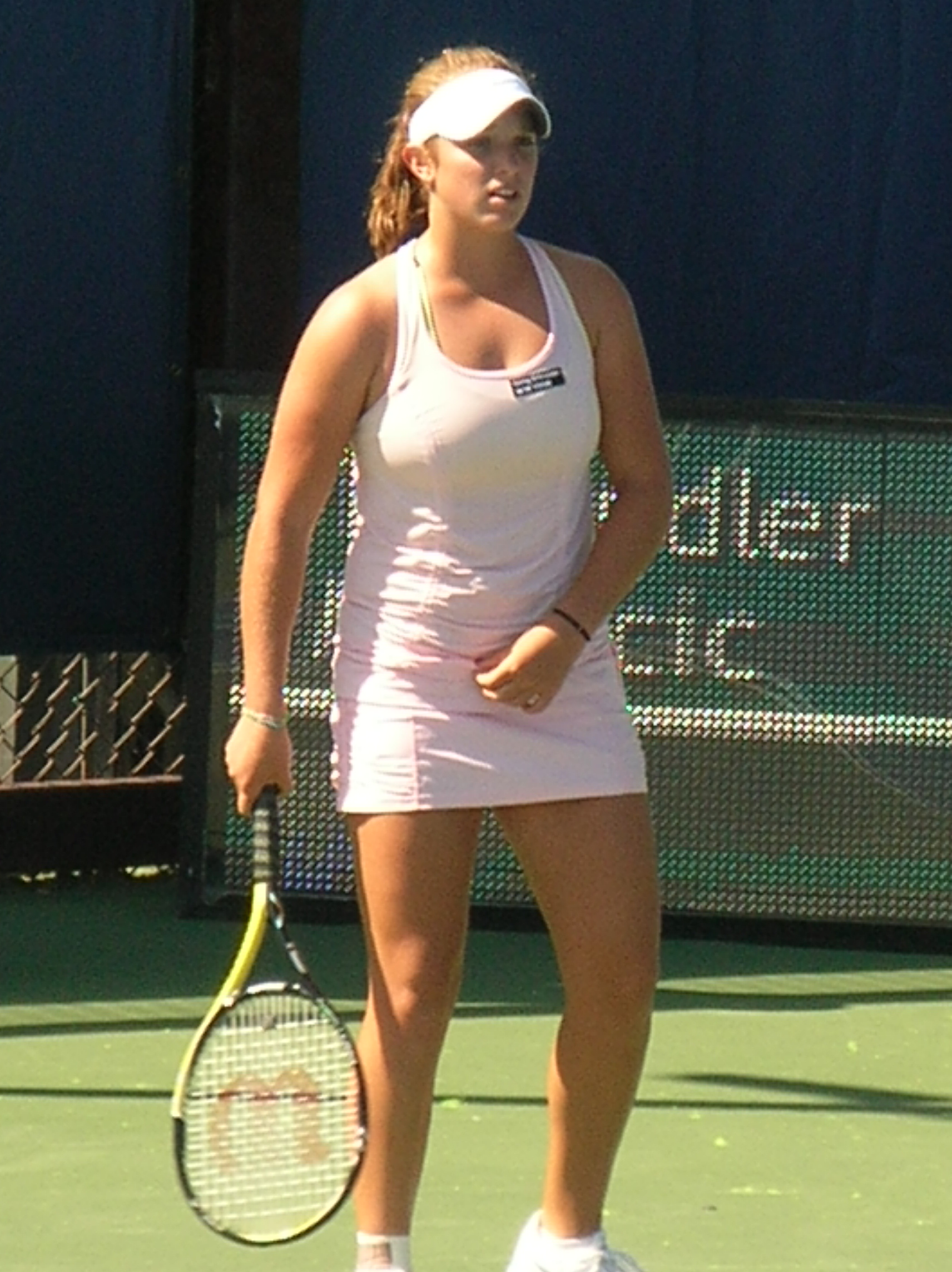
- Hendler at the 2010 Bank of the West Classic
- Country (sports): Belgium
- Residence: Bradenton, United States
- Born: 12 August 1992 (age 32); Cape Town, South Africa
- Height: 1.74 m (5 ft 8 1/2 in)
- Turned pro: 2007
- Plays: Left-handed (two-handed backhand)
- Prize money: $117,979

Singles
- Career record: 166–109
- Career titles: 4 ITF
- Highest ranking: No. 178 (9 July 2012)

Grand Slam singles results
- Australian Open: Q1 (2012)
- French Open: Q2 (2012)
- Wimbledon: Q1 (2012)
- US Open: Q1 (2012,2013)

Doubles
- Career record: 62–47
- Career titles: 5 ITF
- Highest ranking: No. 182 (16 July 2012)

Tamaryn Hendler (born 12 August 1992), better known as Tammy Hendler or Tammy Emmrich, is a Belgian former tennis player. She is married to fellow tennis and pickleball player Martin Emmrich.

Hendler, who resides in Boca Raton, Florida, reached the quarterfinals in the 2008 US Open girls' singles tournament and the semifinals at 2008 junior Wimbledon Championships. She has won four singles titles and five doubles titles on the ITF Women's Circuit, as well as some of the biggest junior tournaments in the world, including Little Mo and Orange Bowl.

She represented Belgium in several Fed Cup ties since 2007 with a win–loss record of 0–8.

Hendler competed in all four Grand Slam qualifying events in 2012. At Roland Garros, she reached the second round of qualifying for the single time in her career.

== ITF Circuit finals ==
=== Singles: 7 (4 titles, 3 runner-ups) ===
Legend $50,000 tournaments $25,000 tournaments $15,000 tournaments	Finals by surface Hard (3–1) Clay (0–2) Carpet (1–0)

Result	W–L	Date	Tier	Tournament	Surface	Opponent	Score
Win	1.	18 October 2008	25,000	Lagos Open, Nigeria	Hard	(India) Ankita Bhambri	6–3, 2–6, 6–3
Win	2.	11 September 2011	25,000	ITF Noto, Japan	Carpet	(Japan) Misa Eguchi	7–6^{(4)}, 6–1
Win	3.	2 October 2011	25,000	ITF Jakarta, Indonesia	Hard	(South Africa) Chanel Simmonds	5–7, 6–4, 6–3
Win	4.	29 October 2011	25,000	Lagos Open, Nigeria	Hard	(Croatia) Donna Vekić	6–4, 7–5
Loss	1.	14 May 2012	25,000	ITF Raleigh, United States	Clay	(United States) Grace Min	6–3, 2–6, 3–6
Loss	2.	23 September 2017	15,000	ITF Hua Hin, Thailand	Hard	(Chinese Taipei) Lee Hua-chen	2–6, 2–6
Loss	3.	27 May 2018	15,000	ITF Oeiras, Portugal	Clay	(Switzerland) Ylena In-Albon	5–7, ret.

=== Doubles: 8 (5–3) ===
Legend $50,000 tournaments $25,000 tournaments $15,000 tournaments	Finals by surface Hard (4–2) Clay (1–1) Carpet (0–0)

Result	No.	Date	Tier	Tournament	Surface	Partner	Opponents	Score
Loss	1.	28 June 2008	25,000	ITF Kristinehamn, Sweden	Clay	(Finland) Emma Laine	(Austria) Patricia Mayr (Slovakia) Lenka Tvarošková	3–6, 4–6
Loss	2.	17 October 2008	25,000	Lagos Open, Nigeria	Hard	(Switzerland) Lisa Sabino	(South Africa) Surina De Beer (Romania) Ágnes Szatmári	6–7, 3–6
Loss	3.	28 November 2008	25,000	ITF Saint-Denis, France (Réunion)	Hard	(South Africa) Surina De Beer	(Germany) Carmen Klaschka (Germany) Laura Siegemund	3–6, 1–6
Win	1.	24 July 2011	50,000	Lexington Challenger, United States	Hard	(United States) Chiara Scholl	(United States) Lindsay Lee-Waters (United States) Megan Moulton-Levy	7–6^{(9)}, 3–6, [10–7]
Win	2.	3 October 2011	25,000	ITF Palembang, Indonesia	Hard	(South Africa) Chanel Simmonds	(Indonesia) Ayu Fani Damayanti (Indonesia) Jessy Rompies	6–4, 6–2
Win	3.	24 March 2012	25,000	ITF Bangalore, India	Hard	(Austria) Melanie Klaffner	(Slovenia) Tadeja Majerič (Slovenia) Anja Prislan	6–2, 4–6, [10–6]
Win	4.	18 November 2017	25,000	ITF Norman, United States	Hard	(United States) Chiara Scholl	(United States) Maria Sanchez (United States) Caitlin Whoriskey	3–6, 6–3, [10–6]
Win	5.	9 December 2017	25,000	ITF Santiago, Chile	Clay	(Russia) Anastasia Pivovarova	(Brazil) Carolina Alves (Mexico) Ana Sofía Sánchez	7–5, 6–2
