= Gabriela Paz =

Venezuelan tennis player

- Country (sports): Venezuela
- Residence: Miami, United States
- Born: 30 September 1991 (age 33); Valencia, Venezuela
- Height: 5 ft 5 in (1.65 m)
- Turned pro: 2006
- Retired: May 2015
- Plays: Right handed (two-handed backhand)
- Prize money: $50,848

Singles
- Career record: 144–61
- Career titles: 8 ITF
- Highest ranking: No. 230 (6 April 2009)

Doubles
- Career record: 36–22
- Career titles: 3 ITF
- Highest ranking: No. 299 (23 July 2012)

Team competitions
- Fed Cup: 4–3

Gabriela Paz Franco (born 30 September 1991 in Valencia) is a Venezuelan former tennis player.

Her career-high singles world rank was No. 230. On 23 July 2012, she peaked in the doubles world ranking at No. 299. In her career, Paz won eight singles and three doubles titles on the ITF Women's Circuit.

== Career ==
As a junior, she reached a career-high world rank at No. 10. She was the runner-up of the girls' singles tournament at the 2008 US Open, where she lost to wildcard CoCo Vandeweghe.

Paz first played for Venezuela in the 2012 Fed Cup Americas Zone, playing in all five matches, winning four of her five singles, and losing both doubles with partner Adriana Pérez. (Note: Gabriela Paz at the Billie Jean King Cup (archived))

Her most recent WTA event was at the 2012 Citi Open in Washington, D.C. where she entered the tournament at world rank No. 280. She played in the qualifying, beating Allie Klick in the first round, and then lost to Michelle Larcher de Brito in the final round of qualifying.

In May 2015, Gabriela Paz confirmed her retirement from professional tennis, saying she wanted to become a coach.

== ITF Circuit finals ==
$25,000 tournaments
$10,000 tournaments

=== Singles: 10 (8–2) ===
Outcome	No.	Date	Tournament	Surface	Opponent	Score
Winner	1	27 May 2007	El Paso, United States	Hard	(Bosnia and Herzegovina) Helena Bešović	6–3, 6–0
Runner-up	1	1 July 2007	Edmond, United States	Hard	(Croatia) Jelena Pandžić	6–3, 1–6, 4–6
Runner-up	2	22 July 2007	Wichita, United States	Hard	(Croatia) Jelena Pandžić	4–6, 4–6
Winner	2	18 January 2009	Boca Raton, United States	Clay	(Canada) Sharon Fichman	6–4, 7–6^{(7–4)}
Winner	3	8 March 2009	Fort Walton Beach, United States	Hard	(Belarus) Ekaterina Dzehalevich	1–6, 6–4, 7–5
Winner	4	25 July 2010	Evansville, United States	Hard	(United States) Chiara Scholl	6–4, 6–0
Winner	5	1 August 2010	St. Joseph, United States	Hard	(Thailand) Noppawan Lertcheewakarn	6–1, 6–4
Winner	6	28 April 2012	São Paulo, Brazil	Clay	(Brazil) Gabriela Cé	6–4, 6–2
Winner	7	5 May 2012	São José dos Campos, Brazil	Clay	(France) Alizé Lim	6–4, 6–4
Winner	8	13 May 2012	Brasília, Brazil	Clay	(Chile) Andrea Koch Benvenuto	6–3, 6–3

=== Doubles: 6 (3–3) ===
Outcome	No.	Date	Tournament	Surface	Partnering	Opponents	Score
Runner-up	1	24 July 2010	Evansville, United States	Hard	(Ukraine) Anastasia Kharchenko	(United States) Brynn Boren (United States) Sabrina Santamaria	3–6, 4–6
Runner-up	2	31 July 2010	St. Joseph, United States	Hard	(Thailand) Noppawan Lertcheewakarn	(United States) Maria Sanchez (United States) Ellen Tsay	6–4, 4–6, 4–6
Runner-up	3	23 October 2011	Rock Hill, United States	Hard	(United States) Madison Brengle	(Croatia) Maria Abramović (Brazil) Roxane Vaisemberg	3–6, 6–3, [10–5]
Winner	1	27 April 2012	São Paulo, Brazil	Clay	(Brazil) Ana Clara Duarte	(Brazil) Gabriela Cé (Brazil) Carla Forte	5–7, 6–3, 10–5
Winner	2	4 May 2012	São José dos Campos, Brazil	Clay	(Bolivia) María Fernanda Álvarez Terán	(Brazil) Carla Forte (Brazil) Laura Pigossi	6–0, 6–3
Winner	3	12 May 2012	Brasília, Brazil	Clay	(Bolivia) María Fernanda Álvarez Terán	(France) Alizé Lim (Bulgaria) Aleksandrina Naydenova	6–2, 6–4

== Junior Grand Slam finals ==
Result	Date	Championship	Surface	Opponent	Score
Loss	7 September 2008	US Open	Hard	(United States) CoCo Vandeweghe	6–7^{(3–7)}, 1–6
