= 2008 US Open – Girls' singles =

Girls' singles
- 2008 US Open

Final
- Champion: (United States) CoCo Vandeweghe
- Runner-up: (Venezuela) Gabriela Paz
- Score: 7–6^{(7–3)}, 6–1

Events
Singles	men	women		boys	girls
Doubles	men	women	mixed	boys	girls
WC Singles	men	women	quad
WC Doubles	men	women	quad
Legends	men	women	mixed
- US Open

Kristína Kučová was the defending champion, but did not compete in the juniors that year.

CoCo Vandeweghe won the tournament, defeating Gabriela Paz in the final, 7–6^{(7–3)}, 6–1.

== Seeds ==
1. (Netherlands) Arantxa Rus (first round)
2. (United States) Melanie Oudin (semifinals)
3. (Thailand) Noppawan Lertcheewakarn (third round)
4. (Australia) Jessica Moore (withdrew)
5. (Romania) Elena Bogdan (quarterfinals)
6. (Romania) Ana Bogdan (first round)
7. (Japan) Kurumi Nara (third round)
8. (Russia) Ksenia Lykina (second round)
9. (Indonesia) Jessy Rompies (first round)
10. (France) Cindy Chala (first round)
11. (Belgium) Tamaryn Hendler (quarterfinals)
12. (France) Kristina Mladenovic (semifinals)
13. (Russia) Elena Chernyakova (first round)
14. (Australia) Johanna Konta (first round)
15. (Germany) Linda Berlinecke (first round)
16. (Japan) Aki Yamasoto (first round)

== Draw ==
Key

- Q = Qualifier
- WC = Wild card
- LL = Lucky loser
- Alt = Alternate
- ITF = ITF entry
- PR = Protected ranking
- SR = Special ranking
- SE = Special exempt
- JE = Junior exempt
- JR = Junior Accelerator Programme entrant
- CO = College Accelerator Programme entrant
- NG = Next Gen Accelerator Program entrant
- w/o = Walkover
- r = Retired
- d = Defaulted

=== Finals ===
Quarterfinals
WC	(United States) Gail Brodsky	7	6^{8}	4
12	(France) Kristina Mladenovic	5	7^{10}	6
WC	(United States) CoCo Vandeweghe	6	6
11	(Belgium) Tamaryn Hendler	2	0
5	(Romania) Elena Bogdan	3	0
(Venezuela) Gabriela Paz	6	6
(United States) Madison Brengle	6	4	1
2	(United States) Melanie Oudin	4	6	6

Semifinals
12	(France) Kristina Mladenovic	2	6^{5}
WC	(United States) CoCo Vandeweghe	6	7^{7}
(Venezuela) Gabriela Paz	6	6
2	(United States) Melanie Oudin	4	4

Final
WC	(United States) CoCo Vandeweghe	7^{7}	6
(Venezuela) Gabriela Paz	6^{3}	1

=== Top half ===
==== Section 1 ====
First round
1	(Netherlands) Arantxa Rus	4	1
(Russia) Viktoria Kamenskaya	6	6
WC	(United States) Lauren Davis	3	2
(Croatia) Ajla Tomljanović	6	6
(United States) Nicole Gibbs	7	3	2
(Russia) Yana Buchina	5	6	6
WC	(United States) Gail Brodsky	4	6	6
15	(Germany) Linda Berlinecke	6	4	2
12	(France) Kristina Mladenovic	6	6
Q	(Canada) Gabriela Dabrowski	3	3
(Australia) Isabella Holland	6	6
(Italy) Anastasia Grymalska	4	3
(Romania) Alexandra Damaschin	6	4	6
(Hungary) Réka Luca Jani	2	6	2
(United States) Mallory Burdette	2	5
7	(Japan) Kurumi Nara	6	7

Second round
(Russia) V Kamenskaya	6	6^{5}	3
(Croatia) A Tomljanović	2	7^{7}	6
(Russia) Y Buchina	4	0
WC	(United States) G Brodsky	6	6
12	(France) K Mladenovic	6	6^{0}	6
(Australia) I Holland	1	7^{7}	4
(Romania) A Damaschin	2	0
7	(Japan) K Nara	6	6

Third round
(Croatia) A Tomljanović	1	6^{1}
WC	(United States) G Brodsky	6	7^{7}
12	(France) K Mladenovic	2	6	7^{7}
7	(Japan) K Nara	6	4	6^{4}

Quarterfinals
WC	(United States) G Brodsky	7	6^{8}	4
12	(France) K Mladenovic	5	7^{10}	6

==== Section 2 ====
First round
LL	(Austria) Janina Toljan	1	1
WC	(United States) Sloane Stephens	6	6
Q	(Czech Republic) Monika Tůmová	4	1
(Poland) Katarzyna Piter	6	6
WC	(United States) Kristie Ahn	6	2	6
(Serbia) Milana Špremo	3	6	4
WC	(United States) CoCo Vandeweghe	7	6
13	(Russia) Elena Chernyakova	5	1
11	(Belgium) Tamaryn Hendler	6	6
(Russia) Valeria Savinykh	2	2
Q	(Thailand) Kanyapat Narattana	6	6
(South Africa) Bianca Swanepoel	0	4
(Indonesia) Beatrice Gumulya	6	6
(Slovakia) Zuzana Luknárová	2	3
Q	(Netherlands) Quirine Lemoine	7^{7}	2	6
6	(Romania) Ana Bogdan	6^{4}	6	4

Second round
WC	(United States) S Stephens	3	6	3
(Poland) K Piter	6	4	6
WC	(United States) K Ahn	3	4
WC	(United States) C Vandeweghe	6	6
11	(Belgium) T Hendler	6	6
Q	(Thailand) K Narattana	4	4
(Indonesia) B Gumulya	7	6^{4}	6^{3}
Q	(Netherlands) Q Lemoine	5	7^{7}	7^{7}

Third round
(Poland) K Piter	6^{5}	1
WC	(United States) C Vandeweghe	7^{7}	6
11	(Belgium) T Hendler	6	6
Q	(Netherlands) Q Lemoine	4	2

Quarterfinals
WC	(United States) C Vandeweghe	6	6
11	(Belgium) T Hendler	2	0

=== Bottom half ===
==== Section 3 ====
First round
5	(Romania) Elena Bogdan	6	6
(South Africa) Chanel Simmonds	1	0
Q	(United States) Beatrice Capra	3	1
(Sweden) Sandra Roma	6	6
(Hungary) Zsófia Susányi	7	7
LL	(United States) Alexa Guarachi	5	5
(Russia) Marta Sirotkina	7^{7}	6
9	(Indonesia) Jessy Rompies	6^{5}	2
16	(Japan) Aki Yamasoto	6	6^{6}	2
(Paraguay) Verónica Cepede Royg	2	7^{8}	6
(Canada) Rebecca Marino	4	6^{7}
(Venezuela) Gabriela Paz	6	7^{9}
Q	(United Kingdom) Heather Watson	6	6
Q	(United States) Lauren McHale	3	4
(Kazakhstan) Zarina Diyas	6^{7}	0
3	(Thailand) Noppawan Lertcheewakarn	7^{9}	6

Second round
5	(Romania) E Bogdan	6	5	6
(Sweden) S Roma	4	7	4
(Hungary) Z Susányi	3	1
(Russia) M Sirotkina	6	6
(Paraguay) V Cepede Royg	2	5
(Venezuela) G Paz	6	7
Q	(United Kingdom) H Watson	4	4
3	(Thailand) N Lertcheewakarn	6	6

Third round
5	(Romania) E Bogdan	6	6
(Russia) M Sirotkina	4	3
(Venezuela) G Paz	6	6
3	(Thailand) N Lertcheewakarn	3	4

Quarterfinals
5	(Romania) E Bogdan	3	0
(Venezuela) G Paz	6	6

==== Section 4 ====
First round
8	(Russia) Ksenia Lykina	6	6
Q	(Bulgaria) Bistra Otashliyska	1	2
(Japan) Misaki Doi	3	4
WC	(United States) Christina McHale	6	6
(Croatia) Silvia Njirić	6	7
(Poland) Sandra Zaniewska	1	5
(United States) Madison Brengle	6	6
10	(France) Cindy Chala	2	2
14	(Australia) Johanna Konta	3	1
WC	(United States) Asia Muhammad	6	6
(Slovakia) Romana Tabak	6	6
(Netherlands) Richèl Hogenkamp	4	1
(Italy) Nastassja Burnett	6	4	6
WC	(United States) Julia Boserup	3	6	4
(Hungary) Tímea Babos	2	2
2	(United States) Melanie Oudin	6	6

Second round
8	(Russia) K Lykina	5	1
WC	(United States) C McHale	7	6
(Croatia) S Njirić	6^{1}	3
(United States) M Brengle	7^{7}	6
WC	(United States) A Muhammad	6	6
(Slovakia) R Tabak	3	4
(Italy) N Burnett	4	1
2	(United States) M Oudin	6	6

Third round
WC	(United States) C McHale	4	0
(United States) M Brengle	6	6
WC	(United States) A Muhammad	1	1
2	(United States) M Oudin	6	6

Quarterfinals
(United States) M Brengle	6	4	1
2	(United States) M Oudin	4	6	6
