= Cindy Chala =

French tennis player

- Country (sports): France
- Born: 17 May 1991 (age 34) Saint-Cloud, France
- Turned pro: 2009
- Plays: Left-handed
- College: VCU Rams

Singles
- Highest ranking: No. 439 (14 June 2010)

Cindy Chala (born 17 May 1991) is a former professional French tennis player. On 14 June 2010, she reached her highest WTA singles ranking of 439.

== Career ==
Chala had a successful junior career. Her career-high ranking as a junior was world No. 11. In 2007, Chala won a prestigious tournament for juniors Porto Alegre Junior Championships (Grade A) She won one singles title and one doubles title on the ITF Women's Circuit. She is two times French Champion, in 2007 and 2009.

She decided to follow the college route and was part of the VCU Rams tennis team from 2012 to 2015.

== ITF Junior Circuit finals ==
Legend
Category GA
Category G1
Category G2
Category G3
Category G4
Category G5

=== Singles (2–2) ===
Result	No.	Date	Location	Grade	Surface	Opponent	Score
Loss	1.	February 2006	Las Condes, Chile	G2	Clay	(Bolivia) María Fernanda Álvarez Terán	4–6, 0–6
Win	2.	March 2007	Copa Gerdau, Brazil	GA	Clay	(Brazil) Roxane Vaisemberg	6–4, 4–6, 7–5
Loss	3.	April 2007	Beaulieu-sur-Mer, France	G1	Clay	(Russia) Ksenia Lykina	7–5, 4–6, 3–6
Win	4.	January 2008	Traralgon, Australia	G1	Hard	(Canada) Rebecca Marino	6–4, 6–4

=== Doubles (2–1) ===
Result	No.	Date	Location	Grade	Surface	Partner	Opponents	Score
Win	1.	August 2005	Clermont-Ferrand, France	G4	Clay	(France) Marie Menacer	(France) Kelly Couturier (France) Valentina Fauviau	7–6, 7–5
Win	2.	April 2008	Istres, France	G2	Clay	(Slovakia) Klaudia Boczová	(France) Irina Ramialison (Russia) Polina Rodionova	6–2, 6–0
Loss	3.	April 2008	Beaulieu-sur-Mer, France	G1	Clay	(Russia) Valeria Savinykh	(France) Amandine Hesse (France) Kristina Mladenovic	4–6, 5–7
