= 2008 US Open – Mixed doubles =

Mixed doubles
- 2008 US Open

Final
- Champions: (Zimbabwe) Cara Black (India) Leander Paes
- Runners-up: (United States) Liezel Huber (United Kingdom) Jamie Murray
- Score: 7–6^{(8–6)}, 6–4

Details
- Draw: 32
- Seeds: 8

Events
Singles	men	women		boys	girls
Doubles	men	women	mixed	boys	girls
WC Singles	men	women	quad
WC Doubles	men	women	quad
Legends	men	women	mixed
- US Open

Victoria Azarenka and Max Mirnyi were the defending champions, but Azarenka chose not to participate. Mirnyi partnered with Anna Chakvetadze, but lost in the first round to Nadia Petrova and Jonas Björkman.

Cara Black and Leander Paes won the title, defeating Liezel Huber and Jamie Murray in the final 7–6^{(8–6)}, 6–4.

== Seeds ==
1. (Chinese Taipei) Chia-jung Chuang / (Canada) Daniel Nestor (first round)
2. (Slovenia) Katarina Srebotnik / (Serbia) Nenad Zimonjić (quarterfinals)
3. (Japan) Ai Sugiyama / (Zimbabwe) Kevin Ullyett (first round)
4. (Chinese Taipei) Yung-jan Chan / (Austria) Julian Knowle (first round)
5. (Zimbabwe) Cara Black / (India) Leander Paes (champions)
6. (Czech Republic) Květa Peschke / (Czech Republic) Pavel Vízner (second round)
7. (China) Yan Zi / (The Bahamas) Mark Knowles (first round)
8. (France) Nathalie Dechy / (Israel) Andy Ram (first round)

== Draw ==
Key

- Q = Qualifier
- WC = Wild card
- LL = Lucky loser
- Alt = Alternate
- ITF = ITF entry
- PR = Protected ranking
- SR = Special ranking
- SE = Special exempt
- JE = Junior exempt
- JR = Junior Accelerator Programme entrant
- CO = College Accelerator Programme entrant
- NG = Next Gen Accelerator Program entrant
- w/o = Walkover
- r = Retired
- d = Defaulted

=== Finals ===
Semifinals
5	(Zimbabwe) Cara Black (India) Leander Paes	6	6
(Russia) Nadia Petrova (Sweden) Jonas Björkman	4	4
WC	(United States) Jill Craybas (United States) Eric Butorac	3	4
(United States) Liezel Huber (United Kingdom) Jamie Murray	6	6

Final
5	(Zimbabwe) Cara Black (India) Leander Paes	7^{8}	6
(United States) Liezel Huber (United Kingdom) Jamie Murray	6^{6}	4

=== Top half ===
First round
1	(Chinese Taipei) C-j Chuang (Canada) D Nestor	1	4
WC	(United States) S Stephens (United States) R Kendrick	6	6
WC	(United States) R Zalameda (United States) K Van't Hof	4	6	[8]
(Czech Republic) V Uhlířová (Czech Republic) M Damm	6	3	[10]
(Denmark) C Wozniacki (Poland) M Matkowski	6	6
(Israel) S Pe'er (Australia) P Hanley	0	4
WC	(United States) M Oudin (United States) D Young	3	2
5	(Zimbabwe) C Black (India) L Paes	6	6
4	(Chinese Taipei) Y-j Chan (Austria) J Knowle	3	1
(Australia) C Dellacqua (Australia) J Kerr	6	6
(Russia) A Chakvetadze (Belarus) M Mirnyi	3	1
(Russia) N Petrova (Sweden) J Björkman	6	6
WC	(United States) A Glatch (United States) S Lipsky	3	3
(Australia) S Stosur (India) M Bhupathi	6	6
(Australia) R Stubbs (Sweden) R Lindstedt	6	6
8	(France) N Dechy (Israel) A Ram	4	4

Second round
WC	(United States) S Stephens (United States) R Kendrick	5	5
(Czech Republic) V Uhlířová (Czech Republic) M Damm	7	7
(Denmark) C Wozniacki (Poland) M Matkowski
5	(Zimbabwe) C Black (India) L Paes	w/o
(Australia) C Dellacqua (Australia) J Kerr	3	3
(Russia) N Petrova (Sweden) J Björkman	6	6
(Australia) S Stosur (India) M Bhupathi	6	3	[10]
(Australia) R Stubbs (Sweden) R Lindstedt	2	6	[12]

Quarterfinals
(Czech Republic) V Uhlířová (Czech Republic) M Damm	5	2
5	(Zimbabwe) C Black (India) L Paes	7	6
(Russia) N Petrova (Sweden) J Björkman	6	6
(Australia) R Stubbs (Sweden) R Lindstedt	3	2

Semifinals
5	(Zimbabwe) C Black (India) L Paes	6	6
(Russia) N Petrova (Sweden) J Björkman	4	4

=== Bottom half ===
First round
7	(China) Z Yan (The Bahamas) M Knowles	6^{7}	3	r
(Russia) E Vesnina (Poland) M Fyrstenberg	7^{9}	2
(Slovakia) J Husárová (South Africa) J Coetzee	1	1
Alt	(Italy) F Pennetta (Serbia) D Vemić	6	6
(United States) L Raymond (Brazil) M Melo	6	6
(China) S Peng (Czech Republic) L Dlouhý	3	2
WC	(United States) J Craybas (United States) E Butorac	6	6
3	(Japan) A Sugiyama (Zimbabwe) K Ullyett	4	4
6	(Czech Republic) K Peschke (Czech Republic) P Vízner	6	2	[10]
(Slovakia) D Cibulková (Austria) J Melzer	4	6	[6]
(Ukraine) K Bondarenko (Brazil) A Sá	3	2
(United States) L Huber (United Kingdom) J Murray	6	6
Alt	(France) V Razzano (Netherlands) R Wassen	6	3	[10]
(Belarus) T Poutchek (Germany) C Kas	2	6	[5]
Alt	(Australia) A Rodionova (Australia) J Cerretani	3	2
2	(Slovenia) K Srebotnik (Serbia) N Zimonjić	6	6

Second round
(Russia) E Vesnina (Poland) M Fyrstenberg	4	5
Alt	(Italy) F Pennetta (Serbia) D Vemić	6	7
(United States) L Raymond (Brazil) M Melo	5	5
WC	(United States) J Craybas (United States) E Butorac	7	7
6	(Czech Republic) K Peschke (Czech Republic) P Vízner	5	3
(United States) L Huber (United Kingdom) J Murray	7	6
Alt	(France) V Razzano (Netherlands) R Wassen	1	7	[8]
2	(Slovenia) K Srebotnik (Serbia) N Zimonjić	6	5	[10]

Quarterfinals
Alt	(Italy) F Pennetta (Serbia) D Vemić	7	4	[4]
WC	(United States) J Craybas (United States) E Butorac	6^{4}	6	[10]
(United States) L Huber (United Kingdom) J Murray	7^{7}	6^{9}	[11]
2	(Slovenia) K Srebotnik (Serbia) N Zimonjić	6^{5}	7^{11}	[9]

Semifinals
WC	(United States) J Craybas (United States) E Butorac	3	4
(United States) L Huber (United Kingdom) J Murray	6	6
