= 2008 US Open – Boys' singles =

Boys' singles
- 2008 US Open

Final
- Champion: (Bulgaria) Grigor Dimitrov
- Runner-up: (United States) Devin Britton
- Score: 6–4, 6–3

Events
Singles	men	women		boys	girls
Doubles	men	women	mixed	boys	girls
WC Singles	men	women	quad
WC Doubles	men	women	quad
Legends	men	women	mixed
- US Open

Ričardas Berankis was the defending champion but, no longer competing in junior tennis, did not defend his title.

Grigor Dimitrov won in the final 6–4, 6–3, against Devin Britton.

== Seeds ==
1. (Chinese Taipei) Yang Tsung-hua (semifinals)
2. (Australia) Bernard Tomic (first round)
3. (Bulgaria) Grigor Dimitrov (champion)
4. (Finland) Henri Kontinen (quarterfinals)
5. (Mexico) César Ramírez (second round)
6. (France) Guillaume Rufin (third round)
7. (Brazil) José Pereira (first round)
8. (Brazil) Henrique Cunha (first round)
9. (United States) Ryan Harrison (third round)
10. (Argentina) Juan Vazquez-Valenzuela (second round)
11. (Germany) Cedrik-Marcel Stebe (quarterfinals)
12. (India) Yuki Bhambri (second round)
13. (United States) Bradley Klahn (third round)
14. (El Salvador) Marcelo Arévalo (third round)
15. (Thailand) Peerakit Siributwong (third round)
16. (withdrew)

== Draw ==
Key

- Q = Qualifier
- WC = Wild card
- LL = Lucky loser
- Alt = Alternate
- ITF = ITF entry
- PR = Protected ranking
- SR = Special ranking
- SE = Special exempt
- JE = Junior exempt
- JR = Junior Accelerator Programme entrant
- CO = College Accelerator Programme entrant
- NG = Next Gen Accelerator Program entrant
- w/o = Walkover
- r = Retired
- d = Defaulted

=== Finals ===
Quarterfinals
1	(Chinese Taipei) Yang Tsung-hua	6	6^{5}	6
WC	(United States) Rhyne Williams	3	7^{7}	3
3	(Bulgaria) Grigor Dimitrov	6	6
(United States) Chase Buchanan	4	3
(Serbia) Filip Krajinović	7^{8}	7^{7}
4	(Finland) Henri Kontinen	6^{6}	6^{5}
11	(Germany) Cedrik-Marcel Stebe	3	6	3
Q	(United States) Devin Britton	6	3	6

Semifinals
1	(Chinese Taipei) Yang Tsung-hua	3	7	2
3	(Bulgaria) Grigor Dimitrov	6	5	6
(Serbia) Filip Krajinović	6	4	2
Q	(United States) Devin Britton	1	6	6

Final
3	(Bulgaria) Grigor Dimitrov	6	6
Q	(United States) Devin Britton	4	3

=== Top half ===
==== Section 1 ====
First round
1	(Chinese Taipei) Tsung-hua Yang	7^{8}	6
(Austria) Nikolaus Moser	6^{6}	4
WC	(United States) Raymond Sarmiento	6^{3}	6^{3}
Q	(Germany) Dominik Schultz	7^{7}	7^{7}
(United Kingdom) Daniel Smethurst	1	7	7
WC	(United States) Evan King	6	5	5
(Bosnia and Herzegovina) Mirza Bašić	4	3
15	(Thailand) Peerakit Siributwong	6	6
9	(United States) Ryan Harrison	6	6
(France) Adrien Puget	3	2
Q	(Japan) Hiroyasu Ehara	6	7
LL	(United States) James Seal	2	5
WC	(United States) Rhyne Williams	6	6
(Slovenia) Borut Puc	2	4
(Croatia) Marin Draganja	2	4
5	(Mexico) César Ramírez	6	6

Second round
1	(Chinese Taipei) T-h Yang	6	6
Q	(Germany) D Schultz	1	1
(United Kingdom) D Smethurst	3	2
15	(Thailand) P Siributwong	6	6
9	(United States) R Harrison	6	3	6
Q	(Japan) H Ehara	1	6	2
WC	(United States) R Williams	7	7^{7}
5	(Mexico) C Ramírez	5	6^{2}

Third round
1	(Chinese Taipei) T-h Yang	3	6	6
15	(Thailand) P Siributwong	6	2	1
9	(United States) R Harrison	7^{7}	5	3
WC	(United States) R Williams	6^{5}	7	6

Quarterfinals
1	(Chinese Taipei) T-h Yang	6	6^{5}	6
WC	(United States) R Williams	3	7^{7}	3

==== Section 2 ====
First round
3	(Bulgaria) Grigor Dimitrov	6	6
Q	(France) Julien Obry	2	2
(United States) Ty D Trombetta	6	6
(Colombia) Juan-Carlos Spir	3	1
Q	(Dominican Republic) José Hernández	2	2
(Australia) Matt Reid	6	6
LL	(Germany) Richard Becker	4	4
14	(El Salvador) Marcelo Arévalo	6	6
10	(Argentina) Juan Vazquez-Valenzuela	6	6
(United States) Tennys Sandgren	4	2
(Russia) Mikhail Biryukov	4	2
(United States) Chase Buchanan	6	6
(Italy) Alessandro Giannessi	6	6^{5}	7^{7}
Q	(United States) Harry Fowler	4	7^{7}	6^{3}
(United Kingdom) Daniel Cox	5	7^{7}	6
8	(Brazil) Henrique Cunha	7	6^{1}	4

Second round
3	(Bulgaria) G Dimitrov	7	6
(United States) T D Trombetta	5	1
(Australia) M Reid	6	5	4
14	(El Salvador) M Arévalo	1	7	6
10	(Argentina) J Vazquez-Valenzuela	1	0
(United States) C Buchanan	6	6
(Italy) A Giannessi	0	1
(United Kingdom) D Cox	6	6

Third round
3	(Bulgaria) G Dimitrov	6	6
14	(El Salvador) M Arévalo	3	4
(United States) C Buchanan	6	7^{9}
(United Kingdom) D Cox	3	6^{7}

Quarterfinals
3	(Bulgaria) G Dimitrov	6	6
(United States) C Buchanan	4	3

=== Bottom half ===
==== Section 3 ====
First round
6	(France) Guillaume Rufin	6	6
(Slovenia) Blaz Rola	1	1
(Australia) Dane Propoggia	0	2
(United Kingdom) Marcus Willis	6	6
(Serbia) Filip Krajinović	6^{5}	6	4
(United States) Jarmere Jenkins	7^{7}	4	0^{r}
WC	(United States) Denis Kudla	2	7	3
12	(India) Yuki Bhambri	6	5	6
LL	(Puerto Rico) Alex Llompart	6	3	6
WC	(United States) Christian Harrison	4	6	3
WC	(United States) Jordan Cox	6	7^{9}
LL	(Belgium) Yannik Reuter	4	6^{7}
(Croatia) Dino Marcan	6	6
(Egypt) Karim-Mohamed Maamoun	2	2
Q	(Zimbabwe) Takanyi Garanganga	6^{7}	3
4	(Finland) Henri Kontinen	7^{9}	6

Second round
6	(France) G Rufin	3	7	6
(United Kingdom) M Willis	6	5	4
(Serbia) F Krajinović	7^{7}	6
12	(India) Y Bhambri	6^{5}	4
LL	(Puerto Rico) A Llompart	7	6
WC	(United States) J Cox	5	2
(Croatia) D Marcan	3	7^{7}	3
4	(Finland) H Kontinen	6	6^{5}	6

Third round
6	(France) G Rufin	4	6^{3}
(Serbia) F Krajinović	6	7^{7}
LL	(Puerto Rico) A Llompart	3	1
4	(Finland) H Kontinen	6	6

Quarterfinals
(Serbia) F Krajinović	7^{8}	7^{7}
4	(Finland) H Kontinen	6^{6}	6^{5}

==== Section 4 ====
First round
7	(Brazil) José Pereira	2	3
(Argentina) Guido Pella	6	6
(China) Di Wun	6	6
(Austria) Tristan-Samuel Weissborn	3	4
WC	(United States) Alexander Domijan	7^{7}	6
(Thailand) Kittipong Wachiramanowong	6^{3}	4
(Chinese Taipei) Cheng-peng Hsieh	3	2
11	(Germany) Cedrik-Marcel Stebe	6	6
13	(United States) Bradley Klahn	6	6
(Spain) Pablo Carreno-Busta	4	3
WC	(United States) Robert Johannes Van Overbeek	2	5
(Indonesia) Christopher Rungkat	6	7
(Italy) Giacomo Miccini	5	4
Q	(United States) Matthew Kandath	7	6
Q	(United States) Devin Britton	3	6	6
2	(Australia) Bernard Tomic	6	3	2

Second round
(Argentina) G Pella	6	6
(China) D Wun	3	1
WC	(United States) A Domijan	3	6	3
11	(Germany) C-M Stebe	6	4	6
13	(United States) B Klahn	4	6	6
(Indonesia) C Rungkat	6	1	3
Q	(United States) M Kandath	1	4
Q	(United States) D Britton	6	6

Third round
(Argentina) G Pella	0	7	1
11	(Germany) C-M Stebe	6	5	6
13	(United States) B Klahn	4	3
Q	(United States) D Britton	6	6

Quarterfinals
11	(Germany) C-M Stebe	3	6	3
Q	(United States) D Britton	6	3	6
