= 2008 US Open – Women's singles =

Women's singles
- 2008 US Open

Final
- Champion: (United States) Serena Williams
- Runner-up: (Serbia) Jelena Janković
- Score: 6–4, 7–5

Details
- Draw: 128
- Seeds: 32

Events
Singles	men	women		boys	girls
Doubles	men	women	mixed	boys	girls
WC Singles	men	women	quad
WC Doubles	men	women	quad
Legends	men	women	mixed
← 2007 ·	US Open	· 2009 →

Serena Williams defeated Jelena Janković in the final, 6–4, 7–5 to win the women's singles tennis title at the 2008 US Open. It was her third US Open singles title and ninth major singles title overall. This was also Williams' second US Open (and third major overall) won without losing a set during the tournament. With the win, Williams regained the world No. 1 singles ranking for the first time since 2003. Three of the top four seeds were in contention for the No. 1 ranking at the start of the tournament.

Justine Henin was the reigning champion, but she retired from the sport in May 2008.

This was the final singles major appearance for 1998 champion, three-time major champion and former world No. 1 Lindsay Davenport, who was defeated by Marion Bartoli in the third round.

Julie Coin, ranked as the world No. 188, defeated the world No. 1 Ana Ivanovic in the second round, making her the lowest-ranked player ever to defeat an incumbent world No. 1.

== Seeds ==
1. (Serbia) Ana Ivanovic (second round)
2. (Serbia) Jelena Janković (final)
3. (Russia) Svetlana Kuznetsova (third round)
4. (United States) Serena Williams (champion)
5. (Russia) Elena Dementieva (semifinals)
6. (Russia) Dinara Safina (semifinals)
7. (United States) Venus Williams (quarterfinals)
8. (Russia) Vera Zvonareva (second round)
9. (Poland) Agnieszka Radwańska (fourth round)
10. (Russia) Anna Chakvetadze (first round)
11. (Slovakia) Daniela Hantuchová (first round)
12. (France) Marion Bartoli (fourth round)
13. (Hungary) Ágnes Szávay (second round)
14. (Belarus) Victoria Azarenka (third round)
15. (Switzerland) Patty Schnyder (quarterfinals)
16. (Italy) Flavia Pennetta (quarterfinals)

17. (France) Alizé Cornet (third round)
18. (Slovakia) Dominika Cibulková (third round)
19. (Russia) Nadia Petrova (third round)
20. (Czech Republic) Nicole Vaidišová (second round)
21. (Denmark) Caroline Wozniacki (fourth round)
22. (Russia) Maria Kirilenko (first round)
23. (United States) Lindsay Davenport (third round)
24. (Israel) Shahar Pe'er (first round)
25. (Italy) Francesca Schiavone (second round)
26. (Spain) Anabel Medina Garrigues (second round)
27. (Ukraine) Alona Bondarenko (third round)
28. (Slovenia) Katarina Srebotnik (fourth round)
29. (Austria) Sybille Bammer (quarterfinals)
30. (Japan) Ai Sugiyama (third round)
31. (France) Virginie Razzano (first round)
32. (France) Amélie Mauresmo (fourth round)

Click on the seed number of a player to go to their draw section.

== Draw ==
=== Key ===
- Q = Qualifier
- WC = Wild card
- LL = Lucky loser
- Alt = Alternate
- ITF = ITF entry
- PR = Protected ranking
- SR = Special ranking
- SE = Special exempt
- JE = Junior exempt
- JR = Junior Accelerator Programme entrant
- CO = College Accelerator Programme entrant
- NG = Next Gen Accelerator Program entrant
- w/o = Walkover
- r = Retired
- d = Defaulted

=== Finals ===
Quarterfinals
16	(Italy) Flavia Pennetta	2	3
6	(Russia) Dinara Safina	6	6
4	(United States) Serena Williams	7^{8}	7^{9}
7	(United States) Venus Williams	6^{6}	6^{7}
5	(Russia) Elena Dementieva	6	6
15	(Switzerland) Patty Schnyder	2	3
29	(Austria) Sybille Bammer	1	4
2	(Serbia) Jelena Janković	6	6

Semifinals
6	(Russia) Dinara Safina	3	2
4	(United States) Serena Williams	6	6
5	(Russia) Elena Dementieva	4	4
2	(Serbia) Jelena Janković	6	6

Final
4	(United States) Serena Williams	6	7
2	(Serbia) Jelena Janković	4	5

=== Top half ===
==== Section 1 ====
First round
1	(Serbia) A Ivanovic	6	4	6
(Russia) V Dushevina	1	6	4
Q	(France) J Coin	7	7
(Australia) C Dellacqua	6^{6}	6^{4}
(Estonia) K Kanepi	6	6
(Romania) M Niculescu	0	3
(France) N Dechy	6	3	2
32	(France) A Mauresmo	4	6	6
19	(Russia) N Petrova	6	6
(France) O Sanchez	2	4
Q	(Chinese Taipei) S-w Hsieh	6	6
(Russia) E Rodina	2	4
(China) S Peng	6	6
(Greece) E Daniilidou	1	0
Q	(Switzerland) S Vögele	6	2	2
16	(Italy) F Pennetta	2	6	6

Second round
1	(Serbia) A Ivanovic	3	6	3
Q	(France) J Coin	6	4	6
(Estonia) K Kanepi	6	4	0
32	(France) A Mauresmo	2	6	6
19	(Russia) N Petrova	6	6
Q	(Chinese Taipei) S-w Hsieh	4	2
(China) S Peng	2	7	1
16	(Italy) F Pennetta	6	6^{8}	6

Third round
Q	(France) J Coin	4	4
32	(France) A Mauresmo	6	6
19	(Russia) N Petrova	6	4	3
16	(Italy) F Pennetta	4	6	6

Fourth round
32	(France) A Mauresmo	3	0
16	(Italy) F Pennetta	6	6

==== Section 2 ====
First round
11	(Slovakia) D Hantuchová	4	2
Q	(Germany) A-L Grönefeld	6	6
WC	(Australia) J Moore	7	7
WC	(United States) M Oudin	6^{5}	6^{5}
(Poland) M Domachowska	7	5	4
(United States) B Mattek	6^{7}	7	6
(France) C Pin	5	0
17	(France) A Cornet	7	6
31	(France) V Razzano	4	1
(Switzerland) T Bacsinszky	6	6
(Russia) A Kudryavtseva	6	5	3
(Chinese Taipei) Y-j Chan	4	7	6
(France) S Cohen-Aloro	1	4
Q	(Italy) R Vinci	6	6
Q	(United States) K Ahn	3	4
6	(Russia) D Safina	6	6

Second round
Q	(Germany) A-L Grönefeld	6	6
WC	(Australia) J Moore	1	3
(United States) B Mattek	6^{5}	1
17	(France) A Cornet	7	6
(Switzerland) T Bacsinszky	6	6
(Chinese Taipei) Y-j Chan	3	2
Q	(Italy) R Vinci	4	3
6	(Russia) D Safina	6	6

Third round
Q	(Germany) A-L Grönefeld	6	7
17	(France) A Cornet	4	5
(Switzerland) T Bacsinszky	6	5	2
6	(Russia) D Safina	3	7	6

Fourth round
Q	(Germany) A-L Grönefeld	5	0
6	(Russia) D Safina	7	6

==== Section 3 ====
First round
4	(United States) S Williams	6	6
(Ukraine) K Bondarenko	1	4
(Russia) E Vesnina	4	6	6
(Ukraine) J Vakulenko	6	1	2
(Belarus) O Govortsova	6	6
Q	(Czech Republic) S Záhlavová	3	1
(Slovenia) A Klepač	6	3	2^{r}
30	(Japan) A Sugiyama	4	6	4
20	(Czech Republic) N Vaidišová	6	6
(Czech Republic) P Cetkovská	1	2
WC	(France) S Brémond	7	6
(Germany) J Görges	6^{0}	4
(Estonia) M Ani	0	6^{5}
(Italy) T Garbin	6	7
WC	(United States) G Brodsky	5	3
13	(Hungary) Á Szávay	7	6

Second round
4	(United States) S Williams	6	6
(Russia) E Vesnina	1	1
(Belarus) O Govortsova	6	6^{4}	1
30	(Japan) A Sugiyama	4	7	6
20	(Czech Republic) N Vaidišová	5	3
WC	(France) S Brémond	7	6
(Italy) T Garbin	5	6	6
13	(Hungary) Á Szávay	7	2	3

Third round
4	(United States) S Williams	6	6
30	(Japan) A Sugiyama	2	1
WC	(France) S Brémond	7	3	6
(Italy) T Garbin	5	6	4

Fourth round
4	(United States) S Williams	6	6
WC	(France) S Brémond	2	2

==== Section 4 ====
First round
9	(Poland) A Radwańska	6	6
Q	(Kazakhstan) Y Shvedova	4	2
(Thailand) T Tanasugarn	6	3	2
LL	(Colombia) M Duque Mariño	0	6	6
Q	(Romania) IR Olaru	6	6
(Romania) E Gallovits	0	2
(United States) J Craybas	3	6^{4}
18	(Slovakia) D Cibulková	6	7
27	(Ukraine) A Bondarenko	2	6	6
WC	(United States) J Jackson	6	3	2
(Spain) MJ Martínez Sánchez	3	4
(Germany) S Lisicki	6	6
Q	(Czech Republic) H Šromová	3	6	3
Q	(Paraguay) R de los Ríos	6	2	6
(Australia) S Stosur	2	3
7	(United States) V Williams	6	6

Second round
9	(Poland) A Radwańska	6	7
LL	(Colombia) M Duque Mariño	0	6^{3}
Q	(Romania) IR Olaru	2	2
18	(Slovakia) D Cibulková	6	6
27	(Ukraine) A Bondarenko	6	1	6
(Germany) S Lisicki	4	6	4
Q	(Paraguay) R de los Ríos	0	3
7	(United States) V Williams	6	6

Third round
9	(Poland) A Radwańska	6	6
18	(Slovakia) D Cibulková	0	3
27	(Ukraine) A Bondarenko	2	1
7	(United States) V Williams	6	6

Fourth round
9	(Poland) A Radwańska	1	3
7	(United States) V Williams	6	6

=== Bottom half ===
==== Section 5 ====
First round
5	(Russia) E Dementieva	6	7
(Uzbekistan) A Amanmuradova	4	5
(France) P Parmentier	6	7
(New Zealand) M Erakovic	3	6^{2}
Q	(United States) A Glatch	2	2
(United Kingdom) A Keothavong	6	6
(Spain) N Llagostera Vives	5	5
25	(Italy) F Schiavone	7	7
24	(Israel) S Pe'er	6	0	1
(China) N Li	2	6	6
(Croatia) J Kostanić Tošić	4	2
(Italy) S Errani	6	6
(Russia) E Bychkova	6	6
(Australia) A Rodionova	1	3
(Russia) E Makarova	1	6	6
10	(Russia) A Chakvetadze	6	2	3

Second round
5	(Russia) E Dementieva	6	6
(France) P Parmentier	2	1
(United Kingdom) A Keothavong	6	3	6
25	(Italy) F Schiavone	2	6	4
(China) N Li	4	6	6
(Italy) S Errani	6	2	0
(Russia) E Bychkova	6	5	3
(Russia) E Makarova	3	7	6

Third round
5	(Russia) E Dementieva	6	6
(United Kingdom) A Keothavong	3	4
(China) N Li	6	4	6
(Russia) E Makarova	1	6	2

Fourth round
5	(Russia) E Dementieva	6	6
(China) N Li	4	1

==== Section 6 ====
First round
15	(Switzerland) P Schnyder	6	3	6
Q	(Russia) A Pivovarova	3	6	3
(United States) V King	2	6	2
(Russia) A Pavlyuchenkova	6	4	6
(Argentina) G Dulko	4	0
(Slovakia) M Rybáriková	6	6
(Austria) T Paszek	6	3	6
22	(Russia) M Kirilenko	3	6	4
28	(Slovenia) K Srebotnik	3	6	6
(Belgium) Y Wickmayer	6	0	3
(Spain) L Domínguez Lino	1	2
(Austria) Y Meusburger	6	6
(Czech Republic) L Šafářová	4	6	2
(Romania) S Cîrstea	6	4	6
Q	(China) S Zhang	4	2
3	(Russia) S Kuznetsova	6	6

Second round
15	(Switzerland) P Schnyder	6	6
(Russia) A Pavlyuchenkova	3	3
(Slovakia) M Rybáriková	6	6
(Austria) T Paszek	1	2
28	(Slovenia) K Srebotnik	6	6
(Austria) Y Meusburger	1	3
(Romania) S Cîrstea	6^{3}	1
3	(Russia) S Kuznetsova	7	6

Third round
15	(Switzerland) P Schnyder	7	6
(Slovakia) M Rybáriková	6^{4}	4
28	(Slovenia) K Srebotnik	6	6^{1}	6
3	(Russia) S Kuznetsova	3	7	3

Fourth round
15	(Switzerland) P Schnyder	4	6	6
28	(Slovenia) K Srebotnik	6	3	3

==== Section 7 ====
First round
8	(Russia) V Zvonareva	6	6
(Czech Republic) B Záhlavová-Strýcová	4	3
(Ukraine) T Perebiynis	6	6
(Ukraine) M Koryttseva	1	4
(France) A Rezaï	6	6
WC	(United States) A Muhammad	2	4
(Japan) A Nakamura	4	2
29	(Austria) S Bammer	6	6
23	(United States) L Davenport	6	6
(Canada) A Wozniak	4	2
(Russia) A Kleybanova	6	7
(Spain) C Suárez Navarro	2	5
(Czech Republic) P Kvitová	7	4	2
(Spain) V Ruano Pascual	6^{3}	6	6
(Russia) G Voskoboeva	2	3
12	(France) M Bartoli	6	6

Second round
8	(Russia) V Zvonareva	3	3
(Ukraine) T Perebiynis	6	6
(France) A Rezaï	1	5
29	(Austria) S Bammer	6	7
23	(United States) L Davenport	7	6
(Russia) A Kleybanova	5	3
(Spain) V Ruano Pascual	4	2
12	(France) M Bartoli	6	6

Third round
(Ukraine) T Perebiynis	3	0
29	(Austria) S Bammer	6	6
23	(United States) L Davenport	1	6^{3}
12	(France) M Bartoli	6	7

Fourth round
29	(Austria) S Bammer	7	0	6
12	(France) M Bartoli	6^{3}	6	4

==== Section 8 ====
First round
14	(Belarus) V Azarenka	6	6
(Czech Republic) K Zakopalová	2	1
(Italy) K Knapp	0	3
(Czech Republic) I Benešová	6	6
(France) É Loit	0	2
Q	(Italy) ME Camerin	6	6
WC	(United States) A Rolle	2	1
21	(Denmark) C Wozniacki	6	6
26	(Spain) A Medina Garrigues	6	7
(Bulgaria) T Pironkova	4	5
(China) J Zheng	6	6
Q	(United States) S Perry	2	3
(China) Z Yan	2	4
(Sweden) S Arvidsson	6	6
WC	(United States) C Vandeweghe	3	1
2	(Serbia) J Janković	6	6

Second round
14	(Belarus) V Azarenka	6	6
(Czech Republic) I Benešová	2	3
Q	(Italy) ME Camerin	1	2
21	(Denmark) C Wozniacki	6	6
26	(Spain) A Medina Garrigues	1	4
(China) J Zheng	6	6
(Sweden) S Arvidsson	3	7	5
2	(Serbia) J Janković	6	6^{5}	7

Third round
14	(Belarus) V Azarenka	4	4
21	(Denmark) C Wozniacki	6	6
(China) J Zheng	5	5
2	(Serbia) J Janković	7	7

Fourth round
21	(Denmark) C Wozniacki	6	2	1
2	(Serbia) J Janković	3	6	6

== Championship match statistics ==
Category	(United States) S. Williams	(Serbia) Janković
1st serve %	45/73 (62%)	65/95 (68%)
1st serve points won	27 of 45 = 60%	35 of 65 = 54%
2nd serve points won	15 of 28 = 54%	13 of 30 = 43%
Total service points won	42 of 73 = 57.53%	48 of 95 = 50.53%
Aces	3	3
Double faults	3	4
Winners	44	15
Unforced errors	39	22
Net points won	32 of 37 = 86%	11 of 17 = 65%
Break points converted	5 of 16 = 31%	3 of 8 = 38%
Return points won	47 of 95 = 49%	31 of 73 = 42%
Total points won	89	79

Preceded by 2008 Wimbledon Championships – Women's singles	Grand Slam women's singles	Succeeded by 2009 Australian Open – Women's singles
