= 2008 US Open – Men's doubles =

Men's doubles
- 2008 US Open

Final
- Champion: (United States) Bob Bryan (United States) Mike Bryan
- Runner-up: (Czech Republic) Lukáš Dlouhý (India) Leander Paes
- Score: 7–6^{(7–5)}, 7–6^{(12–10)}

Details
- Draw: 64
- Seeds: 16

Events
Singles	men	women		boys	girls
Doubles	men	women	mixed	boys	girls
WC Singles	men	women	quad
WC Doubles	men	women	quad
Legends	men	women	mixed
← 2007 ·	US Open	· 2009 →

Bob Bryan and Mike Bryan defeated Lukáš Dlouhý and Leander Paes in the final, 7–6^{(7–5)}, 7–6^{(12–10)} to win the men's doubles tennis title at the 2008 US Open. The pair did not lose a set during the tournament.

Simon Aspelin and Julian Knowle were the defending champions, but lost in the second round to Igor Kunitsyn and Dmitry Tursunov.

== Seeds ==
1. (Canada) Daniel Nestor / (Serbia) Nenad Zimonjić (third round)
2. (United States) Bob Bryan / (United States) Mike Bryan (champions)
3. (Israel) Jonathan Erlich / (Israel) Andy Ram (second round)
4. (India) Mahesh Bhupathi / (The Bahamas) Mark Knowles (third round)
5. (Sweden) Jonas Björkman / (Zimbabwe) Kevin Ullyett (second round)
6. (Sweden) Simon Aspelin / (Austria) Julian Knowle (second round)
7. (Czech Republic) Lukáš Dlouhý / (India) Leander Paes (final)
8. (Poland) Mariusz Fyrstenberg / (Poland) Marcin Matkowski (first round)
9. (Australia) Paul Hanley / (Australia) Jordan Kerr (first round)
10. (France) Arnaud Clément / (France) Michaël Llodra (first round, retired)
11. (Czech Republic) Martin Damm / (Czech Republic) Pavel Vízner (third round)
12. (Uruguay) Pablo Cuevas / (Peru) Luis Horna (second round)
13. (South Africa) Jeff Coetzee / (Netherlands) Rogier Wassen (first round)
14. (Belarus) Max Mirnyi / (United Kingdom) Jamie Murray (first round)
15. (Brazil) Marcelo Melo / (Brazil) André Sá (third round)
16. (France) Julien Benneteau / (France) Nicolas Mahut (second round)

== Draw ==
=== Key ===
- Q = Qualifier
- WC = Wild card
- LL = Lucky loser
- Alt = Alternate
- ITF = ITF entry
- PR = Protected ranking
- SR = Special ranking
- SE = Special exempt
- JE = Junior exempt
- JR = Junior Accelerator Programme entrant
- CO = College Accelerator Programme entrant
- NG = Next Gen Accelerator Program entrant
- w/o = Walkover
- r = Retired
- d = Defaulted

=== Finals ===
Quarterfinals
(Sweden) Robert Lindstedt (Finland) Jarkko Nieminen	3	7	3
7	(Czech Republic) Lukáš Dlouhý (India) Leander Paes	6	6^{2}	6
(Argentina) Máximo González (Argentina) Juan Mónaco	6	6^{3}	6
(Brazil) Bruno Soares (Serbia) Dušan Vemić	2	7	3
(Spain) Feliciano López (Spain) Fernando Verdasco	4	6^{5}
(Spain) Tommy Robredo (Argentina) Sergio Roitman	6	7
(Germany) Christopher Kas (Germany) Philipp Petzschner	6^{14}	4
2	(United States) Bob Bryan (United States) Mike Bryan	7	6

Semifinals
7	(Czech Republic) Lukáš Dlouhý (India) Leander Paes	6	6
(Argentina) Máximo González (Argentina) Juan Mónaco	2	0
(Spain) Tommy Robredo (Argentina) Sergio Roitman	2	1
2	(United States) Bob Bryan (United States) Mike Bryan	6	6

Final
7	(Czech Republic) Lukáš Dlouhý (India) Leander Paes	6^{5}	6^{10}
2	(United States) Bob Bryan (United States) Mike Bryan	7	7

=== Top half ===
==== Section 1 ====
First round
1	(Canada) D Nestor (Serbia) N Zimonjić	6	7
Alt	(Chinese Taipei) Y-h Lu (United States) J Thomas	2	6^{4}
(United Kingdom) R Hutchins (United Kingdom) A Murray	6	1	6
(Thailand) S Ratiwatana (Thailand) S Ratiwatana	3	6	4
(Sweden) R Lindstedt (Finland) J Nieminen	5	6	6
WC	(United States) J Levine (United States) D Young	7	2	4
(Italy) F Fognini (Ecuador) N Lapentti	2	6	2
16	(France) J Benneteau (France) N Mahut	6	3	6
12	(Uruguay) P Cuevas (Peru) L Horna	6	6
(Argentina) J Acasuso (Argentina) S Prieto	4	2
(South Africa) R de Voest (Australia) A Fisher	6	6
(South Africa) C Haggard (Australia) S Huss	1	4
(Germany) D Gremelmayr (Serbia) V Troicki	6^{4}	1
(Argentina) E Schwank (Italy) P Starace	7	6
(Spain) Ó Hernández (Spain) Montañés	7	1	4
7	(Czech Republic) L Dlouhý (India) L Paes	6^{2}	6	6

Second round
1	(Canada) D Nestor (Serbia) N Zimonjić	7	3	7
(United Kingdom) R Hutchins (United Kingdom) A Murray	5	6	6^{2}
(Sweden) R Lindstedt (Finland) J Nieminen	6	7
16	(France) J Benneteau (France) N Mahut	2	6^{6}
12	(Uruguay) P Cuevas (Peru) L Horna	6^{3}	2
(South Africa) R de Voest (Australia) A Fisher	7	6
(Argentina) E Schwank (Italy) P Starace	4	6	3
7	(Czech Republic) L Dlouhý (India) L Paes	6	1	6

Third round
1	(Canada) D Nestor (Serbia) N Zimonjić	4	7	2
(Sweden) R Lindstedt (Finland) J Nieminen	6	6^{11}	6
(South Africa) R de Voest (Australia) A Fisher	3	3
7	(Czech Republic) L Dlouhý (India) L Paes	6	6

Quarterfinals
(Sweden) R Lindstedt (Finland) J Nieminen	3	7	3
7	(Czech Republic) L Dlouhý (India) L Paes	6	6^{2}	6

==== Section 2 ====
First round
4	(India) M Bhupathi (The Bahamas) M Knowles	6	6
(Sweden) J Brunström (Sweden) T Johansson	3	4
(Russia) T Gabashvili (Croatia) I Karlović	6^{8}	3
(Switzerland) Y Allegro (Romania) H Tecău	7	6
WC	(United States) A Delic (United States) A Kuznetsov	6	6^{6}	6
WC	(United States) R Ginepri (United States) T Rettenmaier	4	7	4
(Argentina) M González (Argentina) J Mónaco	6	6
13	(South Africa) J Coetzee (Netherlands) R Wassen	1	4
9	(Australia) P Hanley (Australia) J Kerr	6^{5}	6^{5}
(Brazil) B Soares (Serbia) D Vemić	7	7
(United States) R Ram (United States) B Reynolds	7	6^{3}	6
(United States) S Lipsky (United States) D Martin	6^{5}	7	3
(Belgium) S Darcis (Belgium) O Rochus	6^{2}	4
(Russia) I Kunitsyn (Russia) D Tursunov	7	6
(Germany) M Kohlmann (Austria) A Peya	5	1
6	(Sweden) S Aspelin (Austria) J Knowle	7	6

Second round
4	(India) M Bhupathi (The Bahamas) M Knowles	6	6
(Switzerland) Y Allegro (Romania) H Tecău	3	3
WC	(United States) A Delic (United States) A Kuznetsov	6	4	3
(Argentina) M González (Argentina) J Mónaco	1	6	6
(Brazil) B Soares (Serbia) D Vemić	7	6
(United States) R Ram (United States) B Reynolds	6^{4}	1
(Russia) I Kunitsyn (Russia) D Tursunov	6	1	6
6	(Sweden) S Aspelin (Austria) J Knowle	2	6	4

Third round
4	(India) M Bhupathi (The Bahamas) M Knowles	6	4	4
(Argentina) M González (Argentina) J Mónaco	2	6	6
(Brazil) B Soares (Serbia) D Vemić	7	6^{7}	7
(Russia) I Kunitsyn (Russia) D Tursunov	6^{9}	7	6^{3}

Quarterfinals
(Argentina) M González (Argentina) J Mónaco	6	6^{3}	6
(Brazil) B Soares (Serbia) D Vemić	2	7	3

=== Bottom half ===
==== Section 3 ====
First round
8	(Poland) M Fyrstenberg (Poland) M Matkowski	3	2
(Russia) I Andreev (Germany) M Zverev	6	6
(France) M Gicquel (France) S Grosjean	7	6
(India) R Bopanna (Pakistan) A-u-H Qureshi	5	3
(Argentina) L Arnold Ker (Argentina) G Cañas	6	6
(United States) J Cerretani (Romania) V Hănescu	3	2
(Spain) F López (Spain) F Verdasco	6	2
10	(France) A Clément (France) M Llodra	3	1	r
15	(Brazil) M Melo (Brazil) A Sá	6	6
(Spain) M Granollers (Spain) S Ventura	1	2
(United States) T Parrott (Slovakia) F Polášek	5	6^{3}
(Austria) J Melzer (Germany) R Schüttler	7	7
WC	(United States) C Buchanan (United States) R Harrison	2	2
(Spain) T Robredo (Argentina) S Roitman	6	6
WC	(United States) R Kendrick (United States) R Sweeting	4	3
3	(Israel) J Erlich (Israel) A Ram	6	6

Second round
(Russia) I Andreev (Germany) M Zverev	7	1	3
(France) M Gicquel (France) S Grosjean	5	6	6
(Argentina) L Arnold Ker (Argentina) G Cañas	6	3	6^{4}
(Spain) F López (Spain) F Verdasco	2	6	7
15	(Brazil) M Melo (Brazil) A Sá	6	7
(Austria) J Melzer (Germany) R Schüttler	3	6^{0}
(Spain) T Robredo (Argentina) S Roitman	6	7
3	(Israel) J Erlich (Israel) A Ram	2	5

Third round
(France) M Gicquel (France) S Grosjean	6	3	3
(Spain) F López (Spain) F Verdasco	3	6	6
15	(Brazil) M Melo (Brazil) A Sá	2	4
(Spain) T Robredo (Argentina) S Roitman	6	6

Quarterfinals
(Spain) F López (Spain) F Verdasco	4	6^{5}
(Spain) T Robredo (Argentina) S Roitman	6	7

==== Section 4 ====
First round
5	(Sweden) J Björkman (Zimbabwe) K Ullyett	6	6
(Spain) G García López (Spain) I Navarro	4	3
(Italy) S Bolelli (Italy) A Seppi	6	3	2
(Germany) C Kas (Germany) P Petzschner	4	6	6
WC	(United States) M McClune (United States) K Van't Hof	5	6	6
(United States) E Butorac (Czech Republic) J Levinský	7	3	4
(France) J Chardy (France) G Simon	7	4	4
11	(Czech Republic) M Damm (Czech Republic) P Vízner	6^{4}	6	6
14	(Belarus) M Mirnyi (United Kingdom) J Murray	6^{1}	6^{8}
(Slovakia) M Mertiňák (Croatia) L Zovko	7	7
WC	(United States) J Isner (United States) S Querrey	4	5
(Argentina) A Calleri (Chile) F González	6	7
(France) N Devilder (France) P-H Mathieu	6	5	1
(Slovakia) D Hrbatý (Czech Republic) D Škoch	3	7	6
(Spain) N Almagro (Spain) P Andújar	3	2
2	(United States) B Bryan (United States) M Bryan	6	6

Second round
5	(Sweden) J Björkman (Zimbabwe) K Ullyett	7	1	6^{3}
(Germany) C Kas (Germany) P Petzschner	6^{2}	6	7
WC	(United States) M McClune (United States) K Van't Hof	0	0
11	(Czech Republic) M Damm (Czech Republic) P Vízner	6	6
(Slovakia) M Mertiňák (Croatia) L Zovko	w/o
(Argentina) A Calleri (Chile) F González
(Slovakia) D Hrbatý (Czech Republic) D Škoch	6^{2}	1
2	(United States) B Bryan (United States) M Bryan	7	6

Third round
(Germany) C Kas (Germany) P Petzschner	6	7
11	(Czech Republic) M Damm (Czech Republic) P Vízner	3	6^{6}
(Slovakia) M Mertiňák (Croatia) L Zovko	3	2
2	(United States) B Bryan (United States) M Bryan	6	6

Quarterfinals
(Germany) C Kas (Germany) P Petzschner	6^{14}	4
2	(United States) B Bryan (United States) M Bryan	7	6
