= 2008 US Open – Women's doubles =

Women's doubles
- 2008 US Open

Final
- Champions: (Zimbabwe) Cara Black (United States) Liezel Huber
- Runners-up: (United States) Lisa Raymond (Australia) Samantha Stosur
- Score: 6–3, 7–6^{(8–6)}

Details
- Draw: 64 (7 WC )
- Seeds: 16

Events
Singles	men	women		boys	girls
Doubles	men	women	mixed	boys	girls
WC Singles	men	women	quad
WC Doubles	men	women	quad
Legends	men	women	mixed
← 2007 ·	US Open	· 2009 →

Nathalie Dechy and Dinara Safina were the defending champions, but Safina chose not to participate, and only Dechy competed that year.
Dechy partnered with Casey Dellacqua, but lost in the first round to Klaudia Jans and Alicja Rosolska.

Cara Black and Liezel Huber won in the final 6–3, 7–6^{(8–6)}, against Lisa Raymond and Samantha Stosur.

== Seeds ==
1. (Zimbabwe) Cara Black / (United States) Liezel Huber (champions)
2. (Czech Republic) Květa Peschke / (Australia) Rennae Stubbs (first round)
3. (Chinese Taipei) Chan Yung-jan / (Chinese Taipei) Chuang Chia-jung (first round)
4. (Slovenia) Katarina Srebotnik / (Japan) Ai Sugiyama (semifinals)
5. (Spain) Anabel Medina Garrigues / (Spain) Virginia Ruano Pascual (semifinals)
6. (Belarus) Victoria Azarenka / (Israel) Shahar Pe'er (first round)
7. (Ukraine) Alona Bondarenko / (Ukraine) Kateryna Bondarenko (third round)
8. (China) Yan Zi / (China) Zheng Jie (quarterfinals)
9. (France) Nathalie Dechy / (Australia) Casey Dellacqua (first round)
10. (United States) Lisa Raymond / (Australia) Samantha Stosur (final)
11. (Slovakia) Janette Husárová / (China) Peng Shuai (third round)
12. (Czech Republic) Iveta Benešová / (Russia) Galina Voskoboeva (second round)
13. (Russia) Elena Vesnina / (Russia) Vera Zvonareva (second round)
14. (Spain) Nuria Llagostera Vives / (Spain) María José Martínez Sánchez (second round)
15. (Russia) Maria Kirilenko / (Italy) Flavia Pennetta (first round)
16. (Czech Republic) Eva Hrdinová / (Czech Republic) Vladimíra Uhlířová (first round)

== Draw ==
=== Key ===
- Q = Qualifier
- WC = Wild card
- LL = Lucky loser
- Alt = Alternate
- ITF = ITF entry
- PR = Protected ranking
- SR = Special ranking
- SE = Special exempt
- JE = Junior exempt
- JR = Junior Accelerator Programme entrant
- CO = College Accelerator Programme entrant
- NG = Next Gen Accelerator Program entrant
- w/o = Walkover
- r = Retired
- d = Defaulted

=== Finals ===
Quarterfinals
1	(Zimbabwe) Cara Black (United States) Liezel Huber	6	6
8	(China) Yan Zi (China) Zheng Jie	4	3
(United States) Raquel Kops-Jones (United States) Abigail Spears	6	3	6^{2}
5	(Spain) Anabel Medina Garrigues (Spain) Virginia Ruano Pascual	2	6	7
(Slovakia) Dominika Cibulková (France) Virginie Razzano	1	6	3
4	(Slovenia) Katarina Srebotnik (Japan) Ai Sugiyama	6	4	6
10	(United States) Lisa Raymond (Australia) Samantha Stosur	7	6
(New Zealand) Marina Erakovic (Croatia) Jelena Kostanić Tošić	6^{3}	0

Semifinals
1	(Zimbabwe) Cara Black (United States) Liezel Huber	6	6
5	(Spain) Anabel Medina Garrigues (Spain) Virginia Ruano Pascual	1	4
4	(Slovenia) Katarina Srebotnik (Japan) Ai Sugiyama	5	1
10	(United States) Lisa Raymond (Australia) Samantha Stosur	7	6

Final
1	(Zimbabwe) Cara Black (United States) Liezel Huber	6	7
10	(United States) Lisa Raymond (Australia) Samantha Stosur	3	6^{6}

=== Top half ===
==== Section 1 ====
First round
1	(Zimbabwe) C Black (United States) L Huber	6	6
(Czech Republic) P Cetkovská (Belgium) Y Wickmayer	0	4
(Czech Republic) L Hradecká (Czech Republic) R Voráčová	7	6
WC	(United States) C Fusano (United States) S Perry	6^{4}	2
WC	(United States) J Ditty (United States) C Gullickson	7	6
(Kazakhstan) Y Shvedova (Thailand) T Tanasugarn	5	1
(Italy) T Garbin (Austria) T Paszek	4	6	6
15	(Russia) M Kirilenko (Italy) F Pennetta	6	3	4
11	(Slovakia) J Husárová (China) S Peng	6	6
(Sweden) S Arvidsson (Tunisia) S Sfar	4	1
(Latvia) L Dekmeijere (Bulgaria) T Pironkova	7	6
WC	(United States) A Haynes (United States) A Rolle	5	2
(Czech Republic) L Šafářová (Italy) M Santangelo	6	6
(United Kingdom) A Keothavong (Russia) A Pavlyuchenkova	3	4
(Poland) A Radwańska (Poland) U Radwańska	6	3	2
8	(China) Z Yan (China) J Zheng	3	6	6

Second round
1	(Zimbabwe) C Black (United States) L Huber	6	6
(Czech Republic) L Hradecká (Czech Republic) R Voráčová	4	1
WC	(United States) J Ditty (United States) C Gullickson	7	6
(Italy) T Garbin (Austria) T Paszek	5	4
11	(Slovakia) J Husárová (China) S Peng	7	6
(Latvia) L Dekmeijere (Bulgaria) T Pironkova	5	1
(Czech Republic) L Šafářová (Italy) M Santangelo	2	4
8	(China) Z Yan (China) J Zheng	6	6

Third round
1	(Zimbabwe) C Black (United States) L Huber	6	6
WC	(United States) J Ditty (United States) C Gullickson	2	2
11	(Slovakia) J Husárová (China) S Peng	6	3	1
8	(China) Z Yan (China) J Zheng	4	6	6

Quarterfinals
1	(Zimbabwe) C Black (United States) L Huber	6	6
8	(China) Z Yan (China) J Zheng	4	3

==== Section 2 ====
First round
3	(Chinese Taipei) Y-j Chan (Chinese Taipei) C-j Chuang	5	1
(United States) R Kops-Jones (United States) A Spears	7	6
(Russia) E Likhovtseva (Russia) E Rodina	6	6^{5}	6
(Colombia) C Castaño (Estonia) K Kanepi	2	7	4
(Spain) C Suárez Navarro (Spain) A Parra Santonja	3	4
WC	(United States) T Lin (United States) R Zalameda	6	6
(France) S Foretz (France) C Pin	4	6	6
16	(Czech Republic) E Hrdinová (Czech Republic) V Uhlířová	6	2	4
9	(France) N Dechy (Australia) C Dellacqua	6	2	3
(Poland) K Jans (Poland) A Rosolska	1	6	6
WC	(United States) A Muhammed (United States) M Oudin	1	4
(Romania) S Cîrstea (Romania) M Niculescu	6	6
(Poland) M Domachowska (Denmark) C Wozniacki	6	6
(Austria) S Bammer (Germany) M Müller	1	4
(Japan) R Fujiwara (Chinese Taipei) S-w Hsieh	6^{4}	4
5	(Spain) A Medina Garrigues (Spain) V Ruano Pascual	7	6

Second round
(United States) R Kops-Jones (United States) A Spears	w/o
(Russia) E Likhovtseva (Russia) E Rodina
WC	(United States) T Lin (United States) R Zalameda	3	3
(France) S Foretz (France) C Pin	6	6
(Poland) K Jans (Poland) A Rosolska	7	2	6
(Romania) S Cirstea (Romania) M Niculescu	6^{6}	6	2
(Poland) M Domachowska (Denmark) C Wozniacki	2	3
5	(Spain) A Medina Garrigues (Spain) V Ruano Pascual	6	6

Third round
(United States) R Kops-Jones (United States) A Spears	6	7
(France) S Foretz (France) C Pin	4	6^{1}
(Poland) K Jans (Poland) A Rosolska	3	3
5	(Spain) A Medina Garrigues (Spain) V Ruano Pascual	6	6

Quarterfinals
(United States) R Kops-Jones (United States) A Spears	6	3	6^{2}
5	(Spain) A Medina Garrigues (Spain) V Ruano Pascual	2	6	7

=== Bottom half ===
==== Section 3 ====
First round
6	(Belarus) V Azarenka (Israel) S Pe'er	5	6	2
(Russia) N Petrova (Italy) F Schiavone	7	3	6
(Germany) A-L Grönefeld (Switzerland) P Schnyder	7	6
(United States) V King (Russia) A Kudryavtseva	5	3
(Switzerland) T Bacsinszky (France) A Cornet	6	5	3
(Slovakia) D Cibulková (France) V Razzano	1	7	6
(Czech Republic) P Kvitová (Czech Republic) G Navrátilová	7	2	2
12	(Czech Republic) I Benešová (Russia) G Voskoboeva	5	6	6
13	(Russia) E Vesnina (Russia) V Zvonareva	7	6
(United States) J Craybas (Belarus) O Govortsova	5	2
(Ukraine) M Koryttseva (Ukraine) T Perebiynis	2	6^{1}
(United States) L Davenport (Slovakia) D Hantuchová	6	7
(Germany) S Lisicki (France) A Rezaï	6	6^{5}	6
(Slovakia) M Rybáriková (Turkey) I Senoglu	3	7	4
(Italy) S Errani (Italy) K Knapp	2	3
4	(Slovenia) K Srebotnik (Japan) A Sugiyama	6	6

Second round
(Russia) N Petrova (Italy) F Schiavone	7	4	6^{5}
(Germany) A-L Grönefeld (Switzerland) P Schnyder	6^{3}	6	7
(Slovakia) D Cibulková (France) V Razzano	7	4	7
12	(Czech Republic) I Benešová (Russia) G Voskoboeva	5	6	6^{5}
13	(Russia) E Vesnina (Russia) V Zvonareva	5	1
(United States) L Davenport (Slovakia) D Hantuchová	7	6
(Germany) S Lisicki (France) A Rezaï	6^{4}	4
4	(Slovenia) K Srebotnik (Japan) A Sugiyama	7	6

Third round
(Germany) A-L Grönefeld (Switzerland) P Schnyder	2	4
(Slovakia) D Cibulková (France) V Razzano	6	6
(United States) L Davenport (Slovakia) D Hantuchová	2	3
4	(Slovenia) K Srebotnik (Japan) A Sugiyama	6	6

Quarterfinals
(Slovakia) D Cibulková (France) V Razzano	1	6	3
4	(Slovenia) K Srebotnik (Japan) A Sugiyama	6	4	6

==== Section 4 ====
First round
7	(Ukraine) A Bondarenko (Ukraine) K Bondarenko	7	6
(Uzbekistan) A Amanmuradova (Belarus) D Kustova	5	1
(South Africa) N Grandin (Canada) A Wozniak	1	2
(Russia) A Kleybanova (Russia) E Makarova	6	6
(Russia) V Dushevina (Belarus) E Dzehalevich	6	6
(Greece) E Daniilidou (Germany) J Wöhr	1	2
(France) É Loit (France) P Parmentier	4	1
10	(United States) L Raymond (Australia) S Stosur	6	6
14	(Spain) N Llagostera Vives (Spain) MJ Martínez Sánchez	6	6
WC	(United States) G Brodsky (United States) M Cecil	1	0
(Belarus) T Poutchek (Australia) A Rodionova	6	7
(Czech Republic) B Záhlavová-Strýcová (Czech Republic) K Zakopalová	3	6^{3}
(Italy) ME Camerin (Argentina) G Dulko	6	6
WC	(United States) J Hampton (United States) C Vandeweghe	3	2
(New Zealand) M Erakovic (Croatia) J Kostanić Tošić	6	3	7
2	(Czech Republic) K Peschke (Australia) R Stubbs	4	6	5

Second round
7	(Ukraine) A Bondarenko (Ukraine) K Bondarenko	3	6	6
(Russia) A Kleybanova (Russia) E Makarova	6	2	2
(Russia) V Dushevina (Belarus) E Dzehalevich	4	4
10	(United States) L Raymond (Australia) S Stosur	6	6
14	(Spain) N Llagostera Vives (Spain) MJ Martínez Sánchez	6	3	2
(Belarus) T Poutchek (Australia) A Rodionova	3	6	6
(Italy) ME Camerin (Argentina) G Dulko	4	3
(New Zealand) M Erakovic (Croatia) J Kostanić Tošić	6	6

Third round
7	(Ukraine) A Bondarenko (Ukraine) K Bondarenko	6	3
10	(United States) L Raymond (Australia) S Stosur	7	6
(Belarus) T Poutchek (Australia) A Rodionova	3	3
(New Zealand) M Erakovic (Croatia) J Kostanić Tošić	6	6

Quarterfinals
10	(United States) L Raymond (Australia) S Stosur	7	6
(New Zealand) M Erakovic (Croatia) J Kostanić Tošić	6^{3}	0
