= 2005 Tashkent Open – Singles =

Singles
- 2005 Tashkent Open

Final
- Champion: (Netherlands) Michaëlla Krajicek
- Runner-up: (Uzbekistan) Akgul Amanmuradova
- Score: 6–0, 4–6, 6–3

Details
- Draw: 32
- Seeds: 8

Events
Singles	Doubles
← 2004 ·	Tashkent Open	· 2006 →

Nicole Vaidišová was the defending champion, but chose not to participate that year.

16-year-old Michaëlla Krajicek won the title, upsetting home-crowd-favourite Akgul Amanmuradova 6–0, 4–6, 6–3 in the final.

== Seeds ==
1. (Russia) Ekaterina Bychkova (semifinals)
2. (Ukraine) Alona Bondarenko (first round)
3. (Italy) Antonella Serra Zanetti (quarterfinals)
4. (Finland) Emma Laine (second round)
5. (Netherlands) Michaëlla Krajicek (champion)
6. (France) Émilie Loit (first round)
7. (Italy) Maria Elena Camerin (semifinals)
8. (Italy) Mara Santangelo (first round)

== Draw ==
=== Key ===
- Q = Qualifier
- WC = Wild card
- LL = Lucky loser
- Alt = Alternate
- SE = Special exempt
- PR = Protected ranking
- ITF = ITF entry
- JE = Junior exempt
- w/o = Walkover
- r = Retired
- d = Defaulted
- SR = Special ranking

=== Finals ===
Semifinals
1	(Russia) Ekaterina Bychkova	1	3
5	(Netherlands) Michaëlla Krajicek	6	6
7	(Italy) Maria Elena Camerin	3	4
WC	(Uzbekistan) Akgul Amanmuradova	6	6

Final
5	(Netherlands) Michaëlla Krajicek	6	4	6
WC	(Uzbekistan) Akgul Amanmuradova	0	6	3

=== Top half ===
First round
1	(Russia) E Bychkova	6	6
(India) S Uberoi	3	4
(Spain) A Parra Santonja	6	6
Q	(Belarus) T Poutchek	3	4
(Russia) T Panova	2	4
WC	(Russia) E Rodina	6	6
(Hungary) M Czink	7	6
6	(France) É Loit	5	0
4	(Finland) E Laine	6	6
(Belarus) A Yakimova	2	1
Q	(Ukraine) O Antypina	2	0
(Ukraine) K Bondarenko	6	6
(Czech Republic) B Strýcová	4	6	6
Q	(Indonesia) W Prakusya	6	3	2
(Czech Republic) H Šromová	3	6	1
5	(Netherlands) M Krajicek	6	1	6

Second round
1	(Russia) E Bychkova	6	6
(Spain) A Parra Santonja	3	1
WC	(Russia) E Rodina	7^{7}	6
(Hungary) M Czink	6^{2}	0
4	(Finland) E Laine	4	2
(Ukraine) K Bondarenko	6	6
(Czech Republic) B Strýcová	3	6	2
5	(Netherlands) M Krajicek	6	3	6

Quarterfinals
1	(Russia) E Bychkova	4	6	6
WC	(Russia) E Rodina	6	1	3
(Ukraine) K Bondarenko	2	6^{10}
5	(Netherlands) M Krajicek	6	7^{12}

Semifinals
1	(Russia) E Bychkova	1	3
5	(Netherlands) M Krajicek	6	6

=== Bottom half ===
First round
7	(Italy) ME Camerin	6	0	6
(Romania) E Gallovits	2	6	1
(Switzerland) E Gagliardi	7^{7}	4	6
(Ukraine) Y Fedak	6^{5}	6	2
Q	(Uzbekistan) I Tulyaganova	6	6
(Ukraine) O Savchuk	2	2
(Ukraine) M Koryttseva	2	4
3	(Italy) A Serra Zanetti	6	6
8	(Italy) M Santangelo	6^{1}	6	5
(Israel) T Obziler	7^{7}	3	7
LL	(Russia) A Rodionova	3	3
(Russia) E Vesnina	6	6
(Russia) G Voskoboeva	6	7
(Argentina) ME Salerni	3	5
WC	(Uzbekistan) A Amanmuradova	7^{7}	6
2	(Ukraine) A Bondarenko	6^{1}	4

Second round
7	(Italy) ME Camerin	6	6
(Switzerland) E Gagliardi	2	1
Q	(Uzbekistan) I Tulyaganova	4	6	1
3	(Italy) A Serra Zanetti	6	2	6
(Israel) T Obziler	6	4	0
(Russia) E Vesnina	3	6	6
(Russia) G Voskoboeva	4	4
WC	(Uzbekistan) A Amanmuradova	6	6

Quarterfinals
7	(Italy) ME Camerin	6	6
3	(Italy) A Serra Zanetti	3	2
(Russia) E Vesnina	6^{4}	6	6^{4}
WC	(Uzbekistan) A Amanmuradova	7^{7}	3	7^{7}

Semifinals
7	(Italy) ME Camerin	3	4
WC	(Uzbekistan) A Amanmuradova	6	6
