= 2004 Tashkent Open =

- Date: 11–17 October
- Edition: 6th
- Category: Tier IV
- Draw: 32S / 16D
- Prize money: $140,000
- Surface: Hard / outdoor
- Location: Tashkent, Uzbekistan
- Venue: Tashkent Tennis Center

Champions

Singles
- (Czech Republic) Nicole Vaidišová

Doubles
- (Italy) Adriana Serra Zanetti (Italy) Antonella Serra Zanetti
| ← 2003 · | Tashkent Open | · 2005 → |

The 2004 Tashkent Open was a women's tennis tournament played on hard courts at the Tashkent Tennis Center in Tashkent, Uzbekistan that was part of the Tier IV category of the 2004 WTA Tour. It was the sixth edition of the tournament and was held from 11 October through 17 October 2004. Unseeded Nicole Vaidišová won the singles title and earned $22,000 first-prize money.

== Finals ==
=== Singles ===
(Czech Republic) Nicole Vaidišová defeated (France) Virginie Razzano, 5–7, 6–3, 6–2

- It was Vaidišová's 2nd singles title of the year and of her career.

=== Doubles ===
(Italy) Adriana Serra Zanetti / (Italy) Antonella Serra Zanetti defeated (France) Marion Bartoli / (Italy) Mara Santangelo, 1–6, 6–3, 6–4
