= 2006 Tashkent Open – Doubles =

Doubles
- 2006 Tashkent Open

Final
- Champions: (Belarus) Victoria Azarenka (Belarus) Tatiana Poutchek
- Runners-up: (Italy) Maria Elena Camerin (Switzerland) Emmanuelle Gagliardi
- Score: Walkover

Events
Singles	Doubles
← 2005 ·	Tashkent Open	· 2007 →

Maria Elena Camerin and Émilie Loit were the defending champions, but Loit did not compete this year.

Camerin teamed up with Emmanuelle Gagliardi and reached the final against Victoria Azarenka and Tatiana Poutchek. However, Camerin suffered a sprain in her right ankle and was unable to play.

== Seeds ==
1. (Russia) Anastasia Rodionova / (Russia) Galina Voskoboeva (quarterfinals, withdrew due to a left wrist sprain on Voskoboeva)
2. (Italy) Maria Elena Camerin / (Switzerland) Emmanuelle Gagliardi (final, withdrew due to a right ankle sprain on Camerin)
3. (Chinese Taipei) Chan Chin-wei / (Thailand) Tamarine Tanasugarn (semifinals, withdrew due to a left ankle sprain on Tanasugarn)
4. (Belarus) Victoria Azarenka / (Belarus) Tatiana Poutchek (champions)

== Draw ==
=== Key ===
- Q = Qualifier
- WC = Wild card
- LL = Lucky loser
- Alt = Alternate
- SE = Special exempt
- PR = Protected ranking
- ITF = ITF entry
- JE = Junior exempt
- w/o = Walkover
- r = Retired
- d = Defaulted
- SR = Special ranking

=== Draw ===
First round
1	(Russia) A Rodionova (Russia) G Voskoboeva	6	6
(Russia) A Gabueva (Uzbekistan) D Narzykulova	2	1
(Canada) S Dubois (Russia) A Kudryavtseva	2	6	7^{7}
(China) J Ren (China) S Sun	6	3	6^{2}
4	(Belarus) V Azarenka (Belarus) T Poutchek	4	6	6
(Uzbekistan) A Amanmuradova (Uzbekistan) I Tulyaganova	6	4	1
(Italy) A Brianti (Czech Republic) H Šromová	6	5	3
(Croatia) S Ančić (Ukraine) M Koryttseva	1	7	6
(Uzbekistan) V Ekshibarova (Uzbekistan) E Sitdjemileva	2	3
(Belarus) E Dzehalevich (Hungary) K Nagy	6	6
(Belarus) O Govortsova (Russia) G Semenova	2	3
3	(Chinese Taipei) C-w Chan (Thailand) T Tanasugarn	6	6
Q	(Uzbekistan) S Khayrova (Uzbekistan) N Sirojiddinova	2	0
WC	(Uzbekistan) A Khabibulina (Uzbekistan) D Saidkhodjayeva	6	6
(Russia) L Skavronskaia (Belarus) A Yakimova	6^{4}	3
2	(Italy) ME Camerin (Switzerland) E Gagliardi	7^{7}	6

Quarterfinals
1	(Russia) A Rodionova (Russia) G Voskoboeva
(Canada) S Dubois (Russia) A Kudryavtseva	w/o
4	(Belarus) V Azarenka (Belarus) T Poutchek	6
(Croatia) S Ančić (Ukraine) M Koryttseva	3	r
(Belarus) E Dzehalevich (Hungary) K Nagy	3	6	2
3	(Chinese Taipei) C-w Chan (Thailand) T Tanasugarn	6	4	6
WC	(Uzbekistan) A Khabibulina (Uzbekistan) D Saidkhodjayeva	1	1
2	(Italy) ME Camerin (Switzerland) E Gagliardi	6	6

Semifinals
(Canada) S Dubois (Russia) A Kudryavtseva	6^{6}	1
4	(Belarus) V Azarenka (Belarus) T Poutchek	7^{8}	6
3	(Chinese Taipei) C-w Chan (Thailand) T Tanasugarn
2	(Italy) ME Camerin (Switzerland) E Gagliardi	w/o

Final
4	(Belarus) V Azarenka (Belarus) T Poutchek	w/o
2	(Italy) ME Camerin (Switzerland) E Gagliardi
