= 2005 Tashkent Open =

- Date: 3–9 October
- Edition: 7th
- Category: Tier IV Series
- Draw: 32S / 16D
- Prize money: $140,000
- Surface: Hard / outdoor
- Location: Tashkent, Uzbekistan
- Venue: Tashkent Tennis Center

Champions

Singles
- (Netherlands) Michaëlla Krajicek

Doubles
- (Italy) Maria Elena Camerin / (France) Émilie Loit
← 2004 ·	Tashkent Open	· 2006 →

The 2005 Tashkent Open was a women's tennis tournament played on outdoor hard courts. It was the seventh edition of the tournament, and part of the Tier IV Series of the 2005 WTA Tour. It took place at the Tashkent Tennis Center in Tashkent, Uzbekistan, from 3 October through 9 October 2005. Fifth-seeded Michaëlla Krajicek won the singles title and earned $22,000 first-prize money.

== Finals ==
=== Singles ===
(Netherlands) Michaëlla Krajicek defeated (Uzbekistan) Akgul Amanmuradova 6–0, 4–6, 6–3

- It was Krajicek's 1st singles career title on the WTA Tour.

=== Doubles ===
(Italy) Maria Elena Camerin / (France) Émilie Loit defeated (Russia) Anastasia Rodionova / (Russia) Galina Voskoboeva 6–3, 6–0
