= 2004 Tashkent Open – Singles =

Singles
- 2004 Tashkent Open

Final
- Champion: (Czech Republic) Nicole Vaidišová
- Runner-up: (France) Virginie Razzano
- Score: 5–7, 6–3, 6–2

Details
- Draw: 32
- Seeds: 8

Events
| Singles | Doubles |
| ← 2003 · | Tashkent Open | · 2005 → |

Virginia Ruano Pascual was the defending champion, but decided to compete in Moscow at the same week.

Nicole Vaidišová won the title by defeating Virginie Razzano 5–7, 6–3, 6–2 in the final.

== Seeds ==
1. (France) Marion Bartoli (first round)
2. (United States) Meghann Shaughnessy (semifinals)
3. (Spain) Marta Marrero (quarterfinals)
4. (Spain) Arantxa Parra Santonja (quarterfinals)
5. (Germany) Anca Barna (semifinals)
6. (Germany) Anna-Lena Grönefeld (second round)
7. (Slovakia) ~~Ľubomíra Kurhajcová~~ (withdrew due to a virus)
8. (Thailand) Tamarine Tanasugarn (first round)
9. (France) Virginie Razzano (final)

== Draw ==
=== Key ===
- Q = Qualifier
- WC = Wild card
- LL = Lucky loser
- Alt = Alternate
- SE = Special exempt
- PR = Protected ranking
- ITF = ITF entry
- JE = Junior exempt
- w/o = Walkover
- r = Retired
- d = Defaulted
- SR = Special ranking

=== Finals ===
Semifinals
5 | (Germany) Anca Barna | 2 | 2
9 | (France) Virginie Razzano | 6 | 6
(Czech Republic) Nicole Vaidišová | 6 | 5 | 7^{7}
2 | (United States) Meghann Shaughnessy | 1 | 7 | 6^{1}

Final
9 | (France) Virginie Razzano | 7 | 3 | 2
(Czech Republic) Nicole Vaidišová | 5 | 6 | 6

=== Top half ===
First round
1 | (France) M Bartoli | 4 | 4
WC | (Uzbekistan) I Tulyaganova | 6 | 6
(Italy) An Serra Zanetti | 6 | 3
(Germany) J Schruff | 3 | 0^{r}
(Croatia) S Talaja | 1 | 4
LL | (Russia) E Bychkova | 6 | 6
(Thailand) S Viratprasert | 2 | 4
5 | (Germany) A Barna | 6 | 6
3 | (Spain) M Marrero | 4 | 6 | 6
(Belarus) T Poutchek | 6 | 2 | 4
Q | (Croatia) I Abramović | 6 | 1 | 4
Q | (Belarus) N Ostrovskaya | 1 | 6 | 6
Q | (Russia) M Goloviznina | 7 | 7^{7}
WC | (Uzbekistan) A Amanmuradova | 5 | 6^{4}
Q | (Ukraine) K Bondarenko | 6^{6} | 1
9 | (France) V Razzano | 7^{8} | 6

Second round
WC | (Uzbekistan) I Tulyaganova | 4 | 2
(Italy) An Serra Zanetti | 6 | 6
LL | (Russia) E Bychkova | 5 | 1
5 | (Germany) A Barna | 7 | 6
3 | (Spain) M Marrero | 6 | 6
Q | (Belarus) N Ostrovskaya | 3 | 1
Q | (Russia) M Goloviznina
9 | (France) V Razzano | w/o

Quarterfinals
(Italy) An Serra Zanetti | 5 | 3
5 | (Germany) A Barna | 7 | 6
3 | (Spain) M Marrero | 5 | 4
9 | (France) V Razzano | 7 | 6

Semifinals
5 | (Germany) A Barna | 2 | 2
9 | (France) V Razzano | 6 | 6

=== Bottom half ===
First round
6 | (Germany) AL Grönefeld | 6 | 6
LL | (Germany) A Matic | 4 | 4
(Czech Republic) N Vaidišová | 6 | 6
(Zimbabwe) C Black | 4 | 3
(Italy) Ad Serra Zanetti | 6 | 6^{5} | 0
(Belarus) A Yakimova | 4 | 7^{7} | 6
(Italy) M Santangelo | 3 | 6 | 4
4 | (Spain) A Parra Santonja | 6 | 1 | 6
8 | (Thailand) T Tanasugarn | 4 | 6 | 0
(Russia) E Linetskaya | 6 | 4 | 6
LL | (Ukraine) O Savchuk | 7^{7} | 2 | 6
(Luxembourg) A Kremer | 6^{4} | 6 | 1
(Germany) M Müller | 0 | 1
(Ukraine) Y Beygelzimer | 6 | 6
LL | (Japan) R Fuda | 2 | 2
2 | (United States) M Shaughnessy | 6 | 6

Second round
6 | (Germany) AL Grönefeld | 2 | 3
(Czech Republic) N Vaidišová | 6 | 6
(Belarus) A Yakimova | 6 | 3 | 5
4 | (Spain) A Parra Santonja | 2 | 6 | 7
(Russia) E Linetskaya | 6 | 0 | 4
LL | (Ukraine) O Savchuk | 3 | 6 | 6
(Ukraine) Y Beygelzimer | 1 | 1
2 | (United States) M Shaughnessy | 6 | 6

Quarterfinals
(Czech Republic) N Vaidišová | 5 | 6 | 6
4 | (Spain) A Parra Santonja | 7 | 4 | 0
LL | (Ukraine) O Savchuk | 2 | 3
2 | (United States) M Shaughnessy | 6 | 6

Semifinals
(Czech Republic) N Vaidišová | 6 | 5 | 7^{7}
2 | (United States) M Shaughnessy | 1 | 7 | 6^{1}
