= 2004 Tashkent Open – Doubles =

Doubles
- 2004 Tashkent Open

Final
- Champions: (Italy) Adriana Serra Zanetti (Italy) Antonella Serra Zanetti
- Runners-up: (France) Marion Bartoli (Italy) Mara Santangelo
- Score: 1–6, 6–3, 6–4

Events
Singles	Doubles
← 2003 ·	Tashkent Open	· 2005 →

Yuliya Beygelzimer and Tatiana Poutchek were the defending champions, but competed this year with different partners. Poutchek teamed up with Darya Kustova and lost in the first round to Adriana Serra Zanetti and Antonella Serra Zanetti, while Beygelzimer teamed up with Silvija Talaja and lost in semifinals to Marion Bartoli and Mara Santangelo.

Adriana Serra Zanetti and Antonella Serra Zanetti won the title by defeating Marion Bartoli and Mara Santangelo 1–6, 6–3, 6–4 in the final.

== Seeds ==
1. (Germany) Anna-Lena Grönefeld / (United States) Meghann Shaughnessy (semifinals, retired due to a left wrist sprain on Grönefeld)
2. (France) Marion Bartoli / (Italy) Mara Santangelo (final)
3. (Ukraine) Yuliya Beygelzimer / (Croatia) Silvija Talaja (semifinals)
4. (Italy) Adriana Serra Zanetti / (Italy) Antonella Serra Zanetti (champions)

== Draw ==
=== Key ===
- Q = Qualifier
- WC = Wild card
- LL = Lucky loser
- Alt = Alternate
- SE = Special exempt
- PR = Protected ranking
- ITF = ITF entry
- JE = Junior exempt
- w/o = Walkover
- r = Retired
- d = Defaulted
- SR = Special ranking

=== Draw ===
First round
1	(Germany) AL Grönefeld (United States) M Shaughnessy	6	6
Q	(Russia) E Linetskaya (Czech Republic) N Vaidišová	1	1
(Ukraine) K Bondarenko (Ukraine) V Bondarenko	6	6
(Uzbekistan) A Amanmuradova (Uzbekistan) I Israilova	3	2
4	(Italy) Ad Serra Zanetti (Italy) An Serra Zanetti	6	6
(Belarus) D Kustova (Belarus) T Poutchek	4	1
(Ukraine) O Antypina (Belarus) E Dzehalevich	6	7
(Luxembourg) A Kremer (Germany) A Matic	3	5
(Russia) E Bychkova (Russia) M Goloviznina	6	6
WC	(Uzbekistan) V Ekshibarova (Uzbekistan) D Saidkhodjayeva	0	2
(Belarus) N Ostrovskaya (Ukraine) O Savchuk	6^{5}	7	1
3	(Ukraine) Y Beygelzimer (Croatia) S Talaja	7^{7}	5	6
(Germany) M Müller (Germany) J Schruff	5	2
(Germany) A Barna (Spain) A Parra Santonja	7	6
(Japan) R Fuda (Thailand) S Viratprasert	5	1
2	(France) M Bartoli (Italy) M Santangelo	7	6

Quarterfinals
1	(Germany) AL Grönefeld (United States) M Shaughnessy	6	6
(Ukraine) K Bondarenko (Ukraine) V Bondarenko	1	3
4	(Italy) Ad Serra Zanetti (Italy) An Serra Zanetti	6	6
(Ukraine) O Antypina (Belarus) E Dzehalevich	2	3
(Russia) E Bychkova (Russia) M Goloviznina
3	(Ukraine) Y Beygelzimer (Croatia) S Talaja	w/o
(Germany) A Barna (Spain) A Parra Santonja	6	2	3
2	(France) M Bartoli (Italy) M Santangelo	4	6	6

Semifinals
1	(Germany) AL Grönefeld (United States) M Shaughnessy	3	1^{r}
4	(Italy) Ad Serra Zanetti (Italy) An Serra Zanetti	6	2
3	(Ukraine) Y Beygelzimer (Croatia) S Talaja	3	6	1
2	(France) M Bartoli (Italy) M Santangelo	6	2	6

Final
4	(Italy) Ad Serra Zanetti (Italy) An Serra Zanetti	1	6	6
2	(France) M Bartoli (Italy) M Santangelo	6	3	4
