= 2005 Tashkent Open – Doubles =

Doubles
- 2005 Tashkent Open

Final
- Champions: (Italy) Maria Elena Camerin (France) Émilie Loit
- Runners-up: (Russia) Anastasia Rodionova (Russia) Galina Voskoboeva
- Score: 6–3, 6–0

Events
Singles	Doubles
← 2004 ·	Tashkent Open	· 2006 →

Adriana Serra Zanetti and Antonella Serra Zanetti were the defending champions, but chose not to participate that year.

Maria Elena Camerin and Émilie Loit won in the final 6–3, 6–0 against Anastasia Rodionova and Galina Voskoboeva.

== Seeds ==
1. (Italy) Maria Elena Camerin / (France) Émilie Loit (champions)
2. (Switzerland) Emmanuelle Gagliardi / (Argentina) María Emilia Salerni (first round)
3. (France) Caroline Dhenin / (Italy) Mara Santangelo (first round)
4. (Poland) Klaudia Jans / (Poland) Alicja Rosolska (first round)

== Draw ==
=== Key ===
- Q = Qualifier
- WC = Wild card
- LL = Lucky loser
- Alt = Alternate
- SE = Special exempt
- PR = Protected ranking
- ITF = ITF entry
- JE = Junior exempt
- w/o = Walkover
- r = Retired
- d = Defaulted
- SR = Special ranking

First round
1	(Italy) ME Camerin (France) É Loit	6	6
(Romania) E Gallovits (Czech Republic) B Strýcová	3	2
(Ukraine) M Koryttseva (Russia) E Vesnina	1	4
WC	(Uzbekistan) A Amanmuradova (Uzbekistan) I Tulyaganova	6	6
4	(Poland) K Jans (Poland) A Rosolska	2	4
(Ukraine) O Antypina (Czech Republic) H Šromová	6	6
Q	(Indonesia) W Prakusya (Russia) J Vorobieva	5	7^{9}	2
(Belarus) T Poutchek (Belarus) A Yakimova	7	6^{7}	6
LL	(Ukraine) V Bondarenko (Uzbekistan) I Israilova
(Russia) E Bychkova (Finland) E Laine	w/o
(Netherlands) M Krajicek (Hungary) Á Szávay	6	7^{8}
3	(France) C Dhenin (Italy) M Santangelo	1	6^{6}
(Ukraine) A Bondarenko (Ukraine) K Bondarenko	6	6
(Hungary) M Czink (Ukraine) Y Fedak	1	4
(Russia) A Rodionova (Russia) G Voskoboeva	6
2	(Switzerland) E Gagliardi (Argentina) ME Salerni	2	r

Quarterfinals
1	(Italy) ME Camerin (France) É Loit	6	6
WC	(Uzbekistan) A Amanmuradova (Uzbekistan) I Tulyaganova	2	4
(Ukraine) O Antypina (Czech Republic) H Šromová	5	6	2
(Belarus) T Poutchek (Belarus) A Yakimova	7	3	6
(Russia) E Bychkova (Finland) E Laine	1	1
(Netherlands) M Krajicek (Hungary) Á Szávay	6	6
(Ukraine) A Bondarenko (Ukraine) K Bondarenko	6	3	2
(Russia) A Rodionova (Russia) G Voskoboeva	4	6	6

Semifinals
1	(Italy) ME Camerin (France) É Loit	6	4	6
(Belarus) T Poutchek (Belarus) A Yakimova	3	6	2
(Netherlands) M Krajicek (Hungary) Á Szávay	2	2
(Russia) A Rodionova (Russia) G Voskoboeva	6	6

Final
1	(Italy) ME Camerin (France) É Loit	6	6
(Russia) A Rodionova (Russia) G Voskoboeva	3	0
