= 2008 Wimbledon Championships – Women's singles =

Women's singles
- 2008 Wimbledon Championships

Final
- Champion: (United States) Venus Williams
- Runner-up: (United States) Serena Williams
- Score: 7–5, 6–4

Details
- Draw: 128 (12Q / 8WC)
- Seeds: 32

Events
Singles	men	women		boys	girls
Doubles	men	women	mixed	boys	girls
WC Singles	men	women	quad
WC Doubles	men	women	quad
Legends	men	women	seniors
← 2007 ·	Wimbledon Championships	· 2009 →

Defending champion Venus Williams defeated her sister Serena Williams in the final, 7–5, 6–4 to win the ladies' singles tennis title at the 2008 Wimbledon Championships. It was her fifth Wimbledon title and seventh and last major singles title overall. Venus did not lose a set during the tournament, the second time she did so at a major.

Ana Ivanovic, Jelena Janković, Maria Sharapova and Svetlana Kuznetsova were in contention for the world No. 1 singles ranking. Ivanovic retained the top ranking despite losing in the third round to Zheng Jie. Janković, Sharapova and Kuznetsova also lost in the first four rounds, marking the first time in history that none of the top four seeds advanced to the quarterfinals.

Zheng went on to reach the semifinals, the first Chinese player to do so at a singles major, and the first wild card to reach the Wimbledon women's singles semifinals. Zheng's win over Ivanovic made her, as the world No. 133, the lowest-ranked player to defeat a reigning world No. 1; this record would be broken only two months later by Julie Coin at the 2008 US Open, who also defeated Ivanovic. Tamarine Tanasugarn was the first Thai player to reach a major singles quarterfinal.

This tournament marked the first Wimbledon appearance of Petra Kvitová, who would go on to win twice at this major.

== Seeds ==
1. (Serbia) Ana Ivanovic (third round)
2. (Serbia) Jelena Janković (fourth round)
3. (Russia) Maria Sharapova (second round)
4. (Russia) Svetlana Kuznetsova (fourth round)
5. (Russia) Elena Dementieva (semifinals)
6. (United States) Serena Williams (final)
7. (United States) Venus Williams (champion)
8. (Russia) Anna Chakvetadze (fourth round)
9. (Russia) Dinara Safina (third round)
10. (Slovakia) Daniela Hantuchová (second round)
11. (France) Marion Bartoli (third round)
12. (Switzerland) Patty Schnyder (first round)
13. (Russia) Vera Zvonareva (second round)
14. (Poland) Agnieszka Radwańska (quarterfinals)
15. (Hungary) Ágnes Szávay (fourth round)
16. (Belarus) Victoria Azarenka (third round)

17. (France) Alizé Cornet (first round)
18. (Czech Republic) Nicole Vaidišová (quarterfinals)
19. (Russia) Maria Kirilenko (first round)
20. (Italy) Francesca Schiavone (second round)
21. (Russia) Nadia Petrova (quarterfinals)
22. (Italy) Flavia Pennetta (second round)
23. (Slovenia) Katarina Srebotnik (first round)
24. (Israel) Shahar Pe'er (fourth round)
25. (United States) Lindsay Davenport (second round, withdrew due to a knee injury)
26. (Austria) Sybille Bammer (second round)
27. (France) Virginie Razzano (first round)
28. (Ukraine) Alona Bondarenko (second round, retired due to a right leg injury)
29. (France) Amélie Mauresmo (third round)
30. (Slovakia) Dominika Cibulková (first round)
31. (Denmark) Caroline Wozniacki (third round)
32. (India) Sania Mirza (second round)

Click on the seed number of a player to go to their draw section.

== Draw ==
Key

- Q = Qualifier
- WC = Wild card
- LL = Lucky loser
- Alt = Alternate
- ITF = ITF entry
- PR = Protected ranking
- SR = Special ranking
- SE = Special exempt
- JE = Junior exempt
- JR = Junior Accelerator Programme entrant
- CO = College Accelerator Programme entrant
- NG = Next Gen Accelerator Program entrant
- w/o = Walkover
- r = Retired
- d = Defaulted

=== Finals ===
Quarterfinals
WC	(China) Zheng Jie	6	5	6
18	(Czech Republic) Nicole Vaidišová	2	7	1
14	(Poland) Agnieszka Radwańska	4	0
6	(United States) Serena Williams	6	6
5	(Russia) Elena Dementieva	6	6^{6}	6
21	(Russia) Nadia Petrova	1	7^{8}	3
7	(United States) Venus Williams	6	6
(Thailand) Tamarine Tanasugarn	4	3

Semifinals
WC	(China) Zheng Jie	2	6^{5}
6	(United States) Serena Williams	6	7^{7}
5	(Russia) Elena Dementieva	1	6^{3}
7	(United States) Venus Williams	6	7^{7}

Final
6	(United States) Serena Williams	5	4
7	(United States) Venus Williams	7	6

=== Top half ===
==== Section 1 ====
First round
1	(Serbia) A Ivanovic	6	6
(Paraguay) R de los Ríos	1	2
(France) N Dechy	6^{7}	6	6
(China) M Yuan	7^{9}	3	0
WC	(United Kingdom) E Baltacha	6	2	7
(Germany) A Kerber	3	6	5
WC	(China) J Zheng	6	6
30	(Slovakia) D Cibulková	4	3
20	(Italy) F Schiavone	6	5	10
(Austria) T Paszek	3	7	8
(China) Z Yan	3	0
(Spain) A Medina Garrigues	6	6
(Romania) M Niculescu	1	6	6
Q	(Slovakia) M Rybáriková	6	3	4
(Italy) T Garbin	1	3
15	(Hungary) Á Szávay	6	6

Second round
1	(Serbia) A Ivanovic	6^{2}	7^{7}	10
(France) N Dechy	7^{7}	6^{3}	8
WC	(United Kingdom) E Baltacha	2	5
WC	(China) J Zheng	6	7
20	(Italy) F Schiavone	6	5	7
(Spain) A Medina Garrigues	3	7	9
(Romania) M Niculescu	7	5	2
15	(Hungary) Á Szávay	5	7	6

Third round
1	(Serbia) A Ivanovic	1	4
WC	(China) J Zheng	6	6
(Spain) A Medina Garrigues	6^{5}	6	2
15	(Hungary) Á Szávay	7^{7}	2	6

Fourth round
WC	(China) J Zheng	6	6
15	(Hungary) Á Szávay	3	4

==== Section 2 ====
First round
12	(Switzerland) P Schnyder	4	6	1
(Australia) C Dellacqua	6	3	6
(Uzbekistan) A Amanmuradova	5	4
(France) P Parmentier	7	6
WC	(Australia) S Stosur	6	6
(Romania) R Olaru	2	2
Q	(Czech Republic) Z Ondrášková	2	2
18	(Czech Republic) N Vaidišová	6	6
27	(France) V Razzano	6	2	4
(Russia) E Rodina	0	6	6
(Spain) N Llagostera Vives	7^{8}	4	4
(Russia) E Vesnina	6^{6}	6	6
(Austria) Y Meusburger	1	2
(Romania) E Gallovits	6	6
(Canada) S Dubois	6	1	6
8	(Russia) A Chakvetadze	2	6	8

Second round
(Australia) C Dellacqua	1	6	6
(France) P Parmentier	6	2	3
WC	(Australia) S Stosur	2	6	4
18	(Czech Republic) N Vaidišová	6	0	6
(Russia) E Rodina	6	7^{7}
(Russia) E Vesnina	1	6^{0}
(Romania) E Gallovits	4	2
8	(Russia) A Chakvetadze	6	6

Third round
(Australia) C Dellacqua	2	4
18	(Czech Republic) N Vaidišová	6	6
(Russia) E Rodina	4	3
8	(Russia) A Chakvetadze	6	6

Fourth round
18	(Czech Republic) N Vaidišová	4	7^{7}	6
8	(Russia) A Chakvetadze	6	6^{0}	3

==== Section 3 ====
First round
4	(Russia) S Kuznetsova	6^{5}	7	6
Q	(France) M Johansson	7^{7}	5	3
(Ukraine) K Bondarenko	1	6	6
Q	(Japan) R Fujiwara	6	4	3
(France) C Pin	5	6	5
Q	(Czech Republic) B Záhlavová-Strýcová	7	4	7
WC	(United Kingdom) M South	3	7^{7}	4
28	(Ukraine) A Bondarenko	6	6^{1}	6
17	(France) A Cornet	6^{6}	6^{4}
Q	(Russia) A Pavlyuchenkova	7^{8}	7^{7}
(Australia) A Rodionova	6	0	1
(China) N Li	3	6	6
(Poland) M Domachowska	6	3	6
(United States) J Craybas	1	6	4
(Czech Republic) I Benešová	3	0
14	(Poland) A Radwańska	6	6

Second round
4	(Russia) S Kuznetsova	6	6
(Ukraine) K Bondarenko	2	3
Q	(Czech Republic) B Záhlavová-Strýcová	6	3
28	(Ukraine) A Bondarenko	3	0^{r}
Q	(Russia) A Pavlyuchenkova	6	6
(China) N Li	2	4
(Poland) M Domachowska	1	3
14	(Poland) A Radwańska	6	6

Third round
4	(Russia) S Kuznetsova	6	6
Q	(Czech Republic) B Záhlavová-Strýcová	2	4
Q	(Russia) A Pavlyuchenkova	3	2
14	(Poland) A Radwańska	6	6

Fourth round
4	(Russia) S Kuznetsova	4	6	5
14	(Poland) A Radwańska	6	1	7

==== Section 4 ====
First round
11	(France) M Bartoli	6	6
(Germany) S Lisicki	2	4
(Ukraine) T Perebiynis	6	0	6
(Czech Republic) P Kvitová	4	6	4
(United States) B Mattek	5	6	6
Q	(France) S Brémond	7	0	1
(Russia) V Dushevina	6	6
19	(Russia) M Kirilenko	3	3
29	(France) A Mauresmo	6	6
(United States) A Harkleroad	4	3
(Venezuela) M Sequera	1	4
(Spain) V Ruano Pascual	6	6
(Czech Republic) K Zakopalová	1	4
WC	(Poland) U Radwańska	6	6
(Estonia) K Kanepi	5	3
6	(United States) S Williams	7	6

Second round
11	(France) M Bartoli	6	7
(Ukraine) T Perebiynis	2	5
(United States) B Mattek	7^{8}	6
(Russia) V Dushevina	6^{6}	4
29	(France) A Mauresmo	4	6	6
(Spain) V Ruano Pascual	6	1	1
WC	(Poland) U Radwańska	4	4
6	(United States) S Williams	6	6

Third round
11	(France) M Bartoli	4	1
(United States) B Mattek	6	6
29	(France) A Mauresmo	6^{5}	1
6	(United States) S Williams	7^{7}	6

Fourth round
(United States) B Mattek	3	3
6	(United States) S Williams	6	6

=== Bottom half ===
==== Section 5 ====
First round
5	(Russia) E Dementieva	6	6^{7}	6
Q	(Italy) ME Camerin	3	7^{9}	3
(United States) J Ditty	5	3
(Switzerland) T Bacsinszky	7	6
(Argentina) G Dulko	1	6	6
(France) A Rezaï	6	0	2
(Czech Republic) R Voráčová	3	7	3
25	(United States) L Davenport	6	5	6
24	(Israel) S Pe'er	6	7
WC	(United Kingdom) K O'Brien	3	5
(Czech Republic) L Šafářová	3	6^{4}
(France) É Loit	6	7^{7}
(France) S Cohen-Aloro	3	2
(Chinese Taipei) S-w Hsieh	6	6
(Chinese Taipei) Y-j Chan	6^{8}	2
9	(Russia) D Safina	7^{10}	6

Second round
5	(Russia) E Dementieva	4	6	6
(Switzerland) T Bacsinszky	6	3	3
(Argentina) G Dulko
25	(United States) L Davenport	w/o
24	(Israel) S Pe'er	6	6
(France) É Loit	3	4
(Chinese Taipei) S-w Hsieh	3	2
9	(Russia) D Safina	6	6

Third round
5	(Russia) E Dementieva	7^{7}	7
(Argentina) G Dulko	6^{2}	5
24	(Israel) S Pe'er	7	6^{4}	8
9	(Russia) D Safina	5	7^{7}	6

Fourth round
5	(Russia) E Dementieva	6	6
24	(Israel) S Pe'er	2	1

==== Section 6 ====
First round
16	(Belarus) V Azarenka	6	6
(Bulgaria) T Pironkova	1	1
(Russia) E Bychkova	4	4
(Romania) S Cîrstea	6	6
(Italy) M Santangelo	7	6
(Estonia) M Ani	5	3
(Belarus) O Govortsova	4	4
21	(Russia) N Petrova	6	6
26	(Austria) S Bammer	4	4
(Sweden) S Arvidsson	6	1^{r}
(China) S Peng	6	6
Q	(Ukraine) V Kutuzova	3	4
(Russia) E Makarova	0	4
(Russia) A Kudryavtseva	6	6
Q	(France) S Foretz	1	4
3	(Russia) M Sharapova	6	6

Second round
16	(Belarus) V Azarenka	6	6
(Romania) S Cîrstea	1	3
(Italy) M Santangelo	4	5
21	(Russia) N Petrova	6	7
26	(Austria) S Bammer	6^{7}	6	3
(China) S Peng	7^{9}	4	6
(Russia) A Kudryavtseva	6	6
3	(Russia) M Sharapova	2	4

Third round
16	(Belarus) V Azarenka	6^{11}	6^{4}
21	(Russia) N Petrova	7^{13}	7^{7}
(China) S Peng	3	6	4
(Russia) A Kudryavtseva	6	1	6

Fourth round
21	(Russia) N Petrova	6	6
(Russia) A Kudryavtseva	1	4

==== Section 7 ====
First round
7	(United States) V Williams	7^{7}	6
WC	(United Kingdom) N Cavaday	6^{5}	1
(United Kingdom) A Keothavong	4	6	6
(United States) V King	6	2	3
(Germany) M Müller	1	1
Q	(Spain) MJ Martínez Sánchez	6	6
(Colombia) C Castaño	6^{3}	6	4
32	(India) S Mirza	7^{7}	3	6
22	(Italy) F Pennetta	6	6
(Ukraine) J Vakulenko	3	4
(Japan) A Sugiyama	6	6
(Belgium) Y Wickmayer	4	2
(Russia) A Kleybanova	6	6
(Israel) T Obziler	4	0
(Italy) S Errani	6^{5}	4
10	(Slovakia) D Hantuchová	7^{7}	6

Second round
7	(United States) V Williams	7	6
(United Kingdom) A Keothavong	5	2
Q	(Spain) MJ Martínez Sánchez	6	4	9
32	(India) S Mirza	0	6	7
22	(Italy) F Pennetta	6^{5}	6	2
(Japan) A Sugiyama	7^{7}	2	6
(Russia) A Kleybanova	6	4	6
10	(Slovakia) D Hantuchová	3	6	1

Third round
7	(United States) V Williams	6	7
Q	(Spain) MJ Martínez Sánchez	1	5
(Japan) A Sugiyama	4	4
(Russia) A Kleybanova	6	6

Fourth round
7	(United States) V Williams	6	6
(Russia) A Kleybanova	3	4

==== Section 8 ====
First round
13	(Russia) V Zvonareva	6	6^{3}	6
(Japan) A Nakamura	1	7^{7}	1
(Thailand) T Tanasugarn	6	6
(Czech Republic) P Cetkovská	4	3
(Netherlands) M Krajicek	6^{3}	6^{6}
(New Zealand) M Erakovic	7^{7}	7^{8}
(Germany) J Görges	4	7^{8}	16
23	(Slovenia) K Srebotnik	6	6^{6}	14
31	(Denmark) C Wozniacki	6	7
Q	(Czech Republic) E Hrdinová	2	5
(Canada) A Wozniak	7	6
(Ukraine) M Koryttseva	5	4
(Russia) G Voskoboeva	2	4
WC	(Spain) C Suárez Navarro	6	6
(Ukraine) O Savchuk	3	2
2	(Serbia) J Janković	6	6

Second round
13	(Russia) V Zvonareva	6^{10}	6	3
(Thailand) T Tanasugarn	7^{12}	4	6
(New Zealand) M Erakovic	6	7^{7}
(Germany) J Görges	2	6^{5}
31	(Denmark) C Wozniacki	6	6
(Canada) A Wozniak	1	1
WC	(Spain) C Suárez Navarro	1	3
2	(Serbia) J Janković	6	6

Third round
(Thailand) T Tanasugarn	4	6	6
(New Zealand) M Erakovic	6	4	4
31	(Denmark) C Wozniacki	6	4	2
2	(Serbia) J Janković	2	6	6

Fourth round
(Thailand) T Tanasugarn	6	6
2	(Serbia) J Janković	3	2

== Championship match statistics ==
Category	(United States) V. Williams	(United States) S. Williams
1st serve %	57/91 (63%)	44/66 (67%)
1st serve points won	35 of 57 = 61%	33 of 44 = 75%
2nd serve points won	19 of 34 = 56%	5 of 22 = 23%
Total service points won	54 of 91 = 59.34%	38 of 66 = 57.58%
Aces	4	9
Double faults	3	1
Winners	20	23
Unforced errors	18	25
Net points won	17 of 19 = 89%	12 of 15 = 80%
Break points converted	4 of 7 = 57%	2 of 13 = 15%
Return points won	28 of 66 = 42%	37 of 91 = 41%
Total points won	82	75

Preceded by 2008 French Open – Women's singles	Grand Slam women's singles	Succeeded by 2008 US Open – Women's singles
