= 2015 Miami Open – Women's singles =

Undefeated journey of Serena Williams and the last game of Nicole Vaidišová

Women's singles
- 2015 Miami Open

Final
- Champion: (United States) Serena Williams
- Runner-up: (Spain) Carla Suárez Navarro
- Score: 6–2, 6–0

Details
- Draw: 96
- Seeds: 32

Events
Singles	men	women
Doubles	men	women
- Miami Masters

Two-time defending champion Serena Williams, defeated Carla Suárez Navarro in the final, 6–2, 6–0 to win the women's singles tennis title at the 2015 Miami Open. It was her record-extending eighth Miami Open title.

This tournament marked the final professional appearance of former world No. 7 Nicole Vaidišová.

== Seeds ==
All seeds receive a bye into the second round.

1. (United States) Serena Williams (champion)
2. (Russia) Maria Sharapova (second round)
3. (Romania) Simona Halep (semifinals)
4. (Denmark) Caroline Wozniacki (fourth round)
5. (Serbia) Ana Ivanovic (third round)
6. (Canada) Eugenie Bouchard (second round)
7. (Poland) Agnieszka Radwańska (fourth round)
8. (Russia) Ekaterina Makarova (fourth round)
9. (Germany) Andrea Petkovic (semifinals)
10. (Czech Republic) Lucie Šafářová (second round)
11. (Italy) Sara Errani (fourth round)
12. (Spain) Carla Suárez Navarro (final)
13. (Germany) Angelique Kerber (third round)
14. (Czech Republic) Karolína Plíšková (quarterfinals)
15. (Italy) Flavia Pennetta (fourth round)
16. (United States) Venus Williams (quarterfinals)

17. (United States) Madison Keys (second round)
18. (China) Peng Shuai (withdrew because of a back injury)
19. (Czech Republic) Barbora Záhlavová-Strýcová (second round)
20. (Serbia) Jelena Janković (second round)
21. (Spain) Garbiñe Muguruza (third round)
22. (France) Alizé Cornet (third round)
23. (Australia) Samantha Stosur (third round)
24. (Russia) Svetlana Kuznetsova (fourth round)
25. (France) Caroline Garcia (second round)
26. (Ukraine) Elina Svitolina (third round)
27. (Germany) Sabine Lisicki (quarterfinals)
28. (United States) Varvara Lepchenko (second round)
29. (Kazakhstan) Zarina Diyas (second round)
30. (Italy) Camila Giorgi (third round)
31. (Romania) Irina-Camelia Begu (third round)
32. (Australia) Casey Dellacqua (second round)

Click on the seed number of a player to go to their draw section.

== Draw ==
Key

- Q = Qualifier
- WC = Wild card
- LL = Lucky loser
- Alt = Alternate
- ITF = ITF entry
- PR = Protected ranking
- SR = Special ranking
- SE = Special exempt
- JE = Junior exempt
- JR = Junior Accelerator Programme entrant
- CO = College Accelerator Programme entrant
- NG = Next Gen Accelerator Program entrant
- w/o = Walkover
- r = Retired
- d = Defaulted

=== Finals ===
Quarterfinals
1	(United States) Serena Williams	7^{7}	1	6
27	(Germany) Sabine Lisicki	6^{4}	6	3
3	(Romania) Simona Halep	6	7
(United States) Sloane Stephens	1	5
12	(Spain) Carla Suárez Navarro	0	6	7
16	(United States) Venus Williams	6	1	5
9	(Germany) Andrea Petkovic	6	6
14	(Czech Republic) Karolína Plíšková	4	2

Semifinals
1	(United States) Serena Williams	6	4	7
3	(Romania) Simona Halep	2	6	5
12	(Spain) Carla Suárez Navarro	6	6
9	(Germany) Andrea Petkovic	3	3

Final
1	(United States) Serena Williams	6	6
12	(Spain) Carla Suárez Navarro	2	0

=== Top half ===
==== Section 1 ====
First round
(United States) S Rogers	6^{1}	1
(Romania) M Niculescu	7^{7}	6
WC	(Netherlands) I de Vroome	2	2
WC	(United States) C Bellis	6	6
(United States) A Riske	6	6
(Croatia) M Lučić-Baroni	4	0
(United Kingdom) H Watson	3	6	7
Q	(Russia) E Rodina	6	1	5

Second round
1	(United States) S Williams	6	6
(Romania) M Niculescu	3	1
WC	(United States) C Bellis	6	6
29	(Kazakhstan) Z Diyas	2	1
24	(Russia) S Kuznetsova	6	6
(United States) A Riske	2	2
(United Kingdom) H Watson	5	6	4
13	(Germany) A Kerber	7	3	6

Third round
1	(United States) S Williams	6	6
WC	(United States) C Bellis	1	1
24	(Russia) S Kuznetsova	6	3	6
13	(Germany) A Kerber	3	6	3

Fourth round
1	(United States) S Williams	6	6
24	(Russia) S Kuznetsova	2	3

==== Section 2 ====
First round
(Russia) A Pavlyuchenkova	6	3	7
PR	(Russia) V Zvonareva	2	6	5
(United States) L Davis	3	6^{5}
Q	(Bulgaria) S Karatantcheva	6	7^{7}
(Germany) J Görges	6	6
(Slovakia) J Čepelová	1	0
(Puerto Rico) M Puig	6^{9}	6^{3}
Q	(United States) I Falconi	7^{11}	7^{7}

Second round
11	(Italy) S Errani	6	7^{7}
(Russia) A Pavlyuchenkova	1	6^{5}
Q	(Bulgaria) S Karatantcheva	1	3
21	(Spain) G Muguruza	6	6
27	(Germany) S Lisicki	7^{7}	6^{5}	6
(Germany) J Görges	6^{1}	7^{7}	4
Q	(United States) I Falconi	5	7^{7}	3
5	(Serbia) A Ivanovic	7	6^{4}	6

Third round
11	(Italy) S Errani	4	6	6
21	(Spain) G Muguruza	6	4	1
27	(Germany) S Lisicki	7^{7}	7
5	(Serbia) A Ivanovic	6^{4}	5

Fourth round
11	(Italy) S Errani	1	2
27	(Germany) S Lisicki	6	6

==== Section 3 ====
First round
Q	(Hungary) T Babos	1	6^{4}
WC	(Czech Republic) N Vaidišová	6	7^{7}
Q	(Belgium) A Van Uytvanck	7	2	6
(Slovakia) M Rybáriková	5	6	0
(Belarus) V Azarenka	6	6
(Spain) S Soler Espinosa	1	3
Q	(Ukraine) K Kozlova	4	3
(Bulgaria) T Pironkova	6	6

Second round
3	(Romania) S Halep	6	2	6
WC	(Czech Republic) N Vaidišová	4	6	1
Q	(Belgium) A Van Uytvanck	3	2
30	(Italy) C Giorgi	6	6
20	(Serbia) J Janković	1	1
(Belarus) V Azarenka	6	6
(Bulgaria) T Pironkova	7^{7}	3	3
15	(Italy) F Pennetta	6^{1}	6	6

Third round
3	(Romania) S Halep	6	7
30	(Italy) C Giorgi	4	5
(Belarus) V Azarenka	6^{5}	6^{6}
15	(Italy) F Pennetta	7^{7}	7^{8}

Fourth round
3	(Romania) S Halep	6	7
15	(Italy) F Pennetta	3	5

==== Section 4 ====
First round
(Kazakhstan) Y Shvedova	4	6^{4}
(Sweden) J Larsson	6	7^{7}
(Belgium) Y Wickmayer	1	3
(United States) S Stephens	6	6
(Slovakia) D Hantuchová	1	6^{5}
(Switzerland) B Bencic	6	7^{7}
(Italy) R Vinci	6^{9}	3
Q	(Germany) T Maria	7^{11}	6

Second round
10	(Czech Republic) L Šafářová	6^{5}	2
(Sweden) J Larsson	7^{7}	6
(United States) S Stephens	6	6
17	(United States) M Keys	4	2
32	(Australia) C Dellacqua	2	6	2
(Switzerland) B Bencic	6	4	6
Q	(Germany) T Maria	6	7^{7}
6	(Canada) E Bouchard	0	6^{4}

Third round
(Sweden) J Larsson	4	4
(United States) S Stephens	6	6
(Switzerland) B Bencic	6	7
Q	(Germany) T Maria	4	5

Fourth round
(United States) S Stephens	6	7^{7}
(Switzerland) B Bencic	4	6^{5}

=== Bottom half ===
==== Section 5 ====
First round
(Slovakia) A Schmiedlová	6	6
(Slovenia) P Hercog	3	2
WC	(Russia) N Vikhlyantseva	6	5	2
(Czech Republic) T Smitková	0	7	6
Q	(Romania) A Dulgheru	4	2
(Russia) E Vesnina	6	6
Q	(Switzerland) S Vögele	6	6
(Belgium) K Flipkens	2	2

Second round
7	(Poland) A Radwańska	6	7
(Slovakia) A Schmiedlová	4	5
(Czech Republic) T Smitková	7	4	4
31	(Romania) I-C Begu	5	6	6
22	(France) A Cornet	6	6
(Russia) E Vesnina	4	1
Q	(Switzerland) S Vögele	3	1
12	(Spain) C Suárez Navarro	6	6

Third round
7	(Poland) A Radwańska	6	4	6
31	(Romania) I-C Begu	2	6	2
22	(France) A Cornet	0	4
12	(Spain) C Suárez Navarro	6	6

Fourth round
7	(Poland) A Radwańska	7	0	4
12	(Spain) C Suárez Navarro	5	6	6

==== Section 6 ====
First round
Q	(Poland) U Radwańska	6	6^{2}	6
(United States) C Vandeweghe	4	7^{7}	3
Q	(France) P Parmentier	4	6	6
(Netherlands) K Bertens	6	2	3
WC	(Canada) F Abanda	2	3
(Estonia) K Kanepi	6	6
(United States) M Brengle	6	6
(Serbia) A Krunić	0	2

Second round
16	(United States) V Williams	6	6
Q	(Poland) U Radwańska	3	2
Q	(France) P Parmentier	1	6	0
23	(Australia) S Stosur	6	3	6
28	(United States) V Lepchenko	2	4
(Estonia) K Kanepi	6	6
(United States) M Brengle	0	1
4	(Denmark) C Wozniacki	6	6

Third round
16	(United States) V Williams	6	7^{7}
23	(Australia) S Stosur	4	6^{3}
(Estonia) K Kanepi	6	1	3
4	(Denmark) C Wozniacki	4	6	6

Fourth round
16	(United States) V Williams	6	7^{7}
4	(Denmark) C Wozniacki	3	6^{1}

==== Section 7 ====
First round
(Italy) K Knapp	6	6
(Czech Republic) K Siniaková	2	0
(Serbia) B Jovanovski	3	6	6
(Germany) M Barthel	6	3	2
(Czech Republic) K Koukalová	4	4
(France) K Mladenovic	6	6
WC	(Romania) S Cîrstea	5	4
(United States) C McHale	7	6

Second round
8	(Russia) E Makarova	6	6
(Italy) K Knapp	1	3
(Serbia) B Jovanovski	3	6^{3}
26	(Ukraine) E Svitolina	6	7^{7}
19	(Czech Republic) B Záhlavová-Strýcová	5	2
(France) K Mladenovic	7	6
(United States) C McHale	2	2
9	(Germany) A Petkovic	6	6

Third round
8	(Russia) E Makarova	6	6
26	(Ukraine) E Svitolina	0	4
(France) K Mladenovic	0	2
9	(Germany) A Petkovic	6	6

Fourth round
8	(Russia) E Makarova	1	5
9	(Germany) A Petkovic	6	7

==== Section 8 ====
First round
(Germany) A Beck	6	4	6
(China) S Zhang	4	6	4
(Czech Republic) P Cetkovská	1	1
WC	(Spain) P Badosa	6	6
(Japan) K Nara	6	6
(Croatia) A Tomljanović	4	3
Q	(New Zealand) M Erakovic	1^{r}
WC	(Russia) D Gavrilova	5

Second round
14	(Czech Republic) Ka Plíšková	2	6	6
(Germany) A Beck	6	3	4
WC	(Spain) P Badosa	6	7
LL	(China) S Zheng	1	5
25	(France) C Garcia	3	6^{9}
(Japan) K Nara	6	7^{11}
WC	(Russia) D Gavrilova	7^{7}	6
2	(Russia) M Sharapova	6^{4}	3

Third round
14	(Czech Republic) Ka Plíšková	7	6
WC	(Spain) P Badosa	5	1
(Japan) K Nara	0	6^{5}
WC	(Russia) D Gavrilova	6	7^{7}

Fourth round
14	(Czech Republic) Ka Plíšková	6	6
WC	(Russia) D Gavrilova	3	2

== Qualifying ==
=== Seeds ===
1. (Italy) Francesca Schiavone (first round)
2. (Romania) Alexandra Dulgheru (qualified)
3. (China) Zheng Saisai (qualifying competition, lucky loser)
4. (Germany) Carina Witthöft (first round)
5. (New Zealand) Marina Erakovic (qualified)
6. (Spain) María Teresa Torró Flor (first round, retired)
7. (Croatia) Donna Vekić (first round)
8. (Hungary) Tímea Babos (qualified)
9. (United States) Nicole Gibbs (first round)
10. (Czech Republic) Denisa Allertová (qualifying competition)
11. (South Africa) Chanelle Scheepers (qualifying competition)
12. (France) Pauline Parmentier (qualified)
13. (Russia) Evgeniya Rodina (qualified)
14. (United States) Grace Min (qualifying competition)
15. (Croatia) Ana Konjuh (qualifying competition)
16. (Germany) Anna-Lena Friedsam (first round)
17. (Switzerland) Stefanie Vögele (qualified)
18. (United States) Irina Falconi (qualified)
19. (Romania) Andreea Mitu (first round)
20. (Ukraine) Kateryna Kozlova (qualified)
21. (Kazakhstan) Yulia Putintseva (first round)
22. (Germany) Tatjana Maria (qualified)
23. (Belgium) An-Sophie Mestach (first round)
24. (Turkey) Çağla Büyükakçay (first round)

=== Qualifiers ===
1. (Switzerland) Stefanie Vögele
2. (Romania) Alexandra Dulgheru
3. (Ukraine) Kateryna Kozlova
4. (Poland) Urszula Radwańska
5. (New Zealand) Marina Erakovic
6. (Germany) Tatjana Maria
7. (Belgium) Alison Van Uytvanck
8. (Hungary) Tímea Babos
9. (Bulgaria) Sesil Karatantcheva
10. (United States) Irina Falconi
11. (Russia) Evgeniya Rodina
12. (France) Pauline Parmentier

=== Lucky loser ===
1. (China) Zheng Saisai

=== Qualifying draw ===
==== First qualifier ====
First round
1	(Italy) Francesca Schiavone	4	0
(China) Zhu Lin	6	6
(Israel) Shahar Pe'er	5	4
17	(Switzerland) Stefanie Vögele	7	6

Qualifying competition
(China) Zhu Lin	1	1
17	(Switzerland) Stefanie Vögele	6	6

==== Second qualifier ====
First round
2	(Romania) Alexandra Dulgheru	6	4	6
(France) Océane Dodin	4	6	1
WC	(Turkey) İpek Soylu	6	6
19	(Romania) Andreea Mitu	0	1

Qualifying competition
2	(Romania) Alexandra Dulgheru	6	7
WC	(Turkey) İpek Soylu	4	5

==== Third qualifier ====
First round
3	(China) Zheng Saisai	6	6
(Portugal) Michelle Larcher de Brito	2	1
(Serbia) Jovana Jakšić	3	1
20	(Ukraine) Kateryna Kozlova	6	6

Qualifying competition
3	(China) Zheng Saisai	1	3
20	(Ukraine) Kateryna Kozlova	6	6

==== Fourth qualifier ====
First round
4	(Germany) Carina Witthöft	2	5
(Poland) Urszula Radwańska	6	7
WC	(United States) Sachia Vickery	6	3	2
15	(Croatia) Ana Konjuh	3	6	6

Qualifying competition
(Poland) Urszula Radwańska	6	6
15	(Croatia) Ana Konjuh	2	2

==== Fifth qualifier ====
First round
5	(New Zealand) Marina Erakovic	6	6
(Russia) Alexandra Panova	3	2
(Spain) Lourdes Domínguez Lino	6	6
21	(Kazakhstan) Yulia Putintseva	1	0

Qualifying competition
5	(New Zealand) Marina Erakovic	6	7^{7}
(Spain) Lourdes Domínguez Lino	2	6^{1}

==== Sixth qualifier ====
First round
6	(Spain) María Teresa Torró Flor	1	0^{r}
(Montenegro) Danka Kovinić	6	0
WC	(Kazakhstan) Maria Shishkina	1	1
22	(Germany) Tatjana Maria	6	6

Qualifying competition
(Montenegro) Danka Kovinić	2	4
22	(Germany) Tatjana Maria	6	6

==== Seventh qualifier ====
First round
7	(Croatia) Donna Vekić	1	2
WC	(United States) Ingrid Neel	6	6
(Belgium) Alison Van Uytvanck	6	6
16	(Germany) Anna-Lena Friedsam	3	4

Qualifying competition
WC	(United States) Ingrid Neel	6^{7}	4
(Belgium) Alison Van Uytvanck	7^{9}	6

==== Eighth qualifier ====
First round
8	(Hungary) Tímea Babos	7	6
(Tunisia) Ons Jabeur	5	3
(Czech Republic) Lucie Hradecká	6	6
24	(Turkey) Çağla Büyükakçay	2	3

Qualifying competition
8	(Hungary) Tímea Babos	6	6
(Czech Republic) Lucie Hradecká	2	3

==== Ninth qualifier ====
First round
9	(United States) Nicole Gibbs	4	3
(Israel) Julia Glushko	6	6
(Bulgaria) Sesil Karatantcheva	6	5	6
23	(Belgium) An-Sophie Mestach	2	7	3

Qualifying competition
(Israel) Julia Glushko	2	6	3
(Bulgaria) Sesil Karatantcheva	6	4	6

==== Tenth qualifier ====
First round
10	(Czech Republic) Denisa Allertová	6	6
WC	(Netherlands) Arantxa Rus	3	1
WC	(Hungary) Fanny Stollár	0	6^{0}
18	(United States) Irina Falconi	6	7^{7}

Qualifying competition
10	(Czech Republic) Denisa Allertová	6^{6}	6	5
18	(United States) Irina Falconi	7^{8}	1	7

==== Eleventh qualifier ====
First round
11	(South Africa) Chanelle Scheepers	6	6
(Japan) Kimiko Date-Krumm	4	0
(Colombia) Mariana Duque Mariño	6	5	2
13	(Russia) Evgeniya Rodina	4	7	6

Qualifying competition
11	(South Africa) Chanelle Scheepers	6	4	2
13	(Russia) Evgeniya Rodina	0	6	6

==== Twelfth qualifier ====
First round
12	(France) Pauline Parmentier	7	2	6
(Russia) Alla Kudryavtseva	5	6	4
PR	(Romania) Edina Gallovits-Hall	2	7^{7}	4
14	(United States) Grace Min	6	6^{3}	6

Qualifying competition
12	(France) Pauline Parmentier	6	6
14	(United States) Grace Min	2	4
