= 2009 Sony Ericsson Open – Women's singles =

Women's singles
- 2009 Sony Ericsson Open

Final
- Champion: (Belarus) Victoria Azarenka
- Runner-up: (United States) Serena Williams
- Score: 6–3, 6–1

Details
- Draw: 96 (8WC/12Q)
- Seeds: 32

Events
Singles	men	women
Doubles	men	women
- Miami Open

Victoria Azarenka defeated the two-time defending champion Serena Williams in the final, 6–3, 6–1 to win the women's singles tennis title at the 2009 Miami Open. It was her third WTA Tour singles title, and first at the Premier or above level.

== Seeds ==
All seeds received a bye into the second round.

1. (United States) Serena Williams (final)
2. (Russia) Dinara Safina (third round)
3. (Serbia) Jelena Janković (second round)
4. (Russia) Elena Dementieva (fourth round)
5. (United States) Venus Williams (semifinals)
6. (Russia) Vera Zvonareva (third round)
7. (Serbia) Ana Ivanovic (third round)
8. (Russia) Svetlana Kuznetsova (semifinals)
9. (Russia) Nadia Petrova (third round)
10. (Poland) Agnieszka Radwańska (fourth round)
11. (Belarus) Victoria Azarenka (champion)
12. (France) Marion Bartoli (second round)
13. (Denmark) Caroline Wozniacki (quarterfinals)
14. (France) Alizé Cornet (third round)
15. (Italy) Flavia Pennetta (third round)
16. (Slovakia) Dominika Cibulková (third round, retired to due cramping)
17. (China) Zheng Jie (fourth round)
18. (Switzerland) Patty Schnyder (third round)
19. (Spain) Anabel Medina Garrigues (fourth round)
20. (France) Amélie Mauresmo (fourth round)
21. (Estonia) Kaia Kanepi (third round)
22. (Russia) Anna Chakvetadze (third round)
23. (Japan) Ai Sugiyama (second round)
24. (Russia) Alisa Kleybanova (fourth round)
25. (Hungary) Ágnes Szávay (fourth round)
26. (Czech Republic) Iveta Benešová (quarterfinals)
27. (Austria) Sybille Bammer (second round)
28. (Ukraine) Alona Bondarenko (second round)
29. (Canada) Aleksandra Wozniak (second round)
30. (Italy) Sara Errani (second round)
31. (Spain) Carla Suárez Navarro (third round)
32. (China) Peng Shuai (third round)

== Draw ==
Key

- Q = Qualifier
- WC = Wild card
- LL = Lucky loser
- Alt = Alternate
- ITF = ITF entry
- PR = Protected ranking
- SR = Special ranking
- SE = Special exempt
- JE = Junior exempt
- JR = Junior Accelerator Programme entrant
- CO = College Accelerator Programme entrant
- NG = Next Gen Accelerator Program entrant
- w/o = Walkover
- r = Retired
- d = Defaulted

=== Finals ===
Quarterfinals
1	(United States) Serena Williams	4	7^{7}	6
(China) Li Na	6	6^{1}	2
26	(Czech Republic) Iveta Benešová	1	4
5	(United States) Venus Williams	6	6
8	(Russia) Svetlana Kuznetsova	6	6^{5}	6
13	(Denmark) Caroline Wozniacki	4	7^{7}	1
11	(Belarus) Victoria Azarenka	6	6
(Australia) Samantha Stosur	1	0

Semifinals
1	(United States) Serena Williams	6	3	6
5	(United States) Venus Williams	4	6	3
8	(Russia) Svetlana Kuznetsova	3	6	5
11	(Belarus) Victoria Azarenka	6	2	7

Final
1	(United States) Serena Williams	3	1
11	(Belarus) Victoria Azarenka	6	6

=== Top half ===
==== Section 1 ====
First round
(Switzerland) T Bacsinszky	4	1
WC	(United States) A Glatch	6	6
(France) P Parmentier	1	5
PR	(Italy) M Santangelo	6	7
(France) V Razzano	4	6	6^{4}
Q	(Germany) J Görges	6	4	7^{7}
(Italy) K Knapp	6^{2}	3
(Czech Republic) B Záhlavová-Strýcová	7^{7}	6

Second round
1	(United States) S Williams	6	6
WC	(United States) A Glatch	2	3
PR	(Italy) M Santangelo	5	3
32	(China) S Peng	7	6
17	(China) J Zheng	6	6
Q	(Germany) J Görges	4	2
(Czech Republic) B Záhlavová-Strýcová	4	6^{4}
14	(France) A Cornet	6	7^{7}

Third round
1	(United States) S Williams	7	6
32	(China) S Peng	5	2
17	(China) J Zheng	6	6
14	(France) A Cornet	4	0

Fourth round
1	(United States) S Williams	7	5	6
17	(China) J Zheng	5	7	3

==== Section 2 ====
First round
Q	(Japan) A Morita	6	4	6^{3}
Q	(Netherlands) M Krajicek	1	6	7^{7}
(Russia) E Makarova	3	6	6
(Chinese Taipei) Y-j Chan	6	2	3
Q	(Poland) U Radwańska	4	7	1
(China) N Li	6	5	6
(Italy) T Garbin	6	6
(Czech Republic) K Zakopalová	3	4

Second round
9	(Russia) N Petrova	3	6	6
Q	(Netherlands) M Krajicek	6	4	2
(Russia) E Makarova	6	6
23	(Japan) A Sugiyama	3	4
29	(Canada) A Wozniak	5	3
(China) N Li	7	6
(Italy) T Garbin	4	1
6	(Russia) V Zvonareva	6	6

Third round
9	(Russia) N Petrova	5	1
(Russia) E Makarova	7	6
(China) N Li	6	3	6
6	(Russia) V Zvonareva	4	6	2

Fourth round
(Russia) E Makarova	7^{7}	2	2
(China) N Li	6^{3}	6	6

==== Section 3 ====
First round
(Argentina) G Dulko	6	6
(Spain) L Domínguez Lino	2	4
(Germany) S Lisicki	6	6
(Czech Republic) P Kvitová	2	4
(Russia) A Kudryavtseva	6	7^{8}
Q	(Colombia) M Duque Marino	4	6^{6}
(New Zealand) M Erakovic	0	2
Q	(Croatia) K Šprem	6	6

Second round
3	(Serbia) J Janković	4	6^{5}
(Argentina) G Dulko	6	7^{7}
(Germany) S Lisicki	2	4
26	(Czech Republic) I Benešová	6	6
19	(Spain) A Medina Garrigues	7^{7}	6
(Russia) A Kudryavtseva	6^{3}	4
Q	(Croatia) K Šprem	4	3
16	(Slovakia) D Cibulková	6	6

Third round
(Argentina) G Dulko	3	2
26	(Czech Republic) I Benešová	6	6
19	(Spain) A Medina Garrigues	7^{7}	1	5
16	(Slovakia) D Cibulková	6^{4}	6	5^{r}

Fourth round
26	(Czech Republic) I Benešová	6	6
19	(Spain) A Medina Garrigues	4	1

==== Section 4 ====
First round
(Thailand) T Tanasugarn	6	7
(France) N Dechy	3	5
(Spain) MJ Martínez Sánchez	6	6
(Belgium) Y Wickmayer	0	4
Q	(United States) J Craybas	4	1
(Germany) A-L Grönefeld	6	6
WC	(Belgium) T Hendler	1	6^{5}
(Israel) S Pe'er	6	7^{7}

Second round
10	(Poland) A Radwańska	4	6	6
(Thailand) T Tanasugarn	6	3	2
(Spain) MJ Martínez Sánchez	6	4	5
21	(Estonia) K Kanepi	4	6	7
30	(Italy) S Errani	4	3
(Germany) A-L Grönefeld	6	6
(Israel) S Pe'er	3	3
5	(United States) V Williams	6	6

Third round
10	(Poland) A Radwańska	6	6
21	(Estonia) K Kanepi	4	3
(Germany) A-L Grönefeld	5	3
5	(United States) V Williams	7	6

Fourth round
10	(Poland) A Radwańska	6	1	4
5	(United States) V Williams	4	6	6

=== Bottom half ===
==== Section 5 ====
First round
(Romania) M Niculescu	5	2
Q	(Austria) T Paszek	7	6
(Czech Republic) N Vaidišová	6	6
Q	(Austria) P Mayr	4	2
(Kazakhstan) G Voskoboeva	6	6
(Russia) V Dushevina	4	4
Q	(Belarus) A Yakimova	6	6
(Belarus) O Govortsova	2	1

Second round
8	(Russia) S Kuznetsova	2	7	6
Q	(Austria) T Paszek	6	5	1
(Czech Republic) N Vaidišová	6	6
28	(Ukraine) A Bondarenko	1	0
24	(Russia) A Kleybanova	6	6
(Kazakhstan) G Voskoboeva	2	4
Q	(Belarus) A Yakimova	6	6
12	(France) M Bartoli	4	3

Third round
8	(Russia) S Kuznetsova	6	6
(Czech Republic) N Vaidišová	1	4
24	(Russia) A Kleybanova	6	3	6
Q	(Belarus) A Yakimova	3	6	4

Fourth round
8	(Russia) S Kuznetsova	6	6
24	(Russia) A Kleybanova	2	1

==== Section 6 ====
First round
(Romania) E Gallovits	3	6^{5}
WC	(Australia) J Dokić	6	7^{7}
(Czech Republic) L Šafářová	6	7
(United Kingdom) A Keothavong	4	5
WC	(United States) C Vandeweghe	0	3
(Spain) N Llagostera Vives	6	6
WC	(Russia) A Pivovarova	7^{7}	6
(United States) B Mattek-Sands	6^{1}	3

Second round
13	(Denmark) C Wozniacki	6	5	6
WC	(Australia) J Dokić	3	7	2
(Czech Republic) L Šafářová	6	1	4
18	(Switzerland) P Schnyder	4	6	6
31	(Spain) C Suárez Navarro	3	6	7^{7}
(Spain) N Llagostera Vives	6	4	6^{3}
WC	(Russia) A Pivovarova	0	6	3
4	(Russia) E Dementieva	6	3	6

Third round
13	(Denmark) C Wozniacki	6	6
18	(Switzerland) P Schnyder	4	4
31	(Spain) C Suárez Navarro	2	2
4	(Russia) E Dementieva	6	6

Fourth round
13	(Denmark) C Wozniacki	7	6
4	(Russia) E Dementieva	5	4

==== Section 7 ====
First round
Q	(Ukraine) M Koryttseva	6	6
(Romania) S Cîrstea	2	1
(Italy) F Schiavone	6	5	6
(Bulgaria) T Pironkova	3	7	3
WC	(United States) M Oudin	6	3	2
(Slovakia) D Hantuchová	4	6	6
(Russia) A Pavlyuchenkova	4	7	6
Q	(France) A Rezaï	6	5	3

Second round
7	(Serbia) A Ivanovic	6	6
Q	(Ukraine) M Koryttseva	0	3
(Italy) F Schiavone	6	4	2
25	(Hungary) Á Szávay	2	6	6
22	(Russia) A Chakvetadze	6	6
(Slovakia) D Hantuchová	3	1
(Russia) A Pavlyuchenkova	2	2
11	(Belarus) V Azarenka	6	6

Third round
7	(Serbia) A Ivanovic	4	6	1
25	(Hungary) Á Szávay	6	4	6
22	(Russia) A Chakvetadze	1	4
11	(Belarus) V Azarenka	6	6

Fourth round
25	(Hungary) Á Szávay	2	4
11	(Belarus) V Azarenka	6	6

==== Section 8 ====
First round
(Ukraine) K Bondarenko	4	6	4
(Russia) M Kirilenko	6	0	6
WC	(Netherlands) A Rus	6	3	5
(Slovakia) M Rybáriková	3	6	7
(Sweden) S Arvidsson	1	0	r
(Australia) S Stosur	6	2
(France) M Johansson	1	7^{7}	7^{10}
WC	(India) S Mirza	6	6^{2}	6^{8}

Second round
15	(Italy) F Pennetta	6	7
(Russia) M Kirilenko	4	5
(Slovakia) M Rybáriková	3	6	2
20	(France) A Mauresmo	6	1	6
27	(Austria) S Bammer	1	1
(Australia) S Stosur	6	6
(France) M Johansson	1	3
2	(Russia) D Safina	6	6

Third round
15	(Italy) F Pennetta	7^{7}	2	2
20	(France) A Mauresmo	6^{5}	6	6
(Australia) S Stosur	6	6
2	(Russia) D Safina	1	4

Fourth round
20	(France) A Mauresmo	4	4
(Australia) S Stosur	6	6

== Qualifying ==
=== Qualifying seeds ===
1. (Russia) Elena Vesnina (first round)
2. (Italy) Roberta Vinci (first round)
3. (Austria) Tamira Paszek (qualified)
4. (France) Julie Coin (first round)
5. (France) Séverine Bremond (qualifying competition)
6. (Hungary) Melinda Czink (qualifying competition)
7. (Slovakia) Jarmila Groth (qualifying competition)
8. (Austria) Patricia Mayr (qualified)
9. (Germany) Kristina Barrois (first round)
10. (Japan) Ayumi Morita (qualified)
11. (France) Stéphanie Cohen-Aloro (first round)
12. (Czech Republic) Lucie Hradecká (first round)
13. (Paraguay) Rossana de los Ríos (first round)
14. (United States) Vania King (qualifying competition)
15. (Estonia) Maret Ani (first round)
16. (Uzbekistan) Akgul Amanmuradova (qualifying competition)
17. (Belarus) Anastasiya Yakimova (qualified)
18. (Ukraine) Mariya Koryttseva (qualified)
19. (France) Aravane Rezaï (qualified)
20. (France) Camille Pin (qualifying competition)
21. (Poland) Marta Domachowska (qualifying competition)
22. (United States) Jill Craybas (qualified)
23. (United Kingdom) Melanie South (qualifying competition)
24. (Romania) Raluca Olaru (qualifying competition)

=== Qualifiers ===
1. (Netherlands) Michaëlla Krajicek
2. (Ukraine) Mariya Koryttseva
3. (Austria) Tamira Paszek
4. (France) Aravane Rezaï
5. (United States) Jill Craybas
6. (Poland) Urszula Radwańska
7. (Belarus) Anastasiya Yakimova
8. (Austria) Patricia Mayr
9. (Croatia) Karolina Šprem
10. (Japan) Ayumi Morita
11. (Colombia) Mariana Duque Mariño
12. (Germany) Julia Görges

=== Qualifying draw ===
==== First qualifier ====
First round
1	(Russia) Elena Vesnina	6^{5}	4
WC	(Netherlands) Michaëlla Krajicek	7^{7}	6
(France) Émilie Loit	2	1
20	(France) Camille Pin	6	6

Qualifying competition
WC	(Netherlands) Michaëlla Krajicek	7^{7}	6
20	(France) Camille Pin	6^{3}	1

==== Second qualifier ====
First round
2	(Italy) Roberta Vinci	2	3
(Russia) Anastasia Rodionova	6	6
(Germany) Andrea Petkovic	4	6^{7}
18	(Ukraine) Mariya Koryttseva	6	7^{9}

Qualifying competition
(Russia) Anastasia Rodionova	2	2
18	(Ukraine) Mariya Koryttseva	6	6

==== Third qualifier ====
First round
3	(Austria) Tamira Paszek	6	4	6
(China) Yan Zi	2	6	4
(Canada) Stéphanie Dubois	6	3	2
23	(United Kingdom) Melanie South	1	6	6

Qualifying competition
3	(Austria) Tamira Paszek	6	6
23	(United Kingdom) Melanie South	1	0

==== Fourth qualifier ====
First round
4	(France) Julie Coin	4	7^{7}	6^{4}
(Switzerland) Stefanie Vögele	6	6^{5}	7^{7}
(Portugal) Michelle Larcher de Brito	1	2
19	(France) Aravane Rezaï	6	6

Qualifying competition
(Switzerland) Stefanie Vögele	6^{1}	3
19	(France) Aravane Rezaï	7^{7}	6

==== Fifth qualifier ====
First round
5	(France) Séverine Bremond	6	6
(Italy) Alberta Brianti	1	1
(Kazakhstan) Sesil Karatantcheva	5	6	4
22	(United States) Jill Craybas	7	2	6

Qualifying competition
5	(France) Séverine Bremond	6	5	3
22	(United States) Jill Craybas	3	7	6

==== Sixth qualifier ====
First round
6	(Hungary) Melinda Czink	6	3	7
WC	(Croatia) Petra Martić	4	6	5
(Poland) Urszula Radwańska	6	6
13	(Paraguay) Rossana de los Ríos	0	4

Qualifying competition
6	(Hungary) Melinda Czink	3	1
(Poland) Urszula Radwańska	6	6

==== Seventh qualifier ====
First round
7	(Slovakia) Jarmila Groth	7^{7}	6
(United States) Varvara Lepchenko	6^{3}	3
WC	(United States) Christina McHale	4	7	0
17	(Belarus) Anastasiya Yakimova	6	5	6

Qualifying competition
7	(Slovakia) Jarmila Groth	7^{9}	4	2
17	(Belarus) Anastasiya Yakimova	6^{7}	6	6

==== Eighth qualifier ====
First round
8	(Austria) Patricia Mayr	6	2
(United Kingdom) Elena Baltacha	0	0^{r}
(Ukraine) Olga Savchuk	0	1
21	(Poland) Marta Domachowska	6	6

Qualifying competition
8	(Austria) Patricia Mayr	6	1	6
21	(Poland) Marta Domachowska	2	6	3

==== Ninth qualifier ====
First round
9	(Germany) Kristina Barrois	5	4
(Croatia) Karolina Šprem	7	6
WC	(United States) Sloane Stephens	3	2
16	(Uzbekistan) Akgul Amanmuradova	6	6

Qualifying competition
(Croatia) Karolina Šprem	6	6
16	(Uzbekistan) Akgul Amanmuradova	1	1

==== Tenth qualifier ====
First round
10	(Japan) Ayumi Morita	6	6
(Spain) Virginia Ruano Pascual	4	2
WC	(United States) Gail Brodsky	2	3
14	(United States) Vania King	6	6

Qualifying competition
10	(Japan) Ayumi Morita	7	6
14	(United States) Vania King	5	4

==== Eleventh qualifier ====
First round
11	(France) Stéphanie Cohen-Aloro	0	2
(Colombia) Mariana Duque Mariño	6	6
(Germany) Tatjana Malek	6	6
15	(Estonia) Maret Ani	3	4

Qualifying competition
(Colombia) Mariana Duque Mariño	6	6
(Germany) Tatjana Malek	4	4

==== Twelfth qualifier ====
First round
12	(Czech Republic) Lucie Hradecká	3	3
(Germany) Julia Görges	6	6
WC	(United States) Julia Boserup	2	1
24	(Romania) Raluca Olaru	6	6

Qualifying competition
(Germany) Julia Görges	6^{5}	6	7^{7}
24	(Romania) Raluca Olaru	7^{7}	3	6^{3}
