= 2007 Tashkent Open =

- Date: 1–7 October
- Edition: 9th
- Category: Tier IV
- Draw: 32S / 16D
- Prize money: $145,000
- Surface: Hard
- Location: Tashkent, Uzbekistan

Champions

Singles
- (France) Pauline Parmentier

Doubles
- (Belarus) Ekaterina Dzehalevich / (Belarus) Anastasiya Yakimova
- Tashkent Open

The 2007 Tashkent Open was a women's tennis tournament that was part of the WTA Tier IV category of the 2007 WTA Tour. It was the ninth edition of the tournament and was held in Tashkent, Uzbekistan. Unseeded Pauline Parmentier won the singles title, defeating Victoria Azarenka in the final, while Anastasiya Yakimova and Ekaterina Dzehalevich won the doubles title over Tatiana Poutchek and Anastassia Rodionova.

== New players ==
In the first round, a wildcard named Vlada Ekshibarova entered her first Women's Tennis Association tournament, and raced through her first round match against the sixth seeded Alla Kudryavtseva in straight sets.

Ksenia Palkina from Kyrgyzstan qualified and defeated Ekaterina Dzehalevic in the first round. Palkina then defeated Ekshibarova in three sets to enter her first Women's Tennis Association quarterfinal. Palkina then lost to Victoria Azarenka.

== Finals ==
=== Singles ===
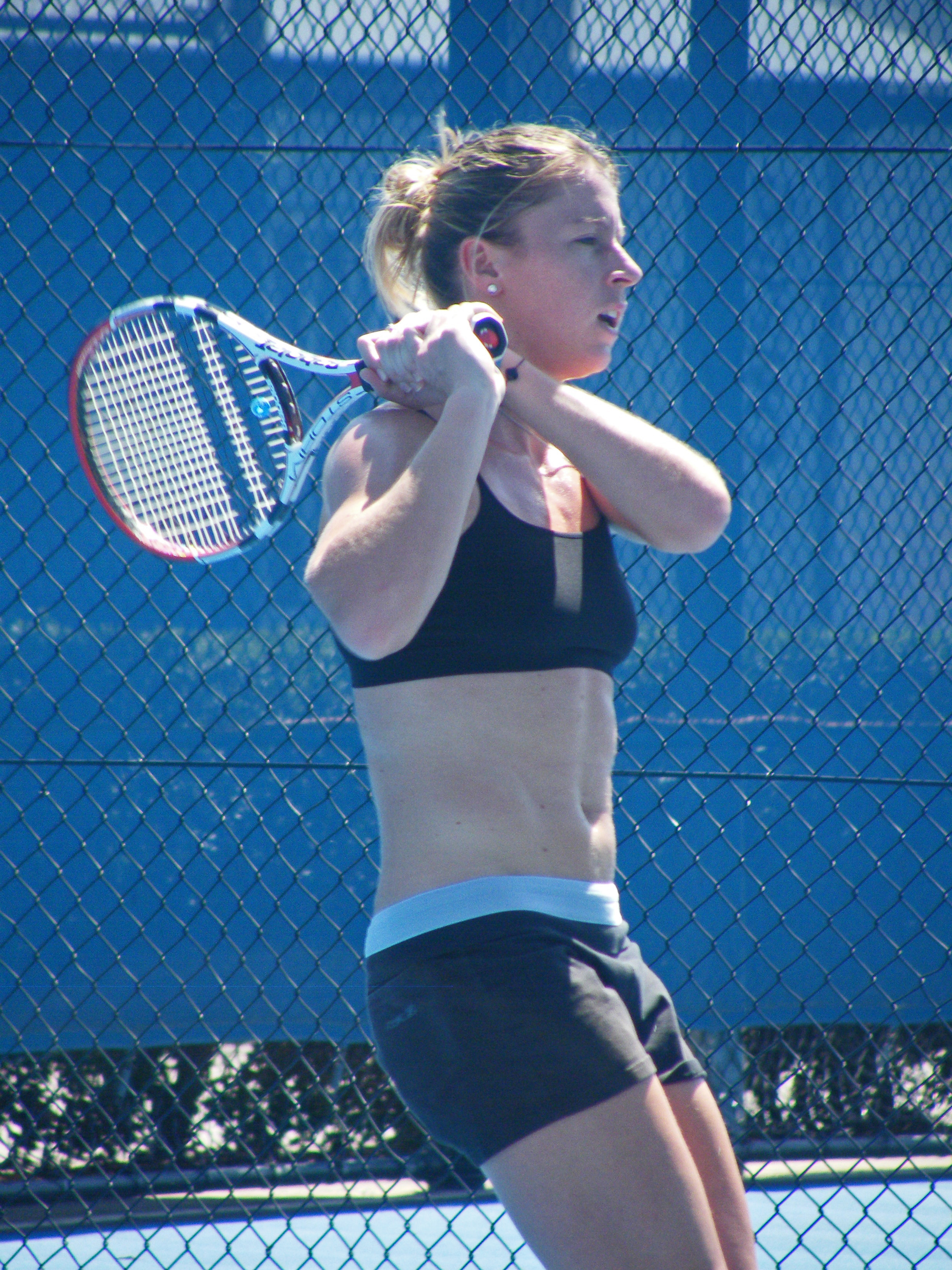
Pauline Parmentier

(France) Pauline Parmentier defeated (Belarus) Victoria Azarenka, 7–5, 6–2

=== Doubles ===
(Belarus) Ekaterina Dzehalevich / (Belarus) Anastasiya Yakimova defeated (Belarus) Tatiana Poutchek / (Russia) Anastasia Rodionova, 2–6, 6–4, [10–7]

== Key ==
- A - Alternate
- LL - Lucky loser
- Q - Qualifier
- r - Retired
- w/o - Walkover
- WC - Wildcard

== Singles seeds ==
1. (Belarus) Victoria Azarenka (final)
2. (Slovakia) Dominika Cibulková (first round)
3. (Belarus) Olga Govortsova (semifinals)
4. (Russia) Elena Vesnina (semifinals)
5. (Romania) Ioana Raluca Olaru (quarterfinals)
6. (Russia) Alla Kudryavtseva (first round)
7. (Russia) Olga Poutchkova (second round)
8. (Russia) Anastasia Rodionova (first round)

== Singles draw ==
=== Last rounds ===
Semifinals
1	(Belarus) Victoria Azarenka	6	6
4	(Russia) Elena Vesnina	4	2
3	(Belarus) Olga Govortsova	2	5
(France) Pauline Parmentier	6	7

Finals
1	(Belarus) Victoria Azarenka	5	2
(France) Pauline Parmentier	7	6

=== Section 1 ===
First round
1	(Belarus) V Azarenka	6	6
(Chinese Taipei) Hsieh SW	3	4
Q	(China) Zhang S	3	6^{0}
Q	(Russia) E Rodina	6	7^{7}
Q	(Kyrgyzstan) K Palkina	6	6
Q	(Belarus) E Dzehalevich	2	2
WC	(Uzbekistan) V Ekshibarova	6	6
6	(Russia) A Kudryavtseva	2	3
4	(Russia) E Vesnina	6	6
(Italy) A Brianti	3	4
(Belarus) T Poutchek	6	6
(France) M Johansson	0	2
LL	(Ukraine) M Koryttseva	6	6
WC	(Uzbekistan) D Saidkhodjaeva	1	2
(Czech Republic) P Cetkovská	6	0	1
5	(Romania) IR Olaru	3	6	6

Second round
1	(Belarus) V Azarenka	6	6
Q	(Russia) E Rodina	4	3
Q	(Kyrgyzstan) K Palkina	7	5	7
WC	(Uzbekistan) V Ekshibarova	5	7	5
4	(Russia) E Vesnina	7	6
(Belarus) T Poutchek	5	4
LL	(Ukraine) M Koryttseva	2	2
5	(Romania) IR Olaru	6	6

Quarterfinals
1	(Belarus) V Azarenka	6	6
Q	(Kyrgyzstan) K Palkina	2	1
4	(Russia) E Vesnina	2	7^{7}	6
5	(Romania) IR Olaru	6	6^{2}	4

Semifinals
1	(Belarus) V Azarenka	6	6
4	(Russia) E Vesnina	4	2

=== Section 2 ===
First round
8	(Russia) A Rodionova	0	3
(Belarus) A Yakimova	6	6
(Germany) J Schruff	6	3	2
(United Kingdom) K O'Brien	3	6	6
(Ukraine) Y Fedak	0	3
(Luxembourg) A Kremer	6	6
(Czech Republic) R Voráčová	3	3
3	(Belarus) O Govortsova	6	6
7	(Russia) O Poutchkova	7	6
WC	(Uzbekistan) I Tulyaganova	5	3
(Czech Republic) H Šromová	3	6^{2}
(Uzbekistan) A Amanmuradova	6	7^{7}
(Russia) V Manasieva	6	4	6
(Russia) G Voskoboeva	3	6	1
(France) P Parmentier	6	6
2	(Slovakia) D Cibulková	2	2

Second round
(Belarus) A Yakimova	3	6^{1}
Q	(United Kingdom) K O'Brien	6	7^{7}
(Luxembourg) A Kremer	6	3	2
3	(Belarus) O Govortsova	2	6	6
7	(Russia) O Poutchkova	3	4
(Uzbekistan) A Amanmuradova	6	6
(Russia) V Manasieva	2	1
(France) P Parmentier	6	6

Quarterfinals
3	(Belarus) O Govortsova	6	6
Q	(United Kingdom) K O'Brien	2	3
(Uzbekistan) A Amanmuradova	4	3
(France) P Parmentier	6	6

Semifinals
3	(Belarus) O Govortsova	2	5
(France) P Parmentier	6	7

== Doubles seeds ==
1. (Belarus) Tatiana Poutchek / (Russia) Anastasia Rodionova (finals)
2. (Ukraine) Mariya Koryttseva / (Belarus) Darya Kustova (first round)
3. (Russia) Evgeniya Rodina / (Russia) Galina Voskoboeva (quarterfinals)
4. (Poland) Marta Domachowska / (Czech Republic) Renata Voráčová (semifinals)

== Doubles draw ==
First round
1	(Belarus) T Poutchek (Russia) A Rodionova	6	4	[10]
(Romania) IR Olaru (Romania) A Perianu	2	6	[7]
A	(Uzbekistan) A Baranova (Uzbekistan) S Hatamova	0	1
(Kyrgyzstan) K Palkina (China) Zhang S	6	6
4	(Poland) M Domachowska (Czech Republic) R Voráčová	6	6
(France) M Johansson (France) P Parmentier	4	3
(Belarus) O Govortsova (Russia) O Poutchkova	6	6
(Czech Republic) P Cetkovská (Czech Republic) H Šromová	3	4
(Belarus) E Dzehalevich (Belarus) A Yakimova	6	6
WC	(Uzbekistan) A Khabibulina (Uzbekistan) D Saidkhodjaeva	2	2
(Uzbekistan) V Ekshibarova (Uzbekistan) D Narzykulova	0	0
3	(Russia) E Rodina (Russia) G Voskoboeva	6	6
(Luxembourg) Anne Kremer (Russia) V Manasieva	3	6	[5]
(Uzbekistan) A Amanmuradova (United Kingdom) K O'Brien	6'	4	[10]
(Italy) A Brianti (Germany) J Schruff	2	6	[10]
2	(Ukraine) M Koryttseva (Belarus) D Kustova	6	2	[8]

Quarterfinals
1	(Belarus) T Poutchek (Russia) A Rodionova	6	7^{8}
(Kyrgyzstan) K Palkina (China) Zhang S	1	6^{6}
4	(Poland) M Domachowska (Czech Republic) R Voráčová	6	4	[10]
(Belarus) O Govortsova (Russia) O Poutchkova	3	6	[5]
(Belarus) E Dzehalevich (Belarus) A Yakimova	w	/	o
3	(Russia) E Rodina (Russia) G Voskoboeva
(Uzbekistan) A Amanmuradova (United Kingdom) K O'Brien	4
(Italy) A Brianti (Germany) J Schruff	1	r

Semifinals
1	(Belarus) T Poutchek (Russia) A Rodionova	6	7^{7}
4	(Poland) M Domachowska (Czech Republic) R Voráčová	3	6^{1}
(Belarus) E Dzehalevich (Belarus) A Yakimova	7^{7}	6
(Uzbekistan) A Amanmuradova (United Kingdom) K O'Brien	6^{2}	3

Finals
1	(Belarus) T Poutchek (Russia) A Rodionova	6	4	[7]
(Belarus) E Dzehalevich (Belarus) A Yakimova	2	6	[10]
