= Tashkent Open =

Defunct tennis tournament
- Tour: WTA Tour
- Founded: 1999; 27 years ago
- Abolished: 2019; 7 years ago
- Location: Tashkent, Uzbekistan
- Category: Tier IV (1999–2008); International (2009–2019); WTA 125s (2020)
- Surface: Hard / Outdoors
- Website: tashkentopen.uz

The Tashkent Open by Zeromax was a women's tennis tournament held in Tashkent, Uzbekistan. First held in 1999, this WTA Tour event is an International tournament and is played on outdoor hard courts. Since 2014, the event has been scheduled in early autumn, during the same week as the Wuhan Open. In 2020, the tournament was replaced by the Lyon Open.

== Past finals ==
=== Women's singles ===
Year	Champion	Runner-up	Score
1999	(Israel) Anna Smashnova	(Belgium) Laurence Courtois	6–3, 6–3
2000	(Uzbekistan) Iroda Tulyaganova	(Italy) Francesca Schiavone	6–3, 2–6, 6–3
2001	(Germany) Bianka Lamade	(Netherlands) Seda Noorlander	6–3, 2–6, 6–2
2002	(Switzerland) Marie-Gayanay Mikaelian	(Belarus) Tatiana Poutchek	6–4, 6–4
2003	(Spain) Virginia Ruano Pascual	(Japan) Saori Obata	6–2, 7–6^{(7–2)}
2004	(Czech Republic) Nicole Vaidišová	(France) Virginie Razzano	5–7, 6–3, 6–2
2005	(Netherlands) Michaëlla Krajicek	(Uzbekistan) Akgul Amanmuradova	6–0, 4–6, 6–3
2006	(China) Sun Tiantian	(Uzbekistan) Iroda Tulyaganova	6–2, 6–4
2007	(France) Pauline Parmentier	(Belarus) Victoria Azarenka	7–5, 6–2
2008	(Romania) Sorana Cîrstea	(Germany) Sabine Lisicki	2–6, 6–4, 7–6^{(7–4)}
2009	(Israel) Shahar Pe'er	(Uzbekistan) Akgul Amanmuradova	6–3, 6–4
2010	(Russia) Alla Kudryavtseva	(Russia) Elena Vesnina	6–4, 6–4
2011	(Russia) Ksenia Pervak	(Czech Republic) Eva Birnerová	6–3, 6–1
2012	(Romania) Irina-Camelia Begu	(Croatia) Donna Vekić	6–4, 6–4
2013	(Serbia) Bojana Jovanovski	(Belarus) Olga Govortsova	4–6, 7–5, 7–6^{(7–3)}
2014	(Italy) Karin Knapp	(Serbia) Bojana Jovanovski	6–2, 7–6^{(7–4)}
2015	(Japan) Nao Hibino	(Croatia) Donna Vekić	6–2, 6–2
2016	(Czech Republic) Kristýna Plíšková	(Japan) Nao Hibino	6–3, 2–6, 6–3
2017	(Ukraine) Kateryna Bondarenko	(Hungary) Tímea Babos	6–4, 6–4
2018	(Russia) Margarita Gasparyan	(Russia) Anastasia Potapova	6–2, 6–1
2019	(Belgium) Alison Van Uytvanck	(Romania) Sorana Cîrstea	6–2, 4–6, 6–4

=== Women's doubles ===
Year	Champions	Runners-up	Score
1999	(Russia) Evgenia Kulikovskaya (Austria) Patricia Wartusch	(Spain) Eva Bes-Ostariz (Spain) Gisela Riera	7–6^{(7–3)}, 6–0
2000	(China) Li Na (China) Li Ting	(Uzbekistan) Iroda Tulyaganova (Ukraine) Anna Zaporozhanova	3–6, 6–2, 6–4
2001	(Hungary) Petra Mandula (Austria) Patricia Wartusch	(Ukraine) Tatiana Perebiynis (Belarus) Tatiana Poutchek	6–1, 6–4
2002	(Ukraine) Tatiana Perebiynis (Belarus) Tatiana Poutchek	(Germany) Mia Buric (Russia) Galina Fokina	7–5, 6–2
2003	(Ukraine) Yuliya Beygelzimer (Belarus) Tatiana Poutchek (2)	(China) Li Ting (China) Sun Tiantian	6–3, 7–6^{(7–0)}
2004	(Italy) Adriana Serra Zanetti (Italy) Antonella Serra Zanetti	(France) Marion Bartoli (Italy) Mara Santangelo	1–6, 6–3, 6–4
2005	(Italy) Maria Elena Camerin (France) Émilie Loit	(Russia) Anastasia Rodionova (Russia) Galina Voskoboeva	6–3, 6–0
2006	(Belarus) Victoria Azarenka (Belarus) Tatiana Poutchek (3)	(Italy) Maria Elena Camerin (Switzerland) Emmanuelle Gagliardi	Walkover
2007	(Belarus) Ekaterina Dzehalevich (Belarus) Anastasiya Yakimova	(Belarus) Tatiana Poutchek (Russia) Anastasia Rodionova	2–6, 6–4, [10–7]
2008	(Romania) Raluca Olaru (Ukraine) Olga Savchuk	(Russia) Nina Bratchikova (Germany) Kathrin Wörle	5–7, 7–5, [10–7]
2009	(Belarus) Olga Govortsova (Belarus) Tatiana Poutchek (4)	(Russia) Vitalia Diatchenko (Belarus) Ekaterina Dzehalevich	6–2, 6–7^{(1–7)}, [10–8]
2010	(Russia) Alexandra Panova (Belarus) Tatiana Poutchek (5)	(Romania) Alexandra Dulgheru (Slovakia) Magdaléna Rybáriková	6–3, 6–4
2011	(Greece) Eleni Daniilidou (Russia) Vitalia Diatchenko	(Ukraine) Lyudmyla Kichenok (Ukraine) Nadiia Kichenok	6–4, 6–3
2012	(Poland) Paula Kania (Belarus) Polina Pekhova	(Russia) Anna Chakvetadze (Serbia) Vesna Dolonc	6–2, ret.
2013	(Hungary) Tímea Babos (Kazakhstan) Yaroslava Shvedova	(Belarus) Olga Govortsova (Luxembourg) Mandy Minella	6–3, 6–3
2014	(Serbia) Aleksandra Krunić (Czech Republic) Kateřina Siniaková	(Russia) Margarita Gasparyan (Russia) Alexandra Panova	6–2, 6–1
2015	(Russia) Margarita Gasparyan (Russia) Alexandra Panova (2)	(Russia) Vera Dushevina (Czech Republic) Kateřina Siniaková	6–1, 3–6, [10–3]
2016	(Romania) Raluca Olaru (2) (Turkey) İpek Soylu	(Netherlands) Demi Schuurs (Czech Republic) Renata Voráčová	7–5, 6–3
2017	(Hungary) Tímea Babos (2) (Czech Republic) Andrea Hlaváčková	(Japan) Nao Hibino (Georgia (country)) Oksana Kalashnikova	7–5, 6–4
2018	(Serbia) Olga Danilović (Slovenia) Tamara Zidanšek	(Romania) Irina-Camelia Begu (Romania) Raluca Olaru	7–5, 6–3
2019	(United States) Hayley Carter (Brazil) Luisa Stefani	(Slovenia) Dalila Jakupović (United States) Sabrina Santamaria	6–3, 7–6^{(7–4)}

== See also ==
- List of tennis tournaments
- ATP Tashkent Open – Men's tennis tournament
