= Nicole Vaidišová =

Czech tennis player (born 1989)

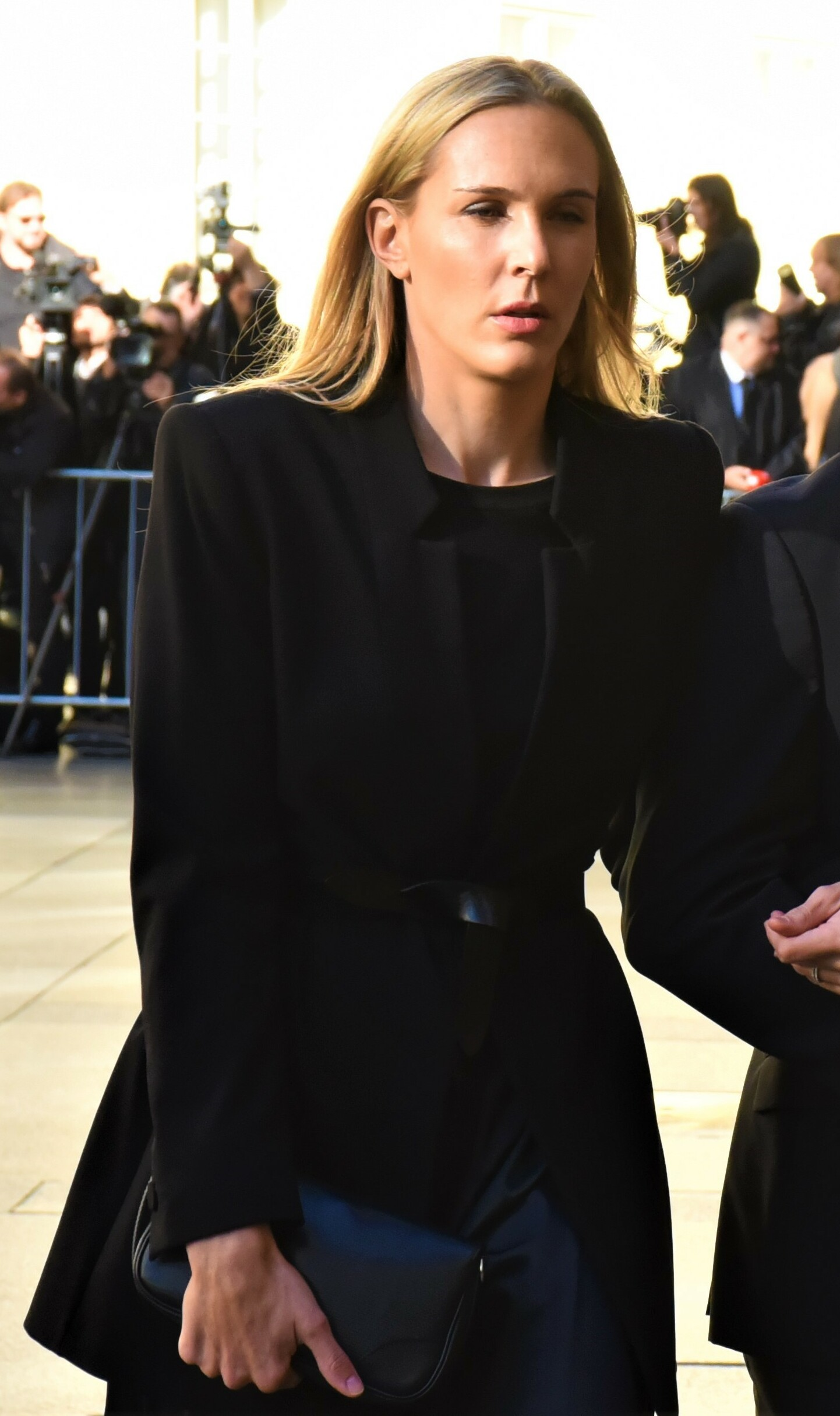
- Vaidišová in 2019
- Country (sports): Czech Republic
- Residence: Prague, Czech Republic
- Born: 23 April 1989 (age 37) Nuremberg, West Germany
- Height: 1.83 m (6 ft 0 in)
- Turned pro: 2003
- Retired: 2016
- Plays: Right-handed (two-handed backhand)
- Prize money: US$ 2,778,619

Singles
- Career record: 225–116
- Career titles: 6 WTA, 2 ITF
- Highest ranking: No. 7 (14 May 2007)

Grand Slam singles results
- Australian Open: SF (2007)
- French Open: SF (2006)
- Wimbledon: QF (2007, 2008)
- US Open: 4R (2005)

Other tournaments
- Olympic Games: 1R (2008)

Doubles
- Career record: 13–31
- Career titles: 0
- Highest ranking: No. 128 (2 October 2006)

Grand Slam doubles results
- Australian Open: 3R (2008)
- French Open: 1R (2006, 2009)
- Wimbledon: 2R (2006, 2007)
- US Open: 1R (2005)

Other doubles tournaments
- Olympic Games: 1R (2008)

Mixed doubles
- Career record: 4–3

Grand Slam mixed doubles results
- French Open: 2R (2005)
- Wimbledon: 3R (2008)
- US Open: 2R (2005)

Nicole Vaidišová Štěpánková (Czech pronunciation: [ˈnɪkol ˈvajɟɪʃovaː]; born 23 April 1989) is a Czech former professional tennis player.

Vaidišová is an Australian Open and French Open semifinalist as well as a two-time quarterfinalist at Wimbledon. She started playing tennis when she was six years old, enrolling to train at Nick Bollettieri's tennis academy in Bradenton, Florida. Her serve was considered her biggest weapon. Her powerful groundstrokes, with her serve, collaborated well together to produce an aggressive, all-round game. On 9 August 2006, at the age of 17 years, she became the 12th-youngest player in WTA Tour history to be ranked in the top 10. She achieved a career-high ranking of world No. 7, on 14 May 2007. Her form dipped shortly after, and at the time her retirement was announced in 2010, she was ranked at No. 177.

Her stepfather announced that she had retired in March 2010, citing "lack of interest in tennis" as the primary reason, but she returned to the sport in September 2014. However, in July 2016, she retired a second time due to injuries.

== Career ==
=== 2003–2004: Instant success ===
Vaidišová debuted in 2003 by reaching three consecutive finals and winning the ITF tournament in Plzeň, Czech Republic.

In 2004, her first full year as a professional, Vaidišová finished the year as a top 100 player. As a qualifier at only her third WTA Tour main draw at inaugural Vancouver, she became the sixth-youngest singles champion in tour history at an age of 15 years, three months, and 23 days. She also became the lowest-ranked player (No. 180) and second qualifier (of three) to win a title in 2004. During the summer, she played World TeamTennis for the Sacramento Capitals and was named the league's Female MVP and Female Rookie of the Year. Vaidišová won her second title of the year at the Tashkent Open, defeating Virginie Razzano in the final. On 18 October, she made her top 100 debut at No. 74, becoming the youngest player in the top 100 at the time.

Later in the year, Vaidišová reached the quarterfinals at the Japan Open in Tokyo. She made her Grand Slam debut at the US Open, losing to defending champion and No. 1, Justine Henin, in the first round.

Vaidišová finished the year with two WTA titles and a win–loss record of 31–8.

=== 2005–2007: Consistency and top 10 debut ===
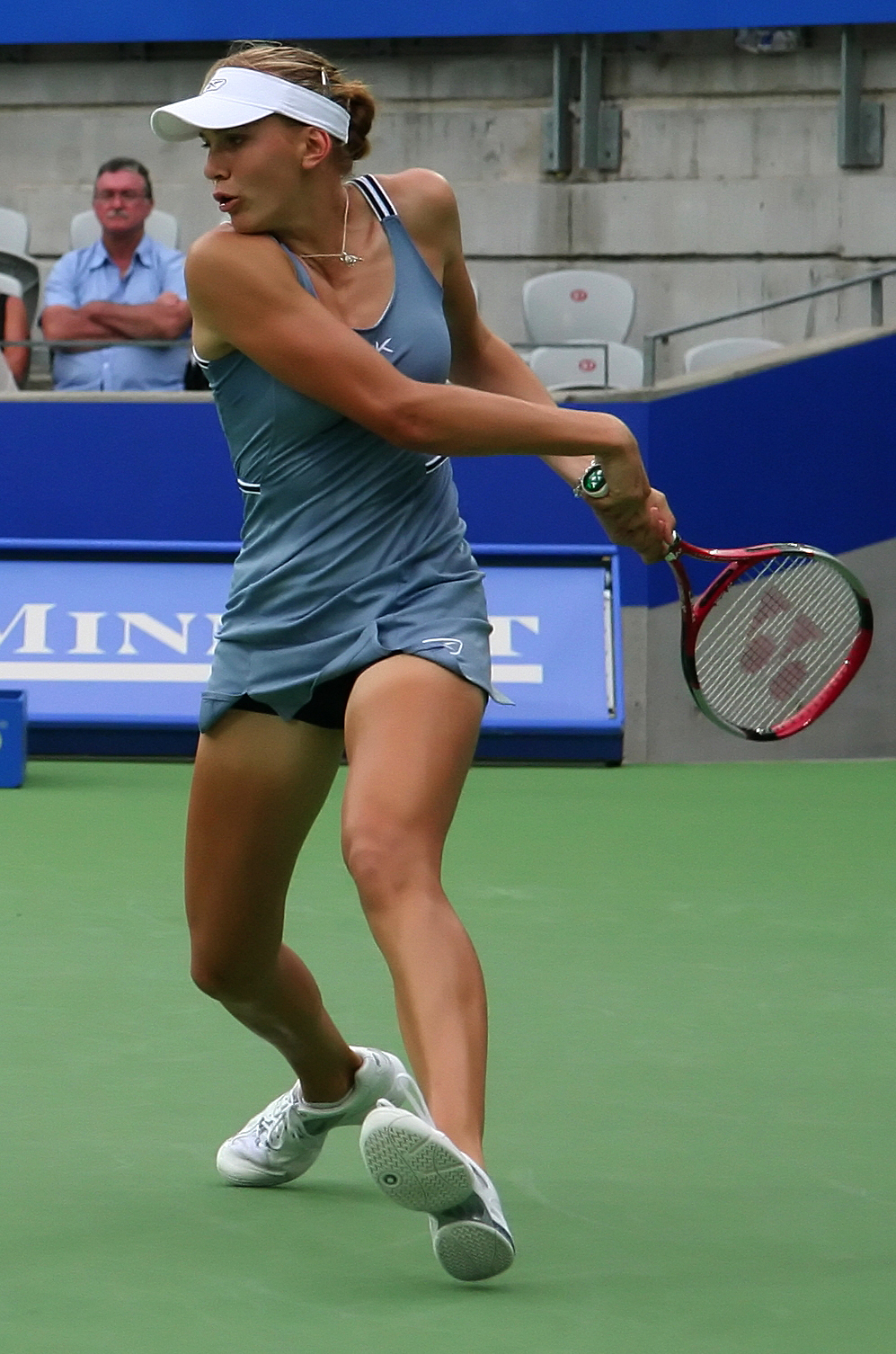
Vaidišová – 2006 Sydney International

In early January, Vaidišová reached her first quarterfinal of the season in Hobart. She picked up her first Grand Slam singles victory in her Australian Open debut, by reaching the third round before falling to top seed Lindsay Davenport.

In April, she made her top 50 debut at No. 47 and reached her first career Tier I quarterfinal at the Charleston Open. She posted her first top 10 victory over defending French Open champion Anastasia Myskina, before eventually losing to Patty Schnyder in the quarterfinals, and making her top 40 debut as a result at No. 34 on 18 April. In May, Vaidišová reached her first Tier III final in Istanbul, losing to top seed Venus Williams in the championship match. She made her debut at the French Open where she fell to 22nd-seeded Francesca Schiavone in the second round.

In August, Vaidišová reached the quarterfinals at Toronto, losing to Justine Henin. At the US Open, she reached the fourth round for the first time at a Grand Slam event before losing to Nadia Petrova.

Vaidišová captured her first title of 2005 (and third of her career) in Seoul, defeating top seed Jelena Janković in the final without dropping a set during the week. She followed by winning her second straight tour singles title in Tokyo, winning when Tatiana Golovin retired in the final. On 10 October, Vaidišová made her top 20 debut at No. 18 and extended her winning streak to 15 matches, by winning her third consecutive tour singles title and fifth of her career; she defeated Nadia Petrova for the first time in the final of the Bangkok. With her three consecutive titles, Vaidišová became the first player since Lindsay Davenport in 2004 to win three titles in three weeks, and also became the sixth woman to win five tour singles titles before her 17th birthday (after Tracy Austin, Andrea Jaeger, Monica Seles, Jennifer Capriati and Martina Hingis).

Vaidišová captured her sixth WTA Tour title at the Tier III event in Strasbourg in May 2006. In June, she made a semifinal run at the French Open, her best Grand Slam performance to date. She defeated world No. 1 and home favourite, Amélie Mauresmo, in the fourth round and Venus Williams in the quarterfinal. However, she lost to Svetlana Kuznetsova in the next round, despite being only two points away from victory several times. At Wimbledon, she got to the fourth round before losing to Li Na. Vaidišová's fourth-round appearance meant that she has advanced to the round of 16 or better in each of the four Grand Slam tournaments.

In July, Vaidišová went 2–0 during the Czech Republic's 3–2 Fed Cup World Group play-offs loss to France. She reached the semifinal on her debut in Stanford, losing to Kim Clijsters. Vaidišová reached her career-first Tier I semifinal in San Diego, losing to Clijsters again. After her success in San Diego, Vaidišová moved from No. 12 to No. 9, her first career top 10 debut, becoming the 12th-youngest player in tour history to crack the top 10, at an age of 17 years, three months and two weeks.

At the US Open, she made it to the third round, but lost to Jelena Janković, who later made it to the semifinal. Vaidišová defeated Mauresmo for the second time at the Kremlin Cup, after rallying from 1–6, 2–5 down and three match points in their quarterfinal match. However, she lost to Nadia Petrova for a third time in their four meetings in the semifinal afterwards. She managed to finish 2006 at No. 10, making it her most successful season.

Beginning 2007, Vaidišová reached the semifinals of the Sydney International, beating Ana Ivanovic for the first time before falling to Jelena Janković. She went on to reach her second Grand Slam semifinal at the Australian Open, losing to eventual champion Serena Williams.

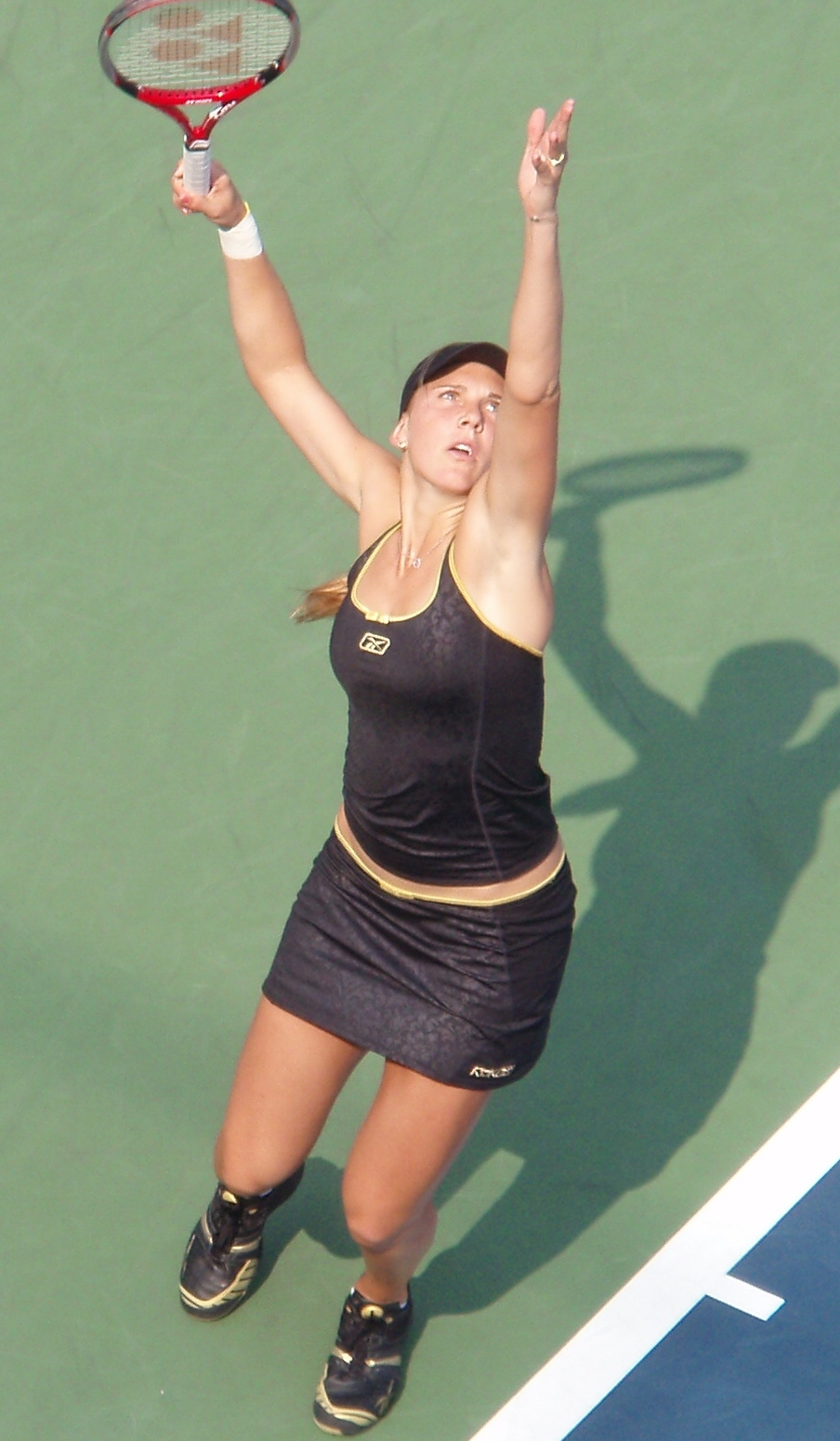
Vaidišová at the 2007 US Open

She skipped a large majority of the clay season with a right wrist injury. However, she reached the quarterfinals of the French Open, where she was defeated by Jelena Janković.

In her first grass-court tournament of the season at Eastbourne, Vaidišová lost in the quarterfinals to Justine Henin. At Wimbledon, she lost to Ana Ivanovic in the quarterfinals after failing to convert three match points. She earlier had defeated defending champion Amélie Mauresmo in the fourth round and Victoria Azarenka in the third round.

Vaidišová was out for two months after Wimbledon due to glandular fever. She returned at the US Open, where she lost to Shahar Pe'er in the third round. Moving into the indoor season, she played the Kremlin Cup, losing to Serena Williams in the quarterfinals. The next week in Zürich, Vaidišová reached the semifinals, achieving a notable victory over Jelena Janković. In the semifinals, she lost to Justine Henin in three sets. She finished the year by making another semifinal in Linz.

=== 2008–2010: Struggles and retirement ===
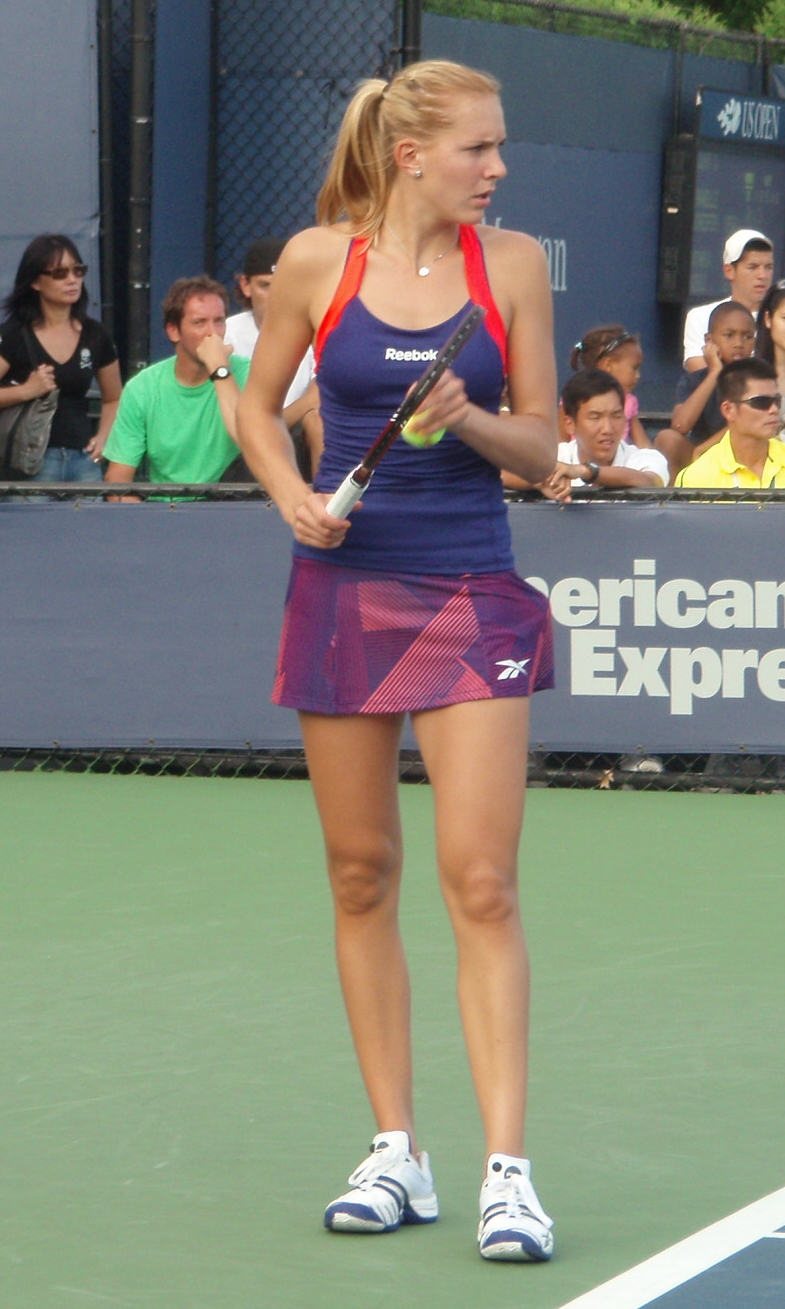
Vaidišová at the 2009 US Open

Vaidišová played three hardcourt tournaments in Australia to start the year. She reached the semifinals of the Sydney International, defeating Jelena Janković in the quarterfinals before losing to Svetlana Kuznetsova in the semifinals.

The week after the Australian Open, Vaidišová won both of her Fed Cup singles matches in the tie against Slovakia. Following that, she lost six consecutive matches.

As the 18th seed at Wimbledon, she had an unexpected run to the quarterfinals, losing to Zheng Jie.

She finished the year with another pair of consecutive losses, and had tumbled to No. 41 in the world over the course of the season.

In 2009, Vaidišová's ranking fell out of the top 100. She often was spotted watching numerous matches of her boyfriend Radek Štěpánek. At the end of the year, Vaidišová was ranked No. 187.

Vaidišová started 2010 by playing ITF Women's Circuit events. Later in March, her stepfather and former coach Ales Kodat announced her decision to retire from her professional career at the age of 20 due to a lack of interest in tennis. "Her agent told me last week... she's fed up with tennis and that's understandable. She started very young", Kodat said. Kodat said she had turned down a wildcard to play in Miami starting on 23 March.

=== 2014: Comeback ===
Vaidišová received a wildcard to compete in the ITF Albuquerque, a $75k event, starting on 15 September. This marked her return to professional tennis in over four years. She won her first match in straight sets against Sesil Karatantcheva, before losing in the second round to Johanna Konta 6–1, 1–6, 4–6.

=== 2015 ===
At the Monterrey Open in March, she qualified for her first WTA Tour main draw since 2010 but she drew top seed and defending champion Ana Ivanovic in the first round. Vaidišová lost 1–6, 6–7; she had qualified for the main draw only seven hours before her match against Ivanovic.

She played at Miami Open as wildcard. She won her first-round match against Tímea Babos in straight sets, and lost in the second round to No. 3 seed Simona Halep, in three sets.

=== 2016: Second retirement ===
In July, Vaidišová announced her second and permanent retirement from professional tennis.

== Personal life ==
Vaidišová was introduced to tennis by her mother Riana. She has three younger brothers, Filip, Oliver and Toby. She speaks Czech, English, and German.

Vaidišová became engaged to fellow Czech tennis player Radek Štěpánek, who is 11 years older, in late 2007. It has been suggested that the relationship was the cause of Vaidišová's decline in tennis. The two married on 17 July 2010 at Prague Castle. In June 2013, Vaidišová and Štěpánek announced that they had filed for divorce. In 2018, they remarried and became parents of a daughter, Stella. In December 2021, she gave birth to a second daughter, Meda.

== Endorsements ==
Vaidišová was the face of Reebok and has been featured in their "I Am What I Am" and "Run Easy" campaigns. She also endorsed Citizen Watches and its Eco-Drive design. She is represented by Olivier van Lindonk of IMG. During her career, she used Yonex racquets.

In 2007, Vaidišová was featured in Virtua Tennis 3, a videogame developed by Sega and released for PlayStation 3, Xbox 360, Microsoft Windows and PlayStation Portable.

== Performance timelines ==
Key
W	F	SF	QF	#R	RR	Q#	P#	DNQ	A	Z#	PO	G	S	B	NMS	NTI	P	NH

(W) winner; (F) finalist; (SF) semifinalist; (QF) quarterfinalist; (#R) rounds 4, 3, 2, 1; (RR) round-robin stage; (Q#) qualification round; (P#) preliminary round; (DNQ) did not qualify; (A) absent; (Z#) Davis/Fed Cup Zonal Group (with number indication) or (PO) play-off; (G) gold, (S) silver or (B) bronze Olympic/Paralympic medal; (NMS) not a Masters tournament; (NTI) not a Tier I tournament; (P) postponed; (NH) not held; (SR) strike rate (events won / competed); (W–L) win–loss record.
To avoid confusion and double counting, these charts are updated at the conclusion of a tournament or when the player's participation has ended.

Only main-draw results in WTA Tour, Grand Slam tournaments, Fed Cup and Olympic Games are included in win–loss records.

=== Singles ===
Tournament	2004	2005	2006	2007	2008	2009	2010	...	2015	SR	W–L	W%
Grand Slam tournaments
Australian Open	A	3R	4R	SF	4R	1R	A		A	0 / 5	13–5	72%
French Open	Q3	2R	SF	QF	1R	1R	A		A	0 / 5	10–5	67%
Wimbledon	Q1	3R	4R	QF	QF	1R	A		A	0 / 5	13–5	72%
US Open	1R	4R	3R	3R	2R	Q1	A		A	0 / 5	8–5	62%
Win–loss	0–1	8–4	13–4	15–4	8–4	0–3	0–0		0–0	0 / 20	44–20	69%
Olympic Games
Summer Olympics	A	NH			1R	NH			NH	0 / 1	0–1	0%
Premier M & Premier 5 + former
Dubai / Qatar Open (Note: The first Premier 5 event of the year has switched back and forth between the Dubai Tennis Championships and the Qatar Ladies Open since 2009. Dubai was classified as a Premier 5 event from 2009 to 2011 before being succeeded by Doha for the 2012–2014 period. In 2015, Dubai regained its Premier 5 status while Doha was demoted to Premier status. The Premier 5 tournaments were reclassified as WTA 1000 tournaments in 2021.)	NMS				A	A	A		A	0 / 0	0–0	–
Indian Wells Open	A	3R	A	QF	2R	3R	A		A	0 / 4	7–4	64%
Miami Open	1R	3R	A	QF	2R	3R	A		2R	0 / 6	8–6	57%
Berlin / Madrid Open (Note: In 2009, the German Open was replaced by the Madrid Open. The Premier Mandatory tournaments were reclassified as WTA 1000 tournaments in 2021.)	A	A	A	A	1R	A	A		A	0 / 1	0–1	0%
Italian Open	A	A	2R	A	1R	Q2	A		A	0 / 2	1–2	33%
Canadian Open	A	QF	3R (Note: Withdrawal during the tournament. Not counted as a loss.)	A	1R	A	A		A	0 / 3	4–2	67%
Pan Pacific / Wuhan Open (Note: In 2014, the Pan Pacific Open was downgraded to a Premier event and replaced by the Wuhan Open. The Premier 5 tournaments were reclassified as WTA 1000 tournaments in 2021.)	A	A	QF	A	A	A	A		A	0 / 1	2–1	67%
Charleston Open (former)	A	QF	2R	2R	A	NMS				0 / 3	3–3	50%
Southern California Open (former)	A	A	SF	A	A	NH				0 / 1	3–1	75%
Kremlin Cup (former)	A	A	SF	QF	1R	NMS				0 / 3	5–3	63%
Zürich Open (former)	A	A	1R	SF	NH/NMS					0 / 2	3–2	60%
Win–loss	0–1	10–4	10–6	11–5	0–6	4–2	0–0		1–1	0 / 26	36–25	59%
Career statistics
	2004	2005	2006	2007	2008	2009	2010	...	2015	SR	W–L	W%
Tournaments	7	17	18	14	19	12	1		3	Career total: 91		
Titles	2	3	1	0	0	0	0		0	Career total: 6		
Finals	2	4	1	0	0	0	0		0	Career total: 7		
Hard win–loss	12–4	35–8	18–9	24–9	11–13	5–6	1–1		1–3	5 / 59	107–53	67%
Clay win–loss	2–1	8–4	13–4	6–2	0–3	2–4	0–0		0–0	1 / 18	31–18	63%
Grass win–loss	0–0	3–3	3–1	6–2	6–3	0–1	0–0		0–0	0 / 10	18–10	64%
Carpet win–loss	0–0	2–0	5–2	1–1	2–0	0–1	0–0		0–0	0 / 4	10–4	71%
Overall win–loss	14–5	48–15	39–16	37–14	19–19	7–12	1–1		1–3	6 / 91	166–85	66%
Win%	74%	76%	71%	73%	50%	37%	50%		25%	Career total: 66%		
Year-end ranking	77	15	10	12	41	188	495		257	$2,778,619		

=== Doubles ===
Tournament	2004	2005	2006	2007	2008	2009	2010	SR	W–L	W%
Grand Slam tournaments
Australian Open	A	A	1R	1R	3R	A	A	0 / 3	2–3	40%
French Open	A	A	1R	A	A	1R	A	0 / 2	0–2	0%
Wimbledon	A	1R	2R	2R	A	1R	A	0 / 4	2–4	33%
US Open	A	A	A	A	A	A	A	0 / 0	0–0	–
Win–loss	0–0	0–2	1–3	1–2	2–1	0–2	0–0	0 / 9	4–9	31%
Olympic Games
Summer Olympics	A	NH			1R	NH		0 / 1	0–1	0%
Premier M & Premier 5 + former
Indian Wells Open	A	Q1	A	2R	A	A	A	0 / 1	1–1	50%
Miami Open	1R	2R	A	A	1R	A	A	0 / 3	1–3	25%
Italian Open	A	A	A	A	1R	A	A	0 / 1	0–1	0%
Pan Pacific Open	A	A	1R	A	A	A	A	0 / 1	0–1	0%
Charleston Open (former)	A	1R	2R	A	A	NMS		0 / 2	1–2	33%
Kremlin Cup (former)	A	A	1R	A	A	NMS		0 / 1	0–1	0%
Win–loss	0–1	1–2	1–3	1–1	0–2	0–0	0–0	0 / 9	3–9	25%
Career statistics
Tournaments	3	5	7	3	6	3	1	Career total: 28		
Overall win–loss	0–3	3–6	3–7	2–3	3–6	1–3	0–1	0 / 28	12–29	29%
Year-end ranking	747	192	187	218	245	481	n/a			

== WTA career finals ==
=== Singles: 7 (6 titles, 1 runner-up) ===
Legend
Grand Slam
Premier M & Premier 5
Premier
International (6–1)

Result	W–L	Date	Tournament	Tier	Surface	Opponent	Score
Win	1–0	Aug 2004	Vancouver Open, Canada	Tier V (Note: Includes WTA Premier and WTA International tournaments. The WTA Tier II tournaments were reclassified as WTA Premier tournaments in 2009, while the WTA Tier III tournaments, WTA Tier IV tournaments and WTA Tier V tournaments were reclassified as WTA International tournaments the same year .)	Hard	(United States) Laura Granville	2–6, 6–4, 6–2
Win	2–0	Oct 2004	Tashkent Open, Uzbekistan	Tier IV	Hard	(France) Virginie Razzano	5–7, 6–3, 6–2
Loss	2–1	May 2005	İstanbul Cup, Turkey	Tier III	Clay	(United States) Venus Williams	3–6, 2–6
Win	3–1	Oct 2005	Korea Open, South Korea	Tier IV	Hard	(Serbia and Montenegro) Jelena Janković	7–5, 6–3
Win	4–1	Oct 2005	Japan Open	Tier III	Hard	(France) Tatiana Golovin	7–6^{(7–4)}, 3–2, ret.
Win	5–1	Oct 2005	Bangkok Open, Thailand	Tier III	Hard	(Russia) Nadia Petrova	6–1, 6–7^{(5–7)}, 7–5
Win	6–1	May 2006	Internationaux de Strasbourg, France	Tier III	Clay	(China) Peng Shuai	7–6^{(9–7)}, 6–3

== ITF finals ==
=== Singles: 3 (2 titles, 1 runner-up) ===
Legend $100,000 tournaments $75,000 tournaments $50,000 tournaments $25,000 tournaments $10,000 tournaments	Finals by surface Hard (1–1) Clay (0–0) Grass (0–0) Carpet (1–0)

Result	W–L	Date	Tournament	Tier	Surface	Opponent	Score
Win	1–0	Oct 2003	ITF Plzeň, Czech Republic	10,000	Carpet (i)	(Czech Republic) Andrea Hlaváčková	7–6^{(7–5)}, 6–4
Loss	1–1	Feb 2004	Midland Tennis Classic, United States	75,000	Hard (i)	(United States) Jill Craybas	2–6, 4–6
Win	2–1	Feb 2004	ITF Columbus, United States	25,000	Hard (i)	(China) Peng Shuai	7–6^{(7–5)}, 7–5

== WTA Tour career earnings ==
Vaidišová earned more than 2M during her career.

Year	Grand Slam singles titles	WTA singles titles	Total singles titles	Earnings ($)	Money list rank
2003	0	0	0	1,568	879
2004	0	2	2	87,753	130
2005	0	3	3	391,316	32
2006	0	1	1	737,913	15
2007	0	0	0	875,623	13
2008	0	0	0	509,762	33
2009	0	0	0	n/a	100+
2010	0	0	0	n/a	100+
Career	0	6	6	2,778,619	215

== Head-to-head record ==
=== Record against top 10 players ===
Vaidišová's record against players who have been ranked in the top 10. Active players are in boldface.

Reviewing request.

**Player**	**Record**	**Win%**	**Hard**	**Clay**	**Grass**	**Carpet**	**Last match**
Number 1 ranked players							
(Russia) Dinara Safina	2–0	100%	2–0	–	–	–	Won (6–3, 7–6^{(9–7)}) at 2007 Linz
**(Germany) Angelique Kerber**	1–0	100%	–	1–0	–	–	Won (3–6, 6–4, 6–4) at 2009 Marbella
**(Belarus) Victoria Azarenka**	2–1	67%	1–1	–	1–0	–	Won (6–4, 6–2) at 2007 Wimbledon
(Serbia) Jelena Janković	6–3	67%	5–2	1–1	–	–	Won (6–4, 4–6, 6–4) at 2008 Sydney
(France) Amélie Mauresmo	3–2	60%	0–2	1–0	1–0	1–0	Won (7–6^{(8–6)}, 4–6, 6–1) at 2007 Wimbledon
**(United States) Venus Williams**	1–1	50%	–	1–1	–	–	Won (6–7^{(5–7)}, 6–1, 6–3) at 2006 French Open
(Serbia) Ana Ivanovic	1–4	20%	1–3	–	0–1	–	Lost (1–6, 6–7^{(4–7)}) at 2015 Monterrey
(United States) Lindsay Davenport	0–1	0%	0–1	–	–	–	Lost (2–6, 4–6) at 2005 Australian Open
**(Romania) Simona Halep**	0–1	0%	0–1	–	–	–	Lost (4–6, 6–2, 1–6) at 2015 Miami
(Switzerland) Martina Hingis	0–1	0%	–	0–1	–	–	Lost (5–7, 3–6) at 2006 Rome
(Belgium) Kim Clijsters	0–2	0%	0–2	–	–	–	Lost (2–6, 6–7^{(0–7)}) at 2006 San Diego
(Belgium) Justine Henin	0–4	0%	0–3	–	0–1	–	Lost (6–3, 3–6, 5–7) at 2007 Zurich
**(United States) Serena Williams**	0–4	0%	0–4	–	–	–	Lost (3–6, 4–6) at 2008 Australian Open
Number 2 ranked players							
(Spain) Conchita Martínez	1–0	100%	1–0	–	–	–	Won (6–3, 6–0) at 2005 Bangkok
(Russia) Anastasia Myskina	1–0	100%	–	1–0	–	–	Won (6–3, 5–7, 6–4) at 2005 Charleston
**(Russia) Vera Zvonareva**	0–1	0%	–	–	0–1	–	Lost (3–6, 2–6) at 2005 Eastbourne
(China) Li Na	0–3	0%	0–2	–	0–1	–	Lost (3–6, 3–6) at 2008 Gold Coast
**(Russia) Svetlana Kuznetsova**	0–5	0%	0–3	0–1	0–1	–	Lost (1–6, 4–6) at 2009 Miami
Number 3 ranked players							
(Russia) Elena Dementieva	1–1	50%	1–0	–	–	0–1	Won (6–3, 6–3) at 2007 Australian Open
(Russia) Nadia Petrova	1–3	25%	1–2	–	0–1	–	Lost (1–6, 2–6) at 2006 Linz
(France) Mary Pierce	0–1	0%	0–1	–	–	–	Lost (4–6, 4–6) at 2005 Indian Wells
Number 4 ranked players							
(Australia) Samantha Stosur	6–0	100%	2–0	1–0	2–0	1–0	Won (6–2, 0–6, 4–6) at 2008 Wimbledon
(Italy) Francesca Schiavone	1–3	25%	0–1	0–2	–	1–0	Lost (2–6, 3–6) at 2009 Barcelona
(United Kingdom) Johanna Konta	0–1	0%	0–1	–	–	–	Lost (6–1, 1–6, 4–6) at 2014 Albuqueruque
Number 5 ranked players							
(Russia) Anna Chakvetadze	3–0	100%	2–0	–	1–0	–	Won (4–6, 7–6^{(7–0)}, 6–3) at 2008 Wimbledon
(Slovakia) Daniela Hantuchová	4–1	80%	4–1	–	–	–	Won (6–4, 6–2) at 2008 Sydney
(Czech Republic) Lucie Šafářová	3–2	60%	2–0	1–1	–	0–1	Lost (4–6, 2–6) at 2007 Paris
Number 6 ranked players							
(United States) Chanda Rubin	1–0	100%	1–0	–	–	–	Won (6–4, 6–3) at 2006 US Open
(Italy) Flavia Pennetta	3–1	75%	3–0	0–1	–	–	Won (4–6, 6–3, 7–6^{(7–4)}) at 2007 Linz
Number 7 ranked players							
(France) Marion Bartoli	2–0	100%	2–0	–	–	–	Won (4–6, 6–3, 6–2) at 2007 Indian Wells
(Italy) Roberta Vinci	1–1	50%	–	0–1	–	1–0	Lost (3–6, 3–6) at 2009 Marbella
(Switzerland) Patty Schnyder	0–1	0%	–	0–1	–	–	Lost (3–6, 2–6) at 2005 Charleston
Number 8 ranked players							
(Australia) Alicia Molik	1–0	100%	1–0	–	–	–	Won (6–2, 6–3) at 2008 Australian Open
(Russia) Ekaterina Makarova	1–1	50%	–	0–1	1–0	–	Won (6–7^{(5–7)}, 6–2, 6–4) at 2008 Birmingham
(Japan) Ai Sugiyama	1–2	33%	1–2	–	–	–	Lost (3–6, 6–3, 2–6) at 2008 Montréal
Number 9 ranked players							
(Switzerland) Timea Bacsinszky	1–0	100%	–	1–0	–	–	Won (6–3, 6–2) at 2006 Strasbourg
Number 10 ranked players							
(Russia) Maria Kirilenko	1–0	100%	1–0	–	–	–	Won (6–4, 6–2) at 2005 Tokyo
**Total**	**49–51**	**49%**	**31–32 (49%)**	**8–11 (42%)**	**6–6 (50%)**	**4–2 (67%)**	**last updated 9 April 2022**

=== No. 1 wins ===
#	Player	Event	Surface	Rd	Score	Result
1.	(France) Amélie Mauresmo	2006 French Open	Clay	4R	6–7^{(5–7)}, 6–1, 6–2	SF
2.	(France) Amélie Mauresmo	2006 Kremlin Cup, Russia	Carpet	QF	1–6, 7–5, 7–6^{(7–3)}	SF

=== Wins over top 10 players ===
**Season**	2005	2006	2007	2008	**Total**
Wins	2	2	3	3	**10**

#	Player	Rank	Event	Surface	Rd	Score	NVR
**2005**
1.	(Russia) Anastasia Myskina	No. 6	Charleston Open, US	Clay	2R	6–3, 5–7, 6–4	No. 49
2.	(Russia) Nadia Petrova	No. 9	Bangkok Open, Thailand	Hard	F	6–1, 6–7^{(5–7)}, 7–5	No. 18
**2006**
3.	(France) Amélie Mauresmo	**No. 1**	French Open	Clay	4R	6–7^{(5–7)}, 6–1, 6–2	No. 16
4.	(France) Amélie Mauresmo	**No. 1**	Kremlin Cup, Russia	Carpet	QF	1–6, 7–5, 7–6^{(7–3)}	No. 11
**2007**
5.	(Russia) Elena Dementieva	No. 8	Australian Open	Hard	4R	6–3, 6–3	No. 12
6.	(France) Amélie Mauresmo	No. 4	Wimbledon Championships, UK	Grass	4R	7–6^{(8–6)}, 4–6, 6–1	No. 10
7.	(Serbia) Jelena Janković	No. 3	Zurich Open, Switzerland	Hard	2R	6–4, 6–4	No. 15
**2008**
8.	(Slovakia) Daniela Hantuchová	No. 9	Sydney International, Australia	Hard	2R	6–4, 6–2	No. 12
9.	(Serbia) Jelena Janković	No. 3	Sydney International, Australia	Hard	QF	6–4, 4–6, 6–4	No. 12
10.	(Russia) Anna Chakvetadze	No. 8	Wimbledon Championships, UK	Grass	4R	4–6, 7–6^{(7–0)}, 6–3	No. 22

== Notes ==
Sporting positions
Preceded by (Russia) Vera Dushevina	Orange Bowl Girls' Singles Champion; Category: 18 and under 2003	Succeeded by (United States) Jessica Kirkland
