= Antonella Serra Zanetti =

Italian tennis player

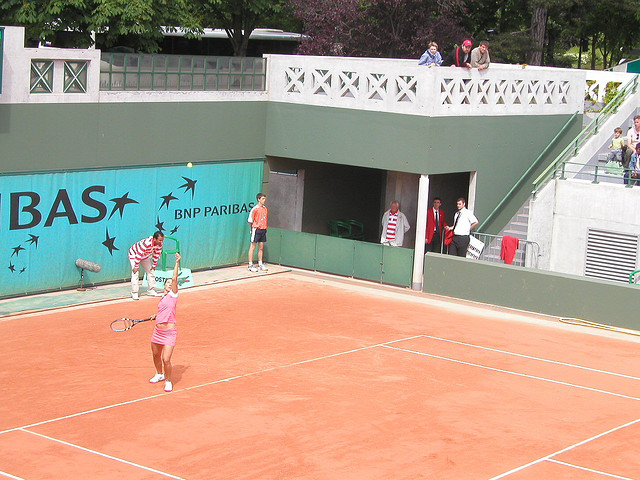
- Country (sports): Italy
- Born: 25 July 1980 (age 45) Modena
- Height: 1.68 m (5 ft 6 in)
- Turned pro: 1995
- Retired: 2009
- Plays: Right-handed (two-handed backhand)
- Prize money: $722,516

Singles
- Career record: 296–292
- Career titles: 0 WTA, 6 ITF
- Highest ranking: No. 60 (30 January 2006)

Grand Slam singles results
- Australian Open: 2R (2002, 2003, 2004)
- French Open: 2R (2005)
- Wimbledon: 3R (2005)
- US Open: 2R (2002, 2003, 2004)

Doubles
- Career record: 130–155
- Career titles: 2 WTA, 5 ITF
- Highest ranking: No. 47 (8 May 2006)

Grand Slam doubles results
- Australian Open: 3R (2006)
- French Open: 2R (2004)
- Wimbledon: 2R (2005)
- US Open: 2R (2005)

Team competitions
- Fed Cup: 1–3

Antonella Serra Zanetti (born 25 July 1980; Italian pronunciation: [antoˈnɛlla ˈsɛrra ddzaˈnetti]) is a former professional tennis player from Italy.

On 30 January 2006, Serra Zanetti achieved her career-high singles ranking of world No. 60. On 8 May 2006, she peaked at No. 47 in the doubles rankings. In her career, she won two doubles titles on WTA Tour, as well as six singles and five doubles titles on the ITF Women's Circuit.

== Personal ==
Antonella was coached by Patricio Remondegui, her favorite surface is hardcourt. Father Alessandro is in banking; mother Arianna is an art history teacher; older brother Andrea and younger sister Alessia are students. Older sister Adriana also retired as professional tennis player.

Antonella Serra Zanetti retired from the professional tour 2009.

== WTA Tour finals ==
=== Singles: 1 (runner-up) ===
Winner — Legend
Grand Slam tournaments
Tier I (0–0)
Tier II (0–0)
Tier III, IV & V (0–1)

Result	No.	Date	Tournament	Surface	Opponent	Score
Loss	1.	Mar 2003	Casablanca, Morocco	Clay	(Italy) Rita Grande	2–6, 6–4, 1–6

=== Doubles: 2 (2 titles) ===
Winner — Legend
Grand Slam tournaments
Tier I (0–0)
Tier II (0–0)
Tier III, IV & V (2–0)

Result	No.	Date	Tournament	Surface	Partner	Opponents	Score
Win	1.	Oct 2004	Tashkent Open, Uzbekistan	Hard	(Italy) Adriana Serra Zanetti	(France) Marion Bartoli (Italy) Mara Santangelo	1–6, 6–3, 6–4
Win	2.	May 2005	İstanbul Cup, Turkey	Clay	(Spain) Marta Marrero	(Austria) Daniela Klemenschits (Austria) Sandra Klemenschits	6–4, 6–0

== ITF finals ==
$75,000 tournaments
$50,000 tournaments
$25,000 tournaments
$10,000 tournaments

=== Singles (6–3) ===
Result	No.	Date	Location	Surface	Opponents	Score
Win	1.	28 April 1996	Bari, Italy	Clay	(Czech Republic) Jana Macurová	3–6, 6–2, 7–5
Win	2.	17 June 1996	Camucia, Italy	Clay	(France) Ségolène Berger	6–2, 7–6
Win	3.	3 August 1997	Catania, Italy	Clay	(Italy) Giulia Casoni	6–7^{(3)}, 6–3, 6–3
Win	4.	10 August 1997	Catania, Italy	Clay	(Australia) Mireille Dittmann	2–6, 6–4, 6–4
Loss	5.	25 October 1998	Montevideo, Uruguay	Clay	(Argentina) Paola Suárez	5–7, 4–6
Win	6.	5 June 2000	Galatina, Italy	Clay	(Slovakia) Martina Suchá	7–5, 1–6, 6–3
Win	7.	17 September 2000	Reggio Emilia, Italy	Clay	(Italy) Maria Elena Camerin	6–4, 6–4
Loss	8.	15 October 2000	Welwyn, United Kingdom	Hard	(United Kingdom) Lucie Ahl	2–4, 2–4, 1–4
Loss	9.	11 June 2001	Grado, Italy	Clay	(Italy) Valentina Sassi	3–6, 5–7

=== Doubles (5–10) ===
Result	No.	Date	Location	Surface	Partner	Opponents	Score
Loss	1.	9 June 1997	Camucia, Italy	Hard	(Italy) Maria Paola Zavagli	(Italy) Cristina Salvi (Romania) Andreea Ehritt-Vanc	4–6, 1–6
Win	2.	13 September 1998	Edinburgh, UK	Clay	(Italy) Francesca Schiavone	(United Kingdom) Louise Latimer (United Kingdom) Helen Reesby	6–3, 6–3
Loss	3.	18 October 1998	São Paulo, Brazil	Clay	(Italy) Alice Canepa	(Netherlands) Seda Noorlander (Greece) Christína Papadáki	3–6, 7–6^{(4)}, 6–7^{(4)}
Loss	4.	15 November 1998	Suzano, Brazil	Clay	(Italy) Laura Dell'Angelo	(Slovakia) Andrea Šebová (Slovakia) Silvia Uríčková	6–3, 2–6, 4–6
Loss	5.	15 March 1999	Reims, France	Clay (i)	(Spain) Gisela Riera	(Slovakia) Janette Husárová (Hungary) Rita Kuti-Kis	2–6, 3–6
Win	6.	6 March 2000	Ortisei, Italy	Hard (i)	(Italy) Giulia Casoni	(Germany) Angelika Bachmann (Denmark) Eva Dyrberg	6–3, 4–6, 2–6
Loss	7.	20 March 2000	Taranto, Italy	Clay	(France) Stéphanie Foretz	(Spain) Eva Bes (Spain) Gisela Riera	7–6^{(2)}, 2–6, 2–6
Loss	8.	23 July 2000	Fontanafredda, Italy	Clay	(Slovenia) Maja Matevžič	(Spain) Rosa María Andrés Rodríguez (Spain) Conchita Martínez Granados	6–4, 2–6, 4–6
Loss	9.	9 October 2000	Welwyn, UK	Hard (i)	(Italy) Adriana Serra Zanetti	(New Zealand) Shelley Stephens (Serbia) Dragana Zarić	0–4, 3–5, 1–4
Loss	10.	30 April 2001	Taranto, Italy	Clay	(Italy) Roberta Vinci	(Spain) Eva Bes (Argentina) Eugenia Chialvo	2–6, 6–1, 3–6
Win	11.	28 July 2001	Civitanova, Italy	Clay	(Italy) Gloria Pizzichini	(Argentina) Gisela Dulko (United States) Edina Gallovits-Hall	6–3, 3–6, 6–1
Loss	12.	16 September 2001	Bordeaux, France	Clay	(Spain) Conchita Martínez Granados	(Serbia) Sandra Načuk (Serbia) Dragana Zarić	2–6, 6–7^{(6)}
Win	13.	14 September 2003	Denain, France	Clay	(Italy) Mara Santangelo	(Ukraine) Yuliya Beygelzimer (Belarus) Tatiana Poutchek	7–5, 6–3
Win	14.	18 February 2007	St. Paul, US	Hard (i)	(Sweden) Sofia Arvidsson	(Bosnia and Herzegovina) Mervana Jugić-Salkić (Turkey) İpek Şenoğlu	7–6^{(4)}, 5–7, 7–6^{(7)}
Loss	15.	19 February 2007	Clearwater, US	Hard	(Bosnia and Herzegovina) Mervana Jugić-Salkić	(Japan) Ryōko Fuda (Japan) Seiko Okamoto	7–5, 3–6, 4–6
