= 2008 Wimbledon Championships =

- Date: 23 June – 6 July
- Edition: 122nd
- Category: Grand Slam (ITF)
- Draw: 128S / 64D / 48XD
- Prize money: £11,812,000
- Surface: Grass
- Location: Church Road; SW19, Wimbledon, London, United Kingdom
- Venue: All England Lawn Tennis and Croquet Club
- Attendance: 475,812

Champions

Men's singles
- (Spain) Rafael Nadal

Women's singles
- (United States) Venus Williams

Men's doubles
- (Canada) Daniel Nestor / (Serbia) Nenad Zimonjić

Women's doubles
- (United States) Serena Williams / (United States) Venus Williams

Mixed doubles
- (United States) Bob Bryan / (Australia) Samantha Stosur

Wheelchair men's doubles
- (Netherlands) Robin Ammerlaan / (Netherlands) Ronald Vink

Boys' singles
- (Bulgaria) Grigor Dimitrov

Girls' singles
- (United Kingdom) Laura Robson

Boys' doubles
- (Chinese Taipei) Hsieh Cheng-peng / (Chinese Taipei) Yang Tsung-hua

Girls' doubles
- (Slovenia) Polona Hercog / (Australia) Jessica Moore

Gentlemen's invitation doubles
- (United States) Donald Johnson / (United States) Jared Palmer

Ladies' invitation doubles
- (Czech Republic) Jana Novotná / (United States) Kathy Rinaldi

Senior gentlemen's invitation doubles
- (United States) Ken Flach / (United States) Robert Seguso
- Wimbledon Championships

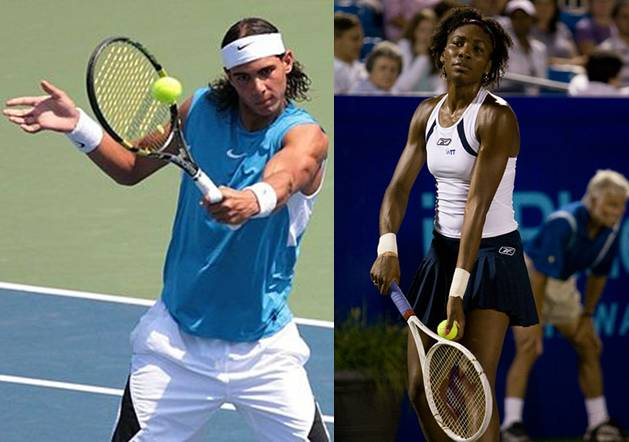
The two singles champions, Rafael Nadal and Venus Williams.

The 2008 Wimbledon Championships was a tennis tournament played on grass courts at the All England Lawn Tennis and Croquet Club in Wimbledon, London in the United Kingdom. It was the 122nd edition of Wimbledon and it was held from 23 June to 6 July 2008. It was the third tennis major of the year.

Spanish player Rafael Nadal won the first Wimbledon title of his career; it was the first Grand Slam tournament he won outside of the French Open. Nadal defeated five-time defending champion Roger Federer in the final in what many regard as the greatest tennis match of all time. In the women's singles, Venus Williams claimed her fifth title, and first win over her sister Serena in a Wimbledon final (she had lost the previous two). The performances of Britons Andy Murray in the men's singles and Laura Robson in the girls' singles were able to arouse significant interest from the home crowd.

Following the completion of the 2007 Championships, the new fixed roof was put in place at Centre Court, in time for the 2008 Championships. The retractable section of the new roof was completed for the 2009 Championships.

== Singles players ==
Men's singles

Champion		Runner-up	
(Spain) Rafael Nadal [2]		(Switzerland) Roger Federer [1]	
Semi-finals out
(Russia) Marat Safin		(Germany) Rainer Schüttler	
Quarter-finals out
(Croatia) Mario Ančić	(Spain) Feliciano López [31]	(France) Arnaud Clément	(United Kingdom) Andy Murray [12]
Fourth round out
(Australia) Lleyton Hewitt [20]	(Spain) Fernando Verdasco [22]	(Switzerland) Stan Wawrinka [13]	(Cyprus) Marcos Baghdatis [10]
(Serbia) Janko Tipsarević	(Croatia) Marin Čilić	(France) Richard Gasquet [8]	(Russia) Mikhail Youzhny [17]
Third round out
(France) Marc Gicquel	(Italy) Simone Bolelli	(Czech Republic) Tomáš Berdych [11]	(Spain) David Ferrer [5]
(Italy) Andreas Seppi [29]	(Germany) Mischa Zverev	(Germany) Simon Stadler (Q)	(United States) Bobby Reynolds
(Russia) Dmitry Tursunov [25]	(Spain) Guillermo García López	(France) Paul-Henri Mathieu [14]	(Austria) Jürgen Melzer
(France) Gilles Simon [28]	(Germany) Tommy Haas	(Czech Republic) Radek Štěpánek [16]	(Germany) Nicolas Kiefer [27]
Second round out
(Sweden) Robin Söderling	(Serbia) Ilija Bozoljac (LL)	(Spain) Albert Montañés	(Chile) Fernando González [15]
(Romania) Victor Hănescu	(Belgium) Olivier Rochus	(Germany) Philipp Petzschner (Q)	(Russia) Igor Andreev
(Serbia) Novak Djokovic [3]	(France) Florent Serra	(Spain) Juan Carlos Ferrero [21]	(Argentina) Juan Martín del Potro
(Sweden) Thomas Johansson	(Brazil) Thomaz Bellucci	(Croatia) Roko Karanušić	(Canada) Frank Dancevic
(United States) Andy Roddick [6]	(United Kingdom) Chris Eaton (Q)	(Spain) Nicolás Almagro [19]	(United States) James Blake [9]
(France) Jérémy Chardy (WC)	(Finland) Jarkko Nieminen [24]	(United States) Jesse Levine (Q)	(Germany) Benjamin Becker
(France) Sébastien Grosjean	(Argentina) Agustín Calleri	(Spain) Tommy Robredo [23]	(Belgium) Xavier Malisse (WC)
(Serbia) Viktor Troicki	(Italy) Stefano Galvani (Q)	(Argentina) Martín Vassallo Argüello	(Latvia) Ernests Gulbis
First round out
(Slovakia) Dominik Hrbatý (PR)	(United States) Kevin Kim (Q)	(Japan) Kei Nishikori	(Australia) Chris Guccione
(Netherlands) Robin Haase	(Argentina) Carlos Berlocq	(United Kingdom) Alex Bogdanovic (WC)	(United States) Robby Ginepri
(Russia) Evgeny Korolev	(Colombia) Alejandro Falla	(Israel) Dudi Sela	(Germany) Philipp Kohlschreiber
(France) Michaël Llodra [32]	(South Korea) Lee Hyung-taik	(Czech Republic) Jiří Vaněk	(Ukraine) Sergiy Stakhovsky (Q)
(Germany) Michael Berrer	(Italy) Fabio Fognini	(Chinese Taipei) Lu Yen-hsun	(Germany) Tobias Kamke (LL)
(United States) Sam Querrey	(Austria) Alexander Peya (Q)	(Czech Republic) Pavel Šnobel (Q)	(Brazil) Marcos Daniel
(Belgium) Steve Darcis	(United States) Vince Spadea	(Russia) Igor Kunitsyn	(Croatia) Ivo Karlović [18]
(Argentina) Brian Dabul	(Peru) Luis Horna	(Italy) Filippo Volandri	(Argentina) David Nalbandian [7]
(Argentina) Eduardo Schwank	(France) Thierry Ascione	(Serbia) Boris Pašanski	(France) Nicolas Mahut
(Spain) Marcel Granollers	(South Africa) Izak van der Merwe (Q)	(Spain) Santiago Ventura Bertomeu	(Belgium) Christophe Rochus (Q)
(Spain) Óscar Hernández	(Portugal) Frederico Gil (Q)	(France) Édouard Roger-Vasselin (Q)	(United States) Wayne Odesnik
(Croatia) Ivan Ljubičić [26]	(United States) Donald Young	(Sweden) Jonas Björkman	(Russia) Nikolay Davydenko [4]
(United States) Mardy Fish	(Italy) Potito Starace	(South Africa) Kevin Anderson	(Poland) Dawid Olejniczak (Q)
(Belgium) Kristof Vliegen	(Argentina) Guillermo Cañas	(Germany) Denis Gremelmayr	(France) Fabrice Santoro
(Czech Republic) Jan Hernych (Q)	(Ecuador) Nicolás Lapentti	(United Kingdom) Jamie Baker (WC)	(Argentina) Sergio Roitman
(France) Julien Benneteau	(Czech Republic) Ivo Minář	(United States) John Isner	(Germany) Andreas Beck (Q)

Women's singles

Champion		Runner-up	
(United States) Venus Williams [7]		(United States) Serena Williams [6]	
Semi-finals out
(China) Zheng Jie (WC)		(Russia) Elena Dementieva [5]	
Quarter-finals out
(Czech Republic) Nicole Vaidišová [18]	(Poland) Agnieszka Radwańska [14]	(Russia) Nadia Petrova [21]	(Thailand) Tamarine Tanasugarn
Fourth round out
(Hungary) Ágnes Szávay [15]	(Russia) Anna Chakvetadze [8]	(Russia) Svetlana Kuznetsova [4]	(United States) Bethanie Mattek
(Israel) Shahar Pe'er [24]	(Russia) Alla Kudryavtseva	(Russia) Alisa Kleybanova	(Serbia) Jelena Janković [2]
Third round out
(Serbia) Ana Ivanovic [1]	(Spain) Anabel Medina Garrigues	(Australia) Casey Dellacqua	(Russia) Evgeniya Rodina
(Czech Republic) Barbora Záhlavová-Strýcová (Q)	(Russia) Anastasia Pavlyuchenkova (Q)	(France) Marion Bartoli [11]	(France) Amélie Mauresmo [29]
(Argentina) Gisela Dulko	(Russia) Dinara Safina [9]	(Belarus) Victoria Azarenka [16]	(China) Peng Shuai
(Spain) María José Martínez Sánchez (Q)	(Japan) Ai Sugiyama	(New Zealand) Marina Erakovic	(Denmark) Caroline Wozniacki [31]
Second round out
(France) Nathalie Dechy	(United Kingdom) Elena Baltacha (WC)	(Italy) Francesca Schiavone [20]	(Romania) Monica Niculescu
(France) Pauline Parmentier	(Australia) Samantha Stosur (WC)	(Russia) Elena Vesnina	(Romania) Edina Gallovits
(Ukraine) Kateryna Bondarenko	(Ukraine) Alona Bondarenko [28]	(China) Li Na	(Poland) Marta Domachowska
(Ukraine) Tatiana Perebiynis	(Russia) Vera Dushevina	(Spain) Virginia Ruano Pascual	(Poland) Urszula Radwańska (WC)
(Switzerland) Timea Bacsinszky	(United States) Lindsay Davenport [25]	(France) Émilie Loit	(Chinese Taipei) Hsieh Su-wei
(Romania) Sorana Cîrstea	(Italy) Mara Santangelo	(Austria) Sybille Bammer [26]	(Russia) Maria Sharapova [3]
(United Kingdom) Anne Keothavong	(India) Sania Mirza [32]	(Italy) Flavia Pennetta [22]	(Slovakia) Daniela Hantuchová [10]
(Russia) Vera Zvonareva [13]	(Germany) Julia Görges	(Canada) Aleksandra Wozniak	(Spain) Carla Suárez Navarro (WC)
First round out
(Paraguay) Rossana de los Ríos	(China) Yuan Meng	(Germany) Angelique Kerber	(Slovakia) Dominika Cibulková
(Austria) Tamira Paszek	(China) Yan Zi	(Slovakia) Magdaléna Rybáriková (Q)	(Italy) Tathiana Garbin
(Switzerland) Patty Schnyder [12]	(Uzbekistan) Akgul Amanmuradova	(Romania) Raluca Olaru	(Czech Republic) Zuzana Ondrášková (Q)
(France) Virginie Razzano [27]	(Spain) Nuria Llagostera Vives	(Austria) Yvonne Meusburger	(Canada) Stéphanie Dubois
(France) Mathilde Johansson (Q)	(Japan) Rika Fujiwara (Q)	(France) Camille Pin	(United Kingdom) Melanie South (WC)
(France) Alizé Cornet [17]	(Australia) Anastasia Rodionova	(United States) Jill Craybas	(Czech Republic) Iveta Benešová
(Germany) Sabine Lisicki	(Czech Republic) Petra Kvitová	(France) Séverine Brémond (Q)	(Russia) Maria Kirilenko [19]
(United States) Ashley Harkleroad	(Venezuela) Milagros Sequera	(Czech Republic) Klára Zakopalová	(Estonia) Kaia Kanepi
(Italy) Maria Elena Camerin (Q)	(United States) Julie Ditty	(France) Aravane Rezaï	(Czech Republic) Renata Voráčová
(United Kingdom) Katie O'Brien (WC)	(Czech Republic) Lucie Šafářová	(France) Stéphanie Cohen-Aloro	(Chinese Taipei) Chan Yung-jan
(Bulgaria) Tsvetana Pironkova	(Russia) Ekaterina Bychkova	(Estonia) Maret Ani	(Belarus) Olga Govortsova
(Sweden) Sofia Arvidsson	(Ukraine) Viktoriya Kutuzova (Q)	(Russia) Ekaterina Makarova	(France) Stéphanie Foretz (Q)
(United Kingdom) Naomi Cavaday (WC)	(United States) Vania King	(Germany) Martina Müller	(Colombia) Catalina Castaño
(Ukraine) Julia Vakulenko	(Belgium) Yanina Wickmayer	(Israel) Tzipora Obziler	(Italy) Sara Errani
(Japan) Aiko Nakamura	(Czech Republic) Petra Cetkovská	(Netherlands) Michaëlla Krajicek	(Slovenia) Katarina Srebotnik [23]
(Czech Republic) Eva Hrdinová (Q)	(Ukraine) Mariya Koryttseva	(Russia) Galina Voskoboeva	(Ukraine) Olga Savchuk

== Point and prize money distribution ==
=== Point distribution ===
Below are the tables with the point distribution for each discipline of the tournament.

==== Senior points ====
Event	W	F	SF	QF	Round of 16	Round of 32	Round of 64	Round of 128	Q	Q3	Q2	Q1
Men's singles	1000	700	450	250	150	75	35	5	12	8	4	0
Men's doubles	1000	700	450	250	150	75	0	—N/a	12	—N/a	0	0
Women's singles	1000	700	450	250	140	90	60	2				
Women's doubles	1000	700	450	250	140	90	0	—N/a		—N/a	0	0

=== Prize distribution ===
The total prize money for 2008 championships was £11,812,000. The winner of the men's and women's singles title earned £750,000.

Event	W	F	SF	QF	Round of 16	Round of 32	Round of 64	Round of 128	Q3	Q2	Q1
Singles	£750,000	£375,000	£187,500	£93,750	£50,000	£28,125	£17,000	£10,250	£6,500	£3,250	£1,625
Doubles*	£230,000	£115,000	£57,500	£30,000	£16,000	£9,000	£5,250	—N/a	—N/a	—N/a	—N/a
Mixed doubles*	£92,000	£46,000	£23,000	£10,500	£5,200	£2,600	£1,300	—N/a	—N/a	—N/a	—N/a
Wheelchair doubles*	£6,750	£3,750	£2,250	£1,250	—N/a	—N/a	—N/a	—N/a	—N/a	—N/a	—N/a
Invitation doubles	£17,000	£14,000	£10,500	£9,500	£9,000	—N/a	—N/a	—N/a	—N/a	—N/a	—N/a

_{* per team}

== Champions ==
=== Seniors ===
==== Men's singles ====
(Spain) Rafael Nadal def. (Switzerland) Roger Federer, 6–4, 6–4, 6–7^{(5–7)}, 6–7^{(8–10)}, 9–7

- It was Rafael Nadal's sixth title of the year, and his 29th overall. It was his second Grand Slam title of the year, his fifth overall, and his first Wimbledon title.

==== Women's singles ====
(United States) Venus Williams def. (United States) Serena Williams, 7–5, 6–4

- It was Venus Williams's first title of the year, and her 37th overall. It was her seventh Grand Slam title, her fifth Wimbledon win, and her second consecutive win at the event.

==== Men's doubles ====
(Canada) Daniel Nestor / (Serbia) Nenad Zimonjić def. (Sweden) Jonas Björkman / (Zimbabwe) Kevin Ullyett, 7–6^{(14–12)}, 6–7^{(3–7)}, 6–3, 6–3

==== Women's doubles ====
(United States) Serena Williams / (United States) Venus Williams def. (United States) Lisa Raymond / (Australia) Samantha Stosur, 6–2, 6–2

==== Mixed doubles ====
(United States) Bob Bryan / (Australia) Samantha Stosur def. (United States) Mike Bryan / (Slovenia) Katarina Srebotnik, 7–5, 6–4

=== Juniors ===
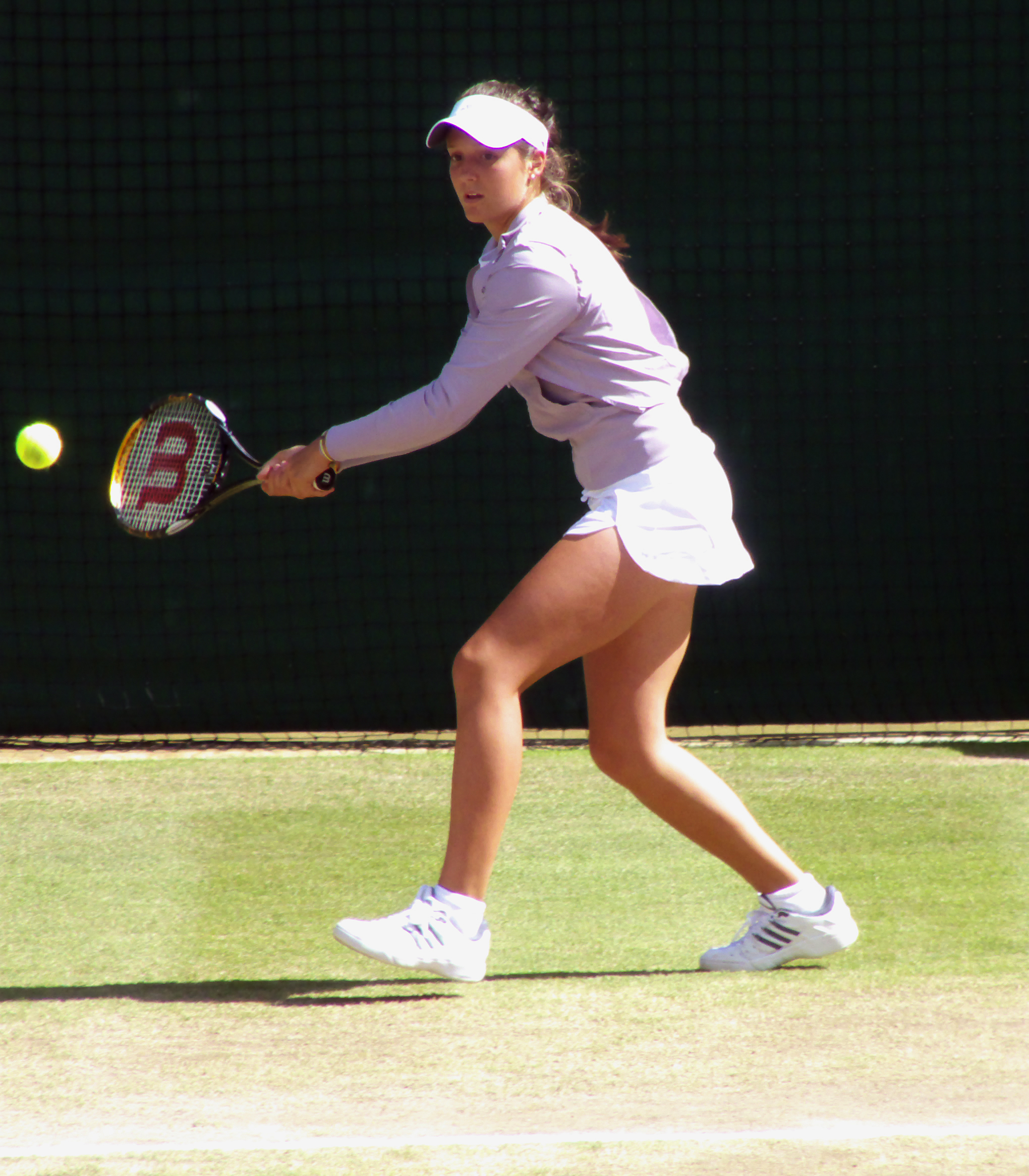
Girls' singles champion Laura Robson practicing.

==== Boys' singles ====
(Bulgaria) Grigor Dimitrov def. (Finland) Henri Kontinen, 7–5, 6–3

==== Girls' singles ====
(United Kingdom) Laura Robson def. (Thailand) Noppawan Lertcheewakarn, 6–3, 3–6, 6–1

==== Boys' doubles ====
(Chinese Taipei) Hsieh Cheng-peng / (Chinese Taipei) Yang Tsung-hua def. (Australia) Matt Reid / (Australia) Bernard Tomic, 6–4, 2–6, 12–10

==== Girls' doubles ====
(Slovenia) Polona Hercog / (Australia) Jessica Moore def. (Australia) Isabella Holland / (Australia) Sally Peers, 6–3, 1–6, 6–2

=== Other events ===
==== Gentlemen's invitation doubles ====
(United States) Donald Johnson / (United States) Jared Palmer def. (Netherlands) Jacco Eltingh / (Netherlands) Paul Haarhuis, walkover

==== Ladies' invitation doubles ====
(Czech Republic) Jana Novotná / (United States) Kathy Rinaldi def. (United States) Martina Navratilova / (Czech Republic) Helena Suková, 5–7, 6–3, [10–5]

==== Senior gentlemen's invitation doubles ====
(United States) Ken Flach / (United States) Robert Seguso def. (United Kingdom) Jeremy Bates / (Sweden) Anders Järryd, 7–6^{(7–1)}, 6–7^{(5–7)}, [10–7]

==== Wheelchair men's doubles ====
(Netherlands) Robin Ammerlaan / (Netherlands) Ronald Vink def. (France) Stéphane Houdet / (France) Nicolas Peifer, 6–7^{(8–10)}, 6–1, 6–3

== Notable stories ==
=== Betting scandal ===
There were allegations in a dossier that several matches, including eight at Wimbledon, were under suspicion of being fixed by professional gambling syndicates after bookmakers noted unexpected spikes in betting patterns. The dossier, released on the Sunday prior to the first day of play, had been commissioned by the Association of Tennis Professionals (ATP), Women's Tennis Association (WTA), International Tennis Federation (ITF), and four Grand Slams earlier in the year, and was compiled by bookmakers. An official said, "If you look at a tournament, you might see one match for £23,000 [in betting turnover], one for £27,000, one for £36,000 and one for £4.5m. It doesn’t take a genius to work out that something is going on in the last one." Betting on Wimbledon matches was popular in 2007, with over £420m wagered on bets.

To help deal with any potential gambling problems, the All England Club restricted access to players' changing rooms this year, allowing only the player and their coach permission. It was hoped that this would make communication between gamblers and players more difficult. Match fixing became a prominent issue in the media after the 2007 Orange Prokom Open, where the then World No. 4 Nikolay Davydenko came under suspicion of colluding with gamblers, and gambling company Betfair took the unprecedented step of voiding all bets on a match of his with Martín Vassallo Argüello.

=== Pigeon killing controversy ===
The All England Lawn Tennis and Croquet Club, the sport club that plays host to the Championships, came under fire from animal activists for using marksmen to shoot down dive-bombing pigeons. The marksmen were ordered to use hawks to scare them away, but when some failed to do so, the marksmen killed them, which led to the People for the Ethical Treatment of Animals (PETA) group releasing a statement admonishing the practice and subsequently, referring to the Animal Welfare Act 2006, contacting the Metropolitan Police.

Several players complained about the pigeons distracting them during play, and because of the inefficient nature of the hawks, rapid action was sought on the Sunday evening before the tournament began. The marksmen were hired by the All England Club and, armed with rifles, shot several birds. When the media broke the story on Monday, a spokesman for the All England Club defended the club's approach, saying that, "The hawks are our first line of deterrent, and by and large they do the job. But unfortunately there were one or two areas where the hawks didn't deter the pigeons, so it was deemed necessary to take a harder approach." By Tuesday however, the Metropolitan Police wildlife crime unit had been alerted to the practice by PETA, after allegedly infringing the Animal Welfare Act 2006. Bruce Friedrich, vice-president of PETA, wrote in a letter to the All England Club chairman Tim Phillips, that the birds did not represent "a demonstrable risk to public health and safety", and the activity was therefore in violation of the Act. A Wimbledon spokesperson subsequently announced that they had reneged on their policy, and that the All England Club would no longer shoot pigeons.

A similar, but more inconspicuous, incident also occurred on the Sunday evening before the Championships. A swarm of bees descended upon the area surrounding the All England Club; this caused the clearing out of the players' lawn (where competitors gather after play) and a temporary cessation of some interviews. Further disruption was caused because organizers had to alter the overnight queuing system, in order to protect people. This was the first time that bees had caused disruptions at the All England Club. Some media outlets reported that the bees deserted the grounds after around 90 minutes, whilst others claimed that a similar resolution to the pigeon problem was sought, with the bees being professionally exterminated.

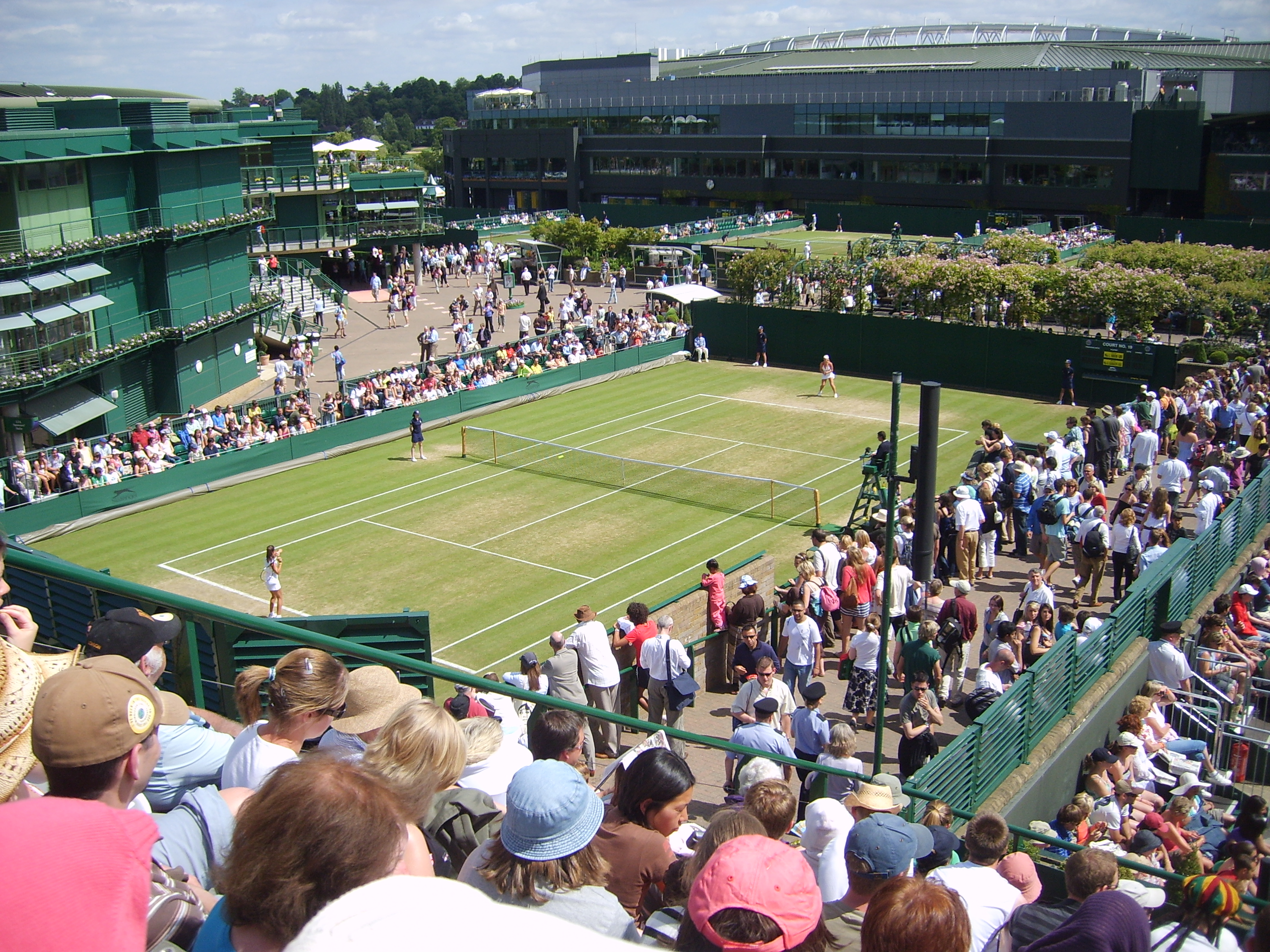
Laura Robson (left), in her first round juniors match against Alexa Guarachi

=== British performance ===
The British public were treated to some palpable success, as London-based Laura Robson became the first British girl to win the Girls' juniors competition since Annabel Croft in 1984. Fourteen-year-old Robson, the youngest player in the Girls' juniors, had to beat players aged up to eighteen, the maximum age allowed for entry into the juniors. She garnered considerable media attention; with a large crowd gathered to watch both her semi-final and final matches, the latter of which was on No. 1 Court, she called it an "overwhelming experience." British-based gambling company Ladbrokes slashed her odds of winning Wimbledon before 2020 from 50/1 to 20/1.

In the seniors, 2007 mixed doubles champion Jamie Murray could not replicate his triumph of the previous year with new partner Liezel Huber, after his 2007 partner Jelena Janković opted not to play in order to concentrate on the singles competition. Murray and Huber reached the semi-finals where they were knocked out by Bob Bryan and Samantha Stosur.

In the seniors singles competition, the most significant impact was made by Scottish player Andy Murray, when he became the first British player to reach the quarter-finals since Tim Henman in 2004. Murray, often castigated in the British media for his surly manner, won the crowd's affections with his five-set victory over Richard Gasquet (details of this match are given in the Day 7 summary). The Murray–Gasquet match was watched by over 10 million people in the UK, and it was watched by more than 50% of the potential viewing public in his native Scotland.

Chris Eaton from Surrey, the ATP No. 661, successfully began his campaign in qualifying, and then caused a major surprise by beating ATP No. 114 Boris Pašanski in the first round. Anne Keothavong was the first British woman to directly qualify to the main draw since 1998, however no British woman made it beyond the second round.

=== A tournament of upsets and surprises ===
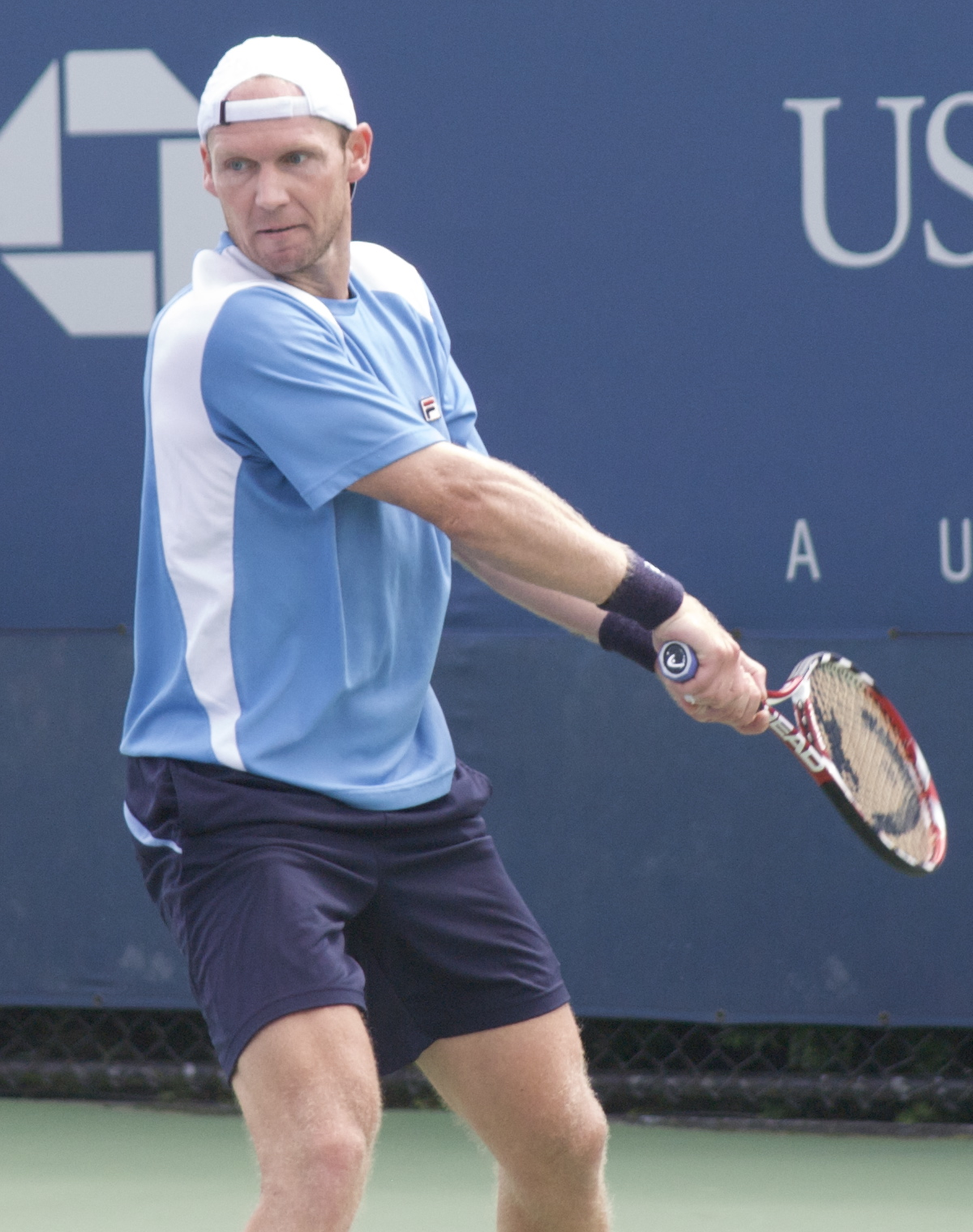
Rainer Schüttler reached his first Wimbledon semi-final

The men's side of the draw was notable for the performances of Marat Safin and Rainer Schüttler, ranked 75th and 94th respectively on entering the tournament. Safin caused an upset in the second round when he defeated Australian Open champion Novak Djokovic in straight sets, on the way to his first ever Wimbledon semi-final, where he lost to Roger Federer. After more than five years without reaching the quarter-finals of a Grand Slam tournament, and thirteen consecutive Grand Slam tournaments without advancing past the second round, Schüttler also reached his first Wimbledon semi-final, where he was defeated in straight sets by the eventual champion Rafael Nadal. Schüttler had earlier defeated Arnaud Clément (who had previously not advanced to the quarter-finals of a Grand Slam tournament since reaching the final of the 2001 Australian Open) in an epic quarter-final that lasted two days.

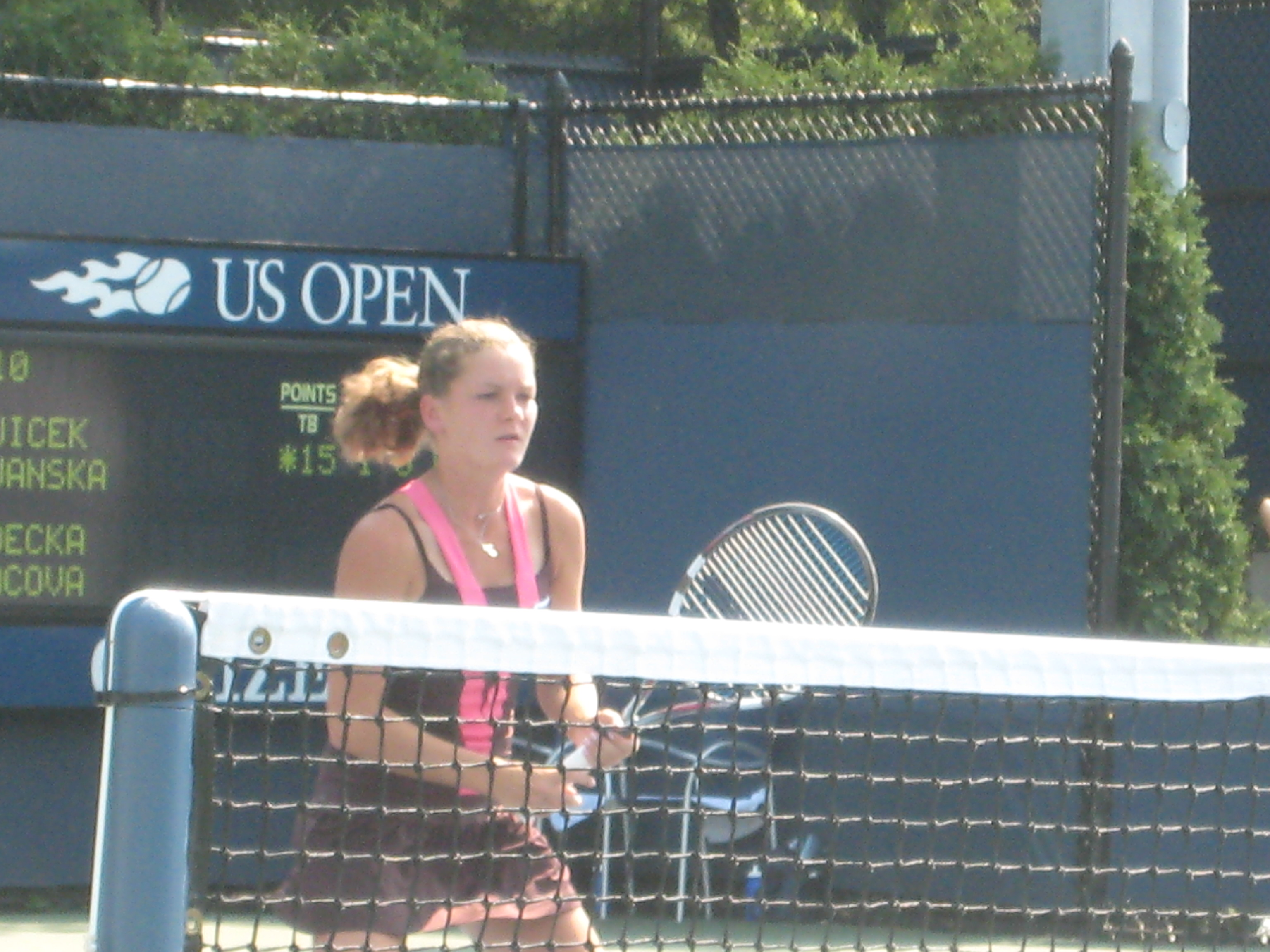
Agnieszka Radwańska reached her first Wimbledon quarter-final by defeating Svetlana Kuznetsova in the fourth round

The women's side of the draw saw some of the biggest upsets in the tournament's history, in which the top four seeds—Ana Ivanovic, Jelena Janković, Maria Sharapova and Svetlana Kuznetsova—all failed to reach the quarter-finals. Maria Sharapova suffered her earliest exit at Wimbledon when she lost to Alla Kudryavtseva in the second round; this was also her earliest exit at a Grand Slam since the 2003 US Open. Recent French Open champion and newly crowned World No. 1 Ana Ivanovic was stunned in the third round by Chinese wild card entrant and World No. 133 Zheng Jie. This was the earliest exit by a top seed at Wimbledon since Martina Hingis lost in the first round in 2001, and Zheng Jie also became the lowest-ranked player ever to defeat a top seed at the tournament. Janković and Kuznetsova were both toppled in the fourth round by Tamarine Tanasugarn and Agnieszka Radwańska, respectively. This was the first time since seedings began at Wimbledon in 1927 (and the first time in the Open Era) that none of the top four seeds managed to advance past the fourth round. Zheng Jie became the second Chinese player (after Li Na in 2006) to reach the quarter-finals at Wimbledon, and the first wild card entry ever to reach the semi-finals (a feat later achieved by Sabine Lisicki in 2011), where she was defeated by eventual runner-up Serena Williams. Meanwhile, Tanasugarn reached her first Grand Slam quarter-final by virtue of her victory over Janković, losing to the eventual champion Venus Williams.

== Singles seeds ==
The following are the seeded players and notable players who withdrew from the event. Seedings based on ATP and WTA rankings as of 16 June 2008. Rankings and points before are as of 23 June 2008.

=== Men's singles ===
The Men's singles seeds is arranged on a surface-based system to reflect more accurately the individual player's grass court achievement as per the following formula:

- ESP points as at a week before The Championships at 16 June 2008
- Add 100% points earned for all grass court tournaments in the past 12 months (18 June 2007 – 15 June 2008)
- add 75% points earned for best grass court tournament in the 12 months before that (19 June 2006 – 17 June 2007).

Seed	Rank	Player	Points before	Points defending	Points won	Points after	Status
1	1	(Switzerland) Roger Federer	6,900	1,000	700	6,600	Runner-up, lost to (Spain) Rafael Nadal [2]
2	2	(Spain) Rafael Nadal	5,755	700	1,000	6,055	Champion, defeated (Switzerland) Roger Federer [1]
3	3	(Serbia) Novak Djokovic	5,360	450	35	4,945	Second round lost to (Russia) Marat Safin
4	4	(Russia) Nikolay Davydenko	3,115	150	5	2,970	First round lost to (Germany) Benjamin Becker
5	5	(Spain) David Ferrer	3,005	35	75	3,045	Third round lost to (Croatia) Mario Ančić
6	6	(United States) Andy Roddick	2,280	250	35	2,065	Second round lost to (Serbia) Janko Tipsarević
7	7	(Argentina) David Nalbandian	2,100	75	5	2,030	First round lost to (Canada) Frank Dancevic
8	10	(France) Richard Gasquet	1,610	450	150	1,310	Fourth round lost to (United Kingdom) Andy Murray [12]
9	8	(United States) James Blake	2,015	75	35	1,975	Second round lost to (Germany) Rainer Schüttler
10	25	(Cyprus) Marcos Baghdatis	1,090	250	150	990	Fourth round lost to (Spain) Feliciano López [31]
11	20	(Czech Republic) Tomáš Berdych	1,290	450	75	915	Third round lost to (Spain) Fernando Verdasco [22]
12	11	(United Kingdom) Andy Murray	1,555	0	250	1,805	Quarter-finals lost to (Spain) Rafael Nadal [2]
13	9	(Switzerland) Stan Wawrinka	1,615	5	150	1,760	Fourth round lost to (Russia) Marat Safin
14	16	(France) Paul-Henri Mathieu	1,345	150	75	1,270	Third round lost to (Croatia) Marin Čilić
15	14	(Chile) Fernando González	1,405	75	35	1,365	Second round lost to (Italy) Simone Bolelli
16	15	(Czech Republic) Radek Štěpánek	1,360	5	75	1,430	Third round lost to (Russia) Mikhail Youzhny [17]
17	17	(Russia) Mikhail Youzhny	1,305	150	150	1,305	Fourth round lost to (Spain) Rafael Nadal [2]
18	22	(Croatia) Ivo Karlović	1,220	5	5	1,220	First round lost to (Germany) Simon Stadler [Q]
19	12	(Spain) Nicolás Almagro	1,485	5	35	1,515	Second round lost to (Spain) Guillermo García López
20	27	(Australia) Lleyton Hewitt	1,050	150	150	1,050	Fourth round lost to (Switzerland) Roger Federer [1]
21	23	(Spain) Juan Carlos Ferrero	1,135	250	35	920	Second round retired against (Germany) Mischa Zverev
22	18	(Spain) Fernando Verdasco	1,300	75	150	1,375	Fourth round lost to (Croatia) Mario Ančić
23	19	(Spain) Tommy Robredo	1,300	35	35	1,300	Second round lost to (Germany) Tommy Haas
24	28	(Finland) Jarkko Nieminen	1,050	75	35	1,010	Second round lost to (Croatia) Marin Čilić
25	33	(Russia) Dmitry Tursunov	968	75	75	968	Third round lost to (Serbia) Janko Tipsarević
26	31	(Croatia) Ivan Ljubičić	980	75	5	910	First round lost to (Austria) Jürgen Melzer
27	32	(Germany) Nicolas Kiefer	970	75	75	970	Third round lost to (Spain) Rafael Nadal [2]
28	29	(France) Gilles Simon	1,030	35	75	1,070	Third round lost to (France) Richard Gasquet [8]
29	30	(Italy) Andreas Seppi	1,015	35	35	1,015	Third round lost to (Russia) Marat Safin
~~30~~	~~26~~	~~(France) Gaël Monfils~~	1,053	75	0	978	Withdrew due to shoulder injury
31	35	(Spain) Feliciano López	950	75	250	1,125	Quarter-finals lost to (Russia) Marat Safin
32	34	(France) Michaël Llodra	951	35	5	921	First round lost to (Croatia) Mario Ančić

The following players would have been seeded, but they withdrew from the event.

Rank	Player	Points before	Points defending	Points after	Withdrawal reason
13	(France) Jo-Wilfried Tsonga	1,415	150	1,265	Knee injury
21	(Argentina) Juan Mónaco	1,245	5	1,240	Back injury
24	(Spain) Carlos Moyá	1,095	5	1,090	Shoulder injury

=== Women's singles ===
Seed	Rank	Player	Points before	Points defending	Points won	Points after	Status
1	1	(Serbia) Ana Ivanovic	4,188	450	90	3,828	Third round lost to (China) Zheng Jie [WC]
2	3	(Serbia) Jelena Janković	3,685	140	140	3,685	Fourth round lost to (Thailand) Tamarine Tanasugarn
3	2	(Russia) Maria Sharapova	3,706	140	60	3,646	Second round lost to (Russia) Alla Kudryavtseva
4	4	(Russia) Svetlana Kuznetsova	3,565	450	140	3,255	Fourth round lost to (Poland) Agnieszka Radwańska [14]
5	5	(Russia) Elena Dementieva	2,745	90	450	3,105	Semi-finals lost to (United States) Venus Williams [7]
6	6	(United States) Serena Williams	2,676	250	700	3,126	Runner-up, lost to (United States) Venus Williams [7]
7	7	(United States) Venus Williams	2,606	1,000	1,000	2,606	Champion, defeated (United States) Serena Williams [6]
8	8	(Russia) Anna Chakvetadze	2,436	90	140	2,486	Fourth round lost to (Czech Republic) Nicole Vaidišová [18]
9	9	(Russia) Dinara Safina	2,257	60	90	2,287	Third round lost to (Israel) Shahar Pe'er [24]
10	12	(Slovakia) Daniela Hantuchová	2,007	140	60	1,927	Second round lost to (Russia) Alisa Kleybanova
11	10	(France) Marion Bartoli	2,030	700	90	1,420	Third round lost to (United States) Bethanie Mattek
12	13	(Switzerland) Patty Schnyder	1,940	140	2	1,802	First round lost to (Australia) Casey Dellacqua
13	14	(Russia) Vera Zvonareva	1,912	0	60	1,972	Second round lost to (Thailand) Tamarine Tanasugarn
14	11	(Poland) Agnieszka Radwańska	2,011	90	250	2,171	Quarter-finals lost to (United States) Serena Williams [6]
15	15	(Hungary) Ágnes Szávay	1,645	91	140	1,694	Fourth round lost to (China) Zheng Jie [WC]
16	16	(Belarus) Victoria Azarenka	1,386	90	90	1,386	Third round lost to (Russia) Nadia Petrova [21]
17	17	(Russia) Alizé Cornet	1,248	60	2	1,190	First round lost to (Russia) Anastasia Pavlyuchenkova [Q]
18	22	(Czech Republic) Nicole Vaidišová	1,153	250	250	1,153	Quarter-finals lost to (China) Zheng Jie [WC]
19	19	(Russia) Maria Kirilenko	1,208	2	2	1,208	First round lost to (Russia) Vera Dushevina
20	20	(Italy) Francesca Schiavone	1,201	60	60	1,201	Second round lost to (Spain) Anabel Medina Garrigues
21	18	(Russia) Nadia Petrova	1,211	140	250	1,321	Quarter-finals lost to (Russia) Elena Dementieva [5]
22	23	(Italy) Flavia Pennetta	1,122	2	60	1,180	Second round lost to (Japan) Ai Sugiyama
23	24	(Slovenia) Katarina Srebotnik	1,110	90	2	1,022	First round lost to (Germany) Julia Görges
24	26	(Israel) Shahar Pe'er	1,027	90	140	1,077	Fourth round lost to (Russia) Elena Dementieva [5]
25	25	(United States) Lindsay Davenport	1,055	0	60	1,115	Second round withdrew due to knee injury
26	29	(Austria) Sybille Bammer	977	60	60	977	Second round lost to (China) Peng Shuai
27	28	(France) Virginie Razzano	1,015	2	2	1,015	First round lost to (Russia) Evgeniya Rodina
28	27	(Ukraine) Alona Bondarenko	1,018	90	60	988	Second round retired against (Czech Republic) Barbora Záhlavová-Strýcová [Q]
29	33	(France) Amélie Mauresmo	832	140	90	782	Third round lost to (United States) Serena Williams [6]
30	31	(Slovakia) Dominika Cibulková	902	(20)^{†}	2	884	First round lost to (China) Zheng Jie [WC]
31	30	(Denmark) Caroline Wozniacki	932	60	90	962	Third round lost to (Serbia) Jelena Janković [2]
32	32	(India) Sania Mirza	867	60	60	867	Second round lost to (Spain) María José Martínez Sánchez [Q]

† The player did not qualify for the tournament in 2007. Accordingly, points for her 16th best result are deducted instead.

The following player would have been seeded, but she withdrew from the event.

Rank	Player	Points before	Points defending	Points after	Withdrawal reason
21	(France) Tatiana Golovin	1,160	60	1,100	Back injury

== Main draw wild card entries ==
The following players received wild cards into the main draw senior events.

Men's singles

1. (United Kingdom) Jamie Baker
2. (United Kingdom) Alex Bogdanovic
3. (France) Jérémy Chardy
4. (Belgium) Xavier Malisse

Women's singles

1. (United Kingdom) Elena Baltacha
2. (United Kingdom) Naomi Cavaday
3. (United Kingdom) Katie O'Brien
4. (Poland) Urszula Radwańska
5. (United Kingdom) Melanie South
6. (Spain) Carla Suárez Navarro
7. (Australia) Samantha Stosur
8. (China) Zheng Jie

Men's doubles

1. (United Kingdom) James Auckland / (United Kingdom) Jamie Delgado
2. (United Kingdom) Neil Bamford / (United Kingdom) Josh Goodall
3. (United Kingdom) Richard Bloomfield / (United Kingdom) Ken Skupski
4. (United Kingdom) Alex Bogdanovic / (United Kingdom) Jonathan Marray
5. (United Kingdom) Chris Eaton / (United Kingdom) Alexander Slabinsky

Women's doubles

1. (United Kingdom) Elena Baltacha / (United Kingdom) Naomi Cavaday
2. (United Kingdom) Amanda Elliott / (United Kingdom) Katie O'Brien
3. (United Kingdom) Anne Keothavong / (United Kingdom) Melanie South
4. (United Kingdom) Anna Fitzpatrick / (United Kingdom) Anna Hawkins
5. (United Kingdom) Sarah Borwell / (United Kingdom) Jocelyn Rae

Mixed doubles

1. (United Kingdom) James Auckland / (United Kingdom) Elena Baltacha
2. (United Kingdom) Alex Bogdanovic / (United Kingdom) Melanie South
3. (United Kingdom) Richard Bloomfield / (United Kingdom) Sarah Borwell
4. (United Kingdom) Jamie Delgado / (United Kingdom) Katie O'Brien
5. (United Kingdom) Ross Hutchins / (United Kingdom) Anne Keothavong

== Main draw qualifier entries ==
=== Men's singles ===
Men's singles qualifiers

1. (Germany) Andreas Beck
2. (Belgium) Christophe Rochus
3. (Portugal) Frederico Gil
4. (Germany) Philipp Petzschner
5. (United States) Kevin Kim
6. (France) Édouard Roger-Vasselin
7. (South Africa) Izak van der Merwe
8. (United States) Jesse Levine
9. (Czech Republic) Pavel Šnobel
10. (Italy) Stefano Galvani
11. (Austria) Alexander Peya
12. (Czech Republic) Jan Hernych
13. (Ukraine) Sergiy Stakhovsky
14. (Germany) Simon Stadler
15. (United Kingdom) Chris Eaton
16. (Poland) Dawid Olejniczak

Lucky losers

1. (Serbia) Ilija Bozoljac
2. (Germany) Tobias Kamke

=== Women's singles ===
Women's singles qualifiers

1. (Russia) Anastasia Pavlyuchenkova
2. (Czech Republic) Zuzana Ondrášková
3. (Czech Republic) Barbora Záhlavová-Strýcová
4. (France) Séverine Brémond
5. (Spain) María José Martínez Sánchez
6. (Ukraine) Viktoriya Kutuzova
7. (Italy) Maria Elena Camerin
8. (France) Stéphanie Foretz
9. (Slovakia) Magdaléna Rybáriková
10. (Japan) Rika Fujiwara
11. (Czech Republic) Eva Hrdinová
12. (France) Mathilde Johansson

=== Men's doubles ===
Men's doubles qualifiers

1. (United States) Amer Delić / (United States) Brendan Evans
2. (Portugal) Frederico Gil / (Belgium) Dick Norman
3. (United States) K. J. Hippensteel / (United States) Tripp Phillips
4. (Czech Republic) Petr Pála / (Slovakia) Igor Zelenay

Lucky losers

1. (Sweden) Johan Brunström / (Australia) Adam Feeney
2. (Russia) Mikhail Elgin / (Russia) Alexander Kudryavtsev
3. (United States) Hugo Armando / (United States) Jesse Levine

=== Women's doubles ===
Women's doubles qualifiers

1. (Russia) Maria Kirilenko / (Italy) Flavia Pennetta
2. (United States) Raquel Kops-Jones / (United States) Abigail Spears
3. (Argentina) Jorgelina Cravero / (Argentina) Betina Jozami
4. (Czech Republic) Andrea Hlaváčková / (Ukraine) Olga Savchuk

Lucky losers

1. (United States) Christina Fusano / (United States) Angela Haynes
2. (Japan) Ayumi Morita / (Japan) Junri Namigata
3. (United Kingdom) Anna Smith / (United Kingdom) Georgie Stoop

== Withdrawals ==
The following players were accepted directly into the main tournament, but withdrew with injuries, suspensions or personal reasons.

Men's singles

- (Argentina) José Acasuso → replaced by (Germany) Tobias Kamke
- (Argentina) Juan Ignacio Chela → replaced by (Argentina) Brian Dabul
- (Austria) Stefan Koubek → replaced by (Colombia) Alejandro Falla
- (Germany) Florian Mayer → replaced by (Serbia) Boris Pašanski
- (Argentina) Juan Mónaco → replaced by (Croatia) Roko Karanušić
- (France) Gaël Monfils → replaced by (Serbia) Ilija Bozoljac
- (Spain) Carlos Moyá → replaced by (Argentina) Martín Vassallo Argüello
- (France) Jo-Wilfried Tsonga → replaced by (United States) Wayne Odesnik

Women's singles

- (Greece) Eleni Daniilidou → replaced by (Canada) Aleksandra Wozniak
- (France) Tatiana Golovin → replaced by (Venezuela) Milagros Sequera
- (Italy) Karin Knapp → replaced by (Romania) Monica Niculescu
- (Japan) Akiko Morigami → replaced by (Czech Republic) Renata Voráčová
- (Argentina) María Emilia Salerni → replaced by (Germany) Julia Görges
- (United States) Meghann Shaughnessy → replaced by (United States) Bethanie Mattek
- (United States) Meilen Tu → replaced by (United States) Vania King

Preceded by 2008 French Open	Grand Slams	Succeeded by 2008 US Open
