= 2008 Wimbledon Championships – Day-by-day summaries =

The 2008 Wimbledon Championships are described below in detail, in the form of day-by-day summaries.

== Day 1 ==
The first day of the competition saw World No. 1 and five-time Wimbledon winner Roger Federer breeze by his opponent to reach the second round, alongside Marcos Baghdatis, Fernando González, Feliciano López, Andreas Seppi, Juan Carlos Ferrero, Novak Djokovic, Stan Wawrinka, Fernando Verdasco and David Ferrer. 2007 Wimbledon quarterfinalist Tomáš Berdych was pushed in a five-setter by ATP No. 78 Evgeny Korolev, but eventually prevailed on the final score of 4–6, 6–1, 6–4, 3–6, 7–5, after three hours of play, while former World No. 1 and 2002 Wimbledon champion Lleyton Hewitt survived a close, three-hours-and-a-half-long five-setter against Robin Haase, winning 6–7(4), 6–3, 6–3, 6–7(1), 6–2. Recent French Open semifinalist Gaël Monfils was forced to withdraw before his first match due to a shoulder injury contracted during his Nottingham Open semifinal against Ivo Karlović. Karlović was himself upset later in the day by qualifier Simon Stadler, while thirty-second seed Michaël Llodra retired against Mario Ančić due to a left arm injury. Canadian wild card Frank Dancevic produced the biggest upset of the day knocking out former finalist David Nalbandian in straight sets, and in a mere ninety-six minutes.

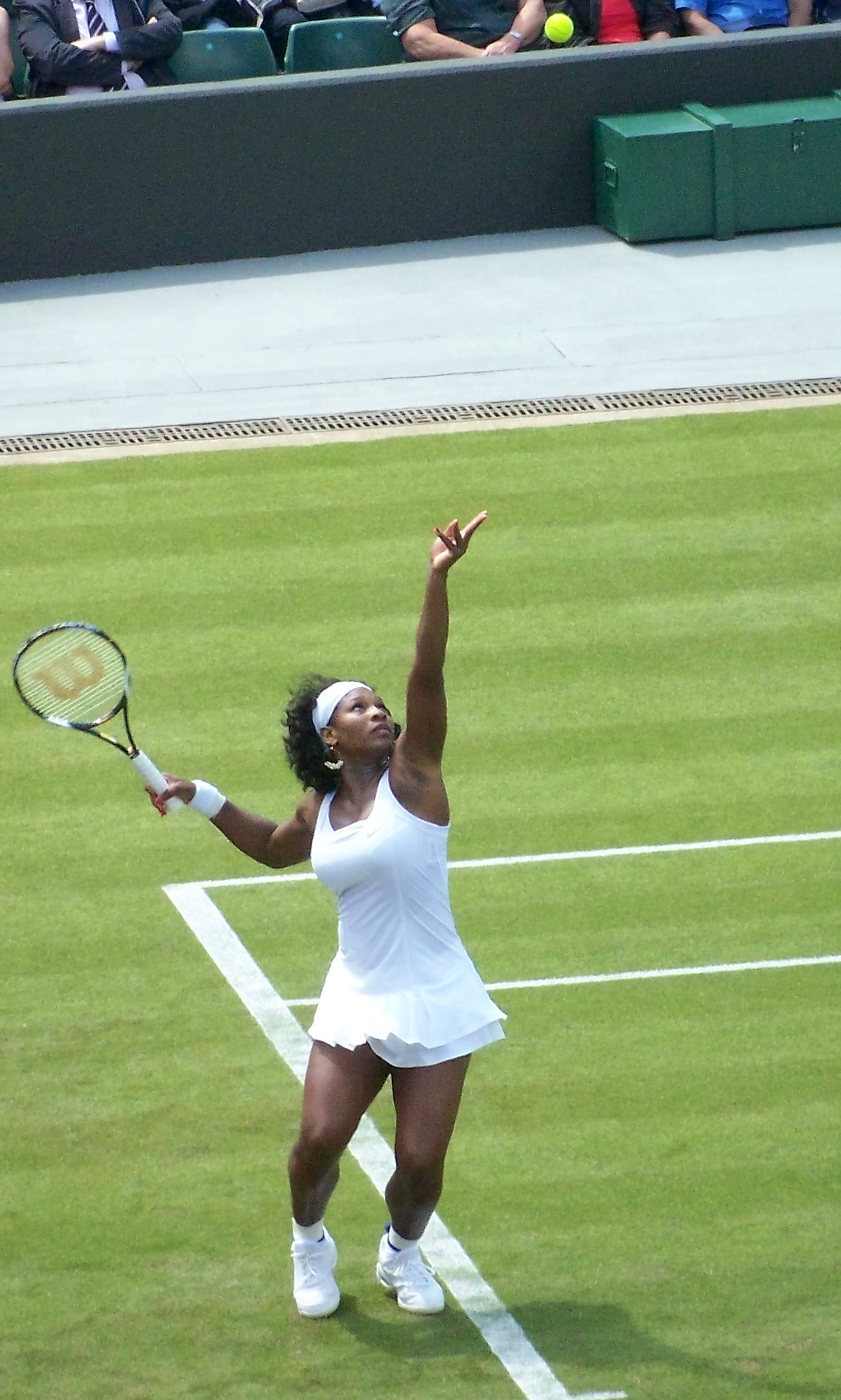
Serena Williams serving against Kaia Kanepi.

In the women's singles, French Open champion and new World No. 1 Ana Ivanovic easily defeated her first round adversary, and was followed in the second round by Nicole Vaidišová, Svetlana Kuznetsova, Agnieszka Radwańska, Ágnes Szávay, Alona Bondarenko, Amélie Mauresmo and 2007 Wimbledon runner-up Marion Bartoli, as well as two-time Wimbledon champion Serena Williams, who was tested against Roland-Garros quarterfinalist Kaia Kanepi, before winning the match on the score of 7–5, 6–3, and sixth seed Anna Chakvetadze, who won her first round encounter 2–6, 6–1, 8–6, saving all four match points her opponent Stéphanie Dubois held against her. Many women seeds fell on the first day, such as Virginie Razzano, who lost to Evgeniya Rodina despite winning the first set with a bagel; Dominika Cibulková, who fell to Zheng Jie; Alizé Cornet, who was defeated by Anastasia Pavlyuchenkova; Maria Kirilenko, who lost to Vera Dushevina; and Patty Schnyder, who was upset by Casey Dellacqua.

- Seeded players out: Gaël Monfils (withdrawal), Ivo Karlović, Michaël Llodra (retirement), David Nalbandian; Dominika Cibulková, Virginie Razzano, Alizé Cornet, Maria Kirilenko, Patty Schnyder.

The men's doubles competition saw no seeds advancing but Australian Open runners-up and Wimbledon defending champions Arnaud Clément & Michaël Llodra were forced to withdraw before their first match, because of Llodra's left arm injury, which had already caused his retirement in the singles earlier in the day.

In the women's doubles competition, French Open mixed doubles champion Victoria Azarenka & partner Shahar Pe'er proceeded to the next round.

- Seeded players out: Michaël Llodra / Arnaud Clément (withdrawal).

(Pictures from Day 1)

== Day 2 ==
In the men's singles, Queen's Club champion, 2006 and 2007 Wimbledon runner-up Rafael Nadal scored his first win, securing a second round spot along with Jarkko Nieminen, Nicolas Kiefer, Tommy Robredo, Richard Gasquet, Paul-Henri Mathieu, Radek Štěpánek, Gilles Simon, Nicolás Almagro, Mikhail Youzhny, James Blake, two-time finalist Andy Roddick, and twelfth seed Andy Murray, who overcame 'The Magician' Fabrice Santoro 6–3, 6–4, 7–6(5), in little more than two hours, while twenty-fifth seed Dmitry Tursunov battled during nearly four hours before claiming a 6–4, 6–7(8), 7–6(7), 3–6, 7–5 win over 2007 Queen's Club finalist Nicolas Mahut. ATP No. 116 Benjamin Becker provided the biggest upset of the tournament thus far with a 6–4, 6–4, 6–4 win over fourth seed Nikolay Davydenko, whose first round exit was the fifth in seven Wimbledon appearances, and Croatian Ivan Ljubičić was upset in a close five-setter by 72nd-ranked, Austrian Jürgen Melzer, on the final score of 6–4, 7–6(7), 4–6, 2–6, 6–3.

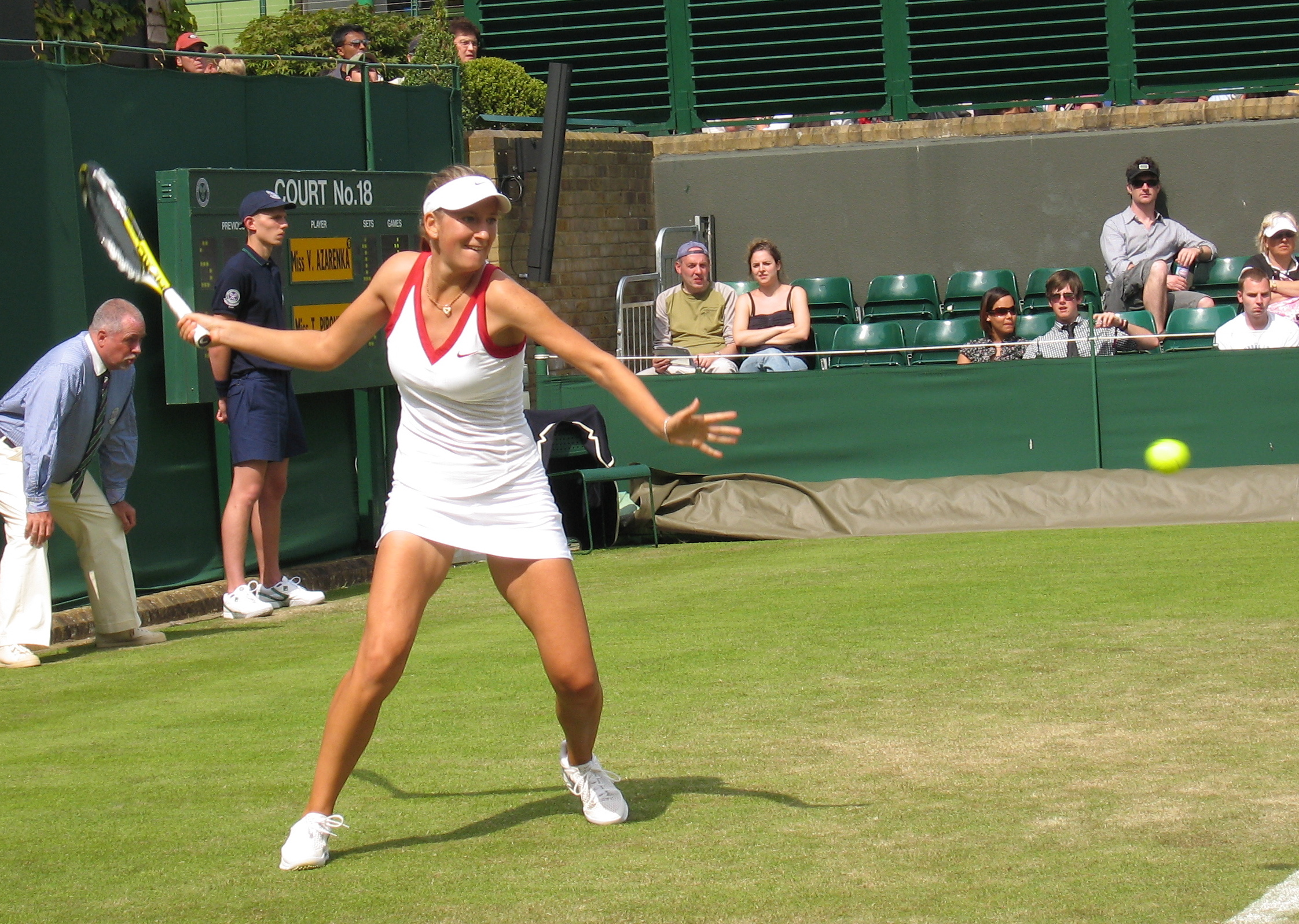
Victoria Azarenka preparing to hit a forehand in her match against Tsvetana Pironkova.

On the women's side, defending champion Venus Williams proceeded to the next round past British hope Naomi Cavaday, alongside Flavia Pennetta, Caroline Wozniacki, Sania Mirza, Sybille Bammer, Maria Sharapova, Francesca Schiavone, Victoria Azarenka, Vera Zvonareva, Nadia Petrova, Shahar Pe'er, Daniela Hantuchová, Jelena Janković, Roland-Garros runner-up Dinara Safina and 1999 Wimbledon champion Lindsay Davenport, in her first appearance since 2005. Twenty-third seed Katarina Srebotnik was knocked out of the tournament at the end of an almost-four-hours-long thriller, in which she held four match points, before her opponent, WTA No. 102 Julia Görges eventually won on the score of 4–6, 7–6(8), 16–14.

- Seeded players out: Nikolay Davydenko, Ivan Ljubičić; Katarina Srebotnik.

In the men's doubles, South Africans Jeff Coetzee & Wesley Moodie won their first round match, as well as Australian Open champions Jonathan Erlich & Andy Ram, who completed their encounter after it was stopped by bad light on Day 1, on the final score of 5–7, 4–6, 6–3, 6–3, 11–9, and Lukáš Dlouhý & Leander Paes, who after five sets of play eventually claimed a 4–6, 6–0, 6–3, 4–6, 6–3 victory. Polish tenth seeds Mariusz Fyrstenberg & Marcin Matkowski were upset in straight sets by Rohan Bopanna & Aisam-ul-Haq Qureshi.

In the women's draw, eleventh-seeded 2000 and 2002 Wimbledon doubles champions Serena Williams & Venus Williams advanced past their first round adversaries in less than an hour.

- Seeded players out: Mariusz Fyrstenberg / Marcin Matkowski.

(Pictures from Day 2)

== Day 3 ==
World No. 1 and defending champion Roger Federer, Stan Wawrinka, Lleyton Hewitt, Feliciano López, Marcos Baghdatis, David Ferrer, Fernando Verdasco and Tomáš Berdych advanced to the next round of the men's top half of the draw, alongside twenty-ninth seed Andreas Seppi, who overcame Frenchman Florent Serra at the end of a close five-setter, on the final score of 6–3, 6–7(4), 6–2, 6–7(5), 6–4. The shock of the day came as former World No. 1, 2000 US Open and 2005 Australian Open champion, and now 75th-ranked Marat Safin took out ATP No. 3, 2007 Wimbledon semifinalist and reigning Australian Open champion Novak Djokovic in straight sets, winning 6–4, 7–6(3), 6–2, after two hours of play. Twenty-first seed Juan Carlos Ferrero also left the tournament, retiring due to a neck injury in the third set of his second round against Halle doubles champion Mischa Zverev, and fifteenth seed and French Open quarterfinalist Fernando González lost a close encounter to Italian Simone Bolelli, on the score of 7–6(8), 7–6(7), 3–6, 7–6(4).

In the women's singles, Elena Dementieva won her first round, and Nicole Vaidišová, Svetlana Kuznetsova, Serena Williams, Ágnes Szávay, Anna Chakvetadze, Amélie Mauresmo, Agnieszka Radwańska and 2007 Wimbledon runner-up Marion Bartoli won their second round matches. New World No. 1 and French Open winner Ana Ivanovic was pushed to the limit, as she saved two match points in the three-hours-and-twenty-minutes thriller that opposed her to WTA No. 97 Nathalie Dechy, and of which she came out the victor on the score of 6–7(2) 7–6(3), 10–8. Twenty-eighth seed and Australian Open doubles champion Alona Bondarenko retired against qualifier Barbora Záhlavová-Strýcová due to a right leg injury, and twentieth seed Francesca Schiavone lost in three sets to Anabel Medina Garrigues, despite holding three consecutive match points in the deciding set.

- Seeded players out: Novak Djokovic, Juan Carlos Ferrero (retirement), Fernando González; Alona Bondarenko (retirement), Francesca Schiavone

In the men's doubles, World No. 1 team Bob Bryan & Mike Bryan proceeded to the second round, along with Brazilian pair Marcelo Melo & André Sá, who won their first round encounter in five sets 6–3, 3–6, 4–6, 6–4, 6–1, Jonas Björkman & Kevin Ullyett, František Čermák & Jordan Kerr and Julien Benneteau & Nicolas Mahut. 2007 US Open champions and fifth seeds Simon Aspelin & Julian Knowle were upset in four sets by Kevin Anderson & Robert Lindstedt.

World No. 1 team and defending champions Cara Black & Liezel Huber, Iveta Benešová & Janette Husárová, Květa Peschke & Rennae Stubbs, Ai Sugiyama & Katarina Srebotnik, Lisa Raymond & Samantha Stosur, Yan Zi & Zheng Jie and Dinara Safina & Ágnes Szávay were among the teams advancing past the first round of the women's doubles event. Meanwhile, eighth seeds Peng Shuai & Sun Tiantian were upset in three sets by Catalina Castaño & Kaia Kanepi, fourth seeds Chan Yung-jan & Chuang Chia-jung fell to Akgul Amanmuradova & Darya Kustova, and in the last match of the day, fourteenth seeds Alicia Molik & Mara Santangelo lost in three sets to Tatiana Perebiynis & Alicja Rosolska.

- Seeded players out: Simon Aspelin / Julian Knowle; Peng Shuai / Sun Tiantian, Chan Yung-jan / Chuang Chia-jung, Alicia Molik / Mara Santangelo.

(Pictures from Day 3)

== Day 4 ==
Among the seeds advancing to the third round in the bottom half of the men's draw were Nicolas Kiefer, Andy Murray, Richard Gasquet, Dmitry Tursunov, Paul-Henri Mathieu, Gilles Simon, Mikhail Youzhny, who prevailed at the end of a three-hours-and-a-half-long five-setter against ATP No. 201, qualifier Stefano Galvani, on the score of 4–6, 6–4, 6–3, 3–6, 6–3, and Radek Štěpánek, who came back from being down two-sets-to-love to defeat Serbian Viktor Troicki 6–7(1), 6–7(3), 6–3, 6–1, 6–2. Second seed, four-time French Open champion, two-time Wimbledon finalist Rafael Nadal had to battle during three hours against Roland-Garros quarterfinalist Ernests Gulbis, before claiming a 5–7, 6–2, 7–6(2), 6–3 victory, and also proceed to the next round. Meanwhile, twenty-third seed Tommy Robredo fell in straight sets to Tommy Haas, twenty-fourth seed Jarkko Nieminen lost in a close match to Marin Čilić on the score of 6–4, 3–6, 6–3, 6–7(6), 7–5, French Open quarterfinalist Nicolás Almagro was upset 6–3, 3–6, 5–7, 6–1, 6–2 by Guillermo García López, and 2003 Australian Open runner-up, and now 94th-ranked Rainer Schüttler eliminated ninth seed James Blake after a five-set-marathon, 6–3, 6–7(8), 4–6, 6–4, 6–4. Sixth seed Andy Roddick fell before the third round for the first time in eight appearances, as the two-time Wimbledon finalist was knocked out of the tournament by ATP No. 40 Janko Tipsarević, 6–7(5), 7–5, 6–4, 7–6(4).

In the women's singles, defending champion Venus Williams advanced to the third round, alongside Caroline Wozniacki, Dinara Safina, Shahar Pe'er, Jelena Janković, Victoria Azarenka, Elena Dementieva and Nadia Petrova. Thirty-second seed Sania Mirza was taken to three sets by WTA No. 101 María José Martínez Sánchez, and eventually lost 6–0, 4–6, 9–7, while thirteenth seed Vera Zvonareva fell to recent 's-Hertogenbosch winner Tamarine Tanasugarn, Austrian Sybille Bammer lost in three sets to Peng Shuai, tenth seed Daniela Hantuchová was upset by Alisa Kleybanova, and twenty-second seed Flavia Pennetta was knocked out by Ai Sugiyama. 1999 Wimbledon champion Lindsay Davenport decided to withdraw from the tournament before her match against Gisela Dulko, due to a knee injury. WTA No. 159, Russian Alla Kudryavtseva produced the biggest upset of the women's field thus far, as she upset compatriot, former World No. 1, 2004 Wimbledon winner, reigning Australian Open champion, and third seed Maria Sharapova in straight sets, on the score of 6–2, 6–4.

- Seeded players out: Tommy Robredo, James Blake, Jarkko Nieminen, Andy Roddick, Nicolás Almagro; Lindsay Davenport (withdrawal), Sania Mirza, Vera Zvonareva, Maria Sharapova, Sybille Bammer, Daniela Hantuchová, Flavia Pennetta.

In the men's doubles, Christopher Kas & Rogier Wassen, Daniel Nestor & Nenad Zimonjić and Max Mirnyi & Jamie Murray advanced to the next round, whereas Czech pair Martin Damm & Pavel Vízner fell, after four sets, to Travis Parrott & Filip Polášek, and fourth seeds Mahesh Bhupathi & Mark Knowles lost to Philipp Petzschner & Alexander Peya. Ninth seeds Lukáš Dlouhý & Leander Paes were among the first teams to reach the third round, along with Christopher Kas & Rogier Wassen, who advanced for the second time in the day, when they received a walkover.

On the women's side, French Open champions Anabel Medina Garrigues & Virginia Ruano Pascual cruised to the second round, along with Bethanie Mattek & Sania Mirza, and Serena Williams & Venus Williams were the first pair to advance to the third round. Australian Open champions Alona Bondarenko & Kateryna Bondarenko withdrew from the competition, due to the right leg injury which had already forced Alona Bondarenko to retire in her singles match on the previous day, and twelfth seeds Svetlana Kuznetsova & Amélie Mauresmo also chose to withdraw.

- Seeded players out: Martin Damm / Pavel Vízner, Mahesh Bhupathi / Mark Knowles; Alona Bondarenko / Kateryna Bondarenko (withdrawal), Svetlana Kuznetsova / Amélie Mauresmo (withdrawal).

(Pictures from Day 4)

== Day 5 ==
Rain interrupted play for about an hour and a half during the early afternoon in what was the first rain delay of the 2008 Championships.

World No. 1 and five-time Wimbledon winner Roger Federer cruised to the fourth round of the men's singles, along with Lleyton Hewitt, Feliciano López, 2006 semifinalist and 2007 quarterfinalist Marcos Baghdatis, and thirteenth seed Stan Wawrinka, who was leading two-sets-to-love when his opponent Mischa Zverev retired. Twenty-second seed and Nottingham finalist Fernando Verdasco knocked out eleventh seed and 2007 Wimbledon quarterfinalist Tomáš Berdych, crushing the Czech in the third set to win 6–4, 6–4, 6–0, in little more than an-hour-and-a-half, 2004 Wimbledon semifinalist Mario Ančić edged fifth seed and 's-Hertogenbosch titlist David Ferrer after more than three hours of play, on the final score of 6–4, 6–4, 6–7(5), 7–6(3), and former World No. 1 and now ATP No. 75 Marat Safin continued his run in the tournament, taking out twenty-ninth seed Andreas Seppi in four sets 7–6(5), 3–6, 7–6(3), 6–4.

In the women's singles, Nicole Vaidišová, Svetlana Kuznetsova, Anna Chakvetadze, Agnieszka Radwańska and Ágnes Szávay advanced to the fourth round, alongside two-time Wimbledon champion Serena Williams, who defeated 2006 champion Amélie Mauresmo 7–6(5), 6–1. Meanwhile, unseeded American Bethanie Mattek upset defending finalist and eleventh seed Marion Bartoli in straight sets. The shock of the day was produced by 2006 Australian Open and 2006 Wimbledon doubles champion and wild card Zheng Jie, as the WTA No. 133 knocked out of the tournament World No. 1, French Open champion and 2007 Wimbledon semifinalist Ana Ivanovic in straight sets, on the score of 6–1, 6–4.

- Seeded players out: Tomáš Berdych, David Ferrer, Andreas Seppi; Marion Bartoli, Amélie Mauresmo, Ana Ivanovic.

Among the teams advancing to the men's doubles' third round were top-ranked Bob Bryan & Mike Bryan, František Čermák & Jordan Kerr, Marcelo Melo & André Sá, Julien Benneteau & Nicolas Mahut, Jonas Björkman & Kevin Ullyett and Australian Open champions Jonathan Erlich & Andy Ram, who overcame Stephen Huss & Ross Hutchins after five sets 6–7(3), 6–4, 3–6, 6–3, 6–4.

In the women's doubles competition, World No. 1 team and defending champions Cara Black & Liezel Huber, Květa Peschke & Rennae Stubbs, Victoria Azarenka & Shahar Pe'er, Lisa Raymond & Samantha Stosur and Dinara Safina & Ágnes Szávay proceeded to the third round, while fifteenth seeds Iveta Benešová & Janette Husárová were taken out in straight sets by Vania King & Alla Kudryavtseva, and second seeds Ai Sugiyama & Katarina Srebotnik lost on the score of 2–6, 6–3, 11–9 to Raquel Kops-Jones & Abigail Spears.

- Seeded players out: Iveta Benešová / Janette Husárová, Ai Sugiyama / Katarina Srebotnik.

(Pictures from Day 5)

== Day 6 ==
In the men's singles, 2006 and 2007 Wimbledon runner-up Rafael Nadal advanced past German twenty-seventh seed Nicolas Kiefer in straight sets, 2007 Wimbledon semifinalist Richard Gasquet edged compatriot, twenty-eighth-seeded Gilles Simon after four sets and little more than two hours on the score of 6–3, 6–3, 6–7(3), 6–3, and unseeded Serbian Janko Tipsarević matched his 2007 Wimbledon performance, as he qualified for the fourth round in defeating twenty-fifth seed Dmitry Tursunov in straight sets 7–6(1), 7–6(3), 6–3. Twelfth seed Andy Murray lost one set to his opponent, former ATP No. 2 Tommy Haas, but eventually won the match after two-hours-and-a-half of play, on the final score of 6–4, 6–7(4), 6–3, 6–2, nineteen-year-old Croatian Marin Čilić defeated fourteenth seed Paul-Henri Mathieu, and Mikhail Youzhny prevailed at the end of a four-hours-and-fourteen-minutes-long five-setter against Radek Štěpánek, on the score of 7–5, 6–7(5),6–4, 6–7(4), 6–3.

On the women's side, Elena Dementieva and Venus Williams advanced to the fourth round, alongside second seed Jelena Janković who fought back from being led one-set-to-love, to defeat thirty-first seed Caroline Wozniacki 2–6, 6–4, 6–2, and twenty-first seed Nadia Petrova, who upset 2007 US Open and 2008 French Open mixed doubles champion and sixteenth seed Victoria Azarenka in straight sets and two tie-breaks 7–6(11), 7–6(4). Australian Open doubles runner-up Shahar Pe'er and French Open singles runner-up Dinara Safina battled during three-hours-and-twenty-five-minutes, with Peer dominating up to the midst of the second set, when the Russian came back, saving one match point, and Safina dominating up to the end of the third set, when Peer came back, breaking her adversary one final time to claim a 7–5, 6–7(4), 8–6 victory.

- Seeded players out: Dmitry Tursunov, Gilles Simon, Nicolas Kiefer, Paul-Henri Mathieu, Radek Štěpánek; Caroline Wozniacki, Victoria Azarenka, Dinara Safina.

Top-ranked Bob Bryan & Mike Bryan came back from a one set deficit to defeat thirteenth seeds František Čermák & Jordan Kerr, and reach the quarterfinals of the men's doubles. Daniel Nestor & Nenad Zimonjić, Max Mirnyi & Jamie Murray advanced to the third round, while South Africans eleventh seeds Jeff Coetzee & Wesley Moodie were upset in straight sets 7–6(2),6–2, 7–6(3), by unseeded Feliciano López & Fernando Verdasco, and fifteenth seeds Christopher Kas & Rogier Wassen lost to Philipp Petzschner & Alexander Peya.

2008 French Open champions and fifth seeds Anabel Medina Garrigues & Virginia Ruano Pascual, thirteenth seeds Bethanie Mattek & Sania Mirza, ninth seeds Yan Zi & Zheng Jie cruised to the third round of the women's doubles, while top-ranked Cara Black & Liezel Huber advanced to the quarterfinals.

Almost all seeds in the mixed doubles advanced to the third round, among which Pavel Vízner & Květa Peschke, Simon Aspelin & Lisa Raymond, Mike Bryan & Katarina Srebotnik, Andy Ram & Nathalie Dechy, Daniel Nestor & Chuang Chia-jung, Julian Knowle & Chan Yung-jan and Kevin Ullyett & Ai Sugiyama. Nenad Zimonjić & Sun Tiantian lost in straight sets, however, to Lukáš Dlouhý & Nicole Vaidišová, Mark Knowles & Yan Zi were upset by Scott Lipsky & Casey Dellacqua, Mahesh Bhupathi & Sania Mirza fell to Igor Andreev & Maria Kirilenko, and Leander Paes & Rennae Stubbs were knocked out by Jonas Björkman & Alicia Molik.

- Seeded players out: František Čermák / Jordan Kerr, Jeff Coetzee / Wesley Moodie, Christopher Kas / Rogier Wassen; Nenad Zimonjić / Sun Tiantian, Mark Knowles / Yan Zi, Mahesh Bhupathi / Sania Mirza, Leander Paes / Rennae Stubbs.

(Pictures from Day 6)

== Middle Sunday ==
Middle Sunday in Wimbledon is traditionally a rest day, without any play, and this was the case in 2008. The seventh day of the competition, consequently, was Monday 30 June.

== Day 7 ==
Five-time Wimbledon winner, defending champion and World No. 1 Roger Federer advanced to the tournament's quarterfinals for the seventh time in ten participations past former World No. 1 and 2002 Wimbledon titlist Lleyton Hewitt after less than two hours of play, on the score of 7–6(7), 6–2, 6–4, while second seed, 2006 and 2007 finalist Rafael Nadal left no hopes to seventeenth seed Mikhail Youzhny, as he defeated the Russian 6–3, 6–3, 6–1. 2004 Wimbledon semifinalist and ATP No. 43 Mario Ančić was led two-sets-to-love by Nottingham finalist and twenty-second seed Fernando Verdasco, when he started a comeback, winning the third set, and overcoming Verdasco's 4–1 lead to take the fourth, to ultimately win the match, after the two players repeatedly broke each other in the one-hour-and-half-long fifth set, on the final score of 3–6, 4–6, 6–3, 6–4, 13–11, after nearly four hours of play, and set a rematch of the 2006 Wimbledon quarterfinal against Federer. Thirty-first-seeded Feliciano López climbed back from being led two-sets-to-one, and saved three match points, the third one with an ace on his second service, to finally beat tenth seed, 2006 semifinalist and 2007 Wimbledon quarterfinalist Marcos Baghdatis after almost four hours of play, 5–7, 6–2, 3–6, 7–6(4), 8–6. In the first fourth round match involving two unseeded players, ATP No. 94 and 2003 Australian Open runner-up Rainer Schüttler dominated ATP No. 40, victor of Andy Roddick, Serbian Janko Tipsarević 6–3, 3–6, 6–4, 7–6(4), and in the second one, 2001 Australian Open runner-up and 2007 Wimbledon doubles champion, ATP No. 145 Arnaud Clément outplayed nineteen-year-old Croatian, ATP No. 55 Marin Čilić, in straight sets 6–3, 7–5, 6–2. Former World No. 1 Marat Safin eliminated a third consecutive seed in the tournament, as he beat Rome Masters finalist Stan Wawrinka for the first time in three encounters, on the score of 6–4, 6–3, 5–7, 6–1, to match his best result in Wimbledon, a 2001 quarterfinal. Eighth seed, 2007 Wimbledon semifinalist, Frenchman Richard Gasquet entirely dominated his adversary, twelfth seed, British Andy Murray during two sets, and up to the end of the third one, when he served to win the match, before Murray broke the Frenchman back and won the set's tie-break, eventually taking back the control of the encounter, racing through the fourth set and breaking early in the fifth to win, in almost complete darkness, at 21:30 (UTC+1), after four hours of play, on the score of 5–7, 3–6, 7–6(3), 6–2, 6–4, and, reaching his first Grand Slam quarterfinal, complete the round of eight line up.

The women's competition saw top seeds continue to fall, as WTA No. 60 and 's-Hertogenbosch titlist Tamarine Tanasugarn knocked out second seed Jelena Janković 6–3, 6–2, in a mere seventy-five minutes, to advance for the first time in her career to the quarterfinals of a Grand Slam event, and Eastbourne titlist and fourteenth seed Agnieszka Radwańska took back the control of her match, after scoring only one game in the second set, to defeat her opponent WTA No. 4 and 2007 Wimbledon quarterfinalist Svetlana Kuznetsova 6–4, 1–6, 7–5. Kuznetsova and Janković's losses, together with the defeats of Ivanovic and Sharapova earlier in the tournament, meant that none of the top four seeds reached the quarterfinals of a Grand Slam for the first time in the Open Era. The 133rd-ranked Zheng Jie also continued her run in the tournament, defeating fifteenth seed Ágnes Szávay 6–3, 6–4, and progressing to become the first women's wild card entry to reach the Wimbledon quarterfinals. Defending champion Venus Williams advanced to her ninth quarterfinals at Wimbledon in twelve appearances, past 42nd-ranked Russian Alisa Kleybanova, and her sister Serena Williams dispatched compatriot WTA No. 69 Bethanie Mattek in straight sets 6–3, 6–3. Eighteenth seed Nicole Vaidišová recovered from the loss of the first set to win the second in a tie-break, and eventually overcome her opponent eighth seed Anna Chakvetadze after two hours of play, on the score of 4–6, 7–6(0), 6–3, Russian twenty-first seed and recent Eastbourne runner-up Nadia Petrova easily defeated compatriot and victor of Maria Sharapova, 154th-ranked Alla Kudryavtseva 6–1, 6–4, in little more than an hour, and Elena Dementieva, the highest seed remaining in the draw, crushed Israeli twenty-fourth seed Shahar Pe'er 6–2, 6–1.

- Seeded players out: Lleyton Hewitt, Fernando Verdasco, Marcos Baghdatis, Mikhail Youzhny, Stan Wawrinka, Richard Gasquet; Jelena Janković, Ágnes Szávay, Anna Chakvetadze, Svetlana Kuznetsova, Shahar Pe'er.

In the men's doubles, ninth seeds Lukáš Dlouhý & Leander Paes proceeded to the quarterfinals, alongside Australian Open champions Jonathan Erlich & Andy Ram, who defeated sixteenth-seeded Frenchmen Julien Benneteau & Nicolas Mahut 4–6, 6–7(4), 7–6(3), 6–3, 6–4, and second seeds Daniel Nestor & Nenad Zimonjić, who beat fourteenth-seeded Max Mirnyi & Jamie Murray in straight sets. Meanwhile, Brazilian twelfth seeds Marcelo Melo & André Sá decided to withdraw from the tournament, giving a walkover to unseeded Kevin Anderson & Robert Lindstedt, and Feliciano López & Fernando Verdasco's withdrawal allowed eight-seeded team Jonas Björkman & Kevin Ullyett to complete the quarterfinals' line up.

On the women's side, sixteenth-seeded pair Lisa Raymond & Rennae Stubbs beat third seeds Květa Peschke & Rennae Stubbs to reach the quarterfinals, along with sixth seeds Victoria Azarenka & Shahar Pe'er, who defeated tenth seeds Dinara Safina & Ágnes Szávay, unseeded Ekaterina Makarova & Selima Sfar, who upset ninth-seeded Chinese pair Yan Zi & Zheng Jie, two-time champions Serena Williams & Venus Williams, who knocked out fifth seeds and French Open champions Anabel Medina Garrigues & Virginia Ruano Pascual, and thirteenth seeds Bethanie Mattek & Sania Mirza.

In the mixed event, fourteenth seeds Martin Damm & Peng Shuai obtained a walkover to the third round as their unseeded opponents withdrew, while unseeded team of French Open mixed doubles champion Bob Bryan & partner Samantha Stosur dispatched sixteenth seeds Jordan Kerr & Kateryna Bondarenko, unseeded Belarusians Max Mirnyi & Olga Govortsova beat fifteenth seeds Jeff Coetzee & Vladimíra Uhlířová, and defending champion Jamie Murray and partner Liezel Huber also advanced. Czech team Pavel Vízner & Květa Peschke were the first pair to advance to the quarterfinals, as their scheduled third round adversaries thirteenth seeds Simon Aspelin & Lisa Raymond decided to withdraw.

- Seeded players out: Marcelo Melo / André Sá (withdrawal), Julien Benneteau / Nicolas Mahut, Max Mirnyi / Jamie Murray; Květa Peschke / Rennae Stubbs, Dinara Safina / Ágnes Szávay, Yan Zi / Zheng Jie, Anabel Medina Garrigues / Virginia Ruano Pascual; Jordan Kerr / Kateryna Bondarenko, Jeff Coetzee / Vladimíra Uhlířová, Simon Aspelin / Lisa Raymond (withdrawal).

(Pictures from Day 7)

== Day 8 ==
On 'Ladies Day' in Wimbledon, seventh seed, four-time winner and defending champion Venus Williams easily defeated 's-Hertogenbosch titlist, WTA No. 60 Tamarine Tanasugarn in straight sets 6–4, 6–3 for the seventh time in seven meetings, to advance to the semifinals. Fifth seed Elena Dementieva, the highest seeded player remaining in the draw, survived a comeback by opponent and compatriot, Eastbourne runner-up Nadia Petrova, as the twenty-first seed climbed back from being down one-set-to-love, 1–5, to win the second set in a tie-break, forcing Dementieva to raise her level of play to eventually claim a 6–1, 6–7(6), 6–3 victory, and advance to her first semifinal appearance in Wimbledon, against Venus Williams. Sixth seed, two-time Wimbledon champion Serena Williams needed only fifty-one minutes to dispatch her quarterfinal opponent, fourteenth seed, recent Eastbourne winner, nineteen-year-old Agnieszka Radwańska 6–4, 6–0, and proceed to her fifth Wimbledon semifinal in nine appearances. In the last quarterfinal of the women's event, Chinese wild card, 133rd-ranked Zheng Jie, upset eighteenth seed Nicole Vaidišová after three sets and nearly two hours, on the score of 6–2, 5–7, 6–1, to continue her run in the tournament and reach her first ever Grand Slam semifinal in a singles draw, to meet Serena Williams. Zheng, who had already set a record for the furthest progression by a women's wild card at Wimbledon, also became the first Chinese player to reach the singles' semifinals in a Grand Slam tournament.

- Seeded players out: Nadia Petrova, Agnieszka Radwańska, Nicole Vaidišová.

In the men's doubles event, ninth-seeded Lukáš Dlouhý & Leander Paes knocked out Australian Open champions, Israeli third seeds Jonathan Erlich & Andy Ram 6–3, 6–3, 6–3, to reach the semifinals. They were joined by second seeds Daniel Nestor & Nenad Zimonjić, who needed four sets to beat unseeded Kevin Anderson & Robert Lindstedt 7–6(5), 6–4, 6–7(5), 6–3, top-ranked Bob Bryan & Mike Bryan, who defeated unseeded Marcel Granollers & Santiago Ventura 7–6(3), 6–2, 6–0, and eight seeds Jonas Björkman & Kevin Ullyett who prevailed over unseeded Philipp Petzschner & Alexander Peya after four hours and five sets, on the score of 7–6(5), 4–6, 6–3, 6–7(5), 6–2.

Mixed doubles fourth seeds Paul Hanley & Cara Black advanced to the third round, while defending champion Jamie Murray & partner Liezel Huber proceeded past sixth-seeded Julian Knowle & Chan Yung-jan to the quarterfinals of the event, alongside ninth seeds and 2007 French Open champions Andy Ram & Nathalie Dechy, and second seeds Daniel Nestor & Chuang Chia-jung.

- Seeded players out: Jonathan Erlich / Andy Ram; Julian Knowle / Chan Yung-jan.

(Pictures from Day 8)

== Day 9 ==
For the second time of the competition, rain perturbated the play in Wimbledon, stopping all ongoing matches in the morning, and once more for an hour in the early afternoon, allowing the play to resume only around 16:30 (UTC+1).

Five-time Wimbledon winner and defending champion, World No. 1 Roger Federer scored his sixth straight win over ATP No. 43 Mario Ančić since the Croatian won their first encounter in the first round of the 2002 Wimbledon Championships, the last match to date Federer lost at the All England Lawn Tennis and Croquet Club, as the Swiss ace defeated his opponent 6–1, 7–5, 6–4, in less than two hours of play, and advanced to his record-setting seventeenth consecutive Grand Slam semifinal. In the second quarterfinal of the day, which decided of Federer's opponent, ATP No. 75, former World No. 1 Marat Safin secured his seventh career semifinal spot in a Grand Slam event, the first since he won the 2005 Australian Open, as the Russian came back from a one set deficit to beat thirty-first seed, Dubai runner-up Feliciano López, on the score of 3–6, 7–5, 7–6(1), 6–3. In the first quarterfinal of the bottom half of the draw, 2006 and 2007 Wimbledon finalist and ATP No. 2 Rafael Nadal completely dominated his opponent, twelfth seed Andy Murray, in less than two hours, defeating the British in straight sets 6–3, 6–2, 6–4. The match between Rainer Schüttler and Arnaud Clément to decide of the last semifinalist, Nadal's opponent, was stopped due to darkness right after Clement evened to score to one-set-all.

- Seeded players out: Feliciano López, Andy Murray.

In the women's doubles competition, sixteenth seeds, 2001 Wimbledon doubles champion Lisa Raymond & partner Samantha Stosur came out the winners of the first of the four quarterfinals matches, defeating unseeded pair Ekaterina Makarova & Selima Sfar 6–4, 6–3. Two-time Wimbledon doubles champions and semifinalists in the ongoing singles event, eleventh-seeded Serena Williams & Venus Williams outplayed thirteenth-seeded duo of American Bethanie Mattek and Indian Sania Mirza on the score of 6–4, 6–3, to secure a spot in the semifinals. The third match of the day saw top-ranked and defending champions Cara Black & Liezel Huber overcome Australian Open runners-up and Wimbledon sixth seeds Victoria Azarenka & Shahar Pe'er 7–5, 7–6(4), to advance to a semifinal against Raymond & Stosur. In an encounter between unseeded teams, Frenchwoman Nathalie Dechy & Australian Casey Dellacqua prevailed over Spanish duo Nuria Llagostera Vives & María José Martínez Sánchez 2–6, 6–7(6), 6–4, to meet the Williams sisters, and complete the semifinals line up.

In the mixed doubles event, fifth seeds Kevin Ullyett & Ai Sugiyama proceeded past Jonas Björkman & Alicia Molik to the quarterfinals, along with top seeded Mike Bryan & Katarina Srebotnik, who defeated fourteenth seeds Martin Damm & Peng Shuai 7–6(4), 6–2, and unseeded Bob Bryan & Samantha Stosur, who upset fourth-seeded Paul Hanley & Cara Black. Meanwhile, defending champion Jamie Murray & partner Liezel Huber defeated second seeds Daniel Nestor & Chuang Chia-jung in the first quarterfinals match of the event.

- Seeded players out: Bethanie Mattek / Sania Mirza, Victoria Azarenka / Shahar Pe'er; Martin Damm / Peng Shuai, Paul Hanley / Cara Black, Daniel Nestor / Chuang Chia-jung.

(Pictures from Day 9)

== Day 10 ==
Rain delayed play again, stopping all matches for a short time in the mid-afternoon, and once more for a longer period in the late afternoon. Play resumed at around 18:00 (UTC+1).

The men's last quarterfinal, stopped before the night on Day 9, resumed on the score of 6–3, 5–7, to see ATP No. 94 Rainer Schüttler win the third set's tie-break, ATP No. 145 Arnaud Clément win the fourth's after a rain delay, and the two former Australian Open runners-up battle through the fifth set, with Clement first holding a match point on the German's serve, Schüttler breaking but immediately being broken back, the rain stopping the play at 6–6, 40-all on the Frenchman's serve, and, eventually, Schüttler breaking Clement right after the play resumed and win, on his third match point on the score of 3–6, 7–5, 6–7(6), 7–6(7), 8–6, after five hours and twelve minutes played on two days, and reach his second Grand Slam semifinal, setting up a clash with Rafael Nadal. The match became historically significant as the second longest men's singles match in terms of time played, in Wimbledon history, the longest remaining a 1989 second round match between Greg Holmes and Todd Witsken, which lasted five hours and twenty-eight minutes.

The first semifinal of the women's singles saw four-time winner and defending champion, seventh seed Venus Williams dominate her opponent Elena Dementieva during the first set, winning it 6–1 in thirty-eight minutes, before the Russian fifth seed fought back in the second, breaking Williams right after losing her serve to even the score, and holding to a second set tie-break. The American then left no chances to Dementieva, breaking her repeatedly to win the tie-break 7–3, and claim a 6–1, 7–6(3) victory, after nearly two hours of play, to advance to her thirteenth Grand Slam final since the 1997 US Open, her seventh in Wimbledon. The second semifinal between two-time champion, sixth seed Serena Williams and wild card, WTA No. 133 Zheng Jie followed the same pattern as the first, with Williams dominating her opponent in the first set, winning it 6–2, and the Chinese fighting back in the second, taking the match to a tie-break after holding a set point on Williams's serve. Williams, though, kept her edge on Zheng, winning the tie-break 7–5, to claim a 6–2, 7–6(5) victory, and proceed to her eleventh Grand Slam final since the 1999 US Open, the fourth in Wimbledon. Venus and Serena Williams's wins marked the first time since Wimbledon 2003 the two sisters would meet in a Grand Slam final, the seventh time overall, with Serena having won five of their six previous Grand Slam final meetings, including the two played in Wimbledon, in 2002 and 2003.

- Seeded players out: Elena Dementieva.

In the first men's doubles semifinal, which lasted more than three hours, being interrupted several times by rain delays, World No. 1s and 2006 Wimbledon champions Bob Bryan & Mike Bryan battled a close match against eighth-seeded 2002, 2003 and 2004 champion Jonas Björkman & partner Kevin Ullyett, but the top-ranked Americans lost all three tie-breaks played against their adversaries, allowing Bjorkman & Ullyett to win on the score of 7–6(3), 5–7, 7–6(5), 7–6(9). The win meant Bjorkman would reach his fifteenth Grand Slam doubles final since the 1994 French Open, Ullyett would reach his third one since the 2001 US Open, and the pair would reach their first Grand Slam final together. The other semifinal, between ninth seeds Lukáš Dlouhý & Leander Paes and second seeds Daniel Nestor & Nenad Zimonjić was stopped due to darkness as the latter led 7–6(4), 4–6, 6–1, 3–3.

The quarterfinals of the mixed doubles event continued, and saw all-Russian, unseeded pair of Igor Andreev & Maria Kirilenko upset all-Czech pair and third seeds Pavel Vízner & Květa Peschke in straight sets 6–3, 6–4, to reach their first Grand Slam semifinal together. In the second quarterfinal of the bottom half of the draw, unseeded team of men's doubles No. 1 Bob Bryan & former women's doubles No. 1 Samantha Stosur defeated ninth seeds and 2007 French Open mixed champions Andy Ram & Nathalie Dechy 6–4, 6–2, to join Jamie Murray & Liezel Huber in the semifinals. Finally, top seeds Mike Bryan & Katarina Srebotnik took three sets to beat their quarterfinal opponents, fifth-seeded Kevin Ullyett, who had just won his men's doubles semifinal, & Ai Sugiyama, Srebotnik's usual partner in women's doubles, on the score of 6–3, 3–6, 6–3, to set up to a clash with Andreev & Kirilenko, and complete the semifinals line up.

- Seeded players out: Bob Bryan / Mike Bryan; Pavel Vízner / Květa Peschke, Andy Ram / Nathalie Dechy, Kevin Ullyett / Ai Sugiyama.

(Pictures from Day 10)

== Day 11 ==
The first semifinal of the men's singles was the eleventh encounter between World No. 1 and defending champion Roger Federer, and former World No. 1, now 75th-ranked and victor, earlier in the tournament, of ATP No. 3 Novak Djokovic, Russian Marat Safin, whose appearance in the semifinals was the first in a Grand Slam since he won the 2005 Australian Open, where he defeated Federer in the semifinal. The Swiss broke Safin in his first service game, racing through the first set to take it 6–3, before the Russian raised his level of play, and both players went on keeping their serves to a second set tie-break, which Safin eventually lost 3–7, letting Federer take his two-sets-to-love advantage to pressure him, and eventually break in the last game of the third set to claim a 6–3, 7–6(3), 6–4 victory, in less than two hours. The win meant Federer would reach his sixteenth Grand Slam final, and his sixth consecutive one in Wimbledon, already equalling Björn Borg's record of runs at the tournament, from his first win at the 1976 Wimbledon Championships to his lost final, after having won five consecutive ones, to John McEnroe at the 1981 Wimbledon Championships. The second semifinal opposed ATP No. 2, French Open and Queen's Club Championships winner, and defending finalist Rafael Nadal, to unseeded, 2003 Australian Open runner-up Rainer Schüttler, ATP No. 94, who finished his semifinal against Arnaud Clément only on the previous afternoon, after three-hours-and-a-half of play. Nadal raced early to a 4–0 lead, taking the first set 6–1, before Schüttler started to fight back, breaking the Spanish and dominating him through the second set, keeping his serve until 5–4, when serving to even the score to one-set-all, Nadal broke him, eventually winning the set in a tie-break 7–3, and keeping his edge on the German up to the end of the third set to win, in little more than two hours, on the score of 6–1, 7–6(3), 6–4. The win allowed Nadal to advance to his seventh Grand Slam final, his third consecutive one in Wimbledon, and set up his eighteenth meeting against Roger Federer, the sixth in a Grand Slam final.

- Seeded players out: None.

The second men's doubles semifinal, between ninth seeds Lukáš Dlouhý & Leander Paes and second seeds Daniel Nestor & Nenad Zimonjić, and which was stopped by the night on Day 10 as the latter were leading 7–6(4), 4–6, 6–1, 3–3, resumed, to see the Czech Dlouhy and the Indian, 1999 Wimbledon champion Paes break their opponents and win the fourth set, taking the match to a fifth one, in which 2002 Wimbledon doubles runner-up Nestor & 2004 and 2006 runner-up Zimonjic made the difference, ultimately clinching a 7–6(4), 4–6, 6–1, 4–6, 8–6 victory, to face Jonas Björkman & Kevin Ullyett, and try, for Nestor, to finally complete a career Grand Slam and for Zimonjić, to win his first ever Grand Slam title.

The semifinals of the women's doubles took place, first confronting 2000 and 2002 champions and eleventh seeds Serena Williams & Venus Williams, to unseeded Frenchwoman Nathalie Dechy & Australian Casey Dellacqua, with the Williams sisters, who lost no set since the beginning of the competition, dominating their opponents throughout the encounter, winning the match 6–3, 6–3, after only an hour of play and advance to their third doubles final in Wimbledon, having won the two first ones. That win also marked the second time since the 2002 Wimbledon Championships Serena and Venus Williams would be facing each other in the singles final, and be present together in the doubles final. The top half of the draw's semifinal took place between top ranked, recent Birmingham and Eastbourne winners and defending champions Cara Black & Liezel Huber, and sixteenth-seeded 2001 doubles champion Lisa Raymond & partner Samantha Stosur, with the latter taking the early advantages in each set, breaking the World No. 1s four times during the encounter and eventually knocking them out of the tournament on the score of 6–3, 6–3, in little more than an hour, to reach their fourth Grand Slam final together, after the 2005 US Open, the 2006 Australian Open and the 2006 French Open.

In the first semifinal of the mixed event, top seeds Mike Bryan & Katarina Srebotnik entirely dominated their unseeded opponents Igor Andreev & Maria Kirilenko to win the match on the final score of 6–4, 6–2, after little more than an hour, and proceed to their first Grand Slam final together. The win allowed Mike Bryan to advance to his fourth Grand Slam mixed final, his second in Wimbledon after finishing as the runner-up in 2001, and Srebotnik to advance to her eighth Grand Slam mixed final, her first in Wimbledon. Twelfth-seeded defending champion Jamie Murray & partner, women's doubles No. 1 Liezel Huber made the strongest start of their semifinal against unseeded Bob Bryan & Samantha Stosur quickly taking the first set 6–2 in twenty-one minutes, before Bryan & Stosur started to fight back, taking the second set to a tie-break, easily winning it 7–1, and extending their domination in the third set, eventually taking the match 2–6, 7–6(1), 6–4, to reach their first Grand Slam mixed doubles final together. The final would be Bob Bryan's sixth, the second in Wimbledon, after a 2006 loss, and Stosur's second, after the 2005 Australian Open. The win marked the second time in the year Bob Bryan and Katarina Srebotnik would face each other in a Grand Slam mixed doubles final, having already confronted at the French Open, set up the first ever meeting in a Grand Slam final of Bob and Mike Bryan, and marked the first time, with Stosur's win, a player would be present in both the doubles and the mixed doubles final of Wimbledon since Cara Black in 2004.

- Seeded players out: Lukáš Dlouhý / Leander Paes; Cara Black / Liezel Huber; Jamie Murray / Liezel Huber.

(Pictures from Day 11)

== Day 12 ==
The final of the women's singles competition started at 14:00 (UTC+1) on the Centre Court of the Wimbledon's All England Lawn Tennis and Croquet Club. WTA No. 6 and sixth seed, 2002 and 2003 Wimbledon Champion Serena Williams and WTA No. 7 and seventh seed, 2000, 2001, 2005 and 2007 champion Venus Williams met for the third time in a Wimbledon final, and for the seventh time overall in Grand Slam finals, with Serena winning five of the six previous encounters. Serena made the stronger start, breaking her sister in her first service game, and quickly took a 4–2 lead, as Venus struggled with her return. The momentum of the first set then shifted, when Venus started to play more aggressively, breaking Serena to even the score, and breaking her again in the last game to win the set 7–5 after fifty-three minutes. Venus struggled again with her serve in the beginning of the second set, saving a break point in her first service game, She was broken in her second, but broke back to 2–2. Both players then held their serve up to 5–4, when Serena found herself serving to stay in the match at 15–40, saving the first match point, but losing the second on an unforced error to give Venus the break and a 7–5, 6–4 victory after one hour and eleven minutes of play. The win allowed Venus to defend her title and was her fifth Wimbledon title, her seventh Grand Slam title overall.

The men's doubles final followed the women's singles' one on Centre Court. The eighth-seeded team of ATP doubles No. 21 and former World No. 1 and three-time Wimbledon doubles champion Jonas Björkman & current ATP doubles No. 14, partner Kevin Ullyett, the oldest pair in the field, both aged thirty-six, met the World No. 2 duo of Daniel Nestor, a Wimbledon 2002 runner-up & Nenad Zimonjić, a finalist at the All England Lawn Tennis and Croquet Club in 2004 and 2006. Both teams remained close through the first two sets, with neither pair breaking the other, and each set going to a tie-break, the first won 14–12 by Nestor & Zimonjic, the second 7–3 by Bjorkman & Ullyett. The second seeds proved more efficient in the third set, winning their only break point and holding their advantage to the end to take a two-sets-to-one lead. The fourth set resembled the third, with Nestor & Zimonjic converting their two break points, while their opponents were unable to attack them on their service games. Nestor & Zimonjic won the match 7–6(12), 6–7(3), 6–3, 6–3, after more than two-hours-and-a-half of play, making them the 2008 Wimbledon champions. The victory marked Nestor & Zimonjic's first as a team in a Grand Slam tournament, after finishing as the runners-up of the French Open. It also allowed Nestor to become the twenty-first player in tennis history and the eleventh in the Open Era to complete a career Grand Slam, after winning previously at the 2002 Australian Open, the 2004 US Open and the 2007 French Open. He is also the third male player to complete a career Golden Slam, as Nestor also won the gold medal at the 2000 Olympics.

The last final of the day to be played on the Centre Court was the women's doubles'. Eleventh-seeded two-time winning pair of Serena Williams & Venus Williams, who had just won the women's singles crown, met sixteenth-seeded Lisa Raymond, & 2002 champion Samantha Stosur, also in course to play the mixed doubles final in the tournament. The Williams sisters proved to be as dominant through the final as they were during the whole competition, in which they lost no set and knocked out several seeded teams, among them French Open champions Anabel Medina Garrigues & Virginia Ruano Pascual, as Serena & Venus broke twice in each of the sets, saving three break points in the first set, and not facing a single one in the second, to claim the 2008 Wimbledon doubles title after a mere fifty-eight minutes of play, on the score of 6–2, 6–2. The doubles title was Serena & Venus' third in Wimbledon, and the seventh overall together, since the 1999 French Open. The win also marked the third time the sisters won the doubles title of Wimbledon while one of them won the singles title, and the second in which they won the doubles while both of them played the singles final.

- Seeded players out: Serena Williams; Jonas Björkman / Kevin Ullyett; Lisa Raymond / Samantha Stosur.

(Pictures from Day 12)

== Day 13 ==
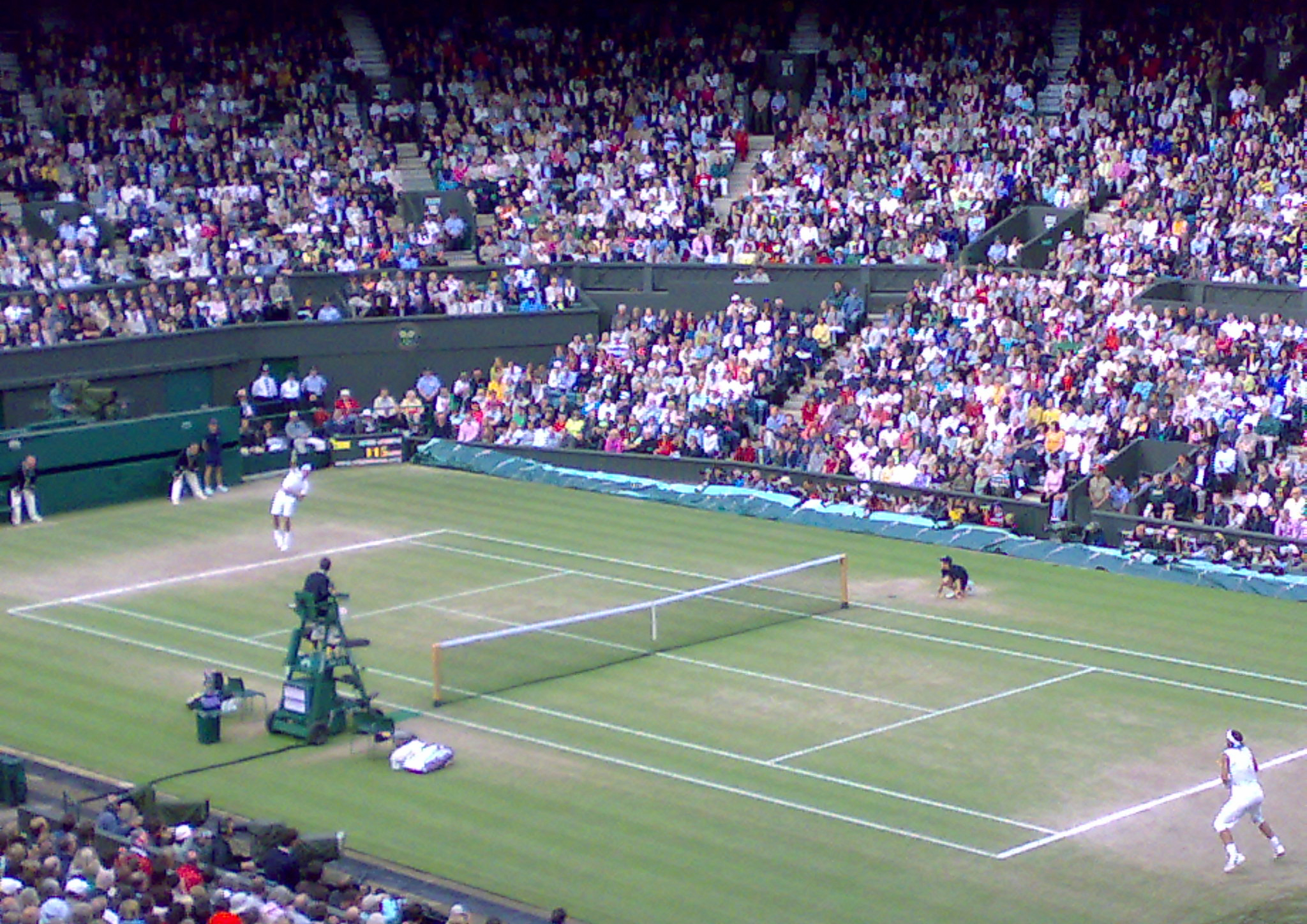
Roger Federer serves to win the third set tie-break.

The final Sunday, featuring the men's singles final, saw Rafael Nadal win the first Wimbledon title of his career and fifth Grand Slam tournament. No. 1 seed and five-time champion Roger Federer was aiming to equal William Renshaw's record of six consecutive Wimbledon titles (1881–1886), and edge ever closer to Pete Sampras's record of 14 Grand Slam titles, of which Federer had 12. Nadal, the No. 2 seed and four-time French Open champion was Federer's challenger for the third consecutive year, and was aiming to become the first man since Björn Borg to win the French Open and Wimbledon in the same year. Nadal's countryman, Manuel Santana, the last Spaniard to have won the Wimbledon title (in 1966), said Nadal could take inspiration from Spain's victory in the recent European Championships, which Spain had last won in 1964.

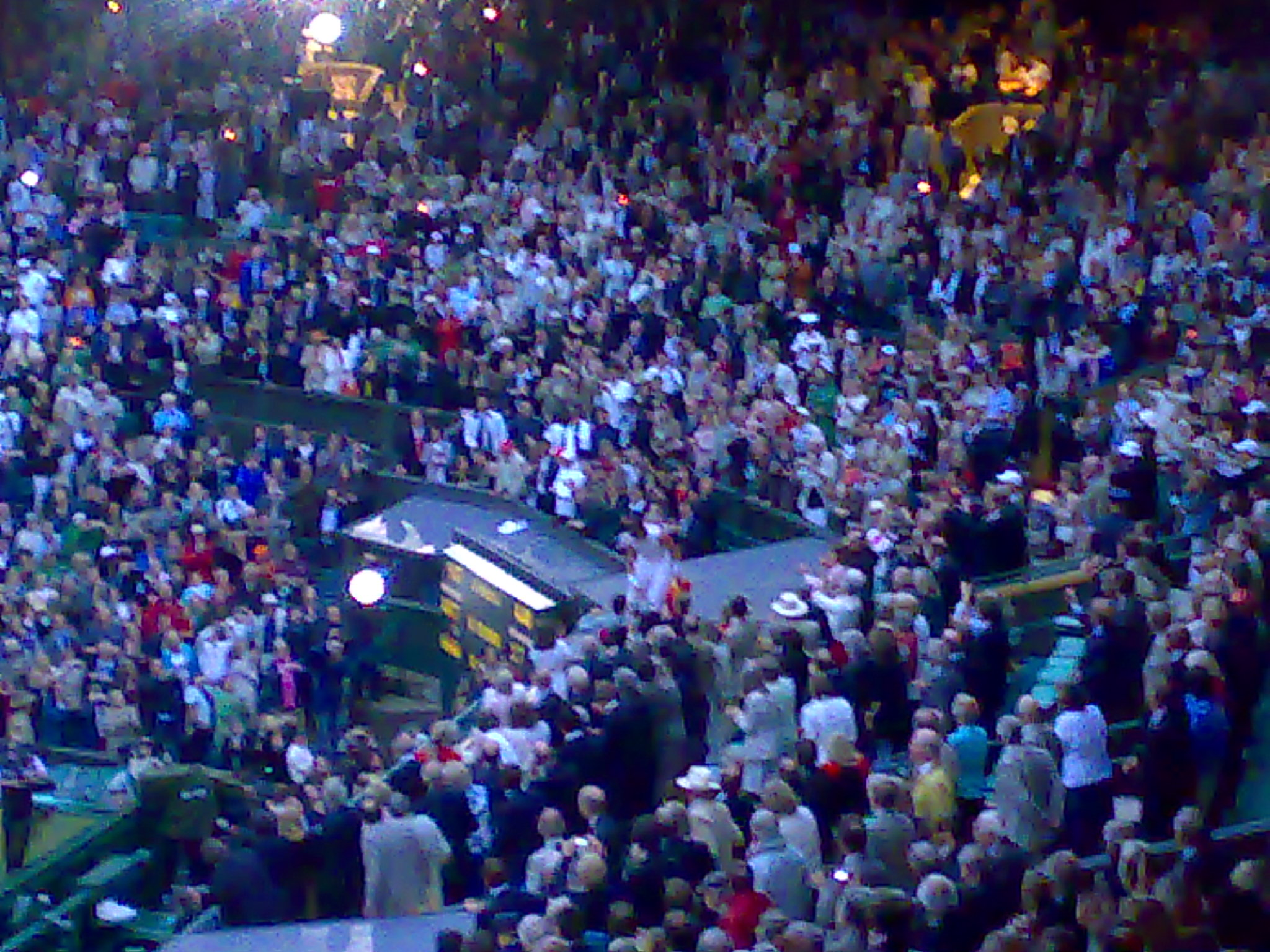
Rafael Nadal climbs over a commentary box roof to receive the congratulations of Felipe, Prince of Asturias and his wife.

Rain and lightning delayed the final, scheduled for 14:00, until 14:35 (UTC+1). The final itself was a fragmented affair, with two rain delays removing the possibility of an uninterrupted final. However, the playing time made it the longest final in Wimbledon history, at four hours and 48 minutes.

Nadal began well, winning the first set 6–4 in just under an hour, and taking the second by the same scoreline, despite having been down 4–1 at one point. The third set was interrupted by rain delays but the players returned to finish the set with a tie break, which Federer won by seven points to five. The fourth mirrored the third by also going to a tie break, in which Nadal took a 5–2 lead. Nadal was on serve but served a double fault and then was forced by Federer into a hitting a backhand into the net. Later in the tie break, Nadal had two championship points, including one on his serve, which he squandered, with Federer triumphing 10–8, and forcing a final set. The fifth set went only four games before another rain delay; the score was 2–2 (40–40) when they returned. Nadal eventually prevailed, winning the final set 9–7, at 21:16 local time. Nadal celebrated his win by climbing to his family in the crowd, including coach Toni Nadal, and then traversed a roofed area to shake hands with members of Spanish royalty. Pundit and three-time Wimbledon champion John McEnroe lauded it as "the greatest match I have ever seen." With a final score of 6–4 6–4 6–7(5) 6–7(8) 9–7.

- Seeded players out: Roger Federer.

The mixed doubles' final was originally scheduled to be played on Centre Court following the conclusion of the men’s singles final. As the latter was suspended due to rain repeatedly and with the risk of daylight running out, the mixed doubles final was moved to a near empty court 1. The Bryan brothers, Bob and Mike, met each other in the second siblings final of this year's tournament. The unseeded Bob and Samantha Stosur won the match in straight sets, 7–5, 6–4 against the first seeded Mike and Katarina Srebotnik, after one hour and one minute.

- Seeded players out: Mike Bryan / Katarina Srebotnik.

(Pictures from Day 13)
