= 2008 Australian Open – Women's singles qualifying =

Women's singles qualifying
- 2008 Australian Open

Events
Singles	men	women		boys	girls
Doubles	men	women	mixed	boys	girls
WC Singles	men	women	quad
WC Doubles	men	women	quad
Legends	men	women	mixed

Qualification
Singles	men	women
- Australian Open

This article displays the qualifying draw for the Women's singles at the 2008 Australian Open.

== Seeds ==
1. (Russia) Ekaterina Bychkova (qualifying competition)
2. (United States) Ahsha Rolle (first round)
3. (United States) Bethanie Mattek (first round)
4. (Germany) Julia Schruff (qualified)
5. (Czech Republic) Iveta Benešová (second round)
6. (Thailand) Tamarine Tanasugarn (qualified)
7. (Hungary) Gréta Arn (first round)
8. (Ukraine) Yuliana Fedak (second round)
9. (Switzerland) Timea Bacsinszky (qualified)
10. (Russia) Evgeniya Rodina (first round)
11. (China) Meng Yuan (qualified)
12. (Hungary) Melinda Czink (second round)
13. (Paraguay) Rossana de los Ríos (second round)
14. (Germany) Julia Görges (second round)
15. (United Kingdom) Katie O'Brien (qualifying competition)
16. (France) Stéphanie Foretz (first round)
17. (Belarus) Anastasiya Yakimova (qualifying competition)
18. (Hungary) Kira Nagy (first round)
19. (Switzerland) Emmanuelle Gagliardi (second round)
20. (United Kingdom) Anne Keothavong (second round)
21. (Slovenia) Andreja Klepač (second round)
22. (Kazakhstan) Galina Voskoboeva (second round)
23. (Canada) Aleksandra Wozniak (first round)
24. (France) Olivia Sanchez (qualifying competition)

== Qualifiers ==
1. (Romania) Monica Niculescu
2. (Germany) Angelika Bachmann
3. (Russia) Ekaterina Ivanova
4. (Germany) Julia Schruff
5. (Russia) Alisa Kleybanova
6. (Thailand) Tamarine Tanasugarn
7. (Chinese Taipei) Hsieh Su-wei
8. (Poland) Marta Domachowska
9. (Switzerland) Timea Bacsinszky
10. (Germany) Sandra Klösel
11. (China) Yuan Meng
12. (Germany) Sabine Lisicki

== Qualifying draw ==
Key

- Q = Qualifier
- WC = Wild card
- LL = Lucky loser
- Alt = Alternate
- ITF = ITF entry
- PR = Protected ranking
- SR = Special ranking
- SE = Special exempt
- JE = Junior exempt
- JR = Junior Accelerator Programme entrant
- CO = College Accelerator Programme entrant
- NG = Next Gen Accelerator Program entrant
- w/o = Walkover
- r = Retired
- d = Defaulted

=== First qualifier ===
First round
1	(Russia) Ekaterina Bychkova	5	6	6
(France) Yulia Fedossova	7	3	4
(Romania) Anda Perianu	4	3
(Japan) Seiko Okamoto	6	6
(Romania) Monica Niculescu	6	7
(Japan) Akiko Yonemura	1	5
(Argentina) Jorgelina Cravero	4	4
20	(United Kingdom) Anne Keothavong	6	6

Second round
1	(Russia) Ekaterina Bychkova	6	6
(Japan) Seiko Okamoto	2	4
(Romania) Monica Niculescu	6	6
20	(United Kingdom) Anne Keothavong	2	4

Qualifying competition
1	(Russia) Ekaterina Bychkova	1	5
(Romania) Monica Niculescu	6	7

=== Second qualifier ===
First round
2	(United States) Ahsha Rolle	4	1
(Chinese Taipei) Hwang I-hsuan	6	6
Alt	(Russia) Arina Rodionova	6	6^{5}	6
(Japan) Shiho Hisamatsu	3	7^{7}	0
(Germany) Angelika Bachmann	6^{4}	6	6
(Switzerland) Stefanie Vögele	7^{7}	3	4
(Chinese Taipei) Chan Chin-wei	1	1
13	(Paraguay) Rossana de los Ríos	6	6

Second round
(Chinese Taipei) Hwang I-hsuan	2	2
Alt	(Russia) Arina Rodionova	6	6
(Germany) Angelika Bachmann	1	6	6
13	(Paraguay) Rossana de los Ríos	6	3	0

Qualifying competition
Alt	(Russia) Arina Rodionova	3	1
(Germany) Angelika Bachmann	6	6

=== Third qualifier ===
First round
3	(United States) Bethanie Mattek	3	6^{3}
(Russia) Ekaterina Ivanova	6	7^{7}
(Japan) Natsumi Hamamura	1	3
(Russia) Alina Jidkova	6	6
(Japan) Kumiko Iijima	2	3
(Spain) Nuria Llagostera Vives	6	6
WC	(Australia) Alison Bai	4	4
19	(Switzerland) Emmanuelle Gagliardi	6	6

Second round
(Russia) Ekaterina Ivanova	6	6
(Russia) Alina Jidkova	3	2
(Spain) Nuria Llagostera Vives	3	6	6
19	(Switzerland) Emmanuelle Gagliardi	6	3	3

Qualifying competition
(Russia) Ekaterina Ivanova	6	4	6
(Spain) Nuria Llagostera Vives	3	6	2

=== Fourth qualifier ===
First round
4	(Germany) Julia Schruff	6	6
WC	(Australia) Karolina Wlodarczak	3	1
(Croatia) Nika Ožegović	6	3	6
(Czech Republic) Petra Kvitová	3	6	4
(Italy) Alberta Brianti	3	2
(Poland) Urszula Radwańska	6	6
(Ukraine) Oxana Lyubtsova	4	6	3
14	(Germany) Julia Görges	6	0	6

Second round
4	(Germany) Julia Schruff	7^{11}	5	7
(Croatia) Nika Ožegović	6^{9}	7	5
(Poland) Urszula Radwańska	7^{10}	7
14	(Germany) Julia Görges	6^{8}	5

Qualifying competition
4	(Germany) Julia Schruff	6	6
(Poland) Urszula Radwańska	3	0

=== Fifth qualifier ===
First round
5	(Czech Republic) Iveta Benešová	7^{7}	6
(Portugal) Neuza Silva	6^{5}	2
(Russia) Alisa Kleybanova	6	6
(Canada) Marie-Ève Pelletier	3	4
(Ukraine) Yuliya Beygelzimer	6	6
(Australia) Emily Hewson	4	3
(Czech Republic) Zuzana Ondrášková	1	4
24	(France) Olivia Sanchez	6	6

Second round
5	(Czech Republic) Iveta Benešová	3	1
(Russia) Alisa Kleybanova	6	6
(Ukraine) Yuliya Beygelzimer	5	6	3
24	(France) Olivia Sanchez	7	4	6

Qualifying competition
(Russia) Alisa Kleybanova	6	6
24	(France) Olivia Sanchez	0	4

=== Sixth qualifier ===
First round
6	(Thailand) Tamarine Tanasugarn	6	3	6
(United Kingdom) Melanie South	3	6	2
(New Zealand) Marina Erakovic	4	1
WC	(Australia) Jelena Dokic	6	6
(United Kingdom) Elena Baltacha	6	3
(France) Virginie Pichet	0	2^{r}
(China) Zhang Shuai	2	6	6
16	(France) Stéphanie Foretz	6	2	3

Second round
6	(Thailand) Tamarine Tanasugarn	6	6
WC	(Australia) Jelena Dokic	2	1
(United Kingdom) Elena Baltacha	4	1
(China) Zhang Shuai	6	6

Qualifying competition
6	(Thailand) Tamarine Tanasugarn	3	6	6
(China) Zhang Shuai	6	3	3

=== Seventh qualifier ===
First round
7	(Hungary) Gréta Arn	6	2	4
(Chinese Taipei) Hsieh Su-wei	1	6	6
(Germany) Angelika Rösch	6^{6}	4
(Czech Republic) Barbora Záhlavová-Strýcová	7^{8}	6
(Slovenia) Maša Zec Peškirič	6	6
WC	(Australia) Olivia Rogowska	2	2
(Belarus) Ekaterina Dzehalevich	2	3
21	(Slovenia) Andreja Klepač	6	6

Second round
(Chinese Taipei) Hsieh Su-wei	6	7^{7}
(Czech Republic) Barbora Záhlavová-Strýcová	0	6^{3}
(Slovenia) Maša Zec Peškirič	3	6	6
21	(Slovenia) Andreja Klepač	6	3	4

Qualifying competition
(Chinese Taipei) Hsieh Su-wei	6	6
(Slovenia) Maša Zec Peškirič	4	0

=== Eighth qualifier ===
First round
8	(Ukraine) Yuliana Fedak	6	6
(Croatia) Ivana Lisjak	0	2
(Japan) Ayumi Morita	6	7^{7}
WC	(Australia) Isabella Holland	0	6^{3}
(Spain) Carla Suárez Navarro	6	6
(Japan) Rika Fujiwara	2	4
(Poland) Marta Domachowska	6	6
18	(Hungary) Kira Nagy	1	2

Second round
8	(Ukraine) Yuliana Fedak	5	3
(Japan) Ayumi Morita	7	6
(Spain) Carla Suárez Navarro	0	2
(Poland) Marta Domachowska	6	6

Qualifying competition
(Japan) Ayumi Morita	3	4
(Poland) Marta Domachowska	6	6

=== Ninth qualifier ===
First round
9	(Switzerland) Timea Bacsinszky	6	6
(Czech Republic) Lucie Hradecká	2	1
(Russia) Anastasia Pavlyuchenkova	3	6	6
(France) Violette Huck	6	1	2
(Russia) Anna Lapushchenkova	6^{3}	6	2
(Estonia) Margit Rüütel	7^{7}	2	6
(Tunisia) Selima Sfar	6^{7}	2
22	(Kazakhstan) Galina Voskoboeva	7^{9}	6

Second round
9	(Switzerland) Timea Bacsinszky	6	4	6
(Russia) Anastasia Pavlyuchenkova	1	6	4
(Estonia) Margit Rüütel	2	6	6
22	(Kazakhstan) Galina Voskoboeva	6	4	3

Qualifying competition
9	(Switzerland) Timea Bacsinszky	3	6	6
(Estonia) Margit Rüütel	6	1	1

=== Tenth qualifier ===
First round
10	(Russia) Evgeniya Rodina	1	3
(Japan) Junri Namigata	6	6
(Germany) Sandra Klösel	6	6
(Russia) Vasilisa Bardina	3	1
WC	(Australia) Brittany Sheed	2	3
(Russia) Vesna Manasieva	6	6
(Spain) María José Martínez Sánchez	3	6	6
23	(Canada) Aleksandra Wozniak	6	4	3

Second round
(Japan) Junri Namigata	6	1	0
(Germany) Sandra Klösel	2	6	6
(Russia) Vesna Manasieva	6^{6}	7^{7}	6
(Spain) María José Martínez Sánchez	7^{8}	6^{5}	1

Qualifying competition
(Germany) Sandra Klösel	6	3	8
(Russia) Vesna Manasieva	2	6	6

=== Eleventh qualifier ===
First round
11	(China) Yuan Meng	6	6
WC	(New Zealand) Sacha Jones	1	4
(Japan) Yurika Sema	3	6	1
(Czech Republic) Eva Hrdinová	6	3	6
(Indonesia) Sandy Gumulya	2	1
(Belgium) Yanina Wickmayer	6	6
(Russia) Darya Kustova	3	0^{r}
15	(United Kingdom) Katie O'Brien	6	1

Second round
11	(China) Yuan Meng	1	6	6
(Czech Republic) Eva Hrdinová	6	1	2
(Belgium) Yanina Wickmayer	6	3	6
15	(United Kingdom) Katie O'Brien	4	6	8

Qualifying competition
11	(China) Yuan Meng	6	6
(United Kingdom) Katie O'Brien	4	2

=== Twelfth qualifier ===
First round
12	(Hungary) Melinda Czink	6	7
(Australia) Trudi Musgrave	2	5
WC	(Australia) Sally Peers	0	1
(Germany) Sabine Lisicki	6	6
(South Korea) Lee Ye-ra	6	7
(France) Julie Coin	1	5
(Slovakia) Stanislava Hrozenská	6	4	3
17	(Belarus) Anastasiya Yakimova	4	6	6

Second round
12	(Hungary) Melinda Czink	7^{7}	0	2
(Germany) Sabine Lisicki	6^{4}	6	6
(South Korea) Lee Ye-ra	1	6^{6}
17	(Belarus) Anastasiya Yakimova	6	7^{8}

Qualifying competition
(Germany) Sabine Lisicki	6	6
17	(Belarus) Anastasiya Yakimova	2	1
