= 2010 Australian Open – Women's singles qualifying =

Women's singles qualifying
- 2010 Australian Open

Events
Singles	men	women		boys	girls
Doubles	men	women	mixed	boys	girls
WC Singles	men	women	quad
WC Doubles	men	women	quad
Legends	men	women	mixed

Qualification
Singles	men	women
- Australian Open

The 2010 Australian Open was a tennis tournament that took place in Melbourne Park in Melbourne, Australia, from 18 to 31 January. It was the 98th edition of the Australian Open, and the first Grand Slam event of the year.

== Seeds ==
1. (Belgium) Yanina Wickmayer (Qualifier)
2. (Russia) Regina Kulikova (Qualifier)
3. (United States) Shenay Perry (Qualifier)
4. (Portugal) Michelle Larcher de Brito (first round)
5. (Italy) Maria Elena Camerin (qualifying competition)
6. (Netherlands) Arantxa Rus (first round)
7. (Germany) Angelique Kerber (Qualifier)
8. (Austria) Yvonne Meusburger (Qualifier)
9. (Ukraine) Mariya Koryttseva (second round)
10. (Belarus) Darya Kustova (first round)
11. (Slovenia) Maša Zec Peškirič (qualifying competition)
12. (Germany) Kathrin Wörle (Qualifier)
13. (Canada) Sharon Fichman (second round)
14. (Czech Republic) Renata Voráčová (Qualifier)
15. (France) Mathilde Johansson (first round)
16. (South Africa) Chanelle Scheepers (first round)
17. (Russia) Ksenia Pervak (qualifying competition)
18. (Netherlands) Michaëlla Krajicek (qualifying competition)
19. (Germany) Julia Schruff (qualifying competition)
20. (Russia) Vesna Manasieva (qualifying competition)
21. (Canada) Valérie Tétreault (Qualifier)
22. (Spain) Lourdes Domínguez Lino (qualifying competition)
23. (United States) Lilia Osterloh (second round)
24. (Poland) Marta Domachowska (first round)

== Qualifiers ==
1. (Belgium) Yanina Wickmayer
2. (Russia) Regina Kulikova
3. (United States) Shenay Perry
4. (China) Han Xinyun
5. (Czech Republic) Renata Voráčová
6. (Sweden) Sofia Arvidsson
7. (Germany) Angelique Kerber
8. (Austria) Yvonne Meusburger
9. (Ukraine) Yuliana Fedak
10. (Slovakia) Zuzana Kučová
11. (Canada) Valérie Tétreault
12. (Germany) Kathrin Wörle

== Qualifying draw ==
Key

- Q = Qualifier
- WC = Wild card
- LL = Lucky loser
- Alt = Alternate
- ITF = ITF entry
- PR = Protected ranking
- SR = Special ranking
- SE = Special exempt
- JE = Junior exempt
- JR = Junior Accelerator Programme entrant
- CO = College Accelerator Programme entrant
- NG = Next Gen Accelerator Program entrant
- w/o = Walkover
- r = Retired
- d = Defaulted

=== First qualifier ===
First round
1	(Belgium) Yanina Wickmayer	4	6	7
(Japan) Yurika Sema	6	0	5
(Russia) Alexandra Panova	6	6^{3}	3
(United Kingdom) Naomi Cavaday	3	7	6
WC	(Australia) Marija Mirkovic	4	3
(Russia) Arina Rodionova	6	6
(Czech Republic) Eva Hrdinová	7	1	3
22	(Spain) Lourdes Domínguez Lino	5	6	6

Second round
1	(Belgium) Yanina Wickmayer	6	6
(United Kingdom) Naomi Cavaday	0	1
(Russia) Arina Rodionova	3	5
22	(Spain) Lourdes Domínguez Lino	6	7

Qualifying competition
1	(Belgium) Yanina Wickmayer	6	6
22	(Spain) Lourdes Domínguez Lino	0	0

=== Second qualifier ===
First round
2	(Russia) Regina Kulikova	6	6
(United States) Lindsay Lee-Waters	1	1
(Kyrgyzstan) Ksenia Palkina	4	3
(Japan) Ryōko Fuda	6	6
(Slovakia) Lenka Wienerová	5	6^{4}
(Japan) Kurumi Nara	7	7
(Hungary) Anikó Kapros	2	4
17	(Russia) Ksenia Pervak	6	6

Second round
2	(Russia) Regina Kulikova	6	1	6
(Japan) Ryōko Fuda	3	6	1
(Japan) Kurumi Nara	4	3
17	(Russia) Ksenia Pervak	6	6

Qualifying competition
2	(Russia) Regina Kulikova	7	6
17	(Russia) Ksenia Pervak	6^{3}	1

=== Third qualifier ===
First round
3	(United States) Shenay Perry	6	6
(United Kingdom) Melanie South	3	3
(Croatia) Ivana Lisjak	6	2	6
(Russia) Elena Chalova	4	6	4
(Japan) Misaki Doi	1	2
(United States) Carly Gullickson	6	6
WC	(Australia) Shannon Golds	2	3
20	(Russia) Vesna Manasieva	6	6

Second round
3	(United States) Shenay Perry	6	7
(Croatia) Ivana Lisjak	4	5
(United States) Carly Gullickson	2	4
20	(Russia) Vesna Manasieva	6	6

Qualifying competition
3	(United States) Shenay Perry	3	6	6
20	(Russia) Vesna Manasieva	6	4	2

=== Fourth qualifier ===
First round
4	(Portugal) Michelle Larcher de Brito	3	0
(Belarus) Ekaterina Dzehalevich	6	6
WC	(Australia) Jessica Moore	4	4
(China) Han Xinyun	6	6
(Georgia (country)) Margalita Chakhnashvili	2	3
(Georgia (country)) Oksana Kalashnikova	6	6
(Russia) Anastasia Pivovarova	6	6
16	(South Africa) Chanelle Scheepers	4	2

Second round
(Belarus) Ekaterina Dzehalevich	5	2
(China) Han Xinyun	7	6
(Georgia (country)) Oksana Kalashnikova	2	5
(Russia) Anastasia Pivovarova	6	7

Qualifying competition
(China) Han Xinyun	7	1	6
(Russia) Anastasia Pivovarova	6^{4}	6	4

=== Fifth qualifier ===
First round
5	(Italy) Maria Elena Camerin	6	6
(Czech Republic) Zuzana Ondrášková	4	2
(Russia) Anna Lapushchenkova	2	6	3
(Canada) Heidi El Tabakh	6	1	6
(Spain) Nuria Llagostera Vives	7	6
(United States) Madison Brengle	6^{1}	3
WC	(Australia) Viktorija Rajicic	1	4
14	(Czech Republic) Renata Voráčová	6	6

Second round
5	(Italy) Maria Elena Camerin	6	6
(Canada) Heidi El Tabakh	3	3
(Spain) Nuria Llagostera Vives	4	3
14	(Czech Republic) Renata Voráčová	6	6

Qualifying competition
5	(Italy) Maria Elena Camerin	6^{2}	6	1
14	(Czech Republic) Renata Voráčová	7	0	6

=== Sixth qualifier ===
First round
6	(Netherlands) Arantxa Rus	4	6	2
(Ukraine) Kristina Antoniychuk	6	4	6
(Italy) Anna Floris	6	6
WC	(Australia) Ashling Sumner	0	1
(Spain) Eloisa Compostizo de Andrés	2	4
(Hungary) Katalin Marosi	6	6
(Sweden) Sofia Arvidsson	6	4	7
24	(Poland) Marta Domachowska	2	6	5

Second round
(Ukraine) Kristina Antoniychuk	5	6^{6}
(Italy) Anna Floris	7	7
(Hungary) Katalin Marosi	3	5
(Sweden) Sofia Arvidsson	6	7

Qualifying competition
(Italy) Anna Floris	6	4	2
(Sweden) Sofia Arvidsson	3	6	6

=== Seventh qualifier ===
First round
7	(Germany) Angelique Kerber	6	4	6
(Canada) Rebecca Marino	1	6	2
(United States) Alexandra Stevenson	6^{7}	1^{r}
(Czech Republic) Andrea Hlaváčková	7	3
WC	(United Kingdom) Laura Robson	6	2	6
(Australia) Sophie Ferguson	4	6	4
(France) Claire Feuerstein	3	2
18	(Netherlands) Michaëlla Krajicek	6	6

Second round
7	(Germany) Angelique Kerber	6	6
(Czech Republic) Andrea Hlaváčková	2	3
WC	(United Kingdom) Laura Robson	4	6^{7}
18	(Netherlands) Michaëlla Krajicek	6	7

Qualifying competition
7	(Germany) Angelique Kerber	7	3	6
18	(Netherlands) Michaëlla Krajicek	5	6	4

=== Eighth qualifier ===
First round
8	(Austria) Yvonne Meusburger	7	6
(United States) Julia Cohen	6^{4}	1
(Portugal) Neuza Silva	1	3
(Greece) Eleni Daniilidou	6	6
(United States) Bethanie Mattek-Sands	2	6	6
(Ukraine) Julia Vakulenko	6	3	4
(France) Séverine Beltrame	2	4
13	(Canada) Sharon Fichman	6	6

Second round
8	(Austria) Yvonne Meusburger	6	6
(Greece) Eleni Daniilidou	1	4
(United States) Bethanie Mattek-Sands	6	3	6
13	(Canada) Sharon Fichman	2	6	1

Qualifying competition
8	(Austria) Yvonne Meusburger	3	7	6
(United States) Bethanie Mattek-Sands	6	5	4

=== Ninth qualifier ===
First round
9	(Ukraine) Mariya Koryttseva	6	6
(Ukraine) Olga Savchuk	3	4
(Ukraine) Yuliana Fedak	5	6	6
(Spain) Sílvia Soler Espinosa	7	3	2
(Italy) Corinna Dentoni	6	6
(France) Yulia Fedossova	4	3
(France) Kristina Mladenovic	6	6
15	(France) Mathilde Johansson	1	3

Second round
9	(Ukraine) Mariya Koryttseva	2	6	2
(Ukraine) Yuliana Fedak	6	3	6
(Italy) Corinna Dentoni	2	6	3
(France) Kristina Mladenovic	6	4	6

Qualifying competition
(Ukraine) Yuliana Fedak	7	7
(France) Kristina Mladenovic	6^{8}	6^{4}

=== Tenth qualifier ===
First round
10	(Belarus) Darya Kustova	7	5	5
(Slovakia) Zuzana Kučová	6^{4}	7	7
(Russia) Nina Bratchikova	6	6
(Japan) Tomoko Yonemura	3	4
(Russia) Elena Bovina	6	6
WC	(Australia) Sally Peers	2	2
(China) Zhang Shuai	0	1
19	(Germany) Julia Schruff	6	6

Second round
(Slovakia) Zuzana Kučová	6	4	6
(Russia) Nina Bratchikova	1	6	4
(Russia) Elena Bovina	3	4
19	(Germany) Julia Schruff	6	6

Qualifying competition
(Slovakia) Zuzana Kučová	6	6
19	(Germany) Julia Schruff	4	4

=== Eleventh qualifier ===
First round
11	(Slovenia) Maša Zec Peškirič	6	2	6
(Japan) Rika Fujiwara	4	6	1
(Japan) Junri Namigata	4	1
(Russia) Ekaterina Ivanova	6	6
(Austria) Nikola Hofmanova	7	6
(Australia) Monique Adamczak	5	1
(France) Camille Pin	3	2
21	(Canada) Valérie Tétreault	6	6

Second round
11	(Slovenia) Maša Zec Peškirič	7	7
(Russia) Ekaterina Ivanova	6^{4}	6^{6}
(Austria) Nikola Hofmanova	1	6	3
21	(Canada) Valérie Tétreault	6	3	6

Qualifying competition
11	(Slovenia) Maša Zec Peškirič	3	3
21	(Canada) Valérie Tétreault	6	6

=== Twelfth qualifier ===
First round
12	(Germany) Kathrin Wörle	6	6
(Georgia (country)) Anna Tatishvili	1	3
(France) Stéphanie Foretz	6	4	6
(Romania) Simona Halep	4	6	4
WC	(Australia) Monika Wejnert	3	6	2
(Serbia) Bojana Jovanovski	6	4	6
(United States) Lauren Albanese	1	4
23	(United States) Lilia Osterloh	6	6

Second round
12	(Germany) Kathrin Wörle	6	7
(France) Stéphanie Foretz	3	6^{4}
(Serbia) Bojana Jovanovski	7	6
23	(United States) Lilia Osterloh	5	2

Qualifying competition
12	(Germany) Kathrin Wörle	6	4	9
(Serbia) Bojana Jovanovski	2	6	7
