= 2010 Australian Open – Boys' singles =

Boys' singles
- 2010 Australian Open

Final
- Champion: (Brazil) Tiago Fernandes
- Runner-up: (Australia) Sean Berman
- Score: 7–5, 6–3

Events
Singles	men	women		boys	girls
Doubles	men	women	mixed	boys	girls
WC Singles	men	women	quad
WC Doubles	men	women	quad
Legends	men	women	mixed
- Australian Open

Yuki Bhambri was the defending champion, but did not compete in the Juniors this year.

The boys' singles tournament of the 2010 Australian Open started in the week of 25 January, the second week of the main tournament. Tiago Fernandes won in the final 7–5, 6–3, against Sean Berman.

== Seeds ==
1. (Sweden) Daniel Berta (third round)
2. (France) Gianni Mina (semifinals)
3. (Australia) Jason Kubler (third round)
4. (United States) Mitchell Frank (third round)
5. (Chinese Taipei) Huang Liang-chi (second round)
6. (Hungary) Márton Fucsovics (semifinals)
7. (Germany) Kevin Krawietz (first round)
8. (Germany) Dominik Schulz (second round)
9. (Slovakia) Filip Horanský (third round)
10. (Brazil) Guilherme Clézar (quarterfinals)
11. (Argentina) Renzo Olivo (third round)
12. (Japan) Yasutaka Uchiyama (first round)
13. (Belgium) Arthur de Greef (third round)
14. (Brazil) Tiago Fernandes (champion)
15. (Finland) Henri Laaksonen (first round)
16. (Slovakia) Jozef Kovalík (second round)

Note: Daniel Berta was, at the end of 2009, ranked world no. 1 among the juniors, but forgot to apply for a place in the tournament; he was given a wild card for the qualification round, through which he qualified for the main tournament.

== Draw ==
Key

- Q = Qualifier
- WC = Wild card
- LL = Lucky loser
- Alt = Alternate
- ITF = ITF entry
- PR = Protected ranking
- SR = Special ranking
- SE = Special exempt
- JE = Junior exempt
- JR = Junior Accelerator Programme entrant
- CO = College Accelerator Programme entrant
- NG = Next Gen Accelerator Program entrant
- w/o = Walkover
- r = Retired
- d = Defaulted

=== Finals ===
Quarterfinals
WC	(Australia) Benjamin Mitchell	1	2
6	(Hungary) Márton Fucsovics	6	6
WC	(Australia) Sean Berman	6	6
10	(Brazil) Guilherme Clézar	4	2
(South Korea) Jeong Suk-young	6^{4}	5
14	(Brazil) Tiago Fernandes	7	7
WC	(Australia) James Duckworth	2	4
2/WC	(France) Gianni Mina	6	6

Semifinals
6	(Hungary) Márton Fucsovics	6^{5}	3
WC	(Australia) Sean Berman	7	6
14	(Brazil) Tiago Fernandes	4	7	6
2/WC	(France) Gianni Mina	6	6^{5}	2

Final
WC	(Australia) Sean Berman	5	3
14	(Brazil) Tiago Fernandes	7	6

=== Top half ===
==== Section 1 ====
First round
1/Q	(Sweden) Daniel Berta	7	2	8
Q	(Australia) Jarryd Chaplin	5	6	6
(New Zealand) Barrett Franks	3	7	6
(Spain) Carlos Boluda-Purkiss	6	6^{4}	2
(Czech Republic) Jiří Veselý	2	6	6
(France) Mick Lescure	6	2	2
WC	(Australia) Benjamin Mitchell	6	6
15	(Finland) Henri Laaksonen	3	1
11	(Argentina) Renzo Olivo	6	5	6
(United Kingdom) Tom Allen	2	7	1
Q	(South Korea) Na Jung-woong	6	6
(Poland) Bartosz Sawicki	3	4
(United States) Nick Chappell	3	1
WC	(Australia) Ben Wagland	6	6
(Russia) Alexander Rumyantsev	1	0
6	(Hungary) Márton Fucsovics	6	6

Second round
1/Q	(Sweden) D Berta	7	6
(New Zealand) B Franks	5	2
(Czech Republic) J Veselý	3	6	3
WC	(Australia) B Mitchell	6	3	6
11	(Argentina) R Olivo	6	7
Q	(South Korea) J-w Na	4	6^{1}
(Australia) B Wagland	6	2	4
6	(Hungary) M Fucsovics	2	6	6

Third round
1/Q	(Sweden) D Berta	2	1
WC	(Australia) B Mitchell	6	6
11	(Argentina) R Olivo	3	3
6	(Hungary) M Fucsovics	6	6

Quarterfinals
WC	(Australia) B Mitchell	1	2
6	(Hungary) M Fucsovics	6	6

==== Section 2 ====
First round
3	(Australia) Jason Kubler	6	7
(China) Wang Chuhan	3	5
(Netherlands) Jannick Lupescu	7	7
(Latvia) Arturs Kazijevs	5	5
WC	(Australia) Sean Berman	5	6	6
(New Zealand) Sebastian Lavie	7	4	2
(Russia) Richard Muzaev	4	3
16	(Slovakia) Jozef Kovalík	6	6
10	(Brazil) Guilherme Clézar	6	6
(United Kingdom) Jack Carpenter	2	4
(Mexico) Alexis Carlos	1	4
WC	(Australia) Maverick Banes	6	6
(France) Romain Arneodo	5	2
Q	(Sweden) Kalle Averfalk	7	6
(Republic of Ireland) John Morrissey	1	1
8	(Germany) Dominik Schulz	6	6

Second round
3	(Australia) J Kubler	6	6
(Netherlands) J Lupescu	2	4
WC	(Australia) S Berman	6	3	6
16	(Slovakia) J Kovalík	1	6	4
10	(Brazil) G Clézar	6	6
WC	(Australia) M Banes	4	3
Q	(Sweden) K Averfalk	4	7	8
8	(Germany) D Schulz	6	5	6

Third round
3	(Australia) J Kubler	4	2
WC	(Australia) S Berman	6	6
10	(Brazil) G Clézar	6	7
Q	(Sweden) K Averfalk	2	6^{3}

Quarterfinals
WC	(Australia) S Berman	6	6
10	(Brazil) G Clézar	4	2

=== Bottom half ===
==== Section 3 ====
First round
7	(Germany) Kevin Krawietz	1	3
(South Korea) Jeong Suk-young	6	6
(Netherlands) Justin Eleveld	6	6
(Finland) Micke Kontinen	1	0
WC	(Australia) Joey Swaysland	6	6
(Canada) Pavel Krainik	2	3
(New Zealand) Ben McLachlan	6	1	7
9	(Slovakia) Filip Horanský	3	6	9
14	(Brazil) Tiago Fernandes	3	6	6
(France) Cédrick Commin	6	3	4
(Sweden) Tobias Blömgren	6	6
(South Africa) Hernus Pieters	1	1
Q	(Poland) Maciej Smoła	1	6	1
(Tunisia) Slim Hamza	6	4	6
WC	(Australia) Jay Andrijic	2	1
4	(United States) Mitchell Frank	6	6

Second round
(South Korea) S-y Jeong	6	6
(Netherlands) J Eleveld	3	2
WC	(Australia) J Swaysland	3	2
9	(Slovakia) F Horanský	6	6
14	(Brazil) T Fernandes	7	6
(Sweden) T Blömgren	5	2
(Tunisia) S Hamza	3	6	1
4	(United States) M Frank	6	4	6

Third round
(South Korea) S-y Jeong	6	6
9	(Slovakia) F Horanský	0	2
14	(Brazil) T Fernandes	6	4	7
4	(United States) M Frank	3	6	5

Quarterfinals
(South Korea) S-y Jeong	6^{4}	5
14	(Brazil) T Fernandes	7	7

==== Section 4 ====
First round
5	(Chinese Taipei) Huang Liang-chi	2	6	6
(Philippines) Francis Casey Alcantara	6	3	4
(Czech Republic) Robert Rumler	1	4
WC	(Australia) James Duckworth	6	6
(Russia) Victor Baluda	7	4	3
(Republic of Ireland) Sam Barry	6^{4}	6	6
(United Kingdom) Oliver Golding	6	6
12	(Japan) Yasutaka Uchiyama	4	4
13	(Belgium) Arthur de Greef	6	7
(India) Vaidik Munshaw	4	6^{6}
(Australia) Luke Saville	6	3	9
Q	(South Korea) Lee Jea-moon	1	6	7
Q	(Sweden) Robin Olin	6	6^{3}	6
Q	(Latvia) Miķelis Lībietis	4	7	1
(Italy) Matteo Civarolo	3	0
2/WC	(France) Gianni Mina	6	6

Second round
5	(Chinese Taipei) L-c Huang	6^{3}	4
WC	(Australia) J Duckworth	7	6
(Republic of Ireland) S Barry	7	3	4
(United Kingdom) O Golding	6^{8}	6	6
13	(Belgium) A de Greef	6	4	6
(Australia) L Saville	4	6	4
Q	(Sweden) R Olin	6	3	0
2/WC	(France) G Mina	4	6	6

Third round
WC	(Australia) J Duckworth	7	7
(United Kingdom) O Golding	6^{6}	5
13	(Belgium) A de Greef	6	1	0
2/WC	(France) G Mina	3	6	6

Quarterfinals
WC	(Australia) J Duckworth	2	4
2/WC	(France) G Mina	6	6
