= Finn Tearney =

New Zealand tennis player

- Full name: Finn Tearney
- Country (sports): New Zealand
- Residence: Wellington, New Zealand
- Born: 27 September 1990 (age 35) Auckland, New Zealand
- Height: 1.83 m (6 ft 0 in)
- Plays: Right-handed (two handed-backhand)
- College: Pepperdine University (2009–2013)
- Coach: William Ward and Clint Packer
- Prize money: $71,496

Singles
- Career record: 3-4 (at ATP Tour level, Grand Slam level, and in Davis Cup)
- Career titles: 0
- Highest ranking: No. 356 (10 October 2016)

Grand Slam singles results
- Australian Open Junior: 1R (2008)

Doubles
- Career record: 0–3 (at ATP Tour level, Grand Slam level, and in Davis Cup)
- Career titles: 0
- Highest ranking: No. 402 (8 February 2016)

Grand Slam doubles results
- Australian Open Junior: 2R (2008)

Finn Tearney (born 27 September 1990) is a tennis player from New Zealand.

Tearney has a career high ATP singles ranking of No. 356 achieved on 10 October 2016 and a career high ATP doubles ranking of No. 402 achieved on 8 February 2016.

He has won two ITF Futures singles titles and six ITF Futures doubles titles.

Tearney made his ATP main draw debut at the 2015 Heineken Open, where he received a wildcard into the doubles competition, partnering Wesley Whitehouse. He made his ATP singles main draw debut at the 2016 ASB Classic.

He has become very much a part-time player on the professional circuit as he continues his academic career at Durham University in England, but returned to New Zealand in December 2018 to successfully defend his New Zealand title.

== Career ==
Winning the New Zealand championships gained Tearney a wild card entry into the qualifying draw for the 2019 ASB Classic, where he lost in the first round to Thomas Fabbiano. A few weeks later he was in Portugal where, in an epic match with more than a dozen rallies of twenty shots or more, he beat Jacob Grills in the final of the ITF Futures tournament in Vale do Lobo.

Tearney was called up to the New Zealand Davis Cup team in March 2020 for their tie against Venezuela, despite no longer playing tennis professionally and working for a property development company, and defeated Jordi Muñoz Abreu in the first singles rubber in straight sets 6–4 6–4.

== Challenger & ITF Tour Finals ==
=== Singles: 4 (2 titles, 2 runners-up) ===
Legend
ATP Challenger Tour (0–0)
ITF Futures (2–2)

Result	Date	Category	Tournament	Surface	Opponent in the final	Score
Runner–up	5 April 2015	Futures	Tarakan, Indonesia F1	Hard (i)	(Indonesia) Christopher Rungkat	6–7^{(2–7)}, 6–1, 1–6
Winner	11 October 2015	Futures	Cairns, Australia F7	Clay	(Australia) Alex Bolt	6–7^{(5–7)}, 6–3, 6–3
Runner–up	18 October 2015	Futures	Toowoomba, Australia F8	Hard	(Czech Republic) Robin Staněk	2–6, 2–6
Winner	24 February 2019	Futures	Vale do Lobo, Portugal F1	Hard	(Australia) Jacob Grills	6–2, 2–6, 6–4

=== Doubles: 11 (6 titles, 5 runners-up) ===
Legend
ATP Challenger Tour (0–0)
ITF Futures (6–5)

Result	Date	Category	Tournament	Surface	Partner	Opponents in the final	Score
Winner	20 July 2013	Futures	Istanbul, Turkey F28	Hard	(Puerto Rico) Alex Llompart	(Turkey) Tuna Altuna (Romania) Costin Paval	6–2, 2–6, [10–2]
Winner	27 July 2013	Futures	Istanbul, Turkey F29	Hard	(Puerto Rico) Alex Llompart	(Turkey) Tuna Altuna (Turkey) Baris Erguden	6–4, 6–1
Runner–up	20 October 2013	Futures	Quintana Roo, Mexico F15	Hard	(Puerto Rico) Alex Llompart	(Mexico) César Ramírez (Japan) Kaichi Uchida	6–7^{(5–7)}, 4–6
Runner–up	27 October 2013	Futures	Quintana Roo, Mexico F16	Hard	(Puerto Rico) Alex Llompart	(Venezuela) Luis David Martinez (Venezuela) Roberto Maytín	3–6, 4–6
Runner–up	3 November 2013	Futures	Quintana Roo, Mexico F17	Hard	(Puerto Rico) Alex Llompart	(Canada) Hugo Di Feo (Canada) Brayden Schnur	4–6, 7–5, [8–10]
Runner–up	4 April 2014	Futures	Tsukuba, Japan F4	Hard	(South Korea) Lee Duck-hee	(Japan) Sho Katayama (Japan) Bumpei Sato	4–6, 4–6
Winner	5 April 2015	Futures	Tarakan, Indonesia F1	Hard (i)	(United States) Matt Seeberger	(Japan) Toshihide Matsui (Indonesia) Christopher Rungkat	6–2, 1–6, [10–8]
Winner	14 June 2015	Futures	Charlottesville, United States F16B	Hard	(United States) Hunter Nicholas	(United States) Gonzales Austin (United States) Max Schnur	6–3, 6–2
Winner	26 July 2015	Futures	Vancouver, Canada F5	Hard	(United States) Andre Dome	(United States) Hunter Nicholas (United States) Max Schnur	6–4, 6–4
Runner–up	11 October 2015	Futures	Cairns, Australia F7	Clay	(Japan) Yusuke Watanuki	(China) Gao Xin (China) Li Zhe	1–6, 2–6
Winner	15 November 2015	Futures	Wollongong, Australia F10	Hard	(Australia) Maverick Banes	(Australia) Steven de Waard (Australia) Marc Polmans	6–7^{(6–8)}, 7–5, [10–6]
