= 2008 Australian Open – Wheelchair women's singles =

Wheelchair women's singles
- 2008 Australian Open

Final
- Champion: (Netherlands) Esther Vergeer
- Runner-up: (Netherlands) Korie Homan
- Score: 6–3, 6–3

Events
Singles	men	women		boys	girls
Doubles	men	women	mixed	boys	girls
WC Singles	men	women	quad
WC Doubles	men	women	quad
Legends	men	women	mixed
- Australian Open

The 2008 Australian Open – Wheelchair women's singles was one of the events in wheelchair tennis at the 2008 Australian Open. Two-time defending champion Esther Vergeer defeated fellow Dutch player Korie Homan in the final, 6–3, 6–3, to win the title. It was Vergeer's third consecutive Australian Open singles title and part of her long-standing dominance in women's wheelchair tennis.

== Draw ==
Key

- Q = Qualifier
- WC = Wild card
- LL = Lucky loser
- Alt = Alternate
- ITF = ITF entry
- PR = Protected ranking
- SR = Special ranking
- SE = Special exempt
- JE = Junior exempt
- JR = Junior Accelerator Programme entrant
- CO = College Accelerator Programme entrant
- NG = Next Gen Accelerator Program entrant
- w/o = Walkover
- r = Retired
- d = Defaulted

=== Finals ===
First round
(Netherlands) Esther Vergeer	6	6
(South Korea) Park Ju-Yeon	0	0
(Japan) Mie Yaosa	6	6
(Australia) Nicole Harrison	0	0
(Netherlands) Sharon Walraven	6	6
(Netherlands) Maaike Smit	0	3
(France) Florence Gravellier	7	6
(United States) Kaitlyn Verfuerth	5	2
(United Kingdom) Lucy Shuker	6	6
(Israel) Illanit Fridman	2	4
(Australia) Daniela Di Toro	5	4
(Netherlands) Jiske Griffioen	7	6
(Netherlands) Aniek van Koot	4	2
(South Korea) Hwang Myung-Hee	6	6
(United States) Karin Korb	2	0
(Netherlands) Korie Homan	6	6

Quarterfinals
(Netherlands) Esther Vergeer	6	6
(Japan) Mie Yaosa	1	2
(Netherlands) Sharon Walraven	7^{8}	1	2
(France) Florence Gravellier	6^{6}	6	6
(United Kingdom) Lucy Shuker	2	0
(Netherlands) Jiske Griffioen	6	6
(South Korea) Myung-Hee Hwang	0	1
(Netherlands) Korie Homan	6	6

Semifinals
(Netherlands) Esther Vergeer	6	6
(France) Florence Gravellier	1	1
(Netherlands) Jiske Griffioen	2	3
(Netherlands) Korie Homan	6	6

Finals
(Netherlands) Esther Vergeer	6	6
(Netherlands) Korie Homan	3	3
