= 2008 Australian Open – Girls' doubles =

Girls' doubles
- 2008 Australian Open

Final
- Champion: (Russia) Ksenia Lykina (Russia) Anastasia Pavlyuchenkova
- Runner-up: (Romania) Elena Bogdan (Japan) Misaki Doi
- Score: 6–0, 6–4

Events
Singles	men	women		boys	girls
Doubles	men	women	mixed	boys	girls
WC Singles	men	women	quad
WC Doubles	men	women	quad
Legends	men	women	mixed
- Australian Open

The girls' doubles draw for the 2008 Australian Open.

Ksenia Lykina and Anastasia Pavlyuchenkova won the title, defeating Elena Bogdan and Misaki Doi in the final, 6–0, 6–4.

== Seeds ==
1. (Russia) Ksenia Lykina /
  (Russia) Anastasia Pavlyuchenkova (champions)
2. (Romania) Simona Halep /
  (Poland) Katarzyna Piter (quarterfinals)
3. (Australia) Tyra Calderwood /
  (Austria) Nikola Hofmanova (quarterfinals)
4. (Thailand) Noppawan Lertcheewakarn /
  (Thailand) Sophia Mulsap (quarterfinals)
5. (Serbia) Bojana Jovanovski /
  (France) Kristina Mladenovic (quarterfinals)
6. —
7. (United States) Madison Brengle /
  (United States) Alexa Guarachi (second round)
8. (Russia) Marta Sirotkina /
  (China) Zhou Yi-Miao (semifinals)

== Draw ==
Key

- Q = Qualifier
- WC = Wild card
- LL = Lucky loser
- Alt = Alternate
- ITF = ITF entry
- PR = Protected ranking
- SR = Special ranking
- SE = Special exempt
- JE = Junior exempt
- JR = Junior Accelerator Programme entrant
- CO = College Accelerator Programme entrant
- NG = Next Gen Accelerator Program entrant
- w/o = Walkover
- r = Retired
- d = Defaulted

=== Finals ===
Quarterfinals
1	(Russia) Ksenia Lykina (Russia) Anastasia Pavlyuchenkova	6	6
5	(Serbia) Bojana Jovanovski (France) Kristina Mladenovic	4	4
3	(Australia) Tyra Calderwood (Austria) Nikola Hofmanova	5	1
(United Kingdom) Jade Curtis (Australia) Alenka Hubacek	7	6
(Romania) Elena Bogdan (Japan) Misaki Doi	7	6
4	(Thailand) Noppawan Lertcheewakarn (Thailand) Sophia Mulsap	5	3
8	(Russia) Marta Sirotkina (China) Zhou Yi-Miao	7^{7}	7
2	(Romania) Simona Halep (Poland) Katarzyna Piter	6^{5}	5

Semifinals
1	(Russia) K Lykina (Russia) A Pavlyuchenkova	6	6
(United Kingdom) J Curtis (Australia) A Hubacek	2	4
(Romania) E Bogdan (Japan) M Doi	4	7^{8}	[10]
8	(Russia) M Sirotkina (China) Z Yi-Miao	6	6^{6}	[7]

Final
1	(Russia) K Lykina (Russia) A Pavlyuchenkova	6	6
(Romania) E Bogdan (Japan) M Doi	0	4

=== Section 1 ===
First round
1	(Russia) Ksenia Lykina (Russia) Anastasia Pavlyuchenkova	6	6
(Thailand) Kanyapat Narattana (Hong Kong) Yang Zi-Jun	4	2
(Israel) Chen Astrogo (South Africa) Bianca Swanepoel	6	6
WC	(Australia) Hayley Ericksen (Australia) Harriet Sheehan	1	3
(Australia) Alison Bai (Australia) Marija Mirkovic	6	6
(Italy) Anastassia Grymalska (Italy) Lara Meccico	3	4
(Serbia) Milana Špremo (Slovakia) Romana Tabaková	0	2
5	(Serbia) Bojana Jovanovski (France) Kristina Mladenovic	6	6
3	(Australia) Tyra Calderwood (Austria) Nikola Hofmanova	6	6
(India) Janaki Gunuganti (India) Poojashree Venkatesha	2	2
(Australia) Tammi Patterson (Australia) Olivia Rich	6	6
(Denmark) Karen Barbat (Poland) Sandra Zaniewska	2	3
(United Kingdom) Jade Curtis (Australia) Alenka Hubacek	6	7
WC	(Australia) Kelly Blake (Australia) Brittany Sheed	2	5
(Germany) Linda Berlinecke (Germany) Mara Nowak	1	2
(Serbia) Juljic Lukac (New Zealand) Chelsea Te Tai	6	6

Second round
1	(Russia) K Lykina (Russia) A Pavlyuchenkova	6	4	13
(Israel) C Astrogo (South Africa) B Swanepoel	4	6	11
(Australia) A Bai (Australia) M Mirkovic	3	3
5	(Serbia) B Jovanovski (France) K Mladenovic	6	6
3	(Australia) T Calderwood (Austria) N Hofmanova	6	6
(Australia) T Patterson (Australia) O Rich	1	1
(United Kingdom) J Curtis (Australia) A Hubacek	6	6
(Serbia) J Lukac (New Zealand) C Te Tai	0	2

Quarterfinals
1	(Russia) K Lykina (Russia) A Pavlyuchenkova	6	6
5	(Serbia) B Jovanovski (France) K Mladenovic	4	4
3	(Australia) T Calderwood (Austria) N Hofmanova	5	1
(United Kingdom) J Curtis (Australia) A Hubacek	7	6

Semifinals
1	(Russia) K Lykina (Russia) A Pavlyuchenkova	6	6
(United Kingdom) J Curtis (Australia) A Hubacek	2	4

=== Section 2 ===
First round
7	(United States) Madison Brengle (United States) Alexa Guarachi	6	6
(Japan) Miyabi Inoue (Japan) Aki Yamasoto	4	3
(Romania) Elena Bogdan (Japan) Misaki Doi	6	6
WC	(Australia) Janelle Cuthbertson (Australia) Karis Ryan	3	3
(Chinese Taipei) Kai-Chen Chang (Thailand) Khunpak Isaara	2	3
(Chinese Taipei) Hao-Ching Chan (Japan) Shiho Otake	6	6
WC	(Australia) Benita Milenkiewicz (Australia) Olivia Rogowska	6^{3}	2
4	(Thailand) Noppawan Lertcheewakarn (Thailand) Sophia Mulsap	7^{7}	6
8	(Russia) Marta Sirotkina (China) Zhou Yi-Miao	6	7
(Australia) Jade Hopper (Canada) Rebecca Marino	3	5
(Netherlands) Lesley Kerkhove (Netherlands) Arantxa Rus	6	6
(Indonesia) Beatrice Gumulya (Indonesia) Jessy Rompies	4	0
(Morocco) Nadia Lalami (Italy) Vivienne Vierin	3	6	[2]
(Romania) Alexandra Damaschin (Italy) Claudia Giovine	6	3	[10]
(Australia) Isabella Holland (Australia) Sally Peers	1	6^{6}
2	(Romania) Simona Halep (Poland) Katarzyna Piter	6	7^{8}

Second round
7	(United States) M Brengle (United States) A Guarachi	3	4
(Romania) E Bogdan (Japan) M Doi	6	6
(Chinese Taipei) H-C Chan (Japan) S Otake	4	0
4	(Thailand) N Lertcheewakarn (Thailand) S Mulsap	6	6
8	(Russia) M Sirotkina (China) Y-M Zhou	6	7^{7}
(Netherlands) L Kerkhove (Netherlands) A Rus	2	6^{2}
(Romania) A Damaschin (Italy) C Giovine	4	1
2	(Romania) S Halep (Poland) K Piter	6	6

Quarterfinals
(Romania) E Bogdan (Japan) M Doi	7	6
4	(Thailand) N Lertcheewakarn (Thailand) S Mulsap	5	3
8	(Russia) M Sirotkina (China) Y-M Zhou	7^{7}	7
2	(Romania) S Halep (Poland) K Piter	6^{5}	5

Semifinals
(Romania) E Bogdan (Japan) M Doi	4	7^{8}	[10]
8	(Russia) M Sirotkina (China) Y-M Zhou	6	6^{6}	[7]
