= 2008 Australian Open – Wheelchair women's doubles =

Wheelchair women's doubles
- 2008 Australian Open

Final
- Champion: (Netherlands) Jiske Griffioen (Netherlands) Esther Vergeer
- Runner-up: (Netherlands) Korie Homan (Netherlands) Sharon Walraven
- Score: 6–3, 6–1

Events
Singles	men	women		boys	girls
Doubles	men	women	mixed	boys	girls
WC Singles	men	women	quad
WC Doubles	men	women	quad
Legends	men	women	mixed
← 2007 ·	Australian Open	· 2009 →

Two-time defending champions Jiske Griffioen and Esther Vergeer defeated Korie Homan and Sharon Walraven in the final, 6–3, 6–1 to win the women's doubles wheelchair tennis title at the 2008 Australian Open.

== Seeds ==
1. (Netherlands) Jiske Griffioen / (Netherlands) Esther Vergeer (champions)
2. (Netherlands) Korie Homan / (Netherlands) Sharon Walraven (final)

== Draw ==
=== Key ===
- Q = Qualifier
- WC = Wild card
- LL = Lucky loser
- Alt = Alternate
- ITF = ITF entry
- PR = Protected ranking
- SR = Special ranking
- SE = Special exempt
- JE = Junior exempt
- JR = Junior Accelerator Programme entrant
- CO = College Accelerator Programme entrant
- NG = Next Gen Accelerator Program entrant
- w/o = Walkover
- r = Retired
- d = Defaulted

=== Finals ===
First round
1	(Netherlands) Jiske Griffioen (Netherlands) Esther Vergeer	6	6
(South Korea) Hwang Myung-Hee (South Korea) Park Ju-Yeon	2	0
(Netherlands) Maaike Smit (Netherlands) Aniek van Koot	6	6
(Australia) Nicole Harrison (Japan) Mie Yaosa	0	3
(Israel) Illanit Fridman (United States) Karin Korb	3	4
(Australia) Daniela Di Toro (United Kingdom) Lucy Shuker	6	6
(France) Florence Gravellier (United States) Kaitlyn Verfuerth	5	4
2	(Netherlands) Korie Homan (Netherlands) Sharon Walraven	7	6

Semifinals
1	(Netherlands) Jiske Griffioen (Netherlands) Esther Vergeer	6	6
(Netherlands) Maaike Smit (Netherlands) Aniek van Koot	3	0
(Australia) Daniela Di Toro (United Kingdom) Lucy Shuker	3	5
2	(Netherlands) Korie Homan (Netherlands) Sharon Walraven	6	7

Final
1	(Netherlands) Jiske Griffioen (Netherlands) Esther Vergeer	6	6
2	(Netherlands) Korie Homan (Netherlands) Sharon Walraven	3	1
