= 2010 Australian Open – Wheelchair women's doubles =

Wheelchair women's doubles
- 2010 Australian Open

Final
- Champion: (France) Florence Gravellier (Netherlands) Aniek Van Koot
- Runner-up: (United Kingdom) Lucy Shuker (Australia) Daniela Di Toro
- Score: 6–3, 7–6^{(7–2)}

Events
Singles	men	women		boys	girls
Doubles	men	women	mixed	boys	girls
WC Singles	men	women	quad
WC Doubles	men	women	quad
Legends	men	women	mixed
← 2009 ·	Australian Open	· 2011 →

Florence Gravellier and Aniek Van Koot defeated Lucy Shuker and Daniela Di Toro in the final, 6–3, 7–6^{(7–2)} to win the women's doubles wheelchair tennis title at the 2010 Australian Open.

Korie Homan and Esther Vergeer were the reigning champions, but Vergeer chose not compete. Homan partnered Jiske Griffioen, but withdrew before the semifinals.

== Seeds ==
1. (Netherlands) Jiske Griffioen / (Netherlands) Korie Homan (semifinals, withdrew)
2. (United Kingdom) Lucy Shuker / (Australia) Daniela Di Toro (final)

== Draw ==
=== Key ===
- Q = Qualifier
- WC = Wild card
- LL = Lucky loser
- Alt = Alternate
- ITF = ITF entry
- PR = Protected ranking
- SR = Special ranking
- SE = Special exempt
- JE = Junior exempt
- JR = Junior Accelerator Programme entrant
- CO = College Accelerator Programme entrant
- NG = Next Gen Accelerator Program entrant
- w/o = Walkover
- r = Retired
- d = Defaulted

=== Finals ===
Semifinals
1	(Netherlands) Jiske Griffioen (Netherlands) Korie Homan	w/o
(France) Florence Gravellier (Netherlands) Aniek Van Koot
(Germany) Katharina Krüger (Belgium) Annick Sevenans	1	1
2	(United Kingdom) Lucy Shuker (Australia) Daniela Di Toro	6	6

Final
(France) Florence Gravellier (Netherlands) Aniek Van Koot	6	7
2	(United Kingdom) Lucy Shuker (Australia) Daniela Di Toro	3	6^{2}
