= 2010 Australian Open – Girls' singles =

Girls' singles
- 2010 Australian Open

Final
- Champion: (Czech Republic) Karolína Plíšková
- Runner-up: (United Kingdom) Laura Robson
- Score: 6–1, 7–6^{(7–5)}

Events
Singles	men	women		boys	girls
Doubles	men	women	mixed	boys	girls
WC Singles	men	women	quad
WC Doubles	men	women	quad
Legends	men	women	mixed
- Australian Open

Karolína Plíšková won the title, defeating Laura Robson in the final, 6–1, 7–6^{(7–5)}.

Ksenia Pervak was the defending champion, but was no longer eligible to participate in junior events. She competed in the women's singles qualifying competition as the 17th seed, losing to second seed Regina Kulikova in the final round.

== Seeds ==
1. (Hungary) Tímea Babos (quarterfinals)
2. (United Kingdom) Heather Watson (first round)
3. (Russia) Daria Gavrilova (quarterfinals)
4. (Canada) Gabriela Dabrowski (second round)
5. (Croatia) Silvia Njirić (quarterfinals)
6. (Czech Republic) Karolína Plíšková (champion)
7. (Slovenia) Nastja Kolar (second round)
8. (Chile) Camila Silva (first round)
9. (Japan) Sachie Ishizu (second round)
10. (Ukraine) Maryna Zanevska (third round)
11. (Russia) Yulia Putintseva (second round)
12. (Slovakia) Jana Čepelová (second round)
13. (Serbia) Tamara Čurović (first round)
14. (Norway) Ulrikke Eikeri (first round)
15. (China) Zheng Saisai (first round)
16. (Russia) Yana Buchina (third round, retired)

== Draw ==
Key

- Q = Qualifier
- WC = Wild card
- LL = Lucky loser
- Alt = Alternate
- ITF = ITF entry
- PR = Protected ranking
- SR = Special ranking
- SE = Special exempt
- JE = Junior exempt
- JR = Junior Accelerator Programme entrant
- CO = College Accelerator Programme entrant
- NG = Next Gen Accelerator Program entrant
- w/o = Walkover
- r = Retired
- d = Defaulted

=== Finals ===
Quarterfinals
1	(Hungary) Tímea Babos	4	6	5
Q	(Czech Republic) Kristýna Plíšková	6	4	7
(United States) Ester Goldfeld	1	0
(United Kingdom) Laura Robson	6	6
6	(Czech Republic) Karolína Plíšková	6	7
3	(Russia) Daria Gavrilova	1	5
5	(Croatia) Silvia Njirić	6	4	3
(China) Tang Haochen	3	6	6

Semifinals
Q	(Czech Republic) Kristýna Plíšková	3	1
(United Kingdom) Laura Robson	6	6
6	(Czech Republic) Karolína Plíšková	2	7	6
(China) Tang Haochen	6	6^{6}	2

Final
(United Kingdom) Laura Robson	1	6^{5}
6	(Czech Republic) Karolína Plíšková	6	7

=== Top half ===
==== Section 1 ====
First round
1	(Hungary) T Babos	6	7
WC	(Australia) A Sumner	1	6^{2}
Q	(China) M Liu	4	3
(Poland) S Zaniewska	6	6
(Russia) AA Marenko	7	6
(Tunisia) N Abbès	6^{4}	4
Q	(Australia) S Letcher	6	2	6
14	(Norway) U Eikeri	2	6	2
9	(Japan) S Ishizu	6	6
(Ukraine) E Svitolina	2	0
(Russia) P Leykina	0	6	2
(Thailand) L Kumkhum	6	1	6
WC	(Australia) M Polak	0	0
Q	(Czech Republic) Kr Plíšková	6	6
(Germany) A-L Friedsam	2	0
7	(Slovenia) N Kolar	6	6

Second round
1	(Hungary) T Babos	1	6	6
(Poland) S Zaniewska	6	4	1
(Russia) AA Marenko	0	6	6
Q	(Australia) S Letcher	6	1	2
9	(Japan) S Ishizu	7	6^{3}	0
(Thailand) L Kumkhum	6^{2}	7	6
Q	(Czech Republic) Kr Plíšková	6	6
7	(Slovenia) N Kolar	2	1

Third round
1	(Hungary) T Babos	6	6^{2}	6
(Russia) AA Marenko	4	7	1
(Thailand) L Kumkhum	1	6	2
Q	(Czech Republic) Kr Plíšková	6	0	6

Quarterfinals
1	(Hungary) T Babos	4	6	5
Q	(Czech Republic) Kr Plíšková	6	4	7

==== Section 2 ====
First round
4	(Canada) G Dabrowski	7	6
(Japan) E Mutaguchi	5	4
(Greece) D Papamichail	3	1
(Russia) K Kirillova	6	6
Q	(Australia) A Nancarrow	3	3
(Denmark) M Grage	6	6
(United States) E Goldfeld	7	2	6
15	(China) S Zheng	5	6	3
11	(Russia) Y Putintseva	6	6
(Slovakia) V Juhászová	2	3
(United Kingdom) L Robson	6	6
WC	(Australia) B Woolcock	0	1
(Thailand) K Upapong	2	1
WC	(Australia) A Myers	6	6
(Romania) C Dinu	6	3	6
8	(Chile) C Silva	1	6	4

Second round
4	(Canada) G Dabrowski	3	4
(Russia) K Kirillova	6	6
(Denmark) M Grage	5	5
(United States) E Goldfeld	7	7
11	(Russia) Y Putintseva	2	6	2
(United Kingdom) L Robson	6	3	6
WC	(Australia) A Myers	7	6^{4}	1
(Romania) C Dinu	5	7	6

Third round
(Russia) K Kirillova	3	6	4
(United States) E Goldfeld	6	1	6
(United Kingdom) L Robson	6	6
(Romania) C Dinu	3	3

Quarterfinals
(United States) E Goldfeld	1	0
(United Kingdom) L Robson	6	6

=== Bottom half ===
==== Section 3 ====
First round
6	(Czech Republic) Ka Plíšková	6	6
(Thailand) K Narattana	1	2
(Tunisia) O Jabeur	3	6	4
WC	(Australia) M Wejnert	6	2	6
(New Zealand) B Preston	2	4
(Japan) R Ozaki	6	6
(Turkey) M Sezer	6^{2}	2
12	(Slovakia) J Čepelová	7	6
13	(Serbia) T Čurović	5	6^{6}
(Indonesia) GS Ysidora	7	7
WC	(Australia) N Hoynaski	3	5
Q	(Canada) M Jodoin	6	7
Q	(India) R Sunkara	6	6
Q	(Japan) M Kato	4	2
WC	(Australia) S Sanders	0	6	3
3	(Russia) D Gavrilova	6	3	6

Second round
6	(Czech Republic) Ka Plíšková	6	7
WC	(Australia) M Wejnert	3	5
(Japan) R Ozaki	6	4	6
12	(Slovakia) J Čepelová	4	6	2
(Indonesia) GS Ysidora	6	6
Q	(Canada) M Jodoin	3	0
Q	(India) R Sunkara	0	2
3	(Russia) D Gavrilova	6	6

Third round
6	(Czech Republic) Ka Plíšková	6	6
(Japan) R Ozaki	4	2
(Indonesia) GS Ysidora	6	2	3
3	(Russia) D Gavrilova	2	6	6

Quarterfinals
6	(Czech Republic) Ka Plíšková	6	7
3	(Russia) D Gavrilova	1	5

==== Section 4 ====
First round
5	(Croatia) S Njirić	6^{4}	6	6
WC	(Australia) T Casey	7	0	3
(Slovakia) C Škamlová	4	7	5
(Chinese Taipei) T-f Juan	6	6^{3}	7
(Poland) P Kania	6	4	6
(Belarus) P Pekhova	2	6	3
Q	(Japan) E Hozumi	1	3
10	(Ukraine) M Zanevska	6	6
16	(Russia) Y Buchina	2	7	6
(South Korea) S-y Hong	6	5	2
(Australia) V Rajicic	3	4
(United States) M Keys	6	6
(Canada) E Bouchard	6^{4}	6	3
(Japan) A Omae	7	4	6
(China) H Tang	6	4	6
2	(United Kingdom) H Watson	1	6	1

Second round
5	(Croatia) S Njirić	6	6
(Chinese Taipei) T-f Juan	4	2
(Poland) P Kania	2	4
10	(Ukraine) M Zanevska	6	6
16	(Russia) Y Buchina	3	7	6
(United States) M Keys	6	5	2
(Japan) A Omae	3	2
(China) H Tang	6	6

Third round
5	(Croatia) S Njirić	6	6
10	(Ukraine) M Zanevska	3	2
16	(Russia) Y Buchina	3	1	r
(China) H Tang	6	4

Quarterfinals
5	(Croatia) S Njirić	6	4	3
(China) H Tang	3	6	6
