= 2008 Australian Open – Girls' singles =

Girls' singles
- 2008 Australian Open

Final
- Champion: (Netherlands) Arantxa Rus
- Runner-up: (Australia) Jessica Moore
- Score: 6–3, 6–4

Events
Singles	men	women		boys	girls
Doubles	men	women	mixed	boys	girls
WC Singles	men	women	quad
WC Doubles	men	women	quad
Legends	men	women	mixed
- Australian Open

Arantxa Rus won the title, defeating Jessica Moore in the final, 6–3, 6–4.

Anastasia Pavlyuchenkova was the two-time defending champion, but lost in the quarterfinals to Simona Halep.

== Seeds ==
1. (Russia) Anastasia Pavlyuchenkova (quarterfinals)
2. (Russia) Ksenia Lykina (third round)
3. (Austria) Nikola Hofmanova (second round)
4. (United States) Madison Brengle (third round)
5. (Serbia) Bojana Jovanovski (quarterfinals)
6. (France) Cindy Chala (first round)
7. (Thailand) Noppawan Lertcheewakarn (third round)
8. (Poland) Katarzyna Piter (third round)
9. (Australia) Sacha Jones (second round)
10. (Romania) Simona Halep (semifinals)
11. (China) Zhou Yimiao (semifinals)
12. (Chinese Taipei) Chang Kai-chen (second round)
13. (United Kingdom) Jade Curtis (second round)
14. (Netherlands) Arantxa Rus (champion)
15. (Australia) Tyra Calderwood (second round)
16. (Canada) Rebecca Marino (second round)

== Draw ==
Key

- Q = Qualifier
- WC = Wild card
- LL = Lucky loser
- Alt = Alternate
- ITF = ITF entry
- PR = Protected ranking
- SR = Special ranking
- SE = Special exempt
- JE = Junior exempt
- JR = Junior Accelerator Programme entrant
- CO = College Accelerator Programme entrant
- NG = Next Gen Accelerator Program entrant
- w/o = Walkover
- r = Retired
- d = Defaulted

=== Finals ===
Quarterfinals
1	(Russia) Anastasia Pavlyuchenkova	2	3
10	(Romania) Simona Halep	6	6
(Croatia) Jasmina Tinjić	4	0
(Australia) Jessica Moore	6	6
5	(Serbia) Bojana Jovanovski	1	3
14	(Netherlands) Arantxa Rus	6	6
11	(China) Zhou Yimiao	6	6
(Denmark) Karen Barbat	0	3

Semifinals
10	(Romania) Simona Halep	2	2
(Australia) Jessica Moore	6	6
14	(Netherlands) Arantxa Rus	6	6
11	(China) Zhou Yimiao	4	0

Final
(Australia) Jessica Moore	3	4
14	(Netherlands) Arantxa Rus	6	6

=== Top half ===
==== Section 1 ====
First round
1	(Russia) A Pavlyuchenkova	6	7
(Slovakia) R Tabaková	1	5
Q	(Indonesia) B Gumulya	3	5
(France) V Larrière	6	7
(Australia) I Holland	4	1
(Netherlands) L Kerkhove	6	6
WC	(Australia) O Rogowska	4	1
13	(United Kingdom) J Curtis	6	6
10	(Romania) S Halep	6	6
(Serbia) M Špremo	0	3
Q	(Italy) L Meccico	6^{3}	4
Q	(Thailand) K Isaara	7^{7}	6
(Japan) A Yamasoto	6	2	1
WC	(Australia) B Milenkiewicz	4	6	6
WC	(Australia) A Hubacek	4	0
8	(Poland) K Piter	6	6

Second round
1	(Russia) A Pavlyuchenkova	6	6
(France) V Larrière	0	4
(Netherlands) L Kerkhove	6	6
13	(United Kingdom) J Curtis	3	1
10	(Romania) S Halep	6	6
Q	(Thailand) K Isaara	0	0
WC	(Australia) B Milenkiewicz	2	4
8	(Poland) K Piter	6	6

Third round
1	(Russia) A Pavlyuchenkova	7^{7}	6
(Netherlands) L Kerkhove	6^{5}	3
10	(Romania) S Halep	7^{7}	6
8	(Poland) K Piter	6^{0}	0

Quarterfinals
1	(Russia) A Pavlyuchenkova	2	3
10	(Romania) S Halep	6	6

==== Section 2 ====
First round
3	(Austria) N Hofmanova	6	7
(India) P Venkatesha	1	5
Q	(Australia) T Patterson	4	3
(Japan) M Doi	6	6
(Croatia) J Tinjić	6	6
(Australia) J Hopper	1	1
(Germany) L Berlinecke	6	3	3
16	(Canada) R Marino	4	6	6
12	(Chinese Taipei) K-c Chang	6	6
(Russia) M Sirotkina	1	2
(Italy) C Giovine	1	2
(Australia) J Moore	6	6
WC	(Australia) B Sheed	6	6
(United States) A Guarachi	2	1
(South Africa) B Swanepoel	3	1
7	(Thailand) N Lertcheewakarn	6	6

Second round
3	(Austria) N Hofmanova	4	6	7
(Japan) M Doi	6	1	9
(Croatia) J Tinjić	6	6
16	(Canada) R Marino	1	3
12	(Chinese Taipei) K-c Chang	3	2
(Australia) J Moore	6	6
WC	(Australia) B Sheed	6	6^{1}	5
7	(Thailand) N Lertcheewakarn	1	7^{7}	7

Third round
(Japan) M Doi	2	2
(Croatia) J Tinjić	6	6
(Australia) J Moore	6	6
7	(Thailand) N Lertcheewakarn	1	2

Quarterfinals
(Croatia) J Tinjić	4	0
(Australia) J Moore	6	6

=== Bottom half ===
==== Section 3 ====
First round
5	(Serbia) B Jovanovski	6	6
Q	(India) J Gunuganti	1	3
Q	(Japan) S Otake	3	3
Q	(Germany) M Nowak	6	6
(Australia) A Bai	6	3	9
(Thailand) K Narattana	3	6	7
WC	(Australia) O Rich	2	1
9	(New Zealand) S Jones	6	6
14	(Netherlands) A Rus	6	6
(Poland) S Zaniewska	4	3
WC	(Australia) M Wejnert	4	2
(France) K Mladenovic	6	6
(Australia) S Peers	6	6
(Italy) A Grymalska	3	2
(Romania) A Damaschin	0	4
4	(United States) M Brengle	6	6

Second round
5	(Serbia) B Jovanovski	6	6
Q	(Germany) M Nowak	0	0
(Australia) A Bai	7	7
9	(New Zealand) S Jones	5	5
14	(Netherlands) A Rus	6	7
(France) K Mladenovic	0	5
(Australia) S Peers	1	0
4	(United States) M Brengle	6	6

Third round
5	(Serbia) B Jovanovski	6	6
(Australia) A Bai	1	1
14	(Netherlands) A Rus	4	6	9
4	(United States) M Brengle	6	2	7

Quarterfinals
5	(Serbia) B Jovanovski	1	3
14	(Netherlands) A Rus	6	6

==== Section 4 ====
First round
6	(France) C Chala	1	6	2
WC	(Australia) M Mirkovic	6	1	6
(Romania) E Bogdan	6	3	6
(Hong Kong) Z-j Yang	1	6	1
(Japan) M Inoue	5	7^{9}	0
(Italy) V Vierin	7	6^{7}	6
WC	(Australia) S Wiltshire	3	2
11	(China) Y Zhou	6	6
15	(Australia) T Calderwood	1	7	6
(Indonesia) J Romples	6	5	3
(Morocco) N Lalami	4	1
(Denmark) K Barbat	6	6
(Thailand) S Mulsap	4	5
(Israel) C Astrogo	6	7
Q	(Australia) K Ryan	2	3
2	(Russia) K Lykina	6	6

Second round
WC	(Australia) M Mirkovic	6	1	3
(Romania) E Bogdan	3	6	6
(Italy) V Vierin	0	1
11	(China) Y Zhou	6	6
15	(Australia) T Calderwood	5	2
(Denmark) K Barbat	7	6
(Israel) C Astrogo	5	1
2	(Russia) K Lykina	7	6

Third round
(Romania) E Bogdan	1	0
11	(China) Y Zhou	6	6
(Denmark) K Barbat	6	7^{7}
2	(Russia) K Lykina	1	6^{3}

Quarterfinals
11	(China) Y Zhou	6	6
(Denmark) K Barbat	0	3
