= 2010 Australian Open – Wheelchair women's singles =

Wheelchair women's singles
- 2010 Australian Open

Final
- Champion: (Netherlands) Korie Homan
- Runner-up: (France) Florence Gravellier
- Score: 6–2, 6–2

Events
Singles	men	women		boys	girls
Doubles	men	women	mixed	boys	girls
WC Singles	men	women	quad
WC Doubles	men	women	quad
Legends	men	women	mixed
← 2009 ·	Australian Open	· 2011 →

Korie Homan defeated Florence Gravellier in the final, 6–2, 6–2 to win the women's singles wheelchair tennis title at the 2010 Australian Open.

Esther Vergeer was the four-time reigning champion, but did not participate this year.

== Seeds ==
1. (Netherlands) Korie Homan (champion)
2. (France) Florence Gravellier (final)

== Draw ==
=== Key ===
- Q = Qualifier
- WC = Wild card
- LL = Lucky loser
- Alt = Alternate
- ITF = ITF entry
- PR = Protected ranking
- SR = Special ranking
- SE = Special exempt
- JE = Junior exempt
- JR = Junior Accelerator Programme entrant
- CO = College Accelerator Programme entrant
- NG = Next Gen Accelerator Program entrant
- w/o = Walkover
- r = Retired
- d = Defaulted

=== Finals ===
First round
1	(Netherlands) Korie Homan	6^{5}	7	6
(Australia) Daniela Di Toro	7	5	2
(Germany) Katharina Krüger	0	1
(Netherlands) Aniek Van Koot	6	6
(Belgium) Annick Sevenans	3	6^{5}
(Netherlands) Jiske Griffioen	6	7
(United Kingdom) Lucy Shuker	3	6	4
2	(France) Florence Gravellier	6	2	6

Semifinals
1	(Netherlands) Korie Homan	6	6^{4}	6
(Netherlands) Aniek Van Koot	1	7	2
(Netherlands) Jiske Griffioen	2	4
2	(France) Florence Gravellier	6	6

Final
1	(Netherlands) Korie Homan	6	6
2	(France) Florence Gravellier	2	2
