= 2010 Australian Open – Girls' doubles =

Girls' doubles
- 2010 Australian Open

Final
- Champions: (Slovakia) Jana Čepelová (Slovakia) Chantal Škamlová
- Runners-up: (Hungary) Tímea Babos (Canada) Gabriela Dabrowski
- Score: 7–6^{(7–1)}, 6–2

Events
Singles	men	women		boys	girls
Doubles	men	women	mixed	boys	girls
WC Singles	men	women	quad
WC Doubles	men	women	quad
Legends	men	women	mixed
- Australian Open

Christina McHale and Ajla Tomljanović were the defending champions, but they did not compete in the juniors this year.

Jana Čepelová and Chantal Škamlová won the tournament, defeating Tímea Babos and Gabriela Dabrowski in the final, 7–6^{(7–1)}, 6–2.

== Seeds ==
1. (Hungary) Tímea Babos / (Canada) Gabriela Dabrowski (final)
2. (Slovenia) Nastja Kolar / (Croatia) Silvia Njirić (first round)
3. (Serbia) Tamara Čurović / (Japan) Sachie Ishizu (quarterfinals)
4. (Norway) Ulrikke Eikeri / (Chile) Camila Silva (semifinals)
5. (Canada) Élisabeth Abanda / (Canada) Elianne Douglas-Miron (first round)
6. (Germany) Anna-Lena Friedsam / (Denmark) Mai Grage (second round)
7. (Ukraine) Maryna Zanevska / (Poland) Sandra Zaniewska (first round)
8. (Russia) Daria Gavrilova / (Belarus) Polina Pekhova (second round)

== Draw ==
Key

- Q = Qualifier
- WC = Wild card
- LL = Lucky loser
- Alt = Alternate
- ITF = ITF entry
- PR = Protected ranking
- SR = Special ranking
- SE = Special exempt
- JE = Junior exempt
- JR = Junior Accelerator Programme entrant
- CO = College Accelerator Programme entrant
- NG = Next Gen Accelerator Program entrant
- w/o = Walkover
- r = Retired
- d = Defaulted

=== Finals ===
Semifinals
1	(Hungary) Tímea Babos (Canada) Gabriela Dabrowski	7	6
4	(Norway) Ulrikke Eikeri (Chile) Camila Silva	5	2
(Canada) Eugenie Bouchard (Thailand) Luksika Kumkhum	3	6	[7]
(Slovakia) Jana Čepelová (Slovakia) Chantal Škamlová	6	3	[10]

Final
1	(Hungary) Tímea Babos (Canada) Gabriela Dabrowski	6^{1}	2
(Slovakia) Jana Čepelová (Slovakia) Chantal Škamlová	7	6

=== Top half ===
First round
1	(Hungary) T Babos (Canada) G Dabrowski	6	6
(South Korea) S-y Hong (Japan) R Ozaki	3	1
WC	(Australia) A Myers (Australia) S Sanders	6	5	[9]
(Czech Republic) Ka Plíšková (Czech Republic) Kr Plíšková	2	7	[11]
(Ukraine) O Ianchuk (Ukraine) E Svitolina	5	6	[4]
(United States) E Goldfeld (United States) M Keys	7	3	[10]
(Japan) Y Ito (India) R Sunkara	7	2	[6]
6	(Germany) A-L Friedsam (Denmark) M Grage	6^{5}	6	[10]
4	(Norway) U Eikeri (Chile) C Silva	6	6
(Japan) E Hozumi (Japan) M Kato	0	4
(Romania) C Dinu (Turkey) M Sezer	2	7	[10]
(Australia) V Rajicic (Australia) H Sheahan	6	5	[3]
(Poland) P Kania (Russia) AA Marenko	3	6	[10]
(Tunisia) N Abbès (Tunisia) O Jabeur	6	3	[8]
(China) H Tang (Thailand) K Upapong	1	7	[10]
7	(Ukraine) M Zanevska (Poland) S Zaniewska	6	6^{5}	[6]

Second round
1	(Hungary) T Babos (Canada) G Dabrowski	6	7
(Czech Republic) Ka Plíšková (Czech Republic) Kr Plíšková	4	6^{6}
(United States) E Goldfeld (United States) M Keys	1	6	[10]
6	(Germany) A-L Friedsam (Denmark) M Grage	6	3	8
4	(Norway) U Eikeri (Chile) C Silva	6	6
(Romania) C Dinu (Turkey) M Sezer	2	0
(Poland) P Kania (Russia) AA Marenko	5	6	[10]
(China) H Tang (Thailand) K Upapong	7	4	[6]

Quarterfinals
1	(Hungary) T Babos (Canada) G Dabrowski	4	6	[11]
(United States) E Goldfeld (United States) M Keys	6	3	[9]
4	(Norway) U Eikeri (Chile) C Silva	2	6	[10]
(Poland) P Kania (Russia) AA Marenko	6	1	[3]

Semifinals
1	(Hungary) T Babos (Canada) G Dabrowski	7	6
4	(Norway) U Eikeri (Chile) C Silva	5	2

=== Bottom half ===
First round
5/Alt	(Canada) É Abanda (Canada) E Douglas-Miron	3	0
(Canada) E Bouchard (Thailand) L Kumkhum	6	6
(Greece) D Papamichail (Russia) Y Putintseva	4	6	[10]
(Japan) E Mutaguchi (Japan) A Omae	6	4	[7]
WC	(Australia) M Polak (Australia) B Woolcock	6	0	[9]
(Thailand) K Narattana (Indonesia) GS Ysidora	2	6	[11]
(Chinese Taipei) T-f Juan (China) M Liu	0	1
3	(Serbia) T Čurović (Japan) S Ishizu	6	6
8	(Russia) D Gavrilova (Belarus) P Pekhova	6	4	[10]
(Slovakia) V Juhászová (New Zealand) B Preston	2	6	[4]
WC	(Australia) T Casey (Australia) N Hoynaski	3	1
(Slovakia) J Čepelová (Slovakia) C Škamlová	6	6
WC	(Australia) A Hadzic (Australia) A Nancarrow	6^{4}	1
(Russia) Y Buchina (Russia) K Kirillova	7	6
(Canada) M Jodoin (China) S Zheng	2	6	[10]
2	(Slovenia) N Kolar (Croatia) S Njirić	6	4	[8]

Second round
(Canada) E Bouchard (Thailand) L Kumkhum	6	7
(Greece) D Papamichail (Russia) Y Putintseva	4	5
(Thailand) K Narattana (Indonesia) GS Ysidora	3	2
3	(Serbia) T Čurović (Japan) S Ishizu	6	6
8	(Russia) D Gavrilova (Belarus) P Pekhova	3	4
(Slovakia) J Čepelová (Slovakia) C Škamlová	6	6
(Russia) Y Buchina (Russia) K Kirillova	6	6
(Canada) M Jodoin (China) S Zheng	4	3

Quarterfinals
(Canada) E Bouchard (Thailand) L Kumkhum	6	6
3	(Serbia) T Čurović (Japan) S Ishizu	1	3
(Slovakia) J Čepelová (Slovakia) C Škamlová
(Russia) Y Buchina (Russia) K Kirillova	w/o

Semifinals
(Canada) E Bouchard (Thailand) L Kumkhum	3	6	[7]
(Slovakia) J Čepelová (Slovakia) C Škamlová	6	3	[10]
