= 2008 Australian Open – Boys' doubles =

Boys' doubles
- 2008 Australian Open

Final
- Champion: (Chinese Taipei) Hsieh Cheng-peng (Chinese Taipei) Yang Tsung-hua
- Runner-up: (Canada) Vasek Pospisil (Mexico) César Ramírez
- Score: 3–6, 7–5, [10–5]

Events
Singles	men	women		boys	girls
Doubles	men	women	mixed	boys	girls
WC Singles	men	women	quad
WC Doubles	men	women	quad
Legends	men	women	mixed
- Australian Open

Hsieh Cheng-peng and Yang Tsung-hua won the title by defeating Vasek Pospisil and César Ramírez 3–6, 7–5, [10–5] in the final.

== Seeds ==
1. (United States) Ryan Harrison / (Australia) Matt Reid (quarterfinals)
2. (Canada) Vasek Pospisil / (Mexico) César Ramírez (final)
3. (Japan) Hiroki Moriya / (Australia) Bernard Tomic (quarterfinals)
4. (United Kingdom) Daniel Cox / (United Kingdom) Daniel Evans (quarterfinals)
5. (Thailand) Peerakit Siributwongg / (Thailand) Kittipong Wachiramanowong (first round)
6. (South Korea) Cho Soong-jae / (United States) Ty Trombetta (quarterfinals)
7. (Croatia) Silvio Dadić / (Indonesia) Christopher Rungkat (first round)
8. (France) Axel Michon / (France) Guillaume Rufin (first round)

== Draw ==
Key

- Q = Qualifier
- WC = Wild card
- LL = Lucky loser
- Alt = Alternate
- ITF = ITF entry
- PR = Protected ranking
- SR = Special ranking
- SE = Special exempt
- JE = Junior exempt
- JR = Junior Accelerator Programme entrant
- CO = College Accelerator Programme entrant
- NG = Next Gen Accelerator Program entrant
- w/o = Walkover
- r = Retired
- d = Defaulted

=== Finals ===
Quarterfinals
1	(United States) Ryan Harrison (Australia) Matt Reid	6^{4}	6^{3}
(Australia) Brendan McKenzie (Australia) Nat Maraga	7^{7}	7^{7}
4	(United Kingdom) Daniel Cox (United Kingdom) Daniel Evans	4	4
(Chinese Taipei) Hsieh Cheng-peng (Chinese Taipei) Yang Tsung-hua	6	6
(China) Wu Di (China) Ze Zhang	7	7^{7}
3	(Japan) Hiroki Moriya (Australia) Bernard Tomic	5	6^{5}
6	(South Korea) Cho Soong-jae (United States) Ty Trombetta	3	2
2	(Canada) Vasek Pospisil (Mexico) César Ramírez	6	6

Semifinals
(Australia) Brendan McKenzie (Australia) Nat Maraga	0	5
(Chinese Taipei) Hsieh Cheng-peng (Chinese Taipei) Yang Tsung-hua	6	7
(China) Wu Di (China) Ze Zhang	4	4
2	(Canada) Vasek Pospisil (Mexico) César Ramírez	6	6

Final
(Chinese Taipei) Hsieh Cheng-peng (Chinese Taipei) Yang Tsung-hua	3	7	[10]
2	(Canada) Vasek Pospisil (Mexico) César Ramírez	6	5	[5]

=== Top half ===
First round
1	(United States) Ryan Harrison (Australia) Matt Reid	4	6	[10]
WC	(Australia) Marvin Baker (Australia) Stefan Szacinski	6	1	[8]
(New Zealand) Logan Mackenzie (Australia) Dane Propoggia	6	5	[10]
(Slovenia) Blaž Rola (Slovenia) Jan Tavčar	4	7	[7]
(Australia) Brendan McKenzie (Australia) Nat Maraga	6	7
(Italy) Erik Crepaldi (Italy) Giorgio Portaluri	4	5
(Japan) Hiroyasu Ehara (New Zealand) James Meredith	6	6
8	(France) Axel Michon (France) Guillaume Rufin	1	3
4	(United Kingdom) Daniel Cox (United Kingdom) Daniel Evans	4	6	[10]
(Netherlands) Xander Spong (Netherlands) Tim van Terheijden	6	4	[7]
(New Zealand) Finn Tearney (China) Wu Chenyu	6	6
WC	(Australia) Maverick Banes (Australia) Jarryd Chaplin	2	2
WC	(Australia) Dayne Kelly (Australia) Clifford Marsland	4	6	[10]
(Japan) Tadayuki Longhi (Japan) Yuki Matsuo	6	3	[8]
(Chinese Taipei) Hsieh Cheng-peng (Chinese Taipei) Yang Tsung-hua	6	6
7	(Croatia) Silvio Dadić (Indonesia) Christopher Rungkat	4	4

Second round
1	(United States) R Harrison (Australia) M Reid	6	6
(New Zealand) L Mackenzie (Australia) D Propoggia	1	2
(Australia) B McKenzie (Australia) N Maraga	6	6
(Japan) H Ehara (New Zealand) J Meredith	2	3
4	(United Kingdom) D Cox (United Kingdom) D Evans	6	6
(New Zealand) F Tearney (China) C Wu	3	3
WC	(Australia) D Kelly (Australia) C Marsland	2	4
(Chinese Taipei) C-p Hsieh (Chinese Taipei) T-h Yang	6	6

Quarterfinals
1	(United States) R Harrison (Australia) M Reid	6^{4}	6^{3}
(Australia) B McKenzie (Australia) N Maraga	7^{7}	7^{7}
4	(United Kingdom) D Cox (United Kingdom) D Evans	4	4
(Chinese Taipei) C-p Hsieh (Chinese Taipei) T-h Yang	6	6

Semifinals
(Australia) B McKenzie (Australia) N Maraga	0	5
(Chinese Taipei) C-p Hsieh (Chinese Taipei) T-h Yang	6	7

=== Bottom half ===
First round
5	(Thailand) Peerakit Siributwong (Thailand) K Wachiramanowong	2	4
(United Kingdom) Niall Angus (United Kingdom) Neil Pauffley	6	6
(China) Wu Di (China) Zhang Ze	6	7
(Australia) Andrew Gregory (Australia) Alex Sanders	1	5
(India) Yuki Bhambri (India) Karunuday Singh	3	6^{0}
Alt	(Australia) Jarryd Chaplin (Australia) James Eames	6	7^{6}
(Canada) Sam Garforth-Bles (Egypt) Mohamed Safwat	6^{5}	0
3	(Japan) Hiroki Moriya (Australia) Bernard Tomic	7^{7}	6
6	(South Korea) Cho Soong-jae (United States) Ty Trombetta	7^{7}	6
(Austria) Nikolaus Moser (Serbia) Ilija Vučić	6^{1}	2
WC	(Australia) Krishnanath Balakrishnan (Australia) Stephen Hoh	6	6
(Slovakia) Zalan Klempa (Poland) Szymon Tatarczyk	4	2
(United States) Bradley Klahn (Canada) M Raonic	7^{7}	2	[10]
(Italy) Lorenzo Papasidero (Italy) Daniele Piludu	6^{4}	6	[7]
(Germany) Jaan-Frederik Brunken (Germany) Ralph Regus	2	2
2	(Canada) Vasek Pospisil (Mexico) César Ramírez	6	6

Second round
(United Kingdom) N Angus (United Kingdom) N Pauffley	5	6^{5}
(China) D Wu (China) Z Zhang	7	7^{7}
Alt	(Australia) J Chaplin (Australia) J Eames	2	4
3	(Japan) H Moriya (Australia) B Tomic	6	6
6	(South Korea) S-j Cho (United States) T Trombetta	6	6
WC	(Australia) K Balakrishnan (Australia) S Hoh	4	2
(United States) B Klahn (Canada) M Raonic	6	6^{8}	8
2	(Canada) V Pospisil (Mexico) C Ramírez	2	7^{10}	10

Quarterfinals
(China) D Wu (China) Z Zhang	7	7^{7}
3	(Japan) H Moriya (Australia) B Tomic	5	6^{5}
6	(South Korea) S-j Cho (United States) T Trombetta	3	2
2	(Canada) V Pospisil (Mexico) C Ramírez	6	6

Semifinals
(China) D Wu (China) Z Zhang	4	4
2	(Canada) V Pospisil (Mexico) C Ramírez	6	6
