= 2008 Australian Open – Boys' singles =

Boys' singles
- 2008 Australian Open

Final
- Champion: (Australia) Bernard Tomic
- Runner-up: (Chinese Taipei) Yang Tsung-hua
- Score: 4–6, 7–6^{(7–5)}, 6–0

Events
Singles	men	women		boys	girls
Doubles	men	women	mixed	boys	girls
WC Singles	men	women	quad
WC Doubles	men	women	quad
Legends	men	women	mixed
- Australian Open

Bernard Tomic won in the final 4–6, 7–6^{(7–5)}, 6–0, against Yang Tsung-hua and claimed the title, becoming the youngest male player to win a grand slam title.

Brydan Klein was the defending champion, but did not compete in the juniors event that year.

== Seeds ==
1. (Mexico) César Ramírez (quarterfinals)
2. (Poland) Jerzy Janowicz (quarterfinals)
3. (United Kingdom) Daniel Evans (quarterfinals)
4. (United States) Ryan Harrison (semifinals)
5. (Australia) Bernard Tomic (champion)
6. (Australia) Andrew Thomas (third round)
7. (Australia) Jared Easton (third round)
8. (India) Yuki Bhambri (semifinals)
9. (Australia) Matt Reid (first round)
10. (Chinese Taipei) Yang Tsung-hua (final)
11. (Germany) Jaan-Frederik Brunken (third round)
12. (Australia) Mark Verryth (second round)
13. (Thailand) Kittipong Wachiramanowong (third round)
14. (Canada) Vasek Pospisil (first round)
15. (United States) Ty Trombetta (third round)
16. (United Kingdom) ~~Marcus Willis~~ (withdrew)

== Draw ==
Key

- Q = Qualifier
- WC = Wild card
- LL = Lucky loser
- Alt = Alternate
- ITF = ITF entry
- PR = Protected ranking
- SR = Special ranking
- SE = Special exempt
- JE = Junior exempt
- JR = Junior Accelerator Programme entrant
- CO = College Accelerator Programme entrant
- NG = Next Gen Accelerator Program entrant
- w/o = Walkover
- r = Retired
- d = Defaulted

=== Finals ===
Quarterfinals
1	(Mexico) César Ramírez	4	3
5	(Australia) Bernard Tomic	6	6
3	(United Kingdom) Daniel Evans	6^{5}	6	3
8	(India) Yuki Bhambri	7	4	6
(China) Wu Di	6	3	0
4	(United States) Ryan Harrison	3	6	6
10	(Chinese Taipei) Yang Tsung-hua	7	6
2	(Poland) Jerzy Janowicz	5	1

Semifinals
5	(Australia) Bernard Tomic	6	5	6
8	(India) Yuki Bhambri	0	7	1
4	(United States) Ryan Harrison	4	6^{7}
10	(Chinese Taipei) Yang Tsung-hua	6	7

Final
5	(Australia) Bernard Tomic	4	7	6
10	(Chinese Taipei) Yang Tsung-hua	6	6^{5}	0

=== Top half ===
==== Section 1 ====
First round
1	(Mexico) César Ramírez	6	6
(United Kingdom) Niall Angus	3	1
WC	(Serbia) Marko Djokovic	6	0	2
WC	(Australia) Clifford Marsland	3	6	6
(Italy) Lorenzo Papasidero	5	6^{4}
(Australia) Brendan McKenzie	7	7
(United States) Bradley Klahn	7	6
14	(Canada) Vasek Pospisil	5	4
11	(Germany) Jaan-Frederik Brunken	6	6
WC	(Australia) Marvin Barker	2	2
(France) Axel Michon	6	7
(New Zealand) Finn Tearney	2	6^{3}
Q	(Japan) Hiroyasu Ehara	7	5	4
Q	(Slovenia) Blaž Rola	6^{4}	7	6
(China) Wu Chenyu	6^{3}	2
5	(Australia) Bernard Tomic	7	6

Second round
1	(Mexico) C Ramírez	6	6
WC	(Australia) C Marsland	4	2
(Australia) B McKenzie	2	6	2
(United States) B Klahn	6	3	6
11	(Germany) J-F Brunken	6	6
(France) A Michon	3	4
Q	(Slovenia) B Rola	2	4
5	(Australia) B Tomic	6	6

Third round
1	(Mexico) C Ramírez	6	6
(United States) B Klahn	3	4
11	(Germany) J-F Brunken	7	3	6
5	(Australia) B Tomic	5	6	8

Quarterfinals
1	(Mexico) C Ramírez	4	3
5	(Australia) B Tomic	6	6

==== Section 2 ====
First round
3	(United Kingdom) Daniel Evans	6	6
(Chinese Taipei) Hsieh Cheng-peng	2	2
WC	(Australia) Dayne Kelly	6	0	2
(Netherlands) Xander Spong	3	6	6
Q	(Austria) Nikolaus Moser	6	6^{4}	5
(Poland) Szymon Tatarczyk	3	7	7
WC	(Australia) Krishnanath Balakrishnan	3	6^{3}
15	(United States) Ty Trombetta	6	7
9	(Australia) Matt Reid	6	5	4
(Japan) Tadayuki Longhi	2	7	6
(Thailand) Peerakit Siributwong	6	6
WC	(Australia) Stefan Szacinki	4	2
(United Kingdom) Neil Pauffley	3	6^{10}
(Slovakia) Zalán Klempa	6	7
(Italy) Giorgio Portaluri	3	6	1
8	(India) Yuki Bhambri	6	2	6

Second round
3	(United Kingdom) D Evans	6	0	6
(Netherlands) X Spong	4	6	2
(Poland) S Tatarczyk	4	6	6
15	(United States) T Trombetta	6	1	8
(Japan) T Longhi	6	6
(Thailand) P Siributwong	4	4
(Slovakia) Z Klempa	6	4	2
8	(India) Y Bhambri	3	6	6

Third round
3	(United Kingdom) D Evans	6	6
15	(United States) T Trombetta	3	2
(Japan) T Longhi	1	3
8	(India) Y Bhambri	6	6

Quarterfinals
3	(United Kingdom) D Evans	6^{5}	6	3
8	(India) Y Bhambri	7	4	6

=== Bottom half ===
==== Section 3 ====
First round
6	(Australia) Andrew Thomas	5
(Israel) Gilad Ben Zvi	3	r
(Italy) Erik Crepaldi	7	2	8
(Indonesia) Christopher Rungkat	6^{1}	6	6
(China) Wu Di	6	6
(South Korea) Cho Soong-Jae	3	2
(New Zealand) Logan Mackenzie	1	3
12	(Australia) Mark Verryth	6	6
LL	(Australia) James Eames	3	3
WC	(Australia) Andrew Gregory	6	6
(Japan) Hiroki Moriya	6	7
(Egypt) Mohamed Safwat	4	5
Q	(Canada) Sam Garforth-Bles	6	6
(Croatia) Silvio Dadić	4	4
(Romania) Robert Coman	2	4
4	(United States) Ryan Harrison	6	6

Second round
6	(Australia) A Thomas	6^{4}	6	6
(Italy) E Crepaldi	7	4	4
(China) D Wu	7	6
12	(Australia) M Verryth	6^{5}	3
WC	(Australia) A Gregory	6	4	4
(Japan) H Moriya	4	6	6
Q	(Canada) S Garforth-Bles	3	4
4	(United States) R Harrison	6	6

Third round
6	(Australia) A Thomas	7	3	6
(China) D Wu	5	6	8
(Japan) H Moriya	6	3	2
4	(United States) R Harrison	4	6	6

Quarterfinals
(China) D Wu	6	3	0
4	(United States) R Harrison	3	6	6

==== Section 4 ====
First round
7	(Australia) Jared Easton	6	6
(United Kingdom) Daniel Cox	3	4
(Serbia) Ilija Vučić	1	3
(France) Guillaume Rufin	6	6
Q	(Italy) Daniele Piludu	6	0	3
Q	(India) Karunuday Singh	4	6	6
WC	(Australia) Maverick Banes	3	2
10	(Chinese Taipei) Yang Tsung-hua	6	6
13	(Thailand) Kittipong Wachiramanowong	6	7
(Canada) Milos Raonic	3	6^{6}
(Slovenia) Jan Tavčar	6^{9}	4
(Australia) Alex Sanders	7	6
Q	(Australia) Dane Propoggia	7	6
(Netherlands) Timothy van Terheijden	6^{4}	4
Q	(New Zealand) James Meredith	2	4
2	(Poland) Jerzy Janowicz	6	6

Second round
7	(Australia) J Easton	6	3	8
(France) G Rufin	3	6	6
Q	(India) K Singh	6^{4}	4
10	(Chinese Taipei) T-h Yang	7	6
13	(Thailand) K Wachiramanowong	6	6
(Australia) A Sanders	2	2
Q	(Australia) D Propoggia	7	1	3
2	(Poland) J Janowicz	6^{4}	6	6

Third round
7	(Australia) J Easton	2	4
10	(Chinese Taipei) T-h Yang	6	6
13	(Thailand) K Wachiramanowong	3	3
2	(Poland) J Janowicz	6	6

Quarterfinals
10	(Chinese Taipei) T-h Yang	7	6
2	(Poland) J Janowicz	5	1
