= 2008 Australian Open – Wheelchair quad singles =

Wheelchair quad singles
- 2008 Australian Open

Final
- Champion: (United Kingdom) Peter Norfolk
- Runner-up: (United States) David Wagner
- Score: 6–2, 6–3

Events
Singles	men	women		boys	girls
Doubles	men	women	mixed	boys	girls
WC Singles	men	women	quad
WC Doubles	men	women	quad
Legends	men	women	mixed
- Australian Open

Peter Norfolk defeated David Wagner in the final, 6–2, 6–3 to win the inaugural quad singles wheelchair tennis title at the 2008 Australian Open.

== Seeds ==
1. (United States) David Wagner (final)
2. (United Kingdom) Peter Norfolk (champion)

== Draw ==
Key

- Q = Qualifier
- WC = Wild card
- LL = Lucky loser
- Alt = Alternate
- ITF = ITF entry
- PR = Protected ranking
- SR = Special ranking
- SE = Special exempt
- JE = Junior exempt
- JR = Junior Accelerator Programme entrant
- CO = College Accelerator Programme entrant
- NG = Next Gen Accelerator Program entrant
- w/o = Walkover
- r = Retired
- d = Defaulted

=== Finals ===
First round
1	(United States) David Wagner	6	0	7
(Canada) Sarah Hunter	2	6	5
(Australia) Mathew Ingram	0	2
(United States) Brent Poppen	6	6
(Sweden) Johan Andersson	1	2
(United States) Nicholas Taylor	6	6
(Netherlands) Dorrie Timmermans-van Hall	1	5
2	(United Kingdom) Peter Norfolk	6	7

Semifinals
1	(United States) David Wagner	6	6
(United States) Brent Poppen	2	3
(United States) Nicholas Taylor	2	2
2	(United Kingdom) Peter Norfolk	6	6

Final
1	(United States) David Wagner	2	3
2	(United Kingdom) Peter Norfolk	6	6
