= Dominik Schulz =

German tennis player (born 1992)

- Country (sports): Germany
- Residence: Munich, Germany
- Born: 16 March 1992 (age 34) Munich, Germany
- Plays: Left-handed (two-handed backhand)
- Prize money: $17,736

Singles
- Career record: 0–0
- Career titles: 0; 0 Challenger, 0 Futures
- Highest ranking: No. 747 (15 April 2013)

Doubles
- Career record: 0–1
- Career titles: 0; 0 Challenger, 5 Futures
- Highest ranking: No. 445 (10 February 2014)
- Last updated on: 24 August 2021.

Dominik Schulz (born 16 March 1992) is a retired German tennis player.

Schulz has a career high ATP singles ranking of 747 achieved on 15 April 2013. He also has a career high ATP doubles ranking of 445 achieved on 10 February 2014.

Schulz made his ATP main draw debut at the 2013 Power Horse Cup in the doubles draw partnering Richard Becker.

== Junior Grand Slam finals ==
=== Boys' Doubles 1 (1 runner-up) ===
Result	Year	To	Surface	Partner	Opponent	Score
Loss	2010	Australian Open	Hard	(Germany) Kevin Krawietz	(Netherlands) Justin Eleveld (Netherlands) Jannick Lupescu	4–6, 4–6

== ATP Challenger and ITF Futures finals ==
=== Doubles: 10 (5–5) ===
Legend ATP Challenger (0–0) ITF Futures (5–5)	Finals by surface Hard (1–1) Clay (4–3) Grass (0–0) Carpet (0–1)

Result	W–L	Date	Tournament	Tier	Surface	Partner	Opponents	Score
Loss	0–1	May 2011	Bulgaria F3, Sofia	Futures	Clay	(Austria) Maximilian Neuchrist	(Germany) Matthias Kolbe (Germany) Steven Moneke	1–6, 2–6
Loss	0–2	Apr 2012	Vietnam F3, Ho Chi Minh City	Futures	Hard	(Germany) Maximilian Wilde	(Thailand) Weerapat Doakmaiklee (Thailand) Kittiphong Wachiramanowong	4–6, 2–6
Win	1–2	Jul 2012	Turkey F26, İzmir	Futures	Clay	(Serbia) Miljan Zekić	(Russia) Sergei Krotiouk (Russia) Mikhail Vasiliev	6–1, 6–2
Win	2–2	Jul 2012	Turkey F27, İzmir	Futures	Clay	(Serbia) Miljan Zekić	(Italy) Giovanni Zennaro (Italy) Nicola Ghedin	7–6^{(7–4)}, 6–4
Win	3–2	May 2013	Egypt F5, Sharm El Sheikh	Futures	Clay	(Austria) Nicolas Reissig	(Egypt) Karim-Mohamed Maamoun (Egypt) Sherif Sabry	6–4, 6–4
Win	4–2	May 2013	Egypt F6, Sharm El Sheikh	Futures	Clay	(Germany) Kevin Krawietz	(Morocco) Younès Rachidi (Morocco) Mehdi Ziadi	6–2, 6–1
Loss	4–3	Jun 2013	Greece F9, Thessaloniki	Futures	Clay	(Barbados) Darian King	(Greece) Konstantinos Economidis (Greece) Alexandros Jakupovic	1–6, 2–6
Loss	4–4	Oct 2013	Germany F20, Bad Salzdetfurth	Futures	Carpet	(Germany) Daniel Masur	(Germany) Andreas Mies (Germany) Oscar Otte	7–5, 3–6, [8–10]
Win	5–4	Dec 2013	Qatar F3, Doha	Futures	Hard	(Poland) Adam Chadaj	(United Kingdom) Luke Bambridge (United Kingdom) Evan Hoyt	1–6, 7–6^{(7–4)}, [10–4]
Loss	5–5	Jul 2014	Austria F2, Seefeld	Futures	Clay	(Germany) Kevin Krawietz	(United States) Erik Elliott (Australia) Gavin Van Peperzeel	6–3, 2–6, [8–10]
