= 2008 Australian Open – Wheelchair quad doubles =

Wheelchair quad doubles
- 2008 Australian Open

Final
- Champion: (United States) Nicholas Taylor (United States) David Wagner
- Runner-up: (Canada) Sarah Hunter (United Kingdom) Peter Norfolk
- Score: 5–7, 6–0, [10–3]

Events
Singles	men	women		boys	girls
Doubles	men	women	mixed	boys	girls
WC Singles	men	women	quad
WC Doubles	men	women	quad
Legends	men	women	mixed
- Australian Open

Nicholas Taylor and David Wagner defeated Sarah Hunter and Peter Norfolk in the final, 5–7, 6–0, [10–3] to win the inaugural quad doubles wheelchair tennis title at the 2008 Australian Open.

== Seeds ==
1. (United States) Nicholas Taylor / (United States) David Wagner (champions)
2. (Canada) Sarah Hunter / (United Kingdom) Peter Norfolk (finals)

== Draw ==
Key

- Q = Qualifier
- WC = Wild card
- LL = Lucky loser
- Alt = Alternate
- ITF = ITF entry
- PR = Protected ranking
- SR = Special ranking
- SE = Special exempt
- JE = Junior exempt
- JR = Junior Accelerator Programme entrant
- CO = College Accelerator Programme entrant
- NG = Next Gen Accelerator Program entrant
- w/o = Walkover
- r = Retired
- d = Defaulted

=== Finals ===
Semifinals
1	(United States) Nicholas Taylor (United States) David Wagner	6	6
(Australia) Mathew Ingram (United States) Brent Poppen	1	0
(Sweden) Johan Andersson (Netherlands) Dorrie Timmermans-van Hall	4	3
2	(Canada) Sarah Hunter (United Kingdom) Peter Norfolk	6	6

Finals
1	(United States) Nicholas Taylor (United States) David Wagner	5	6	[10]
2	(Canada) Sarah Hunter (United Kingdom) Peter Norfolk	7	0	[3]
