= Jannick Lupescu =

Dutch tennis player (born 1993)

- Country (sports): Netherlands
- Born: 16 July 1993 (age 32) Dordrecht, Netherlands
- Plays: Right-handed (two-handed backhand)
- Prize money: $8,303

Singles
- Career record: 0–0
- Career titles: 0
- Highest ranking: No. 841 (1 November 2010)

Doubles
- Career record: 0–0
- Career titles: 1 ITF
- Highest ranking: No. 792 (14 November 2011)
- Last updated on: 26 January 2020.

Jannick Lupescu (born 16 July 1993) is a Dutch tennis player.

Lupescu has a career high ATP singles ranking of 841 achieved on 1 November 2010. He also has a career high ATP doubles ranking of 792 achieved on 14 November 2011. Lupescu has won one ITF doubles title.

Lupescu won the 2010 Australian Open boys' doubles title, partnering Justin Eleveld. They defeated Kevin Krawietz and Dominik Schulz in the final. Lupescu had a career high junior ranking of 9, achieved in 2011.

== Junior Grand Slam finals ==
=== Doubles ===
Result	Year	Championship	Surface	Partner	Opponents	Score
Win	2010	Australian Open	Hard	(Netherlands) Justin Eleveld	(Germany) Kevin Krawietz (Germany) Dominik Schulz	6–4, 6–4
