= 2008 Australian Open – Wheelchair men's doubles =

Wheelchair men's doubles
- 2008 Australian Open

Final
- Champion: (Japan) Shingo Kunieda (Japan) Satoshi Saida
- Runner-up: (Netherlands) Robin Ammerlaan (Netherlands) Ronald Vink
- Score: 6–4, 6–3

Events
Singles	men	women		boys	girls
Doubles	men	women	mixed	boys	girls
WC Singles	men	women	quad
WC Doubles	men	women	quad
Legends	men	women	mixed
- Australian Open

Defending champion Shingo Kunieda and his partner Satoshi Saida defeated the other four-time defending champion Robin Ammerlaan and his partner Ronald Vink in the final, 6–4, 6–3 to win the men's doubles wheelchair tennis title at the 2008 Australian Open.

== Seeds ==
1. (Japan) Shingo Kunieda / (Japan) Satoshi Saida (champions)
2. (Netherlands) Robin Ammerlaan / (Netherlands) Ronald Vink (final)

== Draw ==
Key

- Q = Qualifier
- WC = Wild card
- LL = Lucky loser
- Alt = Alternate
- ITF = ITF entry
- PR = Protected ranking
- SR = Special ranking
- SE = Special exempt
- JE = Junior exempt
- JR = Junior Accelerator Programme entrant
- CO = College Accelerator Programme entrant
- NG = Next Gen Accelerator Program entrant
- w/o = Walkover
- r = Retired
- d = Defaulted

=== Finals ===
First round
1	(Japan) Shingo Kunieda (Japan) Satoshi Saida
BYE; BYE
(Japan) Yoshinobu Fujimoto (United States) Tony Lara	4	1
(Chile) Robinson Mendez (France) Nicolas Peifer	6	6
(France) Frédéric Cattanéo (Austria) Martin Legner
BYE; BYE
(Japan) Takahiro Hirate (Australia) David Latham	2	6	[10]
(Australia) Michael Dobbie (Germany) Steffen Sommerfield	6	1	7
(Poland) Tadeusz Kruszelnicki (United States) Jon Rydberg	5	6	9
(Australia) Anthony Bonaccurso (Australia) Ben Weeks	7	1	11
BYE; BYE
(France) Stéphane Houdet (France) Michaël Jérémiasz
(Netherlands) Maikel Scheffers (Netherlands) Eric Stuurman	3	6	4
(Sweden) Niclas Rodhborn (United Kingdom) David Phillipson	6	1	[10]
BYE; BYE
2	(Netherlands) Robin Ammerlaan (Netherlands) Ronald Vink

Quarterfinals
1	(Japan) Shingo Kunieda (Japan) Satoshi Saida	6	6
(Chile) Robinson Mendez (France) Nicolas Peifer	1	2
(France) Frédéric Cattanéo (Austria) Martin Legner	6	6
(Japan) Takahiro Hirate (Australia) David Latham	1	3
(Australia) Anthony Bonaccurso (Australia) Ben Weeks	1	2
(France) Stéphane Houdet (France) Michaël Jérémiasz	6	6
(Sweden) Niclas Rodhborn (United Kingdom) David Phillipson	4	2
2	(Netherlands) Robin Ammerlaan (Netherlands) Ronald Vink	6	6

Semifinals
1	(Japan) Shingo Kunieda (Japan) Satoshi Saida	6	6
(France) Frédéric Cattanéo (Austria) Martin Legner	0	2
(France) Stéphane Houdet (France) Michaël Jérémiasz	2	0
2	(Netherlands) Robin Ammerlaan (Netherlands) Ronald Vink	6	6

Finals
1	(Japan) Shingo Kunieda (Japan) Satoshi Saida	6	6
2	(Netherlands) Robin Ammerlaan (Netherlands) Ronald Vink	4	3
