= 2010 Australian Open – Wheelchair men's doubles =

Wheelchair men's doubles
- 2010 Australian Open

Final
- Champion: (France) Stéphane Houdet (Japan) Shingo Kunieda
- Runner-up: (Netherlands) Maikel Scheffers (Netherlands) Robin Ammerlaan
- Score: 6–2, 6–2

Events
Singles	men	women		boys	girls
Doubles	men	women	mixed	boys	girls
WC Singles	men	women	quad
WC Doubles	men	women	quad
Legends	men	women	mixed
← 2009 ·	Australian Open	· 2011 →

Three-time defending champion Shingo Kunieda and his partner Stéphane Houdet defeated the other defending champion Robin Ammerlaan and his partner Maikel Scheffers in the final, 6–2, 6–2 to win the men's doubles wheelchair tennis title at the 2010 Australian Open. With the win, Houdet completed a non-calendar-year Grand Slam and the career Super Slam.

== Seeds ==
1. (Netherlands) Maikel Scheffers / (Netherlands) Robin Ammerlaan (final)
2. (France) Stéphane Houdet / (Japan) Shingo Kunieda (champions)

== Draw ==
=== Key ===
- Q = Qualifier
- WC = Wild card
- LL = Lucky loser
- Alt = Alternate
- ITF = ITF entry
- PR = Protected ranking
- SR = Special ranking
- SE = Special exempt
- JE = Junior exempt
- JR = Junior Accelerator Programme entrant
- CO = College Accelerator Programme entrant
- NG = Next Gen Accelerator Program entrant
- w/o = Walkover
- r = Retired
- d = Defaulted

=== Finals ===
Semifinals
1	(Netherlands) Maikel Scheffers (Netherlands) Robin Ammerlaan	4	6	6
(Australia) Ben Weekes (Sweden) Stefan Olsson	6	4	2
(Japan) Satoshi Saida (Austria) Martin Legner	3	4
2	(France) Stéphane Houdet (Japan) Shingo Kunieda	6	6

Final
1	(Netherlands) Maikel Scheffers (Netherlands) Robin Ammerlaan	2	2
2	(France) Stéphane Houdet (Japan) Shingo Kunieda	6	6
