= 2010 Australian Open – Boys' doubles =

Boys' doubles
- 2010 Australian Open

Final
- Champion: (Netherlands) Justin Eleveld (Netherlands) Jannick Lupescu
- Runner-up: (Germany) Kevin Krawietz (Germany) Dominik Schulz
- Score: 6–4, 6–4

Events
Singles	men	women		boys	girls
Doubles	men	women	mixed	boys	girls
WC Singles	men	women	quad
WC Doubles	men	women	quad
Legends	men	women	mixed
- Australian Open

Francis Casey Alcantara and Hsieh Cheng-peng were the defending champions, but Hsieh did not compete in the Juniors this year.
Alcantara partnered up with Guilherme Clézar, but they lost in the second round 5–7, 6–4, [6–10] against Jason Kubler and Benjamin Mitchell.

Justin Eleveld and Jannick Lupescu won in the final 6–4, 6–4, against Kevin Krawietz and Dominik Schulz.

== Seeds ==
1. (Sweden) Daniel Berta / (Hungary) Márton Fucsovics (first round)
2. (Germany) Kevin Krawietz / (Germany) Dominik Schulz (final)
3. (Belgium) Arthur de Greef / (France) Gianni Mina (second round)
4. (Chinese Taipei) Huang Liang-chi / (Japan) Yasutaka Uchiyama (semifinals)
5. (United States) Mitchell Frank / (Finland) Micke Kontinen (first round)
6. (Slovakia) Filip Horanský / (Slovakia) Jozef Kovalík (second round)
7. (Australia) Jarryd Chaplin / (Australia) Ben Wagland (first round)
8. (Philippines) Francis Casey Alcantara / (Brazil) Guilherme Clézar (second round)

== Draw ==
Key

- Q = Qualifier
- WC = Wild card
- LL = Lucky loser
- Alt = Alternate
- ITF = ITF entry
- PR = Protected ranking
- SR = Special ranking
- SE = Special exempt
- JE = Junior exempt
- JR = Junior Accelerator Programme entrant
- CO = College Accelerator Programme entrant
- NG = Next Gen Accelerator Program entrant
- w/o = Walkover
- r = Retired
- d = Defaulted

=== Finals ===
Semifinals
(Netherlands) Justin Eleveld (Netherlands) Jannick Lupescu	6	6
WC	(Australia) Jason Kubler (Australia) Benjamin Mitchell	3	0
4	(Chinese Taipei) Huang Liang-chi (Japan) Yasutaka Uchiyama	3	6^{11}
2	(Germany) Kevin Krawietz (Germany) Dominik Schulz	6	7

Final
(Netherlands) Justin Eleveld (Netherlands) Jannick Lupescu	6	6
2	(Germany) Kevin Krawietz (Germany) Dominik Schulz	4	4

=== Top half ===
First round
1	(Sweden) Daniel Berta (Hungary) Márton Fucsovics	2	6^{7}
(Netherlands) Justin Eleveld (Netherlands) Jannick Lupescu	6	7
(France) Romain Arneodo (France) Mick Lescure	6	2	[10]
WC	(Australia) Luke Saville (Australia) Jack Schipanski	4	6	[8]
(Italy) Matteo Civarolo (Tunisia) Slim Hamza	6	7
(Sweden) Tobias Blömgren (Sweden) Robin Olin	1	6^{5}
(Brazil) Tiago Fernandes (Brazil) Bruno Semenzato	6	6
5	(United States) Mitchell Frank (Finland) Micke Kontinen	4	2
3	(Belgium) Arthur de Greef (France) Gianni Mina	3	6	[10]
(Canada) Pavel Krainik (Russia) Alexander Rumyantsev	6	2	[8]
(Latvia) Arturs Kazijevs (Latvia) Miķelis Lībietis	6	6
(Republic of Ireland) John Morrissey (Poland) Bartosz Sawicki	3	4
WC	(Australia) Jason Kubler (Australia) Benjamin Mitchell	6	6
(Mexico) Alexis Carlos (South Africa) Hernus Pieters	4	4
(South Korea) Lee Jea-moon (Poland) Maciej Smoła	4	3
8	(Philippines) Francis Casey Alcantara (Brazil) Guilherme Clézar	6	6

Second round
(Netherlands) J Eleveld (Netherlands) J Lupescu	6	6
(France) R Arneodo (France) M Lescure	3	3
(Italy) M Civarolo (Tunisia) S Hamza	7	3	[4]
(Brazil) T Fernandes (Brazil) B Semenzato	6^{3}	6	[10]
3	(Belgium) A de Greef (France) G Mina	2	4
(Latvia) A Kazijevs (Latvia) M Libietis	6	6
WC	(Australia) J Kubler (Australia) B Mitchell	5	6	[10]
8	(Philippines) FC Alcantara (Brazil) G Clézar	7	4	[6]

Quarterfinals
(Netherlands) J Eleveld (Netherlands) J Lupescu	7	6
(Brazil) T Fernandes (Brazil) B Semenzato	6^{2}	0
(Latvia) A Kazijevs (Latvia) M Libietis	6	6^{5}	[9]
WC	(Australia) J Kubler (Australia) B Mitchell	4	7	[11]

Semifinals
(Netherlands) J Eleveld (Netherlands) J Lupescu	6	6
WC	(Australia) J Kubler (Australia) B Mitchell	3	0

=== Bottom half ===
First round
6	(Slovakia) Filip Horanský (Slovakia) Jozef Kovalík	4	6	[10]
WC	(Australia) Joey Swaysland (Australia) Andrew Whittington	6	4	[6]
(Russia) Victor Baluda (Russia) Richard Muzaev	7	6
(France) Cédrick Commin (United Kingdom) Oliver Golding	5	3
(New Zealand) Barrett Franks (New Zealand) Jaden Grinter	3	3
(Republic of Ireland) Sam Barry (New Zealand) Ben McLachlan	6	6
(India) Vaidik Munshaw (China) Wang Chuhan	2	6^{3}
4	(Chinese Taipei) Huang Liang-chi (Japan) Yasutaka Uchiyama	6	7
7	(Australia) Jarryd Chaplin (Australia) Ben Wagland	2	2
(Sweden) Kalle Averfalk (Germany) Leandro Toledo	6	6
(South Korea) Jeong Suk-young (South Korea) Na Jung-woong	1	3
(United Kingdom) Tom Allen (United Kingdom) Jack Carpenter	6	6
(Czech Republic) Robert Rumler (Czech Republic) Jiří Veselý	2	6	[13]
(United States) Nick Chappell (Russia) Vladislav Dubinsky	6	3	[11]
WC	(Australia) James Frawley (Australia) Nick Kyrgios	3	5
2	(Germany) Kevin Krawietz (Germany) Dominik Schulz	6	7

Second round
6	(Slovakia) F Horanský (Slovakia) J Kovalík	6^{8}	6	[7]
(Russia) V Baluda (Russia) R Muzaev	7	4	[10]
(Republic of Ireland) S Barry (New Zealand) B McLachlan	3	3
4	(Chinese Taipei) L-c Huang (Japan) Y Uchiyama	6	6
(Sweden) K Averfalk (Germany) L Toledo	2	3
(United Kingdom) T Allen (United Kingdom) J Carpenter	6	6
(Czech Republic) R Rumler (Czech Republic) J Veselý	6^{4}	6^{6}
2	(Germany) K Krawietz (Germany) D Schulz	7	7

Quarterfinals
(Russia) V Baluda (Russia) R Muzaev	6	6^{3}	[6]
4	(Chinese Taipei) L-c Huang (Japan) Y Uchiyama	3	7	[10]
(United Kingdom) T Allen (United Kingdom) J Carpenter	3	0
2	(Germany) K Krawietz (Germany) D Schulz	6	6

Semifinals
4	(Chinese Taipei) L-c Huang (Japan) Y Uchiyama	3	6^{11}
2	(Germany) K Krawietz (Germany) D Schulz	6	7
