= 2010 Australian Open – Wheelchair quad doubles =

Wheelchair quad doubles
- 2010 Australian Open

Final
- Champions: (United States) Nicholas Taylor (United States) David Wagner
- Runners-up: (United Kingdom) Peter Norfolk (Sweden) Johan Andersson
- Score: 6–2, 7–6^{(7–5)}

Events
Singles	men	women		boys	girls
Doubles	men	women	mixed	boys	girls
WC Singles	men	women	quad
WC Doubles	men	women	quad
Legends	men	women	mixed
- Australian Open

Two-time defending champions Nicholas Taylor and David Wagner defeated Peter Norfolk and Johan Andersson in the final, 6–2, 7–6^{(7–5)} to win the quad doubles wheelchair tennis title at the 2010 Australian Open.

== Main draw ==
Key

- Q = Qualifier
- WC = Wild card
- LL = Lucky loser
- Alt = Alternate
- ITF = ITF entry
- PR = Protected ranking
- SR = Special ranking
- SE = Special exempt
- JE = Junior exempt
- JR = Junior Accelerator Programme entrant
- CO = College Accelerator Programme entrant
- NG = Next Gen Accelerator Program entrant
- w/o = Walkover
- r = Retired
- d = Defaulted

=== Finals ===
Finals
(United States) Nicholas Taylor (United States) David Wagner	6	7
(United Kingdom) Peter Norfolk (Sweden) Johan Andersson	2	6^{5}
