= 2010 Australian Open – Wheelchair quad singles =

Wheelchair quad singles
- 2010 Australian Open

Final
- Champion: (United Kingdom) Peter Norfolk
- Runner-up: (United States) David Wagner
- Score: 6–2, 7–6^{(7–4)}

Events
Singles	men	women		boys	girls
Doubles	men	women	mixed	boys	girls
WC Singles	men	women	quad
WC Doubles	men	women	quad
Legends	men	women	mixed
- Australian Open

Two-time defending champion Peter Norfolk defeated David Wagner in the final, 6–2, 7–6^{(7–4)} to win the quad singles wheelchair tennis title at the 2010 Australian Open.

== Draw ==
=== Final ===
Final
(United Kingdom) Peter Norfolk	6	7
(United States) David Wagner	2	6^{4}

=== Round robin ===
	(United Kingdom) Norfolk	(United States) Wagner	(Sweden) Andersson	(United States) Taylor	RR; W–L	Set; W–L	Game; W–L	Standings
(United Kingdom) Peter Norfolk		6–2, 0–6, 6–3	6–1, 6–2	6–0, 6–0	3–0	6–1	36–14	1
(United States) David Wagner	2–6, 6–0, 3–6		7–6^{(7–5)}, 7–5	6–0, 6–0	2–1	5–2	37–23	2
(Sweden) Johan Andersson	1–6, 2–6	6–7^{(5–7)}, 5–7		3–6, 0–6	0–3	0–6	17–38	4
(United States) Nicholas Taylor	0–6, 0–6	0–6, 0–6	6–3, 6–0		1–2	2–4	12–27	3

Standings are determined by: 1. number of wins; 2. number of matches; 3. in two-players-ties, head-to-head records; 4. in three-players-ties, percentage of sets won, or of games won; 5. steering-committee decision.
