= 2010 Australian Open – Wheelchair men's singles =

Wheelchair men's singles
- 2010 Australian Open

Final
- Champion: (Japan) Shingo Kunieda
- Runner-up: (France) Stéphane Houdet
- Score: 7–6^{(7–3)}, 2–6, 7–5

Events
Singles	men	women		boys	girls
Doubles	men	women	mixed	boys	girls
WC Singles	men	women	quad
WC Doubles	men	women	quad
Legends	men	women	mixed
- Australian Open

Three-time defending champion Shingo Kunieda defeated Stéphane Houdet in the final, 7–6^{(7–3)}, 2–6, 7–5 to win the men's singles wheelchair tennis title at the 2010 Australian Open. It was his fourth Australian Open singles title and ninth major singles title overall.

== Seeds ==
1. (Japan) Shingo Kunieda (champion)
2. (France) Stéphane Houdet (final)

== Draw ==
Key

- Q = Qualifier
- WC = Wild card
- LL = Lucky loser
- Alt = Alternate
- ITF = ITF entry
- PR = Protected ranking
- SR = Special ranking
- SE = Special exempt
- JE = Junior exempt
- JR = Junior Accelerator Programme entrant
- CO = College Accelerator Programme entrant
- NG = Next Gen Accelerator Program entrant
- w/o = Walkover
- r = Retired
- d = Defaulted

=== Finals ===
Quarterfinals
1	(Japan) Shingo Kunieda	6	6
(Japan) Satoshi Saida	0	3
(Sweden) Stefan Olsson	5	2
(Netherlands) Robin Ammerlaan	7	6
(Austria) Martin Legner	6	6
(Australia) Ben Weekes	2	2
(Netherlands) Maikel Scheffers	2	4
2	(France) Stéphane Houdet	6	6

Semifinals
1	(Japan) Shingo Kunieda	6	6
(Netherlands) Robin Ammerlaan	4	3
(Austria) Martin Legner	2	0
2	(France) Stéphane Houdet	6	6

Final
1	(Japan) Shingo Kunieda	7	2	7
2	(France) Stéphane Houdet	6^{3}	6	5
