= 2008 Australian Open – Mixed doubles =

Mixed doubles
- 2008 Australian Open

Final
- Champions: (China) Sun Tiantian (Serbia) Nenad Zimonjić
- Runners-up: (India) Sania Mirza (India) Mahesh Bhupathi
- Score: 7–6^{(7–4)}, 6–4

Details
- Draw: 32
- Seeds: 8

Events
Singles	men	women		boys	girls
Doubles	men	women	mixed	boys	girls
WC Singles	men	women	quad
WC Doubles	men	women	quad
Legends	men	women	mixed
- Australian Open

Sun Tiantian and Nenad Zimonjić won the mixed doubles title at the 2008 Australian Open, defeating Sania Mirza and Mahesh Bhupathi in the final 7–6^{(7–4)}, 6–4.

Elena Likhovtseva and Daniel Nestor were the defending champions, but Likhovtseva did not participate in this Australian Open. Nestor partnered with Zheng Jie, but lost in the first round to Chan Yung-jan and Eric Butorac.

== Seeds ==
1. (Zimbabwe) Cara Black / (Australia) Paul Hanley (quarterfinals)
2. (United States) Lisa Raymond / (Sweden) Simon Aspelin (second round)
3. (China) Yan Zi / (The Bahamas) Mark Knowles (semifinals)
4. (China) Zheng Jie / (Canada) Daniel Nestor (first round)
5. (China) Sun Tiantian / (Serbia) Nenad Zimonjić (champions)
6. (Chinese Taipei) Chuang Chia-jung / (Israel) Jonathan Erlich (quarterfinals)
7. (Czech Republic) Květa Peschke / (Czech Republic) Martin Damm (quarterfinals)
8. (France) Nathalie Dechy / (Israel) Andy Ram (semifinals)

== Draw ==
Key

- Q = Qualifier
- WC = Wild card
- LL = Lucky loser
- Alt = Alternate
- ITF = ITF entry
- PR = Protected ranking
- SR = Special ranking
- SE = Special exempt
- JE = Junior exempt
- JR = Junior Accelerator Programme entrant
- CO = College Accelerator Programme entrant
- NG = Next Gen Accelerator Program entrant
- w/o = Walkover
- r = Retired
- d = Defaulted

=== Finals ===
Semifinals
5	(China) Sun Tiantian (Serbia) Nenad Zimonjić	4	7	[10]
3	(China) Yan Zi (The Bahamas) Mark Knowles	6	5	[6]
8	(France) Nathalie Dechy (Israel) Andy Ram	4	2
(India) Sania Mirza (India) Mahesh Bhupathi	6	6

Final
5	(China) Sun Tiantian (Serbia) Nenad Zimonjić	7^{7}	6
(India) Sania Mirza (India) Mahesh Bhupathi	6^{4}	4

=== Top half ===
First round
1	(Zimbabwe) C Black (Australia) P Hanley	7^{7}	6
(United States) B Mattek (Australia) J Kerr	6^{5}	2
WC	(Australia) J Moore (Australia) G Jones	4	6	[10]
(Australia) R Stubbs (Australia) T Perry	6	4	[4]
(Spain) A Medina Garrigues (Argentina) M García	5	6^{3}
(United States) L Huber (United Kingdom) J Murray	7	7^{7}
(United States) V King (Zimbabwe) K Ullyett	1	3
5	(China) T Sun (Serbia) N Zimonjić	6	6
3	(China) Z Yan (The Bahamas) M Knowles	6	3	[10]
(Czech Republic) V Uhlířová (South Africa) J Coetzee	3	6	[6]
(Belarus) V Azarenka (Belarus) M Mirnyi	3	6^{4}
(United States) M Tu (Poland) M Matkowski	6	7^{7}
(Hungary) Á Szávay (India) L Paes	2	6	[10]
(Czech Republic) R Voráčová (Czech Republic) D Škoch	6	2	[6]
WC	(Australia) J Gajdosova (Australia) S Groth	6	1	r
6	(Chinese Taipei) C-j Chuang (Israel) J Erlich	4	4

Second round
1	(Zimbabwe) C Black (Australia) P Hanley	6	6
WC	(Australia) J Moore (Australia) G Jones	1	1
(United States) L Huber (United Kingdom) J Murray	2	4
5	(China) T Sun (Serbia) N Zimonjić	6	6
3	(China) Z Yan (The Bahamas) M Knowles	7	6
(United States) M Tu (Poland) M Matkowski	5	2
(Hungary) Á Szávay (India) L Paes
6	(Chinese Taipei) C-j Chuang (Israel) J Erlich	w/o

Quarterfinals
1	(Zimbabwe) C Black (Australia) P Hanley	6	6^{7}	[8]
5	(China) T Sun (Serbia) N Zimonjić	4	7^{9}	[10]
3	(China) Z Yan (The Bahamas) M Knowles	6	6
6	(Chinese Taipei) C-j Chuang (Israel) J Erlich	4	4

Semifinals
5	(China) T Sun (Serbia) N Zimonjić	4	7	[10]
3	(China) Z Yan (The Bahamas) M Knowles	6	5	[6]

=== Bottom half ===
First round
8	(France) N Dechy (Israel) A Ram	6	6
WC	(Australia) S Ferguson (Australia) A Feeney	3	4
(Slovakia) J Husárová (Poland) M Fyrstenberg	6	7
(Austria) T Paszek (Brazil) M Melo	3	5
(France) V Razzano (United States) A Roddick	6	6
WC	(Australia) M Adamczak (Australia) S Huss	4	2
(Chinese Taipei) Y-j Chan (United States) E Butorac	7	7^{7}
4	(China) J Zheng (Canada) D Nestor	5	6^{1}
7	(Czech Republic) K Peschke (Czech Republic) M Damm	6	7^{7}
WC	(Australia) I Holland (Australia) B Klein	1	6^{5}
Alt	(Czech Republic) Z Ondrášková (Czech Republic) P Frelich	0	1
Alt	(Russia) G Voskoboeva (Czech Republic) F Čermák	6	6
WC	(Australia) A Molik (Australia) N Healey	1	4
(India) S Mirza (India) M Bhupathi	6	6
(Czech Republic) I Benešová (Czech Republic) L Friedl	4	2
2	(United States) L Raymond (Sweden) S Aspelin	6	6

Second round
8	(France) N Dechy (Israel) A Ram	6	5	[10]
(Slovakia) J Husárová (Poland) M Fyrstenberg	3	7	[4]
(France) V Razzano (United States) A Roddick	6	5	[5]
(Chinese Taipei) Y-j Chan (United States) E Butorac	1	7	[10]
7	(Czech Republic) K Peschke (Czech Republic) M Damm	6	6
Alt	(Russia) G Voskoboeva (Czech Republic) F Čermák	1	1
(India) S Mirza (India) M Bhupathi	6	2	[10]
2	(United States) L Raymond (Sweden) S Aspelin	3	6	[7]

Quarterfinals
8	(France) N Dechy (Israel) A Ram	6	6
(Chinese Taipei) Y-j Chan (United States) E Butorac	1	2
7	(Czech Republic) K Peschke (Czech Republic) M Damm
(India) S Mirza (India) M Bhupathi	w/o

Semifinals
8	(France) N Dechy (Israel) A Ram	4	2
(India) S Mirza (India) M Bhupathi	6	6
