= 2010 Australian Open – Mixed doubles =

Mixed doubles
- 2010 Australian Open

Final
- Champions: (Zimbabwe) Cara Black (India) Leander Paes
- Runners-up: (Russia) Ekaterina Makarova (Czech Republic) Jaroslav Levinský
- Score: 7–5, 6–3

Details
- Draw: 32
- Seeds: 8

Events
Singles	men	women		boys	girls
Doubles	men	women	mixed	boys	girls
WC Singles	men	women	quad
WC Doubles	men	women	quad
Legends	men	women	mixed
- Australian Open

Sania Mirza and Mahesh Bhupathi were the defending champions, but withdrew before their first round match against Carly Gullickson and Bernard Tomic. They were replaced in the draw by Akgul Amanmuradova and Rik de Voest.

Cara Black and Leander Paes won the mixed doubles title at the 2010 Australian Open, defeating Ekaterina Makarova and Jaroslav Levinský in the final 7–5, 6–3.

== Seeds ==
1. (Zimbabwe) Cara Black / (India) Leander Paes (champions)
2. (Slovakia) Daniela Hantuchová / (Canada) Daniel Nestor (second round, withdrew)
3. (United States) Bethanie Mattek-Sands / (United States) Bob Bryan (second round)
4. (Spain) Nuria Llagostera Vives / (Slovakia) Michal Mertiňák (first round)
5. (Russia) Maria Kirilenko / (Serbia) Nenad Zimonjić (first round)
6. (Russia) Alisa Kleybanova / (Belarus) Max Mirnyi (second round)
7. (United States) Lisa Raymond / (South Africa) Wesley Moodie (semifinals)
8. (Russia) Elena Vesnina / (Israel) Andy Ram (quarterfinals)

== Draw ==
Key

- Q = Qualifier
- WC = Wild card
- LL = Lucky loser
- Alt = Alternate
- ITF = ITF entry
- PR = Protected ranking
- SR = Special ranking
- SE = Special exempt
- JE = Junior exempt
- JR = Junior Accelerator Programme entrant
- CO = College Accelerator Programme entrant
- NG = Next Gen Accelerator Program entrant
- w/o = Walkover
- r = Retired
- d = Defaulted

=== Finals ===
Semifinals
1	(Zimbabwe) Cara Black (India) Leander Paes	6^{6}	7	[10]
7	(United States) Lisa Raymond (South Africa) Wesley Moodie	7	6^{5}	[7]
(Italy) Flavia Pennetta (Brazil) Marcelo Melo	0	6	[8]
(Russia) Ekaterina Makarova (Czech Republic) Jaroslav Levinský	6	4	[10]

Final
1	(Zimbabwe) Cara Black (India) Leander Paes	7	6
(Russia) Ekaterina Makarova (Czech Republic) Jaroslav Levinský	5	3

=== Top half ===
First round
1	(Zimbabwe) C Black (India) L Paes	7	7
WC	(Australia) S Ferguson (Australia) C Ball	5	5
Alt	(Uzbekistan) A Amanmuradova (South Africa) R de Voest	7	6
WC	(United States) C Gullickson (Australia) B Tomic	5	2
(Germany) A-L Grönefeld (Germany) C Kas	7	6
WC	(Australia) S Peers (Australia) P Luczak	5	4
WC	(Australia) A Molik (Australia) M Ebden	0	3
8	(Russia) E Vesnina (Israel) A Ram	6	6
3	(United States) B Mattek-Sands (United States) B Bryan	6	4	[10]
(Chinese Taipei) S-w Hsieh (Brazil) B Soares	2	6	[7]
(United States) L Huber (United Kingdom) R Hutchins	2	4
(Chinese Taipei) C-j Chuang (Slovakia) F Polášek	6	6
(Czech Republic) I Benešová (Czech Republic) L Dlouhý	6	7
(China) Z Yan (Poland) M Fyrstenberg	4	6^{2}
(Spain) V Ruano Pascual (Australia) S Huss	3	0
7	(United States) L Raymond (South Africa) W Moodie	6	6

Second round
1	(Zimbabwe) C Black (India) L Paes	6	6
Alt	(Uzbekistan) A Amanmuradova (South Africa) R de Voest	4	2
(Germany) A-L Grönefeld (Germany) C Kas	6	5	[6]
8	(Russia) E Vesnina (Israel) A Ram	3	7	[10]
3	(United States) B Mattek-Sands (United States) B Bryan	5	6^{4}
(Chinese Taipei) C-j Chuang (Slovakia) F Polášek	7	7
(Czech Republic) I Benešová (Czech Republic) L Dlouhý	1	4
7	(United States) L Raymond (South Africa) W Moodie	6	6

Quarterfinals
1	(Zimbabwe) C Black (India) L Paes	6	6
8	(Russia) E Vesnina (Israel) A Ram	4	3
(Chinese Taipei) C-j Chuang (Slovakia) F Polášek	3	6	[10]
7	(United States) L Raymond (South Africa) W Moodie	6	3	[12]

Semifinals
1	(Zimbabwe) C Black (India) L Paes	6^{6}	7	[10]
7	(United States) L Raymond (South Africa) W Moodie	7	6^{5}	[7]

=== Bottom half ===
First round
6	(Russia) A Kleybanova (Belarus) M Mirnyi	6	3	[10]
WC	(Australia) A Rodionova (Australia) P Hanley	3	6	[3]
(Czech Republic) B Záhlavová-Strýcová (Austria) O Marach	6	7
(Australia) R Stubbs (United States) T Parrott	3	5
(Romania) M Niculescu (Austria) J Knowle	4	3
(Italy) F Pennetta (Brazil) M Melo	6	6
WC	(Australia) J Groth (Australia) S Groth	7	7
4	(Spain) N Llagostera Vives (Slovakia) M Mertiňák	6^{5}	6^{4}
5	(Russia) M Kirilenko (Serbia) N Zimonjić	3	6	[9]
(United States) R Kops-Jones (Belgium) D Norman	6	3	[11]
WC	(Australia) C Dellacqua (Australia) J Kerr	3	6	[8]
(Czech Republic) L Hradecká (Czech Republic) F Čermák	6	2	[10]
(Czech Republic) K Peschke (Poland) M Matkowski	4	7	[6]
(Russia) E Makarova (Czech Republic) J Levinský	6	5	[10]
(Spain) A Medina Garrigues (Brazil) A Sá	3	6	[6]
2	(Slovakia) D Hantuchová (Canada) D Nestor	6	3	[10]

Second round
6	(Russia) A Kleybanova (Belarus) M Mirnyi	6	3	[7]
(Czech Republic) B Záhlavová-Strýcová (Austria) O Marach	3	6	[10]
(Italy) F Pennetta (Brazil) M Melo	6	6
WC	(Australia) J Groth (Australia) S Groth	2	3
(United States) R Kops-Jones (Belgium) D Norman
(Czech Republic) L Hradecká (Czech Republic) F Čermák	w/o
(Russia) E Makarova (Czech Republic) J Levinský
2	(Slovakia) D Hantuchová (Canada) D Nestor	w/o

Quarterfinals
(Czech Republic) B Záhlavová-Strýcová (Austria) O Marach	4	4
(Italy) F Pennetta (Brazil) M Melo	6	6
(United States) R Kops-Jones (Belgium) D Norman	4	6^{3}
(Russia) E Makarova (Czech Republic) J Levinský	6	7

Semifinals
(Italy) F Pennetta (Brazil) M Melo	0	6	[8]
(Russia) E Makarova (Czech Republic) J Levinský	6	4	[10]
