= Justin Eleveld =

Dutch tennis player (born 1992)

- Country (sports): Netherlands
- Born: 26 May 1992 (age 33) Enschede, Netherlands
- Plays: Right-handed (two-handed backhand)
- Prize money: $10,520

Singles
- Career record: 0–0
- Career titles: 0
- Highest ranking: No. 828 (1 November 2010)
- Current ranking: No. 971 (20 January 2020)

Doubles
- Career record: 0–0
- Career titles: 0
- Highest ranking: No. 1366 (10 February 2020)
- Current ranking: No. 1367 (2 March 2020)
- Last updated on: 7 March 2020.

Justin Eleveld (born 26 May 1992) is a Dutch tennis player.

Eleveld has a career high ATP singles ranking of 828 achieved on 1 November 2010. He also has a career high ATP doubles ranking of 1366 achieved on 10 February 2020.

Eleveld won the 2010 Australian Open boys' doubles title, partnering Jannick Lupescu. They defeated Kevin Krawietz and Dominik Schulz in the final. Eleveld had a career high junior ranking of 24, achieved in 2010.

== Sexual abuse revelations ==
In a December 2025 interview, Eleveld revealed he had been sexually abused as a 15-year old by the mother of his host family in France. Fear and stress from that period finally cut short his tennis career.

== Junior Grand Slam finals ==
=== Doubles ===
Result	Year	Championship	Surface	Partner	Opponents	Score
Win	2010	Australian Open	Hard	(Netherlands) Jannick Lupescu	(Germany) Kevin Krawietz (Germany) Dominik Schulz	6–4, 6–4
