= 2008 Australian Open – Wheelchair men's singles =

Wheelchair men's singles
- 2008 Australian Open

Final
- Champion: (Japan) Shingo Kunieda
- Runner-up: (France) Michaël Jérémiasz
- Score: 6–1, 6–4

Events
Singles	men	women		boys	girls
Doubles	men	women	mixed	boys	girls
WC Singles	men	women	quad
WC Doubles	men	women	quad
Legends	men	women	mixed
- Australian Open

Defending champion Shingo Kunieda defeated Michaël Jérémiasz in the final, 6–1, 6–4 to win the men's singles wheelchair tennis title at the 2008 Australian Open. It was his second Australian Open singles title and fourth major singles title overall.

== Seeds ==
1. (Japan) Shingo Kunieda (champion)
2. (Netherlands) Robin Ammerlaan (semifinals)

== Draw ==
Key

- Q = Qualifier
- WC = Wild card
- LL = Lucky loser
- Alt = Alternate
- ITF = ITF entry
- PR = Protected ranking
- SR = Special ranking
- SE = Special exempt
- JE = Junior exempt
- JR = Junior Accelerator Programme entrant
- CO = College Accelerator Programme entrant
- NG = Next Gen Accelerator Program entrant
- w/o = Walkover
- r = Retired
- d = Defaulted

=== Finals ===
Semifinals
1	(Japan) Shingo Kunieda	6	6
(France) Stéphane Houdet	0	3
(France) Michaël Jérémiasz	4	6	6
2	(Netherlands) Robin Ammerlaan	6	1	0

Finals
1	(Japan) Shingo Kunieda	6	6
(France) Michaël Jérémiasz	1	4

=== Section 1 ===
First round
(Australia) D Latham	1	2
(France) N Peifer	6	6
(United States) J Rydberg	6	6
(Australia) A Bonnaccurso	1	4
(Netherlands) E Stuurman	6	6
(Japan) T Hirate	0	0
(Chile) R Mendez	6	2	2
(United Kingdom) D Phillipson	4	6	6

Second round
1	(Japan) S Kunieda	6	6
(France) M Peifer	1	1
(United States) J Rydberg	6	0	2
(Netherlands) M Scheffers	3	6	6
(France) S Houdet	6	6
(Netherlands) E Stuurman	1	2
(United Kingdom) D Phillipson	1	6^{2}
(Austria) M Legner	6	7

Quarterfinals
1	(Japan) S Kunieda	6	6
(Netherlands) M Scheffers	1	0
(France) S Houdet	6	6^{2}	6
(Austria) M Legner	1	7^{7}	4

Semifinals
1	(Japan) S Kunieda	6	6
(France) S Houdet	0	3

=== Section 2 ===
First round
(Germany) S Sommerfield	6	6
(Australia) M Dobbie	1	2
(Poland) T Kruszelnicki	4	6	6
(Australia) B Weekes	6	2	1
(Sweden) N Larsson	2	2
(Japan) Y Fujimoto	6	6
(United States) T Lara	0	1
(France) F Cattanéo	6	6

Second round
(Japan) S Saida	6	6
(Germany) S Sommerfield	0	3
(Poland) T Kruszelnicki	3	2
(France) M Jérémiasz	6	6
(Netherlands) R Vink	6	6
(Japan) Y Fujimoto	1	2
(France) F Cattanéo	0	3
2	(Netherlands) R Amerlaan	6	6

Quarterfinals
(Japan) S Saida	3	3
(France) M Jérémiasz	6	6
(Netherlands) R Vink	4	0
2	(Netherlands) R Amerlaan	6	6

Semifinals
(France) M Jérémiasz	4	6	6
2	(Netherlands) R Amerlaan	6	1	0
