= Jade Curtis =

British tennis player

- Country (sports): United Kingdom
- Born: 2 May 1990 (age 34); Oxford, England
- Turned pro: 2004
- Retired: 2015
- Plays: Right-handed (two-handed backhand)
- Prize money: $50,110

Singles
- Career record: 87–85
- Career titles: 0
- Highest ranking: 325 (15 February 2010)

Grand Slam singles results
- Wimbledon: Q1 (2005, 2009)

Doubles
- Career record: 64–63
- Career titles: 4 ITF
- Highest ranking: 230 (21 September 2009)

Grand Slam doubles results
- Wimbledon: 1R (2007, 2009)

Jade Curtis (born 2 May 1990 in Oxford) is a retired British tennis player.

Curtis won four doubles titles on the ITF Circuit in her career. On 15 February 2010, she reached her best singles ranking of world number 325. On 21 September 2009, she peaked at world number 230 in the doubles rankings.

Curtis competed in the main draw of the Wimbledon doubles in 2007 and 2009, losing in the first round.

She started playing tennis at the age of seven. Her favourite surface is hardcourt.

Curtis retired from tennis in 2015.

== ITF Circuit finals ==
=== Singles: 1 (runner-up) ===
Legend $100,000 tournaments $75,000 tournaments $50,000 tournaments $25,000 tournaments $10,000 tournaments	Finals by surface Hard (0–0) Clay (0–0) Grass (0–1) Carpet (0–0)

Result	No.	Date	Tournament	Surface	Opponent	Score
Loss	1.	21 July 2007	ITF Frinton, United Kingdom	Grass	(United Kingdom) Sarah Borwell	4–6, 6–1, 3–6

=== Doubles: (4 titles, 7 runner-ups) ===
Legend $100,000 tournaments $75,000 tournaments $50,000 tournaments $25,000 tournaments $10,000 tournaments	Finals by surface Hard (2–5) Clay (1–0) Grass (0–2) Carpet (1–0)

Outcome	No.	Date	Tournament	Surface	Partner	Opponents	Score
Winner	1.	14 August 2006	Nottingham, England	Hard	(Spain) Jessica Beaumont	(France) Marie-Perine Baudouin (United Kingdom) Claire Peterzan	6–2, 6–3
Runner-up	1.	10 July 2007	Felixstowe, United Kingdom	Grass	(United Kingdom) Rebecca Llewellyn	(United Kingdom) Karen Paterson (United Kingdom) Melanie South	3–6, 3–6
Runner-up	2.	19 October 2007	Gympie, Australia	Hard	(Australia) Monique Adamczak	(United States) Courtney Nagle (United States) Robin Stephenson	4–6, 1–6
Winner	2.	14 April 2008	Fuerteventura, Spain	Carpet	(Spain) Irene Rehberger Bescos	(Italy) Benedetta Davato (Italy) Giulia Gatto-Monticone	6–3, 7–6 ^{(8–6)}
Winner	3.	11 May 2008	Edinburgh, United Kingdom	Clay	(United Kingdom) Elizabeth Thomas	(Bulgaria) Biljana Pawlowa-Dimitrova (Belgium) Soetkin Van Deun	6–1, 7–6 ^{(7–5)}
Runner-up	3.	14 July 2008	Frinton, United Kingdom	Grass	(United Kingdom) Elizabeth Thomas	(Australia) Tammi Patterson (Australia) Emelyn Starr	3–6, 5–7
Runner-up	4.	24 November 2008	Perth, Australia	Hard	(Chinese Taipei) Hwang I-hsuan	(United States) Alexis Prousis (United States) Robin Stephenson	6–7^{(3–7)}, 6–7^{(4–7)}
Runner-up	5.	5 December 2008	Sorrento, Italy	Hard	(Hong Kong) Zhang Ling	(Australia) Tyra Calderwood (Australia) Shannon Golds	4–6, 6–3, [8–10]
Runner-up	6.	28 July 2009	Vigo, Spain	Hard	(United Kingdom) Georgie Gent	(Poland) Karolina Kosińska (France) Laura Thorpe	6–7^{(3–7)}, 2–6
Winner	4.	31 August 2009	Tsukuba, Japan	Hard	(Bolivia) María Fernanda Álvarez Terán	(Chinese Taipei) Hsu Wen-hsin (Japan) Mari Tanaka	1–6, 6–2, [10–2]
Runner-up	7.	17 March 2010	Bath, England	Hard (i)	(United Kingdom) Anna Fitzpatrick	(Denmark) Malou Ejdesgaard (Poland) Katarzyna Piter	3–6, 2–6
