= Florence Gravellier =

French wheelchair tennis player

- Full name: Florence Alix-Gravellier
- Country (sports): France
- Born: 23 January 1979 (age 46) Bordeaux, France
- Retired: 2010
- Plays: Right handed

Singles
- Career record: 319–167
- Highest ranking: No. 2 (2006)

Grand Slam singles results
- Australian Open: F (2007, 2010)
- French Open: F (2007)
- US Open: F (2007)

Other tournaments
- Masters: F (2005)
- Paralympic Games: Bronze Medal (2008)

Doubles
- Career record: 197–124
- Highest ranking: No. 1 (2005)

Grand Slam doubles results
- Australian Open: W (2005, 2010)
- French Open: F (2007)
- Wimbledon: SF (2009, 2010)
- US Open: F (2009)

Other doubles tournaments
- Masters Doubles: F (2005, 2008)
- Paralympic Games: Bronze Medal (2008)
- Last updated on: 7 July 2013.

Florence Gravellier (born 23 January 1979) is a former French wheelchair tennis player. Gravellier is the 2005 and 2010 Australian Open doubles Champion. At the 2008 Paralympic Games in Beijing, Gravellier was a double bronze medalist. Gravellier is a former world number one in the Women's doubles.

Preceded by Esther Vergeer	Year End Number 1 – Doubles Award; 2005	Succeeded by Jiske Griffioen
