= List of Grand Slam and related tennis records =

These are records for Grand Slam tournaments, also known as Majors, which are the four most prestigious annual tennis events: Australian Open, French Open, Wimbledon, and US Open. All records are based on official data from the majors. In the case of ties, players are listed in chronological order of reaching the record. The names of active players appear in boldface for their career totals and currently active streaks.

== Singles career totals (all time) ==
=== Men's singles ===
Active players in boldface.

#	Titles
24	**Novak Djokovic**
22	Rafael Nadal
20	Roger Federer
14	Pete Sampras
12	Roy Emerson
11	Rod Laver
11	Björn Borg
10	Bill Tilden
8	Fred Perry
8	Ken Rosewall
8	Jimmy Connors
8	Ivan Lendl
8	Andre Agassi

#	Finals
38	**Novak Djokovic**
31	Roger Federer
30	Rafael Nadal
19	Ivan Lendl
18	Pete Sampras
17	Rod Laver
16	Ken Rosewall
16	Björn Borg
15	Bill Tilden
15	Roy Emerson
15	Jimmy Connors
15	Andre Agassi

#	Semifinals
55	**Novak Djokovic**
46	Roger Federer
38	Rafael Nadal
31	Jimmy Connors
28	Ivan Lendl
26	Andre Agassi
25	Ken Rosewall
23	Pete Sampras
21	Andy Murray
20	Bill Tilden

#	Quarterfinals
66	**Novak Djokovic**
58	Roger Federer
47	Rafael Nadal
41	Jimmy Connors
37	Roy Emerson
36	Andre Agassi
34	/ Ivan Lendl
30	Ken Rosewall
30	Andy Murray
29	Pete Sampras

#	Match wins
409	**Novak Djokovic**
369	Roger Federer
314	Rafael Nadal
233	Jimmy Connors
224	Andre Agassi
222	/ Ivan Lendl
210	Roy Emerson
203	Pete Sampras
200	Andy Murray
minimum 200 wins

%	W–L	Match record
89.76	114–13	Bill Tilden
89.24	141–17	Björn Borg
87.71	314–44	Rafael Nadal
87.39	409–59	**Novak Djokovic**
87.07	101–15	Fred Perry
86.01	369–60	Roger Federer
84.23	203–38	Pete Sampras
83.41	171–34	Ken Rosewall
82.94	141–29	Rod Laver
82.62	233–49	Jimmy Connors
minimum 100 wins

=== Women's singles ===
#	Titles
24	Margaret Court
23	Serena Williams
22	Steffi Graf
19	Helen Wills
18	Chris Evert
18	/ Martina Navratilova
12	Billie Jean King
9	Maureen Connolly
9	// Monica Seles
8	/ Molla Mallory
8	Suzanne Lenglen

#	Finals
34	Chris Evert
33	Serena Williams
32	/ Martina Navratilova
31	Steffi Graf
29	Margaret Court
22	Helen Wills
18	Doris Hart
18	Billie Jean King
18	Evonne Goolagong Cawley
16	Helen Jacobs
16	Venus Williams

#	Semifinals
52	Chris Evert
44	/ Martina Navratilova
40	Serena Williams
37	Steffi Graf
36	Margaret Court
26	Doris Hart
26	Billie Jean King
25	Louise Brough
24	Helen Jacobs
23	Venus Williams

#	Quarterfinals
54	Chris Evert
54	Serena Williams
53	/ Martina Navratilova
43	Margaret Court
42	Steffi Graf
40	Billie Jean King
39	Venus Williams
35	Arantxa Sánchez Vicario
32	Doris Hart
31	Helen Jacobs
31	// Monica Seles
31	Lindsay Davenport

#	Match wins
367	Serena Williams
306	/ Martina Navratilova
299	Chris Evert
278	Steffi Graf
271	Venus Williams
210	Arantxa Sánchez Vicario
207	Margaret Court
198	Lindsay Davenport
197	Maria Sharapova
190	Billie Jean King

== Most singles titles (all time) ==
AO Australian Open	WIM Wimbledon
FO French Open	USO US Open

Note:Active players and tournament records indicated in bold.

=== Men ===
Titles	Player	AO	FO	WIM	USO	Years
24	(Serbia) **Novak Djokovic**	**10**	3	7	4	2008–2023
22	(Spain) Rafael Nadal	2	**14**	2	4	2005–2022
20	(Switzerland) Roger Federer	6	1	**8**	5	2003–2018
14	(United States) Pete Sampras	2	0	7	5	1990–2002
12	(Australia) Roy Emerson	6	2	2	2	1961–1967
11	(Australia) Rod Laver	3	2	4	2	1960–1969
11	(Sweden) Björn Borg	0	6	5	0	1974–1981
10	(United States) Bill Tilden	0	0	3	**7**	1920–1930
8	(United Kingdom) Fred Perry	1	1	3	3	1933–1936
8	(Australia) Ken Rosewall	4	2	0	2	1953–1972
8	(United States) Jimmy Connors	1	0	2	5	1974–1983
8	(Czechoslovakia) Ivan Lendl	2	3	0	3	1984–1990
8	(United States) Andre Agassi	4	1	1	2	1992–2003
Top 10

=== Women ===
Titles	Player	AO	FO	WIM	USO	Years
24	(Australia) Margaret Court	**11**	5	3	5	1960–1973
23	(United States) **Serena Williams**	7	3	7	6	1999–2017
22	(Germany) Steffi Graf	4	6	7	5	1987–1999
19	(United States) Helen Wills Moody	0	4	8	7	1923–1938
18	(United States) Chris Evert	2	**7**	3	6	1974–1986
18	(United States) Martina Navratilova	3	2	**9**	4	1978–1990
12	(United States) Billie Jean King	1	1	6	4	1966–1975
9	(United States) Maureen Connolly	1	2	3	3	1951–1954
9	(Socialist Federal Republic of Yugoslavia) / (Serbia and Montenegro) / (United States) Monica Seles	4	3	0	2	1990–1996
8	(Norway) / (United States) Molla Bjurstedt Mallory	0	0	0	**8**	1915–1922
8	(France) Suzanne Lenglen	0	2	6	0	1919–1926
Top 10

== Most singles titles and finals (Open Era) ==
AO Australian Open	WIM Wimbledon
FO French Open	USO US Open

Note:Active players and tournament records indicated in bold.

=== Most titles ===
Men
Titles	Player	AO	FO	WIM	USO	Years
**24**	**Novak Djokovic**	**10**	3	7	4	2008–2023
22	Rafael Nadal	2	**14**	2	4	2005–2022
20	Roger Federer	6	1	**8**	**5**	2003–2018
14	Pete Sampras	2	0	7	**5**	1990–2002
11	Björn Borg	0	6	5	0	1974–1981
8	Jimmy Connors	1	0	2	**5**	1974–1983
8	Ivan Lendl	2	3	0	3	1984–1990
8	Andre Agassi	4	1	1	2	1992–2003
7	John McEnroe	0	0	3	4	1979–1984
7	Mats Wilander	3	3	0	1	1982–1988
7	**Carlos Alcaraz**	1	2	2	2	2022–2026
Top 10

Women
Titles	Player	AO	FO	WIM	USO	Years
**23**	Serena Williams	**7**	3	7	**6**	1999–2017
22	Steffi Graf	4	6	7	5	1987–1999
18	Chris Evert	2	**7**	3	**6**	1974–1986
18	Martina Navratilova	3	2	**9**	4	1978–1990
11	Margaret Court	4	3	1	3	1969–1973 (Note: 1968 Australian Open not counted because it was the last major held before the Open Era.)
9	// Monica Seles	4	3	0	2	1990–1996
8	Billie Jean King	0	1	4	3	1968–1975
7	E. Goolagong Cawley	4	1	2	0	1971–1980
7	Justine Henin	1	4	0	2	2003–2007
7	**Venus Williams**	0	0	5	2	2000–2008
Top 10

=== Most finals ===
Men
Finals	Player	AO	FO	WIM	USO	Years
**38**	**Novak Djokovic**	**11**	7	10	**10**	2007–2026
**31**	Roger Federer	7	5	**12**	7	2003–2019
**30**	Rafael Nadal	6	**14**	5	5	2005–2022
**19**	Ivan Lendl	4	5	2	8	1981–1991
**18**	Pete Sampras	3	0	7	8	1990–2002
**16**	Björn Borg	0	6	6	4	1974–1981
**15**	Jimmy Connors	2	0	6	7	1974–1984
**15**	Andre Agassi	4	3	2	6	1990–2005
**11**	John McEnroe	0	1	5	5	1979–1985
**11**	Mats Wilander	4	5	0	2	1982–1988
**11**	Stefan Edberg	5	1	3	2	1985–1993
**11**	Andy Murray	5	1	3	2	2008–2016
Top 10

Women
Finals	Player	AO	FO	WIM	USO	**Years**
**34**	Chris Evert	6	**9**	10	9	1973–1988
**33**	Serena Williams	**8**	4	11	**10**	1999–2019
**32**	/ Martina Navratilova	6	6	**12**	8	1975–1994
**31**	Steffi Graf	5	**9**	9	8	1987–1999
**18**	E. Goolagong Cawley	7	2	5	4	1971–1980
**16**	**Venus Williams**	2	1	9	4	1997–2017
**13**	// Monica Seles	4	4	1	4	1990–1998
**12**	Margaret Court	4	3	2	3	1969–1973
**12**	Billie Jean King	1	1	6	4	1968–1975
**12**	Justine Henin	3	4	2	3	2001–2010
**12**	Martina Hingis	6	2	1	3	1997–2002
**12**	A. Sánchez Vicario	2	6	2	2	1989–1998
Top 10

== Records across all disciplines (all time) ==
S Singles	D Doubles	X Mixed

Note:Active players and tournament records indicated in bold.

=== Most titles ===
Men
Titles	Player	S	D	X	Years
28	Roy Emerson	12	16	0	1959–1971
26	John Newcombe	7	17	2	1964–1976
24	**Novak Djokovic**	**24**	0	0	2008–2023
23	Bob Bryan	0	16	7	2003–2014
22	Frank Sedgman	5	9	8	1948–1952
22	Todd Woodbridge	0	16	6	1990–2004
22	Mike Bryan	0	**18**	4	2003–2018
22	Rafael Nadal	22	0	0	2005–2022
21	Bill Tilden	10	6	5	1913–1930
20	Rod Laver	11	6	3	1959–1971
20	Roger Federer	20	0	0	2003–2018
Top 10

Women
Titles	Player	S	D	X	Years
64	Margaret Court	**24**	19	**21**	1960–1975
59	/ Martina Navratilova	18	**31**	10	1974–2006
39	Billie Jean King	12	16	11	1961–1980
39	Serena Williams	23	14	2	1998–2017
37	Margaret Osborne duPont	6	21	10	1941–1962
35	Doris Hart	6	14	15	1947–1955
35	Louise Brough	6	21	8	1942–1957
31	Helen Wills	19	9	3	1923–1938
26	Elizabeth Ryan	0	17	9	1914–1934
25	Martina Hingis	5	13	7	1996–2017
Top 10

=== Most wins per event ===
Event	Discipline	Men's titles		Women's titles	
Australian Championships/ Australian Open	Singles	10	**Novak Djokovic**	11	Margaret Court
Australian Championships/ Australian Open	Doubles	10	Adrian Quist	12	Thelma Coyne Long
Australian Championships/ Australian Open	Mixed doubles	4	Harry Hopman; Colin Long	4	Thelma Coyne Long: Nancye Wynne Bolton; Daphne Akhurst Cozens; Nell Hall Hopman; Margaret Court (Note: Margaret Court's (1965 and 1969) and Owen Davidson's (1965) Australian mixed doubles titles were unplayed finals.)
Australian Championships/ Australian Open	Total	13	Adrian Quist	23	Margaret Court
French Championships/ French Open	Singles	14	Rafael Nadal	7	Chris Evert
French Championships/ French Open	Doubles	6	Roy Emerson	7	/ Martina Navratilova
French Championships/ French Open	Mixed doubles	3	Ken Fletcher; Jean-Claude Barclay	4	Margaret Court
French Championships/ French Open	Total	14	Rafael Nadal	13	Margaret Court
Wimbledon Championships	Singles	8	Roger Federer	9	Martina Navratilova
Wimbledon Championships	Doubles	9	Todd Woodbridge	12	Elizabeth Ryan
Wimbledon Championships	Mixed doubles	4	Vic Seixas; Ken Fletcher; Owen Davidson; Leander Paes	7	Elizabeth Ryan
Wimbledon Championships	Total	13	Laurence Doherty	20	Billie Jean King; Martina Navratilova
US Championships/ US Open	Singles	7	Richard Sears; Bill Larned; Bill Tilden	8	/ Molla Mallory
US Championships/ US Open	Doubles	6	Richard Sears; Holcombe Ward; Mike Bryan	13	Margaret Osborne duPont
US Championships/ US Open	Mixed doubles	4	Edwin Fischer; Wallace Johnson; Bill Tilden: William Talbert; Marty Riessen; Owen Davidson; Bob Bryan	9	Margaret Osborne duPont
US Championships/ US Open	Total	16	Bill Tilden	25	Margaret Osborne duPont
Overall	Singles	24	**Novak Djokovic**	24	Margaret Court
Overall	Doubles	18	Mike Bryan	31	Martina Navratilova
Overall	Mixed doubles	11	Owen Davidson^{1}	21	Margaret Court^{1}
Overall	Total	28	Roy Emerson	64	Margaret Court^{1}

=== Most titles in a year ===
In 1965, Margaret Court won a record nine titles out of twelve available to a player in the same year: the singles, doubles and mixed doubles at all four Grand Slam tournaments. In 1985, Martina Navratilova reached the final in all Grand Slam events held that year, equaling the record of eleven final appearances set by Court in 1963 and repeated a year later.

Twelve unique players (nine women and three men) have won at least six major championships in one calendar year.

Key
**W**	F	SF	QF	#R	RR	Q#	DNQ	A	NH	S	D	X

(W) winner; (F) finalist; (SF) semifinalist; (QF) quarterfinalist; (#R) rounds 4, 3, 2, 1; (RR) round-robin stage; (Q#) qualification round; (DNQ) did not qualify; (A) absent; (NH) not held; (SR) strike rate (events won / competed); (W–L) win–loss record; (S) singles; (D) doubles; (X) mixed.

Titles	Player	Year	Australian Open			French Open			Wimbledon			US Open		
Titles	Player	Year	S	D	X	S	D	X	S	D	X	S	D	X
9	Margaret Court	1965	**W**	**W**	**W** (Note: Unplayed finals, shared titles.)	F	**W**	**W**	**W**	3R	**W**	**W**	A	**W**
8	Don Budge	1938	**W**	SF	QF	**W**	F	A	**W**	**W**	**W**	**W**	**W**	**W**
8	Frank Sedgman	1951	SF	**W**	A	SF	**W**	**W**	QF	**W**	**W**	**W**	**W**	**W**
8	Frank Sedgman	1952	F	**W**	A	F	**W**	**W**	**W**	**W**	**W**	**W**	F	**W**
8	Margaret Court	1963	**W**	**W**	**W**	QF	F	**W**	**W**	F	**W**	F	**W**	**W**
8	Margaret Court	1969	**W**	**W**	**W**	**W**	F	**W**	SF	**W**	SF	**W**	F	**W**
7	Doris Hart	1951	A	A	A	F	**W**	**W**	**W**	**W**	**W**	SF	**W**	**W**
7	Doris Hart	1952	A	A	A	**W**	**W**	**W**	QF	**W**	**W**	F	**W**	**W**
7	Margaret Court	1964	**W**	F	**W**	**W**	**W**	**W**	F	**W**	F	4R	F	**W**
7	Billie Jean King	1967	A	A	A	QF	QF	**W**	**W**	**W**	**W**	**W**	**W**	**W**
7	Margaret Court	1970	**W**	**W**	NH	**W**	SF	SF	**W**	SF	2R	**W**	**W**	**W**
7	Martina Navratilova	1984	SF	**W**	NH	**W**	**W**	A	**W**	**W**	QF	**W**	**W**	A
7	Martina Navratilova	1985	**W**	**W**	NH	F	**W**	**W**	**W**	F	**W**	F	F	**W**
6	Suzanne Lenglen	1925	A	A	A	**W**	**W**	**W**	**W**	**W**	**W**	A	A	A
6	Alice Marble	1939	A	A	A	A	A	A	**W**	**W**	**W**	**W**	**W**	**W**
6	Louise Brough	1950	**W**	**W**	SF	SF	F	A	**W**	**W**	**W**	3R	**W**	3R
6	Doris Hart	1953	A	A	A	F	**W**	**W**	F	**W**	**W**	F	**W**	**W**
6	Lew Hoad	1956	**W**	**W**	A	**W**	F	2R	**W**	**W**	A	F	**W**	F
6	Maria Bueno	1960	QF	**W**	SF	SF	**W**	**W**	**W**	**W**	F	F	**W**	F
6	Darlene Hard	1960	A	A	A	**W**	**W**	SF	QF	**W**	**W**	**W**	**W**	QF
6	Margaret Court	1973	**W**	**W**	NH	**W**	**W**	A	SF	QF	A	**W**	**W**	F
6	Martina Navratilova	1983	**W**	**W**	NH	4R	A	A	**W**	**W**	A	**W**	**W**	A
6	Martina Navratilova	1987	F	**W**	SF	F	**W**	QF	**W**	QF	A	**W**	**W**	**W**

=== Triple Crown ===
The Triple Crown refers to winning the singles, doubles, and mixed doubles titles at one event, in the same week. This has become an increasingly rare accomplishment in the sport, partly because the final matches in all three disciplines often likely take place concurrently in the same day, and not in separate days. Doris Hart for example attained her first Triple Crown after playing three Wimbledon final matches held on a single day.

Notes:

- This list excludes the 1909 Triple Crown of Jeanne Matthey at the French Championships and the 1920, 1921, 1922 and 1923 Triple Crown wins of Suzanne Lenglen at the French Championships. The French Championship tennis tournament at the time was a domestic competition not recognized as an international major. At the time, the major clay court event (actual precursor of the French Open in its current international format) was the World Hard Court Championships, where Suzanne Lenglen also attained a Triple Crown in 1921 and 1922.
- Also the 1941 triple championship of Alice Weiwers isn't listed due to its disputed official status: French major championships held in Vichy France from 1941 to 1945 aren't currently recognized by the Fédération Française de Tennis.

AO Australian Open	WIM Wimbledon
FO French Open	USO US Open

==== Men ====
Total	Player	Event
3	Don Budge	WIM (1937, 1938), USO (1938)
2	Bill Tilden	USO (1922, 1923)
2	Frank Sedgman	USO (1951), WIM (1952)
2	Neale Fraser	USO (1959, 1960)
1	Jack Hawkes	AO (1926)
1	Jean Borotra	AO (1928)
1	Jack Crawford	AO (1932)
1	Bobby Riggs	WIM (1939)
1	Vic Seixas	USO (1954)
1	Ken Rosewall	USO (1956)

==== Women ====
Total	Player	Event
5	Suzanne Lenglen	WIM (1920, 1922, 1925), FO (1925, 1926)
5	Margaret Court	AO (1963, 1965, 1969), FO (1964), USO (1970)
4	Alice Marble	USO (1938, 1939, 1940), WIM (1939)
3	Hazel Hotchkiss Wightman	USO (1909, 1910, 1911)
3	Mary Browne	USO (1912, 1913, 1914)
3	Daphne Akhurst Cozens	AO (1925, 1928, 1929)
3	Nancye Wynne Bolton	AO (1940, 1947, 1948)
3	Louise Brough Clapp	USO (1947), WIM (1948, 1950)
3	Doris Hart	WIM (1951), FO (1952), USO (1954)
3	Billie Jean King	WIM (1967, 1973), USO (1967)
2	Mabel Cahill	USO (1891, 1892)
2	Helen Wills Moody	USO (1924, 1928)
1	Juliette Atkinson	USO (1895)
1	Molla Bjurstedt Mallory	USO (1917)
1	Helen Jacobs	USO (1934)
1	Simonne Mathieu	FO (1938)
1	Sarah Palfrey Cooke	USO (1941)
1	Margaret Osborne duPont	USO (1950)
1	Thelma Coyne Long	AO (1952)
1	Maureen Connolly	FO (1954)
1	Martina Navratilova	USO (1987)

== Miscellaneous records ==
=== Youngest and oldest singles champions ===
==== Men ====
Age of first title		Event
17y 3 m	Michael Chang	1989 French Open
17y 7 m	Boris Becker	1985 Wimbledon
17y 9 m	Mats Wilander	1982 French Open
18y 0 m	Björn Borg	1974 French Open
18y 2 m	Ken Rosewall	1953 Australian Champ.

Age of last title		Event
41y 6 m	Arthur Gore	1909 Wimbledon
38y 8 m	William Larned	1911 US Champ.
37y 4 m	Bill Tilden	1930 Wimbledon
37y 2 m	Ken Rosewall	1972 Australian Open
36y 7 m	Norman Brookes	1914 Wimbledon

==== Women ====
Age of first title		Event
15y 9 m	Lottie Dod	1887 Wimbledon
16y 3 m	Martina Hingis	1997 Australian Open
16y 6 m	Monica Seles	1990 French Open
16y 9 m	Tracy Austin	1979 US Open
16y 9 m	May Sutton	1904 US Champ.

Age of last title		Event
42y 5 m	Molla Mallory	1926 US Champ.
38y 0 m	Maud Barger-Wallach	1908 US Champ.
37y 8 m	Charlotte Cooper	1908 Wimbledon
35y 10 m	D. Lambert Chambers	1914 Wimbledon
35y 4 m	Serena Williams	2017 Australian Open

=== Youngest and oldest singles competitors ===
==== Men ====
Age of first appearance		Event
14y 8 m	Wylie Grant	1894 U. S. Champs.
15y 2 m	Tommy Ho	1988 U. S. Open
15y 5 m	Alex Olmedo	1951 U. S. Champs.
15y 5 m	Vincent Richards	1918 U. S. Champs.
15y 5 m	Oliver Campbell	1886 U. S. Champs.

Age of last appearance		Event
59y 3 m	George Greville	1927 Wimbledon
57y 2 m	John Flavelle	1920 Wimbledon
55y 8 m	Major Ritchie	1926 Wimbledon
54y 5 m	Arthur Gore	1922 Wimbledon
53y 10 m	Brame Hillyard	1930 Wimbledon

=== Won a title without losing a set ===
AO Australian Open	WIM Wimbledon
FO French Open	USO US Open

The tables below don't include Wimbledon and U.S. Challenge Round eras.

==== Men's singles ====
No.	Player	Events
**4**	**Rafael Nadal**	FO (2008, 2010, 2017, 2020)
3	Björn Borg	FO (1978, 1980), WIM (1976)
3	Richard Sears	USO (1881, 1882, 1883)
3	Tony Trabert	WIM (1955), USO (1953, 1955)
2	Don Budge	AO (1938), WIM (1938)
2	Roger Federer	AO (2007), WIM (2017)
1	John Bromwich	AO (1939)
1	Roy Emerson	AO (1964)
1	Neale Fraser	USO (1960)
1	Rodney Heath	AO (1910)
1	Chuck McKinley	WIM (1963)
1	Ilie Năstase	FO (1973)
1	Pat O'Hara Wood	AO (1923)
1	Frank Parker	USO (1945)
1	Ken Rosewall	AO (1971)
1	Frank Sedgman	USO (1952)
1	Anthony Wilding	AO (1909) (Note: Fewest games (11) lost, winning a tournament.)

==== Women's singles ====
No.	Player	Events
**13**	Helen Wills Moody	FO (1928, 1929, 1930, 1932), WIM (1928, 1929, 1930, 1932, 1938), USO (1927, 1928, 1929, 1931)
9	Margaret Court	AO (1961, 1962, 1963, 1966, 1970, 1973), WIM (1965), USO (1965, 1969)
6	Martina Navratilova	WIM (1983, 1984, 1986, 1990), USO (1983, 1987)
6	Serena Williams	AO (2017), WIM (2002, 2010), USO (2002, 2008, 2014)
5	Maureen Connolly	AO (1953), FO (1954), WIM (1953, 1954), USO (1953)
5	Chris Evert	FO (1974), WIM (1981), USO (1976, 1977, 1978)
5	Steffi Graf	AO (1988, 1989, 1994), FO (1988), USO (1996)
5	Billie Jean King	FO (1972), WIM (1967), USO (1967, 1971, 1972)
5	Suzanne Lenglen	FO (1925, 1926), WIM (1922, 1923, 1925)
4	Evonne Goolagong	AO (1975, 1976, 1977 ^{(Dec)}), FO (1971)
4	Nancye Wynne Bolton	AO (1946, 1947, 1948, 1951)
3	Lindsay Davenport	AO (2000), WIM (1999), USO (1998)
3	Doris Hart	FO (1952), WIM (1951), USO (1955)
3	Justine Henin	FO (2006, 2007), USO (2007)
3	Hilde Sperling	FO (1935, 1936, 1937)
2	Daphne Akhurst	AO (1926, 1928)
2	Althea Gibson	WIM (1957), USO (1957)
2	Joan Hartigan	AO (1934, 1936)
2	Martina Hingis	AO (1997), USO (1997)
2	Alice Marble	WIM (1939), USO (1940)
2	Margaret Osborne duPont	FO (1949), WIM (1947)
2	**Venus Williams**	WIM (2008), USO (2001)
1	Marion Bartoli	WIM (2013)
1	Ashleigh Barty	AO (2022)
1	Pauline Betz	WIM (1946)
1	Louise Brough	WIM (1955)
1	Maria Bueno	USO (1964)
1	Dorothy Bundy	AO (1938)
1	Coral Buttsworth	AO (1932)
1	Mary Carter Reitano	AO (1959)
1	Shirley Fry	AO (1957)
1	Emily Hood Westacott	AO (1939)
1	Helen Jacobs	USO (1935)
1	Anita Lizana	USO (1937)
1	Thelma Long	AO (1954)
1	Molla Mallory	USO (1922)
1	Simone Mathieu	FO (1938)
1	Mall Molesworth	AO (1922)
1	Angela Mortimer	AO (1958)
1	Chris O'Neil	AO (1978)
1	Mary Pierce	AO (1995)
1	**Emma Raducanu**	USO (2021) (Note: Raducanu also won three qualifying matches without losing a set.)
1	Nancy Richey	AO (1967)
1	Arantxa Sánchez Vicario	FO (1994)
1	Monica Seles	USO (1992)
1	Maria Sharapova	AO (2008)
1	Karen Susman	WIM (1962)
1	**Iga Świątek**	FO (2020)
1	**Aryna Sabalenka**	AO (2024)

==== Men's doubles (Open Era) ====
No.	Player	Events
**3**	Mike Bryan; Bob Bryan	FO (2003), USO (2008, 2009)
1	Bob Lutz; Stan Smith	AO (1970)
1	Peter Fleming; John McEnroe	USO (1983)
1	Ken Flach; Rick Leach	USO (1993)
1	Yevgeny Kafelnikov; Daniel Vacek	FO (1996)
1	Wayne Black; Kevin Ullyett	AO (2005)
1	Jonathan Erlich; Andy Ram	AO (2008)
1	Max Mirnyi; Daniel Nestor	FO (2012)
1	Marcel Granollers; Horacio Zeballos	FO (2026)

==== Women's doubles (Open Era) ====
No.	Player	Events
**7**	Martina Navratilova	AO (1984, 1987, 1988), FO (1988), WIM (1986), USO (1978, 1984)
6	Margaret Court	AO (1969, 1970, 1971, 1973), FO (1973), WIM (1968)
6	Pam Shriver	AO (1984, 1987, 1988), FO (1988), WIM (1986), USO (1984)
5	Judy Tegart-Dalton	AO (1969, 1970, 1971), WIM (1968), USO (1971)
4	Martina Hingis	FO (1998), USO (1998, 2015, 2017)
3	Helen Cawley	AO (1972, 1976, 1977^{(dec)} (Note: Helen Cawley and Evonne Goolagong Cawley shared the title with Mona Guerrant and Kerry Melville Reid because of a rained out final; both teams reached the final without dropping a set.))
3	Evonne Goolagong Cawley	AO (1974, 1976, 1977^{(dec)})
3	/ Natasha Zvereva	FO (1989, 1992), USO (1992)
3	Jana Novotná	FO (1998), USO (1994, 1998)
3	Virginia Ruano Pascual; Paola Suárez	AO (2004), FO (2002), USO (2004)
2	Rosemary Casals	WIM (1970), USO (1971)
2	Billie Jean King	WIM (1970), USO (1978)
2	Virginia Wade	AO (1973), FO (1973)
2	Gigi Fernández	FO (1992), USO (1992)
2	Lindsay Davenport	FO (1996), WIM (1999)
2	Cara Black; Liezel Huber	WIM (2005), USO (2008)
2	Serena Williams; **Venus Williams**	WIM (2008, 2009)
1	Gail Chanfreau; Françoise Dürr	FO (1971)
1	Kerry Harris	AO (1972)
1	Anne Guerrant; Kerry Melville	AO (1977^{(dec)})
1	Larisa Savchenko	FO (1989)
1	Arantxa Sánchez Vicario	USO (1994)
1	Mary Joe Fernández	FO (1996)
1	Corina Morariu	WIM (1999)
1	Andrea Hlaváčková; Lucie Hradecká	FO (2011)
1	Ekaterina Makarova; Elena Vesnina	FO (2013)
1	Sania Mirza	USO (2015)
1	**Latisha Chan**	USO (2017)
1	Hsieh Su-wei; Barbora Strýcová	WIM (2019)
1	**Timea Babos**; **Kristina Mladenovic**	AO (2020)

==== Mixed doubles (Open Era) ====
No.	Player	Events
**4**	Leander Paes	AO (2003, 2015), WIM (2015), USO (2008)
3	Martina Hingis	AO (2015), WIM (2015, 2017)
2	Margaret Court; Marty Riessen	AO (1969), USO (1969)
2	Martina Navratilova	AO (2003), FO (1974)
2	Todd Woodbridge	AO (1993), USO (1990)
2	Cara Black	FO (2004), USO (2008)
2	Mahesh Bhupathi	FO (2012), WIM (2005)
1	Jean-Claude Barclay; Françoise Dürr	FO (1971)
1	Rosemary Casals; Ilie Năstase	WIM (1972)
1	Iván Molina	FO (1974)
1	Mary Carillo; John McEnroe	FO (1977)
1	Jorge Lazano; Lori McNeil	FO (1988)
1	Jana Novotná; Jim Pugh	AO (1989)
1	Elizabeth Smylie	USO (1990)
1	Arantxa Sánchez Vicario	AO (1993)
1	Justin Gimelstob; Venus Williams	FO (1998)
1	Ellis Ferreira; Corina Morariu	AO (2001)
1	Mike Bryan; Lisa Raymond	USO (2002)
1	Wayne Black	FO (2004)
1	Bob Bryan; **Vera Zvonareva**	USO (2004)
1	Mary Pierce	WIM (2005)
1	Iveta Benešová; Jurgen Melzer	WIM (2011)
1	Sania Mirza	FO (2012)
1	**Kristina Mladenovic**; Daniel Nestor	AO (2014)
1	**Mate Pavić**; **Laura Siegemund**	USO (2016)
1	Juan Sebastián Cabal; Abigail Spears	AO (2017)
1	**Jamie Murray**	WIM (2017)
1	**Latisha Chan**; **Ivan Dodig**	FO (2019)
1	(Italy) Sara Errani (Italy) Andrea Vavassori	FO (2025)

=== Won a title at first appearance ===
These players won the title the first time they played in that particular Grand Slam tournament (in the main draw).

==== Men ====
Player	Event
Andre Agassi	1995 Australian Open
Fred Alexander	1908 Australasian Championships
Jean Borotra	1928 Australian Championships
Norman Brookes	1911 Australasian Championships
Don Budge	1938 French Championships
Jimmy Connors	1974 Australian Open
Vitas Gerulaitis	1977 Australian Open (Dec.)
Spencer Gore	1877 Wimbledon
Colin Gregory	1929 Australian Championships
Frank Hadow	1878 Wimbledon
John Hartley	1879 Wimbledon
Rodney Heath	1905 Australasian Championships
Algernon Kingscote	1919 Australasian Championships
Johan Kriek	1981 Australian Open
René Lacoste	1925 French Championships
Gordon Lowe	1915 Australasian Championships
Don McNeill	1939 French Championships
Rafael Nadal	2005 French Open
Alex Olmedo	1959 Australian Championships
James Cecil Parke	1912 Australasian Championships
Frank Parker	1948 French Championships
Gerald Patterson	1919 Wimbledon
Bobby Riggs	1939 Wimbledon
Dick Savitt	1951 Australian Championships
Dick Savitt	1951 Wimbledon
Ted Schroeder	1949 Wimbledon
Richard Sears	1881 US Championships
Roscoe Tanner	1977 Australian Open (Jan.)
Bill Tilden	1920 Wimbledon
Ellsworth Vines	1932 Wimbledon
Mats Wilander	1982 French Open
Anthony Wilding	1906 Australasian Championships

==== Women ====
Player	Event
**Bianca Andreescu**	2019 US Open
Pauline Betz	1946 Wimbledon
Louise Brough	1950 Australian Championships
Mary Browne	1912 US Championships
Dorothy Bundy Cheney	1938 Australian Championships
Maureen Connolly	1952 Wimbledon
Maureen Connolly	1953 Australian Championships
Maureen Connolly	1953 French Championships
Lottie Dod	1887 Wimbledon
Shirley Fry	1957 Australian Championships
Althea Gibson	1956 French Championships
Evonne Goolagong Cawley	1971 French Open
Ellen Hansell	1887 US Championships
Doris Hart	1949 Australian Championships
Hazel Hotchkiss Wightman	1909 US Championships
Barbara Jordan	1979 Australian Open
Suzanne Lenglen	1919 Wimbledon
Suzanne Lenglen	1925 French Championships
Anita Lizana	1937 US Championships
Molla Bjurstedt Mallory	1915 US Championships
Mall Molesworth	1922 Australasian Championships
Angela Mortimer	1958 Australian Championships
Margaret Osborne duPont	1946 French Championships
**Emma Raducanu**	2021 US Open
Dorothy Round Little	1935 Australian Championships
Monica Seles	1991 Australian Open
May Sutton Bundy	1904 US Championships
May Sutton Bundy	1905 Wimbledon
Aline Terry	1893 US Championships
Bertha Townsend	1888 US Championships
Virginia Wade	1972 Australian Open
Maud Watson	1884 Wimbledon

=== Won a title at final appearance ===
These players won the title of the final Grand Slam tournament they played.

==== Men ====
Player	Event
Frank Hadow	1878 Wimbledon
Richard Sears	1887 U.S. National Championships
Laurence Doherty	1906 Wimbledon
William Larned	1911 U.S. National Championships
Fred Perry	1936 U.S. National Championships
Don Budge	1938 U.S. National Championships
Bobby Riggs	1941 U.S. National Championships
Jack Kramer	1947 U.S. National Championships
Tony Trabert	1955 U.S. National Championships
Ashley Cooper	1958 U.S. National Championships
Pete Sampras	2002 US Open

==== Women ====
Player	Event
Lena Rice	1890 Wimbledon Championships
Lottie Dod	1893 Wimbledon Championships
Muriel Robb	1902 Wimbledon Championships
Daphne Akhurst	1930 Australian National Championships
Helen Wills	1938 Wimbledon Championships
Alice Marble	1940 U.S. National Championships
Sarah Palfrey Cooke	1945 U.S. National Championships
Pauline Betz	1946 U.S. National Championships
Maureen Connolly	1954 Wimbledon Championships
Doris Hart	1955 U.S. National Championships
Shirley Fry	1957 Australian National Championships
Althea Gibson	1958 U.S. National Championships
Ann Haydon-Jones	1969 Wimbledon Championships
Marion Bartoli	2013 Wimbledon Championships
Flavia Pennetta	2015 US Open
Ashleigh Barty	2022 Australian Open

=== Won a title after saving match points ===
These players saved at least one match point during their listed title runs. The accompanying number of match points saved and final match score are also listed.

Key
**W**	F	SF	QF	#R	RR

(W) winner; (F) finalist; (SF) semifinalist; (QF) quarterfinalist; (#R) rounds 4, 3, 2, 1; (RR) round-robin stage.

==== Men ====
Event	Round	MPs	Winner	Opponent	Score
1927 Australian Championships	F	5	Gerald Patterson	John Hawkes	3–6, 6–4, 3–6, 18–16, 6–3
1927 French Championships	F	2	René Lacoste	Bill Tilden	6–4, 4–6, 5–7, 6–3, 11–9
1927 Wimbledon	F	**6**	Henri Cochet	Jean Borotra	4–6, 4–6, 6–3, 6–4, 7–5
1934 French Championships	F	1	Gottfried von Cramm	Jack Crawford	6–4, 7–9, 3–6, 7–5, 6–3
1936 U.S. Championships	F	2	Fred Perry	Don Budge	2–6, 6–2, 8–6, 1–6, 10–8
1947 Australian Championships	F	1	Dinny Pails	John Bromwich	4–6, 6–4, 3–6, 7–5, 8–6
1948 Wimbledon	F	3	Bob Falkenburg	John Bromwich (2)	7–5, 0–6, 6–2, 3–6, 7–5
1949 Wimbledon	QF	2	Ted Schroeder	Frank Sedgman	3–6, 8–6, 6–3, 2–6, 9–7
1960 Australian Championships	F	1	Rod Laver	Neale Fraser	5–7, 3–6, 6–3, 8–6, 8–6
1960 Wimbledon	QF	5	Neale Fraser	Butch Buchholz	4–6, 6–3, 4–6, 15–15 ret.
1962 French Championships	QF	1	Rod Laver (2)	Martin Mulligan	6–4, 3–6, 2–6, 10–8, 6–2
1975 Australian Open	SF	3	John Newcombe	Tony Roche	6–4, 4–6, 6–4, 2–6, 11–9
1975 US Open	SF	5	Manuel Orantes	Guillermo Vilas	4–6, 1–6, 6–2, 7–5, 6–4
1976 French Open	1R	1	Adriano Panatta	Pavel Hut'ka	2–6, 6–2, 6–2, 0–6, 12–10
1982 Australian Open	SF	1	Johan Kriek	Paul McNamee	7–6, 7–6, 4–6, 3–6, 7–5
1985 Australian Open	4R	2	Stefan Edberg	Wally Masur	6–7^{(4–7)}, 2–6, 7–6^{(7–4)}, 6–4, 6–2
1989 US Open	2R	2	Boris Becker	Derrick Rostagno	1–6, 6–7^{(1–7)}, 6–3, 7–6^{(8–6)}, 6–3
1996 US Open	QF	1	Pete Sampras	Àlex Corretja	7–6^{(7–5)}, 5–7, 5–7, 6–4, 7–6^{(9–7)}
2001 French Open	4R	1	Gustavo Kuerten	Michael Russell	3–6, 4–6, 7–6^{(7–3)}, 6–3, 6–1
2003 US Open	SF	1	Andy Roddick	David Nalbandian	6–7^{(4–7)}, 3–6, 7–6^{(9–7)}, 6–1, 6–3
2004 French Open	F	2	Gastón Gaudio	Guillermo Coria	0–6, 3–6, 6–4, 6–1, 8–6
2005 Australian Open	SF	1	Marat Safin	Roger Federer (1)	5–7, 6–4, 5–7, 7–6^{(8–6)}, 9–7
2011 US Open	SF	2	**Novak Djokovic**	Roger Federer (2)	6–7^{(7–9)}, 4–6, 6–3, 6–2, 7–5
2016 US Open	3R	1	**Stan Wawrinka**	**Daniel Evans**	4–6, 6–3, 6–7^{(6–8)}, 7–6^{(10–8)}, 6–2
2019 Wimbledon	F	2	**Novak Djokovic** (2)	Roger Federer (3)	7–6^{(7–5)}, 1–6, 7–6^{(7–4)}, 4–6, 13–12^{(7–3)}
2022 US Open	QF	1	**Carlos Alcaraz**	**Jannik Sinner**	6–3, 6–7^{(7–9)}, 6–7^{(0–7)}, 7–5, 6–3
2025 French Open	F	3	**Carlos Alcaraz** (2)	**Jannik Sinner** (2)	4–6, 6–7^{(4–7)}, 6–4, 7–6^{(7–3)}, 7–6^{(10–2)}

==== Women ====
Event	Round	MPs	Winner	Opponent	Score
1923 Australasian Championships	SF	1	Margaret Molesworth	Sylvia Lance	3–6, 6–4, 8–6
1935 Wimbledon Championships	F	1	Helen Wills	Helen Jacobs	6–3, 3–6, 7–5
1946 French Championships	F	2	M. Osborne duPont	Pauline Betz	1–6, 8–6, 7–5
1956 Australasian Championships	F	1	Mary Carter Reitano	Thelma Coyne Long	3–6, 6–2, 9–7
1962 French Championships	F	1	Margaret Court	Lesley Turner	6–3, 3–6, 7–5
1986 US Open	SF	3	Martina Navratilova	Steffi Graf	6–1, 6–7^{(3–7)}, 7–6^{(10–8)}
1991 Australian Open	SF	1	Monica Seles	Mary Joe Fernández	6–3, 0–6, 9–7
2002 Australian Open	F	**4**	Jennifer Capriati	Martina Hingis	4–6, 7–6^{(9–7)}, 6–2
2003 Australian Open	SF	2	Serena Williams	Kim Clijsters	4–6, 6–3, 7–5
2004 French Open	4R	1	Anastasia Myskina	Svetlana Kuznetsova (1)	1–6, 6–4, 8–6
2005 Australian Open	SF	3	Serena Williams (2)	Maria Sharapova	2–6, 7–5, 8–6
2005 French Open	4R	2	Justine Henin	Svetlana Kuznetsova (2)	7–6^{(8–6)}, 4–6, 7–5
2005 Wimbledon	F	1	**Venus Williams**	Lindsay Davenport	4–6, 7–6^{(7–4)}, 9–7
2009 Wimbledon	SF	1	Serena Williams (3)	Elena Dementieva	6–7^{(4–7)}, 7–5, 8–6
2014 Australian Open	3R	1	Li Na	Lucie Šafářová	1–6, 7–6^{(7–2)}, 6–3
2016 Australian Open	1R	1	Angelique Kerber	Misaki Doi	6–7^{(4–7)}, 7–6^{(8–6)}, 6–3
2018 Australian Open	2R	2	**Caroline Wozniacki**	**Jana Fett**	3–6, 6–2, 7–5
2021 Australian Open	4R	2	**Naomi Osaka**	Garbiñe Muguruza	4–6, 6–4, 7–5
2021 French Open	SF	1	**Barbora Krejčíková**	**Maria Sakkari**	7–5, 4–6, 9–7
2024 French Open	2R	1	**Iga Świątek**	**Naomi Osaka**	7–6^{(7–1)}, 1–6, 7–5
2025 Australian Open	SF	1	**Madison Keys**	**Iga Świątek**	5–7, 6–1, 7–6^{(10–8)}
2026 Wimbledon	3R	1	**Linda Nosková**	**Sorana Cîrstea**	2–6, 6–3, 7–6^{(11–9)}

=== Fewest career first-round losses ===
Must have won at least 2 singles titles and played at least 20 first round matches (does not include second round matches after a bye in the first round, walkovers, or challenge rounds).

Losses	Men	Women
**None**	Fred Perry; Björn Borg; **Carlos Alcaraz**	Suzanne Lenglen; Helen Wills; Helen Jacobs; Maureen Connolly; Darlene Hard; Margaret Court; Evonne Goolagong Cawley; Chris Evert
**1**	Bill Tilden; Ken Rosewall	/ Molla Bjurstedt Mallory; Alice Marble; Margaret Osborne duPont; Pauline Betz; Doris Hart; Althea Gibson; Hana Mandlíková; Tracy Austin / Monica Seles; **Iga Świątek**
**2**	Roy Emerson	Louise Brough; Maria Bueno; Lesley Turner Bowrey
**3**	Arthur Ashe; Yevgeny Kafelnikov; Rafael Nadal; **Novak Djokovic**	Billie Jean King; Steffi Graf; Lindsay Davenport; Martina Hingis; Kim Clijsters

=== Participation ===
==== Men ====
#	Appearances
84	(Serbia) **Novak Djokovic**
81	(Switzerland) Roger Federer
81	(Spain) Feliciano López
78	(Switzerland) **Stan Wawrinka**
75	(France) Richard Gasquet
71	Fernando Verdasco
71	(France) **Gaël Monfils**
70	(France) Fabrice Santoro
69	(Russia) Mikhail Youzhny
68	(Germany) Philipp Kohlschreiber
68	(Spain) Rafael Nadal

#	Consecutive appearances
79	Feliciano López
67	Fernando Verdasco
66	Andreas Seppi
65	Roger Federer
58	Grigor Dimitrov
56	Wayne Ferreira
54	Stefan Edberg
52	Tomáš Berdych
51	Novak Djokovic
50	David Ferrer
50	Guillermo García López
50	Stan Wawrinka

==== Women ====
#	Appearances
95	**Venus Williams**
82	Serena Williams
72	Alizé Cornet
71	Amy Frazier
71	Svetlana Kuznetsova
70	Francesca Schiavone
69	Sam Stosur
69	**Victoria Azarenka**
67	/ Martina Navratilova
67	**Anastasia Pavlyuchenkova**

#	Consecutive appearances
69	Alizé Cornet
62	Ai Sugiyama
61	Francesca Schiavone
56	Jelena Janković
54	Nathalie Dechy
54	Elena Likhovtseva
52	Patty Schnyder
51	Angelique Kerber
49	Caroline Garcia
48	Ana Ivanovic
48	Anastasia Pavlyuchenkova

== Most doubles titles (all time) ==
AO Australian Open	WIM Wimbledon
FO French Open	USO US Open

Note:Active players and tournament records indicated in bold.

=== Per team ===
==== Men ====
Titles	Player	AO	FO	WIM	USO	Years
16	(United States) Bob Bryan (United States) Mike Bryan	6	2	3	**5**	2003–2014
12	(Australia) John Newcombe (Australia) Tony Roche	4	2	5	1	1965–1976
11	(Australia) Todd Woodbridge (Australia) Mark Woodforde	2	1	6	2	1992–2000
10	(United Kingdom) Laurence Doherty (United Kingdom) Reginald Doherty	0	0	**8**	2	1897–1905
10	(Australia) John Bromwich (Australia) Adrian Quist	**8**	0	1	1	1936–1950
7	(Australia) Ken McGregor (Australia) Frank Sedgman	2	2	2	1	1951–1952
7	(Australia) Roy Emerson (Australia) Neale Fraser	1	2	2	2	1959–1962
7	(United States) Peter Fleming (United States) John McEnroe	0	0	4	3	1979–1984
6	(Australia) Lew Hoad (Australia) Ken Rosewall	2	1	2	1	1953–1956
5	(United States) Richard Sears (United States) James Dwight	0	0	0	**5**	1882–1887
5	(United Kingdom) Ernest Renshaw (United Kingdom) William Renshaw	0	0	5	0	1884–1889
5	(France) Jacques Brugnon (France) Henri Cochet	0	**3**	2	0	1926–1932
5	(France) Jean Borotra (France) Jacques Brugnon	1	2	2	0	1928–1934
5	(Australia) John Newcombe (Australia) Tony Roche	2	1	1	1	1965–1967
5	(South Africa) Bob Hewitt (South Africa) Frew McMillan	0	1	3	1	1967–1978
5	(United States) Robert Lutz (United States) Stan Smith	1	0	0	4	1968–1980
5	(Netherlands) Jacco Eltingh (Netherlands) Paul Haarhuis	1	2	1	1	1994–1998
5	(Sweden) Jonas Björkman (Australia) Todd Woodbridge	1	0	3	1	2001–2004
5	(France) Pierre-Hugues Herbert (France) Nicolas Mahut	1	2	1	1	2015–2021
Top 10

==== Women ====
Titles	Player	AO	FO	WIM	USO	Years
20	(United States) Margaret Osborne duPont (United States) Louise Brough	0	3	5	**12**	1942–1957
20	(United States) Martina Navratilova (United States) Pam Shriver	7	4	5	4	1981–1989
14	(Commonwealth of Independent States) / (Belarus) Natasha Zvereva (United States) Gigi Fernández	2	**5**	4	3	1992–1997
14	(United States) **Serena Williams** (United States) **Venus Williams**	4	2	**6**	2	1999–2016
11	(United States) Doris Hart (United States) Shirley Fry Irvin	0	4	3	4	1950–1954
10	(Australia) Thelma Coyne Long (Australia) Nancye Wynne Bolton	**10**	0	0	0	1936–1952
8	(Spain) Virginia Ruano Pascual (Argentina) Paola Suárez	1	4	0	3	2001–2005
7	(United States) Rosemary Casals (United States) Billie Jean King	0	0	5	2	1967–1974
7	(Czech Republic) **Barbora Krejčíková** (Czech Republic) **Kateřina Siniaková**	2	2	2	1	2018–2023
6	(France) Suzanne Lenglen (United States) Elizabeth Ryan	0	0	**6**	0	1919–1925
6	(United States) Sarah Palfrey Cooke (United States) Alice Marble	0	0	2	4	1937–1940
Top 10

=== Per player ===
==== Men ====
Titles	Player	AO	FO	WIM	USO	Years
18	(United States) Mike Bryan	6	2	4	**6**	2003–2018
17	(Australia) John Newcombe	5	3	6	3	1965–1976
16	(Australia) Roy Emerson	3	**6**	3	4	1959–1971
16	(Australia) Todd Woodbridge	3	1	**9**	3	1992–2004
16	(United States) Bob Bryan	6	2	3	5	2003–2014
14	(Australia) Adrian Quist	**10**	1	2	1	1935–1950
13	(Australia) John Bromwich	8	0	2	3	1938–1950
13	(Australia) Tony Roche	5	2	5	1	1965–1977
12	(Australia) Mark Woodforde	2	1	6	3	1989–2000
11	(Australia) Neale Fraser	3	3	2	3	1957–1962
Top 10

==== Women ====
Titles	Player	AO	FO	WIM	USO	Years
31	(Czechoslovakia) / (United States) Martina Navratilova	8	**7**	7	9	1975–1990
21	(United States) Margaret Osborne duPont	0	3	5	**13**	1941–1957
21	(United States) Louise Brough Clapp	1	3	5	12	1942–1957
21	(United States) Pam Shriver	7	4	5	5	1981–1991
19	(Australia) Margaret Court	8	4	2	5	1961–1975
18	(Soviet Union) / (Commonwealth of Independent States) / (Belarus) Natasha Zvereva	3	6	5	4	1989–1997
17	(United States) Elizabeth Ryan	0	4	**12**	1	1914–1934
17	(United States) Gigi Fernández	2	6	4	5	1988–1997
16	(United States) Billie Jean King	0	1	10	5	1961–1980
14	(United States) Doris Hart	1	5	4	4	1947–1954
14	(United States) **Serena Williams**	4	2	6	2	1999–2016
14	(United States) **Venus Williams**	4	2	6	2	1999–2016
Top 10

== Most mixed doubles titles (all time) ==
AO Australian Open	WIM Wimbledon
FO French Open	USO US Open

Note:Active players and tournament records indicated in bold.

=== Per team ===
Titles	Player	AO	FO	WIM	USO	Years
10	(Australia) Margaret Court (Australia) Ken Fletcher	2	**3**	**4**	1	1963–1968
8	(United States) Doris Hart (Australia) Frank Sedgman	2	2	2	2	1949–1952
8	(United States) Billie Jean King (Australia) Owen Davidson	0	1	**4**	3	1967–1974
7	(United States) Doris Hart (United States) Vic Seixas	0	1	3	3	1953–1955
6	(Australia) Margaret Court (United States) Marty Riessen	1 (Note: The 1969 Australian Open final was not played – title shared with Ann Haydon-Jones and Fred Stolle.)	1	1	3	1969–1975
4	(Australia) Nell Hall Hopman (Australia) Harry Hopman	**4**	0	0	0	1930–1939
4	(Australia) Nancye Wynne Bolton (Australia) Colin Long	**4**	0	0	0	1940–1948
4	(United States) Margaret Osborne duPont (United States) William Talbert	0	0	0	**4**	1943–1946
4	(United States) Margaret Osborne duPont (Australia) Neale Fraser	0	0	1	3	1958–1962
4	(Netherlands) Betty Stöve (South Africa) Frew McMillan	0	0	2	2	1977–1981
4	(Czech Republic) Jana Novotná (United States) Jim Pugh	2	0	1	1	1988–1989
4	(India) Leander Paes (Switzerland) Martina Hingis	1	1	1	1	2015–2016
4	**(Italy) Sara Errani** **(Italy) Andrea Vavassori**	0	2	0	2	2024–2026
Top 10

=== Per player ===
==== Men ====
Total	Player	AO	FO	WIM	USO
**11**	Owen Davidson	2	1	**4**	**4**
10	Ken Fletcher	2	**3**	**4**	1
10	Leander Paes	3	1	**4**	2
8	Vic Seixas	0	1	**4**	3
8	Frank Sedgman	2	2	2	2
8	Mahesh Bhupathi	2	2	2	2
7	Fred Stolle	2	0	3	2
7	Marty Riessen	1	1	1	**4**
7	Bob Bryan	0	2	1	**4**
6	Todd Woodbridge	1	1	1	3
Top 10

==== Women ====
Total	Player	AO	FO	WIM	USO
**21**	Margaret Court	**4**	**4**	5	8
15	Doris Hart	2	3	5	5
11	Billie Jean King	1	2	4	4
10	Margaret Osborne duPont	0	0	1	**9**
10	/ Martina Navratilova	1	2	4	3
9	Elizabeth Ryan	0	0	**7**	2
8	Louise Brough	0	0	4	4
7	Alice Marble	0	0	3	4
7	Martina Hingis	2	1	2	2
6	Hazel Hotchkiss Wightman	0	0	0	6
Top 10

== Grand Slam, Year-End Championship and Olympics ==
AO Australian Open	WIM Wimbledon	OLY Olympics
FO French Open	USO US Open	YEC Year-end Championships

=== Grand Slam ===
A player who wins all four majors in the same year is said to have achieved a "Grand Slam".

No.	Year	Player	Discipline	Major				Notes	Ref.
1	1938	Don Budge	Men's singles	AO	FO	WIM	USO	(Note: Part of 6 consecutive titles.)	
2	1951	Ken McGregor	Men's doubles	AO	FO	WIM	USO	(Note: Part of 7 consecutive titles.)	
2	1951	Frank Sedgman	Men's doubles	AO	FO	WIM	USO	(Note: Part of 8 consecutive titles with John Bromwich in 1950 U.S. Championships.)	
4	1953	Maureen Connolly	Women's singles	AO	FO	WIM	USO		
5	1960	Maria Bueno	Women's doubles	AO	FO	WIM	USO	(Note: Partnered with Christine Truman and Darlene Hard.)	
6	1962	Rod Laver	Men's singles	AO	FO	WIM	USO		
7	1963	Margaret Court	Mixed doubles	AO	FO	WIM	USO	(Note: Part of 7 consecutive titles with Fred Stolle in 1962 U.S. Championships.)	
7	1963	Ken Fletcher	Mixed doubles	AO	FO	WIM	USO		
9	1965	Margaret Court (2)	Mixed doubles	AO	FO	WIM	USO	(Note: Part of 5 consecutive titles with John Newcombe, Ken Fletcher and Fred Stolle.)	
10	1967	Owen Davidson	Mixed doubles	AO	FO	WIM	USO	(Note: Part of 5 consecutive titles with Donna Floyd, Lesley Turner Bowrey and Billie Jean King.)	
11	1969	Rod Laver (2)	Men's singles	AO	FO	WIM	USO		
12	1970	Margaret Court (3)	Women's singles	AO	FO	WIM	USO		
13	1983	Stefan Edberg	Boys' singles	FO	WIM	USO	AO		
14	1984	Martina Navratilova	Women's doubles	FO	WIM	USO	AO	(Note: Part of 8 consecutive titles.)	
14	1984	Pam Shriver	Women's doubles	FO	WIM	USO	AO	(Note: Part of 8 consecutive titles.)	
16	1988	Steffi Graf	Women's singles	AO	FO	WIM	USO	(Note: Part of 5 consecutive titles.)	
17	1998	Martina Hingis	Women's doubles	AO	FO	WIM	USO	(Note: Part of 5 consecutive titles with Mirjana Lučić, Jana Novotná and Anna Kournikova.)	

==== Non-calendar-year Grand Slam ====
A player who wins all four majors consecutively across two calendar years is said to have achieved a "Non-calendar-year Grand Slam".

No.	Player	Discipline	Major				Notes
1	Louise Brough	Women's doubles	1949 FO	1949 WIM	1949 USO	1950 AO	(Note: Partnered with Margaret Osborne duPont and Doris Hart.)
2	Billie Jean King	Mixed doubles	1967 FO	1967 WIM	1967 USO	1968 AO	(Note: Partnered with Owen Davidson and Dick Crealy.)
3	Martina Navratilova	Women's singles	1983 WIM	1983 USO	1983 AO	1984 FO	
4	Martina Navratilova (2)	Women's doubles	1986 WIM	1986 USO	1987 AO	1987 FO	(Note: Part of 5 consecutive titles with Andrea Temesvári in 1986 French Open.)
4	Pam Shriver	Women's doubles	1986 WIM	1986 USO	1987 AO	1987 FO	
6	Gigi Fernández	Women's doubles	1992 FO	1992 WIM	1992 USO	1993 AO	
6	Natasha Zvereva	Women's doubles	1992 FO	1992 WIM	1992 USO	1993 AO	
8	Steffi Graf	Women's singles	1993 FO	1993 WIM	1993 USO	1994 AO	
9	Natasha Zvereva (2)	Women's doubles	1996 USO	1997 AO	1997 FO	1997 WIM	
10	Serena Williams	Women's singles	2002 FO	2002 WIM	2002 USO	2003 AO	
11	Serena Williams (2)	Women's doubles	2009 WIM	2009 USO	2010 AO	2010 FO	
11	Venus Williams	Women's doubles	2009 WIM	2009 USO	2010 AO	2010 FO	
13	Bob Bryan	Men's doubles	2012 USO	2013 AO	2013 FO	2013 WIM	
13	Mike Bryan	Men's doubles	2012 USO	2013 AO	2013 FO	2013 WIM	
15	Serena Williams (3)	Women's singles	2014 USO	2015 AO	2015 FO	2015 WIM	
16	Novak Djokovic	Men's singles	2015 WIM	2015 USO	2016 AO	2016 FO	
17	Jana Kovačková	Girls' doubles	2025 USO	2026 AO	2026 FO	2026 WIM	

==== Career Grand Slam ====
A player who wins all four majors during his or her career is said to have achieved a "Career Grand Slam".

No.	Player	Discipline	AO	FO	WIM	USO
1	Jean Borotra	Mixed doubles	**1928**	1927	1925	1926
2	Fred Perry	Men's singles	1934	**1935**	1934	1933
3	Don Budge	Men's singles	1938	**1938**	1937	1937
4	Adrian Quist	Men's doubles	1936	1935	1935	**1939**
5	Louise Brough	Women's doubles	**1950**	1946	1946	1942
6	Frank Sedgman	Men's doubles	1951	**1951**	1948	1950
7	Doris Hart	Mixed doubles	1949	1951	1951	**1951**
7	Frank Sedgman (2)	Mixed doubles	1949	1951	1951	**1951**
9	Doris Hart (2)	Women's doubles	1949	1951	1951	**1951**
10	Ken McGregor	Men's doubles	1951	1951	1951	**1951**
11	Frank Sedgman (3)	Men's doubles	1952	**1952**	1951	1951
12	Doris Hart (3)	Mixed doubles	1950	1952	1952	**1952**
12	Frank Sedgman (4)	Mixed doubles	1950	1952	1952	**1952**
14	Maureen Connolly	Women's singles	1953	**1953**	1952	1951
15	Doris Hart (4)	Women's singles	1949	1950	1951	**1954**
16	Lew Hoad	Men's doubles	1953	1953	1953	**1956**
16	Ken Rosewall	Men's doubles	1953	1953	1953	**1956**
18	Shirley Fry Irvin	Women's doubles	**1957**	1950	1951	1951
19	Shirley Fry Irvin (2)	Women's singles	**1957**	1951	1956	1956
20	Neale Fraser	Men's doubles	1957	1958	**1959**	1957
21	Maria Bueno	Women's doubles	1960	1960	1958	**1960**
22	Neale Fraser (2)	Men's doubles	1958	1960	**1961**	1960
23	Roy Emerson	Men's doubles	**1962**	1960	1959	1959
24	Rod Laver	Men's singles	1960	1962	1961	**1962**
25	Margaret Court	Mixed doubles	1963	1963	**1963**	1961
26	Margaret Court (2)	Women's singles	1960	1962	**1963**	1962
27	Ken Fletcher	Mixed doubles	1963	1963	1963	**1963**
28	Margaret Court (3)	Women's doubles	1961	1964	**1964**	1963
29	Lesley Turner Bowrey	Women's doubles	1964	1964	**1964**	1961
30	Roy Emerson (2)	Men's singles	1961	1963	**1964**	1961
31	Margaret Court (4)	Mixed doubles	1964	1964	**1965**	1962
32	Fred Stolle	Men's doubles	1963	1965	1962	**1965**
33	Margaret Court (5)	Women's singles	1961	1964	1965	**1965**
34	Roy Emerson (3)	Men's doubles	**1966**	1961	1961	1960
35	Margaret Court (6)	Mixed doubles	1965	1965	**1966**	1963
36	Roy Emerson (4)	Men's singles	1963	**1967**	1965	1964
37	Owen Davidson	Mixed doubles	1965	1967	**1967**	1966
38	John Newcombe	Men's doubles	1965	1967	1965	**1967**
38	Tony Roche	Men's doubles	1965	1967	1965	**1967**
40	Billie Jean King	Mixed doubles	**1968**	1967	1967	1967
41	Fred Stolle (2)	Men's doubles	1964	**1968**	1964	1966
42	Margaret Court (7)	Mixed doubles	1969	**1969**	1968	1964
43	Margaret Court (8)	Women's doubles	1962	1965	**1969**	1968
44	Ken Rosewall (2)	Men's doubles	1956	1968	1956	**1969**
45	Rod Laver (2)	Men's singles	1962	1969	1962	**1969**
46	Margaret Court (9)	Women's singles	1962	1969	**1970**	1969
47	Judy Tegart-Dalton	Women's doubles	1964	1966	1969	**1970**
48	Roy Emerson (5)	Men's doubles	1969	1962	**1971**	1965
49	John Newcombe (2)	Men's doubles	1967	1969	1966	**1971**
50	Billie Jean King (2)	Women's singles	1968	**1972**	1966	1967
51	John Newcombe (3)	Men's doubles	1971	1973	1968	**1973**
52	Marty Riessen	Mixed doubles	1969	1969	**1975**	1969
53	Bob Hewitt	Men's doubles	1963	1972	1962	**1977**
54	Bob Hewitt (2)	Mixed doubles	1961	1970	1977	**1979**
55	Martina Navratilova	Women's doubles	**1980**	1975	1976	1977
56	Kathy Jordan	Women's doubles	**1981**	1980	1980	1981
56	Anne Smith	Women's doubles	**1981**	1980	1980	1981
58	Martina Navratilova (2)	Women's doubles	1982	**1982**	1979	1978
59	Chris Evert	Women's singles	**1982**	1974	1974	1975
60	Martina Navratilova (3)	Women's singles	1981	1982	1978	**1983**
61	Stefan Edberg	Boys' singles	**1983**	1983	1983	1983
62	Martina Navratilova (4)	Women's doubles	1983	**1984**	1981	1980
63	Pam Shriver	Women's doubles	1982	**1984**	1981	1983
64	Martina Navratilova (5)	Women's singles	1983	1984	1979	**1984**
65	Mark Kratzmann	Boys' doubles	**1984**	1983	1983	1983
66	Chris Evert (2)	Women's singles	**1984**	1975	1976	1976
67	Martina Navratilova (6)	Women's doubles	1984	**1985**	1982	1983
68	Pam Shriver (2)	Women's doubles	1983	**1985**	1982	1984
69	Martina Navratilova (7)	Women's doubles	1985	**1986**	1983	1984
70	Martina Navratilova (8)	Women's doubles	1987	**1987**	1984	1986
71	Pam Shriver (3)	Women's doubles	1984	**1987**	1983	1986
72	Martina Navratilova (9)	Women's doubles	1988	**1988**	1986	1987
73	Pam Shriver (4)	Women's doubles	1985	**1988**	1984	1987
74	Steffi Graf	Women's singles	1988	1987	1988	**1988**
75	John Fitzgerald	Men's doubles	1982	1986	**1989**	1984
76	Anders Järryd	Men's doubles	1987	1983	**1989**	1987
77	Steffi Graf (2)	Women's singles	1989	1988	1989	**1989**
78	Helena Suková	Women's doubles	1990	**1990**	1987	1985
79	Gigi Fernández	Women's doubles	**1993**	1991	1992	1988
80	Natasha Zvereva	Women's doubles	**1993**	1989	1991	1991
81	Steffi Graf (3)	Women's singles	1990	1993	1991	**1993**
82	Gigi Fernández (2)	Women's doubles	**1994**	1992	1993	1990
83	Natasha Zvereva (2)	Women's doubles	**1994**	1992	1992	1992
84	Todd Woodbridge	Mixed doubles	1993	1992	**1994**	1990
85	Jana Novotná	Women's doubles	1990	1990	1989	**1994**
86	Mark Woodforde	Mixed doubles	1992	**1995**	1993	1992
87	Steffi Graf (4)	Women's singles	1994	1995	1992	**1995**
88	Natasha Zvereva (3)	Women's doubles	**1997**	1993	1993	1995
89	Jana Novotná (2)	Women's doubles	1995	1991	1990	**1997**
90	Jacco Eltingh	Men's doubles	1994	1995	**1998**	1994
90	Paul Haarhuis	Men's doubles	1994	1995	**1998**	1994
92	Martina Hingis	Women's doubles	1997	1998	1996	**1998**
93	Andre Agassi	Men's singles	1995	**1999**	1992	1994
94	Todd Woodbridge (2)	Men's doubles	1992	**2000**	1993	1995
94	Mark Woodforde (2)	Men's doubles	1992	**2000**	1993	1995
96	Serena Williams	Women's doubles	**2001**	1999	2000	1999
96	Venus Williams	Women's doubles	**2001**	1999	2000	1999
98	Martina Navratilova (10)	Mixed doubles	**2003**	1974	1985	1985
99	Serena Williams (2)	Women's singles	**2003**	2002	2002	1999
100	Jonas Björkman	Men's doubles	1998	**2005**	2002	2003
101	Daniela Hantuchová	Mixed doubles	2002	2005	2001	**2005**
102	Mahesh Bhupathi	Mixed doubles	**2006**	1997	2002	1999
103	Lisa Raymond	Women's doubles	2000	**2006**	2001	2001
104	Bob Bryan	Men's doubles	2006	2003	**2006**	2005
104	Mike Bryan	Men's doubles	2006	2003	**2006**	2005
106	Daniel Nestor	Men's doubles	2002	2007	**2008**	2004
107	Roger Federer	Men's singles	2004	**2009**	2003	2004
108	Cara Black	Mixed doubles	**2010**	2002	2004	2008
109	Serena Williams (3)	Women's doubles	2003	**2010**	2002	2009
109	Venus Williams (2)	Women's doubles	2003	**2010**	2002	2009
111	Rafael Nadal	Men's singles	2009	2005	2008	**2010**
113	Leander Paes	Men's doubles	**2012**	1999	1999	2006
114	Mahesh Bhupathi (2)	Mixed doubles	2009	**2012**	2005	2005
115	Maria Sharapova	Women's singles	2008	**2012**	2004	2006
116	Serena Williams (4)	Women's singles	2005	**2013**	2003	2002
117	Bob Bryan (2)	Men's doubles	2007	**2013**	2011	2008
117	Mike Bryan (2)	Men's doubles	2007	**2013**	2011	2008
119	Sara Errani	Women's doubles	2013	2012	**2014**	2012
119	Roberta Vinci	Women's doubles	2013	2012	**2014**	2012
121	Serena Williams (5)	Women's singles	2007	**2015**	2009	2008
122	Martina Hingis (2)	Women's doubles	1998	2000	1998	**2015**
123	Martina Hingis (3)	Mixed doubles	2006	**2016**	2015	2015
124	Leander Paes (2)	Mixed doubles	2003	**2016**	1999	2008
125	Novak Djokovic	Men's singles	2008	**2016**	2011	2011
126	Pierre-Hugues Herbert	Men's doubles	**2019**	2018	2016	2015
126	Nicolas Mahut	Men's doubles	**2019**	2018	2016	2015
128	Novak Djokovic (2)	Men's singles	2011	**2021**	2014	2015
129	Rafael Nadal (2)	Men's singles	**2022**	2006	2010	2013
130	Barbora Krejčíková	Women's doubles	2022	2018	2018	**2022**
130	Kateřina Siniaková	Women's doubles	2022	2018	2018	**2022**
132	Novak Djokovic (3)	Men's singles	2012	**2023**	2015	2018
133	Mate Pavić	Men's doubles	2018	**2024**	2021	2020
134	Carlos Alcaraz	Men's singles	**2026**	2024	2023	2022
135	Jana Kovačková	Girls' doubles	2026	2026	**2026**	2025
136	Kateřina Siniaková (2)	Women's doubles	2023	2021	2022	**2026**
137	Taylor Townsend	Women's doubles	2025	2026	2024	**2026**

=== Golden Slam ===
A player who wins all four majors and the Olympic gold medal (or a Paralympic gold medal) in a single season is said to have achieved a "Golden Slam".

Year	Player	Discipline	Tournaments					Notes
1988	Steffi Graf	Women's singles	AO	FO	WIM	USO	OLY	(Note: Part of 5 consecutive major titles.)

==== Non-calendar-year Golden Slam ====
A player who wins all four majors and the Olympic gold medal (or a Paralympic gold medal) consecutively across two calendar years is said to have achieved a "Non-calendar-year Golden Slam".

Player	Discipline	Tournaments				
Bob Bryan	Men's doubles	2012 USO	2012 OLY	2013 AO	2013 FO	2013 WIM
Mike Bryan	Men's doubles	2012 USO	2012 OLY	2013 AO	2013 FO	2013 WIM

==== Career Golden Slam ====
A player who wins all four majors and the Olympic gold medal (or a Paralympic gold medal) during his or her career is said to have achieved a "Career Golden Slam".

- The event at which the Career Golden Slam was achieved is indicated in **bold**.

No.	Player	Discipline	AO	FO	WIM	USO	OLY
1	Pam Shriver	Women's doubles	1982	1984	1981	1983	**1988**
2	Steffi Graf	Women's singles	1988	1987	1988	1988	**1988**
3	Gigi Fernández	Women's doubles	**1993**	1991	1992	1988	1992
4	Gigi Fernández (2)	Women's doubles	1994	1992	1993	1990	**1996**
5	Andre Agassi	Men's singles	1995	**1999**	1992	1994	1996
6	Todd Woodbridge	Men's doubles	1992	**2000**	1993	1992	1996
6	Mark Woodforde	Men's doubles	1992	**2000**	1993	1992	1996
8	Serena Williams	Women's doubles	**2001**	1999	2000	1999	2000
8	Venus Williams	Women's doubles	**2001**	1999	2000	1999	2000
10	Daniel Nestor	Men's doubles	2002	2007	**2008**	2004	2000
11	Serena Williams (2)	Women's doubles	2003	**2010**	2002	2009	2008
11	Venus Williams (2)	Women's doubles	2003	**2010**	2002	2009	2008
13	Rafael Nadal	Men's singles	2009	2005	2008	**2010**	2008
14	Bob Bryan	Men's doubles	2006	2003	2006	2005	**2012**
14	Mike Bryan	Men's doubles	2006	2003	2006	2005	**2012**
16	Serena Williams (3)	Women's singles	2003	2002	2002	1999	**2012**
17	Barbora Krejčíková	Women's doubles	2022	2018	2018	**2022**	2021
17	Kateřina Siniaková	Women's doubles	2022	2018	2018	**2022**	2021
19	Mate Pavić	Men's doubles	2018	**2024**	2021	2020	2021
20	Novak Djokovic	Men's singles	2008	2016	2011	2011	**2024**
21	Sara Errani	Women's doubles	2013	2012	2014	2012	**2024**

=== Super Slam ===
A player who wins all four majors, the Olympic gold medal (or a Paralympic gold medal) and the year-end championships (currently, the ATP Finals for the men's tour, WTA Finals for the women's tour, and the Wheelchair Tennis Masters for the wheelchair tennis tour) in a single season is said to have achieved a "Super Slam".

==== Non-calendar-year Super Slam ====
A player who wins all four majors, the Olympic gold medal (or a Paralympic gold medal) and the year-end championships (currently, the ATP Finals for the men's tour, WTA Finals for the women's tour, and the Wheelchair Tennis Masters for the wheelchair tennis tour) consecutively across two calendar years is said to have achieved a "Non-calendar-year Super Slam".

Year	Player	Discipline	Tournaments					
1988	Steffi Graf	Women's singles	1987 YEC	1988 AO	1988 FO	1988 WIM	1988 USO	1988 OLY

==== Career Super Slam ====
A player who wins all four majors, the Olympic gold medal and the year-end championship throughout his or her career is said to have achieved a "Career Super Slam".

- The event at which the Career Super Slam was achieved is indicated in **bold**.

No.	Player	Discipline	AO	FO	WIM	USO	OLY	YEC
1	Pam Shriver	Women's doubles	1982	1984	1981	1983	**1988**	1981
2	Steffi Graf	Women's singles	1988	1987	1988	1988	**1988**	1987
3	Gigi Fernández	Women's doubles	1993	1991	1992	1988	1992	**1993**
4	Gigi Fernández (2)	Women's doubles	1994	1992	1993	1990	**1996**	1994
5	Andre Agassi	Men's singles	1995	**1999**	1992	1994	1996	1990
6	Todd Woodbridge	Men's doubles	1992	**2000**	1993	1992	1996	1992
6	Mark Woodforde	Men's doubles	1992	**2000**	1993	1992	1996	1992
8	Daniel Nestor	Men's doubles	2002	2007	**2008**	2004	2000	2007
9	Bob Bryan	Men's doubles	2006	2003	2006	2005	**2012**	2003
9	Mike Bryan	Men's doubles	2006	2003	2006	2005	**2012**	2003
11	Serena Williams	Women's singles	2003	2002	2002	1999	**2012**	2001
12	Barbora Krejčíková	Women's doubles	2022	2018	2018	**2022**	2021	2021
12	Kateřina Siniaková	Women's doubles	2022	2018	2018	**2022**	2021	2021
14	Novak Djokovic	Men's singles	2008	2016	2011	2011	**2024**	2008

== Wheelchair records ==
AO Australian Open	WIM Wimbledon
FO French Open	USO US Open

=== Wheelchair men's singles ===
Rank	Player	Grand Slam					Masters	Paralympics	Total
Rank	Player	Australian Open	French Open	Wimbledon	US Open	Total	Masters	Paralympics	Total
1	Shingo Kunieda	**11**	**8**	1	**8**	**28**	3	**3**	**34**
2	Tokito Oda	2	4	**3**	1	10	3	1	14
3	Alfie Hewett	2	3	1	5	11	3	0	14
4	Robin Ammerlaan	1	0	0	2	3	**6**	1	10
5	David Hall	3	0	0	0	3	2	1	6
5	Joachim Gérard	1	0	1	0	2	4	0	6
7	Stéphane Houdet	0	2	0	2	4	1	0	5
7	Gustavo Fernández	2	2	1	0	5	0	0	5
9	Stefan Olsson	0	0	2	0	2	2	0	4
10	Ricky Molier	0	0	0	0	0	2	1	3
10	Maikel Scheffers	1	1	0	0	2	1	0	3
10	Gordon Reid	1	0	1	0	2	0	1	3
13	Randy Snow	0	0	0	0	0	1	1	2
14	Stephen Welch	0	0	0	0	0	1	0	1
14	Laurent Giammartini	0	0	0	0	0	1	0	1
14	Kai Schrameyer	0	0	0	0	0	1	0	1
14	Michaël Jérémiasz	1	0	0	0	1	0	0	1

=== Wheelchair men's doubles ===
Rank	Player	Grand Slam					Masters	Paralympics	Total
Rank	Player	Australian Open	French Open	Wimbledon	US Open	Total	Masters	Paralympics	Total
1	Gordon Reid	7	**9**	**7**	**7**	**30**	5	1	**36**
2	Stéphane Houdet	5	7	3	5	20	**7**	**3**	30
2	Alfie Hewett	6	7	**7**	6	26	3	1	30
4	Shingo Kunieda	**8**	8	4	2	22	1	1	24
5	Michaël Jérémiasz	1	2	3	3	9	4	1	14
6	Nicolas Peifer	2	3	1	2	8	3	2	13
7	Robin Ammerlaan	6	0	3	2	11	0	1	12
8	Maikel Scheffers	1	1	1	2	5	3	0	8
8	Ronald Vink	1	0	3	1	5	3	0	8
10	Martin Legner	3	0	0	0	3	3	0	6
10	Satoshi Saida	1	0	1	1	3	2	1	6
10	Stefan Olsson	1	0	2	1	4	1	1	6
10	Joachim Gérard	2	1	1	0	4	2	0	6
10	Gustavo Fernández	1	1	2	1	5	1	0	6
15	Martín de la Puente	0	0	1	1	2	2	0	4
16	Stephen Welch	0	0	0	0	0	2	1	3
17	Ricky Molier	0	0	0	0	0	1	1	2
17	Jayant Mistry	0	0	1	0	1	1	0	2
17	Tom Egberink	0	0	1	0	1	1	0	2
17	Peter Vikström	0	0	0	0	0	1	1	2
17	Tokito Oda	1	0	0	1	2	0	0	2
22	Brad Parks	0	0	0	0	0	0	1	1
22	Randy Snow	0	0	0	0	0	0	1	1
22	Vance Parmelly	0	0	0	0	0	0	1	1
22	Miroslav Brychta	0	0	0	0	0	1	0	1
22	Kai Schrameyer	0	0	0	0	0	1	0	1
22	Frédéric Cattanéo	0	1	0	0	1	0	0	1
22	Takashi Sanada	0	0	0	1	1	0	0	1
22	Ruben Spaargaren	0	0	1	0	1	0	0	1

=== Wheelchair women's singles ===
Rank	Player	Grand Slam tournaments					Masters	Paralympics	Total
Rank	Player	Australian Open	French Open	Wimbledon	US Open	Total	Masters	Paralympics	Total
1	Esther Vergeer	**9**	**6**	0	**6**	21	**14**	**4**	**39**
2	Diede de Groot	6	**6**	**6**	**6**	**24**	6	1	31
3	Yui Kamiji	3	5	1	4	13	3	1	17
4	Jiske Griffioen	2	1	1	0	4	3	1	8
5	Aniek van Koot	1	0	1	1	3	1	0	4
6	Monique Kalkman	0	0	0	0	0	2	1	3
7	Maaike Smit	0	0	0	0	0	1	1	2
7	Sabine Ellerbrock	1	1	0	0	2	0	0	2
9	Chantal Vandierendonck	0	0	0	0	0	1	0	1
9	Mie Yaosa	1	0	0	0	1	0	0	1
9	Korie Homan	1	0	0	0	1	0	0	1
9	Jordanne Whiley	0	0	0	1	1	0	0	1
9	Marjolein Buis	0	1	0	0	1	0	0	1
9	Wang Ziying	0	0	1	0	1	0	0	1
9	Li Xiaohui	1	0	0	0	1	0	0	1

=== Wheelchair women's doubles ===
Rank	Player	Grand Slam tournaments					Masters	Paralympics	Total
Rank	Player	Australian Open	French Open	Wimbledon	US Open	Total	Masters	Paralympics	Total
1	Esther Vergeer	**7**	5	3	**6**	21	**10**	**3**	**34**
1	Aniek van Koot	**7**	**9**	3	5	24	8	2	**34**
3	Yui Kamiji	5	6	**9**	5	**25**	4	1	30
4	Diede de Groot	5	6	3	5	19	5	1	25
4	Jiske Griffioen	6	3	3	4	16	8	1	25
6	Jordanne Whiley	3	2	5	2	12	2	0	14
7	Sharon Walraven	2	1	2	2	7	2	1	10
8	Maaike Smit	2	1	0	0	3	4	2	9
9	Marjolein Buis	2	2	0	1	5	2	1	8
10	Korie Homan	1	1	1	2	5	1	1	7
11	Kgothatso Montjane	0	2	1	1	4	1	0	5
12	Li Xiaohui	2	0	1	1	4	0	0	4
12	Wang Ziying	2	0	1	1	4	0	0	4
12	Zhu Zhenzhen	0	1	1	1	3	0	1	4
15	Monique Kalkman	0	0	0	0	0	0	2	2
15	Chantal Vandierendonck	0	0	0	0	0	0	2	2
15	Florence Gravellier	2	0	0	0	2	0	0	2
15	Daniela Di Toro	0	1	0	0	1	1	0	2
19	Lucy Shuker	0	0	0	0	0	1	0	1
19	Dana Mathewson	0	0	1	0	1	0	0	1
19	Manami Tanaka	0	0	0	0	0	0	1	1

=== Wheelchair quad singles ===
Rank	Player	Grand Slam					Masters	Paralympics	Total
Rank	Player	Australian Open	French Open	Wimbledon	US Open	Total	Masters	Paralympics	Total
1	Dylan Alcott	**7**	**3**	2	**3**	**15**	1	**2**	**18**
2	David Wagner	3	0	0	**3**	6	**11**	0	17
3	Niels Vink	1	**3**	**4**	**3**	11	3	1	15
4	Peter Norfolk	4	0	0	2	6	3	**2**	11
5	Sam Schröder	4	0	1	2	7	2	0	9
6	Noam Gershony	0	0	0	0	0	1	1	2
6	Andy Lapthorne	0	0	0	2	2	0	0	2
6	Guy Sasson	0	2	0	0	2	0	0	2
9	Lucas Sithole	0	0	0	1	1	0	0	1

=== Wheelchair quad doubles ===
Rank	Player	Grand Slam					Masters	Paralympics	Total
Rank	Player	Australian Open	French Open	Wimbledon	US Open	Total	Masters	Paralympics	Total
1	David Wagner	**10**	3	1	**9**	**23**	**11**	**3**	**37**
2	Nick Taylor	4	0	0	7	11	**11**	**3**	25
3	Niels Vink	2	**4**	**5**	4	15	6	2	23
4	Andy Lapthorne	8	2	2	4	16	2	0	18
4	Sam Schröder	2	3	3	4	12	4	2	18
6	Dylan Alcott	4	1	1	2	8	0	1	9
7	Guy Sasson	1	2	2	1	6	1	0	7
8	Heath Davidson	4	0	0	0	4	1	1	6
9	Peter Norfolk	2	0	0	0	2	3	0	5
10	Sarah Hunter	0	0	0	0	0	2	0	2
11	Johan Andersson	0	0	0	0	0	1	0	1
11	Bas van Erp	0	0	0	0	0	1	0	1
11	Lucas Sithole	1	0	0	0	1	0	0	1
11	Antony Cotterill	0	0	0	0	0	1	0	1
11	Donald Ramphadi	0	1	0	0	1	0	0	1
11	Jin Woodman	0	0	0	1	1	0	0	1

=== Grand Slam ===
No.	Year	Player	Discipline	Major				Notes	Ref.
1	2009	Esther Vergeer	Wheelchair women's doubles	AO	FO	WIM	USO	(Note: Part of 12 consecutive titles with Korie Homan, Jiske Griffioen and Maaike Smit between 2005 and 2008.)	
1	2009	Korie Homan	Wheelchair women's doubles	AO	FO	WIM	USO		
3	2011	Esther Vergeer (2)	Wheelchair women's doubles	AO	FO	WIM	USO	(Note: Part of 8 consecutive titles with Marjolein Buis in 2012 French Open.)	
3	2011	Sharon Walraven	Wheelchair women's doubles	AO	FO	WIM	USO		
5	2013	Aniek van Koot	Wheelchair women's doubles	AO	FO	WIM	USO		
5	2013	Jiske Griffioen	Wheelchair women's doubles	AO	FO	WIM	USO		
7	2014	Stéphane Houdet	Wheelchair men's doubles	AO	FO	WIM	USO	(Note: Partnered with Joachim Gérard and Shingo Kunieda.)	
8	2014	Yui Kamiji	Wheelchair women's doubles	AO	FO	WIM	USO		
8	2014	Jordanne Whiley	Wheelchair women's doubles	AO	FO	WIM	USO		
10	2019	Aniek van Koot (2)	Wheelchair women's doubles	AO	FO	WIM	USO		
10	2019	Diede de Groot	Wheelchair women's doubles	AO	FO	WIM	USO	(Note: Part of 7 consecutive titles with Aniek van Koot and Yui Kamiji in 2018.)	
12	2019	Dylan Alcott	Wheelchair quad doubles	AO	FO	WIM	USO	(Note: Part of 6 consecutive titles with Heath Davidson, David Wagner and Andy Lapthorne.)	
13	2021	Alfie Hewett	Wheelchair men's doubles	AO	FO	WIM	USO	(Note: Part of 10 consecutive titles.)	
13	2021	Gordon Reid	Wheelchair men's doubles	AO	FO	WIM	USO	(Note: Part of 10 consecutive titles.)	
15	2021	Diede de Groot (2)	Wheelchair women's singles	AO	FO	WIM	USO		
16	2021	Dylan Alcott (2)	Wheelchair quad singles	AO	FO	WIM	USO		
17	2022	Diede de Groot (3)	Wheelchair women's singles	AO	FO	WIM	USO	(Note: First consecutive Grand Slam achievement.)	
18	2023	Diede de Groot (4)	Wheelchair women's singles	AO	FO	WIM	USO	(Note: Third consecutive Grand Slam achievement in the same discipline.)	
19	2026	Niels Vink	Wheelchair quad singles	AO	FO	WIM	USO		

==== Non-calendar-year Grand Slam ====
No.	Player	Discipline	Major				Notes
1	Stéphane Houdet	Wheelchair men's doubles	2009 FO	2009 WIM	2009 USO	2010 AO	(Note: Partnered with Michaël Jérémiasz, Shingo Kunieda and Stefan Olsson.)
2	Shingo Kunieda	Wheelchair men's doubles	2014 WIM	2014 USO	2015 AO	2015 FO	(Note: Partnered with Stéphane Houdet and Gordon Reid.)
3	Diede de Groot	Wheelchair women's singles	2018 WIM	2018 USO	2019 AO	2019 FO	
4	Dylan Alcott	Wheelchair quad singles	2018 USO	2019 AO	2019 FO	2019 WIM	
5	Shingo Kunieda (2)	Wheelchair men's singles	2021 USO	2022 AO	2022 FO	2022 WIM	
6	Sam Schröder	Wheelchair quad doubles	2022 FO	2022 WIM	2022 USO	2023 AO	
6	Niels Vink	Wheelchair quad doubles	2022 FO	2022 WIM	2022 USO	2023 AO	
8	Guy Sasson	Wheelchair quad doubles	2025 FO	2025 WIM	2025 USO	2026 AO	
8	Niels Vink (2)	Wheelchair quad doubles	2025 FO	2025 WIM	2025 USO	2026 AO	
10	Tokito Oda	Wheelchair men's singles	2025 FO	2025 WIM	2025 USO	2026 AO	

==== Career Grand Slam ====
No.	Player	Discipline	AO	FO	WIM	USO
1	Shingo Kunieda	Wheelchair men's doubles	2007	**2008**	2006	2007
2	Korie Homan	Wheelchair women's doubles	2009	2009	**2009**	2005
3	Esther Vergeer	Wheelchair women's doubles	2004	2007	**2009**	2005
4	Stéphane Houdet	Wheelchair men's doubles	**2010**	2007	2009	2009
5	Esther Vergeer (2)	Wheelchair women's doubles	2006	2008	**2010**	2006
6	Sharon Walraven	Wheelchair women's doubles	2011	**2011**	2010	2010
7	Esther Vergeer (3)	Wheelchair women's doubles	2007	2009	**2011**	2007
8	Maikel Scheffers	Wheelchair men's doubles	2011	2008	**2011**	2010
9	Jiske Griffioen	Wheelchair women's doubles	2006	2008	**2012**	2006
10	Michaël Jérémiasz	Wheelchair men's doubles	**2013**	2009	2009	2005
11	Jiske Griffioen (2)	Wheelchair women's doubles	2007	2013	**2013**	2007
12	Aniek van Koot	Wheelchair women's doubles	2010	2010	2012	**2013**
13	Stéphane Houdet (2)	Wheelchair men's doubles	**2014**	2009	2013	2011
14	Yui Kamiji	Wheelchair women's doubles	2014	2014	2014	**2014**
14	Jordanne Whiley	Wheelchair women's doubles	2014	2014	2014	**2014**
16	Shingo Kunieda (2)	Wheelchair men's doubles	2008	2010	2013	**2014**
17	Stéphane Houdet (3)	Wheelchair men's doubles	**2015**	2010	2014	2014
18	Aniek van Koot (2)	Wheelchair women's doubles	2013	2013	2013	**2015**
19	Nicolas Peifer	Wheelchair men's doubles	**2016**	2011	2015	2011
20	Gordon Reid	Wheelchair men's doubles	**2017**	2015	2016	2015
21	Yui Kamiji (2)	Wheelchair women's doubles	2015	2016	2015	**2018**
22	Diede de Groot	Wheelchair women's doubles	**2019**	2018	2018	2017
23	Diede de Groot (2)	Wheelchair women's singles	2018	**2019**	2017	2018
24	Dylan Alcott	Wheelchair quad singles	2015	2019	**2019**	2015
25	Dylan Alcott (2)	Wheelchair quad doubles	2018	2019	2019	**2019**
26	Aniek van Koot (3)	Wheelchair women's doubles	2017	2015	2019	**2019**
27	Gordon Reid (2)	Wheelchair men's doubles	**2020**	2016	2017	2017
28	Alfie Hewett	Wheelchair men's doubles	2020	**2020**	2016	2017
29	Yui Kamiji (3)	Wheelchair women's doubles	2016	2017	2016	**2020**
30	Jordanne Whiley (2)	Wheelchair women's doubles	2015	2016	2015	**2020**
31	Diede de Groot (3)	Wheelchair women's doubles	**2021**	2019	2019	2018
32	Gordon Reid (3)	Wheelchair men's doubles	**2021**	2020	2018	2018
33	Diede de Groot (4)	Wheelchair women's singles	2019	**2021**	2018	2019
34	Andy Lapthorne	Wheelchair quad doubles	2011	**2021**	2019	2017
35	Alfie Hewett (2)	Wheelchair men's doubles	2021	**2021**	2017	2018
36	David Wagner	Wheelchair quad doubles	2008	2019	**2021**	2007
37	Dylan Alcott (3)	Wheelchair quad singles	2016	2020	**2021**	2018
38	Gordon Reid (4)	Wheelchair men's doubles	**2022**	2021	2021	2019
39	Diede de Groot (5)	Wheelchair women's singles	2021	**2022**	2021	2020
40	Alfie Hewett (3)	Wheelchair men's doubles	2022	**2022**	2018	2019
41	Shingo Kunieda (3)	Wheelchair men's singles	2007	2007	**2022**	2007
42	Sam Schröder	Wheelchair quad doubles	**2023**	2020	2022	2021
43	Niels Vink	Wheelchair quad doubles	**2023**	2022	2022	2021
44	Andy Lapthorne (2)	Wheelchair quad doubles	2012	**2023**	2021	2018
45	Diede de Groot (6)	Wheelchair women's singles	2022	**2023**	2022	2021
46	Alfie Hewett (4)	Wheelchair men's doubles	2023	**2023**	2021	2020
47	Gordon Reid (5)	Wheelchair men's doubles	2023	2022	**2023**	2020
48	Jiske Griffioen (3)	Wheelchair women's doubles	2008	2015	**2023**	2013
49	Diede de Groot (7)	Wheelchair women's doubles	2022	2020	**2023**	2019
50	Yui Kamiji (4)	Wheelchair women's doubles	2018	2023	2017	**2023**
51	Diede de Groot (8)	Wheelchair women's singles	2023	**2024**	2023	2022
52	Alfie Hewett (5)	Wheelchair men's doubles	2024	**2024**	2023	2021
53	Gordon Reid (6)	Wheelchair men's doubles	2024	2023	**2024**	2021
54	Alfie Hewett (6)	Wheelchair men's singles	2023	2017	**2024**	2018
55	Sam Schröder (2)	Wheelchair quad doubles	**2025**	2022	2023	2022
56	(Japan) Tokito Oda	Wheelchair men's singles	2024	2023	2023	**2025**
57	Niels Vink (2)	Wheelchair quad doubles	**2026**	2024	2023	2022
58	Guy Sasson	Wheelchair quad doubles	**2026**	2025	2025	2025
59	Gustavo Fernández	Wheelchair men's doubles	**2026**	2019	2015	2025
60	Niels Vink (3)	Wheelchair quad singles	**2026**	2022	2023	2022
61	Diede de Groot (9)	Wheelchair women's singles	2024	**2026**	2024	2023
62	Yui Kamiji (5)	Wheelchair women's singles	2017	2014	**2026**	2014
63	Yui Kamiji (6)	Wheelchair women's doubles	2020	2025	2018	**2026**
64	Alfie Hewett (7)	Wheelchair men's doubles	2025	2025	2024	**2026**
65	Gordon Reid (7)	Wheelchair men's doubles	2025	2024	2026	**2026**

=== Golden Slam ===
==== Calendar Golden Slam ====
No.	Year	Player	Discipline	Tournaments					Notes
1	2021	Diede de Groot	Wheelchair women's singles	AO	FO	WIM	OLY	USO	(Note: The 2020 Summer Paralympics were held in 2021 due to the COVID-19 pandemic.)
2	2021	Dylan Alcott	Wheelchair quad singles	AO	FO	WIM	OLY	USO	

==== Career Golden Slam ====
No.	Player	Discipline	AO	FO	WIM	USO	OLY
1	Shingo Kunieda	Wheelchair men's doubles	2007	**2008**	2006	2007	2004
2	Korie Homan	Wheelchair women's doubles	2009	2009	**2009**	2005	2008
3	Esther Vergeer	Wheelchair women's doubles	2004	2007	**2009**	2005	2000
4	Stéphane Houdet	Wheelchair men's doubles	**2010**	2007	2009	2009	2008
5	Esther Vergeer (2)	Wheelchair women's doubles	2006	2008	**2010**	2006	2004
6	Sharon Walraven	Wheelchair women's doubles	2011	**2011**	2010	2010	2008
7	Esther Vergeer (3)	Wheelchair women's doubles	2007	2009	2011	2007	**2012**
8	Michaël Jérémiasz	Wheelchair men's doubles	**2013**	2009	2009	2005	2008
9	Jiske Griffioen	Wheelchair women's doubles	2006	2008	2012	2006	**2016**
10	Aniek van Koot	Wheelchair women's doubles	2010	2010	2012	2013	**2016**
11	Stéphane Houdet (2)	Wheelchair men's doubles	2014	2009	2013	2011	**2016**
12	Nicolas Peifer	Wheelchair men's doubles	2016	2011	2015	2011	**2016**
13	Dylan Alcott	Wheelchair quad singles	2015	2019	**2019**	2015	2016
14	Dylan Alcott (2)	Wheelchair quad doubles	2018	2019	2019	**2019**	2016
15	David Wagner	Wheelchair quad doubles	2008	2019	**2021**	2007	2004
16	Diede de Groot	Wheelchair women's singles	2018	2019	2017	2018	**2021**
17	Dylan Alcott (3)	Wheelchair quad singles	2016	2020	2021	2018	**2021**
18	Diede de Groot (2)	Wheelchair women's doubles	2019	2018	2018	2017	**2021**
19	Aniek van Koot (2)	Wheelchair women's doubles	2013	2013	2013	2015	**2021**
20	Stéphane Houdet (3)	Wheelchair men's doubles	2015	2010	2014	2014	**2021**
21	Shingo Kunieda (2)	Wheelchair men's singles	2007	2007	**2022**	2007	2008
22	Sam Schröder	Wheelchair quad doubles	**2023**	2020	2022	2021	2021
23	Niels Vink	Wheelchair quad doubles	**2023**	2022	2022	2021	2021
24	Yui Kamiji	Wheelchair women's doubles	2014	2014	2014	2014	**2024**
25	Alfie Hewett	Wheelchair men's doubles	2020	2020	2016	2017	**2024**
26	Gordon Reid	Wheelchair men's doubles	2017	2015	2016	2015	**2024**
27	Sam Schröder (2)	Wheelchair quad doubles	**2025**	2022	2023	2022	2024
28	(Japan) Tokito Oda	Wheelchair men's singles	2024	2023	2023	**2025**	2024
29	Niels Vink (2)	Wheelchair quad doubles	**2026**	2024	2023	2022	2024
30	Niels Vink (3)	Wheelchair quad singles	**2026**	2022	2023	2022	2024
31	Yui Kamiji (5)	Wheelchair women's singles	2017	2014	**2026**	2014	2024

=== Super Slam ===
==== Calendar Super Slam ====
Year	Player	Discipline	Tournaments						Notes
2021	Diede de Groot	Wheelchair women's singles	AO	FO	WIM	OLY	USO	YEC	

==== Career Super Slam ====
No.	Player	Discipline	AO	FO	WIM	USO	OLY	YEC
1	Esther Vergeer	Wheelchair women's doubles	2004	2007	**2009**	2005	2000	2001
2	Korie Homan	Wheelchair women's doubles	2009	2009	**2009**	2005	2008	2004
3	Stéphane Houdet	Wheelchair men's doubles	**2010**	2007	2009	2009	2008	2006
4	Esther Vergeer (2)	Wheelchair women's doubles	2006	2008	**2010**	2006	2004	2001
5	Sharon Walraven	Wheelchair women's doubles	2011	**2011**	2010	2010	2008	2010
6	Esther Vergeer (3)	Wheelchair women's doubles	2007	2009	2011	2007	**2012**	2002
7	Shingo Kunieda	Wheelchair men's doubles	2007	2008	2006	2007	2004	**2012**
8	Michaël Jérémiasz	Wheelchair men's doubles	**2013**	2009	2009	2005	2008	2008
9	Jiske Griffioen	Wheelchair women's doubles	2006	2008	2012	2006	**2016**	2004
10	Aniek van Koot	Wheelchair women's doubles	2010	2010	2012	2013	**2016**	2012
11	Stéphane Houdet (2)	Wheelchair men's doubles	2014	2009	2013	2011	**2016**	2012
12	Nicolas Peifer	Wheelchair men's doubles	2016	2011	2015	2011	2016	**2016**
13	Dylan Alcott	Wheelchair quad singles	2015	2019	**2019**	2015	2016	2018
14	David Wagner	Wheelchair quad doubles	2008	2019	**2021**	2007	2004	2005
15	Diede de Groot	Wheelchair women's singles	2018	2019	2017	2018	**2021**	2017
16	Diede de Groot (2)	Wheelchair women's doubles	2019	2018	2018	2017	**2021**	2016
17	Aniek van Koot (2)	Wheelchair women's doubles	2013	2013	2013	2015	**2021**	2012
18	Stéphane Houdet (3)	Wheelchair men's doubles	2015	2010	2014	2014	**2021**	2013
19	Shingo Kunieda (2)	Wheelchair men's singles	2007	2007	**2022**	2007	2008	2012
20	Sam Schröder	Wheelchair quad doubles	**2023**	2020	2022	2021	2021	2021
21	Niels Vink	Wheelchair quad doubles	**2023**	2022	2022	2021	2021	2019
22	Yui Kamiji	Wheelchair women's doubles	2014	2014	2014	2014	**2024**	2013
23	Gordon Reid	Wheelchair men's doubles	2017	2015	2016	2015	**2024**	2013
24	Alfie Hewett	Wheelchair men's doubles	2020	2020	2016	2017	**2024**	2017
25	Sam Schröder (2)	Wheelchair quad doubles	**2025**	2022	2023	2022	2024	2022
26	(Japan) Tokito Oda	Wheelchair men's singles	2024	2023	2023	**2025**	2024	2022
27	Niels Vink (2)	Wheelchair quad doubles	**2026**	2024	2023	2022	2024	2021
28	Niels Vink (3)	Wheelchair quad singles	**2026**	2022	2023	2022	2024	2021
29	Yui Kamiji (5)	Wheelchair women's singles	2017	2014	**2026**	2014	2024	2013

== See also ==
- Lists of tennis records and statistics
- List of Grand Slam men's singles champions
- List of Grand Slam women's singles champions
- List of Grand Slam men's doubles champions
- List of Grand Slam women's doubles champions
- List of Grand Slam mixed doubles champions
- All-time tennis records – Men's singles
- All-time tennis records – Women's singles
- Open Era tennis records – Men's singles
- Open Era tennis records – Women's singles
