= Wheelchair tennis at the 1992 Summer Paralympics – Men's singles =

Wheelchair tennis – Men's singles at the IX Paralympic Games
- Paralympic wheelchair tennis
- Competitors: 32

Medalists
| 1st place, gold medalist(s) | | Randy Snow | United States |
| 2nd place, silver medalist(s) | | Kai Schramayer | Germany |
| 3rd place, bronze medalist(s) | | Laurent Giammartini | France |

Men's singles
- Wheelchair tennis at the 1992 Summer Paralympics

Events
| Singles | men | women |
| Doubles | men | women |
- Summer Paralympics

The men's singles wheelchair tennis competition at the 1992 Summer Paralympics in Barcelona.

The United States' Randy Snow defeated Germany's Kai Schramayer in the final, 2–6, 6–4, 6–3 to win the inaugural gold medal in men's singles wheelchair tennis at the 1992 Barcelona Paralympics. In the bronze medal match, France's Laurent Giammartini defeated Australia's Michael Connell.

== Draw ==
=== Key ===
- INV = Bipartite invitation
- IP = ITF place
- ALT = Alternate
- r = Retired
- w/o = Walkover

=== Finals ===
Semifinals
Randy Snow (USA) | 6 | 6 | 6
Michael Connell (AUS) | 7 | 4 | 3
Kai Schramayer (GER) | 6 | 6
Laurent Giammartini (FRA) | 2 | 2

Final (gold medal match)
Randy Snow (USA) | 2 | 6 | 6
Kai Schramayer (GER) | 6 | 4 | 3
Bronze medal match
Michael Connell (AUS) | 1 | 0
Laurent Giammartini (FRA) | 6 | 4

==== Top half ====
1/16-Final
R Snow (USA) | 6 | 6
A Focardi (ITA) | 0 | 1
K Barnes (NZL) | 3 | 3
J Mistry (GBR) | 6 | 6
B Goldblat (SUI) | 6 | 6
M Iwasaki (JPN) | 4 | 4
M Legner (AUT) | 6 | 6
S Bitterauf (GER) | 3 | 3
M Connell (AUS) | 6 | 6
P Johnson (CAN) | 1 | 0
P Cameron (CAN) | 1 | 0
S Douglas (USA) | 6 | 6
J Black (USA) | 6 | 6
J Sorensen (NZL) | 1 | 0
J Ros (ESP) | 1 | 1
A Naili (FRA) | 6 | 6

1/8-Final
R Snow (USA) | 6 | 6
J Mistry (GBR) | 3 | 3
B Goldblat (SUI) | 3 | 2
M Legner (AUT) | 6 | 6
M Connell (AUS) | 6 | 6
S Douglas (USA) | 4 | 0
J Black (USA) | 3 | 6 | 6
A Naili (FRA) | 6 | 4 | 7

Quarterfinals
R Snow (USA) | 6 | 6
M Legner (AUT) | 4 | 1
M Connell (AUS) | 7 | 6
A Naili (FRA) | 6 | 4

Semifinals
R Snow (USA) | 6 | 6 | 6
M Connell (AUS) | 7 | 4 | 3

==== Bottom half ====
1/16-Final
K Schramayer (GER) | 6 | 6
V Garcia (ESP) | 0 | 1
Y Omori (JPN) | 3 | 2
A Vainberg (ISR) | 6 | 6
S Ben-Yoram (ISR) | 6 | 6 | 6
M Erni (SUI) | 4 | 7 | 1
D Hall (AUS) | 3 | 1
B Parks (USA) | 6 | 6
R Troppacher (AUT) | 6 | 6
T Caillier (FRA) | 0 | 3
J Larsson (SWE) | 3 | 3
S Hatt (GBR) | 6 | 6
M Porciani (ITA) | 3 | 2
K Dufvenberg (SWE) | 6 | 6
R de Meersman (BEL) | 2 | 1
L Giammartini (FRA) | 6 | 6

1/8-Final
K Schramayer (GER) | 6 | 6
A Vainberg (ISR) | 1 | 0
S Ben-Yoram (ISR) | 1 | 2
B Parks (USA) | 6 | 6
R Troppacher (AUT) | 6 | 6
S Hatt (GBR) | 3 | 2
K Dufvenberg (SWE) | 0 | 0
L Giammartini (FRA) | 6 | 6

Quarterfinals
K Schramayer (GER) | 6 | 6
B Parks (USA) | 3 | 4
R Troppacher (AUT) | 0 | 2
L Giammartini (FRA) | 6 | 6

Semifinals
K Schramayer (GER) | 6 | 6
L Giammartini (FRA) | 2 | 2
