= Wheelchair tennis at the 1992 Summer Paralympics – Men's doubles =

Wheelchair tennis – Men's doubles at the IX Paralympic Games
- Paralympic wheelchair tennis

Medalists
1st place, gold medalist(s)		Brad Parks; Randy Snow	United States
2nd place, silver medalist(s)		Thierry Caillier; Laurent Giammartini	France
3rd place, bronze medalist(s)		Kai Schramayer; Stefan Bitterauf	Germany

Men's doubles
- Wheelchair tennis at the 1992 Summer Paralympics

Events
Singles	men	women
Doubles	men	women
- Summer Paralympics

The men's doubles wheelchair tennis competition at the 1992 Summer Paralympics in Barcelona.

== Draw ==
=== Key ===
- INV = Bipartite invitation
- IP = ITF place
- ALT = Alternate
- r = Retired
- w/o = Walkover

=== Finals ===
Semifinals
Brad Parks (USA); Randy Snow (USA)	7	6
Kai Schramayer (GER); Stefan Bitterauf (GER)	5	0
Martin Legner (AUT); Robert Troppacher (AUT)	1	2
Thierry Caillier (FRA); Laurent Giammartini (FRA)	6	6

Final (gold medal match)
Brad Parks (USA); Randy Snow (USA)	6	6	6
Thierry Caillier (FRA); Laurent Giammartini (FRA)	4	7	3
Bronze medal match
Kai Schramayer (GER); Stefan Bitterauf (GER)	6	7	6
Martin Legner (AUT); Robert Troppacher (AUT)	7	6	3

==== Top half ====
1/8-Final
B Parks (USA); R Snow (USA)
BYE
S Ben-Yoram (ISR); A Vainberg (ISR)	3	7	2
M Iwasaki (JPN); Y Omori (JPN)	6	6	6
K Schramayer (GER); S Bitterauf (GER)	6	6
K Dufvenberg (SWE); J Larsson (SWE)	0	2
A Focardi (ITA); M Porciani (ITA)	6	5	2
P Cameron (CAN); P Johnson (CAN)	4	7	6

Quarterfinals
B Parks (USA); R Snow (USA)	6	6
M Iwasaki (JPN); Y Omori (JPN)	3	1
K Schramayer (GER); S Bitterauf (GER)	6	6
P Cameron (CAN); P Johnson (CAN)	2	2

Semifinals
B Parks (USA); R Snow (USA)	7	6
K Schramayer (GER); S Bitterauf (GER)	5	0

==== Bottom half ====
1/8-Final
J Sorensen (NZL); K Barnes (NZL)	4	3
S Hatt (GBR); J Mistry (GBR)	6	6
M Legner (AUT); R Troppacher (AUT)	6	6
D Hall (AUS); M Connell (AUS)	4	2
M Erni (SUI); B Goldblat (SUI)	6	6	6
V Garcia (ESP); J Ros (ESP)	7	1	2
BYE
T Caillier (FRA); L Giammartini (FRA)

Quarterfinals
S Hatt (GBR); J Mistry (GBR)	2	2
M Legner (AUT); R Troppacher (AUT)	6	6
M Erni (SUI); B Goldblat (SUI)	2	0
T Caillier (FRA); L Giammartini (FRA)	6	6

Semifinals
M Legner (AUT); R Troppacher (AUT)	1	2
T Caillier (FRA); L Giammartini (FRA)	6	6
