= World Tennis Champions =

World Tennis (formerly the International Tennis Federation; ITF) designates a World Champion each year based on its own majority opinion of performances throughout the year, emphasizing the Grand Slam tournaments, and also considering team events such as the Davis Cup and Billie Jean King Cup. Men's and women's singles champions were first named in 1978; the title is now also awarded for doubles, wheelchair, and junior players. It is sometimes named the "Player of the Year" award, alluding to similar other year-end awards in tennis.

== Rules and procedures ==
The World Tennis constitution states that no tennis tournament can be designated the "World Championships" without unanimous consent of the World Tennis Council. There is currently no such tournament. From its 1913 foundation until 1923, World Tennis (then called the ILTF) recognised Wimbledon as the World Grass Court Championships and tournaments in France as the World Hard Court Championships and World Covered Court Championships. The United States National Lawn Tennis Association refused to join the ILTF until this Eurocentric situation was changed, so in 1923 the World Championships were abolished, and subsequently the most prestigious ILTF designation has been "Official Championships", for the four Grand Slam tournaments. The International Olympic Committee removed tennis from the Olympics for several reasons, including the implication that the Olympic tennis champion was not an officially recognised world champion. (Tennis returned at the 1988 Summer Olympics.)

The World Tennis constitution also states:

The ITF may award the title of World Champion to players who, in the opinion of the Board of Directors, are the most outstanding players in any year. The names of players who have been awarded this title shall be listed in the Roll of Honour.

The opinion of the Board of Directors is taken to be equivalent to the majority opinions of the members of the Board.

It also states:

Official Tennis Championships [i.e. the Grand Slam events] will carry the most weight in the determination of the World Champions for each year.

The boys' and girls' singles and doubles titles prior to 2003 were awarded based on world ranking. Since then singles and doubles rankings have been combined in a single award each for boys and for girls.

The world champion accolade has been extended by World Tennis to wheelchair tennis players of the Men's and Women's division since 1991 and also based on world ranking. In November 2017, World Tennis announced that the quad wheelchair tennis division is to be recognised in its annual list of World Champions.

In 1996, the Philippe Chatrier Award was introduced, honouring individuals or organisations who have made outstanding contributions to tennis globally, both on and off the court. The award is considered to be World Tennis' highest accolade and is named after the French player Philippe Chatrier, who was President of the governing body between 1977 and 1991.

The World Champions Dinner takes place annually to honour the previous year's champions, who are presented with a trophy, but not any monetary prize. The dinner was held during the French Open up until 2022, but since 2023 has been held during Wimbledon.

For 2020 there were no World Champion awards given due to the COVID-19 pandemic. The tennis season was suspended for about 5 months for both the female and the male tennis players.

== Men's singles ==
The first men's panel in 1978 had three members, Don Budge, Fred Perry, and Lew Hoad, who attended the season's Grand Slam events at World Tennis' (then known as ITF) expense to inform their choice. The 1983 panel split two to one between John McEnroe (votes of Budge and Perry) and Mats Wilander (vote of Hoad). The 1984 panel had five members, while the 1985 panel had four: Budge, Perry, Hoad, and Tony Trabert. When Ivan Lendl was chosen as champion for 1985, the panel's announcement was accompanied with a rebuke for Lendl's criticism of some tournaments and his refusal to play in the Davis Cup. Perry and Trabert were on the 1986 panel, with performances outside the Grand Slams taken into consideration.

The 1990 designation of Lendl as champion was a surprise. That year, the Association of Tennis Professionals named Stefan Edberg its "Player of The Year", in accordance with the ATP rankings, while Tennis Magazine (France) ranked Edberg first, Andre Agassi second, and Lendl third. Tennis also suggested the ITF was punishing Edberg for denigrating the Grand Slam Cup tournament it had introduced. The ITF panel, of Perry, Trabert, and Frank Sedgman, called it "the toughest decision any of us can remember having to make", and stated it was Lendl's better average performance in the Grand Slams that made the difference.

Other instances when World Tennis' choices differed from the ATP rankings are 1978, with Bjorn Borg being favoured over Jimmy Connors; 1982, with Connors favoured over McEnroe; 1989, with Boris Becker favoured over Lendl; 2013 with Novak Djokovic favoured over Rafael Nadal; 2022 with Nadal favoured over Carlos Alcaraz; and 2025 with Jannik Sinner favoured over Alcaraz.

Year	Player
1978	(Sweden) Björn Borg
1979	(Sweden) Björn Borg (2)
1980	(Sweden) Björn Borg (3)
1981	(United States) John McEnroe
1982	(United States) Jimmy Connors
1983	(United States) John McEnroe (2)
1984	(United States) John McEnroe (3)
1985	(Czechoslovakia) Ivan Lendl
1986	(Czechoslovakia) Ivan Lendl (2)
1987	(Czechoslovakia) Ivan Lendl (3)
1988	(Sweden) Mats Wilander
1989	(West Germany) Boris Becker
1990	(Czechoslovakia) Ivan Lendl (4)
1991	(Sweden) Stefan Edberg
1992	(United States) Jim Courier
1993	(United States) Pete Sampras
1994	(United States) Pete Sampras (2)
1995	(United States) Pete Sampras (3)
1996	(United States) Pete Sampras (4)
1997	(United States) Pete Sampras (5)
1998	(United States) Pete Sampras (6)
1999	(United States) Andre Agassi
2000	(Brazil) Gustavo Kuerten
2001	(Australia) Lleyton Hewitt
2002	(Australia) Lleyton Hewitt (2)
2003	(United States) Andy Roddick
2004	(Switzerland) Roger Federer
2005	(Switzerland) Roger Federer (2)
2006	(Switzerland) Roger Federer (3)
2007	(Switzerland) Roger Federer (4)
2008	(Spain) Rafael Nadal
2009	(Switzerland) Roger Federer (5)
2010	(Spain) Rafael Nadal (2)
2011	(Serbia) Novak Djokovic
2012	(Serbia) Novak Djokovic (2)
2013	(Serbia) Novak Djokovic (3)
2014	(Serbia) Novak Djokovic (4)
2015	(Serbia) Novak Djokovic (5)
2016	(United Kingdom) Andy Murray
2017	(Spain) Rafael Nadal (3)
2018	(Serbia) Novak Djokovic (6)
2019	(Spain) Rafael Nadal (4)
2020	No award due to COVID-19 pandemic
2021	(Serbia) Novak Djokovic (7)
2022	(Spain) Rafael Nadal (5)
2023	(Serbia) Novak Djokovic (8)
2024	(Italy) Jannik Sinner
2025	(Italy) Jannik Sinner (2)

Total	Player
8	Novak Djokovic (SRB)
6	Pete Sampras (USA)
5	Roger Federer (SUI)
5	Rafael Nadal (ESP)
4	Ivan Lendl (TCH)
3	Björn Borg (SWE)
3	John McEnroe (USA)
2	Lleyton Hewitt (AUS)
2	Jannik Sinner (ITA)
1	Jimmy Connors (USA)
1	Mats Wilander (SWE)
1	Boris Becker (GER)
1	Stefan Edberg (SWE)
1	Jim Courier (USA)
1	Andre Agassi (USA)
1	Gustavo Kuerten (BRA)
1	Andy Roddick (USA)
1	Andy Murray (GBR)

== Women's singles ==
The women's panel initially featured three former women's champions, Margaret Court, Margaret duPont and Ann Jones. Althea Gibson was a member through the early 1980s.

World Champions for women differed from the WTA year-end rankings the following years: 1978 (Martina Navratilova), 1994 (Steffi Graf), 2001 (Lindsay Davenport), 2004 (Lindsay Davenport), 2005 (Lindsay Davenport), 2011 (Caroline Wozniacki), 2012 (Victoria Azarenka), 2017 (Simona Halep), 2023 (Iga Świątek), 2024 (Aryna Sabalenka).

Year	Player
1978	(United States) Chris Evert
1979	(United States) Martina Navratilova
1980	(United States) Chris Evert (2)
1981	(United States) Chris Evert (3)
1982	(United States) Martina Navratilova (2)
1983	(United States) Martina Navratilova (3)
1984	(United States) Martina Navratilova (4)
1985	(United States) Martina Navratilova (5)
1986	(United States) Martina Navratilova (6)
1987	(Germany) Steffi Graf
1988	(Germany) Steffi Graf (2)
1989	(Germany) Steffi Graf (3)
1990	(Germany) Steffi Graf (4)
1991	(Socialist Federal Republic of Yugoslavia) Monica Seles
1992	(Socialist Federal Republic of Yugoslavia) Monica Seles (2)
1993	(Germany) Steffi Graf (5)
1994	(Spain) Arantxa Sánchez Vicario
1995	(Germany) Steffi Graf (6)
1996	(Germany) Steffi Graf (7)
1997	(Switzerland) Martina Hingis
1998	(United States) Lindsay Davenport
1999	(Switzerland) Martina Hingis (2)
2000	(Switzerland) Martina Hingis (3)
2001	(United States) Jennifer Capriati
2002	(United States) Serena Williams
2003	(Belgium) Justine Henin
2004	(Russia) Anastasia Myskina
2005	(Belgium) Kim Clijsters
2006	(Belgium) Justine Henin (2)
2007	(Belgium) Justine Henin (3)
2008	(Serbia) Jelena Janković
2009	(United States) Serena Williams (2)
2010	(Denmark) Caroline Wozniacki
2011	(Czech Republic) Petra Kvitová
2012	(United States) Serena Williams (3)
2013	(United States) Serena Williams (4)
2014	(United States) Serena Williams (5)
2015	(United States) Serena Williams (6)
2016	(Germany) Angelique Kerber
2017	(Spain) Garbiñe Muguruza
2018	(Romania) Simona Halep
2019	(Australia) Ashleigh Barty
2020	No award due to COVID-19 pandemic
2021	(Australia) Ashleigh Barty (2)
2022	(Poland) Iga Świątek
2023	Aryna Sabalenka
2024	(Poland) Iga Świątek (2)
2025	Aryna Sabalenka (2)

Total	Player
7	Steffi Graf (GER)
6	Martina Navratilova (USA)
6	Serena Williams (USA)
3	Chris Evert (USA)
3	Martina Hingis (SUI)
3	Justine Henin (BEL)
2	Monica Seles (YUG)
2	Ashleigh Barty (AUS)
2	(Poland) Iga Świątek
2	Aryna Sabalenka
1	(Spain) Arantxa Sánchez Vicario
1	(United States) Lindsay Davenport
1	(United States) Jennifer Capriati
1	(Russia) Anastasia Myskina
1	(Belgium) Kim Clijsters
1	(Serbia) Jelena Janković
1	(Denmark) Caroline Wozniacki
1	(Czech Republic) Petra Kvitová
1	(Germany) Angelique Kerber
1	(Spain) Garbiñe Muguruza
1	(Romania) Simona Halep

== Doubles ==
=== Men's doubles ===
Year	Player
1996	(Australia) Todd Woodbridge & Mark Woodforde
1997	(Australia) Todd Woodbridge (2) & Mark Woodforde (2)
1998	(Netherlands) Jacco Eltingh & (Netherlands) Paul Haarhuis
1999	(India) Mahesh Bhupathi & (India) Leander Paes
2000	(Australia) Todd Woodbridge (3) & Mark Woodforde (3)
2001	(Sweden) Jonas Björkman & (Australia) Todd Woodbridge (4)
2002	(The Bahamas) Mark Knowles & (Canada) Daniel Nestor
2003	(United States) Bob Bryan & Mike Bryan
2004	(United States) Bob Bryan (2) & Mike Bryan (2)
2005	(United States) Bob Bryan (3) & Mike Bryan (3)
2006	(United States) Bob Bryan (4) & Mike Bryan (4)
2007	(United States) Bob Bryan (5) & Mike Bryan (5)
2008	(Canada) Daniel Nestor (2) & (Serbia) Nenad Zimonjić
2009	(United States) Bob Bryan (6) & Mike Bryan (6)
2010	(United States) Bob Bryan (7) & Mike Bryan (7)
2011	(United States) Bob Bryan (8) & Mike Bryan (8)
2012	(United States) Bob Bryan (9) & Mike Bryan (9)
2013	(United States) Bob Bryan (10) & Mike Bryan (10)
2014	(United States) Bob Bryan (11) & Mike Bryan (11)
2015	(Netherlands) Jean-Julien Rojer & (Romania) Horia Tecău
2016	(United Kingdom) Jamie Murray & (Brazil) Bruno Soares
2017	(Poland) Łukasz Kubot & (Brazil) Marcelo Melo
2018	(United States) Mike Bryan (12) & (United States) Jack Sock
2019	(Colombia) Juan Sebastián Cabal & (Colombia) Robert Farah
2020	No award due to COVID-19 pandemic
2021	(Croatia) Nikola Mektić & (Croatia) Mate Pavić
2022	(United Kingdom) Joe Salisbury & (United States) Rajeev Ram
2023	(United Kingdom) Joe Salisbury (2) & (United States) Rajeev Ram (2)
2024	(El Salvador) Marcelo Arévalo & (Croatia) Mate Pavić (2)
2025	(Spain) Marcel Granollers & (Argentina) Horacio Zeballos

=== Women's doubles ===
Year	Player
1996	(United States) Lindsay Davenport & (United States) Mary Joe Fernández
1997	(United States) Lindsay Davenport (2) & (Czech Republic) Jana Novotná
1998	(United States) Lindsay Davenport (3) & (Belarus) Natasha Zvereva
1999	(Switzerland) Martina Hingis & (Russia) Anna Kournikova
2000	(France) Julie Halard-Decugis & (Japan) Ai Sugiyama
2001	(United States) Lisa Raymond & (Australia) Rennae Stubbs
2002	(Spain) Virginia Ruano Pascual & (Argentina) Paola Suárez
2003	(Spain) Virginia Ruano Pascual (2) & (Argentina) Paola Suárez (2)
2004	(Spain) Virginia Ruano Pascual (3) & (Argentina) Paola Suárez (3)
2005	(United States) Lisa Raymond (2) & (Australia) Samantha Stosur
2006	(United States) Lisa Raymond (3) & (Australia) Samantha Stosur (2)
2007	(Zimbabwe) Cara Black & (United States) Liezel Huber
2008	(Zimbabwe) Cara Black (2) & (United States) Liezel Huber (2)
2009	(United States) Serena Williams & Venus Williams
2010	(Argentina) Gisela Dulko & (Italy) Flavia Pennetta
2011	(Czech Republic) Květa Peschke & (Slovenia) Katarina Srebotnik
2012	(Italy) Sara Errani & (Italy) Roberta Vinci
2013	(Italy) Sara Errani (2) & (Italy) Roberta Vinci (2)
2014	(Italy) Sara Errani (3) & (Italy) Roberta Vinci (3)
2015	(Switzerland) Martina Hingis (2) & (India) Sania Mirza
2016	(France) Caroline Garcia & (France) Kristina Mladenovic
2017	(Switzerland) Martina Hingis (3) & (Chinese Taipei) Chan Yung-jan
2018	(Czech Republic) Barbora Krejčíková & (Czech Republic) Kateřina Siniaková
2019	(Hungary) Tímea Babos & (France) Kristina Mladenovic (2)
2020	No award due to COVID-19 pandemic
2021	(Czech Republic) Barbora Krejčíková (2) & (Czech Republic) Kateřina Siniaková (2)
2022	(Czech Republic) Barbora Krejčíková (3) & (Czech Republic) Kateřina Siniaková (3)
2023	(Australia) Storm Hunter & (Belgium) Elise Mertens
2024	(Italy) Sara Errani (4) & (Italy) Jasmine Paolini
2025	(Italy) Sara Errani (5) & (Italy) Jasmine Paolini (2)

== Junior ==
=== Boys' combined (2004– ) ===
Year	Player
2004	(France) Gaël Monfils
2005	(United States) Donald Young
2006	(Netherlands) Thiemo de Bakker
2007	(Lithuania) Ričardas Berankis
2008	(Chinese Taipei) Yang Tsung-hua
2009	(Sweden) Daniel Berta
2010	(Colombia) Juan Sebastián Gómez
2011	(Czech Republic) Jiří Veselý
2012	(Canada) Filip Peliwo
2013	(Germany) Alexander Zverev
2014	(Russia) Andrey Rublev
2015	(United States) Taylor Fritz
2016	(Serbia) Miomir Kecmanović
2017	(Argentina) Axel Geller
2018	(Chinese Taipei) Tseng Chun-hsin
2019	(Argentina) Thiago Agustin Tirante
2020	No award due to COVID-19 pandemic
2021	(China) Shang Juncheng
2022	(Belgium) Gilles-Arnaud Bailly
2023	(Brazil) João Fonseca
2024	(Norway) Nicolai Budkov Kjær
2025	(Bulgaria) Ivan Ivanov

=== Girls' combined (2004– ) ===
Year	Player
2004	(Netherlands) Michaëlla Krajicek
2005	(Belarus) Victoria Azarenka
2006	(Russia) Anastasia Pavlyuchenkova
2007	(Poland) Urszula Radwańska
2008	(Thailand) Noppawan Lertcheewakarn
2009	(France) Kristina Mladenovic
2010	(Russia) Daria Gavrilova
2011	(Russia) Irina Khromacheva
2012	(United States) Taylor Townsend
2013	(Switzerland) Belinda Bencic
2014	(United States) Catherine "CiCi" Bellis
2015	(Hungary) Dalma Gálfi
2016	(Russia) Anastasia Potapova
2017	(United States) Whitney Osuigwe
2018	(France) Clara Burel
2019	(France) Diane Parry
2020	No award due to COVID-19 pandemic
2021	(Croatia) Petra Marčinko
2022	(Czech Republic) Lucie Havlíčková
2023	(Russia) Alina Korneeva
2024	(Australia) Emerson Jones
2025	(United States) Kristina Penickova

=== Singles (1978–2003) ===
==== Boys' singles ====
Year	Player
1978	(Czechoslovakia) Ivan Lendl
1979	(Ecuador) Raúl Viver
1980	(France) Thierry Tulasne
1981	(Australia) Pat Cash
1982	(France) Guy Forget
1983	(Sweden) Stefan Edberg
1984	(Australia) Mark Kratzmann
1985	(Italy) Claudio Pistolesi
1986	(Spain) Javier Sánchez
1987	(Australia) Jason Stoltenberg
1988	(Venezuela) Nicolás Pereira
1989	(Sweden) Nicklas Kulti
1990	(Italy) Andrea Gaudenzi
1991	(Sweden) Thomas Enqvist
1992	(United States) Brian Dunn
1993	(Chile) Marcelo Ríos
1994	(Argentina) Federico Browne
1995	(Argentina) Mariano Zabaleta
1996	(France) Sébastien Grosjean
1997	(France) Arnaud Di Pasquale
1998	(Switzerland) Roger Federer
1999	(Denmark) Kristian Pless
2000	(United States) Andy Roddick
2001	(Luxembourg) Gilles Müller
2002	(France) Richard Gasquet
2003	(Cyprus) Marcos Baghdatis

==== Girls' singles ====
Year	Player
1978	(Czechoslovakia) Hana Mandlíková
1979	(United States) Mary-Lou Piatek
1980	(United States) Susan Mascarin
1981	(United States) Zina Garrison
1982	(United States) Gretchen Rush
1983	(France) Pascale Paradis
1984	(Argentina) Gabriela Sabatini
1985	(Italy) Laura Garrone
1986	(Argentina) Patricia Tarabini
1987	(Soviet Union) Natalia Zvereva
1988	(Argentina) Cristina Tessi
1989	(Argentina) Florencia Labat
1990	(Czechoslovakia) Karina Habšudová
1991	(Czechoslovakia) Zdeňka Málková
1992	(Paraguay) Rossana de los Ríos
1993	(Georgia (country)) Nino Louarsabishvili
1994	(Switzerland) Martina Hingis
1995	(Russia) Anna Kournikova
1996	(France) Amélie Mauresmo
1997	(Zimbabwe) Cara Black
1998	(Australia) Jelena Dokić
1999	(Russia) Lina Krasnoroutskaya
2000	(Argentina) María Emilia Salerni
2001	(Russia) Svetlana Kuznetsova
2002	(Czechoslovakia) Barbora Strýcová
2003	(Belgium) Kirsten Flipkens

=== Doubles (1978–2003) ===
==== Boys' doubles ====
Year	Player
1982	(Mexico) Fernando Pérez Pascal
1983	(Australia) Mark Kratzmann
1984	(Mexico) Agustín Moreno
1985	(Czechoslovakia) Petr Korda & (Czechoslovakia) Cyril Suk
1986	(Spain) Tomás Carbonell
1987	(Australia) Jason Stoltenberg
1988	(Czechoslovakia) David Rikl & (Czechoslovakia) Tomáš Anzari
1989	(South Africa) Wayne Ferreira
1990	(Sweden) Mårten Renström
1991	(Morocco) Karim Alami
1992	(Mexico) Enrique Abaroa
1993	(New Zealand) Steven Downs
1994	(Australia) Benjamin Ellwood
1995	(Venezuela) Kepler Orellana
1996	(France) Sébastien Grosjean
1997	(Chile) Nicolás Massú
1998	(Venezuela) José de Armas
1999	(France) Julien Benneteau & (France) Nicolas Mahut
2000	(United Kingdom) Lee Childs & (United Kingdom) James Nelson
2001	(Mexico) Bruno Echagaray & (Mexico) Santiago González
2002	(Romania) Florin Mergea & (Romania) Horia Tecău
2003	(United States) Scott Oudsema

==== Girls' doubles ====
Year	Player
1982	(United States) Beth Herr
1983	(Soviet Union) Larisa Savchenko
1984	(Argentina) Mercedes Paz
1985	(Argentina) Mariana Perez-Roldan & (Argentina) Patricia Tarabini
1986	(Soviet Union) Leila Meskhi
1987	(Soviet Union) Natalia Medvedeva
1988	(Australia) Jo-Anne Faull
1989	(Czechoslovakia) Andrea Strnadová
1990	(Czechoslovakia) Karina Habšudová
1991	(Czechoslovakia) Eva Martincová
1992	(Belgium) Nancy Feber & (Belgium) Laurence Courtois
1993	(United States) Cristina Moros
1994	(Slovenia) Martina Nedelkova
1995	(Czech Republic) Ludmila Varmuzova
1996	(Czech Republic) Jitka Schönfeldová & (Czechoslovakia) Michaela Paštiková
1997	(Kazakhstan) Irina Selyutina & (Zimbabwe) Cara Black
1998	(Denmark) Eva Dyrberg
1999	(Czech Republic) Daniela Bedáňová
2000	(Argentina) María Emilia Salerni
2001	(Czech Republic) Petra Cetkovská
2002	(Belgium) Elke Clijsters
2003	(Czech Republic) Andrea Hlaváčková

== Wheelchair ==
=== Men's wheelchair ===
Year	Player
1991	(United States) Randy Snow
1992	(France) Laurent Giammartini
1993	(Germany) Kai Schramayer
1994	(France) Laurent Giammartini (2)
1995	(Australia) David Hall
1996	(Netherlands) Ricky Molier
1997	(Netherlands) Ricky Molier (2)
1998	(Australia) David Hall (2)
1999	(United States) Stephen Welch
2000	(Australia) David Hall (3)
2001	(Netherlands) Ricky Molier (3)
2002	(Australia) David Hall (4)
2003	(Australia) David Hall (5)
2004	(Australia) David Hall (6)
2005	(France) Michaël Jeremiasz
2006	(Netherlands) Robin Ammerlaan
2007	(Japan) Shingo Kunieda
2008	(Japan) Shingo Kunieda (2)
2009	(Japan) Shingo Kunieda (3)
2010	(Japan) Shingo Kunieda (4)
2011	(Netherlands) Maikel Scheffers
2012	(France) Stéphane Houdet
2013	(Japan) Shingo Kunieda (5)
2014	(Japan) Shingo Kunieda (6)
2015	(Japan) Shingo Kunieda (7)
2016	(United Kingdom) Gordon Reid
2017	(Argentina) Gustavo Fernández
2018	(Japan) Shingo Kunieda (8)
2019	(Argentina) Gustavo Fernández (2)
2020	No award due to COVID-19 pandemic
2021	(Japan) Shingo Kunieda (9)
2022	(Japan) Shingo Kunieda (10)
2023	(United Kingdom) Alfie Hewett
2024	(Japan) Tokito Oda
2025	(Japan) Tokito Oda (2)

=== Women's wheelchair ===
Year	Player
1991	(Netherlands) Chantal Vandierendonck
1992	(Netherlands) Monique Van Den Bosch
1993	(Netherlands) Monique Kalkman (2)
1994	(Netherlands) Monique Kalkman (3)
1995	(Netherlands) Monique Kalkman (4)
1996	(Netherlands) Chantal Vandierendonck (2)
1997	(Netherlands) Chantal Vandierendonck (3)
1998	(Australia) Daniela Di Toro
1999	(Australia) Daniela Di Toro (2)
2000	(Netherlands) Esther Vergeer
2001	(Netherlands) Esther Vergeer (2)
2002	(Netherlands) Esther Vergeer (3)
2003	(Netherlands) Esther Vergeer (4)
2004	(Netherlands) Esther Vergeer (5)
2005	(Netherlands) Esther Vergeer (6)
2006	(Netherlands) Esther Vergeer (7)
2007	(Netherlands) Esther Vergeer (8)
2008	(Netherlands) Esther Vergeer (9)
2009	(Netherlands) Esther Vergeer (10)
2010	(Netherlands) Esther Vergeer (11)
2011	(Netherlands) Esther Vergeer (12)
2012	(Netherlands) Esther Vergeer (13)
2013	(Netherlands) Aniek van Koot
2014	(Japan) Yui Kamiji
2015	(Netherlands) Jiske Griffioen
2016	(Netherlands) Jiske Griffioen (2)
2017	(Japan) Yui Kamiji (2)
2018	(Netherlands) Diede de Groot
2019	(Netherlands) Diede de Groot (2)
2020	No award due to COVID-19 pandemic
2021	(Netherlands) Diede de Groot (3)
2022	(Netherlands) Diede de Groot (4)
2023	(Netherlands) Diede de Groot (5)
2024	(Netherlands) Diede de Groot (6)
2025	(Japan) Yui Kamiji (3)

=== Quad's wheelchair ===
Year	Player
2017	(United States) David Wagner
2018	(Australia) Dylan Alcott
2019	(Australia) Dylan Alcott (2)
2020	No award due to COVID-19 pandemic
2021	(Australia) Dylan Alcott (3)
2022	(Netherlands) Niels Vink
2023	(Netherlands) Niels Vink (2)
2024	(Netherlands) Sam Schröder
2025	(Netherlands) Niels Vink (3)

== See also ==
- World number 1 ranked male tennis players
- World number 1 ranked female tennis players
- International Tennis Federation
- Philippe Chatrier Award
- ATP Awards
- WTA Awards
- Tennis statistics
