= Philippe Chatrier Award =

Annual tennis award

- Awarded for: Significant contributions to tennis both on and off the court; Long and outstanding service to the game
- Location: London
- Country: United Kingdom
- Presented by: World Tennis
- First award: 1996; 30 years ago
- Website: Philippe Chatrier Award

The Philippe Chatrier Award is an annual World Tennis award for long and outstanding service to the game of tennis.

== Background ==
World Tennis is the governing body of tennis. It introduced the award in 1996 to recognise individuals or organisations considered to have made outstanding contributions to tennis globally, both on and off the court.

The award is named after the former French tennis player Philippe Chatrier, who was President of the governing body between 1977–1991.

Announced in advance, the award is presented to the recipient at the annual World Tennis Champions' Dinner held in London during Wimbledon. Prior to 2023, the dinner was held in Paris during the French Open.

== List of recipients ==
Chatrier Award Recipients
| Year | Recipient | Role |
|---|---|---|
| 1996 | (Sweden) Stefan Edberg | Player, coach, noted for sportsmanship |
| 1997 | (United States) Chris Evert | Player, coach, tv commentator, former Women's Tennis Association president |
| 1998 | (Australia) Rod Laver | Player dominance, 'the rocket', bridged gap into Open Era |
| 1999 | (Italy) Nicola Pietrangeli | Player, contributions to Italian tennis |
| 2000 | (Spain) Juan Antonio Samaranch | International Olympic Committee President |
| 2001 | (Japan) NEC | Sponsor of the Wheelchair Tennis Tour since 1992 |
| 2002 | (United States) Jack Kramer | Player, promoter, 'father of open tennis' |
| 2003 | (United States) Billie Jean King | Player, pioneer in women's rights and LGBTQ rights |
| 2004 | (France) Yannick Noah | Player, philanthropist, singer |
| 2005 | (United States) Tony Trabert | Player, coach, broadcaster, former ITF president |
| 2006 | (Australia) Margaret Court | Player, mentor |
| 2007 | (United States) John McEnroe | Player, TV commentator, public personality |
| 2008 | (Australia) Neale Fraser | Player, Davis Cup captain for Australia |
| 2009 | (United States) Martina Navratilova | Player, TV personality, activist for women's and gay rights |
| 2010 | (Brazil) Gustavo Kuerten | Player, philanthropist, tennis ambassador particularly in Brazil |
| 2011 | (France) Guy Forget | Player; support of and team captain of France for Davis Cup and Fed Cup (now Billie Jean King Cup |
| 2012 | (Spain) Arantxa Sanchez Vicario | Player, Fed Cup and Olympic ambassador |
| 2013 | (United Kingdom) All England Lawn Tennis Club | Wimbledon host |
| 2014 | (Australia) Todd Woodbridge and Mark Woodforde | Doubles partners, coaches, commentators, administrators and mentors |
| 2015 | (United States) Mary Carillo | TV analyst, philanthropist (former Chairwoman USTA Foundation) |
| 2016 | (United States) Brad Parks | Founder of wheelchair tennis |
| 2017 | (Spain) Sergio Casal and Emilio Sanchez | Doubles partners, opened Sánchez-Casal Tennis Academy |
| 2018 | (Australia) Evonne Goolagong Cawley | Player, advocate for women's tennis and Aboriginal Australians |
| 2019 | (Argentina) Gabriela Sabatini | Player, roles with UNICEF, UNESCO, the Special Olympics and the Youth Olympic Games |
| 2020 | (Spain) Manolo Santana and (Australia) Fred Stolle | Players, coaches, contributors to development in respective countries |
| 2022 | (United States) Stan Smith | Player, coach, partnership with Adidas |
| 2023 | (Belgium) Justine Henin | Player, coach |
| 2024 | (Netherlands) Esther Vergeer | Wheelchair tennis player, disability advocate |
| 2025 | (Germany) Thomas Bach | Honorary President of the International Olympic Committee |
