= Kai Schramayer =

German wheelchair tennis player

- Country (sports): Germany
- Residence: Vancouver, Canada
- Born: 10 January 1968 (age 57); Heidelberg, West Germany
- Turned pro: 1990
- Retired: 2005
- Plays: Right-handed (one-handed backhand)

Singles
- Career titles: 52
- Highest ranking: No. 1 (10 August 1993)

Other tournaments
- Masters: W (1997)
- Paralympic Games: (silver) (1992)

Doubles
- Career titles: 53
- Highest ranking: No. 2 (19 October 1999)
- Masters Doubles: W (2002)
Medal record
Paralympic Games
Silver medal – second place	1992 Barcelona	Men's singles
Bronze medal – third place	1992 Barcelona	Men's doubles
Bronze medal – third place	2000 Sydney	Men's singles

Kai Schramayer (born 10 January 1968) is a retired German wheelchair tennis player who competed at international level events. He was a former World no. 1 in the sport and is a double Paralympic medalist.

Schramayer was a very sporty person: he played ice hockey, volleyball, basketball and soccer at a young age and pursued his interest in tennis aged six years old. He lost his left femur to bone cancer when he was fourteen years old after his mother noticed that her son complained about pain in his leg when going up stairs. After his leg got amputated, he went back to playing tennis with a prosthesis. He soon discovered wheelchair tennis and played competitively in the later 1980s and won many wheelchair doubles titles in 1990 with his partner Randy Snow.
