= Brad Parks (tennis) =

American wheelchair tennis player (born 1957)

- Full name: Brad Alan Parks
- Country (sports): United States
- Born: April 1, 1957 (age 69) Orange, California, U.S.
- Plays: Right-handed
Medal record
Representing United States
Gold medal – first place	1992 Barcelona	Doubles

Brad Alan Parks (born April 1, 1957) is an American wheelchair tennis player who co-invented wheelchair tennis with Jeff Minnebraker.

== Life and career ==
Parks was born in Orange, California. He attended a dental program at the University of Utah. At the age of 18, he participated at a freestyle skiing competition in Park City, Utah. While participating, Parks performed a special skilled stunt which he then went of the ramp from the competition. He was supposed to land on his skis, but then landing on his back in an icebound surface causing him in an injury. With being injured, Parks was paralyzed from his vertebrate anatomy hips. He then created a sport for people with disabilities using wheelchairs, in which Parks had help from tennis player, Jeff Minnebraker, in 1977. Parks creation was wheelchair tennis, in which he thought of the idea in the hospital with his injury. With Minnebraker, they've both created the rules for wheelchair tennis.

As a Uniqlo Wheelchair Tennis Tour player during the 1990s, Parks won five singles and seven doubles titles at Championship Series events. He also reached the quarterfinals at the men's singles event during the 1994 Wheelchair Tennis Masters. Park competed at the 1992 Summer Paralympics, in the first wheelchair tennis competition at the Paralympics Games. During his events, Parks reach the quarterfinals in the men's singles. He was awarded the gold medal with Randy Snow in the men's doubles event.

Parks co-founded the National Foundation of Wheelchair Tennis with Dave Saltz in 1980. He then was the first initialed president of the International Wheelchair Tennis Federation, in 1988. With his creation, the United States Tennis Association created an award called "The Brad Parks Award", in 2002. He became honored in the International Tennis Hall of Fame, being placed on the contributor category, in 2010. In 2016, Parks was the recipient of the Philippe Chatrier Award by the International Tennis Federation. Apart from tennis, Park won medals in wheelchair racing at the World Disabled Olympics and the National Wheelchair Olympics. He joined the Wheelchair Tennis Hall of Champions in 2026 for the International Tennis Federation.
