= Laurent Giammartini =

French wheelchair tennis player

Personal information
- Born: 2 February 1967 (age 59) Paris, France

Sport
- Country: France
- Sport: Wheelchair tennis
Medal record
Men's wheelchair tennis
Representing France
Paralympic Games
Silver medal – second place	1992 Barcelona	Men's doubles
Bronze medal – third place	1992 Barcelona	Men's singles

Laurent Giammartini (born 2 February 1967) is a French wheelchair tennis player. At the 1992 Summer Paralympics held in Barcelona, Spain, he won the silver medal in the men's doubles event together with Thierry Caillier and the bronze medal in the men's singles event. He also represented France at the 1988, 1996 and 2000 Summer Paralympics. He did not win a medal at these events.

He won the ITF World Champion award in men's wheelchair tennis in 1992 and 1994.

In 1995, he won the men's singles event at the Wheelchair Tennis Masters held in Eindhoven, Netherlands. In 1996 and 1998 he finished in second place in this event.
