= Randy Snow =

American wheelchair tennis and basketball player

- Country (sports): United States
- Born: May 24, 1959 Austin, Texas, U.S.
- Died: November 19, 2009 (aged 50) El Salvador
- Retired: 2004
- Plays: Right Handed
- Int. Tennis HoF: 2012 (member page)

Singles
- Career record: 140–36
- Highest ranking: No.2 (March 23, 1993)
- Masters: W (1994)
- Paralympic Games: Gold Medal (1992)

Doubles
- Career record: 70–26
- Highest ranking: No.1 (July 18, 1995)
- Paralympic Games: Gold Medal (1992)
- World Team Cup: Champion (1986, 1987, 1988, 1989, 1990, 1991, 1995)
Medal record
Representing United States
Paralympic Games
Men's athletics
| Silver medal – second place | 1984 Los Angeles | 400m 4 |
| Silver medal – second place | 1984 Los Angeles | 800m 4 |
| Bronze medal – third place | 1984 Los Angeles | 1500m 4 |
Men's wheelchair tennis
| Gold medal – first place | 1992 Barcelona | Singles |
| Gold medal – first place | 1992 Barcelona | Doubles |
Men's wheelchair basketball
| Bronze medal – third place | 1996 Atlanta | Team |

Randy Snow (May 24, 1959 – November 19, 2009) was the first Paralympian to be inducted into the U.S. Olympic Hall of Fame and the first paralympian to win medals in three different sports: track, basketball and tennis.

== Biography ==
Thomas Randall Snow was the oldest of four children of Alison Lee McElhone, a kindergarten teacher, and Thomas Snow, a real estate attorney. He was born in Austin, Texas and later his family moved to Terrell, Texas. In 1975, at the age of 16, his spine was crushed by a 1000-pound bale of hay, leaving him paralyzed from the waist down. After graduating, he enrolled in the University of Texas at Austin in 1977, where he indulged in the fraternity party life, until forming a wheelchair basketball team under the direction of Jim Hayes, the University of Texas at Arlington wheelchair sports director. Soon afterward, he began wheelchair racing, and in 1980 transferred to Arlington in order to work with Hayes, eventually establishing himself as the best wheelchair tennis player in the United States.

In 1984, the Summer Olympics added a men's 1500-meter wheelchair race as an exhibition event. Snow went into heavy training, relocating to Houston, Texas, to train on the same track as Carl Lewis. This was the first Paralympic event to appear before a large audience, and the public was unsure of their feelings for wheelchair-using athletes. Snow received a silver medal, and the crowd gave the athletes a standing ovation at the end of the exhibition.

In the 1990–91 season, Snow won 68 consecutive matches and 15 straight tournaments, becoming the first International Tennis Federation Wheelchair World Champion. Snow went on to win gold medals in the 1992 Summer Paralympics in Barcelona for singles and doubles tennis, and at the 1996 Atlanta Games was a member of the bronze medal-winning wheelchair basketball team. He also competed in men's wheelchair tennis singles at the 2000 Summer Paralympics but lost in the third round to eventual gold medalist David Hall of Australia.

He was inducted into the United States Olympic Hall of Fame on July 1, 2004.

Randy Snow died in El Salvador on November 19, 2009, while volunteering at a wheelchair tennis camp. He was posthumously inducted into the International Tennis Hall of Fame in Newport, Rhode Island, on July 14, 2012.

| Preceded by First Winner | ITF Wheelchair Tennis World Champion; 1991 | Succeeded by Laurent Giammartini |
