= Paul Johnson (wheelchair athlete) =

Canadian wheelchair tennis player (1966–2020)

- Country (sports): Canada
- Born: 9 October 1966 Victoria, British Columbia
- Died: June 10, 2020 (aged 53) Victoria, British Columbia
- Height: 5 ft 11 in (180 cm)
- Turned pro: 1991
- Retired: 2006
- Plays: Right-handed (one-handed backhand)

Singles
- Highest ranking: No. 11 (26 May 1998)

Other tournaments
- Paralympic Games: 3R (2000)

Doubles
- Highest ranking: No. 12 (6 August 2001)

Other doubles tournaments
- Paralympic Games: 2R (1996)

Paul Johnson (October 9, 1966 – June 10, 2020) was a Canadian wheelchair tennis player and Paralympic athlete who competed at international level events and was Canada's former number one wheelchair tennis player. He participated at the Paralympic Games four times; he competed in athletics once at the 1988 Summer Paralympics then played wheelchair tennis three times consecutively from 1992 to 2000.

Johnson died at the age of 53 in his hometown.
