= 2008 Australian Open – Day-by-day summaries =

The 2008 Australian Open described in detail, in the form of day-by-day summaries.

All dates are AEDT (UTC+11)

== Day 1 (14 January) ==
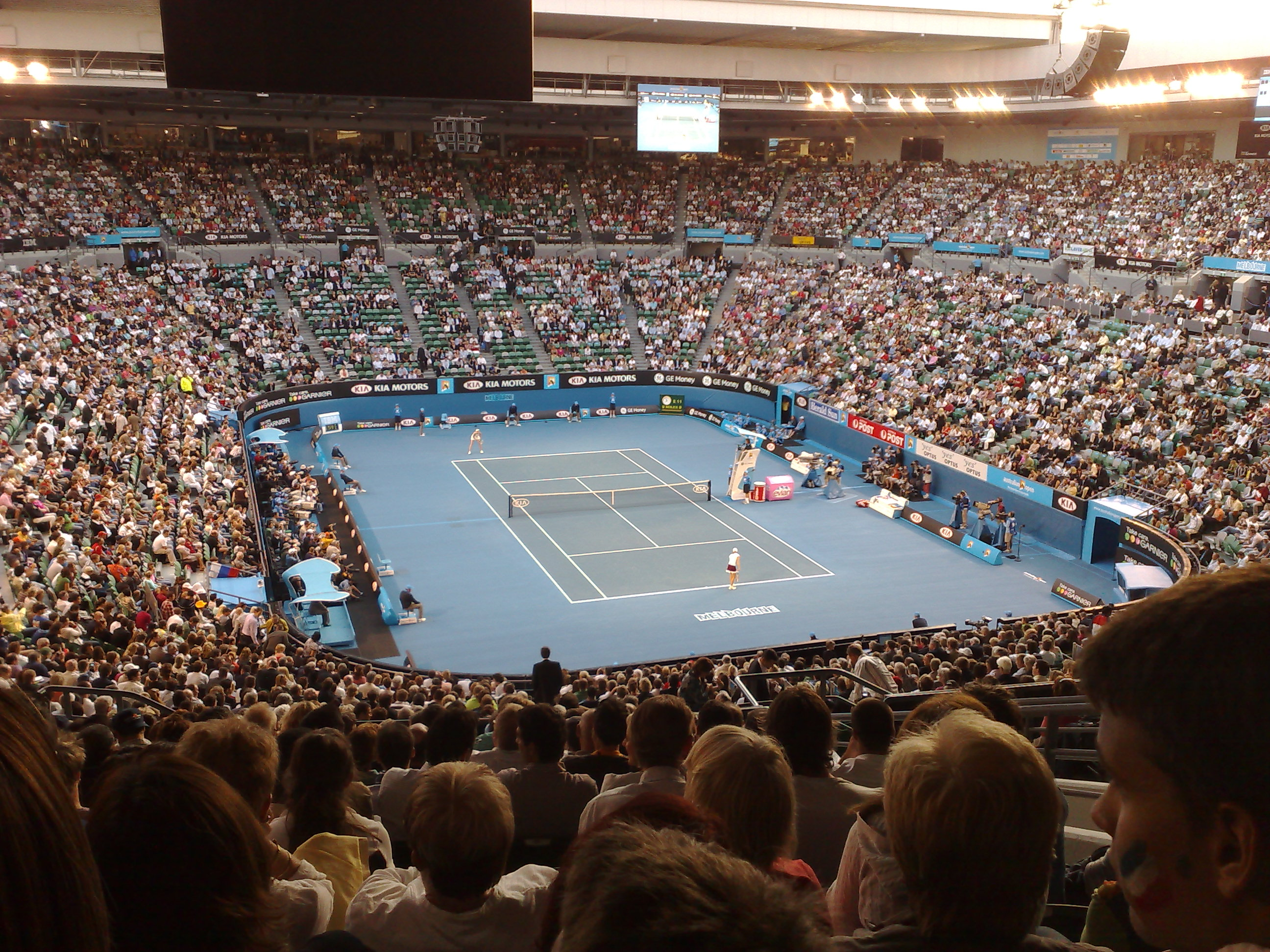
The Rod Laver Arena with the new, blue Plexicushion surface.

Day 1 saw few upsets, as favourites Justine Henin, Serena Williams, Lindsay Davenport, Tatiana Golovin, Maria Sharapova, Shahar Pe'er, Amélie Mauresmo, Nicole Vaidišová, Andy Roddick, Rafael Nadal, Nikolay Davydenko, Richard Gasquet, and Mikhail Youzhny all advanced. Jelena Janković, world No. 3, also advanced but was heavily tested by Tamira Paszek, having to win 2–6, 6–2, 12–10 in three hours, saving three match points; the match featured an exceptional 15 breaks of serve. Finalist Jo-Wilfried Tsonga scored his best victory to that point in a four set win over number 9 seed Andy Murray, 7–5, 6–4, 0–6, 7–6. Home favourite Alicia Molik also advanced into the second round.

- Seeds out:
  - Men's singles: (United Kingdom) Andy Murray [9], (Spain) Carlos Moyá [16], (Argentina) Juan Ignacio Chela [18]
  - Women's singles: (Russia) Vera Zvonareva [23], (Ukraine) Julia Vakulenko [32]

Matches on main courts
Matches on Rod Laver Arena
Event	Winner	Loser	Score
Women's singles 1st round	(United States) Serena Williams [7]	(Australia) Jarmila Gajdošová [WC]	6–3, 6–3
Women's singles 1st round	(Belgium) Justine Henin [1]	(Japan) Aiko Nakamura	6–2, 6–2
Men's singles 1st round	(France) Jo-Wilfried Tsonga	(United Kingdom) Andy Murray [9]	7–5, 6–4, 0–6, 7–6^{(7–5)}
Women's singles 1st round	(Australia) Alicia Molik	(Estonia) Kaia Kanepi	7–6^{(7–4)}, 7–5
Men's singles 1st round	(Spain) Rafael Nadal [2]	(Serbia) Viktor Troicki [Q]	7–6^{(7–3)}, 7–5, 6–1
Matches on Hisense Arena
Event	Winner	Loser	Score
Women's singles 1st round	(Serbia) Jelena Janković [3]	(Austria) Tamira Paszek	2–6, 6–2, 12–10
Men's singles 1st round	(United States) Andy Roddick [6]	(Czech Republic) Lukáš Dlouhý [Q]	6–3, 6–4, 7–5
Women's singles 1st round	(Russia) Maria Sharapova [5]	(Croatia) Jelena Kostanić Tošić	6–4, 6–3
Men's singles 1st round	(France) Richard Gasquet [8]	(Australia) Nick Lindahl [WC]	6–0, 6–1, 3–6, 6–2
Matches on Margaret Court Arena
Event	Winner	Loser	Score
Men's singles 1st round	(Chile) Paul Capdeville	(Australia) Brydan Klein	6–4, 7–5, 6–4
Women's singles 1st round	(United States) Lindsay Davenport [PR]	(Italy) Sara Errani	6–2, 3–6, 7–5
Men's singles 1st round	(Russia) Nikolay Davydenko [4]	(France) Michaël Llodra	7–5, 7–5, 6–3
Men's singles 1st round	(Austria) Stefan Koubek	(Spain) Carlos Moyá [16]	7–6^{(7–5)}, 6–7^{(2–7)}, 7–5, 6–4
Colored background means night matches

== Day 2 (15 January) ==
Favourites Roger Federer, Tomáš Berdych, James Blake, Novak Djokovic, Fernando González, Lleyton Hewitt, Marcos Baghdatis, David Nalbandian, David Ferrer, Marat Safin, Venus Williams, Ana Ivanovic, Anna Chakvetadze, Daniela Hantuchová, and Svetlana Kuznetsova all advanced. Other seeded players such as Li Na, Nadia Petrova, Sania Mirza, Agnieszka Radwańska, Dmitry Tursunov, and Juan Carlos Ferrero also advanced. Sofia Arvidsson caused the upset on the women's side, as she defeated No. 10 Marion Bartoli 6–7, 6–4, 6–3, and Dinara Safina went down to qualifier Sabine Lisicki. On the men's side, the upset of the day came when Dutch qualifier Robin Haase defeated No. 17 Ivan Ljubičić 6–7, 6–3, 6–0, 7–6. Day 2 saw the completion of all the remaining first round matches.

- Seeded players out: Marion Bartoli, Dinara Safina, Ágnes Szávay, Lucie Šafářová; Ivan Ljubičić, Nicolás Almagro, Radek Štěpánek

Matches on main courts
Matches on Rod Laver Arena
Event	Winner	Loser	Score
Men's singles 1st round	(Serbia) Novak Djokovic [3]	(Germany) Benjamin Becker	6–0, 6–2, 7–6^{(7–5)}
Women's singles 1st round	(Russia) Svetlana Kuznetsova [2]	(France) Nathalie Dechy	6–3, 6–1
Men's singles 1st round	(Australia) Lleyton Hewitt [19]	(Belgium) Steve Darcis	6–0, 6–3, 6–0
Women's singles 1st round	(United States) Venus Williams [8]	(China) Yan Zi	6–2, 7–5
Men's singles 1st round	(Switzerland) Roger Federer [1]	(Argentina) Diego Hartfield	6–0, 6–3, 6–0
Matches on Hisense Arena
Event	Winner	Loser	Score
Women's singles 1st round	(Russia) Anna Chakvetadze [6]	(Germany) Andrea Petkovic	0–0, retired
Men's singles 1st round	(Cyprus) Marcos Baghdatis [15]	(Sweden) Thomas Johansson	7–6^{(7–0)}, 6–2, 3–6, 6–3
Women's singles 1st round	(Serbia) Ana Ivanovic [4]	(Romania) Sorana Cîrstea	7–5, 6–3
Men's singles 1st round	(United States) James Blake [12]	(Chile) Nicolás Massú	6–3, 6–2, 6–2
Matches on Margaret Court Arena
Event	Winner	Loser	Score
Women's singles 1st round	(Slovakia) Daniela Hantuchová [9]	(United States) Vania King	6–3, 7–5
Men's singles 1st round	(South Korea) Lee Hyung-taik	(Australia) Chris Guccione	7–6^{(8–6)}, 6–3, 6–4
Men's singles 1st round	(Australia) Peter Luczak	(Argentina) Mariano Zabaleta	6–1, 6–7^{(2–7)}, 6–3, 6–4
Men's singles 1st round	(Chile) Fernando González [7]	(Greece) Konstantinos Economidis [Q]	7–6^{(7–5)}, 6–7^{(2–7)}, 7–5, 6–4
Colored background means night matches

== Day 3 (16 January) ==
The Australian crowd were treated to an upset from one of their own as Casey Dellacqua sent No. 15 seed Patty Schnyder crashing out in the women's draw, while No. 13 Tatiana Golovin and No. 19 Sybille Bammer also struggled, losing to Aravane Rezaï and Hsieh Su-wei respectively. Maria Sharapova defeated comeback queen Lindsay Davenport in somewhat easy fashion 6–1, 6–3, and Justine Henin, Serena Williams, and Jelena Janković also advanced with wins. Joining them were numerous lower seeds including Elena Dementieva, Nicole Vaidišová and Amélie Mauresmo. In the men's draw, Mardy Fish dominated No. 11 seed Tommy Robredo to send him crashing out 6–1, 6–2, 6–3, while Stanislas Wawrinka retired against Marc Gicquel down two sets to one. Rafael Nadal, Nikolay Davydenko, Andy Roddick and Richard Gasquet all progressed in straight sets, whilst Mikhail Youzhny was tested before eventually winning 4–6, 7–5, 6–3, 7–6. The doubles competition also began on Day 3.

- Seeded players out: Tatiana Golovin, Patty Schnyder, Sybille Bammer; Tommy Robredo, Stanislas Wawrinka
- Doubles seeds out: Maria Elena Camerin / Gisela Dulko

Matches on main courts
Matches on Rod Laver Arena
Event	Winner	Loser	Score
Women's singles 2nd round	(Belgium) Justine Henin [1]	(Russia) Olga Puchkova	6–1, 7–5
Men's singles 2nd round	(Spain) Rafael Nadal [2]	(France) Florent Serra	6–0, 6–2, 6–2
Women's singles 2nd round	(Czech Republic) Nicole Vaidišová [12]	(Australia) Alicia Molik	6–2, 6–3
Women's singles 2nd round	(Russia) Maria Sharapova [5]	(United States) Lindsay Davenport [PR]	6–1, 6–3
Men's singles 2nd round	(United States) Andy Roddick [6]	(Germany) Michael Berrer	6–2, 6–2, 6–4
Matches on Hisense Arena
Event	Winner	Loser	Score
Women's singles 2nd round	(Australia) Casey Dellacqua	(Switzerland) Patty Schnyder [15]	4–6, 7–5, 8–6
Men's singles 2nd round	(United States) Mardy Fish	(Spain) Tommy Robredo [11]	6–1, 6–2, 6–3
Women's singles 2nd round	(United States) Serena Williams [7]	(China) Yuan Meng	6–3, 6–1
Men's singles 2nd round	(Russia) Nikolay Davydenko [4]	(France) Nicolas Mahut	6–4, 6–0, 6–3
Matches on Margaret Court Arena
Event	Winner	Loser	Score
Men's singles 2nd round	(France) Jo-Wilfried Tsonga	(United States) Sam Warburg [Q]	6–4, 7–6^{(7–4)}, 6–2
Women's singles 2nd round	(France) Amélie Mauresmo [18]	(Russia) Yaroslava Shvedova	6–4, 7–6^{(7–5)}
Women's singles 2nd round	(Serbia) Jelena Janković	(Romania) Edina Gallovits	6–2, 7–5
Women's singles 2nd round	(Israel) Shahar Pe'er [17]	(Australia) Jessica Moore [WC]	6–0, 7–5
Men's singles 2nd round	(France) Richard Gasquet [8]	(Spain) Feliciano López	6–2, 6–1, 6–3
Colored background means night matches

== Day 4 (17 January) ==
In the pick of the second round matches, former finalist Marcos Baghdatis dispatched former champion Marat Safin in five sets; 6–4, 6–4, 2–6, 3–6, 6–2. Seeds Roger Federer, Novak Djokovic, Fernando González, David Nalbandian, Tomáš Berdych and James Blake all came through unscathed; with Federer dropping only 3 games against Fabrice Santoro. Nineteenth seed and home favorite Lleyton Hewitt came through in typically gritty fashion, defeating Denis Istomin 7–6, 6–3, 5–7, 6–1. On the women's side, Ana Ivanovic defeated Tathiana Garbin 6–0, 6–3 in the night match preceding Baghdatis vs. Safin. Svetlana Kuznetsova, Anna Chakvetadze, Venus Williams, Daniela Hantuchová, Nadia Petrova and form player Li Na all navigated their way into the third round too.

- Seeded players out: Alona Bondarenko; Fernando Verdasco, Dmitry Tursunov
- Doubles seeds out: Nathalie Dechy / Dinara Safina, Lisa Raymond / Francesca Schiavone, Maria Kirilenko / Ágnes Szávay, Vania King / Nicole Pratt; Max Mirnyi / Jamie Murray, Simon Aspelin / Julian Knowle, Marcelo Melo / André Sá

Matches on main courts
Matches on Rod Laver Arena
Event	Winner	Loser	Score
Women's singles 2nd round	(Russia) Svetlana Kuznetsova [2]	(Bulgaria) Tsvetana Pironkova	7–6^{(7–0)}, 6–2
Men's singles 2nd round	(Switzerland) Roger Federer [1]	(France) Fabrice Santoro	6–1, 6–2, 6–0
Men's singles 2nd round	(Australia) Lleyton Hewitt [19]	(Uzbekistan) Denis Istomin [WC]	7–6^{(7–5)}, 6–3, 7–5, 6–1
Women's singles 2nd round	(Serbia) Ana Ivanovic [4]	(Italy) Tathiana Garbin	6–0, 6–3
Men's singles 2nd round	(Cyprus) Marcos Baghdatis [15]	(Russia) Marat Safin	6–4, 6–4, 2–6, 3–6, 6–2
Matches on Hisense Arena
Event	Winner	Loser	Score
Women's singles 2nd round	(United States) Venus Williams [8]	(France) Camille Pin	7–5, 6–4
Women's singles 2nd round	(Slovakia) Daniela Hantuchová [9]	(France) Alizé Cornet	6–2, 7–5
Men's singles 2nd round	(Serbia) Novak Djokovic [3]	(Italy) Simone Bolelli	6–1, 6–2, 6–2
Men's singles 2nd round	(Argentina) David Nalbandian [10]	(Australia) Peter Luczak	4–6, 7–5, 6–4, 6–1
Matches on Margaret Court Arena
Event	Winner	Loser	Score
Men's singles 2nd round	(Spain) Juan Carlos Ferrero [22]	(Australia) Alun Jones [WC]	6–4, 6–4, 6–2
Women's singles 2nd round	(Russia) Anna Chakvetadze [6]	(Russia) Alisa Kleybanova [Q]	6–3, 6–4
Men's singles 2nd round	(Spain) David Ferrer [5]	(Argentina) Juan Martín del Potro	6–3, 6–4, ret.
Men's singles 2nd round	(United States) James Blake [12]	(United States) Michael Russell	6–3, 6–2, 6–2
Colored background means night matches

The total attendance figure for Day 4 was 62,885, setting a new world record for a combined day/night attendance at a Grand Slam event. The previous record was 61,083, set during the 2007 US Open.

== Day 5 (18 January) ==
The first match of the night session on the Rod Laver Arena saw local player Casey Dellacqua, who had previously never progressed beyond the first round at the Australian Open, defeat former champion Amélie Mauresmo 3–6, 6–4, 6–4. Justine Henin struggled to get to grips with Francesca Schiavone before winning; and Nicole Vaidišová and Serena Williams set up an intriguing fourth round match, a re-match of the previous year's semi-final.

In the last match of the day, Philipp Kohlschreiber, the 29th seed of Germany, defeated the 6th seeded Andy Roddick in 232 minutes: 6–4, 3–6, 7–6, 6–7, 8–6; with the match reaching its conclusion past 02:00. Roddick was visibly perturbed during the match, which resulted in his earliest exit at the Australian Open since 2002. During the match, Roddick called umpire Emmanuel Joseph an "idiot" and received a retrospective fine of $500 for racquet abuse. Kohlschreiber entered the tournament in good form, having won the 2008 Heineken Open. Rafael Nadal faced world number 33 Gilles Simon, and had to save six set points in the first set. Simon squandered the first three to unforced errors, but it was Nadal who produced two aces and a drop shot to save himself at 4–5, 0-40. Paul-Henri Mathieu, under the stewardship of Mats Wilander, progressed after surviving a five-set thriller versus Stefan Koubek. Nikolay Davydenko, Richard Gasquet, Mikhail Youzhny, Jarkko Nieminen and Jo-Wilfried Tsonga also advanced.

- Seeded players out: Shahar Pe'er, Amélie Mauresmo, Francesca Schiavone, Victoria Azarenka, Virginie Razzano; Andy Roddick, Ivo Karlović, Gilles Simon, Igor Andreev
- Doubles seeds out: Katarina Srebotnik / Ai Sugiyama

Matches on main courts
Matches on Rod Laver Arena
Event	Winner	Loser	Score
Women's singles 3rd round	(Belgium) Justine Henin [1]	(Italy) Francesca Schiavone [25]	7–5, 6–4
Women's singles 3rd round	(Serbia) Jelena Janković [3]	(France) Virginie Razzano [30]	6–2, 4–6, 6–1
Men's singles 3rd round	(Spain) Rafael Nadal [2]	(France) Gilles Simon [28]	7–5, 6–2, 6–3
Women's singles 3rd round	(Australia) Casey Dellacqua	(France) Amélie Mauresmo [18]	6–3, 4–6, 4–6
Men's singles 3rd round	(Germany) Philipp Kohlschreiber [29]	(United States) Andy Roddick [6]	6–4, 3–6, 7–6^{(11–9)}, 6–7^{(3–7)}, 8–6
Matches on Hisense Arena
Event	Winner	Loser	Score
Men's singles 3rd round	(Russia) Nikolay Davydenko [4]	(France) Marc Gicquel	6–3, 6–2, 6–3
Women's singles 3rd round	(United States) Serena Williams [8]	(Belarus) Victoria Azarenka [26]	6–3, 6–4
Women's singles 3rd round	(Russia) Maria Sharapova [5]	(Russia) Elena Vesnina	6–3, 6–0
Men's singles 3rd round	(France) Richard Gasquet [8]	(Russia) Igor Andreev [31]	6–3, 6–2, 4–6, 6–4
Matches on Margaret Court Arena
Event	Winner	Loser	Score
Women's singles 3rd round	(Czech Republic) Nicole Vaidišová [12]	(Japan) Ai Sugiyama	6–3, 6–4
Men's singles 3rd round	(France) Jo-Wilfried Tsonga	(Spain) Guillermo García López	6–3, 6–4, 6–2
Women's singles 3rd round	(Russia) Elena Dementieva [11]	(Israel) Shahar Pe'er [17]	6–2, 6–0
Mixed doubles 1st round	(France) Nathalie Dechy [8] (Israel) Andy Ram [8]	(Australia) Sophie Ferguson (Australia) Adam Feeney	6–3, 6–4
Men's singles 3rd round	(Finland) Jarkko Nieminen [24]	(United States) Mardy Fish	3–6, 7–6^{(7–4)}, 6–3, 6–1
Colored background means night matches

== Day 6 (19 January) ==
Day 6 in Melbourne was plagued by rain and consequently matches could only take place on the indoor courts. In the women's competition, Ana Ivanovic made light work of Katarina Srebotnik whilst Venus Williams was more sternly tested by Sania Mirza. However, Svetlana Kuznetsova and Anna Chakvetadze both saw their tournaments ended in the third round by Agnieszka Radwańska and Maria Kirilenko respectively.

The men's competition featured two prolonged five-set matches. In the first, No. 1 seed Roger Federer was pushed to the limit by Janko Tipsarević before triumphing; 6–7, 7–6, 5–7, 6–1, 10–8 in 267 minutes. The second featured Australian hopeful Lleyton Hewitt, who defeated Marcos Baghdatis 4–6, 7–5, 7–5, 6–7, 6–3 in a match that provoked discussion about the validity of night matches; the players did not finish play until 04:34 am the next day, 282 minutes since it started at 11:52 pm. Significantly, the match extended further into the evening than any other in the history of the Australian Open. The Federer-Tipsarević match, which lasted 267 minutes, overlapped into the night session which it normally starts at 7:30 pm and this delayed the commencement of the women's singles match between Venus Williams and Sania Mirza until 10:00 pm. Rules had previously been put in place so that a men's singles match would not start if other matches had played past 11:00 pm; however, with the home crowd growing anxious, the organizers decided to go ahead with the Hewitt vs. Baghdatis match.

In other matches, the 2007 finalist Fernando González made an early exit to Marin Čilić; Novak Djokovic, James Blake and Tomáš Berdych all progressed as well.

- Seeded players out: Svetlana Kuznetsova, Anna Chakvetadze, Katarina Srebotnik, Sania Mirza; Fernando González, Marcos Baghdatis, Juan Mónaco
- Schedule of Play

Matches on main courts
Matches on Rod Laver Arena
Event	Winner	Loser	Score
Women's singles 3rd round	(Russia) Maria Kirilenko [27]	(Russia) Anna Chakvetadze [6]	6–7^{(6–8)}, 6–1, 6–2
Men's singles 3rd round	(Croatia) Marin Čilić	(Chile) Fernando González [7]	6–2, 6–7^{(4–7)}, 6–3, 6–1
Men's singles 3rd round	(Switzerland) Roger Federer [1]	(Serbia) Janko Tipsarević	6–7^{(5–7)}, 7–6^{(7–1)}, 5–7, 6–1, 10–8
Women's singles 3rd round	(United States) Venus Williams [8]	(India) Sania Mirza [31]	7–6^{(7–0)}, 6–4
Men's singles 3rd round	(Australia) Lleyton Hewitt [19]	(Cyprus) Marcos Baghdatis [15]	4–6, 7–5, 7–5, 6–7^{(4–7)}, 6–3
Matches on Vodafone Arena
Event	Winner	Loser	Score
Women's singles 3rd round	(Poland) Agnieszka Radwańska [29]	(Russia) Svetlana Kuznetsova [2]	6–3, 6–4
Men's singles 3rd round	(United States) James Blake [12]	(France) Sébastien Grosjean	4–6, 2–6, 6–0, 7–6^{(7–5)}, 6–2
Women's singles 3rd round	(Serbia) Ana Ivanovic [4]	(Slovenia) Katarina Srebotnik [28]	6–3, 6–4
Men's singles 3rd round	(Serbia) Novak Djokovic [3]	(United States) Sam Querrey	6–3, 6–1, 6–3
Matches on Margaret Court Arena
Event	Winner	Loser	Score
Men's singles 3rd round	(Czech Republic) Tomáš Berdych [13]	(Argentina) Juan Mónaco [21]	3–6, 6–3, 7–6^{(7–5)}, 6–2
Women's singles 3rd round	(Spain) Virginia Ruano Pascual vs. (Slovakia) Daniela Hantuchová [9]		Cancelled
Mixed doubles 1st round	(Australia) Jessica Moore [WC] / (Australia) Greg Jones [WC] vs (Australia) Rennae Stubbs / (Australia) Todd Perry		Cancelled
Women's doubles 2nd round	(United States) Lindsay Davenport / (Slovakia) Daniela Hantuchová vs (Czech Republic) Gabriela Navrátilová / (Czech Republic) Klára Zakopalová		Cancelled
Men's singles 3rd round	(Argentina) David Nalbandian [10] vs. (Spain) Juan Carlos Ferrero [22]		Cancelled
Colored background means night matches

== Day 7 (20 January) ==
Nikolay Davydenko became the highest-seeded male player out so far, losing to fellow Russian Mikhail Youzhny, setting up a quarter-final tie with Jo-Wilfried Tsonga, who dumped out No.8-seeded compatriot Richard Gasquet 6–2, 6–7, 7–6, 6–3 in just over three hours. Jarkko Nieminen also advanced to the last eight. Maria Sharapova easily beat Elena Dementieva and she joined Justine Henin, Serena Williams and Jelena Janković, who eliminated home favourite Casey Dellacqua, in the quarter-finals. Li Na said goodbye to the tournament, losing to qualifier Marta Domachowska. Rafael Nadal advanced to the quarter-finals as opponent Paul-Henri Mathieu retired with an injured left calf muscle; the second-ranked Spaniard was ahead 6–4, 3–0. David Nalbandian, the number 10 seed also suffered a straight-sets defeat at the hands of former world number one Juan Carlos Ferrero.

- Seeded players out: Elena Dementieva, Nicole Vaidišová, Li Na; Nikolay Davydenko, Richard Gasquet, David Nalbandian, Paul-Henri Mathieu, Philipp Kohlschreiber
- Doubles seeds out: Paul Hanley / Leander Paes, Julien Benneteau / Nicolas Mahut, Leoš Friedl / David Škoch, Christopher Kas / Rogier Wassen, František Čermák / Lukáš Dlouhý, Eric Butorac / Kevin Ullyett; Peng Shuai / Sun Tiantian; Zheng Jie / Daniel Nestor

Matches on main courts
Matches on Rod Laver Arena
Event	Winner	Loser	Score
Men's singles 3rd round	(Spain) Juan Carlos Ferrero [22]	(Argentina) David Nalbandian [10]	6–1, 6–2, 6–3
Men's singles 4th round	(France) Jo-Wilfried Tsonga	(France) Richard Gasquet [8]	6–2, 6–7^{(5–7)}, 7–6^{(8–6)}, 6–3
Women's singles 4th round	(United States) Serena Williams [7]	(Czech Republic) Nicole Vaidišová [12]	6–3, 6–4
Women's singles 4th round	(Serbia) Jelena Janković [3]	(Australia) Casey Dellacqua	7–6^{(7–3)}, 6–1
Men's singles 4th round	(Spain) Rafael Nadal [2]	(France) Paul-Henri Mathieu [23]	6–4, 3–0 ret.
Matches on Hisense Arena
Event	Winner	Loser	Score
Men's singles 3rd round	(Spain) David Ferrer [5]	(United States) Vincent Spadea	6–3, 6–3, 6–2
Women's singles 4th round	(Belgium) Justine Henin [1]	(Chinese Taipei) Hsieh Su-wei	6–2, 6–2
Women's singles 4th round	(Russia) Maria Sharapova [5]	(Russia) Elena Dementieva [11]	6–2, 6–0
Men's singles 4th round	(Russia) Mikhail Youzhny [14]	(Russia) Nikolay Davydenko [4]	7–6^{(7–2)}, 6–3, 6–1
Matches on Margaret Court Arena
Event	Winner	Loser	Score
Men's singles 4th round	(Finland) Jarkko Nieminen [24]	(Germany) Philipp Kohlschreiber [29]	3–6, 7–6^{(9–7)}, 7–6^{(11–9)}, 6–3
Men's doubles 2nd round	(India) Rohan Bopanna (United States) Rajeev Ram	(Australia) Paul Hanley [5] (India) Leander Paes [5]	6–3, 3–6, 7–6^{(8–6)}
Men's doubles 3rd round	(United States) Bob Bryan [1] (United States) Mike Bryan [1]	(France) Julien Benneteau [14] (France) Nicolas Mahut [14]	6–3, 6–4
Mixed doubles 1st round	(Zimbabwe) Cara Black [1] (Australia) Paul Hanley [1]	(United States) Bethanie Mattek (Australia) Jordan Kerr	7–6^{(7–5)}, 6–2
Colored background means night matches

World number 4 Jelena Janković was handed a US$2,000 fine after allegedly receiving coaching from her mother, Snežana, during her third round match with Virginie Razzano of France. The game took place on Day 3 of the event. Umpire Maria Alves spotted the infringement during the match, and although unable to understand what had been communicated, dealt Janković a code violation for illegal coaching.

Janković denied the allegation, saying that she simply shouted 'C'mon' in Serbian. The practice of coaching during a match is banned at all WTA and Grand Slam events.

Maria Sharapova was fined the same amount at the 2007 Australian Open, also for receiving illegal coaching, with the same umpire, Maria Alves, in the chair.

== Day 8 (21 January) ==
Novak Djokovic powered his way into the quarter-finals, defeating Lleyton Hewitt 7–5, 6–3, 6–3 in a fourth-round clash. Roger Federer finished Tomáš Berdych's tournament in 1 hour and 59 minutes, 6–4, 7–6, 6–3. He faces James Blake next, who scored a 6–3, 6–4, 6–4 win over 19-year-old Croat Marin Čilić; a victory which saw him advance past the fourth round here for the first time. Venus Williams fought back twice from service breaks in the first set to secure a place in the quarter-finals; with a 6–4, 6–4 win over Marta Domachowska. She next faces No. 4 seed Ana Ivanovic, who put together a 6–1, 7–6 win over Denmark's Caroline Wozniacki. No. 9 seed Daniela Hantuchová beat No. 27 Maria Kirilenko 1–6, 6–4, 6–4 and will next play Poland's Agnieszka Radwańska, who upset No. 14 Nadia Petrova 1–6, 7–5, 6–0.

- Seeded players out: Nadia Petrova, Maria Kirilenko; Tomáš Berdych, Lleyton Hewitt, Juan Carlos Ferrero
- Doubles seeds out: Sania Mirza / Alicia Molik, Iveta Benešová / Galina Voskoboeva, Chan Yung-jan / Chuang Chia-jung; Mariusz Fyrstenberg / Marcin Matkowski

Matches on main courts
Matches on Rod Laver Arena
Event	Winner	Loser	Score
Women's singles 4th round	(Serbia) Ana Ivanovic [4]	(Denmark) Caroline Wozniacki	6–1, 7–6^{(7–2)}
Women's singles 4th round	(United States) Venus Williams [8]	(Poland) Marta Domachowska [Q]	6–4, 6–4
Men's singles 4th round	(Switzerland) Roger Federer [1]	(Czech Republic) Tomáš Berdych [13]	6–4, 7–6^{(9-7)}, 6–3
Men's singles 4th round	(Serbia) Novak Djokovic [3]	(Australia) Lleyton Hewitt [19]	7–5, 6–3, 6–3
Women's doubles 3rd round	(Belarus) Victoria Azarenka [12] (Israel) Shahar Pe'er [12]	(India) Sania Mirza [6] (Australia) Alicia Molik [6]	7–5, 6–3
Matches on Hisense Arena
Event	Winner	Loser	Score
Men's doubles 3rd round	(South Africa) Jeff Coetzee (South Africa) Wesley Moodie	(India) Rohan Bopanna (United States) Rajeev Ram	3–6, 6–4, 6–3
Women's singles 4th round	(Slovakia) Daniela Hantuchová [9]	(Russia) Maria Kirilenko [27]	1–6, 6–4, 6–4
Women's doubles 2nd round	(Serbia) Jelena Janković (United States) Bethanie Mattek	(Belarus) Olga Govortsova (Belarus) Darya Kustova	6–4, 6–3
Men's singles 4th round	(Spain) David Ferrer [5]	(Spain) Juan Carlos Ferrero [22]	7–5, 3–6, 6–4, 6–1
Matches on Margaret Court Arena
Event	Winner	Loser	Score
Legends doubles 1st round	(Argentina) Guillermo Vilas (Australia) Paul McNamee	(Sweden) Mats Wilander (Australia) Peter McNamara	unknown
Women's singles 4th round	(Poland) Agnieszka Radwańska [29]	(Russia) Nadia Petrova [14]	1–6, 7–5, 6–0
Men's singles 4th round	(United States) James Blake [12]	(Croatia) Marin Čilić	6–3, 6–4, 6–4
Mixed doubles 2nd round	(Zimbabwe) Cara Black [1] (Australia) Paul Hanley [1]	(Australia) Jessica Moore [WC] (Australia) Greg Jones [WC]	6–1, 6–1
Colored background means night matches

== Day 9 (22 January) ==
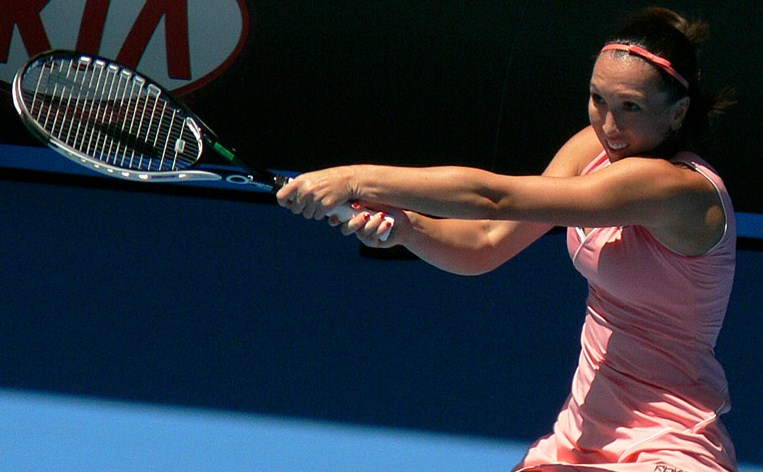
Jelena Janković in her quarter-finals match.

Jelena Janković survived a straight set win over defending champion Serena Williams, making the semifinals of her 3rd different major. Rafael Nadal won his quarter final match against Jarkko Nieminen in straight sets, putting him into his first semi-final at the Australian Open. Maria Sharapova defeated No. 1 seed Justine Henin in a repeat of the 2007 WTA Tour Championships final. On this occasion, Henin was unable to win even a set as Sharapova eased to victory; 6–4, 6–0. Jo-Wilfried Tsonga won his match against 14th seed Mikhail Youzhny and booked his spot in the semi-finals.

- Seeded players out: Justine Henin, Serena Williams; Mikhail Youzhny, Jarkko Nieminen
- Doubles seeds out: Daniel Nestor / Nenad Zimonjić, Martin Damm / Pavel Vízner; Janette Husárová / Flavia Pennetta, Cara Black / Liezel Huber; Lisa Raymond / Simon Aspelin

In a day that was relatively free of controversy on the court, several media outlets focused on allegedly unsavoury aspects off it. Sharapova's father, Yuri Sharapov, came under intense scrutiny from Australian media after he made a throat-slashing gesture shortly after his daughter's match against the world No. 1 Justine Henin. Sharapova had earlier joked that her father's camouflage hoodie made him look like "an assassin". The WTA claimed that the gesture was simply a joke between the pair, pertaining to this comment.

== Day 10 (23 January) ==
Novak Djokovic defeated David Ferrer 6–0, 6–3, 7–5 in a closely fought third set, which advanced him to his fourth consecutive Grand Slam semi-final. Ana Ivanovic progressed to her first Australian Open semi-final after defeating Venus Williams 7–6, 6–4, a result which marked Ivanovic's first triumph over either of the Williams sisters. She set up a tie with Daniela Hantuchová, who advanced to her first Grand Slam semi-final after dispatching Agnieszka Radwańska 6–2, 6–2. Roger Federer defeated James Blake 7–5, 7–6, 6–4 in just over 2 hours. Federer's progression marked his 15th consecutive Grand Slam semi-final, a record.

- Seeded players out: Venus Williams, Agnieszka Radwańska; David Ferrer, James Blake
- Doubles seeds out: Bob Bryan / Mike Bryan; Květa Peschke / Rennae Stubbs, Yan Zi / Jie Zheng

== Day 11 (24 January) ==
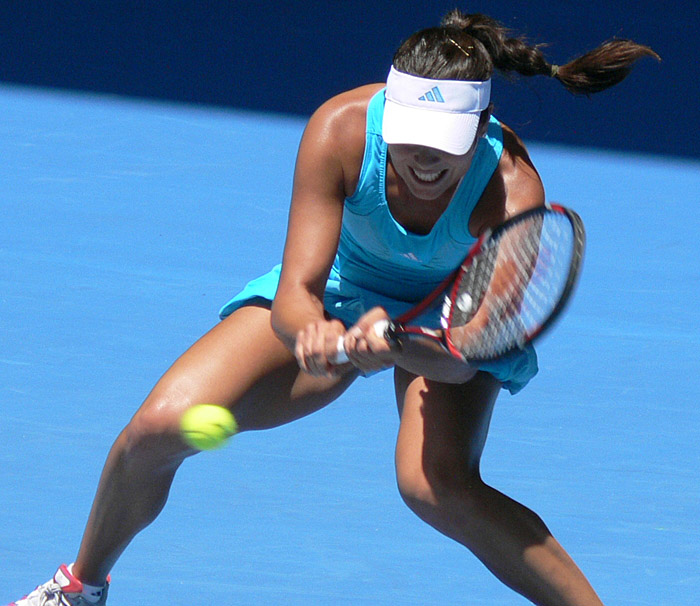
Ana Ivanovic reached her first Australian Open final.

In the first women's semi-final match, fifth seeded Russian Maria Sharapova defeated third seeded Serbian Jelena Janković in a two sets, 6–3, 6–1 to clinch the first spot in the finals. Janković later conceded that she "wanted to withdraw", but played on for the crowd's benefit. Fourth seeded Ana Ivanovic also progressed to the final after defeating Daniela Hantuchová in three sets, 0–6, 6–3, 6–4. Ivanovic had lost the first eight games of the match before rectifying her game. However, Hantuchová was critical of Ivanovic's tactics during the latter stages of the match. Hantuchová claimed that Ivanovic resorted to gamesmanship by shuffling her feet prior to her serve, thereby causing a distraction. Ivanovic said that any possible noise was a result of the new court surface; and tried to offer an explanation of Hantuchová's motives, saying, "Maybe she was just trying to pick on something, to get upset." Unseeded Frenchman Jo-Wilfried Tsonga defeated second seeded Spaniard Rafael Nadal in the first men's semifinal, in straight sets, 6–2, 6–3, 6–2 in less than 2 hours. Journalists expressed shock, not only at the victory, but at the comprehensive manner in which the nascent Tsonga won it. Tsonga hit a total of 49 winners to Nadal's 13 and served imperiously: Nadal was unable to force a break point until the third set.

- Seeded players out: Jelena Janković, Daniela Hantuchová; Rafael Nadal
- Doubles seeds out: Cara Black / Paul Hanley, Chuang Chia-jung / Jonathan Erlich; Anabel Medina Garrigues / Virginia Ruano Pascual; Mahesh Bhupathi / Mark Knowles

== Day 12 (25 January) ==
In the second men's semi-final, between No. 1 Roger Federer and No. 3 Novak Djokovic, Djokovic won in just over 2 hours; completing the victory in straight sets, 7–5, 6–3, 7–6 to reach the second grand slam final of his career. This broke Federer's record run of appearing in 10 consecutive grand slam finals. In the women's doubles final, Alyona and Kateryna Bondarenko beat Victoria Azarenka and Shahar Pe'er 2–6, 6–1, 6–4 to win their first Grand Slam title.

- Seeded player out: Roger Federer
- Doubles seeds out: Victoria Azarenka / Shahar Pe'er; Yan Zi / Mark Knowles, Nathalie Dechy / Andy Ram

== Day 13 (26 January) ==
In what was dubbed the "Glam Slam" final, Maria Sharapova of Russia won the Women's 2008 Australian Open over Ana Ivanovic of Serbia in straight sets; 7–5, 6–3. It was Sharapova's third Grand Slam title. Sharapova also achieved the feat of not dropping a set or playing a tiebreak the entire tournament, after she was heavily defeated by Serena Williams in the 2007 final. In the men's doubles final, the Israeli pair, Jonathan Erlich and Andy Ram beat Arnaud Clément and Michaël Llodra of France 7–5, 7–6 to win their first Grand Slam title.

The juniors competition also reached its conclusion on Day 13. Australian Bernard Tomic defeated Taiwanese player Yang Tsung-hua; 4–6, 7–6, 6–0 to win the boys' event. Arantxa Rus of the Netherlands defeated the other Australian hopeful, Jessica Moore, 6–3, 6–4 to claim the girls' singles crown. In the women's wheelchair event, Esther Vergeer won her third consecutive title, beating fellow Dutchwoman Korie Homan 6–4, 6–3. Shingo Kunieda won his fourth slam in a row in the men's wheelchair competition, defeating former champion Michaël Jérémiasz 6–1, 6–4.

- Seeded player out: Ana Ivanovic
- Doubles seeds out: Arnaud Clément / Michaël Llodra

== Day 14 (27 January) ==
Third seeded Novak Djokovic of Serbia defeated unseeded Jo-Wilfried Tsonga of France in four sets; 4–6, 6–4, 6–3, 7–6, becoming the first Serbian player to win a Grand-Slam singles title.

Sun Tiantian of China and Nenad Zimonjić of Serbia were crowned the 2008 Mixed Doubles champions after defeating Sania Mirza and Mahesh Bhupathi of India in straight sets; 7–6, 6–4.
