= 2008 Australian Open =

- Date: 14–27 January 2008
- Edition: 96th
- Category: Grand Slam (ITF)
- Surface: Hardcourt (Plexicushion)
- Location: Melbourne, Australia
- Venue: Melbourne Park

Champions

Men's singles
- (Serbia) Novak Djokovic

Women's singles
- (Russia) Maria Sharapova

Men's doubles
- (Israel) Jonathan Erlich / (Israel) Andy Ram

Women's doubles
- (Ukraine) Alona Bondarenko / (Ukraine) Kateryna Bondarenko

Mixed doubles
- (China) Sun Tiantian / (Serbia) Nenad Zimonjić

Wheelchair men's singles
- (Japan) Shingo Kunieda

Wheelchair women's singles
- (Netherlands) Esther Vergeer

Wheelchair quad singles
- (United Kingdom) Peter Norfolk

Wheelchair men's doubles
- (Japan) Shingo Kunieda / (Japan) Satoshi Saida

Wheelchair women's doubles
- (Netherlands) Jiske Griffioen / (Netherlands) Esther Vergeer

Wheelchair quad doubles
- (United States) Nick Taylor / (United States) David Wagner

Boys' singles
- (Australia) Bernard Tomic

Girls' singles
- (Netherlands) Arantxa Rus

Boys' doubles
- (Chinese Taipei) Hsieh Cheng-peng / (Chinese Taipei) Yang Tsung-hua

Girls' doubles
- (Russia) Ksenia Lykina / (Russia) Anastasia Pavlyuchenkova
- Australian Open

The 2008 Australian Open was a tennis tournament played on outdoor hard courts. It was the 96th edition of the Australian Open, and the first Grand Slam event of the year. It took place at the Melbourne Park in Melbourne, Australia, from 14 through 27 January 2008.

After twenty years of playing on Rebound Ace, the courts were changed to Plexicushion, a marginally faster surface. The new surface is thinner, and therefore has lower heat retention. This decision was made in a bid to reduce the "stick" of the court and the frequency of the extreme heat policy being invoked. However, the new surface faced criticism for being too similar to DecoTurf, the surface used at the US Open. Player reaction to the change of surface was generally ambivalent.

Both Roger Federer and Serena Williams were unsuccessful in defending their 2007 titles; Federer losing to Novak Djokovic in the semi-finals and Williams losing in the quarter-finals to Jelena Janković. Djokovic won his first Grand Slam singles title, defeating unseeded Jo-Wilfried Tsonga in the final; Maria Sharapova, runner-up to Williams in 2007, defeated Ana Ivanovic to win her first Australian Open title and third Grand Slam title.

For the mixed doubles, in every game, the first team to score four points, won the game. In other words, when a deuce happened in a game, the team who won the next point won the game.

== Notable stories ==
=== Surface change ===
On 30 May 2007, Australian Open tournament director Craig Tiley announced that as of the 2008 Australian Open, the Rebound Ace surface that had been used since 1988 would be replaced by a newer, faster Plexicushion surface. The Rebound Ace surface had been criticized for several years, from players including Andy Roddick and Mark Philippoussis, who claimed that the "stick" of the court was a contributing factor in many players injuring themselves. This "stick" was a result of the thick rubber mat (10 mm) laid beneath the surface, the high heat retention because of this, and the high temperatures present during the Australian summer, which intermittently resulted in the extreme heat policy being invoked. Conversely, players such as Pete Sampras and Marat Safin put the high number of injuries down to lack of preparation from players; partly due to the fact that the tournament is held so early in the year, but also because there were so few tournaments preceding it. Rebound Ace was also chastised by Lleyton Hewitt for having an inconsistent bounce, in terms of height and pace (shock absorption); and claimed that these factors varied depending on the weather. The heat retention of the surface had also been a point of contention between players.

In announcing the change, Tiley said Plexicushion would have a "lower rubber content than Rebound Ace, was firmer under foot and retained less heat through its thinner top layer." Tiley later said that the change of colour, from green to blue, would also benefit players and officials, although this change was quite arbitrary. The manufacturers of Rebound Ace derided the new surface, with director Paul Bull saying that, "We had an Australian icon event with a unique Australian product and now we are just going to become a clone of the US Open." Bull also said that the inconsistencies in pace were down to the organizers' imperative, who kept asking for the pace to be adjusted to pander for certain players, such as Hewitt. Bull, however, conceded that a change was needed; and said that the suggestion of a Rebound Ace court with a rubber mat thickness of around 5 mm was made.

The Plexicushion surface received a relatively mixed reception from players. Lleyton Hewitt, Justine Henin and Serena Williams were all keen to endorse the new courts; with Hewitt's appraisal focused on the greater consistency of the courts. Henin called it a "good surface" but said she did not find it markedly distinguishable from Rebound Ace, saying the biggest difference was the change of colour. Williams claimed that the court was not as "bouncy" and was causing less physical strain on her feet and ankles. One source of criticism from players was the slower than expected pace, although many of these comments came prior to the event's commencement. Players were exposed to the new courts through other tournaments, played in advance of the Open; and practise on the new surface. Roger Federer described it as slow, with Novak Djokovic, Jelena Janković and James Blake all corroborating this opinion, albeit from experience in preliminary tournaments. Pundit and former World No. 1 Pat Rafter said it was possible that the courts would speed up in time.

=== Implementation of anti-corruption policing ===
On 21 December 2007, organizers of the event announced that the tournament would be watched under the scrutiny of anti-corruption officials. A partnership was formed with Victoria Police. This announcement came in the wake of a series of scandals to hit the sport, including World No. 4 Nikolay Davydenko coming under suspicion of match fixing; with at least a dozen other players coming forward about having been approached to influence matches in an unethical manner. Tennis Australia chief executive Steve Wood commented that, "Match-fixing and illegal gambling are a threat to the integrity of sport. We're putting our policies, procedures and programme in place to protect it."

This was followed by a statement from the wider community of the International Tennis Federation (ITF), Association of Tennis Professionals (ATP), Women's Tennis Association (WTA) and organizers of all four Grand Slams that they would review their anti-corruption policies in the future. This announcement came six days prior to the start of the Open, on 8 January 2008.

=== Crowd trouble ===
On 15 January, Day 2 of the tournament, Victoria Police had to intervene when Greek Australian supporters, following Greece's Konstantinos Economidis in his match against Chilean Fernando González, became unruly. The match, in progress at the Margaret Court Arena, was suspended for ten minutes as the police attempted stop the "offensive chanting" and eject certain fans. Approximately forty supporters, heavily outnumbered by Chilean fans, were warned of their disorderly conduct prior to the police deploying pepper spray. The police regiment was heavily outnumbered, with a BBC Radio employee commenting that, "[there were] two guys against maybe 70-80, that's not good." Tournament officials said that 3 people had been sprayed and 5 evicted; a small proportion of the Greek fans left the arena, upset at how events were transpiring and fearing for their safety.

Both players said that the trouble was not something they had witnessed before; and Economidis condemned his supporters, saying that, "It was a really nice atmosphere until this moment. I am really unhappy." Some witnesses have implicated Cypriot and Serbian supporters in the trouble.

Australian Open director, Craig Tiley, had announced in the week preceding the event that police and security forces would "impose a 'zero-tolerance' policy on anti-social behaviour". This statement appeared to be a delayed reaction to the trouble that marred the event in 2007, with Australian youths of Greek, Serbian and Croatian origins involved in mutually abusive sparring. However, the problem was much more pronounced in 2007, with violence breaking out and around 150 fans ejected.

=== Sexual assault ===
Police were called to investigate a report that a 12-year-old girl was indecently assaulted by a drunk man at the Australian Open.

In a brief statement, Victoria Police said they received a report that the girl was inappropriately touched on the buttocks on Monday.

"The matter was reported to police this morning and the incident is currently being investigated", the statement said. This event mirrors a series of incidents that occurred at last year's event, when several men attending the tournament were arrested for taking upskirt photographs.

=== Marcos Baghdatis video controversy ===
During the Open, a video posted on YouTube almost a year earlier made headlines in the Australian media. The video shows the 2008 fifteenth seed, Cypriot Marcos Baghdatis, at a barbecue hosted by his Greek Australian fans in Melbourne in early 2007. In it, Baghdatis is holding a flare and taking part in chants against the Turkish invasion of Cyprus. Melbourne's Turkish Cypriot community called for Baghdatis to be expelled from Australia, but in a statement issued through his manager, the Cypriot player said he was "supporting the interest of my country, Cyprus, while protesting against a situation that is not recognized by the United Nations".

=== Serbian performance ===
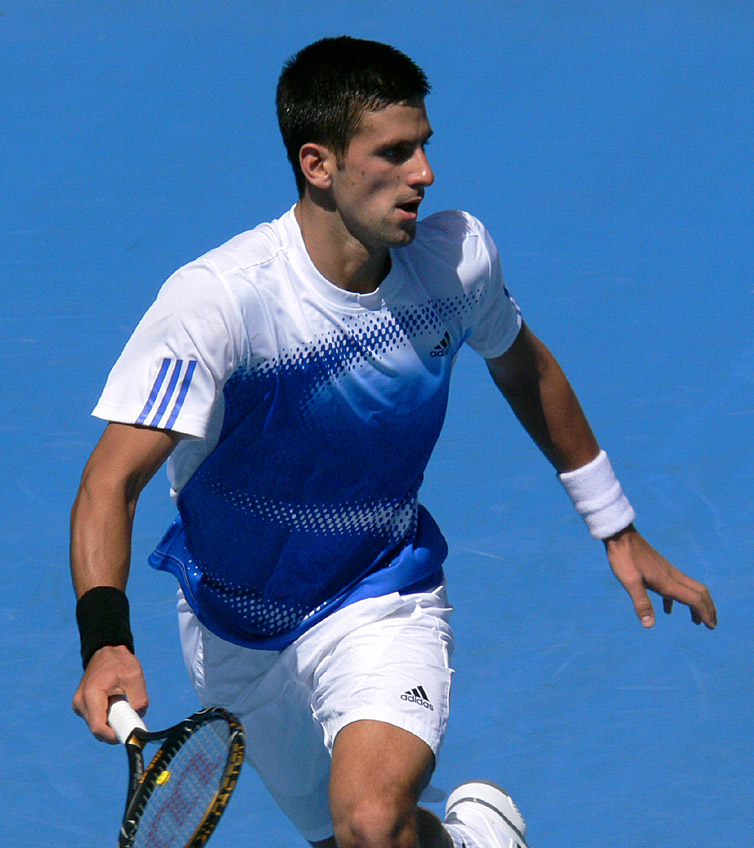
Novak Djokovic became the first Serbian man to win a Grand Slam title.

This tournament saw strong performances from Serbian players. The men's side saw Janko Tipsarević, winner of the boys' tournament in 2001, almost cause an upset when he pushed Roger Federer to five sets in the third round, with the final score being 6–7 (5–7), 7–6 (7–1), 5–7, 6–1, 10–8 in Federer's favour. The match, which overlapped into the night session due to rain earlier in the day, took almost four-and-a-half hours to complete. Third-seed Novak Djokovic became Serbia's first Grand Slam singles title winner (Ana Ivanovic would later become that country's first Grand Slam women's singles title winner, at the 2008 French Open), and the youngest ever winner of the Australian Open, at 20 years and 250 days of age, when he defeated surprise finalist Jo-Wilfried Tsonga in the final, having defeated the defending champion Federer in the semi-finals, and Australian hopeful Lleyton Hewitt in straight sets in the fourth round. Coincidentally, Djokovic would also defeat Federer in straight sets en route to his second Australian Open title, in 2011.

The women's draw saw Jelena Janković, the 2001 girls' champion, and Ana Ivanovic produce notable performances to reach the semi-finals and the final, respectively. Janković saved three match points against Tamira Paszek in the first round, before defeating rising Australian player Casey Dellacqua in the fourth round. Janković then ended the title defence of Serena Williams in the quarter-finals, before losing her semi-final to Maria Sharapova. Twenty-four hours after Janković's victory over Serena Williams, Ana Ivanovic recorded her first career victory against Venus Williams in her quarter-final, and went on to reach her second Grand Slam final by defeating Daniela Hantuchová in the semi-finals, having to recover from a 0–6, 0–2 deficit to do so. Ivanovic was then defeated in the final by Maria Sharapova, in a match dubbed as the "Glam Slam" final.

== Seniors ==
=== Men's singles ===
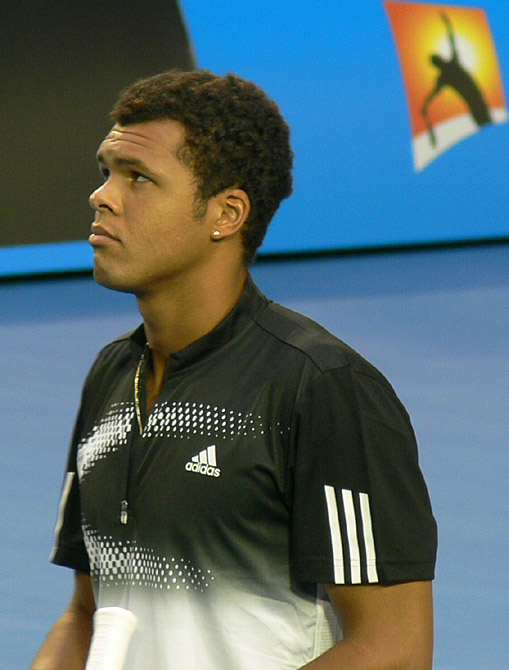
Tsonga stunned the tennis world by reaching the final.

(Serbia) Novak Djokovic defeated (France) Jo-Wilfried Tsonga, 4–6, 6–4, 6–3, 7–6^{(7–2)}

- It was Djokovic's 1st title of the year, and his 8th overall. It was his 1st career Grand Slam title.

=== Women's singles ===
(Russia) Maria Sharapova defeated (Serbia) Ana Ivanovic, 7–5, 6–3

=== Men's doubles ===
(Israel) Jonathan Erlich / (Israel) Andy Ram defeated (France) Arnaud Clément / (France) Michaël Llodra, 7–5, 7–6^{(7–4)}

- The duo's first Grand Slam win after numerous ATP titles
- The first ever Grand Slam trophy in Men's Doubles for Israeli players.

=== Women's doubles ===
(Ukraine) Alona Bondarenko / (Ukraine) Kateryna Bondarenko defeated (Belarus) Victoria Azarenka / (Israel) Shahar Pe'er, 2–6, 6–1, 6–4

- It was Alona and Kateryna's 1st career Grand Slam doubles title.

=== Mixed doubles ===
(China) Sun Tiantian / (Serbia) Nenad Zimonjić defeated (India) Sania Mirza / (India) Mahesh Bhupathi, 7–6^{(7–4)}, 6–4

- It was Sun's 1st career Grand Slam mixed doubles title.
- It was Zimonjić's 3rd career Grand Slam mixed doubles title and his 2nd at the Australian Open.

== Juniors ==
=== Boys' singles ===
(Australia) Bernard Tomic def (Chinese Taipei) Yang Tsung-hua, 4–6, 7–6(5), 6–0

=== Girls' singles ===
(Netherlands) Arantxa Rus defeated (Australia) Jessica Moore, 6–3, 6–4

=== Boys' doubles ===
(Chinese Taipei) Hsieh Cheng-peng / (Chinese Taipei) Yang Tsung-hua defeated (Canada) Vasek Pospisil / (Mexico) César Ramírez, 3–6, 7–5, [10]–[5]

=== Girls' doubles ===
(Russia) Ksenia Lykina / (Russia) Anastasia Pavlyuchenkova defeated (Romania) Elena Bogdan / (Japan) Misaki Doi, 6–0, 6–4

== Wheelchair ==
=== Wheelchair men's singles ===
(Japan) Shingo Kunieda defeated (France) Michaël Jérémiasz, 6–1, 6–4

=== Wheelchair women's singles ===
(Netherlands) Esther Vergeer defeated (Netherlands) Korie Homan, 6–3, 6–3

=== Wheelchair men's doubles ===
(Japan) Shingo Kunieda / (Japan) Satoshi Saida defeated (Netherlands) Robin Ammerlaan / (Netherlands) Ronald Vink, 6–4, 6–3

=== Wheelchair women's doubles ===
(Netherlands) Jiske Griffioen / (Netherlands) Esther Vergeer defeated (Netherlands) Korie Homan / (Netherlands) Sharon Walraven, 6–3, 6–1

=== Wheelchair quad singles ===
(United Kingdom) Peter Norfolk defeated (United States) David Wagner, 6–2, 6–3

=== Wheelchair quad doubles ===
(United States) Nicholas Taylor / (United States) David Wagner defeated (Canada) Sarah Hunter / (United Kingdom) Peter Norfolk, 5–7, 6–0, [10]–[3]

== Seeds ==
These were the seeds for the 2008 Australian Open.

On the women's side of the draw, all of the world's top thirty-two players were present; whereas in the men's draw Tommy Haas and Guillermo Cañas were both forced to withdraw due to injury. On the date that the seeds were announced, 11 January 2008, Haas was No. 12 in the world and Cañas No. 17.

=== Men's singles ===
1. (Switzerland) Roger Federer, (semifinals, lost to Novak Djokovic)
2. (Spain) Rafael Nadal, (semifinals, lost to Jo-Wilfried Tsonga)
3. (Serbia) Novak Djokovic, (champion)
4. (Russia) Nikolay Davydenko, (4th Round, lost to Mikhail Youzhny)
5. (Spain) David Ferrer, (quarterfinals, lost to Novak Djokovic)
6. (United States) Andy Roddick, (3rd Round, lost to Philipp Kohlschreiber)
7. (Chile) Fernando González, (3rd Round, lost to Marin Čilić)
8. (France) Richard Gasquet, (4th Round, lost to Jo-Wilfried Tsonga)
9. (United Kingdom) Andy Murray, (1st Round, lost to Jo-Wilfried Tsonga)
10. (Argentina) David Nalbandian, (3rd Round, lost to Juan Carlos Ferrero)
11. (Spain) Tommy Robredo, (2nd Round, lost to Mardy Fish)
12. (United States) James Blake, (quarterfinals, lost to Roger Federer)
13. (Czech Republic) Tomáš Berdych, (4th Round, lost to Roger Federer)
14. (Russia) Mikhail Youzhny, (quarterfinals, lost to Jo-Wilfried Tsonga)
15. (Cyprus) Marcos Baghdatis, (3rd Round, lost to Lleyton Hewitt)
16. (Spain) Carlos Moyá, (1st Round, lost to Stefan Koubek)
17. (Croatia) Ivan Ljubičić, (1st Round, lost to Robin Haase)
18. (Argentina) Juan Ignacio Chela, (1st Round, lost to Guillermo García López)
19. (Australia) Lleyton Hewitt, (4th Round, lost to Novak Djokovic)
20. (Croatia) Ivo Karlović, (3rd Round, lost to Mikhail Youzhny)
21. (Argentina) Juan Mónaco, (3rd Round, lost to Tomáš Berdych)
22. (Spain) Juan Carlos Ferrero, (4th Round, lost to David Ferrer)
23. (France) Paul-Henri Mathieu, (4th Round, lost to Rafael Nadal)
24. (Finland) Jarkko Nieminen, (quarterfinals, lost to Rafael Nadal)
25. (Spain) Fernando Verdasco, (2nd Round, lost to Janko Tipsarević)
26. (Switzerland) Stanislas Wawrinka, (2nd Round, lost to Marc Gicquel)
27. (Spain) Nicolás Almagro, (1st Round, lost to Marin Čilić)
28. (France) Gilles Simon, (3rd Round, lost to Rafael Nadal)
29. (Germany) Philipp Kohlschreiber, (4th Round, lost to Jarkko Nieminen)
30. (Czech Republic) Radek Štěpánek, (1st Round, lost to Vincent Spadea)
31. (Russia) Igor Andreev, (3rd Round, lost to Richard Gasquet)
32. (Russia) Dmitry Tursunov, (2nd Round, lost to Sam Querrey)

=== Women's singles ===
1. (Belgium) Justine Henin, (quarterfinals, lost to Maria Sharapova)
2. (Russia) Svetlana Kuznetsova, (3rd Round, lost to Agnieszka Radwańska)
3. (Serbia) Jelena Janković, (semifinals, lost to Maria Sharapova)
4. (Serbia) Ana Ivanovic, (final, lost to Maria Sharapova)
5. (Russia) Maria Sharapova, (champion)
6. (Russia) Anna Chakvetadze, (3rd Round, lost to Maria Kirilenko)
7. (United States) Serena Williams, (quarterfinals, lost to Jelena Janković)
8. (United States) Venus Williams, (quarterfinals, lost to Ana Ivanovic)
9. (Slovakia) Daniela Hantuchová, (semifinals, lost to Ana Ivanovic)
10. (France) Marion Bartoli, (1st Round, lost to Sofia Arvidsson)
11. (Russia) Elena Dementieva, (4th Round, lost to Maria Sharapova)
12. (Czech Republic) Nicole Vaidišová, (4th Round, lost to Serena Williams)
13. (France) Tatiana Golovin, (2nd Round, lost to Aravane Rezaï)
14. (Russia) Nadia Petrova, (4th Round, lost to Agnieszka Radwańska)
15. (Switzerland) Patty Schnyder, (2nd Round, lost to Casey Dellacqua)
16. (Russia) Dinara Safina, (1st Round, lost to Sabine Lisicki)
17. (Israel) Shahar Pe'er, (3rd Round, lost to Elena Dementieva)
18. (France) Amélie Mauresmo, (3rd Round, lost to Casey Dellacqua)
19. (Austria) Sybille Bammer, (2nd Round, lost to Hsieh Su-wei)
20. (Hungary) Ágnes Szávay, (1st Round, lost to Ekaterina Makarova)
21. (Ukraine) Alona Bondarenko, (2nd Round, lost to Caroline Wozniacki)
22. (Czech Republic) Lucie Šafářová, (1st Round, lost to Catalina Castaño)
23. (Russia) Vera Zvonareva, (1st Round, retired due to injury)
24. (China) Li Na, (3rd Round, lost to Marta Domachowska)
25. (Italy) Francesca Schiavone, (3rd Round, lost to Justine Henin)
26. (Belarus) Victoria Azarenka, (3rd Round, lost to Serena Williams)
27. (Russia) Maria Kirilenko, (4th Round, lost to Daniela Hantuchová)
28. (Slovenia) Katarina Srebotnik, (3rd Round, lost to Ana Ivanovic)
29. (Poland) Agnieszka Radwańska, (quarterfinals, lost to Daniela Hantuchová)
30. (France) Virginie Razzano, (3rd Round, lost to Jelena Janković)
31. (India) Sania Mirza, (3rd Round, lost to Venus Williams)
32. (Ukraine) Julia Vakulenko, (1st Round, lost to Elena Vesnina)

== Main draw wildcard entries ==
=== Men's singles ===
- (Uzbekistan) Denis Istomin
- (Australia) Alun Jones
- (Australia) Brydan Klein
- (United States) Jesse Levine
- (Australia) Nick Lindahl
- (France) Mathieu Montcourt
- (Australia) Joseph Sirianni
- (Australia) Robert Smeets

=== Women's singles ===
- (Australia) Monique Adamczak
- (United States) Madison Brengle
- (Australia) Sophie Ferguson
- (Slovakia) Jarmila Gajdošová
- (France) Mathilde Johansson
- (Australia) Jessica Moore
- (Uzbekistan) Iroda Tulyaganova
- (Australia) Christina Wheeler

=== Men's doubles ===
- (Australia) Carsten Ball / (Australia) Adam Feeney
- (Australia) Andrew Coelho / (Australia) Brydan Klein
- (Australia) Colin Ebelthite / (Australia) Nick Lindahl
- (Australia) Samuel Groth / (Australia) Joseph Sirianni
- (Australia) Chris Guccione / (Australia) Peter Luczak
- (Australia) Nathan Healey / (Australia) Robert Smeets
- (Australia) Alun Jones / (Australia) Greg Jones

=== Women's doubles ===
- (Australia) Monique Adamczak / (Australia) Christina Wheeler
- (Australia) Alison Bai / (Australia) Nicole Kriz
- (Australia) Tyra Calderwood / (Australia) Alenka Hubacek
- (Australia) Casey Dellacqua / (Australia) Jessica Moore
- (Australia) Daniella Dominikovic / (Australia) Emily Hewson
- (Australia) Sophie Ferguson / (Australia) Trudi Musgrave
- (Australia) Marija Mirkovic / (Australia) Karolina Wlodarczak

=== Mixed doubles ===
- (Australia) Monique Adamczak / (Australia) Stephen Huss
- (Australia) Sophie Ferguson / (Australia) Adam Feeney
- (Slovakia) Jarmila Gajdošová / (Australia) Samuel Groth
- (Australia) Isabella Holland / (Australia) Brydan Klein
- (Australia) Alicia Molik / (Australia) Nathan Healey
- (Australia) Jessica Moore / (Australia) Greg Jones

== Qualifier entries ==
=== Men's qualifiers entries ===
1. (Netherlands) Robin Haase
2. (Czech Republic) Lukáš Dlouhý
3. (Croatia) Roko Karanušić
4. (South Africa) Kevin Anderson
5. (United States) Amer Delić
6. (United States) Sam Warburg
7. (Germany) Denis Gremelmayr
8. (Slovakia) Lukáš Lacko
9. (United Kingdom) Jamie Baker
10. (Israel) Harel Levy
11. (United States) Wayne Odesnik
12. (Austria) Martin Slanar
13. (Serbia) Viktor Troicki
14. (Spain) Marcel Granollers
15. (United States) Rajeev Ram
16. (Greece) Konstantinos Economidis

=== Women's qualifiers entries ===
1. (Romania) Monica Niculescu
2. (Germany) Angelika Bachmann
3. (Russia) Ekaterina Ivanova
4. (Germany) Julia Schruff
5. (Russia) Alisa Kleybanova
6. (Thailand) Tamarine Tanasugarn
7. (Chinese Taipei) Hsieh Su-wei
8. (Poland) Marta Domachowska
9. (Switzerland) Timea Bacsinszky
10. (Germany) Sandra Klösel
11. (China) Yuan Meng
12. (Germany) Sabine Lisicki

== Withdrawals ==
Men's Singles

- (Croatia) Mario Ančić → replaced by (United States) Bobby Reynolds
- (Sweden) Jonas Björkman → replaced by (France) Olivier Patience
- (Argentina) Guillermo Cañas → replaced by (Argentina) Mariano Zabaleta
- (Germany) Tommy Haas → replaced by (Chinese Taipei) Lu Yen-hsun
- (France) Gaël Monfils → replaced by (Argentina) Juan Pablo Brzezicki
- (Sweden) Robin Söderling → replaced by (United States) John Isner
- (Italy) Potito Starace → replaced by (United States) Robert Kendrick

Women's Singles

- (Russia) Vera Dushevina → replaced by (Romania) Sorana Cîrstea
- (Russia) Elena Likhovtseva → replaced by (Colombia) Catalina Castaño
- (Italy) Mara Santangelo → replaced by (Russia) Ekaterina Makarova
- (Venezuela) Milagros Sequera → replaced by (Argentina) Clarisa Fernández
- (United States) Meghann Shaughnessy → replaced by (France) Stéphanie Cohen-Aloro
- (Australia) Samantha Stosur → replaced by (United States) Vania King

Preceded by 2007 US Open	Grand Slams	Succeeded by 2008 French Open
