= 2008 Australian Open – Women's doubles =

Women's doubles
- 2008 Australian Open

Final
- Champion: (Ukraine) Alona Bondarenko (Ukraine) Kateryna Bondarenko
- Runner-up: (Belarus) Victoria Azarenka (Israel) Shahar Pe'er
- Score: 2–6, 6–1, 6–4

Details
- Draw: 64
- Seeds: 16

Events
Singles	men	women		boys	girls
Doubles	men	women	mixed	boys	girls
WC Singles	men	women	quad
WC Doubles	men	women	quad
Legends	men	women	mixed
- Australian Open

Cara Black and Liezel Huber were the defending champions, but lost in the quarterfinals to sisters Alona Bondarenko and Kateryna Bondarenko.

The Bondarenkos won in the final 2–6, 6–1, 6–4, against Victoria Azarenka and Shahar Pe'er.

== Seeds ==
1. (Zimbabwe) Cara Black / (United States) Liezel Huber (quarterfinals)
2. (Slovenia) Katarina Srebotnik / (Japan) Ai Sugiyama (second round)
3. (Chinese Taipei) Chan Yung-jan / (Chinese Taipei) Chuang Chia-jung (third round)
4. (Czech Republic) Květa Peschke / (Australia) Rennae Stubbs (quarterfinals)
5. (France) Nathalie Dechy / (Russia) Dinara Safina (first round)
6. (India) Sania Mirza / (Australia) Alicia Molik (third round)
7. (China) Yan Zi / (China) Zheng Jie (semifinals)
8. (China) Peng Shuai / (China) Sun Tiantian (second round)
9. (United States) Lisa Raymond / (Italy) Francesca Schiavone (first round)
10. (Spain) Anabel Medina Garrigues / (Spain) Virginia Ruano Pascual (semifinals)
11. (Russia) Maria Kirilenko / (Hungary) Ágnes Szávay (first round)
12. (Belarus) Victoria Azarenka / (Israel) Shahar Pe'er (final)
13. (Slovakia) Janette Husárová / (Italy) Flavia Pennetta (quarterfinals)
14. (United States) Vania King / (Australia) Nicole Pratt (first round)
15. (Italy) Maria Elena Camerin / (Argentina) Gisela Dulko (first round)
16. (Czech Republic) Iveta Benešová / (Russia) Galina Voskoboeva (third round)

== Draw ==
Key

- Q = Qualifier
- WC = Wild card
- LL = Lucky loser
- Alt = Alternate
- ITF = ITF entry
- PR = Protected ranking
- SR = Special ranking
- SE = Special exempt
- JE = Junior exempt
- JR = Junior Accelerator Programme entrant
- CO = College Accelerator Programme entrant
- NG = Next Gen Accelerator Program entrant
- w/o = Walkover
- r = Retired
- d = Defaulted

=== Finals ===
Quarterfinals
1	(Zimbabwe) Cara Black (United States) Liezel Huber	3	2
(Ukraine) Alona Bondarenko (Ukraine) Kateryna Bondarenko	6	6
4	(Czech Republic) Květa Peschke (Australia) Rennae Stubbs	4	1
10	(Spain) Anabel Medina Garrigues (Spain) Virginia Ruano Pascual	6	6
12	(Belarus) Victoria Azarenka (Israel) Shahar Pe'er	6	6
13	(Slovakia) Janette Husárová (Italy) Flavia Pennetta	1	1
7	(China) Yan Zi (China) Zheng Jie	3	6	6
(United States) Serena Williams (United States) Venus Williams	6	4	2

Semifinals
(Ukraine) Alona Bondarenko (Ukraine) Kateryna Bondarenko	6	6
10	(Spain) Anabel Medina Garrigues (Spain) Virginia Ruano Pascual	2	4
12	(Belarus) Victoria Azarenka (Israel) Shahar Pe'er	0	7	7^{7}
7	(China) Yan Zi (China) Zheng Jie	6	5	6^{3}

Final
(Ukraine) Alona Bondarenko (Ukraine) Kateryna Bondarenko	2	6	6
12	(Belarus) Victoria Azarenka (Israel) Shahar Pe'er	6	1	4

=== Top half ===
==== Section 1 ====
First round
1	(Zimbabwe) C Black (United States) L Huber	6	6
(Luxembourg) A Kremer (France) P Parmentier	1	1
(Belarus) T Poutchek (Australia) A Rodionova	6	6
WC	(Australia) T Calderwood (Australia) A Hubacek	1	2
(Russia) S Kuznetsova (France) A Mauresmo	6	6
WC	(Australia) D Dominikovic (Australia) E Hewson	2	0
(Ukraine) M Koryttseva (Ukraine) T Perebiynis	6	7
15	(Italy) M Camerin (Argentina) G Dulko	4	5
11	(Russia) M Kirilenko (Hungary) Á Szávay	2	5
(United States) L Davenport (Slovakia) D Hantuchová	6	7
(Czech Republic) G Navrátilová (Czech Republic) K Zakopalová	4	7^{7}	6
WC	(Australia) C Dellacqua (Australia) J Moore	6	6^{5}	3
(France) S Cohen-Aloro (France) V Razzano	6^{3}	3
(Ukraine) A Bondarenko (Ukraine) K Bondarenko	7^{7}	6
(Russia) A Chakvetadze (China) N Li	2	7^{9}	2
8	(China) S Peng (China) T Sun	6	6^{7}	6

Second round
1	(Zimbabwe) C Black (United States) L Huber	6	6
(Belarus) T Poutchek (Australia) A Rodionova	2	4
(Russia) S Kuznetsova (France) A Mauresmo
(Ukraine) M Koryttseva (Ukraine) T Perebiynis	w/o
(United States) L Davenport (Slovakia) D Hantuchová	6	6
(Czech Republic) G Navrátilová (Czech Republic) K Zakopalová	2	1
(Ukraine) A Bondarenko (Ukraine) K Bondarenko	4	6	7^{8}
8	(China) S Peng (China) T Sun	6	4	6^{6}

Third round
1	(Zimbabwe) C Black (United States) L Huber	6	6
(Ukraine) M Koryttseva (Ukraine) T Perebiynis	2	2
(United States) L Davenport (Slovakia) D Hantuchová
(Ukraine) A Bondarenko (Ukraine) K Bondarenko	w/o

Quarterfinals
1	(Zimbabwe) C Black (United States) L Huber	3	2
(Ukraine) A Bondarenko (Ukraine) K Bondarenko	6	6

==== Section 2 ====
First round
4	(Czech Republic) K Peschke (Australia) R Stubbs	7^{7}	7^{7}
Alt	(Ukraine) O Savchuk (Russia) Y Shvedova	6^{4}	6^{4}
(Croatia) J Kostanić Tošić (Germany) M Müller	6	6
WC	(Australia) M Mirkovic (Australia) K Wlodarczak	1	2
(France) S Foretz (Tunisia) S Sfar	4	6	6
(Czech Republic) L Hradecká (Czech Republic) R Voráčová	6	3	4
(France) A Cornet (France) C Pin	3	5
16	(Czech Republic) I Benešová (Russia) G Voskoboeva	6	7
10	(Spain) A Medina Garrigues (Spain) V Ruano Pascual	6	6
(Germany) A Kerber (Austria) Y Meusburger	2	0
(Spain) L Domínguez Lino (Spain) A Parra Santonja	3	5
(Japan) A Nakamura (Thailand) T Tanasugarn	6	7
(Belarus) O Govortsova (Belarus) D Kustova	6	7
(Romania) E Gallovits (Romania) IR Olaru	3	5
(Serbia) J Janković (United States) B Mattek	6	6	6
5	(France) N Dechy (Russia) D Safina	3	7	4

Second round
4	(Czech Republic) K Peschke (Australia) R Stubbs	6	6
(Croatia) J Kostanić Tošić (Germany) M Müller	1	1
(France) S Foretz (Tunisia) S Sfar	2	3
16	(Czech Republic) I Benešová (Russia) G Voskoboeva	6	6
10	(Spain) A Medina Garrigues (Spain) V Ruano Pascual	6	6
(Japan) A Nakamura (Thailand) T Tanasugarn	3	1
(Belarus) O Govortsova (Belarus) D Kustova	4	3
(Serbia) J Janković (United States) B Mattek	6	6

Third round
4	(Czech Republic) K Peschke (Australia) R Stubbs	4	6	6
16	(Czech Republic) I Benešová (Russia) G Voskoboeva	6	2	4
10	(Spain) A Medina Garrigues (Spain) V Ruano Pascual	6	6^{5}	6
(Serbia) J Janković (United States) B Mattek	2	7^{7}	2

Quarterfinals
4	(Czech Republic) K Peschke (Australia) R Stubbs	4	1
10	(Spain) A Medina Garrigues (Spain) V Ruano Pascual	6	6

=== Bottom half ===
==== Section 3 ====
First round
6	(India) S Mirza (Australia) A Molik	6	4	6
(Greece) E Daniilidou (Germany) J Wöhr	3	6	4
WC	(Australia) S Ferguson (Australia) T Musgrave	3	4
(Russia) N Petrova (Russia) E Vesnina	6	6
WC	(Australia) A Bai (Australia) N Kriz	4	1
(Switzerland) E Gagliardi (Switzerland) P Schnyder	6	6
(Austria) S Bammer (Austria) T Paszek	1	3
12	(Belarus) V Azarenka (Israel) S Pe'er	6	6
13	(Slovakia) J Husárová (Italy) F Pennetta	6	6
(United States) J Craybas (United States) L Osterloh	4	2
(France) S Brémond (Ukraine) J Vakulenko	6	2	3
(China) C Ji (China) S Sun	4	6	6
(United States) L Granville (Czech Republic) V Uhlířová	3	6	7^{7}
(United States) A Harkleroad (Israel) T Obziler	6	2	6^{4}
Alt	(Poland) A Rosolska (Argentina) ME Salerni	3	1
3	(Chinese Taipei) Y-j Chan (Chinese Taipei) C-j Chuang	6	6

Second round
6	(India) S Mirza (Australia) A Molik	6	5	6
(Russia) N Petrova (Russia) E Vesnina	3	7	4
(Switzerland) E Gagliardi (Switzerland) P Schnyder	3	3
12	(Belarus) V Azarenka (Israel) S Pe'er	6	6
13	(Slovakia) J Husárová (Italy) F Pennetta	6	6
(China) C Ji (China) S Sun	0	3
(United States) L Granville (Czech Republic) V Uhlířová	1	4
3	(Chinese Taipei) Y-j Chan (Chinese Taipei) C-j Chuang	6	6

Third round
6	(India) S Mirza (Australia) A Molik	5	3
12	(Belarus) V Azarenka (Israel) S Pe'er	7	6
13	(Slovakia) J Husárová (Italy) F Pennetta	6	7^{7}
3	(Chinese Taipei) Y-j Chan (Chinese Taipei) C-j Chuang	2	6^{3}

Quarterfinals
12	(Belarus) V Azarenka (Israel) S Pe'er	6	6
13	(Slovakia) J Husárová (Italy) F Pennetta	1	1

==== Section 4 ====
First round
7	(China) Z Yan (China) J Zheng	6	6
(Russia) O Puchkova (France) A Rezaï	2	1
(Italy) S Errani (Italy) K Knapp	6	2	0
(Poland) K Jans (Denmark) C Wozniacki	1	6	6
(Netherlands) M Krajicek (Poland) A Radwańska	6	4	4
(Chinese Taipei) S-w Hsieh (Russia) A Kudryavtseva	4	6	6
(Czech Republic) N Vaidišová (Czech Republic) B Záhlavová-Strýcová	2	6	6
9	(United States) L Raymond (Italy) F Schiavone	6	4	2
14	(United States) V King (Australia) N Pratt	5	3
(Estonia) M Ani (United States) M Tu	7	6
(Italy) T Garbin (Italy) R Vinci	6	7^{9}
(Russia) A Jidkova (Japan) A Morigami	4	6^{7}
WC	(Australia) M Adamczak (Australia) C Wheeler	5	1
(United States) S Williams (United States) V Williams	7	6
(Australia) J Gajdošová (Australia) B Stewart	4	3
2	(Slovenia) K Srebotnik (Japan) A Sugiyama	6	6

Second round
7	(China) Z Yan (China) J Zheng	6	6
(Poland) K Jans (Denmark) C Wozniacki	2	3
(Chinese Taipei) S-w Hsieh (Russia) A Kudryavtseva	3	4
(Czech Republic) N Vaidišová (Czech Republic) B Záhlavová-Strýcová	6	6
(Estonia) M Ani (United States) M Tu	6	7^{7}
(Italy) T Garbin (Italy) R Vinci	4	6^{4}
(United States) S Williams (United States) V Williams	6	7^{7}
2	(Slovenia) K Srebotnik (Japan) A Sugiyama	2	6^{2}

Third round
7	(China) Z Yan (China) J Zheng	6	6
(Czech Republic) N Vaidišová (Czech Republic) B Záhlavová-Strýcová	4	1
(Estonia) M Ani (United States) M Tu	4	1
(United States) S Williams (United States) V Williams	6	6

Quarterfinals
7	(China) Z Yan (China) J Zheng	3	6	6
(United States) S Williams (United States) V Williams	6	4	2
