= 2008 Australian Open – Women's singles =

Women's singles
- 2008 Australian Open

Final
- Champion: (Russia) Maria Sharapova
- Runner-up: (Serbia) Ana Ivanovic
- Score: 7–5, 6–3

Details
- Draw: 128 (12Q / 8WC)
- Seeds: 32

Events
Singles	men	women		boys	girls
Doubles	men	women	mixed	boys	girls
WC Singles	men	women	quad
WC Doubles	men	women	quad
Legends	men	women	mixed
- Australian Open

Maria Sharapova defeated Ana Ivanovic in the final, 7–5, 6–3 to win the women's singles tennis title at the 2008 Australian Open. It was her third major singles title, and she became the first Russian to win the title. Sharapova did not lose a set during the tournament, or face a tiebreak in any set. It was Ivanovic's second runner-up finish in as many major finals, though she would win the French Open a few months later.

Serena Williams was the defending champion, but was defeated in the quarterfinals by Jelena Janković.

Justine Henin's winning streak of 33 matches (beginning at the 2007 Rogers Cup) ended with her defeat in the quarterfinals to Sharapova.

Agnieszka Radwańska became the first Pole to reach a major quarterfinal in the Open Era, and the first to do so since Jadwiga Jędrzejowska in the 1939 Wimbledon Championships.

This marked the first Australian Open appearances for future world No. 1s and future champions Angelique Kerber and Caroline Wozniacki; they lost to Francesca Schiavone and Ivanovic in the second and fourth rounds, respectively.

== Seeds ==
1. (Belgium) Justine Henin (quarterfinals)
2. (Russia) Svetlana Kuznetsova (third round)
3. (Serbia) Jelena Janković (semifinals)
4. (Serbia) Ana Ivanovic (final)
5. (Russia) Maria Sharapova (champion)
6. (Russia) Anna Chakvetadze (third round)
7. (United States) Serena Williams (quarterfinals)
8. (United States) Venus Williams (quarterfinals)
9. (Slovakia) Daniela Hantuchová (semifinals)
10. (France) Marion Bartoli (first round)
11. (Russia) Elena Dementieva (fourth round)
12. (Czech Republic) Nicole Vaidišová (fourth round)
13. (France) Tatiana Golovin (second round)
14. (Russia) Nadia Petrova (fourth round)
15. (Switzerland) Patty Schnyder (second round)
16. (Russia) Dinara Safina (first round)

17. (Israel) Shahar Pe'er (third round)
18. (France) Amélie Mauresmo (third round)
19. (Austria) Sybille Bammer (second round)
20. (Hungary) Ágnes Szávay (first round)
21. (Ukraine) Alona Bondarenko (second round)
22. (Czech Republic) Lucie Šafářová (first round)
23. (Russia) Vera Zvonareva (first round)
24. (China) Li Na (third round)
25. (Italy) Francesca Schiavone (third round)
26. (Belarus) Victoria Azarenka (third round)
27. (Russia) Maria Kirilenko (fourth round)
28. (Slovenia) Katarina Srebotnik (third round)
29. (Poland) Agnieszka Radwańska (quarterfinals)
30. (France) Virginie Razzano (third round)
31. (India) Sania Mirza (third round)
32. (Ukraine) Julia Vakulenko (first round)

Click on the seed number of a player to go to their draw section.

== Draw ==
Key

- Q = Qualifier
- WC = Wild card
- LL = Lucky loser
- Alt = Alternate
- ITF = ITF entry
- PR = Protected ranking
- SR = Special ranking
- SE = Special exempt
- JE = Junior exempt
- JR = Junior Accelerator Programme entrant
- CO = College Accelerator Programme entrant
- NG = Next Gen Accelerator Program entrant
- w/o = Walkover
- r = Retired
- d = Defaulted

=== Finals ===
Quarterfinals
1	(Belgium) Justine Henin	4	0
5	(Russia) Maria Sharapova	6	6
3	(Serbia) Jelena Janković	6	6
7	(United States) Serena Williams	3	4
8	(United States) Venus Williams	6^{3}	4
4	(Serbia) Ana Ivanovic	7^{7}	6
9	(Slovakia) Daniela Hantuchová	6	6
29	(Poland) Agnieszka Radwańska	2	2

Semifinals
5	(Russia) Maria Sharapova	6	6
3	(Serbia) Jelena Janković	3	1
4	(Serbia) Ana Ivanovic	0	6	6
9	(Slovakia) Daniela Hantuchová	6	3	4

Final
5	(Russia) Maria Sharapova	7	6
4	(Serbia) Ana Ivanovic	5	3

=== Top half ===
==== Section 1 ====
First round
1	(Belgium) J Henin	6	6
(Japan) A Nakamura	2	2
WC	(Australia) M Adamczak	4	0
(Russia) O Puchkova	6	6
(Estonia) M Ani	6	3	2
(Germany) A Kerber	0	6	6
(France) É Loit	3	6^{5}
25	(Italy) F Schiavone	6	7^{7}
19	(Austria) S Bammer	6^{6}	6	6
Q	(Thailand) T Tanasugarn	7^{8}	4	2
Q	(Chinese Taipei) S-w Hsieh	2	6	8
(Czech Republic) K Zakopalová	6	4	6
(Ukraine) K Bondarenko	6^{4}	2
(France) A Rezaï	7^{7}	6
(France) S Cohen-Aloro	1	6	3
13	(France) T Golovin	6	4	6

Second round
1	(Belgium) J Henin	6	7
(Russia) O Puchkova	1	5
(Germany) A Kerber	2	3
25	(Italy) F Schiavone	6	6
19	(Austria) S Bammer	2	0
Q	(Chinese Taipei) S-w Hsieh	6	6
(France) A Rezaï	6	3	6
13	(France) T Golovin	3	6	3

Third round
1	(Belgium) J Henin	7	6
25	(Italy) F Schiavone	5	4
Q	(Chinese Taipei) S-w Hsieh	6	6^{3}	6
(France) A Rezaï	2	7^{7}	4

Fourth round
1	(Belgium) J Henin	6	6
Q	(Chinese Taipei) S-w Hsieh	2	2

==== Section 2 ====
First round
11	(Russia) E Dementieva	6	6
(Israel) T Obziler	2	2
(Spain) A Medina Garrigues	7^{7}	6
(Czech Republic) P Cetkovská	6^{1}	0
WC	(Australia) J Moore	6	6
(United States) J Ditty	3	2
(Czech Republic) R Voráčová	2	6	0
17	(Israel) S Pe'er	6	2	6
32	(Ukraine) J Vakulenko	4	6	4
(Russia) E Vesnina	6	1	6
(United States) J Craybas	6	6
(Chinese Taipei) Y-j Chan	4	2
(United States) L Davenport	6	3	7
(Italy) S Errani	2	6	5
(Croatia) J Kostanić Tošić	4	3
5	(Russia) M Sharapova	6	6

Second round
11	(Russia) E Dementieva	5	6	6
(Spain) A Medina Garrigues	7	2	3
WC	(Australia) J Moore	0	5
17	(Israel) S Pe'er	6	7
(Russia) E Vesnina	6	6
(United States) J Craybas	2	4
(United States) L Davenport	1	3
5	(Russia) M Sharapova	6	6

Third round
11	(Russia) E Dementieva	6	6
17	(Israel) S Pe'er	2	0
(Russia) E Vesnina	3	0
5	(Russia) M Sharapova	6	6

Fourth round
11	(Russia) E Dementieva	2	0
5	(Russia) M Sharapova	6	6

==== Section 3 ====
First round
3	(Serbia) J Janković	2	6	12
(Austria) T Paszek	6	2	10
(Canada) S Dubois	6^{7}	3
(Romania) E Gallovits	7^{9}	6
(Italy) F Pennetta	6	5	6
(Slovakia) D Cibulková	4	7	4
(United States) A Harkleroad	3	5
30	(France) V Razzano	6	7
18	(France) A Mauresmo	6^{6}	6	6
(Belarus) T Poutchek	7^{8}	0	0
(Russia) Y Shvedova	6	6
(Germany) T Malek	2	2
(Australia) C Dellacqua	4	6	8
(Italy) K Knapp	6	3	6
(United States) L Osterloh	3	3
15	(Switzerland) P Schnyder	6	6

Second round
3	(Serbia) J Janković	6	7
(Romania) E Gallovits	2	5
(Italy) F Pennetta	2	7	3
30	(France) V Razzano	6	5	6
18	(France) A Mauresmo	6	7^{7}
(Russia) Y Shvedova	4	6^{5}
(Australia) C Dellacqua	4	7	8
15	(Switzerland) P Schnyder	6	5	6

Third round
3	(Serbia) J Janković	6	4	6
30	(France) V Razzano	2	6	1
18	(France) A Mauresmo	6	4	4
(Australia) C Dellacqua	3	6	6

Fourth round
3	(Serbia) J Janković	7^{7}	6
(Australia) C Dellacqua	6^{3}	1

==== Section 4 ====
First round
12	(Czech Republic) N Vaidišová	6	6
(Romania) R Olaru	3	0
(Estonia) K Kanepi	6^{4}	5
(Australia) A Molik	7^{7}	7
WC	(United States) M Brengle	5	2
(Ukraine) T Perebiynis	7	6
(Japan) A Sugiyama	6	1
23	(Russia) V Zvonareva	3	1^{r}
26	(Belarus) V Azarenka	6	7
(Uzbekistan) A Amanmuradova	2	5
Q	(Germany) S Klösel	6	6^{1}	6
Q	(Germany) J Schruff	1	7^{7}	4
Q	(Russia) E Ivanova	6	4	2
Q	(China) M Yuan	4	6	6
WC	(Slovakia) J Gajdošová	3	3
7	(United States) S Williams	6	6

Second round
12	(Czech Republic) N Vaidišová	6	6
(Australia) A Molik	2	3
(Ukraine) T Perebiynis	4	4
(Japan) A Sugiyama	6	6
26	(Belarus) V Azarenka	6	6
Q	(Germany) S Klösel	1	1
Q	(China) M Yuan	3	1
7	(United States) S Williams	6	6

Third round
12	(Czech Republic) N Vaidišová	6	6
(Japan) A Sugiyama	3	4
26	(Belarus) V Azarenka	3	4
7	(United States) S Williams	6	6

Fourth round
12	(Czech Republic) N Vaidišová	3	4
7	(United States) S Williams	6	6

=== Bottom half ===
==== Section 5 ====
First round
8	(United States) V Williams	6	7
(China) Z Yan	2	5
(France) C Pin	5	6	6
Q	(Romania) M Niculescu	7	1	1
WC	(Australia) S Ferguson	4	3
Q	(Switzerland) T Bacsinszky	6	6
WC	(Uzbekistan) I Tulyaganova	4	2
31	(India) S Mirza	6	6
24	(China) N Li	6	4	6
(France) S Brémond	2	6	4
(Italy) ME Camerin	6	6
WC	(Australia) C Wheeler	1	2
WC	(France) M Johansson	1	1
Q	(Poland) M Domachowska	6	6
(Sweden) S Arvidsson	6^{3}	6	6
10	(France) M Bartoli	7^{7}	4	3

Second round
8	(United States) V Williams	7	6
(France) C Pin	5	4
Q	(Switzerland) T Bacsinszky	1	6	5
31	(India) S Mirza	6	4	7
24	(China) N Li	6	6
(Italy) ME Camerin	4	3
Q	(Poland) M Domachowska	7	1	6
(Sweden) S Arvidsson	5	6	1

Third round
8	(United States) V Williams	7^{7}	6
31	(India) S Mirza	6^{0}	4
24	(China) N Li	6	2	4
Q	(Poland) M Domachowska	2	6	6

Fourth round
8	(United States) V Williams	6	6
Q	(Poland) M Domachowska	4	4

==== Section 6 ====
First round
16	(Russia) D Safina	6^{4}	6	2
Q	(Germany) S Lisicki	7^{7}	4	6
(Argentina) ME Salerni	2	3
(Ukraine) M Koryttseva	6	6
(Denmark) C Wozniacki	6	6
(Argentina) G Dulko	1	1
(Russia) A Kudryavtseva	4	6^{4}
21	(Ukraine) A Bondarenko	6	7^{7}
28	(Slovenia) K Srebotnik	4	6	9
(Spain) L Domínguez Lino	6	0	7
Q	(Germany) A Bachmann	6^{3}	4
(Russia) A Rodionova	7^{7}	6
(Italy) T Garbin	6	6
(Greece) E Daniilidou	2	2
(Romania) S Cîrstea	5	3
4	(Serbia) A Ivanovic	7	6

Second round
Q	(Germany) S Lisicki	6	7
(Ukraine) M Koryttseva	1	5
(Denmark) C Wozniacki	7^{7}	6
21	(Ukraine) A Bondarenko	6^{4}	1
28	(Slovenia) K Srebotnik	6	6
(Russia) A Rodionova	4	1
(Italy) T Garbin	0	3
4	(Serbia) A Ivanovic	6	6

Third round
Q	(Germany) S Lisicki	6	4	3
(Denmark) C Wozniacki	4	6	6
28	(Slovenia) K Srebotnik	3	4
4	(Serbia) A Ivanovic	6	6

Fourth round
(Denmark) C Wozniacki	1	6^{2}
4	(Serbia) A Ivanovic	6	7^{7}

==== Section 7 ====
First round
6	(Russia) A Chakvetadze	0
(Germany) A Petkovic	0^{r}
(China) S Peng	5	6	7
Q	(Russia) A Kleybanova	7	4	9
(Japan) A Morigami	6	6
(Netherlands) M Krajicek	2	2
(United States) M Tu	4	6	3
27	(Russia) M Kirilenko	6	4	6
22	(Czech Republic) L Šafářová	1	4
(Colombia) C Castaño	6	6
(Italy) R Vinci	4	4
(Spain) V Ruano Pascual	6	6
(France) A Cornet	6	6
PR	(Argentina) C Fernández	3	3
(United States) V King	3	5
9	(Slovakia) D Hantuchová	6	7

Second round
6	(Russia) A Chakvetadze	6	6
Q	(Russia) A Kleybanova	3	4
(Japan) A Morigami	1	1
27	(Russia) M Kirilenko	6	6
(Colombia) C Castaño	2	4
(Spain) V Ruano Pascual	6	6
(France) A Cornet	2	5
9	(Slovakia) D Hantuchová	6	7

Third round
6	(Russia) A Chakvetadze	7^{8}	1	2
27	(Russia) M Kirilenko	6^{6}	6	6
(Spain) V Ruano Pascual	2	3
9	(Slovakia) D Hantuchová	6	6

Fourth round
27	(Russia) M Kirilenko	6	4	4
9	(Slovakia) D Hantuchová	1	6	6

==== Section 8 ====
First round
14	(Russia) N Petrova	6	6
(Australia) N Pratt	1	3
PR	(Israel) E Linetskaya	6^{8}	0
(Luxembourg) A Kremer	7^{10}	6
(United States) L Granville	1	4
(Austria) Y Meusburger	6	6
(Russia) E Makarova	3	6	7
20	(Hungary) Á Szávay	6	4	5
29	(Poland) A Radwańska	6	6
(Ukraine) O Savchuk	0	1
(Germany) M Müller	5	3
(France) P Parmentier	7	6
(Belarus) O Govortsova	1	1
(Bulgaria) T Pironkova	6	6
(France) N Dechy	3	1
2	(Russia) S Kuznetsova	6	6

Second round
14	(Russia) N Petrova	7	7
(Luxembourg) A Kremer	5	5
(Austria) Y Meusburger	3	1
(Russia) E Makarova	6	6
29	(Poland) A Radwańska	7	6
(France) P Parmentier	5	4
(Bulgaria) T Pironkova	6^{0}	2
2	(Russia) S Kuznetsova	7^{7}	6

Third round
14	(Russia) N Petrova	6	7^{10}
(Russia) E Makarova	1	6^{8}
29	(Poland) A Radwańska	6	6
2	(Russia) S Kuznetsova	3	4

Fourth round
14	(Russia) N Petrova	6	5	0
29	(Poland) A Radwańska	1	7	6

== Championship match statistics ==
Category	(Russia) Sharapova	(Serbia) Ivanovic
1st serve %	27/50 (54%)	42/70 (60%)
1st serve points won	24 of 27 = 89%	26 of 42 = 62%
2nd serve points won	16 of 23 = 70%	14 of 28 = 50%
Total service points won	40 of 50 = 80.00%	40 of 70 = 57.14%
Aces	1	3
Double faults	3	4
Winners	16	14
Unforced errors	15	33
Net points won	7 of 10 = 70%	4 of 11 = 36%
Break points converted	4 of 9 = 44%	1 of 2 = 50%
Return points won	30 of 70 = 43%	10 of 50 = 20%
Total points won	70	50

Preceded by 2007 US Open – Women's singles	Grand Slam women's singles	Succeeded by 2008 French Open – Women's singles
