= 2008 Australian Open – Men's doubles =

Men's doubles
- 2008 Australian Open

Final
- Champion: (Israel) Jonathan Erlich (Israel) Andy Ram
- Runner-up: (France) Arnaud Clément (France) Michaël Llodra
- Score: 7–5, 7–6^{(7–4)}

Details
- Draw: 64
- Seeds: 16

Events
Singles	men	women		boys	girls
Doubles	men	women	mixed	boys	girls
WC Singles	men	women	quad
WC Doubles	men	women	quad
Legends	men	women	mixed
- Australian Open

Bob Bryan and Mike Bryan were the defending champions, but lost in the quarterfinals to Mahesh Bhupathi and Mark Knowles.

Jonathan Erlich and Andy Ram won in the final 7–5, 7–6(4), against Arnaud Clément and Michaël Llodra. They became the first all-Israeli pair to win a Grand Slam title.

== Seeds ==
1. (United States) Bob Bryan / (United States) Mike Bryan (quarterfinals)
2. (Canada) Daniel Nestor / (Serbia) Nenad Zimonjić (quarterfinals)
3. (Sweden) Simon Aspelin / (Austria) Julian Knowle (first round)
4. (Czech Republic) Martin Damm / (Czech Republic) Pavel Vízner (quarterfinals)
5. (Australia) Paul Hanley / (India) Leander Paes (second round)
6. (India) Mahesh Bhupathi / (The Bahamas) Mark Knowles (semifinals)
7. (France) Arnaud Clément / (France) Michaël Llodra (final)
8. (Israel) Jonathan Erlich / (Israel) Andy Ram (champions)
9. (Czech Republic) František Čermák / (Czech Republic) Lukáš Dlouhý (third round)
10. (United States) Eric Butorac / (Zimbabwe) Kevin Ullyett (third round)
11. (Poland) Mariusz Fyrstenberg / (Poland) Marcin Matkowski (third round)
12. (Belarus) Max Mirnyi / (United Kingdom) Jamie Murray (first round)
13. (Brazil) Marcelo Melo / (Brazil) André Sá (first round)
14. (France) Julien Benneteau / (France) Nicolas Mahut (third round)
15. (Germany) Christopher Kas / (Netherlands) Rogier Wassen (third round)
16. (Czech Republic) Leoš Friedl / (Czech Republic) David Škoch (second round)

== Draw ==
Key

- Q = Qualifier
- WC = Wild card
- LL = Lucky loser
- Alt = Alternate
- ITF = ITF entry
- PR = Protected ranking
- SR = Special ranking
- SE = Special exempt
- JE = Junior exempt
- JR = Junior Accelerator Programme entrant
- CO = College Accelerator Programme entrant
- NG = Next Gen Accelerator Program entrant
- w/o = Walkover
- r = Retired
- d = Defaulted

=== Finals ===
Quarterfinals
1	(United States) Bob Bryan (United States) Mike Bryan	3	7	6^{5}
6	(India) Mahesh Bhupathi (The Bahamas) Mark Knowles	6	5	7^{7}
(France) Marc Gicquel (France) Fabrice Santoro	4	1
8	(Israel) Jonathan Erlich (Israel) Andy Ram	6	6
(South Africa) Jeff Coetzee (South Africa) Wesley Moodie	7	5	6
4	(Czech Republic) Martin Damm (Czech Republic) Pavel Vízner	5	7	4
7	(France) Arnaud Clément (France) Michaël Llodra	6	6
2	(Canada) Daniel Nestor (Serbia) Nenad Zimonjić	4	4

Semifinals
6	(India) Mahesh Bhupathi (The Bahamas) Mark Knowles	4	4
8	(Israel) Jonathan Erlich (Israel) Andy Ram	6	6
(South Africa) Jeff Coetzee (South Africa) Wesley Moodie	3	6^{9}
7	(France) Arnaud Clément (France) Michaël Llodra	6	7^{11}

Final
8	(Israel) Jonathan Erlich (Israel) Andy Ram	7	7^{7}
7	(France) Arnaud Clément (France) Michaël Llodra	5	6^{4}

=== Top half ===
==== Section 1 ====
First round
1	(United States) B Bryan (United States) M Bryan	6	6
(Argentina) M González (Argentina) J Mónaco	3	2
(Argentina) C Berlocq (Italy) A Seppi	7	2	3
(Spain) N Almagro (Chile) N Massú	5	6	6
(Czech Republic) P Pála (Argentina) M Vassallo Argüello	6	7	4
(South Africa) R de Voest (South Africa) C Haggard	7	6	6
(Argentina) M García (Austria) O Marach	6	1	2
14	(France) J Benneteau (France) N Mahut	2	6	6
11	(Poland) M Fyrstenberg (Poland) M Matkowski	5	6	6
(Spain) G García López (Spain) F Verdasco	7	4	3
(Sweden) T Johansson (Romania) A Pavel	3	6	6
WC	(Australia) A Coelho (Australia) B Klein	6	3	3
(Israel) H Levy (Israel) D Sela	3	5
(Switzerland) Y Allegro (Belgium) K Vliegen	6	7
(Russia) M Youzhny (Germany) M Zverev	6^{10}	4
6	(India) M Bhupathi (The Bahamas) M Knowles	7^{12}	6

Second round
1	(United States) B Bryan (United States) M Bryan	6	6
(Spain) N Almagro (Chile) N Massú	3	4
(South Africa) R de Voest (South Africa) C Haggard	1	1
14	(France) J Benneteau (France) N Mahut	6	6
11	(Poland) M Fyrstenberg (Poland) M Matkowski	7^{7}	6^{5}	6
(Sweden) T Johansson (Romania) A Pavel	6^{3}	7^{7}	4
(Switzerland) Y Allegro (Belgium) K Vliegen	1	4
6	(India) M Bhupathi (The Bahamas) M Knowles	6	6

Third round
1	(United States) B Bryan (United States) M Bryan	6	6
14	(France) J Benneteau (France) N Mahut	3	4
11	(Poland) M Fyrstenberg (Poland) M Matkowski	3	2
6	(India) M Bhupathi (The Bahamas) M Knowles	6	6

Quarterfinals
1	(United States) B Bryan (United States) M Bryan	3	7	6
6	(India) M Bhupathi (The Bahamas) M Knowles	6	5	7

==== Section 2 ====
First round
3	(Sweden) S Aspelin (Austria) J Knowle	4	6	2
(Sweden) R Lindstedt (Finland) J Nieminen	6	4	6
(United States) H Armando (Belgium) X Malisse	4	3
(France) M Gicquel (France) F Santoro	6	6
WC	(Australia) C Ball (Australia) A Feeney	6	6
WC	(Australia) C Guccione (Australia) P Luczak	3	2
WC	(Australia) C Ebelthite (Australia) N Lindahl	7	3	6
16	(Czech Republic) L Friedl (Czech Republic) D Škoch	5	6	7
9	(Czech Republic) F Čermák (Czech Republic) L Dlouhý	6	6
(Belgium) S Darcis (Belgium) O Rochus	2	3
(Spain) M Granollers-Pujol (Spain) S Ventura	7	6
(United States) R Kendrick (United States) J Thomas	6	4
(United States) S Lipsky (United States) D Martin	6	6
(Spain) Ó Hernández (Spain) Montañés	2	4
(United States) A Roddick (Russia) D Tursunov	5	3
8	(Israel) J Erlich (Israel) A Ram	7	6

Second round
(Sweden) R Lindstedt (Finland) J Nieminen	6^{3}	6	3
(France) M Gicquel (France) F Santoro	7^{7}	3	6
WC	(Australia) C Ball (Australia) A Feeney	7^{7}	3	6
16	(Czech Republic) L Friedl (Czech Republic) D Škoch	6^{4}	6	3
9	(Czech Republic) F Čermák (Czech Republic) L Dlouhý	7^{7}	7^{7}
(Spain) M Granollers-Pujol (Spain) S Ventura	6^{5}	6^{5}
(United States) S Lipsky (United States) D Martin	6^{4}	0
8	(Israel) J Erlich (Israel) A Ram	7^{7}	6

Third round
(France) M Gicquel (France) F Santoro	6	6
WC	(Australia) C Ball (Australia) A Feeney	4	2
9	(Czech Republic) F Čermák (Czech Republic) L Dlouhý	5	3
8	(Israel) J Erlich (Israel) A Ram	7	6

Quarterfinals
(France) M Gicquel (France) F Santoro	4	1
8	(Israel) J Erlich (Israel) A Ram	6	6

=== Bottom half ===
==== Section 3 ====
First round
5	(Australia) P Hanley (India) L Paes	7^{7}	7^{7}
(Peru) L Horna (Austria) S Koubek	6^{2}	6^{5}
(United Kingdom) J Auckland (United States) S Querrey	1	6^{4}
(India) R Bopanna (United States) R Ram	6	7^{7}
(South Africa) J Coetzee (South Africa) W Moodie	6	6
(Germany) R Schüttler (Serbia) J Tipsarević	3	4
(France) É Roger-Vasselin (France) G Simon	7	1	6
12	(Belarus) M Mirnyi (United Kingdom) J Murray	6	6	3
13	(Brazil) M Melo (Brazil) A Sá	6^{11}	7^{7}	4
(Argentina) L Arnold Ker (Spain) F López	7^{13}	6^{4}	6
(Argentina) J Acasuso (Argentina) S Roitman	4	4
(Austria) W Eschauer (Germany) F Mayer	6	6
(France) S Grosjean (France) J-W Tsonga	6	6
(Canada) F Dancevic (Australia) S Huss	2	3
(Australia) J Kerr (Australia) T Perry	6	1	2
4	(Czech Republic) M Damm (Czech Republic) P Vízner	3	6	6

Second round
5	(Australia) P Hanley (India) L Paes	3	6	6^{6}
(India) R Bopanna (United States) R Ram	6	3	7^{8}
(South Africa) J Coetzee (South Africa) W Moodie	6	6
(France) É Roger-Vasselin (France) G Simon	2	3
(Argentina) L Arnold Ker (Spain) F López	w/o
(Austria) W Eschauer (Germany) F Mayer
(France) S Grosjean (France) J-W Tsonga	3	6	3
4	(Czech Republic) M Damm (Czech Republic) P Vízner	6	4	6

Third round
(India) R Bopanna (United States) R Ram	6	4	3
(South Africa) J Coetzee (South Africa) W Moodie	3	6	6
(Argentina) L Arnold Ker (Spain) F López	4	5
4	(Czech Republic) M Damm (Czech Republic) P Vízner	6	7

Quarterfinals
(South Africa) J Coetzee (South Africa) W Moodie	7	5	6
4	(Czech Republic) M Damm (Czech Republic) P Vízner	5	7	4

==== Section 4 ====
First round
7	(France) A Clément (France) M Llodra	7^{7}	6
(Thailand) S Ratiwatana (Thailand) S Ratiwatana	6^{4}	4
(Italy) S Bolelli (Italy) F Volandri	6	1	6^{3}
(Italy) F Fognini (Croatia) I Ljubičić	4	6	7^{7}
(Argentina) JP Brzezicki (Argentina) A Calleri	7^{7}	6
(United States) J Isner (Croatia) I Karlović	6^{3}	3
(Czech Republic) T Cibulec (Croatia) L Zovko	3	1
10	(United States) E Butorac (Zimbabwe) K Ullyett	6	6
15	(Germany) C Kas (Netherlands) R Wassen	6	6^{1}	6
WC	(Australia) S Groth (Australia) J Sirianni	3	7^{7}	3
WC	(Australia) N Healey (Australia) R Smeets	7	3	3
(South Korea) H-t Lee (France) F Serra	5	6	6
(Czech Republic) J Levinský (Slovakia) M Mertiňák	6^{3}	3
(Austria) J Melzer (Austria) A Peya	7^{7}	6
WC	(Australia) A Jones (Australia) G Jones	4	1
2	(Canada) D Nestor (Serbia) N Zimonjić	6	6

Second round
7	(France) A Clément (France) M Llodra	6	6
(Italy) F Fognini (Croatia) I Ljubičić	2	3
(Argentina) JP Brzezicki (Argentina) A Calleri
10	(United States) E Butorac (Zimbabwe) K Ullyett	w/o
15	(Germany) C Kas (Netherlands) R Wassen	6	6
(South Korea) H-t Lee (France) F Serra	1	2
(Austria) J Melzer (Austria) A Peya	2	3
2	(Canada) D Nestor (Serbia) N Zimonjić	6	6

Third round
7	(France) A Clément (France) M Llodra	6	6
10	(United States) E Butorac (Zimbabwe) K Ullyett	4	4
15	(Germany) C Kas (Netherlands) R Wassen	4	4
2	(Canada) D Nestor (Serbia) N Zimonjić	6	6

Quarterfinals
7	(France) A Clément (France) M Llodra	6	6
2	(Canada) D Nestor (Serbia) N Zimonjić	4	4
