= 2008 Australian Open – Men's singles =

Men's singles
- 2008 Australian Open

Final
- Champion: (Serbia) Novak Djokovic
- Runner-up: (France) Jo-Wilfried Tsonga
- Score: 4–6, 6–4, 6–3, 7–6^{(7–2)}

Details
- Draw: 128
- Seeds: 32

Events
Singles	men	women		boys	girls
Doubles	men	women	mixed	boys	girls
WC Singles	men	women	quad
WC Doubles	men	women	quad
Legends	men	women	mixed
- Australian Open

Novak Djokovic defeated Jo-Wilfried Tsonga in the final, 4–6, 6–4, 6–3, 7–6^{(7–2)} to win the men's singles tennis title at the 2008 Australian Open. It was his first major title, the first of a record ten Australian Open titles, and the first of an all-time record 24 major men's singles titles overall. Djokovic became the first Serbian man to win a major singles title. It was the first major final since the 2005 Australian Open not to feature either Roger Federer or Rafael Nadal, who were beaten by Djokovic and Tsonga, respectively, in the semifinals. Alongside second-seeded Nadal, Tsonga (unseeded in this tournament) defeated three more seeds en route to the final, including ninth-seed Andy Murray.

Federer was the two-time defending champion, but lost in to Djokovic in the semifinals in a rematch of the previous year's fourth round match. The loss ended Federer's record streak of ten consecutive major finals. However, he became the first man to reach 15 consecutive major quarterfinals (streak starting at the 2004 Wimbledon Championships), surpassing Roy Emerson and Ivan Lendl. This was the only major where Federer failed to reach the final between the 2005 Wimbledon Championships and the 2010 Australian Open, a span of 19 tournaments. He would go on to reach the next eight major finals (winning four of them).

This tournament marked the final Australian Open appearance of 2002 champion Thomas Johansson; he lost in the first round to Marcos Baghdatis.

== Seeds ==
1. (Switzerland) Roger Federer (semifinals)
2. (Spain) Rafael Nadal (semifinals)
3. (Serbia) Novak Djokovic (champion)
4. (Russia) Nikolay Davydenko (fourth round)
5. (Spain) David Ferrer (quarterfinals)
6. (United States) Andy Roddick (third round)
7. (Chile) Fernando González (third round)
8. (France) Richard Gasquet (fourth round)
9. (United Kingdom) Andy Murray (first round)
10. (Argentina) David Nalbandian (third round)
11. (Spain) Tommy Robredo (second round)
12. (United States) James Blake (quarterfinals)
13. (Czech Republic) Tomáš Berdych (fourth round)
14. (Russia) Mikhail Youzhny (quarterfinals)
15. (Cyprus) Marcos Baghdatis (third round)
16. (Spain) Carlos Moyá (first round)

17. (Croatia) Ivan Ljubičić (first round)
18. (Argentina) Juan Ignacio Chela (first round)
19. (Australia) Lleyton Hewitt (fourth round)
20. (Croatia) Ivo Karlović (third round)
21. (Argentina) Juan Mónaco (third round)
22. (Spain) Juan Carlos Ferrero (fourth round)
23. (France) Paul-Henri Mathieu (fourth round)
24. (Finland) Jarkko Nieminen (quarterfinals)
25. (Spain) Fernando Verdasco (second round)
26. (Switzerland) Stanislas Wawrinka (second round)
27. (Spain) Nicolás Almagro (first round)
28. (France) Gilles Simon (third round)
29. (Germany) Philipp Kohlschreiber (fourth round)
30. (Czech Republic) Radek Štěpánek (first round)
31. (Russia) Igor Andreev (third round)
32. (Russia) Dmitry Tursunov (second round)

Click on the seed number of a player to go to their draw section.

== Draw ==
Key

- Q = Qualifier
- WC = Wild card
- LL = Lucky loser
- Alt = Alternate
- ITF = ITF entry
- PR = Protected ranking
- SR = Special ranking
- SE = Special exempt
- JE = Junior exempt
- JR = Junior Accelerator Programme entrant
- CO = College Accelerator Programme entrant
- NG = Next Gen Accelerator Program entrant
- w/o = Walkover
- r = Retired
- d = Defaulted

=== Finals ===
Quarterfinals
1	(Switzerland) Roger Federer	7	7^{7}	6
12	(United States) James Blake	5	6^{5}	4
3	(Serbia) Novak Djokovic	6	6	7
5	(Spain) David Ferrer	0	3	5
(France) Jo-Wilfried Tsonga	7	6	7^{8}
14	(Russia) Mikhail Youzhny	5	0	6^{6}
24	(Finland) Jarkko Nieminen	5	3	1
2	(Spain) Rafael Nadal	7	6	6

Semifinals
1	(Switzerland) Roger Federer	5	3	6^{5}
3	(Serbia) Novak Djokovic	7	6	7^{7}
(France) Jo-Wilfried Tsonga	6	6	6
2	(Spain) Rafael Nadal	2	3	2

Final
3	(Serbia) Novak Djokovic	4	6	6	7^{7}
(France) Jo-Wilfried Tsonga	6	4	3	6^{2}

=== Top half ===
==== Section 1 ====
First round
1	(Switzerland) R Federer	6	6	6
(Argentina) D Hartfield	0	3	0
(France) F Santoro	6	6	6
(United States) J Isner	2	2	4
(Serbia) J Tipsarević	7	6	6^{6}	0	6
WC	(Australia) J Sirianni	5	2	7^{8}	6	0
(France) T Ascione	4	0	3
25	(Spain) F Verdasco	6	6	6
21	(Argentina) J Mónaco	7^{7}	7	6
(Argentina) C Berlocq	6^{5}	5	1
(United States) R Kendrick	4	5	2
Q	(United States) A Delic	6	7	6
(Spain) Ó Hernández	1	7^{7}	6	6
(Czech Republic) I Minář	6	6^{5}	2	1
(Austria) W Eschauer	4	4	4
13	(Czech Republic) T Berdych	6	6	6

Second round
1	(Switzerland) R Federer	6	6	6
(France) F Santoro	1	2	0
(Serbia) J Tipsarević	7	7^{7}	7^{7}
25	(Spain) F Verdasco	5	6^{3}	6^{3}
21	(Argentina) J Mónaco	6	7^{8}	5	6^{8}	8
Q	(United States) A Delic	3	6^{6}	7	7^{10}	6
(Spain) Ó Hernández	2	1	3
13	(Czech Republic) T Berdych	6	6	6

Third round
1	(Switzerland) R Federer	6^{5}	7^{7}	5	6	10
(Serbia) J Tipsarević	7^{7}	6^{1}	7	1	8
21	(Argentina) J Mónaco	6	3	6^{5}	2
13	(Czech Republic) T Berdych	3	6	7^{7}	6

Fourth round
1	(Switzerland) R Federer	6	7^{9}	6
13	(Czech Republic) T Berdych	4	6^{7}	3

==== Section 2 ====
First round
12	(United States) J Blake	6	6	6
(Chile) N Massú	3	2	2
(United States) M Russell	6	4	6	3	6
(Italy) F Fognini	1	6	2	6	3
(France) S Grosjean	7^{7}	6	7^{7}
(Italy) F Volandri	6^{3}	3	6^{0}
Q	(Netherlands) R Haase	6^{2}	6	6	7^{7}
17	(Croatia) I Ljubičić	7^{7}	3	0	6^{1}
27	(Spain) N Almagro	6^{4}	5	2
(Croatia) M Čilić	7^{7}	7	6
(Czech Republic) J Vaněk	3	4	4
(Austria) J Melzer	6	6	6
(South Korea) H-t Lee	7^{8}	6	6
(Australia) C Guccione	6^{6}	3	4
Q	(Greece) K Economidis	4	6^{2}	1
7	(Chile) F Gonzalez	6	7^{7}	6

Second round
12	(United States) J Blake	6	6	6
(United States) M Russell	3	2	2
(France) S Grosjean	4	6	6	6^{4}	6
Q	(Netherlands) R Haase	6	4	0	7^{7}	4
(Croatia) M Čilić	6	6	6
(Austria) J Melzer	4	3	4
(South Korea) H-t Lee	6	3	2	4
7	(Chile) F Gonzalez	4	6	6	6

Third round
12	(United States) J Blake	4	2	6	7^{7}	6
(France) S Grosjean	6	6	0	6^{5}	2
(Croatia) M Čilić	6	6^{4}	6	6
7	(Chile) F Gonzalez	2	7^{7}	3	1

Fourth round
12	(United States) J Blake	6	6	6
(Croatia) M Čilić	3	4	4

==== Section 3 ====
First round
3	(Serbia) N Djokovic	6	6	7^{7}
(Germany) B Becker	0	2	6^{5}
Q	(United States) R Ram	6^{5}	6	4	6	3
(Italy) S Bolelli	7^{7}	3	6	2	6
(United States) S Querrey	6	6	7
(Belgium) O Rochus	3	2	5
PR	(Belgium) X Malisse	7^{7}	7	2	1	3
32	(Russia) D Tursunov	6^{1}	5	6	6	6
19	(Australia) L Hewitt	6	6	6
(Belgium) S Darcis	0	3	0
WC	(Uzbekistan) D Istomin	6	6^{1}	7^{7}	6
Q	(Slovakia) L Lacko	3	7^{7}	6^{4}	1
(Latvia) E Gulbis	0	4	6^{2}
(Russia) M Safin	6	6	7^{7}
(Sweden) T Johansson	6^{0}	2	6	3
15	(Cyprus) M Baghdatis	7^{7}	6	3	6

Second round
3	(Serbia) N Djokovic	6	6	6
(Italy) S Bolelli	1	2	2
(United States) S Querrey	7^{7}	4	6	6
32	(Russia) D Tursunov	6^{5}	6	4	2
19	(Australia) L Hewitt	7^{7}	6	5	6
WC	(Uzbekistan) D Istomin	6^{5}	3	7	1
(Russia) M Safin	4	4	6	6	2
15	(Cyprus) M Baghdatis	6	6	2	3	6

Third round
3	(Serbia) N Djokovic	6	6	6
(United States) S Querrey	3	1	3
19	(Australia) L Hewitt	4	7	7	6^{4}	6
15	(Cyprus) M Baghdatis	6	5	5	7^{7}	3

Fourth round
3	(Serbia) N Djokovic	7	6	6
19	(Australia) L Hewitt	5	3	3

==== Section 4 ====
First round
10	(Argentina) D Nalbandian	6	6	7^{7}
WC	(Australia) R Smeets	1	1	6^{3}
(Argentina) M Zabaleta	1	7^{7}	3	4
(Australia) P Luczak	6	6^{2}	6	6
WC	(Australia) A Jones	6	6	3	6
(Spain) A Montañés	4	3	6	2
(Germany) N Kiefer	4	3	1
22	(Spain) JC Ferrero	6	6	6
30	(Czech Republic) R Štěpánek	6	6	5	2	3
(United States) V Spadea	2	2	7	6	6
Q	(Germany) D Gremelmayr	6	0	6	7
(Argentina) S Roitman	1	6	4	5
(Spain) S Ventura	3	1	3
(Argentina) JM del Potro	6	6	6
(France) É Roger-Vasselin	2	2	1
5	(Spain) D Ferrer	6	6	6

Second round
10	(Argentina) D Nalbandian	4	7	6	6
(Australia) P Luczak	6	5	4	1
WC	(Australia) A Jones	4	4	2
22	(Spain) JC Ferrero	6	6	6
(United States) V Spadea	4	6	6	2	9
Q	(Germany) D Gremelmayr	6	2	3	6	7
(Argentina) JM del Potro	3	4	0^{r}
5	(Spain) D Ferrer	6	6	0

Third round
10	(Argentina) D Nalbandian	1	2	3
22	(Spain) JC Ferrero	6	6	6
(United States) V Spadea	3	3	2
5	(Spain) D Ferrer	6	6	6

Fourth round
22	(Spain) JC Ferrero	5	6	4	1
5	(Spain) D Ferrer	7	3	6	6

=== Bottom half ===
==== Section 5 ====
First round
8	(France) R Gasquet	6	6	3	6
WC	(Australia) N Lindahl	0	1	6	2
(Spain) F López	7^{8}	6	6
Q	(United States) W Odesnik	6^{6}	1	4
(Belgium) K Vliegen	6	6	7^{7}
(France) O Patience	0	1	6^{3}
(Romania) A Pavel	7	2	6^{4}	3
31	(Russia) I Andreev	5	6	7^{7}	6
18	(Argentina) JI Chela	4	2	6	2
(Spain) G García López	6	6	1	6
(Colombia) A Falla	5	7	6^{8}	6	7
Q	(South Africa) K Anderson	7	5	7^{10}	2	5
Q	(United States) S Warburg	2	6	6	2	6
(Argentina) JP Brzezicki	6	2	3	6	4
(France) J-W Tsonga	7	6	0	7^{7}
9	(United Kingdom) A Murray	5	4	6	6^{5}

Second round
8	(France) R Gasquet	6	6	6
(Spain) F López	2	1	3
(Belgium) K Vliegen	5	5	2
31	(Russia) I Andreev	7	7	6
(Spain) G García López	6	5	6	7^{8}
(Colombia) A Falla	4	7	4	6^{6}
Q	(United States) S Warburg	4	6^{4}	2
(France) J-W Tsonga	6	7^{7}	6

Third round
8	(France) R Gasquet	6	6	4	6
31	(Russia) I Andreev	3	2	6	4
(Spain) G García López	3	4	2
(France) J-W Tsonga	6	6	6

Fourth round
8	(France) R Gasquet	2	7^{7}	6^{6}	3
(France) J-W Tsonga	6	6^{5}	7^{8}	6

==== Section 6 ====
First round
14	(Russia) M Youzhny	6	6	7^{7}
WC	(France) M Montcourt	0	2	6^{3}
Q	(Israel) H Levy	4	2	1
(Italy) A Seppi	6	6	6
(Israel) D Sela	6	6	6
Q	(Austria) M Slanar	2	4	2
Q	(United Kingdom) J Baker	4	4	7^{7}	4
20	(Croatia) I Karlović	6	6	6^{1}	6
26	(Switzerland) S Wawrinka	6	6	6
(France) J Benneteau	3	3	3
(Chinese Taipei) Y-h Lu	3	6	7^{8}	4	2
(France) M Gicquel	6	4	6^{6}	6	6
(France) N Mahut	7^{7}	5	6	3	7
(Argentina) J Acasuso	6^{2}	7	2	6	5
(France) M Llodra	5	5	3
4	(Russia) N Davydenko	7	7	6

Second round
14	(Russia) M Youzhny	4	7	6	7^{7}
(Italy) A Seppi	6	5	3	6^{4}
(Israel) D Sela	7^{7}	4	3	1
20	(Croatia) I Karlović	6^{5}	6	6	6
26	(Switzerland) S Wawrinka	2	6	6^{5}	1^{r}
(France) M Gicquel	6	3	7^{7}	2
(France) N Mahut	4	0	3
4	(Russia) N Davydenko	6	6	6

Third round
14	(Russia) M Youzhny	6	6	6
20	(Croatia) I Karlović	2	4	2
(France) M Gicquel	3	2	3
4	(Russia) N Davydenko	6	6	6

Fourth round
14	(Russia) M Youzhny	7^{7}	6	6
4	(Russia) N Davydenko	6^{2}	3	1

==== Section 7 ====
First round
6	(United States) A Roddick	6	6	7
Q	(Czech Republic) L Dlouhý	3	4	5
(United States) D Young	7^{7}	6^{4}	3	6^{5}
(Germany) M Berrer	6^{5}	7^{7}	6	7^{7}
(Russia) E Korolev	7	6	6
Q	(Spain) M Granollers	5	2	0
Q	(Croatia) R Karanušić	4	6^{5}	1
29	(Germany) P Kohlschreiber	6	7^{7}	6
24	(Finland) J Nieminen	6	6	5	2	6
(Canada) F Dancevic	3	1	7	6	1
WC	(United States) J Levine	6	7	6
(Argentina) M Vassallo Argüello	1	5	1
(United States) M Fish	6	6	3	6
(Serbia) B Pašanski	2	3	6	3
(Germany) M Zverev	6	6	6^{2}	4	5
11	(Spain) T Robredo	4	2	7^{7}	6	7

Second round
6	(United States) A Roddick	6	6	6
(Germany) M Berrer	2	2	4
(Russia) E Korolev	4	2	1^{r}
29	(Germany) P Kohlschreiber	6	6	0
24	(Finland) J Nieminen	6	7	7^{7}
WC	(United States) J Levine	2	5	6^{2}
(United States) M Fish	6	6	6
11	(Spain) T Robredo	1	2	3

Third round
6	(United States) A Roddick	4	6	6^{9}	7^{7}	6
29	(Germany) P Kohlschreiber	6	3	7^{11}	6^{3}	8
24	(Finland) J Nieminen	3	7^{7}	6	6
(United States) M Fish	6	6^{4}	3	1

Fourth round
29	(Germany) P Kohlschreiber	6	6^{7}	6^{9}	3
24	(Finland) J Nieminen	3	7^{9}	7^{11}	6

==== Section 8 ====
First round
16	(Spain) C Moyá	6^{5}	7^{7}	5	4
(Austria) S Koubek	7^{7}	6^{2}	7	6
(Peru) L Horna	4	7^{8}	3	4
(Argentina) A Calleri	6	6^{6}	6	6
(Chile) P Capdeville	6	7	6
WC	(Australia) B Klein	4	5	4
(Romania) V Hănescu	1	6^{4}	2
23	(France) P-H Mathieu	6	7^{7}	6
28	(France) G Simon	4	6	6	6^{4}	6
(United States) B Reynolds	6	4	2	7^{7}	4
(France) A Clément	4	2	7^{7}	4
(Germany) R Schüttler	6	6	6^{3}	6
(France) F Serra	6	7^{7}	7^{7}
(Germany) F Mayer	3	6^{2}	6^{5}
Q	(Serbia) V Troicki	6^{3}	5	1
2	(Spain) R Nadal	7^{7}	7	6

Second round
(Austria) S Koubek	6	7^{8}	7^{7}
(Argentina) A Calleri	3	6^{6}	6^{5}
(Chile) P Capdeville	7^{7}	0	4	4
23	(France) P-H Mathieu	6^{5}	6	6	6
28	(France) G Simon	6	6	6
(Germany) R Schüttler	2	2	1
(France) F Serra	0	2	2
2	(Spain) R Nadal	6	6	6

Third round
(Austria) S Koubek	6	6^{4}	6	5	6
23	(France) P-H Mathieu	4	7^{7}	2	7	8
28	(France) G Simon	5	2	3
2	(Spain) R Nadal	7	6	6

Fourth round
23	(France) P-H Mathieu	4	0^{r}
2	(Spain) R Nadal	6	3

Preceded by 2007 US Open – Men's singles	Grand Slam men's singles	Succeeded by 2008 French Open – Men's singles
