= 2010 Australian Open – Day-by-day summaries =

The 2010 Australian Open described in detail, in the form of day-by-day summaries.

== Hit for Haiti (17 January) ==
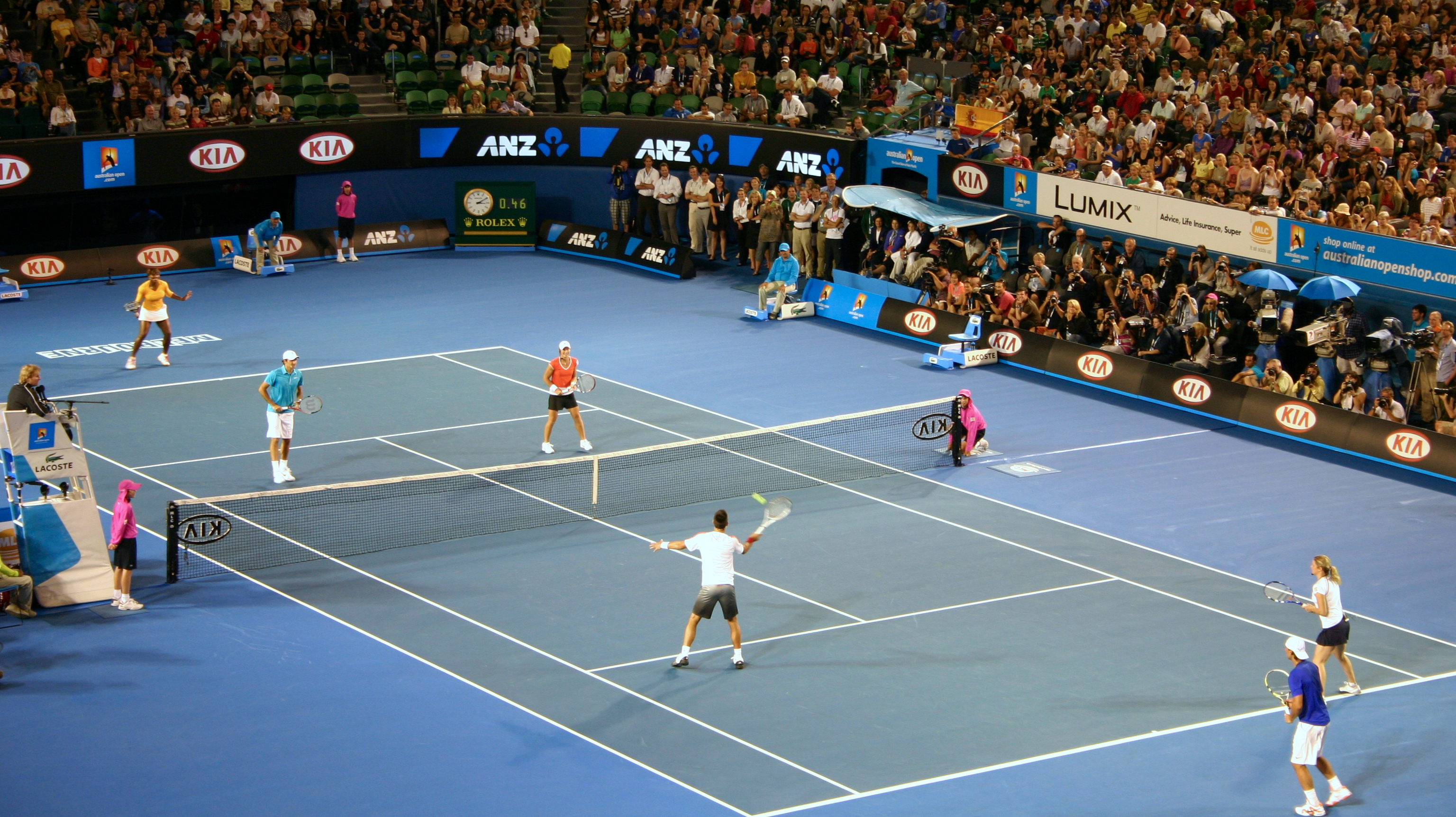
Triples play during the "Hit for Haiti" event

A day prior to the tournament, a charity match called Hit for Haiti was held to raise funds to aid victims of the 2010 Haiti earthquake. The event was proposed by Roger Federer, and was organised in under 24 hours. It was held in Rod Laver Arena at 2 pm and lasted about 90 minutes; tickets cost A$10 for adults and were free for children under 12. Nine players participated, in two teams (named after the colours in the Haitian flag). Team Red consisted of Roger Federer, Serena Williams, Lleyton Hewitt, and Samantha Stosur, and Team Blue was Rafael Nadal, Novak Djokovic, Andy Roddick, Kim Clijsters, and late substitute Bernard Tomic. Former player and current TV analyst Jim Courier served as the chair umpire. Players wore microphones during play, and competed in doubles, mixed doubles, and other arrangements. Team Red defeated Team Blue, 7–6. Additional donations were solicited at the event, and several other players – including Marcos Baghdatis and Maria Sharapova – donated money directly. An early count had at least A$159,000 raised; later reports put the figure around A$400,000.

== Day 1 (18 January) ==
The 2010 Australian Open started with inclement weather in southeastern Australia. Rain temporarily suspended play on the outer courts, allowing play on only Rod Laver Arena and Hisense Arena, which have retractable roofs. Play was able to begin on the outer courts approximately an hour later. The rain continued intermittently throughout the day, forcing some matches to be postponed until Day 2.

Men's singles play was started by Andy Roddick on the main courts as he defeated Thiemo de Bakker in straight sets 6–1, 6–4, 6–4. The fifth seed Andy Murray followed by beating qualifier Kevin Anderson 6–1, 6–1, 6–2. Fourth-seed Juan Martín del Potro took four sets to defeat American Michael Russell 6–4, 6–4, 3–6, 6–2. Australian Bernard Tomic prevailed in straight sets against qualifier Guillaume Rufin. Rafael Nadal won in his match against Peter Luczak 7–6(0), 6–1, 6–4, despite struggling in the first set. 13th-seed Radek Štěpánek lost to Ivo Karlović in a lengthy five set match, 2–6, 7–6(5), 6–4, 3–6, 6–4. Ivan Ljubičić and Fernando González made it to the next round. The match between Matthew Ebden and Gaël Monfils was suspended at 2–2(30–15).

World number 14 Maria Sharapova lost a 191-minute opening match with her former doubles partner, world number 58 Maria Kirilenko 7–6(4), 3–6, 6–4. This marked the first time since 2003 that Sharapova lost in the first round of a Grand Slam. The Belgian trio of Kim Clijsters, Justine Henin and Yanina Wickmayer all won their matches on the first day. Seeded players Flavia Pennetta and Kateryna Bondarenko also made it through. Spanish player María José Martínez Sánchez was the first to win, scoring a double bagel over Evgeniya Rodina. The match between eighth seed Jelena Janković and Monica Niculescu was suspended.

- Seeds out:
  - Men's singles: (Czech Republic) Radek Štěpánek
  - Women's singles: (Russia) Maria Sharapova

Matches on main courts
Matches on Rod Laver Arena
Event	Winner	Loser	Score
Women's Singles 1st Round	(Russia) Maria Kirilenko	(Russia) Maria Sharapova [14]	7–6(4), 3–6, 6–4
Women's Singles 1st Round	(Belgium) Kim Clijsters [15]	(Canada) Valérie Tétreault [Q]	6–0, 6–4
Men's Singles 1st Round	(United Kingdom) Andy Murray [4]	(South Africa) Kevin Anderson [Q]	6–1, 6–1, 6–2
Men's Singles 1st Round	(Spain) Rafael Nadal [2]	(Australia) Peter Luczak	7–6(0), 6–1, 6–4
Women's Singles 1st Round	(Russia) Alisa Kleybanova [27]	(Australia) Jelena Dokic	6–1, 7–5
Matches on Hisense Arena
Event	Winner	Loser	Score
Women's Singles 1st Round	(Russia) Dinara Safina [2]	(Slovakia) Magdaléna Rybáriková	6–4, 6–4
Men's Singles 1st Round	(United States) Andy Roddick [7]	(Netherlands) Thiemo de Bakker	6–1, 6–4, 6–4
Men's Singles 1st Round	(Argentina) Juan Martín del Potro [4]	(United States) Michael Russell	6–4, 6–4, 3–6, 6–2
Women's Singles 1st Round	(Belgium) Justine Henin [WC]	(Belgium) Kirsten Flipkens	6–4, 6–3
Women's Singles 1st Round	(Russia) Elena Dementieva [5]	(Russia) Vera Dushevina	6–2, 6–1
Matches on Margaret Court Arena
Event	Winner	Loser	Score
Women's Singles 1st Round	(Belgium) Yanina Wickmayer [Q]	(Romania) Alexandra Dulgheru	1–6, 7–5, 10–8
Men's Singles 1st Round	(Australia) Bernard Tomic [WC]	(France) Guillaume Rufin [Q]	6–3, 6–4, 6–4
Women's Singles 1st Round	(Serbia) Jelena Janković [8] vs. (Romania) Monica Niculescu		Cancelled
Men's Singles 1st Round	(Australia) Matthew Ebden [Q] vs. (France) Gaël Monfils [12]		2–2, (30–15), postponed
Coloured background indicates a night match.

== Day 2 (19 January) ==
Roger Federer defeated Igor Andreev 4–6, 6–2, 7–6(2), 6–0. Lleyton Hewitt also advanced soundly against Ricardo Hocevar, winning 6–1, 6–2, 6–3. Third-seeded and 2008 Australian Open champion Novak Djokovic defeated Daniel Gimeno-Traver, 7–5, 6–3, 6–2. The men's side saw many upsets, the largest of which was Robin Söderling's loss against Spaniard Marcel Granollers 5–7, 2–6, 6–4, 6–4, 6–2. American John Isner won his first match as a seeded player at a grand slam in a lengthy match against Andreas Seppi 6–3, 6–3, 3–6, 5–7, 6–4. Louk Sorensen became the first Irish player to advance to the second round of a Grand Slam in defeating Lu Yen-hsun 6–4, 3–6, 6–2, 6–1. Nikolay Davydenko won in straight sets and David Ferrer did not drop a single game against Frederico Gil before the Portugal native retired 6–0, 6–0, 2–0.

On the women's side, world number one Serena Williams defeated Urszula Radwańska 6–2, 6–1, and Australian Samantha Stosur won her match at Rod Laver Arena 6–1, 3–6, 6–2. Venus Williams, seeded sixth, also won her opening match 6–2, 6–2 over Lucie Šafářová. 18th seed Virginie Razzano and 25th seed Anabel Medina Garrigues both lost in straight sets, while 23rd seed Dominika Cibulková fell in three sets. Perhaps the most notable women's match of the day, however, involved two unseeded players. Barbora Záhlavová-Strýcová defeated Regina Kulikova 7–6(5), 6–7(10), 6–3 in a match that lasted 4 hours, 19 minutes—the longest women's match by time in a Grand Slam event in the open era, and believed to be the second-longest women's match ever. The record for longest women's match in a Grand Slam in the Open Era was later beaten, however, in next year's Australian Open.

- Seeds out:
  - Men's Singles: (Spain) Juan Carlos Ferrero, (Austria) Jürgen Melzer, (United States) Sam Querrey, (Spain) Tommy Robredo, (Sweden) Robin Söderling
  - Women's Singles: (Slovakia) Dominika Cibulková, (Spain) Anabel Medina Garrigues, (France) Virginie Razzano
- Schedule of Play

Matches on main courts
Matches on Rod Laver Arena
Event	Winner	Loser	Score
Women's Singles 1st Round	(Australia) Samantha Stosur [13]	(China) Han Xinyun	6–1, 3–6, 6–2
Women's Singles 1st Round	(United States) Serena Williams [1]	(Poland) Urszula Radwańska	6–2, 6–1
Men's Singles 1st Round	(Switzerland) Roger Federer [1]	(Russia) Igor Andreev	4–6, 6–2, 7–6(2), 6–0
Men's Singles 1st Round	(Australia) Lleyton Hewitt [22]	(Brazil) Ricardo Hocevar [Q]	6–1, 6–2, 6–3
Women's Singles 1st Round	(France) Julie Coin	(Australia) Alicia Molik	3–6, 7–6(4), 6–3
Matches on Hisense Arena
Event	Winner	Loser	Score
Men's Singles 1st Round	(Spain) Fernando Verdasco [9]	(Australia) Carsten Ball	6–7(4), 7–6(1), 7–5, 6–2
Women's Singles 1st Round	(Serbia) Jelena Janković [8]	(Romania) Monica Niculescu	6–4, 6–0
Men's Singles 1st Round	(France) Jo-Wilfried Tsonga [10]	(Ukraine) Sergiy Stakhovsky	6–3, 6–4, 6–4
Women's Singles 1st Round	(United States) Venus Williams [6]	(Czech Republic) Lucie Šafářová	6–2, 6–2
Men's Singles 1st Round	(Serbia) Novak Djokovic [3]	(Spain) Daniel Gimeno-Traver	7–5, 6–3, 6–2
Matches on Margaret Court Arena
Event	Winner	Loser	Score
Women's Singles 1st Round	(Serbia) Ana Ivanovic [20]	(United States) Shenay Perry	6–2, 6–3
Men's Singles 1st Round	(France) Gaël Monfils [12]	(Australia) Matthew Ebden [Q]	6–4, 6–4, 6–4
Women's Singles 1st Round	(Australia) Casey Dellacqua [WC]	(Belarus) Anastasiya Yakimova	6–2 3–6 6–4
Men's Singles 1st Round	(Cyprus) Marcos Baghdatis	(Italy) Paolo Lorenzi	6–2, 6–4, 6–4
Men's Singles 1st Round	(Russia) Mikhail Youzhny [20]	(France) Richard Gasquet	6–7(9), 4–6, 7–6(2), 7–6(4), 6–4
Coloured background indicates a night match.

== Day 3 (20 January) ==
In the second round, defending champion Rafael Nadal defeated Lukáš Lacko 6–2, 6–2, 6–2 and 2009 semifinalist Andy Roddick defeated Thomaz Bellucci 6–3, 6–4, 6–4. Andy Murray, Gaël Monfils, Fernando González, Stanislas Wawrinka and John Isner all followed through in straight sets, while Philipp Kohlschreiber and Ivan Ljubičić needed four sets to get through. Juan Martín del Potro survived against American James Blake 6–4, 6–7(3), 5–7, 6–3, 10–8 and Marin Čilić against Australian wildcard Bernard Tomic 6–7(6), 6–3, 4–6, 6–2, 6–4. 29th seed Victor Troicki fell to Florian Mayer and Tomáš Berdych to Evgeny Korolev.

On the women's side, Alyona Bondarenko won her match in straight sets, while her sister, Kateryna, lost in straight sets. Justine Henin defeated fifth seed Elena Dementieva 7–5, 7–6(6). Russians Dinara Safina, Svetlana Kuznetsova, Vera Zvonareva, Alisa Kleybanova, Nadia Petrova and Maria Kirilenko all recorded straight sets victories. They were joined by Kim Clijsters and Caroline Wozniacki, and Jelena Janković. Two other seeds also fell with 25th seed María José Martínez Sánchez and 28th seed Elena Vesnina. Flavia Pennetta was defeated by Yanina Wickmayer in straight sets.

- Seeds out:
  - Men's Singles: (Czech Republic) Tomáš Berdych, (Serbia) Viktor Troicki
  - Women's Singles: (Ukraine) Kateryna Bondarenko, (Spain) María José Martínez Sánchez, (Italy) Flavia Pennetta, (France) Aravane Rezaï, (Russia) Elena Vesnina, (Russia) Elena Dementieva
  - Men's Doubles: (Austria) Julian Knowle / (Sweden) Robert Lindstedt, (Czech Republic) Jaroslav Levinský / (United States) Travis Parrott, (Brazil) Marcelo Melo / (Brazil) Bruno Soares
- Schedule of Play

Matches on main courts
Matches on Rod Laver Arena
Event	Winner	Loser	Score
Women's Singles 2nd Round	(Russia) Svetlana Kuznetsova [3]	(Russia) Anastasia Pavlyuchenkova	6–2, 6–2
Women's Singles 2nd Round	(Belgium) Kim Clijsters [15]	(Thailand) Tamarine Tanasugarn	6–3, 6–3
Men's Singles 2nd Round	(Spain) Rafael Nadal [2]	(Slovakia) Lukáš Lacko	6–2, 6–2, 6–2
Women's Singles 2nd Round	(Belgium) Justine Henin [WC]	(Russia) Elena Dementieva [5]	7–5, 7–6(6)
Men's Singles 2nd Round	(Croatia) Marin Čilić [14]	(Australia) Bernard Tomic [WC]	6–7(6), 6–3, 4–6, 6–2, 6–4
Matches on Hisense Arena
Event	Winner	Loser	Score
Women's Singles 1st Round	(Denmark) Caroline Wozniacki [4]	(Canada) Aleksandra Wozniak	6–4, 6–2
Men's Singles 2nd Round	(United States) Andy Roddick [7]	(Brazil) Thomaz Bellucci	6–3, 6–4, 6–4
Women's Singles 2nd Round	(Russia) Dinara Safina [2]	(Czech Republic) Barbora Záhlavová-Strýcová	6–3, 6–4
Men's Singles 2nd Round	(Argentina) Juan Martín del Potro [4]	(United States) James Blake	6–4, 6–7(3), 5–7, 6–3, 10–8
Matches on Margaret Court Arena
Event	Winner	Loser	Score
Women's Singles 1st Round	(Sweden) Sofia Arvidsson [Q]	(Australia) Jarmila Groth [WC]	6–2, 4–6, 6–4
Women's Singles 2nd Round	(Belgium) Yanina Wickmayer [Q]	(Italy) Flavia Pennetta [12]	7–6(2), 6–1
Women's Doubles 1st Round	(United States) Serena Williams [2] (United States) Venus Williams [2]	(Australia) Sophie Ferguson (Australia) Jessica Moore	6–1, 6–1
Men's Singles 2nd Round	(France) Gaël Monfils [12]	(Croatia) Antonio Veić [Q]	6–4, 6–4, 6–4
Men's Singles 2nd Round	(United Kingdom) Andy Murray [4]	(France) Marc Gicquel	6–1, 6–4, 6–3
Coloured background indicates a night match.

== Day 4 (21 January) ==
Day 4 saw world number one Roger Federer, Lleyton Hewitt, 2009 semifinalist Fernando Verdasco, Jo-Wilfried Tsonga, Mikhail Youzhny and Nikolay Davydenko win in straight sets. 2008 champion Novak Djokovic needed four sets to advance. Five-set matches of the day consisted of Tommy Haas' defeat of Janko Tipsarević 4–6, 6–4, 6–3, 1–6, 6–3; Albert Montañés' defeat of Stéphane Robert 4–6, 6–7(3), 6–2, 6–3, 6–2; Nicolás Almagro's win over Benjamin Becker 6–4, 6–2, 3–6, 4–6, 6–3; Juan Mónaco's two-set recovery over Michaël Llodra 3–6, 3–6, 7–6(5), 6–1, 6–3; and Marcos Baghdatis' defeat of David Ferrer 4–6, 3–6, 7–6(4), 6–3, 6–1.

In the women's side the situation was the same as many seeds cruised through with Serena Williams and Venus Williams leading the way as they both won in straight sets. they were followed by Vera Zvonareva, good friends Caroline Wozniacki, Victoria Azarenka and Agnieszka Radwańska, Slovak Daniela Hantuchová, Francesca Schiavone, Shahar Pe'er and Carla Suárez Navarro. While Li Na survived against Ágnes Szávay in three sets. The two remaining Australian in the women's draw also won in straight sets as Samantha Stosur defeated Kristina Barrois 7–5, 6–3 and Wildcard Casey Dellacqua outlasting Karolina Šprem 7–6(4), 7–6(6). However two seeds fell as Sabine Lisicki fell in three to Alberta Brianti and former number one Ana Ivanovic also fell in three to Argentine Gisela Dulko 6–7(6), 7–5, 6–4 in an error filled match.

- Seeds out:
  - Men's Singles: (Spain) David Ferrer
  - Women's Singles: (Serbia) Ana Ivanovic, (Germany) Sabine Lisicki
  - Men's Doubles: (Czech Republic) František Čermák / (Slovakia) Michal Mertiňák, (India) Mahesh Bhupathi / (Belarus) Max Mirnyi, (France) Michaël Llodra / (Israel) Andy Ram, (Germany) Christopher Kas / (Belgium) Dick Norman
  - Women's Doubles: (Russia) Nadia Petrova / (Australia) Samantha Stosur
- Schedule of Play

Matches on main courts
Matches on Rod Laver Arena
Event	Winner	Loser	Score
Men's Singles 2nd Round	(Serbia) Novak Djokovic [3]	(Switzerland) Marco Chiudinelli	3–6, 6–1, 6–1, 6–3
Women's Singles 2nd Round	(Australia) Samantha Stosur [13]	(Germany) Kristina Barrois	7–5, 6–3
Men's Singles 2nd Round	(Australia) Lleyton Hewitt [22]	(United States) Donald Young	7–6(3), 6–4, 6–1
Men's Singles 2nd Round	(Switzerland) Roger Federer [1]	(Romania) Victor Hănescu	6–2, 6–3, 6–2
Women's Singles 2nd Round	(Australia) Casey Dellacqua [WC]	(Croatia) Karolina Šprem	7–6(4), 7–6(6)
Matches on Hisense Arena
Event	Winner	Loser	Score
Men's Singles 2nd Round	(Cyprus) Marcos Baghdatis	(Spain) David Ferrer [17]	4–6, 3–6, 7–6(4), 6–3, 6–1
Women's Singles 2nd Round	(United States) Venus Williams [6]	(Austria) Sybille Bammer	6–2, 7–5
Women's Singles 2nd Round	(United States) Serena Williams [1]	(Czech Republic) Petra Kvitová	6–2, 6–1
Men's Singles 2nd Round	(France) Jo-Wilfried Tsonga [10]	(United States) Taylor Dent	6–4, 6–3, 6–3
Matches on Margaret Court Arena
Event	Winner	Loser	Score
Women's Singles 2nd Round	(Argentina) Gisela Dulko	(Serbia) Ana Ivanovic [20]	6–7(6), 7–5, 6–4
Women's Singles 2nd Round	(Denmark) Caroline Wozniacki [4]	(Germany) Julia Görges	6–3, 6–1
Men's Singles 2nd Round	(Germany) Tommy Haas [18]	(Serbia) Janko Tipsarević	4–6, 6–4, 6–3, 1–6, 6–3
Men's Singles 2nd Round	(Spain) Fernando Verdasco [9]	(Ukraine) Ivan Sergeyev [Q]	6–1, 6–2, 6–2
Coloured background indicates a night match.

== Day 5 (22 January) ==
7th seed Andy Roddick won a three-hour match against Feliciano López 6–7(4), 6–4, 6–4, 7–6(3). fourth seed Juan Martín del Potro defeated Florian Mayer 6–3, 0–6 6–4, 7–5. 14th seed Marin Čilić beat 19th seed Stanislas Wawrinka 4–6, 6–4, 6–3, 6–3. Rafael Nadal, the defending champion, lost a set in his victory against Philipp Kohlschreiber 6–4, 6–2, 2–6, 7–5. Ivo Karlović defeated 24th seed compatriot Ivan Ljubičić 6–3, 3–6, 6–3, 7–6(7). Andy Murray won in straight sets over Florent Serra. Chilean Fernando González beat Evgeny Korolev 6–7(5), 6–3, 1–6, 6–3, 6–4. The day's most significant upset was 33rd seed John Isner's defeat of 12th seed Gaël Monfils 6–1, 4–6, 7–6(4), 7–6(5).

In the women's draw world, 2009 runner-up Dinara Safina defeated Elena Baltacha 6–1, 6–2 in 57 minutes. Belgian Yanina Wickmayer needed three sets to defeat Sara Errani 6–1, 6–7(4), 6–3. Maria Kirilenko advanced to the fourth round with a tight win over Roberta Vinci 7–5, 7–6(4). Svetlana Kuznetsova also made it through but struggled against German qualifier Angelique Kerber 3–6, 7–5, 6–4. Alisa Kleybanova lost to Justine Henin in three sets 3–6, 6–4, 6–2. China's Zheng Jie upset 11th seed Marion Bartoli in three sets 5–7, 6–3, 6–0. Alyona Bondarenko won her first match over eighth seed Jelena Janković 6–2, 6–3. Nadia Petrova defeated 15th seed Kim Clijsters 6–0, 6–1.

- Seeds out:
  - Men's Singles: (France) Gaël Monfils, (Germany) Philipp Kohlschreiber, (Croatia) Ivan Ljubičić, (Switzerland) Stanislas Wawrinka
  - Women's Singles: (Serbia) Jelena Janković, (Russia) Alisa Kleybanova, (France) Marion Bartoli, (Belgium) Kim Clijsters
  - Men's Doubles: (Spain) Marcel Granollers / (Spain) Tommy Robredo, (Poland) Mariusz Fyrstenberg / (Poland) Marcin Matkowski, (Czech Republic) Martin Damm / (Slovakia) Filip Polášek
  - Women's Doubles: (Chinese Taipei) Chuang Chia-jung / (Czech Republic) Květa Peschke, (Czech Republic) Iveta Benešová / (Czech Republic) Barbora Záhlavová-Strýcová
  - Mixed Doubles: (Spain) Nuria Llagostera Vives / (Slovakia) Michal Mertiňák
- Schedule of Play

Matches on main courts
Matches on Rod Laver Arena
Event	Winner	Loser	Score
Women's Singles 3rd Round	(Russia) Dinara Safina [2]	(United Kingdom) Elena Baltacha	6–1, 6–2
Men's Singles 3rd Round	(United States) Andy Roddick [7]	(Spain) Feliciano López	6–7(4), 6–4, 6–4, 7–6(3)
Men's Singles 3rd Round	(Argentina) Juan Martín del Potro [4]	(Germany) Florian Mayer	6–3, 0–6, 6–4, 7–5
Men's Singles 3rd Round	(Spain) Rafael Nadal [2]	(Germany) Philipp Kohlschreiber [27]	6–4, 6–2, 2–6, 7–5
Women's Singles 3rd Round	(Russia) Svetlana Kuznetsova [3]	(Germany) Angelique Kerber [Q]	3–6, 7–5, 6–4
Matches on Hisense Arena
Event	Winner	Loser	Score
Women's Singles 3rd Round	(Ukraine) Alyona Bondarenko [31]	(Serbia) Jelena Janković [8]	6–2, 6–3
Women's Singles 3rd Round	(Belgium) Justine Henin [WC]	(Russia) Alisa Kleybanova [27]	3–6, 6–4, 6–2
Men's Singles 3rd Round	(United Kingdom) Andy Murray [5]	(France) Florent Serra	7–5, 6–1, 6–4
Women's Singles 3rd Round	(Russia) Nadia Petrova [19]	(Belgium) Kim Clijsters [15]	6–0, 6–1
Men's Singles 3rd Round	(Croatia) Ivo Karlović	(Croatia) Ivan Ljubičić [25]	6–3, 3–6, 6–3, 7–6(7)
Matches on Margaret Court Arena
Event	Winner	Loser	Score
Men's Doubles 2nd Round	(Germany) Philipp Marx (Slovakia) Igor Zelenay	(Australia) Rameez Junaid [WC] (Australia) Peter Luczak [WC]	7–6(5), 6–4
Women's Singles 3rd Round	(Belgium) Yanina Wickmayer [Q]	(Italy) Sara Errani	6–1, 6–7(4), 6–3
Men's Singles 3rd Round	(United States) John Isner [33]	(France) Gaël Monfils [12]	6–1, 4–6, 7–6(4), 7–6(5)
Men's Singles 3rd Round	(Croatia) Marin Čilić [14]	(Switzerland) Stanislas Wawrinka [19]	4–6, 6–4, 6–3, 6–3
Coloured background indicates a night match.

== Day 6 (23 January) ==
Day 6 began with the announcement that 20th seed Mikhail Youzhny was withdrawing from his third round encounter with Łukasz Kubot due to a right wrist injury. First, Roger Federer defeated the 31st seed, Spaniard Albert Montañés 6–3, 6–4, 6–4. Novak Djokovic won his match against Denis Istomin 6–1, 6–1, 6–2 in 97 minutes. Thirtieth seed Juan Mónaco was defeated by Russian sixth seed Nikolay Davydenko 6–0, 6–3, 6–4. Nicolás Almagro, the 26th seed, won in straight sets over Alejandro Falla. 10th seed Jo-Wilfried Tsonga prevailed over Tommy Haas 4 6–4, 3–6, 6–1, 7–5 after coming back from a 3–5 deficit in the fourth set. Stefan Koubek retired due to a fever against Fernando Verdasco after losing the first set 6–1. The encounter between Australian Lleyton Hewitt and Cypriot Marcos Baghdatis ended with a retirement from the latter at 6–0, 4–2, due to a shoulder pain.

Australian hopeful Samantha Stosur defeated Italian Alberta Brianti 6–4, 6–1. Victoria Azarenka and Caroline Wozniacki cruised through against Tathiana Garbin and Shahar Pe'er respectively, both winning in straight sets. Ninth seed Vera Zvonareva had an easy first set but struggled in the second against Gisela Dulko 6–1, 7–5. Sixth seed Venus Williams ended the comeback of Australian wildcard Casey Dellacqua in straight sets 6–1, 7–6(4). Top seed and defending champion Serena Williams defeated Carla Suárez Navarro 6–0, 6–3. 16th seed Li Na prevailed over 22nd seed Daniela Hantuchová 7–5, 3–6, 6–2. The only upset in the women's side occurred with Italian 17th seed Francesca Schiavone's straight set win over Polish 10th seed Agnieszka Radwańska 6–2, 6–2.

- Seeds out:
  - Men's Singles: (Russia) Mikhail Youzhny, (Spain) Albert Montañés, (Argentina) Juan Mónaco, (Germany) Tommy Haas
  - Women's Singles: (Spain) Carla Suárez Navarro, (Poland) Agnieszka Radwańska, (Slovakia) Daniela Hantuchová, (Israel) Shahar Pe'er
  - Women's Doubles: (Germany) Anna-Lena Grönefeld / (United States) Vania King
- Schedule of Play

Matches on main courts
Matches on Rod Laver Arena
Event	Winner	Loser	Score
Women's Singles 3rd Round	(Australia) Samantha Stosur [13]	(Italy) Alberta Brianti	6–4, 6–1
Men's Singles 3rd Round	(Switzerland) Roger Federer [1]	(Spain) Albert Montañés [31]	6–3, 6–4, 6–4
Women's Singles 3rd Round	(United States) Venus Williams [6]	(Australia) Casey Dellacqua [WC]	6–1, 7–6
Men's Singles 3rd Round	(Australia) Lleyton Hewitt [22]	(Cyprus) Marcos Baghdatis	6–0, 4–2, ret.
Women's Singles 3rd Round	(Denmark) Caroline Wozniacki [4]	(Israel) Shahar Pe'er [29]	6–4, 6–0
Matches on Hisense Arena
Event	Winner	Loser	Score
Women's Singles 3rd Round	(Belarus) Victoria Azarenka [7]	(Italy) Tathiana Garbin	6–0, 6–2
Women's Singles 3rd Round	(United States) Serena Williams [1]	(Spain) Carla Suárez Navarro [32]	6–0, 6–3
Men's Singles 3rd Round	(Serbia) Novak Djokovic [3]	(Uzbekistan) Denis Istomin	6–1, 6–1, 6–2
Men's Singles 3rd Round	(France) Jo-Wilfried Tsonga [10]	(Germany) Tommy Haas [18]	6–4, 3–6, 6–1, 7–5
Legends' Doubles	(France) Henri Leconte (Australia) Patrick Rafter	(Australia) Scott Draper (Australia) Richard Fromberg	6–7(3), 6–2, [10–3]
Matches on Margaret Court Arena
Event	Winner	Loser	Score
Women's Singles 3rd Round	(Russia) Vera Zvonareva [9]	(Argentina) Gisela Dulko	6–1, 7–5
Men's Singles 3rd Round	(Russia) Nikolay Davydenko [6]	(Argentina) Juan Mónaco [30]	6–0, 6–3, 6–4
Men's Singles 3rd Round	(Spain) Fernando Verdasco [9]	(Austria) Stefan Koubek [Q]	6–1, ret.
Mixed Doubles 1st Round	(Russia) Alisa Kleybanova [6] (Belarus) Max Mirnyi [6]	(Australia) Anastasia Rodionova (Australia) Paul Hanley	6–3, 3–6, 10–3
Mixed Doubles 1st Round	(Czech Republic) Lucie Hradecká (Czech Republic) František Čermák	(Australia) Casey Dellacqua [WC] (Australia) Jordan Kerr [WC]	3–6, 6–2, 10–8
Coloured background indicates a night match.

== Day 7 (24 January) ==
The day began with Andy Murray's defeat of American John Isner 7–6(4), 6–3, 6–2. They were followed by defending champion Rafael Nadal and Ivo Karlović, where Nadal prevailed in four sets 6–4, 4–6, 6–4, 6–4. Marin Čilić defeated defending US Open Champion Juan Martín del Potro 5–7, 6–4, 7–5, 5–7, 6–3 to advance to the quarterfinals. The last match of the day saw Andy Roddick defeat Fernando González 6–3, 3–6, 4–6, 7–5, 6–2.

In the women's side, Chinese Zheng Jie took on Ukrainian Alyona Bondarenko, where Zheng won 7–6(5), 6–4. 19th seed Nadia Petrova took on third seed Svetlana Kuznetsova and won 6–3, 3–6, 6–1. Belgian Justine Henin took on compatriot Yanina Wickmayer 7–6(3), 1–6, 6–3. Dinara Safina retired against Maria Kirilenko 4–5 (30–40) due to a recurring back problem.

- Seeds out:
  - Men's Singles: (United States) John Isner, (Argentina) Juan Martín del Potro, (Chile) Fernando González
  - Women's Singles: (Ukraine) Alyona Bondarenko, (Russia) Svetlana Kuznetsova, (Russia) Dinara Safina
  - Women's Doubles: (Russia) Alla Kudryavtseva / (Russia) Ekaterina Makarova, (Chinese Taipei) Hsieh Su-wei / (China) Peng Shuai, (India) Sania Mirza / (Spain) Virginia Ruano Pascual
- Schedule of Play

Matches on main courts
Matches on Rod Laver Arena
Event	Winner	Loser	Score
Men's Singles 4th Round	(United Kingdom) Andy Murray [5]	(United States) John Isner [33]	7–6(4), 6–3, 6–2
Men's Singles 4th Round	(Spain) Rafael Nadal [2]	(Croatia) Ivo Karlović	6–4, 4–6, 6–4, 6–4
Women's Singles 4th Round	(Belgium) Justine Henin [WC]	(Belgium) Yanina Wickmayer [Q]	7–6(3), 1–6, 6–3
Men's Singles 4th Round	(United States) Andy Roddick [7]	(Chile) Fernando González [11]	6–3, 3–6, 4–6, 7–5, 6–2
Matches on Hisense Arena
Event	Winner	Loser	Score
Women's Singles 4th Round	(China) Zheng Jie	(Ukraine) Alyona Bondarenko [31]	7–6(5), 6–4
Women's Singles 4th Round	(Russia) Nadia Petrova [19]	(Russia) Svetlana Kuznetsova [3]	6–3, 3–6, 6–1
Men's Singles 4th Round	(Croatia) Marin Čilić [14]	(Argentina) Juan Martín del Potro [4]	5–7, 6–4, 7–5, 5–7, 6–3
Women's Singles 4th Round	(Russia) Maria Kirilenko	(Russia) Dinara Safina [2]	5–4, ret.

== Day 8 (25 January) ==
Venus Williams reached the Women's Singles Quarterfinals after defeating Francesca Schiavone 3–6, 6–2, 6–1. Williams will proceed against Li Na who defeated US-Open finalist Caroline Wozniacki 6–4, 6–3. Titleholder Serena Williams was successful against Australian Samantha Stosur, making Victoria Azarenka her next combatant.

Men's Singles ranking number 1 Roger Federer won against Lleyton Hewitt 6–2, 6–3, 6–4 in a continuously one-sided match. Novak Djokovic defeated Łukasz Kubot 6–1, 6–2, 7–5, having reached the Men's Singles Quarterfinals. The longest matches of the day were presented by Nikolay Davydenko who beat Fernando Verdasco and Nicolás Almagro defeated by Jo-Wilfried Tsonga in both five sets.

- Seeds out:
  - Men's Singles: (Spain) Fernando Verdasco, (Australia) Lleyton Hewitt, (Spain) Nicolás Almagro
  - Women's Singles: (Italy) Francesca Schiavone, (Denmark) Caroline Wozniacki, (Australia) Samantha Stosur, (Russia) Vera Zvonareva
  - Men's Doubles: (Sweden) Simon Aspelin / (Australia) Paul Hanley
  - Women's Doubles: (Russia) Elena Vesnina / (China) Zheng Jie, (Spain) Nuria Llagostera Vives / (Spain) María José Martínez Sánchez
  - Mixed Doubles: (Slovakia) Daniela Hantuchová / (Canada) Daniel Nestor, (Russia) Alisa Kleybanova / (Belarus) Max Mirnyi, (United States) Bethanie Mattek-Sands / (United States) Bob Bryan, (Russia) Maria Kirilenko / (Serbia) Nenad Zimonjić
- Schedule of Play

Matches on main courts
Matches on Rod Laver Arena
Event	Winner	Loser	Score
Women's Singles 4th Round	(United States) Venus Williams [6]	(Italy) Francesca Schiavone [17]	3–6, 6–2, 6–1
Men's Singles 4th Round	(Russia) Nikolay Davydenko [6]	(Spain) Fernando Verdasco [9]	6–2, 7–5, 4–6, 6–7(5), 6–3
Women's Singles 4th Round	(United States) Serena Williams [1]	(Australia) Samantha Stosur [13]	6–4, 6–2
Men's Singles 4th Round	(Switzerland) Roger Federer [1]	(Australia) Lleyton Hewitt [22]	6–2, 6–3, 6–4
Women's Singles 4th Round	(Belarus) Victoria Azarenka [7]	(Russia) Vera Zvonareva [9]	4–6, 6–4, 6–0
Matches on Hisense Arena
Event	Winner	Loser	Score
Mixed Doubles 2nd Round	(Italy) Flavia Pennetta (Brazil) Marcelo Melo	(Australia) Jarmila Groth (Australia) Samuel Groth	6–2, 6–3
Women's Singles 4th Round	(China) Li Na [16]	(Denmark) Caroline Wozniacki [4]	6–4, 6–3
Men's Singles 4th Round	(Serbia) Novak Djokovic [3]	(Poland) Łukasz Kubot	6–1, 6–2, 7–5
Men's Singles 4th Round	(France) Jo-Wilfried Tsonga [10]	(Spain) Nicolás Almagro [26]	6–3, 6–4, 4–6, 6–7(6), 9–7
Coloured background indicates a night match.

== Day 9 (26 January) ==
In the first Quarterfinal match of the men's side saw Marin Čilić taking on Andy Roddick. In the first set the two players exchange break at 5–5 to go to a tie-break which Čilić won. After the first set Roddick received a medical treatment to his neck. In the second set Čilić broke at 3–2 to lead 4–2 after Roddick received a medical treatment once again and then Čilić closed it out 6–3. In the third set Roddick broke in the second game and close it out 6–3 in the third. Roddick then led 4–0 in the fourth with two breaks and closed it out 6–2 to go to a decider. In the fifth set Roddick had three break opportunities in the first game but was not able to convert. Čilić then broke at the fourth game and close the match out 6–3 in the decider. The second quarterfinal was between Rafael Nadal and Andy Murray In the first set Nadal broke early to lead 2–1 but Murray broke back immediately to bring it to 2–2. Murray then won the next three games to lead 5–2 and then close it out 6–3 in the first. In the second set Nadal led 4–2 with a break but Murray once again broke back immediately to 4–3 and then it stayed on serve to go to a tie-break which Murray won 7–2. In the third set Murray led 3–0 when Nadal retired due to Knee Injury.

In the first Quarterfinal match of the women's side saw Justine Henin and Nadia Petrova. In the first set Henin broke to lead 3–2 but Petrova broke back at the eighth game to put it 4–4. Henin then served for the set at 5–4 but was broken back then it went to a tie-break, which Henin won 7–3. In the second set Petrova led 3–0 with two service break but let Henin back in as Henin broke back to lead 4–3. They then stayed on serve until the 12th game where Henin broke the Petrova serve to win the set 7–5 and the match. The match was followed by an encounter between Maria Kirilenko and Zheng Jie. The first set went lopsided as Zheng won five straight games after 1–1 to take the set 6–1. Kirilenko then received treatment for her leg after the first set. In the second set Zheng broke immediately in the first game to lead 1–0 and then stayed on serve to 5–3. At the 10th game Kirilenko double faulted at match point to give Zheng the match 6–1 6–3.

- Seeds out:
  - Men's Singles: (United States) Andy Roddick, (Spain) Rafael Nadal
  - Women's Singles: (Russia) Nadia Petrova
  - Men's Doubles: (Poland) Łukasz Kubot / (Austria) Oliver Marach
  - Women's Doubles: (United States) Bethanie Mattek-Sands / (China) Yan Zi
- Schedule of Play

Matches on main courts
Matches on Rod Laver Arena
Event	Winner	Loser	Score
Women's Singles Quarterfinals	(Belgium) Justine Henin [WC]	(Russia) Nadia Petrova [19]	7–6(3), 7–5
Women's Singles Quarterfinals	(China) Zheng Jie	(Russia) Maria Kirilenko	6–1, 6–3
Men's Singles Quarterfinals	(Croatia) Marin Čilić [14]	(United States) Andy Roddick [7]	7–6(4), 6–3, 3–6, 2–6, 6–3
Men's Singles Quarterfinals	(United Kingdom) Andy Murray [5]	(Spain) Rafael Nadal [2]	6–3, 7–6(4), 3–0, ret.
Men's Doubles Quarterfinals	(United States) Bob Bryan [1] (United States) Mike Bryan [1]	(United States) Eric Butorac (United States) Rajeev Ram	7–5, 4–6, 7–6(2)
Coloured background indicates a night match.

== Day 10 (27 January) ==
Day 10 of the Men's side saw world number one Roger Federer taking on Nikolay Davydenko. The first set went the Russian's way as he broke the Federer serve at the third and fifth game and won the set 6–2. He then made a 3–1 leverage and had break point for 4–1 but failed as Federer held for 2–3. From then on Davydenko's unforced errors rose greatly. Federer took advantage and won 13 straight games to take the second set 6–3 and the third 6–0. At 2–1 in the fourth, Davydenko went back to 3–3 but lost serve to go down 5–6 and Federer closed it out to take the set 7–5 and the match. The last Quarterfinal of the day featured 2008 Australian Open finalists Novak Djokovic and Jo-Wilfried Tsonga. In the first set both players broke each other for 2–1 Djokovic. Djokovic then broke in the sixth game and serve for the set at 5–3 but Tsonga crawled back in to push it to a tie-break, which he won 10–8. In the second Djokovic broke in the first game but gave it right back as he was broken in the eighth game, they then went again to tie-break which Djokovic won 7–5. the third set was dominated by Djokovic winning it 6–1 even though he looked like he was struggling. Tsonga then took advantage of his wounded opponent as he convincingly won the next two set 6–3 6–1 to have a clash with Federer in the semifinals.

The second Quarterfinal day of the Women' side saw Venus Williams taking on Li Na first. The first set saw Venus take the first four games, However Li got one of the breaks back to go 2–4. Venus then took the next two games to take the set 6–2. In the second set Venus took command as she led 2–0. Then both players traded break 4–2 Venus. Venus the served for the match at 5–4 but Li broke back to 5–5 then it went to a tie-break which Li won 7–4. Venus then took the first game and then six successive breaks happened to push it to 4–3 Venus. Li then held serve after saving break point to go four all. At that point three successive breaks then transpired as Li served it out to win the set 7–5 and the match to join compatriot Zheng Jie in the Semifinals. The next match saw defending champion Serena Williams taking on Victoria Azarenka. In the first set Serena suffered her first broken service game of the tournament as she was broken in the first game. Both then held serve after cancelling break point to go 2–1 Azarenka. Serena then broke back to level it at 2–2. Azarenka then took the next three games to take a commanding 5–2 lead breaking Serena twice more. Serena then fought back getting one of the break back to go 4–5 down, but Azarenka was able to take the set 6–4. In the second set Azarenka took a commanding 4–0 lead. Azarenka appeared to be in cruise control for advancing to the semifinals, but Serena muscled her way back to take five straight games, to take the lead 5–4. And then it went to a tie-break, which Serena won 7–4. Azarenka then held serve to 1–0 but Serena then took the next five games to lead 5–1 and closed it out 6–2 to meet Li in the semifinals.

- Seeds out:
  - Men's Singles: (Serbia) Novak Djokovic, (Russia) Nikolay Davydenko
  - Women's Singles: (United States) Venus Williams, (Belarus) Victoria Azarenka
  - Men's Doubles: (Czech Republic) Lukáš Dlouhý / (India) Leander Paes
  - Women's Doubles: (Russia) Alisa Kleybanova / (Italy) Francesca Schiavone
  - Mixed Doubles: (Russia) Elena Vesnina / (Israel) Andy Ram
- Schedule of Play

Matches on main courts
Matches on Rod Laver Arena
Event	Winner	Loser	Score
Women's Singles Quarterfinals	(China) Li Na [16]	(United States) Venus Williams [6]	2–6, 7–6(4), 7–5
Women's Singles Quarterfinals	(United States) Serena Williams [1]	(Belarus) Victoria Azarenka [7]	4–6, 7–6(4), 6–2
Men's Singles Quarterfinals	(Switzerland) Roger Federer [1]	(Russia) Nikolay Davydenko [6]	2–6, 6–3, 6–0, 7–5
Men's Singles Quarterfinals	(France) Jo-Wilfried Tsonga [10]	(Serbia) Novak Djokovic [3]	7–6(8), 6–7(5), 1–6, 6–3, 6–1
Coloured background indicates a night match.

== Day 11 (28 January) ==
In the men's action Andy Murray took on Marin Čilić. In the first set saw Čilić taking the first break as he broke in the fifth game. He then took a 5–3 lead and broke the Murray serve to win the set 6–3. In the second set Murray broke the Čilić serve at the fifth game and stayed on serve to win the set 6–4. In the third set Murray won the only break of the set at the seventh game and closed it out 6–4 to take a 2–1 lead. In the fourth set it was 1–1 until Murray won four straight games and closed out the match by winning the fourth set 6–2 to advance to his second Grand Slam final.

The Women's singles semifinals saw Chinese players Li Na and Zheng Jie taking defending champion Serena Williams and Justine Henin respectively. First on court was world number one and defending champion Serena Williams taking on Li Na, with Li just having beaten Venus Williams. In the first set, Serena broke at the first game to take a 1–0 lead. From then on it stayed on serve, however Serena was not able to close it out at 5–4 as Li broke to level it to 5–5. It then head into a tie-break, which Serena won 7–4, with a second serve ace. The second set recorded no breaks of serve as both players faced break points. It then went to a tie-break. Serena then won the tie-break 7–1 with once again an ace. In the second semi-finals were two unseeded players clashed as Justine Henin took on Zheng Jie. This match was lopsided from 1–1 as Henin took 11 straight games to win the match 6–1 6–0 to advance to her second straight final.

- Seeds out:
  - Men's Singles: (Croatia) Marin Čilić
  - Women's Singles: (China) Li Na
  - Women's Doubles: (Russia) Maria Kirilenko / (Poland) Agnieszka Radwańska, (United States) Lisa Raymond / (Australia) Rennae Stubbs
- Schedule of Play

Matches on main courts
Matches on Rod Laver Arena
Event	Winner	Loser	Score
Men's Doubles Semifinals	(Canada) Daniel Nestor [2] (Serbia) Nenad Zimonjić [2]	(Croatia) Ivo Karlović (Serbia) Dušan Vemić	6–4, 6–4
Women's Singles Semifinals	(United States) Serena Williams [1]	(China) Li Na [16]	7–6(4), 7–6(1)
Women's Singles Semifinals	(Belgium) Justine Henin	(China) Zheng Jie	6–1, 6–0
Men's Singles Semifinals	(United Kingdom) Andy Murray [5]	(Croatia) Marin Čilić [14]	3–6, 6–4, 6–4, 6–2
Exhibition Doubles – Finals	(Australia) Wayne Arthurs (Australia) Pat Cash	(France) Henri Leconte (Australia) Patrick Rafter	6–2, 2–6, [10–4]
Coloured background indicates a night match.

== Day 12 (29 January) ==
Roger Federer won in the match with Jo-Wilfried Tsonga, the 2008 finalist, 6–2, 6–3, 6–2. This marks the fifth time Federer made the final at the Australian Open.

Serena and Venus Williams won in the final against Cara Black and Liezel Huber 6–4, 6–3. The Australian Open women's doubles title in 2010 gives them back-to-back championships, and four overall in doubles at this slam. This was the eleventh women's Grand Slam doubles title of their careers.

- Seeds out:
  - Men's Singles: (France) Jo-Wilfried Tsonga
  - Women's Doubles: (Zimbabwe) Cara Black / (United States) Liezel Huber
  - Mixed Doubles: (United States) Lisa Raymond / (South Africa) Wesley Moodie
- Schedule of Play

Matches on main courts
Matches on Rod Laver Arena
Event	Winner	Loser	Score
Women's Doubles Final	(United States) Serena Williams [2] (United States) Venus Williams [2]	(Zimbabwe) Cara Black [1] (United States) Liezel Huber [1]	6–4, 6–3
Mixed Doubles Semifinal	(Russia) Ekaterina Makarova (Czech Republic) Jaroslav Levinský	(Italy) Flavia Pennetta (Brazil) Marcelo Melo	6–0, 4–6, [10–8]
Men's Singles Semifinal	(Switzerland) Roger Federer [1]	(France) Jo-Wilfried Tsonga [10]	6–2, 6–3, 6–2
Coloured background indicates a night match.

== Day 13 (30 January) ==
World Number One and defending champion Serena Williams and wildcard entrant Justine Henin met in the first grand slam final played between the two, with Serena leading their head-to-head 7–6. Both players then held serve for 2–1 with Serena saving three break points in two games. Serena then broke at the fourth game and held serve to take a 4–1 lead again saving break points. Henin then got the break back at the seventh game to take it to 4–4. It then stayed on serve to go 5–4 Serena, however Serena was able to break at the second opportunity to win the set 6–4. In the second set, both players traded breaks at the third and fourth game to level it 2–2. Serena then held serve to lead 3–2, and then Henin won the next four games and 10 straight points from 3–3 deuce to win the set 6–3. In the decider both players once again traded breaks at the third and fourth game to level it to 2–2. The defending champion then won the next four games and closed it out in her second championship point to win the set 6–2, which gave Serena her fifth Australian Open title. This was a record breaking fifth Australian Open title for Serena, which broke the tie she shared with Margaret Court, Evonne Goolagong, Steffi Graf, and Monica Seles who all won four Australian Open titles in the Open Era. In addition, this title increased her slam total to 12, which tied the overall fifth place mark by Billie Jean King and Suzanne Lenglen, which makes Serena the fourth most decorated grand slam champion in the open era of women's tennis. Serena was the first woman to win back-to-back titles since Jennifer Capriati did so back in 2001–02.

The Bryan brothers won their fourth title in men's doubles by winning over the team of Daniel Nestor and Nenad Zimonjić in three sets by a score of 6–3, 6–7(5), 6–3.

Boys' and girls' singles competition concluded. Brazilian Tiago Fernandes defeated Sean Berman 7–5, 6–3 in the boys' singles final. In the girls' single final Karolína Plíšková from the Czech Republic avenged the defeat of her twin sister, winning 6–1, 7–6(5), against British player Laura Robson.

- Seeds out:
  - Men's Doubles: (Canada) Daniel Nestor / (Serbia) Nenad Zimonjić
- Schedule of Play

Matches on main courts
Matches on Rod Laver Arena
Event	Champion	Runner up	Score
Junior Boys' Singles Final	(Brazil) Tiago Fernandes [14]	(Australia) Sean Berman [WC]	7–5, 6–3
Junior Girls' Singles Final	(Czech Republic) Karolína Plíšková [6]	(United Kingdom) Laura Robson	6–1, 7–6(5)
Women's Singles Final	(United States) Serena Williams [1]	(Belgium) Justine Henin [WC]	6–4, 3–6, 6–2
Men's Doubles Final	(United States) Bob Bryan [1] (United States) Mike Bryan [1]	(Canada) Daniel Nestor [2] (Serbia) Nenad Zimonjić [2]	6–3, 6–7(5), 6–3
Coloured background indicates a night match.

== Day 14 (31 January) ==
India's Leander Paes and Zimbabwe's Cara Black won the mixed doubles title against the pair of Ekaterina Makarova of Russia and the Czech Republic's Jaroslav Levinský in straight sets 7–5, 6–3. This was Paes's 11th doubles Grand Slam title, and the pair's second together after the 2008 US Open.

In the men's final, Roger Federer defeated Andy Murray to win his 16th Grand Slam title and increase his own record. It was also his fourth Australian Open title, which tied him with Andre Agassi in most titles won in the Open Era. Federer took the first and second sets with one break in each. In the third set, Federer fought back from 2–5 down to send the set into a tiebreaker. He went on to defeat Murray in a protracted third-set tiebreaker 6–3, 6–4, 7–6(11).

- Seeds out:
  - Men's Singles: (United Kingdom) Andy Murray
- Schedule of Play

Matches on main courts
Matches on Rod Laver Arena
Event	Champion	Runner up	Score
Mixed Doubles Final	(Zimbabwe) Cara Black [1] (India) Leander Paes [1]	(Russia) Ekaterina Makarova (Czech Republic) Jaroslav Levinský	7–5, 6–3
Men's Singles Final	(Switzerland) Roger Federer [1]	(United Kingdom) Andy Murray [5]	6–3, 6–4, 7–6(11)
Coloured background indicates a night match.
