= 2010 Australian Open – Men's doubles =

Men's doubles
- 2010 Australian Open

Final
- Champion: (United States) Bob Bryan (United States) Mike Bryan
- Runner-up: (Canada) Daniel Nestor (Serbia) Nenad Zimonjić
- Score: 6–3, 6–7^{(5–7)}, 6–3

Details
- Draw: 64
- Seeds: 16

Events
Singles	men	women		boys	girls
Doubles	men	women	mixed	boys	girls
WC Singles	men	women	quad
WC Doubles	men	women	quad
Legends	men	women	mixed
- Australian Open

Defending champions Bob and Mike Bryan defeated Daniel Nestor and Nenad Zimonjić in the final, 6–3, 6–7^{(5–7)}, 6–3 to win the men's doubles tennis title at the 2010 Australian Open.

== Seeds ==
1. (United States) Bob Bryan / (United States) Mike Bryan (champions)
2. (Canada) Daniel Nestor / (Serbia) Nenad Zimonjić (final)
3. (Czech Republic) Lukáš Dlouhý / (India) Leander Paes (quarterfinals)
4. (India) Mahesh Bhupathi / (Belarus) Max Mirnyi (first round)
5. (Poland) Łukasz Kubot / (Austria) Oliver Marach (third round)
6. (Czech Republic) František Čermák / (Slovakia) Michal Mertiňák (first round)
7. (Poland) Mariusz Fyrstenberg / (Poland) Marcin Matkowski (second round)
8. (Spain) Marcel Granollers / (Spain) Tommy Robredo (second round)
9. (Germany) Christopher Kas / (Belgium) Dick Norman (first round)
10. (Austria) Julian Knowle / (Sweden) Robert Lindstedt (first round)
11. (Sweden) Simon Aspelin / (Australia) Paul Hanley (third round)
12. (Brazil) Marcelo Melo / (Brazil) Bruno Soares (first round)
13. (France) Michaël Llodra / (Israel) Andy Ram (first round)
14. (Czech Republic) Martin Damm / (Slovakia) Filip Polášek (second round)
15. (Czech Republic) Jaroslav Levinský / (United States) Travis Parrott (first round)
16. (United States) James Blake / (United States) Mardy Fish (withdrew)
17. (Austria) Jürgen Melzer / (Germany) Philipp Petzschner (third round)

== Draw ==
Key

- Q = Qualifier
- WC = Wild card
- LL = Lucky loser
- Alt = Alternate
- ITF = ITF entry
- PR = Protected ranking
- SR = Special ranking
- SE = Special exempt
- JE = Junior exempt
- JR = Junior Accelerator Programme entrant
- CO = College Accelerator Programme entrant
- NG = Next Gen Accelerator Program entrant
- w/o = Walkover
- r = Retired
- d = Defaulted

=== Finals ===
Quarterfinals
1	(United States) Bob Bryan (United States) Mike Bryan	7	4	7
(United States) Eric Butorac (United States) Rajeev Ram	5	6	6^{2}
(Germany) Michael Kohlmann (Finland) Jarkko Nieminen	4	6	2
(Chile) Fernando González (Croatia) Ivan Ljubičić	6	1	0r
(Croatia) Ivo Karlović (Serbia) Dušan Vemić	6	6
3	(Czech Republic) Lukáš Dlouhý (India) Leander Paes	3	4
(France) Arnaud Clément (Israel) Jonathan Erlich	4	6	6^{6}
2	(Canada) Daniel Nestor (Serbia) Nenad Zimonjić	6	1	7

Semifinals
1	(United States) Bob Bryan (United States) Mike Bryan	6	6
(Germany) Michael Kohlmann (Finland) Jarkko Nieminen	1	4
(Croatia) Ivo Karlović (Serbia) Dušan Vemić	4	4
2	(Canada) Daniel Nestor (Serbia) Nenad Zimonjić	6	6

Final
1	(United States) Bob Bryan (United States) Mike Bryan	6	6^{5}	6
2	(Canada) Daniel Nestor (Serbia) Nenad Zimonjić	3	7	3

=== Top half ===
==== Section 1 ====
First round
1	(United States) B Bryan (United States) M Bryan	6	7
(Germany) M Berrer (Germany) S Greul	4	5
(India) R Bopanna (Pakistan) A-u-H Qureshi	6	1	6^{6}
(South Africa) R de Voest (United States) S Lipsky	4	6	7
(Italy) F Fognini (Italy) P Starace	5
(France) J Chardy (France) M Gicquel	1	r
(Spain) M López (Spain) S Ventura	4	1
17	(Austria) J Melzer (Germany) P Petzschner	6	6
12	(Brazil) M Melo (Brazil) B Soares	6^{3}	4
(Argentina) L Mayer (Argentina) H Zeballos	7	6
(Ukraine) S Stakhovsky (Germany) M Zverev	1	6^{6}
(Russia) I Andreev (Kazakhstan) E Korolev	6	7
(United States) E Butorac (United States) R Ram	6	6
(Brazil) T Bellucci (Brazil) A Sá	3	4
(United Kingdom) R Hutchins (Australia) J Kerr	4	6	6^{4}
7	(Poland) M Fyrstenberg (Poland) M Matkowski	6	2	7

Second round
1	(United States) B Bryan (United States) M Bryan	6^{4}	6	6
(South Africa) R de Voest (United States) S Lipsky	7	4	4
(Italy) F Fognini (Italy) P Starace	3	2
17	(Austria) J Melzer (Germany) P Petzschner	6	6
(Argentina) L Mayer (Argentina) H Zeballos	6	6
(Russia) I Andreev (Kazakhstan) E Korolev	3	2
(United States) E Butorac (United States) R Ram	6	3	7
7	(Poland) M Fyrstenberg (Poland) M Matkowski	2	6	6^{2}

Third round
1	(United States) B Bryan (United States) M Bryan	7	6
17	(Austria) J Melzer (Germany) P Petzschner	6^{1}	4
(Argentina) L Mayer (Argentina) H Zeballos	7	4	6^{3}
(United States) E Butorac (United States) R Ram	6^{4}	6	7

Quarterfinals
1	(United States) B Bryan (United States) M Bryan	7	4	7
(United States) E Butorac (United States) R Ram	5	6	6^{2}

==== Section 2 ====
First round
4	(India) M Bhupathi (Belarus) M Mirnyi	4	4
(Germany) M Kohlmann (Finland) J Nieminen	6	6
(United Kingdom) C Fleming (United Kingdom) K Skupski	7	6
(Serbia) J Tipsarević (Chinese Taipei) Y-h Lu	5	4
(Italy) S Bolelli (Italy) A Seppi	6	6
(Slovakia) L Lacko (United States) M Russell	4	2
WC	(Australia) M Matosevic (Australia) B Tomic	2	1
14	(Czech Republic) M Damm (Slovakia) F Polášek	6	6
11	(Sweden) S Aspelin (Australia) P Hanley	6	6
(Brazil) M Daniel (Austria) D Köllerer	1	2
(United States) J Cerretani (United States) T Rettenmaier	7	4	5
WC	(India) P Amritaj (India) S Devvarman	5	6	7
(Germany) B Becker (Germany) F Mayer	6^{6}	6^{3}
(Australia) C Ball (Australia) S Huss	7	7
(Chile) F González (Croatia) I Ljubičić	6	7
6	(Czech Republic) F Čermák (Slovakia) M Mertiňák	3	6^{7}

Second round
(Germany) M Kohlmann (Finland) J Nieminen	3	6	6
(United Kingdom) C Fleming (United Kingdom) K Skupski	6	4	3
(Italy) S Bolelli (Italy) A Seppi	7	6
14	(Czech Republic) M Damm (Slovakia) F Polášek	6^{5}	3
11	(Sweden) S Aspelin (Australia) P Hanley	6	6
WC	(India) P Amritaj (India) S Devvarman	1	3
(Australia) C Ball (Australia) S Huss	7	6^{3}	5
(Chile) F González (Croatia) I Ljubičić	5	7	7

Third round
(Germany) M Kohlmann (Finland) J Nieminen	4	7	7
(Italy) S Bolelli (Italy) A Seppi	6	6^{3}	6^{6}
11	(Sweden) S Aspelin (Australia) P Hanley	4	3
(Chile) F González (Croatia) I Ljubičić	6	6

Quarterfinals
(Germany) M Kohlmann (Finland) J Nieminen	4	6	2
(Chile) F González (Croatia) I Ljubičić	6	1	0r

=== Bottom half ===
==== Section 3 ====
First round
5	(Poland) Ł Kubot (Austria) O Marach	6^{1}	6	6
(Argentina) JI Chela (Spain) D Gimeno-Traver	7	3	1
(Russia) I Kunitsyn (Israel) D Sela	6	6
(Switzerland) M Chiudinelli (Serbia) V Troicki	4	2
Alt	(Italy) P Lorenzi (Belgium) C Rochus	6^{3}	6	6^{2}
WC	(Australia) K Hensel (Australia) G Jones	7	3	7
(Croatia) I Karlović (Serbia) D Vemić	6	3	6
9	(Germany) C Kas (Belgium) D Norman	4	6	4
13	(France) M Llodra (Israel) A Ram	5	6	5
(France) J Benneteau (Belgium) S Darcis	7	3	7
(South Africa) J Coetzee (Netherlands) R Wassen	4	1
(United States) J Isner (United States) S Querrey	6	6
(Argentina) L Arnold Ker (Romania) H Tecău	4	7	7
(South Africa) W Moodie (Russia) M Youzhny	6	6^{3}	5
(Czech Republic) L Friedl (Czech Republic) D Škoch	3	1
3	(Czech Republic) L Dlouhý (India) L Paes	6	6

Second round
5	(Poland) Ł Kubot (Austria) O Marach	6	6
(Russia) I Kunitsyn (Israel) D Sela	3	2
WC	(Australia) K Hensel (Australia) G Jones	6	5	5
(Croatia) I Karlović (Serbia) D Vemić	3	7	7
(France) J Benneteau (Belgium) S Darcis	4	0
(United States) J Isner (United States) S Querrey	6	6
(Argentina) L Arnold Ker (Romania) H Tecău	5	3
3	(Czech Republic) L Dlouhý (India) L Paes	7	6

Third round
5	(Poland) Ł Kubot (Austria) O Marach	6	6^{11}	6^{4}
(Croatia) I Karlović (Serbia) D Vemić	2	7	7
(United States) J Isner (United States) S Querrey	3	5
3	(Czech Republic) L Dlouhý (India) L Paes	6	7

Quarterfinals
(Croatia) I Karlović (Serbia) D Vemić	6	6
3	(Czech Republic) L Dlouhý (India) L Paes	3	4

==== Section 4 ====
First round
8	(Spain) M Granollers (Spain) T Robredo	6	6
WC	(Australia) M Ebden (Australia) B Klein	2	4
Alt	(Colombia) A Falla (Colombia) S Giraldo	2	3
(Sweden) J Brunström (Netherlands Antilles) J-J Rojer	6	6
(Spain) F López (Germany) R Schüttler	6	6
(Portugal) F Gil (Belgium) K Vliegen	3	2
(France) A Clément (Israel) J Erlich	6^{3}	6	6
10	(Austria) J Knowle (Sweden) R Lindstedt	7	4	4
15	(Czech Republic) J Levinský (United States) T Parrott	6	6^{5}	2
WC	(Australia) R Junaid (Australia) P Luczak	4	7	6
(Germany) P Marx (Slovakia) I Zelenay	6	6
WC	(Australia) N Lindahl (Australia) M Reid	3	4
(Spain) A Montañés (Argentina) M Vassallo Argüello	6	6
(Argentina) J Acasuso (Argentina) S Prieto	4	4
WC	(Australia) S Groth (Australia) J Kubler	6^{5}	3
2	(Canada) D Nestor (Serbia) N Zimonjić	7	6

Second round
8	(Spain) M Granollers (Spain) T Robredo	3	7	4
(Sweden) J Brunström (Netherlands Antilles) J-J Rojer	6	6^{5}	6
(Spain) F López (Germany) R Schüttler	3	5
(France) A Clément (Israel) J Erlich	6	7
WC	(Australia) R Junaid (Australia) P Luczak	6^{5}	4
(Germany) P Marx (Slovakia) I Zelenay	7	6
(Spain) A Montañés (Argentina) M Vassallo Argüello	3	3
2	(Canada) D Nestor (Serbia) N Zimonjić	6	6

Third round
(Sweden) J Brunström (Netherlands Antilles) J-J Rojer	3	6	5
(France) A Clément (Israel) J Erlich	6	0	7
(Germany) P Marx (Slovakia) I Zelenay	4	2
2	(Canada) D Nestor (Serbia) N Zimonjić	6	6

Quarterfinals
(France) A Clément (Israel) J Erlich	4	6	6^{6}
2	(Canada) D Nestor (Serbia) N Zimonjić	6	1	7
