= 2010 Australian Open – Women's doubles =

Women's doubles
- 2010 Australian Open

Final
- Champion: (United States) Serena Williams (United States) Venus Williams
- Runner-up: (Zimbabwe) Cara Black (United States) Liezel Huber
- Score: 6–4, 6–3

Details
- Draw: 64
- Seeds: 16

Events
Singles	men	women		boys	girls
Doubles	men	women	mixed	boys	girls
WC Singles	men	women	quad
WC Doubles	men	women	quad
Legends	men	women	mixed
- Australian Open

Defending champions Serena and Venus Williams defeated Cara Black and Liezel Huber in the final, 6–4, 6–3 to win the women's doubles tennis title at the 2010 Australian Open. It was the Williams sisters' fourth Australian Open doubles title together, and 11th major title together overall. It was also the third component of an eventual non-calendar-year Grand Slam.

== Seeds ==
1. (Zimbabwe) Cara Black / (United States) Liezel Huber (final)
2. (United States) Serena Williams / (United States) Venus Williams (champions)
3. (Spain) Nuria Llagostera Vives / (Spain) María José Martínez Sánchez (third round)
4. (Chinese Taipei) Hsieh Su-wei / (China) Peng Shuai (third round)
5. (Russia) Nadia Petrova / (Australia) Samantha Stosur (first round)
6. (United States) Lisa Raymond / (Australia) Rennae Stubbs (semifinals)
7. (Russia) Alisa Kleybanova / (Italy) Francesca Schiavone (quarterfinals)
8. (United States) Bethanie Mattek-Sands / (China) Yan Zi (quarterfinals)
9. (Russia) Elena Vesnina / (China) Zheng Jie (third round)
10. (India) Sania Mirza / (Spain) Virginia Ruano Pascual (third round)
11. (Russia) Alla Kudryavtseva / (Russia) Ekaterina Makarova (second round)
12. (Chinese Taipei) Chuang Chia-jung / (Czech Republic) Květa Peschke (second round)
13. (Argentina) Gisela Dulko / (Italy) Flavia Pennetta (quarterfinals)
14. (Germany) Anna-Lena Grönefeld / (United States) Vania King (second round)
15. (Russia) Maria Kirilenko / (Poland) Agnieszka Radwańska (semifinals)
16. (Czech Republic) Iveta Benešová / (Czech Republic) Barbora Záhlavová-Strýcová (second round)

== Draw ==
Key

- Q = Qualifier
- WC = Wild card
- LL = Lucky loser
- Alt = Alternate
- ITF = ITF entry
- PR = Protected ranking
- SR = Special ranking
- SE = Special exempt
- JE = Junior exempt
- JR = Junior Accelerator Programme entrant
- CO = College Accelerator Programme entrant
- NG = Next Gen Accelerator Program entrant
- w/o = Walkover
- r = Retired
- d = Defaulted

=== Finals ===
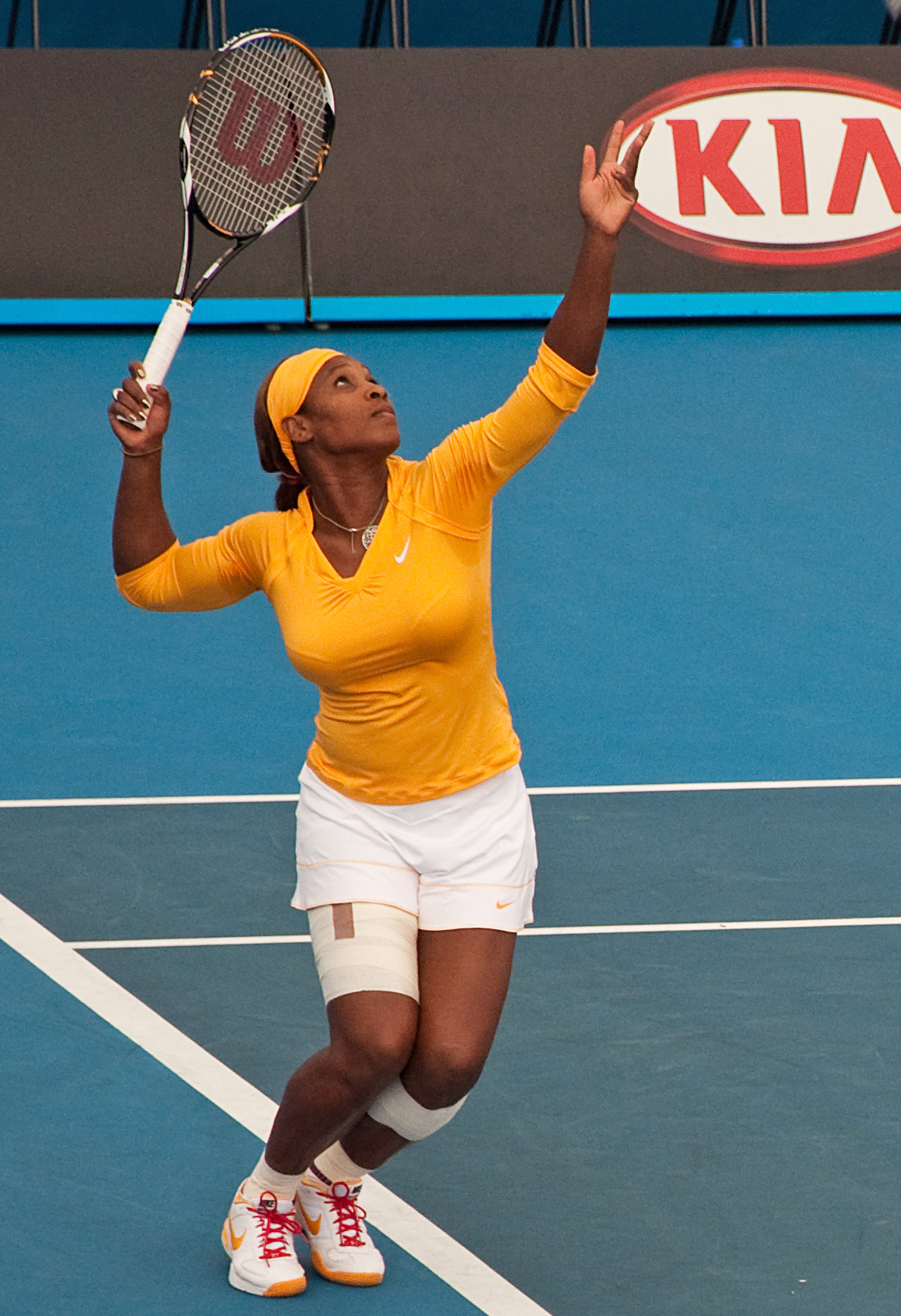
Serena Williams, part of the winning doubles team.

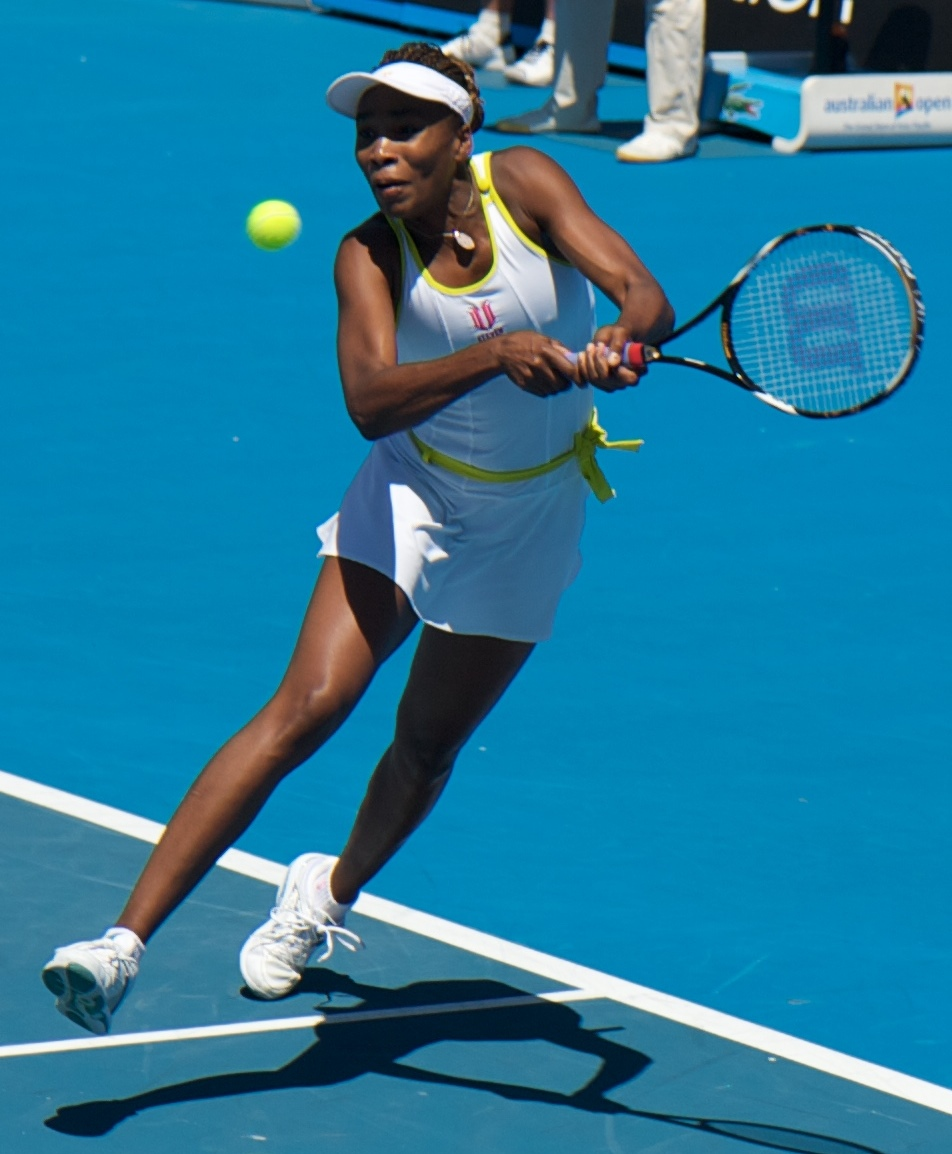
Venus Williams, part of the winning doubles team.

Quarterfinals
1	(Zimbabwe) Cara Black (United States) Liezel Huber	6	6
7	(Russia) Alisa Kleybanova (Italy) Francesca Schiavone	3	4
15	(Russia) Maria Kirilenko (Poland) Agnieszka Radwańska	6	6
WC	(Australia) Sally Peers (United Kingdom) Laura Robson	4	1
6	(United States) Lisa Raymond (Australia) Rennae Stubbs	4	6	6
13	(Argentina) Gisela Dulko (Italy) Flavia Pennetta	6	2	2
8	(United States) Bethanie Mattek-Sands (China) Yan Zi	4	6	4
2	(United States) Serena Williams (United States) Venus Williams	6	4	6

Semifinals
1	(Zimbabwe) Cara Black (United States) Liezel Huber	6	1	6
15	(Russia) Maria Kirilenko (Poland) Agnieszka Radwańska	1	6	3
6	(United States) Lisa Raymond (Australia) Rennae Stubbs	3	6^{6}
2	(United States) Serena Williams (United States) Venus Williams	6	7

Final
1	(Zimbabwe) Cara Black (United States) Liezel Huber	4	3
2	(United States) Serena Williams (United States) Venus Williams	6	6

=== Top half ===
==== Section 1 ====
First round
1	(Zimbabwe) C Black (United States) L Huber	6	6
(Germany) T Malek (Germany) A Petkovic	4	4
(Romania) A Dulgheru (Romania) E Gallovits	3	6	3
(United States) C Gullickson (Czech Republic) V Uhlířová	6	3	6
(Estonia) K Kanepi (Germany) J Wöhr	6^{5}	4
(Belarus) V Azarenka (Russia) S Kuznetsova	7	6
WC	(Australia) S Golds (Australia) M Mirkovic	0	1
14	(Germany) A-L Grönefeld (United States) V King	6	6
10	(India) S Mirza (Spain) V Ruano Pascual	6	6
WC	(Indonesia) Y Basuki (Japan) K Date-Krumm	4	2
(Switzerland) T Bacsinszky (Italy) T Garbin	6	6
(Spain) A Medina Garrigues (Denmark) C Wozniacki	4	4
(Germany) S Lisicki (France) A Rezaï	3	2
(Hungary) M Czink (South Africa) N Grandin	6	6
(Italy) A Brianti (Poland) U Radwańska	6	5	6^{3}
7	(Russia) A Kleybanova (Italy) F Schiavone	4	7	7

Second round
1	(Zimbabwe) C Black (United States) L Huber	6	6
(United States) C Gullickson (Czech Republic) V Uhlířová	2	2
(Belarus) V Azarenka (Russia) S Kuznetsova	6	4	6
14	(Germany) A-L Grönefeld (United States) V King	3	6	3
10	(India) S Mirza (Spain) V Ruano Pascual	7	6
(Switzerland) T Bacsinszky (Italy) T Garbin	6^{3}	3
(Hungary) M Czink (South Africa) N Grandin	5	4
7	(Russia) A Kleybanova (Italy) F Schiavone	7	6

Third round
1	(Zimbabwe) C Black (United States) L Huber	6	6
(Belarus) V Azarenka (Russia) S Kuznetsova	3	3
10	(India) S Mirza (Spain) V Ruano Pascual	4	3
7	(Russia) A Kleybanova (Italy) F Schiavone	6	6

Quarterfinals
1	(Zimbabwe) C Black (United States) L Huber	6	6
7	(Russia) A Kleybanova (Italy) F Schiavone	3	4

==== Section 2 ====
First round
3	(Spain) N Llagostera Vives (Spain) MJ Martínez Sánchez	7	6
(Australia) J Dokić (Czech Republic) P Kvitová	5	0
(Israel) S Pe'er (Kazakhstan) G Voskoboeva	6	7
(Slovakia) M Rybáriková (Czech Republic) R Voráčová	2	5
(United Kingdom) E Baltacha (Latvia) L Dekmeijere	7	6
(Czech Republic) L Šafářová (Canada) A Wozniak	5	2
(Romania) S Cîrstea (Russia) A Pavlyuchenkova	0	7	2
15	(Russia) M Kirilenko (Poland) A Radwańska	6	6^{4}	6
12	(Chinese Taipei) C-j Chuang (Czech Republic) K Peschke	6	7
(Turkey) İ Şenoğlu (Kazakhstan) Y Shvedova	0	5
WC	(Australia) S Peers (United Kingdom) L Robson	6	7
(United States) J Craybas (United States) A Spears	3	5
(Hungary) Á Szávay (Italy) R Vinci	7	6
(Belarus) O Govortsova (Belarus) T Poutchek	5	4
(Russia) V Dushevina (Australia) A Rodionova	3	6	6
5	(Russia) N Petrova (Australia) S Stosur	6	4	1

Second round
3	(Spain) N Llagostera Vives (Spain) MJ Martínez Sánchez	7	6
(Israel) S Pe'er (Kazakhstan) G Voskoboeva	6^{5}	4
(United Kingdom) E Baltacha (Latvia) L Dekmeijere	0	2
15	(Russia) M Kirilenko (Poland) A Radwańska	6	6
12	(Chinese Taipei) C-j Chuang (Czech Republic) K Peschke	3	4
WC	(Australia) S Peers (United Kingdom) L Robson	6	6
(Hungary) Á Szávay (Italy) R Vinci	4	6	2
(Russia) V Dushevina (Australia) A Rodionova	6	3	6

Third round
3	(Spain) N Llagostera Vives (Spain) MJ Martínez Sánchez	1	2
15	(Russia) M Kirilenko (Poland) A Radwańska	6	6
WC	(Australia) S Peers (United Kingdom) L Robson	6	6
(Russia) V Dushevina (Australia) A Rodionova	3	3

Quarterfinals
15	(Russia) M Kirilenko (Poland) A Radwańska	6	6
WC	(Australia) S Peers (United Kingdom) L Robson	4	1

=== Bottom half ===
==== Section 3 ====
First round
6	(United States) L Raymond (Australia) R Stubbs	6	6
(Ukraine) M Koryttseva (Belarus) D Kustova	4	1
WC	(Australia) J Groth (Australia) O Rogowska	3	5
(France) J Coin (Canada) M-È Pelletier	6	7
(Chinese Taipei) Y-j Chan (Romania) M Niculescu	6	6
WC	(Australia) M Adamczak (Australia) N Kriz	3	1
(Australia) C Dellacqua (New Zealand) M Erakovic	6	2	1
11	(Russia) A Kudryavtseva (Russia) E Makarova	2	6	6
13	(Argentina) G Dulko (Italy) F Pennetta	6	2	6
(Ukraine) A Bondarenko (Ukraine) K Bondarenko	4	6	3
(Slovenia) P Hercog (Croatia) P Martić	4	6^{3}
(United Kingdom) S Borwell (United States) R Kops-Jones	6	7
WC	(Australia) A Molik (United States) M Shaughnessy	6	5	4
(Poland) K Jans (Poland) A Rosolska	2	7	6
(Germany) J Görges (Spain) A Parra Santonja	3	4
4	(Chinese Taipei) S-w Hsieh (China) S Peng	6	6

Second round
6	(United States) L Raymond (Australia) R Stubbs	6	7
(France) J Coin (Canada) M-È Pelletier	2	5
(Chinese Taipei) Y-j Chan (Romania) M Niculescu	6	6
11	(Russia) A Kudryavtseva (Russia) E Makarova	4	4
13	(Argentina) G Dulko (Italy) F Pennetta	7	6
(United Kingdom) S Borwell (United States) R Kops-Jones	5	2
(Poland) K Jans (Poland) A Rosolska	3	2
4	(Chinese Taipei) S-w Hsieh (China) S Peng	6	6

Third round
6	(United States) L Raymond (Australia) R Stubbs	7	6
(Chinese Taipei) Y-j Chan (Romania) M Niculescu	5	3
13	(Argentina) G Dulko (Italy) F Pennetta	6	6
4	(Chinese Taipei) S-w Hsieh (China) S Peng	2	2

Quarterfinals
6	(United States) L Raymond (Australia) R Stubbs	4	6	6
13	(Argentina) G Dulko (Italy) F Pennetta	6	2	2

==== Section 4 ====
First round
8	(United States) B Mattek-Sands (China) Z Yan	6	6
(Belgium) K Flipkens (United States) M Oudin	3	2
(Serbia) J Janković (United States) S Perry	6	6
(Slovakia) D Cibulková (Netherlands) M Krajicek	1	4
(Russia) M Kondratieva (Latvia) A Sevastova	5	6	2
(France) V Razzano (Belgium) Y Wickmayer	7	3	6
(France) A Cornet (Canada) S Fichman	5	3
9	(Russia) E Vesnina (China) J Zheng	7	6
16	(Czech Republic) I Benešová (Czech Republic) B Záhlavová-Strýcová	6	6
(Italy) S Errani (Spain) C Suárez Navarro	2	1
(Czech Republic) A Hlaváčková (Czech Republic) L Hradecká	6	6
(Russia) A Chakvetadze (Austria) T Paszek	4	3
(Uzbekistan) A Amanmuradova (Thailand) T Tanasugarn	6	1	2
(Romania) IR Olaru (Ukraine) O Savchuk	4	6	6
WC	(Australia) S Ferguson (Australia) J Moore	1	1
2	(United States) S Williams (United States) V Williams	6	6

Second round
8	(United States) B Mattek-Sands (China) Z Yan	6	4	6
(Serbia) J Janković (United States) S Perry	2	6	1
(France) V Razzano (Belgium) Y Wickmayer	w/o
9	(Russia) E Vesnina (China) J Zheng
16	(Czech Republic) I Benešová (Czech Republic) B Záhlavová-Strýcová	6^{2}	2
(Czech Republic) A Hlaváčková (Czech Republic) L Hradecká	7	6
(Romania) IR Olaru (Ukraine) O Savchuk	1	2
2	(United States) S Williams (United States) V Williams	6	6

Third round
8	(United States) B Mattek-Sands (China) Z Yan	6	6
9	(Russia) E Vesnina (China) J Zheng	4	4
(Czech Republic) A Hlaváčková (Czech Republic) L Hradecká	3	2
2	(United States) S Williams (United States) V Williams	6	6

Quarterfinals
8	(United States) B Mattek-Sands (China) Z Yan	4	6	4
2	(United States) S Williams (United States) V Williams	6	4	6
