= 2010 Australian Open – Men's singles =

Men's singles
- 2010 Australian Open

Final
- Champion: (Switzerland) Roger Federer
- Runner-up: (United Kingdom) Andy Murray
- Score: 6–3, 6–4, 7–6^{(13–11)}

Details
- Draw: 128
- Seeds: 32

Events
Singles	men	women		boys	girls
Doubles	men	women	mixed	boys	girls
WC Singles	men	women	quad
WC Doubles	men	women	quad
Legends	men	women	mixed
- Australian Open

Roger Federer defeated Andy Murray in the final, 6–3, 6–4, 7–6^{(13–11)} to win the men's singles tennis title at the 2010 Australian Open. It was his fourth Australian Open title and 16th major title overall. For the last time in his career, Federer became the reigning champion at three of the four majors, having also won the previous year's French Open and Wimbledon Championships, and missing out only on the US Open (where he finished runner-up to Juan Martín del Potro).

Rafael Nadal was the defending champion, but retired due to a right knee injury in the quarterfinals against Murray. It would be Nadal's only loss at the majors this year, as he would go on to sweep the French Open, Wimbledon Championships, and the US Open.

This event marked the last major appearance for former world No. 1, 1997 finalist and 1998 French Open champion Carlos Moyá.

== Seeds ==
1. (Switzerland) Roger Federer (champion)
2. (Spain) Rafael Nadal (quarterfinals, retired due to a right knee injury)
3. (Serbia) Novak Djokovic (quarterfinals)
4. (Argentina) Juan Martín del Potro (fourth round)
5. (United Kingdom) Andy Murray (final)
6. (Russia) Nikolay Davydenko (quarterfinals)
7. (United States) Andy Roddick (quarterfinals)
8. (Sweden) Robin Söderling (first round)
9. (Spain) Fernando Verdasco (fourth round)
10. (France) Jo-Wilfried Tsonga (semifinals)
11. (Chile) Fernando González (fourth round)
12. (France) Gaël Monfils (third round)
13. (Czech Republic) Radek Štěpánek (first round)
14. (Croatia) Marin Čilić (semifinals)
15. (France) ~~Gilles Simon~~ (withdrew due to a right knee injury)
16. (Spain) Tommy Robredo (first round)
17. (Spain) David Ferrer (second round)

18. (Germany) Tommy Haas (third round)
19. (Switzerland) Stanislas Wawrinka (third round)
20. (Russia) Mikhail Youzhny (third round, withdrew due to a right wrist injury)
21. (Czech Republic) Tomáš Berdych (second round)
22. (Australia) Lleyton Hewitt (fourth round)
23. (Spain) Juan Carlos Ferrero (first round)
24. (Croatia) Ivan Ljubičić (third round)
25. (United States) Sam Querrey (first round)
26. (Spain) Nicolás Almagro (fourth round)
27. (Germany) Philipp Kohlschreiber (third round)
28. (Austria) Jürgen Melzer (first round)
29. (Serbia) Viktor Troicki (second round)
30. (Argentina) Juan Mónaco (third round)
31. (Spain) Albert Montañés (third round)
32. (France) Jérémy Chardy (first round)
33. (United States) John Isner (fourth round)

Click on the seed number of a player to go to their draw section.

== Draw ==
Key

- Q = Qualifier
- WC = Wild card
- LL = Lucky loser
- Alt = Alternate
- ITF = ITF entry
- PR = Protected ranking
- SR = Special ranking
- SE = Special exempt
- JE = Junior exempt
- JR = Junior Accelerator Programme entrant
- CO = College Accelerator Programme entrant
- NG = Next Gen Accelerator Program entrant
- w/o = Walkover
- r = Retired
- d = Defaulted

=== Finals ===
Quarterfinals
1	(Switzerland) Roger Federer	2	6	6	7
6	(Russia) Nikolay Davydenko	6	3	0	5
3	(Serbia) Novak Djokovic	6^{8}	7^{7}	6	3	1
10	(France) Jo-Wilfried Tsonga	7^{10}	6^{5}	1	6	6
7	(United States) Andy Roddick	6^{4}	3	6	6	3
14	(Croatia) Marin Čilić	7^{7}	6	3	2	6
5	(United Kingdom) Andy Murray	6	7^{7}	3
2	(Spain) Rafael Nadal	3	6^{2}	0^{r}

Semifinals
1	(Switzerland) Roger Federer	6	6	6
10	(France) Jo-Wilfried Tsonga	2	3	2
14	(Croatia) Marin Čilić	6	4	4	2
5	(United Kingdom) Andy Murray	3	6	6	6

Final
1	(Switzerland) Roger Federer	6	6	7^{13}
5	(United Kingdom) Andy Murray	3	4	6^{11}

=== Top half ===
==== Section 1 ====
First round
1	(Switzerland) R Federer	4	6	7^{7}	6
(Russia) I Andreev	6	2	6^{2}	0
(Argentina) JI Chela	4	3	6^{2}
(Romania) V Hănescu	6	6	7^{7}
(France) S Robert	6	7^{7}	7^{7}
(Italy) P Starace	3	6^{2}	6^{4}
(Spain) Ó Hernández	6^{5}	2^{r}
31	(Spain) A Montañés	7^{7}	2
22	(Australia) L Hewitt	6	6	6
Q	(Brazil) R Hocevar	1	2	3
(Belgium) C Rochus	6	5	2	4
Q	(United States) D Young	1	7	6	6
(Italy) P Lorenzi	2	4	4
(Cyprus) M Baghdatis	6	6	6
(Portugal) F Gil	0	0	0^{r}
17	(Spain) D Ferrer	6	6	2

Second round
1	(Switzerland) R Federer	6	6	6
(Romania) V Hănescu	2	3	2
(France) S Robert	6	7^{7}	2	3	2
31	(Spain) A Montañés	4	6^{3}	6	6	6
22	(Australia) L Hewitt	7^{7}	6	6
Q	(United States) D Young	6^{3}	4	1
(Cyprus) M Baghdatis	4	3	7^{7}	6	6
17	(Spain) D Ferrer	6	6	6^{4}	3	1

Third round
1	(Switzerland) R Federer	6	6	6
31	(Spain) A Montañés	3	4	4
22	(Australia) L Hewitt	6	4
(Cyprus) M Baghdatis	0	2^{r}

Fourth round
1	(Switzerland) R Federer	6	6	6
22	(Australia) L Hewitt	2	3	4

==== Section 2 ====
First round
9	(Spain) F Verdasco	6^{4}	7^{7}	7	6
WC	(Australia) C Ball	7^{7}	6^{1}	5	2
Q	(Ukraine) I Sergeyev	6	7^{7}	4	7^{10}
(Israel) D Sela	3	6^{3}	6	6^{8}
(United States) R Ram	6	3	7	1	3
Q	(Austria) S Koubek	4	6	5	6	6
Q	(Croatia) I Dodig	2	1	6	6	6
23	(Spain) JC Ferrero	6	6	4	1	1
30	(Argentina) J Mónaco	6	7^{7}	6
(Latvia) E Gulbis	3	6^{5}	1
(Argentina) M Vassallo Argüello	3	5	4
(France) M Llodra	6	7	6
PR	(Spain) C Moyá	6^{2}	5	3
Q	(Ukraine) I Marchenko	7^{7}	7	6
Q	(Germany) D Kindlmann	1	0	3
6	(Russia) N Davydenko	6	6	6

Second round
9	(Spain) F Verdasco	6	6	6
Q	(Ukraine) I Sergeyev	1	2	2
Q	(Austria) S Koubek	7^{7}	6	6
Q	(Croatia) I Dodig	6^{4}	1	2
30	(Argentina) J Mónaco	3	3	7^{7}	6	6
(France) M Llodra	6	6	6^{5}	1	3
Q	(Ukraine) I Marchenko	3	3	0
6	(Russia) N Davydenko	6	6	6

Third round
9	(Spain) F Verdasco	6	0
Q	(Austria) S Koubek	1	0^{r}
30	(Argentina) J Mónaco	0	3	4
6	(Russia) N Davydenko	6	6	6

Fourth round
9	(Spain) F Verdasco	2	5	6	7^{7}	3
6	(Russia) N Davydenko	6	7	4	6^{5}	6

==== Section 3 ====
First round
3	(Serbia) N Djokovic	7	6	6
(Spain) D Gimeno-Traver	5	3	2
WC	(Australia) M Matosevic	6^{7}	6^{3}	6	3
(Switzerland) M Chiudinelli	7^{9}	7^{7}	4	6
PR	(Belgium) K Vliegen	1	2	1
(Germany) M Berrer	6	6	6
(Uzbekistan) D Istomin	6	6	6
32	(France) J Chardy	2	2	0
20	(Russia) M Youzhny	6^{9}	4	7^{7}	7^{7}	6
(France) R Gasquet	7^{11}	6	6^{2}	6^{4}	4
(Czech Republic) J Hájek	7^{7}	7	6
(United States) R Ginepri	6^{2}	5	1
(Poland) Ł Kubot	6	6	6
(Germany) M Zverev	3	3	3
(Colombia) S Giraldo	6	6	6
16	(Spain) T Robredo	4	2	2

Second round
3	(Serbia) N Djokovic	3	6	6	6
(Switzerland) M Chiudinelli	6	1	1	3
(Germany) M Berrer	5	3	4
(Uzbekistan) D Istomin	7	6	6
20	(Russia) M Youzhny	6	6	6
(Czech Republic) J Hájek	2	1	1
(Poland) Ł Kubot	6	3	6	6
(Colombia) S Giraldo	4	6	3	1

Third round
3	(Serbia) N Djokovic	6	6	6
(Uzbekistan) D Istomin	1	1	2
20	(Russia) M Youzhny
(Poland) Ł Kubot	^{w/o}

Fourth round
3	(Serbia) N Djokovic	6	6	7
(Poland) Ł Kubot	1	2	5

==== Section 4 ====
First round
10	(France) J-W Tsonga	6	6	6
(Ukraine) S Stakhovsky	3	4	4
(Italy) F Fognini	1	3	3
(United States) T Dent	6	6	6
WC	(United States) R Harrison	2	4	6^{3}
(Serbia) J Tipsarević	6	6	7^{7}
(Germany) S Greul	7^{7}	4	2	1
18	(Germany) T Haas	6^{5}	6	6	6
26	(Spain) N Almagro	7^{14}	6	2	4	8
Q	(Belgium) X Malisse	6^{12}	4	6	6	6
(Germany) B Becker	7^{7}	7	7
Q	(Slovenia) G Žemlja	6^{5}	5	5
(Colombia) A Falla	7	6	6
(Brazil) M Daniel	5	3	1
(Spain) M Granollers	5	2	6	6	6
8	(Sweden) R Söderling	7	6	4	4	2

Second round
10	(France) J-W Tsonga	6	6	6
(United States) T Dent	4	3	3
(Serbia) J Tipsarević	6	4	3	6	3
18	(Germany) T Haas	4	6	6	1	6
26	(Spain) N Almagro	6	6	3	4	6
(Germany) B Becker	4	2	6	6	3
(Colombia) A Falla	6	6	6
(Spain) M Granollers	4	1	3

Third round
10	(France) J-W Tsonga	6	3	6	7
18	(Germany) T Haas	4	6	1	5
26	(Spain) N Almagro	6	6	6
(Colombia) A Falla	4	3	4

Fourth round
10	(France) J-W Tsonga	6	6	4	6^{6}	9
26	(Spain) N Almagro	3	4	6	7^{8}	7

=== Bottom half ===
==== Section 5 ====
First round
7	(United States) A Roddick	6	6	6
(Netherlands) T de Bakker	1	4	4
(Russia) T Gabashvili	3	5	6	4
(Brazil) T Bellucci	6	7	4	6
(Spain) F López	6	6	7
(Uruguay) P Cuevas	1	4	5
(Germany) R Schüttler	6	2	6	6
25	(United States) S Querrey	3	6	4	3
21	(Czech Republic) T Berdych	6	6	6
PR	(Netherlands) R Haase	0	3	3
(Germany) D Brands	2	5	5
(Kazakhstan) E Korolev	6	7	7
WC	(France) S Grosjean	4	3	5
LL	(Turkey) M İlhan	6	6	7
(Belgium) O Rochus	3	4	6	1
11	(Chile) F González	6	6	3	6

Second round
7	(United States) A Roddick	6	6	6
(Brazil) T Bellucci	3	4	4
(Spain) F López	6	2	6	6
(Germany) R Schüttler	3	6	3	2
21	(Czech Republic) T Berdych	4	4	5
(Kazakhstan) E Korolev	6	6	7
LL	(Turkey) M İlhan	3	4	5
11	(Chile) F González	6	6	7

Third round
7	(United States) A Roddick	6^{4}	6	6	7^{7}
(Spain) F López	7^{7}	4	4	6^{3}
(Kazakhstan) E Korolev	7^{7}	3	6	3	4
11	(Chile) F González	6^{5}	6	1	6	6

Fourth round
7	(United States) A Roddick	6	3	4	7	6
11	(Chile) F González	3	6	6	5	2

==== Section 6 ====
First round
14	(Croatia) M Čilić	7	7	6
(France) F Santoro	5	5	3
Q	(France) G Rufin	3	4	4
WC	(Australia) B Tomic	6	6	6
(Russia) I Kunitsyn	6	2	6	6
(Argentina) J Acasuso	1	6	4	2
(Spain) G García-López	3	3	2
19	(Switzerland) S Wawrinka	6	6	6
29	(Serbia) V Troicki	4	6	6	6
(Ecuador) N Lapentti	6	3	1	3
(Germany) P Petzschner	6	6	4	2	2
(Germany) F Mayer	0	2	6	6	6
(United States) J Blake	7	7	6
(France) A Clément	5	5	2
(United States) M Russell	4	4	6	2
4	(Argentina) JM del Potro	6	6	3	6

Second round
14	(Croatia) M Čilić	6^{6}	6	4	6	6
WC	(Australia) B Tomic	7^{8}	3	6	2	4
(Russia) I Kunitsyn	3	2	2
19	(Switzerland) S Wawrinka	6	6	6
29	(Serbia) V Troicki	6	4	6^{2}	1
(Germany) F Mayer	4	6	7^{7}	6
(United States) J Blake	4	7^{7}	7	3	8
4	(Argentina) JM del Potro	6	6^{3}	5	6	10

Third round
14	(Croatia) M Čilić	4	6	6	6
19	(Switzerland) S Wawrinka	6	4	3	3
(Germany) F Mayer	3	6	4	5
4	(Argentina) JM del Potro	6	0	6	7

Fourth round
14	(Croatia) M Čilić	5	6	7	5	6
4	(Argentina) JM del Potro	7	4	5	7	3

==== Section 7 ====
First round
5	(United Kingdom) A Murray	6	6	6
Q	(South Africa) K Anderson	1	1	2
(France) M Gicquel	7^{7}	7^{7}	6
(Italy) S Bolelli	6^{2}	6^{3}	3
(Finland) J Nieminen	6	7	6
WC	(Australia) N Lindahl	2	5	4
(France) F Serra	6	6^{3}	6	4	6
28	(Austria) J Melzer	1	7^{7}	4	6	3
33	(United States) J Isner	6	6	3	5	6
(Italy) A Seppi	3	3	6	7	4
Q	(Republic of Ireland) L Sorensen	6	3	6	6
(Chinese Taipei) Y-h Lu	4	6	2	1
(Austria) D Köllerer	4	6	7^{7}	1	4
Q	(Croatia) A Veić	6	3	6^{3}	6	6
Q	(Australia) M Ebden	4	4	4
12	(France) G Monfils	6	6	6

Second round
5	(United Kingdom) A Murray	6	6	6
(France) M Gicquel	1	4	3
(Finland) J Nieminen	6	4	7	6^{4}	5
(France) F Serra	3	6	5	7^{7}	7
33	(United States) J Isner	6	7^{7}	7
Q	(Republic of Ireland) L Sorensen	3	6^{4}	5
Q	(Croatia) A Veić	4	4	4
12	(France) G Monfils	6	6	6

Third round
5	(United Kingdom) A Murray	7	6	6
(France) F Serra	5	1	4
33	(United States) J Isner	6	4	7^{7}	7^{7}
12	(France) G Monfils	1	6	6^{4}	6^{5}

Fourth round
5	(United Kingdom) A Murray	7^{7}	6	6
33	(United States) J Isner	6^{4}	3	2

==== Section 8 ====
First round
13	(Czech Republic) R Štěpánek	6	6^{5}	4	6	4
(Croatia) I Karlović	2	7^{7}	6	3	6
(France) J Benneteau	0	6	7^{7}	7^{7}
Q	(France) D Guez	6	4	6^{4}	6^{2}
(United States) M Fish	2	6	3	3
WC	(Kazakhstan) A Golubev	6	1	6	6
WC	(Australia) J Kubler	1	2	2
24	(Croatia) I Ljubičić	6	6	6
27	(Germany) P Kohlschreiber	6	7	6
(Argentina) H Zeballos	1	5	1
Q	(Slovenia) B Kavčič	6	1	4	2
(United States) W Odesnik	4	6	6	6
(Slovakia) L Lacko	6	6	6
(Argentina) L Mayer	4	4	0
(Australia) P Luczak	6^{0}	1	4
2	(Spain) R Nadal	7^{7}	6	6

Second round
(Croatia) I Karlović	2	6	6	6
(France) J Benneteau	6	1	3	3
WC	(Kazakhstan) A Golubev	3	6	2	3
24	(Croatia) I Ljubičić	6	3	6	6
27	(Germany) P Kohlschreiber	6	3	6	6
(United States) W Odesnik	4	6	3	2
(Slovakia) L Lacko	2	2	2
2	(Spain) R Nadal	6	6	6

Third round
(Croatia) I Karlović	6	3	6	7^{9}
24	(Croatia) I Ljubičić	3	6	3	6^{7}
27	(Germany) P Kohlschreiber	4	2	6	5
2	(Spain) R Nadal	6	6	2	7

Fourth round
(Croatia) I Karlović	4	6	4	4
2	(Spain) R Nadal	6	4	6	6

Preceded by 2009 US Open – Men's singles	Grand Slam men's singles	Succeeded by 2010 French Open – Men's singles
