= 2010 Australian Open – Women's singles =

Tennis tournament

Women's singles
- 2010 Australian Open

Final
- Champion: (United States) Serena Williams
- Runner-up: (Belgium) Justine Henin
- Score: 6–4, 3–6, 6–2

Details
- Draw: 128 (12Q / 8WC)
- Seeds: 32

Events
Singles	men	women		boys	girls
Doubles	men	women	mixed	boys	girls
WC Singles	men	women	quad
WC Doubles	men	women	quad
Legends	men	women	mixed
- Australian Open

Defending champion Serena Williams defeated Justine Henin in the final, 6–4, 3–6, 6–2 to win the women's singles title at the 2010 Australian Open. It was her fifth Australian Open singles title and twelfth major singles title overall, surpassing the Open Era record (jointly held by Margaret Court, Steffi Graf, Monica Seles and Evonne Goolagong Cawley) for the most Australian Open singles titles. This was Henin's first major since the 2008 Australian Open, following her retirement in May 2008. Henin was unseeded at a major for the first time since the 2001 Australian Open, and was awarded a wild card into the tournament.

Li Na entered the top 10 in the WTA rankings for the first time by reaching the semifinals, the first Chinese player to enter the top 10.

== Seeds ==
1. (United States) Serena Williams (champion)
2. (Russia) Dinara Safina (fourth round, retired because of a lower back injury)
3. (Russia) Svetlana Kuznetsova (fourth round)
4. (Denmark) Caroline Wozniacki (fourth round)
5. (Russia) Elena Dementieva (second round)
6. (United States) Venus Williams (quarterfinals)
7. (Belarus) Victoria Azarenka (quarterfinals)
8. (Serbia) Jelena Janković (third round)
9. (Russia) Vera Zvonareva (fourth round)
10. (Poland) Agnieszka Radwańska (third round)
11. (France) Marion Bartoli (third round)
12. (Italy) Flavia Pennetta (second round)
13. (Australia) Samantha Stosur (fourth round)
14. (Russia) Maria Sharapova (first round)
15. (Belgium) Kim Clijsters (third round)
16. (China) Li Na (semifinals)

17. (Italy) Francesca Schiavone (fourth round)
18. (France) Virginie Razzano (first round)
19. (Russia) Nadia Petrova (quarterfinals)
20. (Serbia) Ana Ivanovic (second round)
21. (Germany) Sabine Lisicki (second round)
22. (Slovakia) Daniela Hantuchová (third round)
23. (Slovakia) Dominika Cibulková (first round)
24. (Spain) María José Martínez Sánchez (second round)
25. (Spain) Anabel Medina Garrigues (first round)
26. (France) Aravane Rezaï (second round)
27. (Russia) Alisa Kleybanova (third round)
28. (Russia) Elena Vesnina (first round)
29. (Israel) Shahar Pe'er (third round)
30. (Ukraine) Kateryna Bondarenko (second round)
31. (Ukraine) Alona Bondarenko (fourth round)
32. (Spain) Carla Suárez Navarro (third round)

Note: Yanina Wickmayer, who would have been placed in the entry list on the initial entry cutoff date of 7 December 2009 and seeded 16th, entered late and played the qualifying tournament.

Click on the seed number of a player to go to their draw section.

== Draw ==
Key

- Q = Qualifier
- WC = Wild card
- LL = Lucky loser
- Alt = Alternate
- ITF = ITF entry
- PR = Protected ranking
- SR = Special ranking
- SE = Special exempt
- JE = Junior exempt
- JR = Junior Accelerator Programme entrant
- CO = College Accelerator Programme entrant
- NG = Next Gen Accelerator Program entrant
- w/o = Walkover
- r = Retired
- d = Defaulted

=== Finals ===
Quarterfinals
1	(United States) Serena Williams	4	7^{7}	6
7	(Belarus) Victoria Azarenka	6	6^{4}	2
16	(China) Li Na	2	7^{7}	7
6	(United States) Venus Williams	6	6^{4}	5
WC	(Belgium) Justine Henin	7^{7}	7
19	(Russia) Nadia Petrova	6^{3}	5
(China) Zheng Jie	6	6
(Russia) Maria Kirilenko	1	3

Semifinals
1	(United States) Serena Williams	7^{7}	7^{7}
16	(China) Li Na	6^{4}	6^{1}
WC	(Belgium) Justine Henin	6	6
(China) Zheng Jie	1	0

Final
1	(United States) Serena Williams	6	3	6
WC	(Belgium) Justine Henin	4	6	2

=== Top half ===
==== Section 1 ====
First round
1	(United States) S Williams	6	6
(Poland) U Radwańska	2	1
(Czech Republic) P Kvitová	6	7
(United States) J Craybas	1	5
Q	(Czech Republic) R Voráčová	2	4
(Germany) A Petkovic	6	6
(Japan) A Morita	5	4
32	(Spain) C Suárez Navarro	7	6
21	(Germany) S Lisicki	6	6
(Croatia) P Martić	1	4
(United States) V Lepchenko	0	6	1
(Italy) A Brianti	6	3	6
(Germany) K Barrois	6	7^{8}
(Uzbekistan) A Amanmuradova	0	6^{6}
Q	(China) X Han	1	6	2
13	(Australia) S Stosur	6	3	6

Second round
1	(United States) S Williams	6	6
(Czech Republic) P Kvitová	2	1
(Germany) A Petkovic	1	4
32	(Spain) C Suárez Navarro	6	6
21	(Germany) S Lisicki	6	4	4
(Italy) A Brianti	2	6	6
(Germany) K Barrois	5	3
13	(Australia) S Stosur	7	6

Third round
1	(United States) S Williams	6	6
32	(Spain) C Suárez Navarro	0	3
(Italy) A Brianti	4	1
13	(Australia) S Stosur	6	6

Fourth round
1	(United States) S Williams	6	6
13	(Australia) S Stosur	4	2

==== Section 2 ====
First round
9	(Russia) V Zvonareva	6	6
(Slovakia) K Kučová	2	0
(Chinese Taipei) K-c Chang	5	2
(Czech Republic) I Benešová	7	6
Q	(Slovakia) Z Kučová	0	7	5
(Argentina) G Dulko	6	5	7
Q	(United States) S Perry	2	3
20	(Serbia) A Ivanovic	6	6
28	(Russia) E Vesnina	6^{5}	4
(Italy) T Garbin	7^{7}	6
(Japan) K Date-Krumm	4	2
(Kazakhstan) Y Shvedova	6	6
(Switzerland) S Vögele	7	6^{5}	9
(Hungary) M Czink	5	7^{7}	7
WC	(France) S Cohen-Aloro	2	0
7	(Belarus) V Azarenka	6	6

Second round
9	(Russia) V Zvonareva	6	6
(Czech Republic) I Benešová	0	3
(Argentina) G Dulko	6^{6}	7	6
20	(Serbia) A Ivanovic	7^{8}	5	4
(Italy) T Garbin	6^{5}	6	6
(Kazakhstan) Y Shvedova	7^{7}	2	0
(Switzerland) S Vögele	4	0
7	(Belarus) V Azarenka	6	6

Third round
9	(Russia) V Zvonareva	6	7
(Argentina) G Dulko	1	5
(Italy) T Garbin	0	2
7	(Belarus) V Azarenka	6	6

Fourth round
9	(Russia) V Zvonareva	6	4	0
7	(Belarus) V Azarenka	4	6	6

==== Section 3 ====
First round
4	(Denmark) C Wozniacki	6	6
(Canada) A Wozniak	4	2
PR	(Austria) T Paszek	0	6	3
(Germany) J Görges	6	3	6
(Kazakhstan) G Voskoboeva	4	4
(Bulgaria) T Pironkova	6	6
(Czech Republic) L Hradecká	7^{7}	2	1
29	(Israel) S Pe'er	6^{5}	6	6
22	(Slovakia) D Hantuchová	3	6	7
(Ukraine) V Kutuzova	6	1	5
WC	(Australia) J Groth	2	6	4
Q	(Sweden) S Arvidsson	6	4	6
(Canada) S Dubois	3	2
(Hungary) Á Szávay	6	6
PR	(New Zealand) M Erakovic	2	0
16	(China) N Li	6	6

Second round
4	(Denmark) C Wozniacki	6	6
(Germany) J Görges	3	1
(Bulgaria) T Pironkova	1	4
29	(Israel) S Pe'er	6	6
22	(Slovakia) D Hantuchová	6	6
Q	(Sweden) S Arvidsson	4	1
(Hungary) Á Szávay	6	5	2
16	(China) N Li	3	7	6

Third round
4	(Denmark) C Wozniacki	6	6
29	(Israel) S Pe'er	4	0
22	(Slovakia) D Hantuchová	5	6	2
16	(China) N Li	7	3	6

Fourth round
4	(Denmark) C Wozniacki	4	3
16	(China) N Li	6	6

==== Section 4 ====
First round
10	(Poland) A Radwańska	6	6
(Germany) T Malek	1	0
(United States) M Oudin	6	5	5
(Russia) A Kudryavtseva	2	7	7
(France) J Coin	3	7^{7}	6
WC	(Australia) A Molik	6	6^{4}	3
(France) A Cornet	6	5	0
17	(Italy) F Schiavone	0	7	6
25	(Spain) A Medina Garrigues	3	2
(Croatia) K Šprem	6	6
(Belarus) A Yakimova	2	6	4
WC	(Australia) C Dellacqua	6	3	6
(Spain) A Parra Santonja	3	2
(Austria) S Bammer	6	6
(Czech Republic) L Šafářová	2	2
6	(United States) V Williams	6	6

Second round
10	(Poland) A Radwańska	6	6
(Russia) A Kudryavtseva	0	2
(France) J Coin	3	4
17	(Italy) F Schiavone	6	6
(Croatia) K Šprem	6^{4}	6^{6}
WC	(Australia) C Dellacqua	7^{7}	7^{8}
(Austria) S Bammer	2	5
6	(United States) V Williams	6	7

Third round
10	(Poland) A Radwańska	2	2
17	(Italy) F Schiavone	6	6
WC	(Australia) C Dellacqua	1	6^{4}
6	(United States) V Williams	6	7^{7}

Fourth round
17	(Italy) F Schiavone	6	2	1
6	(United States) V Williams	3	6	6

=== Bottom half ===
==== Section 5 ====
First round
5	(Russia) E Dementieva	6	6
(Russia) V Dushevina	2	1
(Belgium) K Flipkens	4	3
WC	(Belgium) J Henin	6	6
(Romania) S Cîrstea	6	2	6
WC	(Australia) O Rogowska	3	6	2
(Australia) J Dokić	1	5
27	(Russia) A Kleybanova	6	7
18	(France) V Razzano	2	3
(Russia) E Makarova	6	6
(Czech Republic) K Zakopalová	2	6^{5}
(Italy) S Errani	6	7^{7}
Q	(Belgium) Y Wickmayer	1	7	10
(Romania) A Dulgheru	6	5	8
(Russia) A Chakvetadze	3	6	2
12	(Italy) F Pennetta	6	3	6

Second round
5	(Russia) E Dementieva	5	6^{6}
WC	(Belgium) J Henin	7	7^{8}
(Romania) S Cîrstea	4	3
27	(Russia) A Kleybanova	6	6
(Russia) E Makarova	2	3
(Italy) S Errani	6	6
Q	(Belgium) Y Wickmayer	7^{7}	6
12	(Italy) F Pennetta	6^{2}	1

Third round
WC	(Belgium) J Henin	3	6	6
27	(Russia) A Kleybanova	6	4	2
(Italy) S Errani	1	7^{7}	3
Q	(Belgium) Y Wickmayer	6	6^{4}	6

Fourth round
WC	(Belgium) J Henin	7^{7}	1	6
Q	(Belgium) Y Wickmayer	6^{3}	6	3

==== Section 6 ====
First round
15	(Belgium) K Clijsters	6	6
Q	(Canada) V Tétreault	0	4
WC	(Kazakhstan) S Karatantcheva	1	6^{0}
(Thailand) T Tanasugarn	6	7^{7}
(Chinese Taipei) Y-j Chan	6^{4}	2
(Estonia) K Kanepi	7^{7}	6
(Romania) E Gallovits	3	4
19	(Russia) N Petrova	6	6
26	(France) A Rezaï	6	6
(India) S Mirza	4	2
(Belarus) O Govortsova	3	3
Q	(Germany) A Kerber	6	6
(Russia) A Pavlyuchenkova	6	6
(Latvia) A Sevastova	2	4
(Australia) An Rodionova	1	2
3	(Russia) S Kuznetsova	6	6

Second round
15	(Belgium) K Clijsters	6	6
(Thailand) T Tanasugarn	3	3
(Estonia) K Kanepi	4	4
19	(Russia) N Petrova	6	6
26	(France) A Rezaï	2	3
Q	(Germany) A Kerber	6	6
(Russia) A Pavlyuchenkova	2	2
3	(Russia) S Kuznetsova	6	6

Third round
15	(Belgium) K Clijsters	0	1
19	(Russia) N Petrova	6	6
Q	(Germany) A Kerber	6	5	4
3	(Russia) S Kuznetsova	3	7	6

Fourth round
19	(Russia) N Petrova	6	3	6
3	(Russia) S Kuznetsova	3	6	1

==== Section 7 ====
First round
8	(Serbia) J Janković	6	6
(Romania) M Niculescu	4	0
(Austria) P Mayr	3	3
(United Kingdom) K O'Brien	6	6
Q	(Ukraine) Y Fedak	4	0
(Slovenia) P Hercog	6	6
Q	(Germany) K Wörle	2	2
31	(Ukraine) A Bondarenko	6	6
24	(Spain) MJ Martínez Sánchez	6	6
(Russia) E Rodina	0	0
(China) J Zheng	0	6	6
(China) S Peng	6	1	2
WC	(United States) C Vandeweghe	0	1
(Czech Republic) S Záhlavová	6	6
(Paraguay) R de los Ríos	4	1
11	(France) M Bartoli	6	6

Second round
8	(Serbia) J Janković	6	6
(United Kingdom) K O'Brien	2	2
(Slovenia) P Hercog	4	5
31	(Ukraine) A Bondarenko	6	7
24	(Spain) MJ Martínez Sánchez	6	2	3
(China) J Zheng	2	6	6
(Czech Republic) S Záhlavová	4	4
11	(France) M Bartoli	6	6

Third round
8	(Serbia) J Janković	2	3
31	(Ukraine) A Bondarenko	6	6
(China) J Zheng	5	6	6
11	(France) M Bartoli	7	3	0

Fourth round
31	(Ukraine) A Bondarenko	6^{5}	4
(China) J Zheng	7^{7}	6

==== Section 8 ====
First round
14	(Russia) M Sharapova	6^{4}	6	4
(Russia) M Kirilenko	7^{7}	3	6
Q	(Austria) Y Meusburger	6	4	6
(Switzerland) T Bacsinszky	4	6	2
(Germany) A-L Grönefeld	5	4
(Italy) R Vinci	7	6
(United States) V King	6	6^{5}	7
23	(Slovakia) D Cibulková	3	7^{7}	5
30	(Ukraine) K Bondarenko	6	7^{8}
(Romania) R Olaru	2	6^{6}
(France) P Parmentier	4	6	5
(United Kingdom) E Baltacha	6	3	7
(Czech Republic) B Záhlavová-Strýcová	7^{7}	6^{10}	6
Q	(Russia) R Kulikova	6^{5}	7^{12}	3
(Slovakia) M Rybáriková	4	4
2	(Russia) D Safina	6	6

Second round
(Russia) M Kirilenko	6	6
Q	(Austria) Y Meusburger	3	1
(Italy) R Vinci	7^{9}	7
(United States) V King	6^{7}	5
30	(Ukraine) K Bondarenko	2	5
(United Kingdom) E Baltacha	6	7
(Czech Republic) B Záhlavová-Strýcová	3	4
2	(Russia) D Safina	6	6

Third round
(Russia) M Kirilenko	7	7^{7}
(Italy) R Vinci	5	6^{4}
(United Kingdom) E Baltacha	1	2
2	(Russia) D Safina	6	6

Fourth round
(Russia) M Kirilenko	5
2	(Russia) D Safina	4^{r}

== Championship match statistics ==
Category	(United States) S. Williams	(Belgium) Henin
1st serve %	62/98 (63%)	39/76 (51%)
1st serve points won	37 of 62 = 60%	23 of 39 = 59%
2nd serve points won	17 of 36 = 47%	17 of 37 = 46%
Total service points won	54 of 98 = 55.10%	40 of 76 = 52.63%
Aces	12	4
Double faults	3	6
Winners	32	28
Unforced errors	37	32
Net points won	5 of 14 = 36%	8 of 15 = 53%
Break points converted	6 of 11 = 55%	5 of 16 = 31%
Return points won	36 of 76 = 47%	44 of 98 = 45%
Total points won	90	84

Preceded by 2009 US Open – Women's singles	Grand Slam women's singles	Succeeded by 2010 French Open – Women's singles
