= 2007 US Open – Women's singles qualifying =

Women's singles qualifying
- 2007 US Open

Events
Singles	men	women		boys	girls
Doubles	men	women	mixed	boys	girls
WC Singles	men	women	quad
WC Doubles	men	women	quad
Legends	men	women	mixed

Qualification
Singles	men	women
- US Open

This article displays the qualifying draw for the Women's Singles at the 2007 US Open.

== Seeds ==
1. (United States) Lilia Osterloh (first round)
2. (China) Yan Zi (qualified)
3. (France) Alizé Cornet (qualified)
4. (Uzbekistan) Akgul Amanmuradova (first round)
5. (Germany) Andrea Petkovic (moved to main draw)
6. (Luxembourg) Anne Kremer (qualifying competition)
7. (France) Pauline Parmentier (qualified)
8. (Ukraine) Yuliana Fedak (first round)
9. (France) Youlia Fedossova (second round)
10. (Switzerland) Emmanuelle Gagliardi (qualified)
11. (Germany) Sandra Klösel (qualified)
12. (Argentina) Jorgelina Cravero (qualified)
13. (Argentina) María Emilia Salerni (second round)
14. (France) Stéphanie Foretz (qualifying competition)
15. (Czech Republic) Renata Voráčová (qualified)
16. (Canada) Stéphanie Dubois (qualifying competition)
17. (Czech Republic) Hana Šromová (second round)
18. (Chinese Taipei) Hsieh Su-wei (qualifying competition)
19. (Slovenia) Andreja Klepač (qualified)
20. (Uzbekistan) Varvara Lepchenko (second round)
21. (Russia) Galina Voskoboeva (second round)
22. (Czech Republic) Petra Cetkovská (qualified)
23. (China) Sun Tiantian (second round)
24. (Bulgaria) Tsvetana Pironkova (qualified)
25. (Hungary) Melinda Czink (qualifying competition)
26. (Czech Republic) Eva Birnerová (first round)
27. (Belarus) Anastasiya Yakimova (first round)
28. (United Kingdom) Katie O'Brien (first round)
29. (Hungary) Kira Nagy (qualified)
30. (Romania) Sorana Cîrstea (first round)
31. (China) Yuan Meng (first round)
32. (Germany) Julia Görges (qualified)
33. (Croatia) Nika Ožegović (first round)

== Qualifiers ==
1. (Ukraine) Tatiana Perebiynis
2. (China) Yan Zi
3. (France) Alizé Cornet
4. (Czech Republic) Petra Cetkovská
5. (Russia) Alina Jidkova
6. (Germany) Julia Görges
7. (France) Pauline Parmentier
8. (France) Olivia Sanchez
9. (Slovenia) Andreja Klepač
10. (Switzerland) Emmanuelle Gagliardi
11. (Germany) Sandra Klösel
12. (Argentina) Jorgelina Cravero
13. (Hungary) Kira Nagy
14. (Russia) Ekaterina Makarova
15. (Czech Republic) Renata Voráčová
16. (Bulgaria) Tsvetana Pironkova

== Qualifying draw ==
Key

- Q = Qualifier
- WC = Wild card
- LL = Lucky loser
- Alt = Alternate
- ITF = ITF entry
- PR = Protected ranking
- SR = Special ranking
- SE = Special exempt
- JE = Junior exempt
- JR = Junior Accelerator Programme entrant
- CO = College Accelerator Programme entrant
- NG = Next Gen Accelerator Program entrant
- w/o = Walkover
- r = Retired
- d = Defaulted

=== First qualifier ===
First round
1	(United States) Lilia Osterloh	6	5	2
(Ukraine) Tatiana Perebiynis	0	7	6
(Paraguay) Rossana de los Ríos	0	3
(Spain) Carla Suárez Navarro	6	6
(United States) Raquel Kops-Jones	6	2	6
(Slovenia) Maša Zec Peškirič	3	6	0
(Japan) Akiko Yonemura	0	1
23	(China) Sun Tiantian	6	6

Second round
(Ukraine) Tatiana Perebiynis	6	2	6
(Spain) Carla Suárez Navarro	1	6	3
(United States) Raquel Kops-Jones	6	6
23	(China) Sun Tiantian	3	4

Qualifying competition
(Ukraine) Tatiana Perebiynis	7^{7}	6
(United States) Raquel Kops-Jones	6^{3}	3

=== Second qualifier ===
First round
2	(China) Yan Zi	6	3	7^{7}
(Germany) Angelika Bachmann	2	6	6^{4}
(Netherlands) Brenda Schultz-McCarthy	7^{7}	5	4
(Finland) Emma Laine	6^{0}	7	6
(Romania) Monica Niculescu	6	2	2
(United States) Sunitha Rao	2	6	6
(Germany) Angelika Rösch	2	3
20	(Uzbekistan) Varvara Lepchenko	6	6

Second round
2	(China) Yan Zi	6	7^{9}
(Finland) Emma Laine	3	6^{7}
(United States) Sunitha Rao	7	6
20	(Uzbekistan) Varvara Lepchenko	5	0

Qualifying competition
2	(China) Yan Zi	6	6
(United States) Sunitha Rao	4	4

=== Third qualifier ===
First round
3	(France) Alizé Cornet	6	6
(South Africa) Chanelle Scheepers	2	4
PR	(Spain) Marta Marrero	6	6
(Hungary) Zsófia Gubacsi	4	1
WC	(United States) Melanie Oudin	6	6
(Japan) Ayumi Morita	2	0
(Russia) Regina Kulikova	6	6
27	(Belarus) Anastasiya Yakimova	1	1

Second round
3	(France) Alizé Cornet	6	6
PR	(Spain) Marta Marrero	2	2
WC	(United States) Melanie Oudin	1	1
(Russia) Regina Kulikova	6	6

Qualifying competition
3	(France) Alizé Cornet	6	6
(Russia) Regina Kulikova	3	3

=== Fourth qualifier ===
First round
4	(Uzbekistan) Akgul Amanmuradova	4	6	3
(Germany) Vanessa Henke	6	3	6
(Czech Republic) Sandra Záhlavová	3	0
(United Kingdom) Anne Keothavong	6	6
(Japan) Kumiko Iijima	3	4
(Czech Republic) Lucie Hradecká	6	6
(United States) Abigail Spears	6	5	2
22	(Czech Republic) Petra Cetkovská	2	7	6

Second round
(Germany) Vanessa Henke	2	0
(United Kingdom) Anne Keothavong	6	6
(Czech Republic) Lucie Hradecká	3	3
22	(Czech Republic) Petra Cetkovská	6	6

Qualifying competition
(United Kingdom) Anne Keothavong	3	0^{r}
22	(Czech Republic) Petra Cetkovská	6	3

=== Fifth qualifier ===
First round
33	(Croatia) Nika Ožegović	2	6	6^{3}
(Russia) Alina Jidkova	6	1	7^{7}
(France) Julie Coin	7	4	6
(France) Virginie Pichet	5	6	4
PR	(Japan) Rika Fujiwara	3	2
(Czech Republic) Eva Hrdinová	6	6
(Brazil) Maria Fernanda Alves	6	2	4
18	(Chinese Taipei) Hsieh Su-wei	4	6	6

Second round
(Russia) Alina Jidkova	7^{7}	6
(France) Julie Coin	6^{3}	4
(Czech Republic) Eva Hrdinová	5	5
18	(Chinese Taipei) Hsieh Su-wei	7	7

Qualifying competition
(Russia) Alina Jidkova	6	5	7^{7}
18	(Chinese Taipei) Hsieh Su-wei	2	7	6^{4}

=== Sixth qualifier ===
First round
6	(Luxembourg) Anne Kremer	6	4	6
(Czech Republic) Andrea Hlaváčková	4	6	3
(Japan) Junri Namigata	6	6
(Czech Republic) Barbora Strýcová	2	1
WC	(France) Violette Huck	2	2
(China) Zhang Shuai	6	6
(Republic of Ireland) Kelly Liggan	3	3
32	(Germany) Julia Görges	6	6

Second round
6	(Luxembourg) Anne Kremer	6	6
(Japan) Junri Namigata	4	4
(China) Zhang Shuai	5	3
32	(Germany) Julia Görges	7	6

Qualifying competition
6	(Luxembourg) Anne Kremer	3	4
32	(Germany) Julia Görges	6	6

=== Seventh qualifier ===
First round
7	(France) Pauline Parmentier	6	4	6
(United States) Angela Haynes	1	6	4
(Canada) Marie-Ève Pelletier	1
(Tunisia) Selima Sfar	0^{r}
(Poland) Joanna Sakowicz	6	2	3
(Germany) Carmen Klaschka	3	6	6
(Ukraine) Viktoriya Kutuzova	6	7
26	(Czech Republic) Eva Birnerová	0	5

Second round
7	(France) Pauline Parmentier	6	6
(Canada) Marie-Ève Pelletier	3	4
(Germany) Carmen Klaschka	6^{5}	0
(Ukraine) Viktoriya Kutuzova	7^{7}	6

Qualifying competition
7	(France) Pauline Parmentier	3	6	7^{7}
(Ukraine) Viktoriya Kutuzova	6	2	6^{4}

=== Eighth qualifier ===
First round
8	(Ukraine) Yuliana Fedak	6^{3}	3
(France) Olivia Sanchez	7^{7}	6
(Puerto Rico) Kristina Brandi	6	5	3
(Uzbekistan) Iroda Tulyaganova	1	7	6
PR	(United Kingdom) Elena Baltacha	2	4
(Russia) Evgeniya Rodina	6	6
(Russia) Eugenia Grebenyuk	0	4
17	(Czech Republic) Hana Šromová	6	6

Second round
(France) Olivia Sanchez	6	6
(Uzbekistan) Iroda Tulyaganova	4	3
(Russia) Evgeniya Rodina	6	7
17	(Czech Republic) Hana Šromová	4	5

Qualifying competition
(France) Olivia Sanchez	4	6	6
(Russia) Evgeniya Rodina	6	1	4

=== Ninth qualifier ===
First round
9	(France) Youlia Fedossova	6^{5}	7^{7}	6
PR	(Luxembourg) Mandy Minella	7^{7}	6^{5}	3
(Georgia (country)) Margalita Chakhnashvili	4	7^{7}	6
(Italy) Nathalie Viérin	6	6^{4}	4
(Spain) María José Martínez Sánchez	6	4	7
WC	(United States) Coco Vandeweghe	2	6	5
Alt	(United States) Neha Uberoi	3	2
19	(Slovenia) Andreja Klepač	6	6

Second round
9	(France) Youlia Fedossova	1	2
(Georgia (country)) Margalita Chakhnashvili	6	6
(Spain) María José Martínez Sánchez	6^{3}	3
19	(Slovenia) Andreja Klepač	7^{7}	6

Qualifying competition
(Georgia (country)) Margalita Chakhnashvili	4	4
19	(Slovenia) Andreja Klepač	6	6

=== Tenth qualifier ===
First round
10	(Switzerland) Emmanuelle Gagliardi	6	6
(Brazil) Jenifer Widjaja	1	3
(Australia) Monique Adamczak	4	7^{13}	7
(Belarus) Darya Kustova	6	6^{11}	5
(New Zealand) Marina Erakovic	6	6
WC	(United States) Hilary Barte	2	4
(Serbia) Vojislava Lukić	4	1
21	(Russia) Galina Voskoboeva	6	6

Second round
10	(Switzerland) Emmanuelle Gagliardi	6^{3}	6	6
(Australia) Monique Adamczak	7^{7}	4	2
(New Zealand) Marina Erakovic	6	6
21	(Russia) Galina Voskoboeva	4	4

Qualifying competition
10	(Switzerland) Emmanuelle Gagliardi	7^{7}	6
(New Zealand) Marina Erakovic	6^{5}	3

=== Eleventh qualifier ===
First round
11	(Germany) Sandra Klösel	6	6
(Belarus) Ekaterina Dzehalevich	0	4
(Spain) Nuria Llagostera Vives	7^{7}	4	3
(Czech Republic) Petra Kvitová	6^{4}	6	6
(Chinese Taipei) Chuang Chia-jung	4	0
(United Kingdom) Naomi Cavaday	6	6
(Romania) Anda Perianu	2	7^{7}	6
31	(China) Yuan Meng	6	6^{2}	4

Second round
11	(Germany) Sandra Klösel	7	6
(Czech Republic) Petra Kvitová	5	3
(United Kingdom) Naomi Cavaday	6^{4}	6	7^{7}
(Romania) Anda Perianu	7^{7}	3	6^{5}

Qualifying competition
11	(Germany) Sandra Klösel	4	6	6
(United Kingdom) Naomi Cavaday	6	1	1

=== Twelfth qualifier ===
First round
12	(Argentina) Jorgelina Cravero	6	6
WC	(Georgia (country)) Anna Tatishvili	3	1
(Russia) Ekaterina Ivanova	6	6
(Australia) Christina Wheeler	1	3
(Ukraine) Mariya Koryttseva	1	3
(Estonia) Maret Ani	6	6
WC	(United States) Asia Muhammad	2	2
25	(Hungary) Melinda Czink	6	6

Second round
12	(Argentina) Jorgelina Cravero	6	6
(Russia) Ekaterina Ivanova	2	4
(Estonia) Maret Ani	4	2
25	(Hungary) Melinda Czink	6	6

Qualifying competition
12	(Argentina) Jorgelina Cravero	6	6
25	(Hungary) Melinda Czink	3	4

=== Thirteenth qualifier ===
First round
13	(Argentina) María Emilia Salerni	6	6
(Belgium) Caroline Maes	4	1
(Japan) Seiko Okamoto	2	3
(South Africa) Natalie Grandin	6	6
(Argentina) Betina Jozami	2	2
WC	(Russia) Anastasia Pavlyuchenkova	6	6
(Croatia) Ivana Abramovic	6	2	4
29	(Hungary) Kira Nagy	3	6	6

Second round
13	(Argentina) María Emilia Salerni	7^{8}	2	2
(South Africa) Natalie Grandin	6^{6}	6	6
WC	(Russia) Anastasia Pavlyuchenkova	3	2
29	(Hungary) Kira Nagy	6	6

Qualifying competition
(South Africa) Natalie Grandin	6^{6}	4
29	(Hungary) Kira Nagy	7^{8}	6

=== Fourteenth qualifier ===
First round
14	(France) Stéphanie Foretz	7^{7}	6
WC	(United States) Lindsey Nelson	6^{5}	1
(Japan) Yurika Sema	6^{5}	4
(Belarus) Iryna Kuryanovich	7^{7}	4^{r}
(United Kingdom) Melanie South	6	1	4
(Russia) Ekaterina Makarova	4	6	6
(China) Sun Shengnan	6	6^{5}	6
28	(United Kingdom) Katie O'Brien	3	7^{7}	4

Second round
14	(France) Stéphanie Foretz	6	6
(Japan) Yurika Sema	2	2
(Russia) Ekaterina Makarova	6	7^{7}
(China) Sun Shengnan	3	6^{3}

Qualifying competition
14	(France) Stéphanie Foretz	2	1
(Russia) Ekaterina Makarova	6	6

=== Fifteenth qualifier ===
First round
15	(Czech Republic) Renata Voráčová	6	7^{7}
(Chinese Taipei) Chan Chin-wei	4	6^{4}
(Ukraine) Yuliya Beygelzimer	1	6	6
(Argentina) Paola Suárez	6	3	2
(Germany) Kathrin Wörle	3	0
(United States) Julie Ditty	6	6
WC	(United States) Alison Riske	6	7^{7}
30	(Romania) Sorana Cîrstea	2	6^{4}

Second round
15	(Czech Republic) Renata Voráčová	6	3
(Ukraine) Yuliya Beygelzimer	0	1^{r}
(United States) Julie Ditty	6	6
WC	(United States) Alison Riske	2	1

Qualifying competition
15	(Czech Republic) Renata Voráčová	6	6
(United States) Julie Ditty	3	2

=== Sixteenth qualifier ===
First round
16	(Canada) Stéphanie Dubois	6	3
(Netherlands) Elise Tamaëla	0	1^{r}
(Japan) Shiho Hisamatsu	2	2
(Argentina) María José Argeri	6	6
(Poland) Marta Domachowska	7	6
(Russia) Ekaterina Afinogenova	5	4
(Czech Republic) Zuzana Ondrášková	4	3
24	(Bulgaria) Tsvetana Pironkova	6	6

Second round
16	(Canada) Stéphanie Dubois	6	6
(Argentina) María José Argeri	3	2
(Poland) Marta Domachowska	0	6	4
24	(Bulgaria) Tsvetana Pironkova	6	4	6

Qualifying competition
16	(Canada) Stéphanie Dubois	6^{5}	6	2
24	(Bulgaria) Tsvetana Pironkova	7^{7}	1	6
