= 2007 US Open – Men's singles qualifying =

Men's singles qualifying
- 2007 US Open

Events
Singles	men	women		boys	girls
Doubles	men	women	mixed	boys	girls
WC Singles	men	women	quad
WC Doubles	men	women	quad
Legends	men	women	mixed

Qualification
Singles	men	women
- US Open

The US Open Men's Qualifying Tournament ran from 21 August 2007 to 24 August 2007. Sixteen players qualified for the main draw, which started on Monday 27 August 2007.

== Seeds ==
The seeded players are listed below. Players who have lost are listed with the round in which they exited.

1. (Canada) Frank Dancevic (qualified)
2. (Netherlands) Robin Haase (qualifying competition, lucky loser)
3. (Romania) Andrei Pavel (qualified)
4. (Germany) Michael Zverev (first round)
5. (Argentina) Juan Pablo Brzezicki (second round)
6. (France) Olivier Patience (first round)
7. (Italy) Fabio Fognini (qualifying competition)
8. (Netherlands) Raemon Sluiter (first round)
9. (United States) Bobby Reynolds (qualifying competition, lucky loser)
10. (Croatia) Marin Čilić (first round)
11. (Israel) Dudi Sela (qualified)
12. (Italy) Federico Luzzi (second round)
13. (Chile) Paul Capdeville (qualified)
14. (South Africa) Wesley Moodie (qualifying competition)
15. (Colombia) Alejandro Falla (second round)
16. (United Kingdom) Alex Bogdanovic (first round, retired)
17. (France) Thierry Ascione (qualified)
18. (Poland) Łukasz Kubot (qualifying competition)
19. (Uruguay) Pablo Cuevas (qualified)
20. (Czech Republic) Tomáš Zíb (first round)
21. (Belgium) Dick Norman (first round)
22. (Czech Republic) Lukáš Dlouhý (second round)
23. (Czech Republic) Jan Hernych (qualifying competition)
24. (United States) Zack Fleishman (first round)
25. (Belgium) Steve Darcis (qualified)
26. (Germany) Alexander Waske (qualified)
27. (Luxembourg) Gilles Müller (first round)
28. (Serbia) Viktor Troicki (first round)
29. (Chile) Adrián García (qualifying competition)
30. (Germany) Rainer Schüttler (qualified)
31. (South Africa) Rik de Voest (qualified)
32. (Germany) Björn Phau (qualified)

== Qualifiers ==
1. (Canada) Frank Dancevic
2. (Mexico) Bruno Echagaray
3. (Romania) Andrei Pavel
4. (Germany) Alexander Waske
5. (Belgium) Steve Darcis
6. (United States) Scoville Jenkins
7. (Germany) Rainer Schüttler
8. (Uruguay) Pablo Cuevas
9. (South Africa) Rik de Voest
10. (Germany) Dominik Meffert
11. (Israel) Dudi Sela
12. (Germany) Björn Phau
13. (Chile) Paul Capdeville
14. (France) Thierry Ascione
15. (Germany) Philipp Petzschner
16. (Poland) Michał Przysiężny

== Lucky losers ==
1. (United States) Bobby Reynolds
2. (Netherlands) Robin Haase

== Draw ==
Key

- Q = Qualifier
- WC = Wild card
- LL = Lucky loser
- Alt = Alternate
- ITF = ITF entry
- PR = Protected ranking
- SR = Special ranking
- SE = Special exempt
- JE = Junior exempt
- JR = Junior Accelerator Programme entrant
- CO = College Accelerator Programme entrant
- NG = Next Gen Accelerator Program entrant
- w/o = Walkover
- r = Retired
- d = Defaulted

=== First qualifier ===
First round
1	(Canada) Frank Dancevic	7^{7}	3	7
(Peru) Iván Miranda	6^{4}	6	5
(France) David Guez	6	6
(Austria) Martin Fischer	3	0
(Denmark) Kenneth Carlsen	6^{3}	5
PR	(United States) Eric Nunez	7^{7}	7
(Ukraine) Sergey Stakhovsky	4	4
23	(Czech Republic) Jan Hernych	6	6

Second round
1	(Canada) Frank Dancevic	6	6
(France) David Guez	1	3
PR	(United States) Eric Nunez	1^{r}
23	(Czech Republic) Jan Hernych	2

Qualifying Round
1	(Canada) Frank Dancevic	7	7^{8}
23	(Czech Republic) Jan Hernych	5	6^{6}

=== Second qualifier ===
First round
2	(Netherlands) Robin Haase	3	6	6
(France) Nicolas Tourte	6	1	4
PR	(Canada) Frédéric Niemeyer	6	6
(Switzerland) Michael Lammer	3	2
(United States) Brian Wilson	6	7^{7}
(Slovenia) Grega Žemlja	4	6^{5}
(Mexico) Bruno Echagaray	1	6	6
28	(Serbia) Viktor Troicki	6	1	4

Second round
2	(Netherlands) Robin Haase	2	7^{7}	6
PR	(Canada) Frédéric Niemeyer	6	6^{3}	3
(United States) Brian Wilson	4	5
(Mexico) Bruno Echagaray	6	7

Qualifying Round
2	(Netherlands) Robin Haase	7^{7}	5	3
(Mexico) Bruno Echagaray	6^{5}	7	6

=== Third qualifier ===
First round
3	(Romania) Andrei Pavel	7^{7}	7^{7}
(United States) Scott Oudsema	6^{3}	6^{5}
(South Korea) Kyu-Tae Im	7^{7}	7
(Czech Republic) Jan Mertl	6^{1}	5
(Slovakia) Lukáš Lacko	6	6
(Colombia) Michael Quintero	2	0
22	(Czech Republic) Lukáš Dlouhý	3	6	6
(Czech Republic) Pavel Šnobel	6	4	1

Second round
3	(Romania) Andrei Pavel	6	6
(South Korea) Kyu-Tae Im	4	4
(Slovakia) Lukáš Lacko	6	6
22	(Czech Republic) Lukáš Dlouhý	3	3

Qualifying Round
3	(Romania) Andrei Pavel	7	6
(Slovakia) Lukáš Lacko	5	4

=== Fourth qualifier ===
First round
4	(Germany) Michael Zverev	2	4
(Argentina) Eduardo Schwank	6	6
(United Kingdom) Richard Bloomfield	6	6
WC	(United States) Bryan Koniecko	3	1
(Czech Republic) Lukáš Rosol	6	6
(Brazil) Ricardo Mello	3	4
26	(Germany) Alexander Waske	6	6
(Italy) Marco Crugnola	0	2

Second round
(Argentina) Eduardo Schwank	7^{7}	6
(United Kingdom) Richard Bloomfield	6^{4}	2
(Czech Republic) Lukáš Rosol	4	4
26	(Germany) Alexander Waske	6	6

Qualifying Round
(Argentina) Eduardo Schwank	3	4
26	(Germany) Alexander Waske	6	6

=== Fifth qualifier ===
First round
5	(Argentina) Juan Pablo Brzezicki	6	6
(Australia) Nick Lindahl	2	1
(Brazil) Júlio Silva	6	6
(Germany) Denis Gremelmayr	3	1
(Czech Republic) Jan Minář	6^{4}	6	6
(Germany) Simon Stadler	7^{7}	2	4
25	(Belgium) Steve Darcis	6	6
(Israel) Noam Okun	4	3

Second round
5	(Argentina) Juan Pablo Brzezicki	2	5
(Brazil) Júlio Silva	6	7
(Czech Republic) Jan Minář	3	1
25	(Belgium) Steve Darcis	6	6

Qualifying Round
(Brazil) Júlio Silva	3	7^{7}	2
25	(Belgium) Steve Darcis	6	6^{2}	6

=== Sixth qualifier ===
First round
6	(France) Olivier Patience	6	5	5
WC	(United States) Scoville Jenkins	3	7	7
(Israel) Harel Levy	6	0
PR	(Switzerland) Michel Kratochvil	2	0^{r}
(Brazil) Rogério Dutra da Silva	7^{7}	6
WC	(United States) Nikita Kryvonos	6^{4}	3
27	(Luxembourg) Gilles Müller	6^{5}	6^{7}
(Pakistan) Aisam-ul-Haq Qureshi	7^{7}	7^{9}

Second round
WC	(United States) Scoville Jenkins	5	6	6
(Israel) Harel Levy	7	4	3
(Brazil) Rogério Dutra da Silva	4	1
(Pakistan) Aisam-ul-Haq Qureshi	6	6

Qualifying Round
WC	(United States) Scoville Jenkins	6^{2}	6	0
(Pakistan) Aisam-ul-Haq Qureshi	7^{7}	2	0^{r}

=== Seventh qualifier ===
First round
7	(Italy) Fabio Fognini	6	6
(Germany) Lars Burgsmüller	0	1
(Argentina) Horacio Zeballos	6	6
(Serbia) Ilija Bozoljac	3	3
(Czech Republic) Jan Vacek	6	6
(France) Laurent Recouderc	4	1
WC	(Czech Republic) Dušan Lojda	0	0
30	(Germany) Rainer Schüttler	6	6

Second round
7	(Italy) Fabio Fognini	7	6
(Argentina) Horacio Zeballos	5	4
(Czech Republic) Jan Vacek	3	6	3
30	(Germany) Rainer Schüttler	6	3	6

Qualifying Round
7	(Italy) Fabio Fognini	4	5
30	(Germany) Rainer Schüttler	6	7

=== Eighth qualifier ===
First round
8	(Netherlands) Raemon Sluiter	3	4
(Slovakia) Michal Mertiňák	6	6
(United States) Brendan Evans	6	1	4
(United Kingdom) Jamie Baker	2	6	6
(India) Rohan Bopanna	6	6
(France) Julien Jeanpierre	2	2
(Spain) Adrian Menendez	2	2
19	(Uruguay) Pablo Cuevas	6	6

Second round
(Slovakia) Michal Mertiňák	4	2
(United Kingdom) Jamie Baker	6	6
(India) Rohan Bopanna	4	7^{11}	5
19	(Uruguay) Pablo Cuevas	6	6^{9}	7

Qualifying Round
(United Kingdom) Jamie Baker	6^{6}	3
19	(Uruguay) Pablo Cuevas	7^{8}	6

=== Ninth qualifier ===
First round
9	(United States) Bobby Reynolds	6	6^{3}	6
(Australia) Joseph Sirianni	1	7^{7}	3
(Belgium) Stefan Wauters	6	6
(Netherlands) Peter Wessels	3	4
(Germany) Benedikt Dorsch	6	6
(Spain) Marc Fornell	4	3
(United States) Kevin Kim	4	2
31	(South Africa) Rik de Voest	6	6

Second round
9	(United States) Bobby Reynolds	6	6
(Belgium) Stefan Wauters	1	1
(Germany) Benedikt Dorsch	3	5
31	(South Africa) Rik de Voest	6	7

Qualifying Round
9	(United States) Bobby Reynolds	3	6^{4}
31	(South Africa) Rik de Voest	6	7^{7}

=== Tenth qualifier ===
First round
10	(Croatia) Marin Čilić	6^{5}	6^{2}
(Japan) Go Soeda	7^{7}	7^{7}
(Latvia) Andis Juška	6	6
(France) Antony Dupuis	3	3
WC	(United States) Phillip Simmonds	6	5	2
(Sweden) Michael Ryderstedt	4	7	6
(Germany) Dominik Meffert	4	7^{7}	6
20	(Czech Republic) Tomáš Zíb	6	6^{4}	4

Second round
(Japan) Go Soeda	6	3	7
(Latvia) Andis Juška	4	6	5
(Sweden) Michael Ryderstedt	3	6^{6}
(Germany) Dominik Meffert	6	7^{8}

Qualifying Round
(Japan) Go Soeda	3	3
(Germany) Dominik Meffert	6	6

=== Eleventh qualifier ===
First round
11	(Israel) Dudi Sela	6	6^{3}	7^{7}
(Australia) Nathan Healey	4	7^{7}	6^{4}
WC	(United States) Ryler DeHeart	6^{4}	7	6
WC	(United States) Lester Cook	7^{7}	5	4
(United States) Alex Bogomolov	6	3	6
(Chinese Taipei) Yeu-Tzuoo Wang	3	6	4
(Switzerland) George Bastl	2	6^{6}
29	(Chile) Adrián García	6	7^{8}

Second round
11	(Israel) Dudi Sela	6	6
WC	(United States) Ryler DeHeart	3	3
(United States) Alex Bogomolov	5	1
29	(Chile) Adrián García	7	6

Qualifying Round
11	(Israel) Dudi Sela	6	6
29	(Chile) Adrián García	0	1

=== Twelfth qualifier ===
First round
12	(Italy) Federico Luzzi	7	7
(Colombia) Santiago Giraldo	5	5
(France) Jean-Christophe Faurel	2	6	3
(Spain) Gabriel Trujillo	6	3	6
(Japan) Kei Nishikori	3	6	6
(India) Prakash Amritraj	6	1	4
WC	(United States) Stephen Bass	4	7	4
32	(Germany) Björn Phau	6	5	6

Second round
12	(Italy) Federico Luzzi	3	1
(Spain) Gabriel Trujillo	6	6
(Japan) Kei Nishikori	2	4
32	(Germany) Björn Phau	6	6

Qualifying Round
(Spain) Gabriel Trujillo	1	6	2
32	(Germany) Björn Phau	6	3	6

=== Thirteenth qualifier ===
First round
13	(Chile) Paul Capdeville	6	6
(United States) Rajeev Ram	4	4
(Serbia) Dušan Vemić	6	3	6
(Czech Republic) Tomáš Cakl	3	6	4
(United States) Jesse Witten	7	6
(Brazil) Thomaz Bellucci	5	1
(Croatia) Roko Karanušić	6	6
24	(United States) Zack Fleishman	4	2

Second round
13	(Chile) Paul Capdeville	6^{3}	6	7
(Serbia) Dušan Vemić	7^{7}	2	5
(United States) Jesse Witten	2	4
(Croatia) Roko Karanušić	6	6

Qualifying Match
13	(Chile) Paul Capdeville	4	6	6
(Croatia) Roko Karanušić	6	4	1

=== Fourteenth qualifier ===
First round
14	(South Africa) Wesley Moodie	6	7^{7}
(Japan) Takao Suzuki	3	6^{1}
(Brazil) Thiago Alves	6^{6}	2
(Argentina) Brian Dabul	7^{8}	6
(United States) Hugo Armando	6	3	6
(Italy) Leonardo Azzaro	3	6	3
(France) Gary Lugassy	3	5
17	(France) Thierry Ascione	6	7

Second round
14	(South Africa) Wesley Moodie	6	7^{7}
(Argentina) Brian Dabul	2	6^{5}
(United States) Hugo Armando	4	6	4
17	(France) Thierry Ascione	6	3	6

Qualifying Round
14	(South Africa) Wesley Moodie	7^{8}	6^{3}	3
17	(France) Thierry Ascione	6^{6}	7^{7}	6

=== Fifteenth qualifier ===
First round
15	(Colombia) Alejandro Falla	6	6
WC	(United States) Matthew Bruch	3	1
(Slovakia) Kamil Čapkovič	6^{5}	2
(Austria) Alexander Peya	7^{7}	6
(Argentina) Leonardo Mayer	6^{6}	6	6
(Spain) Marcel Granollers	7^{8}	4	4
(Germany) Philipp Petzschner	7^{7}	6
21	(Belgium) Dick Norman	6^{3}	3

Second round
15	(Colombia) Alejandro Falla	1	2
(Austria) Alexander Peya	6	6
(Argentina) Leonardo Mayer	3	0
(Germany) Philipp Petzschner	6	6

Qualifying Round
(Austria) Alexander Peya	5	1
(Germany) Philipp Petzschner	7	6

=== Sixteenth qualifier ===
First round
16	(United Kingdom) Alex Bogdanovic	0^{r}
(Australia) Robert Smeets	3
(Italy) Paolo Lorenzi	3	4
(Poland) Michał Przysiężny	6	6
(United States) Sam Warburg	6	7^{8}
(Greece) Konstantinos Economidis	4	6^{6}
PR	(United States) Glenn Weiner	3	6^{3}
18	(Poland) Łukasz Kubot	6	7^{7}

Second round
(Australia) Robert Smeets	3	2
(Poland) Michał Przysiężny	6	6
(United States) Sam Warburg	4	0^{r}
18	(Poland) Łukasz Kubot	6	1

Qualifying Round
(Poland) Michał Przysiężny	6^{4}	6	7^{7}
18	(Poland) Łukasz Kubot	7^{7}	3	6^{0}
