= 2007 US Open – Boys' singles =

Boys' singles
- 2007 US Open

Final
- Champion: (Lithuania) Ričardas Berankis
- Runner-up: (Poland) Jerzy Janowicz
- Score: 6–3, 6–4

Events
Singles	men	women		boys	girls
Doubles	men	women	mixed	boys	girls
WC Singles	men	women	quad
WC Doubles	men	women	quad
Legends	men	women	mixed
- US Open

The United States Open Tennis Championships is a hardcourt tennis tournament held annually at Flushing Meadows, starting on the last Monday in August and lasting for two weeks. The tournament consists of five main championship events: men's and women's singles, men's and women's doubles, and mixed doubles, with additional tournaments for seniors, juniors, and wheelchair players.

In 2007, the boys' singles event was won by Ričardas Berankis of Lithuania who beat Jerzy Janowicz of Poland, 6–3, 6–4 in the final.

== Seeds ==
The seeded players are listed below. They are shown by the round in which they were eliminated.

1. (Belarus) Uladzimir Ignatik (quarterfinals)
2. N.A.
3. (Italy) Matteo Trevisan (semifinals)
4. (Brazil) Fernando Romboli (first round)
5. (Australia) Greg Jones (quarterfinals)
6. (France) Jonathan Eysseric (second round)
7. (France) Stéphane Piro (second round)
8. (Czech Republic) Roman Jebavý (quarterfinals)
9. (United States) Rhyne Williams (third round)
10. (Chile) Ricardo Urzua-Rivera (first round)
11. (Italy) Thomas Fabbiano (semifinals)
12. (Australia) John-Patrick Smith (second round)
13. (Australia) Stephen Donald (first round)
14. (Brazil) Henrique Cunha (first round)
15. (Lithuania) Ričardas Berankis (champion)
16. (Chile) Guillermo Rivera Aránguiz (first round)
17. (Moldova) Radu Albot (third round)

== Draw ==
Key

- Q = Qualifier
- WC = Wild card
- LL = Lucky loser
- Alt = Alternate
- ITF = ITF entry
- PR = Protected ranking
- SR = Special ranking
- SE = Special exempt
- JE = Junior exempt
- JR = Junior Accelerator Programme entrant
- CO = College Accelerator Programme entrant
- NG = Next Gen Accelerator Program entrant
- w/o = Walkover
- r = Retired
- d = Defaulted

=== Final eight ===
Quarterfinals
1	(Belarus) Uladzimir Ignatik	4	2
11	(Italy) Thomas Fabbiano	6	6
(Poland) Jerzy Janowicz	3	7^{8}	6
5	(Australia) Greg Jones	6	6^{6}	3
(United Kingdom) Daniel Evans	4	5
3	(Italy) Matteo Trevisan	6	7
8	(Czech Republic) Roman Jebavý	4	3
15	(Lithuania) Ričardas Berankis	6	6

Semifinals
11	(Italy) Thomas Fabbiano	2	7^{7}	6^{1}
(Poland) Jerzy Janowicz	6	6^{2}	7^{7}
3	(Italy) Matteo Trevisan	6^{3}	4
15	(Lithuania) Ričardas Berankis	7^{7}	6

Final
(Poland) Jerzy Janowicz	3	4
15	(Lithuania) Ričardas Berankis	6	6

=== Top half ===
==== Section 1 ====
First round
1	(Belarus) Uladzimir Ignatik	6	6
(Germany) Jaan-Frederik Brunken	1	2
(Egypt) Mohamed Safwat	2	7	4
SE	(Canada) Vasek Pospisil	6	5	6
(United States) Johnny Hamui	4	2
(Thailand) Peerakiat Siriluethaiwattana	6	6
WC	(United States) Jeff Dadamo	6	6
13	(Australia) Stephen Donald	1	2
11	(Italy) Thomas Fabbiano	7^{7}	6
(United Kingdom) Daniel Cox	6^{3}	4
(Russia) Evgeny Donskoy	7^{9}	6
Q	(United States) Devin Britton	6^{7}	4
WC	(United States) Ty Trombetta	3	4
(Cyprus) Andrew Thomas	6	6
(Belgium) Frédéric De Fays	7^{8}	3	4
6	(France) Jonathan Eysseric	6^{6}	6	6

Second round
1	(Belarus) U Ignatik	6	6
SE	(Canada) V Pospisil	3	4
(Thailand) P Siriluethaiwarrana	5	7	7^{8}
WC	(United States) J Dadamo	7	5	6^{6}
11	(Italy) T Fabbiano	6	6
(Russia) E Donskoy	4	0
(Cyprus) A Thomas	5	7	6
6	(France) J Eysseric	7	5	4

Third round
1	(Belarus) U Ignatik	6	3
(Thailand) P Siriluethaiwarrana	3	0^{r}
11	(Italy) T Fabbiano	3	6	6
(Cyprus) A Thomas	6	3	2

Quarterfinal
1	(Belarus) U Ignatik	4	2
11	(Italy) T Fabbiano	6	6

==== Section 2 ====
First round
4	(Brazil) Fernando Romboli	0	7^{9}	4
LL	(Australia) Bernard Tomic	6	6^{7}	6
(United Kingdom) David Rice	3	2
WC	(United States) Lawrence Formentera	6	6
(Poland) Jerzy Janowicz	6	7
(Czech Republic) Jiří Košler	4	5
Q	(Russia) Vladimir Zinyakov	7^{8}	6
16	(Chile) Guillermo Rivera Aránguiz	6^{6}	3
9	(United States) Rhyne Williams	6	3	6
(Mexico) César Ramírez	4	6	1
(Paraguay) Daniel-Alejandro Lopez	4	4
(Portugal) Gastão Elias	6	6
WC	(United States) Ryan Harrison	4	4
Q	(Slovenia) Borut Puc	6	6
WC	(United States) Tennys Sandgren	6	2	6^{5}
5	(Australia) Greg Jones	4	6	7^{7}

Second round
LL	(Australia) B Tomic	6	7
WC	(United States) L Formentera	3	5
(Poland) J Janowicz	7^{7}	3	6
Q	(Russia) V Zinyakov	6^{5}	6	4
9	(United States) R Williams	6	6
(Portugal) G Elias	4	4
Q	(Slovenia) B Puc	7^{7}	1	6^{3}
5	(Australia) G Jones	6^{4}	6	7^{7}

Third round
LL	(Australia) B Tomic	5	6	3
(Poland) J Janowicz	7	3	6
9	(United States) R Williams	6	6^{3}	4
5	(Australia) G Jones	4	7^{7}	6

Quarterfinal
(Poland) J Janowicz	3	7^{8}	6
5	(Australia) G Jones	6	6^{6}	3

=== Bottom half ===
==== Section 3 ====
First round
7	(France) Stéphane Piro	6	6
(Venezuela) Roberto Maytín	1	4
Q	(Australia) Jared Easton	2	1
WC	(United States) Ryan Thacher	6	6
Q	(United States) Bradley Klahn	2	4
(United Kingdom) Daniel Evans	6	6
(Bulgaria) Grigor Dimitrov	6	6
10	(Chile) Ricardo Urzua-Rivera	4	1
14	(Brazil) Henrique Cunha	6	5	6^{5}
(Slovenia) Aljaž Bedene	2	7	7^{7}
Q	(United States) Frank Carleton	6	6
(Finland) Harri Heliövaara	2	4
(Colombia) Alejandro González	6^{3}	6	3
(United States) Austin Krajicek	7^{7}	2	6
(South Korea) Soong-Jae Cho	4	3
3	(Italy) Matteo Trevisan	6	6

Second round
7	(France) S Piro	4	3
WC	(United States) R Thacher	6	6
(United Kingdom) D Evans	6	6
(Bulgaria) G Dimitrov	2	3
(Slovenia) A Bedene	7	6
Q	(United States) F Carleton	5	4
(United States) A Krajicek	4	6	3
3	(Italy) M Trevisan	6	3	6

Third round
WC	(United States) R Thacher	4	6^{3}
(United Kingdom) D Evans	6	7^{7}
(Slovenia) A Bedene	3	2
3	(Italy) M Trevisan	6	6

Quarterfinal
(United Kingdom) D Evans	4	5
3	(Italy) M Trevisan	6	7

==== Section 4 ====
First round
8	(Czech Republic) Roman Jebavý	6	6
(Belarus) Andrei Karatchenia	2	1
(France) Jérôme Inzerillo	6	6
(Belgium) Germain Gigounon	2	1
Q	(Italy) Giacomo Miccini	7	4	0
Q	(United States) Dennis Nevolo	5	6	6
(Thailand) Kittipong Wachiramanowong	7	5	3^{r}
12	(Australia) John-Patrick Smith	5	7	4
15	(Lithuania) Ričardas Berankis	6	6
WC	(United States) James Bo Seal	3	2
WC	(United States) Alexander Domijan	6^{4}	5
(Zimbabwe) Takanyi Garanganga	7^{7}	2^{r}
LL	(Serbia) Ilija Vucić	6	4	1
(United Kingdom) Graeme Dyce	3	6	6
(Chile) Cristóbal Saavedra Corvalán	5	4
17	(Moldova) Radu Albot	7	6

Second round
8	(Czech Republic) R Jebavý	6	7^{7}
(France) J Inzerillo	3	6^{1}
Q	(United States) D Nevolo	6	2	6
12	(Australia) J-P Smith	2	6	4
15	(Lithuania) R Berankis	6	6
WC	(United States) A Domijan	0	2
(United Kingdom) G Dyce	6	3	1
17	(Moldova) R Albot	4	6	6

Third round
8	(Czech Republic) R Jebavý	5	6	6
Q	(United States) D Nevolo	7	0	2
15	(Lithuania) R Berankis	6	7^{7}
17	(Moldova) R Albot	2	6^{2}

Quarterfinal
8	(Czech Republic) R Jebavý	4	3
15	(Lithuania) R Berankis	6	6
