= 2007 US Open – Wheelchair men's singles =

Wheelchair men's singles
- 2007 US Open

Final
- Champion: (Japan) Shingo Kunieda
- Runner-up: (Netherlands) Robin Ammerlaan
- Score: 6–2, 6–2

Events
Singles	men	women		boys	girls
Doubles	men	women	mixed	boys	girls
WC Singles	men	women	quad
WC Doubles	men	women	quad
Legends	men	women	mixed
← 2006 ·	US Open	· 2009 →

Shingo Kunieda defeated the two-time defending champion Robin Ammerlaan in the final, 6–2, 6–2 to win the men's singles wheelchair tennis title at the 2007 US Open. It was his first US Open singles title and third major singles title overall.

== Seeds ==
1. (Japan) Shingo Kunieda (champion)
2. (Netherlands) Robin Ammerlaan (final)

== Draw ==
=== Key ===
- Q = Qualifier
- WC = Wild card
- LL = Lucky loser
- Alt = Alternate
- ITF = ITF entry
- PR = Protected ranking
- SR = Special ranking
- SE = Special exempt
- JE = Junior exempt
- JR = Junior Accelerator Programme entrant
- CO = College Accelerator Programme entrant
- NG = Next Gen Accelerator Program entrant
- w/o = Walkover
- r = Retired
- d = Defaulted

=== Finals ===
First round
1	(Japan) Shingo Kunieda	6	6
(Japan) Satoshi Saida	0	2
(Poland) Tadeusz Kruszelnicki	4	5
(United States) Jon Rydberg	6	7
(France) Stéphane Houdet	6	6
(France) Michaël Jeremiasz	3	3
(Netherlands) Ronald Vink	6^{5}	5
2	(Netherlands) Robin Ammerlaan	7^{7}	7

Second round
1	(Japan) Shingo Kunieda	6	7
(United States) Jon Rydberg	0	5
(France) Stéphane Houdet	6	2	4
2	(Netherlands) Robin Ammerlaan	0	6	6

Finals
1	(Japan) Shingo Kunieda	6	6
2	(Netherlands) Robin Ammerlaan	2	2
