= 2007 US Open – Wheelchair men's doubles =

Wheelchair men's doubles
- 2007 US Open

Final
- Champion: (Japan) Shingo Kunieda (Japan) Satoshi Saida
- Runner-up: (Netherlands) Robin Ammerlaan (France) Michaël Jeremiasz
- Score: 6–3, 6–2

Events
| Singles | men | women | | boys | girls |
| Doubles | men | women | mixed | boys | girls |
| WC Singles | men | women | quad |
| WC Doubles | men | women | quad |
| Legends | men | women | mixed |
| ← 2006 · | US Open | · 2009 → |

Shingo Kunieda and Satoshi Saida defeated the two-time defending champions Robin Ammerlaan and Michaël Jeremiasz in the final, 6–3, 6–2 to win the men's doubles wheelchair tennis title at the 2007 US Open.

== Seeds ==
1. (Japan) Shingo Kunieda / (Japan) Satoshi Saida (champions)
2. (Netherlands) Robin Ammerlaan/ (France) Michaël Jeremiasz (finals)

== Doubles ==
=== Key ===
- Q = Qualifier
- WC = Wild card
- LL = Lucky loser
- Alt = Alternate
- ITF = ITF entry
- PR = Protected ranking
- SR = Special ranking
- SE = Special exempt
- JE = Junior exempt
- JR = Junior Accelerator Programme entrant
- CO = College Accelerator Programme entrant
- NG = Next Gen Accelerator Program entrant
- w/o = Walkover
- r = Retired
- d = Defaulted

=== Finals ===
First round
1 | (Japan) Shingo Kunieda (Japan) Satoshi Saida | 6 | 6
(Poland) Tadeusz Kruszelnicki (United States) Jon Rydberg | 1 | 1
(France) Stéphane Houdet (Netherlands) Ronald Vink | 4 | 3
2 | (Netherlands) Robin Ammerlaan (France) Michaël Jeremiasz | 6 | 6

Finals
1 | (Japan) Shingo Kunieda (Japan) Satoshi Saida | 6 | 6
2 | (Netherlands) Robin Ammerlaan (France) Michaël Jeremiasz | 3 | 2
