= 2007 US Open – Girls' singles =

Girls' singles
- 2007 US Open

Final
- Champion: (Slovakia) Kristína Kučová
- Runner-up: (Poland) Urszula Radwańska
- Score: 6–3, 1–6, 7–6^{(7–4)}

Events
Singles	men	women		boys	girls
Doubles	men	women	mixed	boys	girls
WC Singles	men	women	quad
WC Doubles	men	women	quad
Legends	men	women	mixed
- US Open

The United States Open Tennis Championships is a hardcourt tennis tournament held annually at Flushing Meadows, starting on the last Monday in August and lasting for two weeks. The tournament consists of five main championship events: men's and women's singles, men's and women's doubles, and mixed doubles, with additional tournaments for seniors, juniors, and wheelchair players.

In 2007, the girls' singles event was won by Kristína Kučová of the Slovak Republic who beat Urszula Radwańska of Poland, 6–3, 1–6, 7–6^{(7–4)} in the final.

== Seeds ==
The seeded players are listed below. They are shown by the round in which they were eliminated.

1. (Russia) Anastasia Pavlyuchenkova (Quarterfinal)
2. (Poland) Urszula Radwańska (finalist)
3. (United States) Madison Brengle (first round)
4. (Austria) Nikola Hofmanova (first round)
5. (Russia) Ksenia Pervak (second round)
6. (United States) Julia Cohen (first round)
7. (Belarus) Ksenia Milevskaya (semifinals)
8. (United States) Lauren Albanese (Quarterfinal)
9. (Chinese Taipei) Chang Kai-chen (first round)
10. (Russia) Ksenia Lykina (third round)
11. (Serbia) Bojana Jovanovski (second round)
12. (Israel) Julia Glushko (third round)
13. (Slovakia) Reka Zsilinszka (first round)
14. (Russia) Elena Chernyakova (second round)
15. (Poland) Katarzyna Piter (third round)

== Draw ==
Key

- Q = Qualifier
- WC = Wild card
- LL = Lucky loser
- Alt = Alternate
- ITF = ITF entry
- PR = Protected ranking
- SR = Special ranking
- SE = Special exempt
- JE = Junior exempt
- JR = Junior Accelerator Programme entrant
- CO = College Accelerator Programme entrant
- NG = Next Gen Accelerator Program entrant
- w/o = Walkover
- r = Retired
- d = Defaulted

=== Finals ===
Quarterfinals
1	(Russia) A Pavlyuchenkova	5	1
(Slovakia) K Kučová	7	6
(Georgia (country)) O Kalashnikova	1	6	6
(New Zealand) S Jones	6	2	3
7	(Belarus) K Milevskaya	7^{7}	6
(Australia) J Moore	6^{5}	2
8	(United States) L Albanese	1	0^{r}
2	(Poland) U Radwańska	6	1

Semifinals
(Slovakia) K Kučová	7	6
(Georgia (country)) O Kalashnikova	5	1
7	(Belarus) K Milevskaya	6	2	4
2	(Poland) U Radwańska	3	6	6

Final
(Slovakia) K Kučová	6	1	7^{7}
2	(Poland) U Radwańska	3	6	6^{4}

=== Top half ===
==== Section 1 ====
First round
1	(Russia) Anastasia Pavlyuchenkova	6	6
(United States) Gail Brodsky	4	1
WC	(United States) Melanie Oudin	6	6
(Liechtenstein) Stephanie Vogt	4	4
(Uzbekistan) Aleksandra Kolesnichenko	6	1	1
WC	(United States) Alison Riske	4	6	6
(Morocco) Nadia Lalami	4	0
15	(Poland) Katarzyna Piter	6	6
12	(Israel) Julia Glushko	6	4	7
Q	(United States) Allie Will	3	6	5
Q	(United Kingdom) Tara Moore	6	2	3
(Australia) Johanna Konta	1	6	6
(Japan) Kurumi Nara	2	2
(Slovakia) Kristína Kučová	6	6
(Slovenia) Polona Hercog	6	6
6	(United States) Julia Cohen	3	2

Second round
1	(Russia) A Pavlyuchenkova	6	6
WC	(United States) M Oudin	2	2
WC	(United States) A Riske	1	4
15	(Poland) K Piter	6	6
12	(Israel) J Glushko	7	6
(Australia) J Konta	5	3
(Slovakia) K Kučová	6	4	6
(Slovenia) P Hercog	0	6	1

Third round
1	(Russia) A Pavlyuchenkova	6	6
15	(Poland) K Piter	2	0
12	(Israel) J Glushko	3	0
(Slovakia) K Kučová	6	6

Quarterfinal
1	(Russia) A Pavlyuchenkova	5	1
(Slovakia) K Kučová	7	6

==== Section 2 ====
First round
4	(Austria) Nikola Hofmanova	4	4
(Australia) Tyra Calderwood	6	6
(Portugal) Michelle Larcher de Brito	2	3
(Romania) Simona Halep	6	6
(France) Cindy Chala	6	6
Q	(United States) Chelsey Gullickson	1	2
(Georgia (country)) Oksana Kalashnikova	6	6
13	(Slovakia) Reka Zsilinszka	1	2
9	(Chinese Taipei) Chang Kai-chen	2	6	3
WC	(United States) Ashley Weinhold	6	4	6
(Argentina) Tatiana Búa	3	3
(Slovakia) Romana Tabaková	6	6
(United States) Veronica Li	3	2
(New Zealand) Sacha Jones	6	6
WC	(United States) Christina McHale	1	3
5	(Russia) Ksenia Pervak	6	6

Second round
(Australia) T Calderwood	4	6	3
(Romania) S Halep	6	4	6
(France) C Chala	6^{2}	0
(Georgia (country)) O Kalashnikova	7^{7}	6
WC	(United States) A Weinhold	6	6
(Slovakia) R Tabaková	4	3
(New Zealand) S Jones	5	7	6
5	(Russia) K Pervak	7	5	3

Third round
(Romania) S Halep	5	4
(Georgia (country)) O Kalashnikova	7	6
WC	(United States) A Weinhold	1	3
(New Zealand) S Jones	6	6

Quarterfinal
(Georgia (country)) O Kalashnikova	1	6	6
(New Zealand) S Jones	6	2	3

=== Bottom half ===
==== Section 3 ====
First round
7	(Belarus) Ksenia Milevskaya	6	6
(Belgium) Tamaryn Hendler	1	1
(United Kingdom) Jade Curtis	6	6
(Slovakia) Lenka Juríková	2	2
(Japan) Shiho Akita	1	3
Q	(United States) Kimberly Couts	6	6
WC	(United States) Asia Muhammad	5	5
11	(Serbia) Bojana Jovanovski	7	7
14	(Russia) Elena Chernyakova	4	6	6
WC	(United States) Lilly Kimbell	6	4	3
WC	(Russia) Valeria Solovieva	2	3
(United States) CoCo Vandeweghe	6	6
(Romania) Ioana Ivan	4	4
Q	(Italy) Nastassja Burnett	6	6
(Australia) Jessica Moore	6	6
3	(United States) Madison Brengle	4	2

Second round
7	(Belarus) K Milevskaya	6	6
(United Kingdom) J Curtis	2	1
Q	(United States) K Couts	6	4	6
11	(Serbia) B Jovanovski	4	6	1
14	(Russia) E Chernyakova	6^{2}	0
(United States) C Vandeweghe	7^{7}	6
Q	(Italy) N Burnett	4	4
(Australia) J Moore	6	6

Third round
7	(Belarus) K Milevskaya	6	7^{7}
Q	(United States) K Couts	3	6^{5}
(United States) C Vandeweghe	4	6	3
(Australia) J Moore	6	4	6

Quarterfinal
7	(Belarus) K Milevskaya	7^{7}	6
(Australia) J Moore	6^{52}	2

==== Section 4 ====
First round
8	(United States) Lauren Albanese	6	4	6
(Slovakia) Klaudia Boczová	3	6	2
(Thailand) Noppawan Lertcheewakarn	2	6	6^{5}
(United States) Mallory Cecil	6	1	7^{7}
(India) Poojashree Venkatesha	3	2
(South Korea) Sung-Hee Han	6	6
Q	(United States) Stephanie Vidov	2	2
10	(Russia) Ksenia Lykina	6	6
LL	(Russia) Yana Buchina	3	5
(Mexico) Valeria Pulido	6	7
Q	(United States) Alexa Guarachi	5	2
Q	(Croatia) Jasmina Tinjić	7	6
(France) Nelly Ciolkowski	6	6
(Argentina) Malena Gordo	2	3
(United States) Tanya Raykova	4	1
2	(Poland) Urszula Radwańska	6	6

Second round
8	(United States) L Albanese	6	6
(United States) M Cecil	3	2
(South Korea) S-H Han	3	3
10	(Russia) K Lykina	6	6
(Mexico) V Pulido
Q	(Croatia) J Tinjić	w	/	o
(France) N Ciolkowski	3	1
2	(Poland) U Radwańska	6	6

Third round
8	(United States) L Albanese	6	2	6
10	(Russia) K Lykina	3	6	4
(Mexico) V Pulido	0	3
2	(Poland) U Radwańska	6	6

Quarterfinal
8	(United States) L Albanese	1	0	r
2	(Poland) U Radwańska	6	1
