= 2007 US Open – Mixed champions invitational =

Mixed champions invitational
- 2007 US Open

Final
- Champions: (Belarus) Natasha Zvereva (Ecuador) Andrés Gómez (United States) Anne Smith (United States) Stan Smith

Events
| Singles | men | women | | boys | girls |
| Doubles | men | women | mixed | boys | girls |
| WC Singles | men | women | quad |
| WC Doubles | men | women | quad |
| Legends | men | women | mixed |
| ← 2006 · | US Open | · 2008 → |

The Mixed Champions Invitational (mixed doubles) event at the 2007 US Open tennis tournament was won by Natasha Zvereva / Andrés Gómez and Anne Smith / Stan Smith.

== Draw ==
=== Key ===
- Q = Qualifier
- WC = Wild card
- LL = Lucky loser
- Alt = Alternate
- ITF = ITF entry
- PR = Protected ranking
- SR = Special ranking
- SE = Special exempt
- JE = Junior exempt
- JR = Junior Accelerator Programme entrant
- CO = College Accelerator Programme entrant
- NG = Next Gen Accelerator Program entrant
- w/o = Walkover
- r = Retired
- d = Defaulted

=== Round robin ===
| | Team | Fernández; Wheaton | Fernandez; Washington | Zvereva; Gómez |
| 1 | (United States) G Fernández (United States) D Wheaton (1-1) | | FER/WHE; 6-1, 6-4 | ZVE/GOM; 3-6, 5-4 rtd. |
| 2 | (United States) MJ Fernández (United States) MV Washington (0-2) | FER/WHE; 6-1, 6-4 | | ZVE/GOM; 4-6, 6-3, 12-10 |
| 3 | (Belarus) N Zvereva (Ecuador) A Gómez (2-0) | ZVE/GOM; 3-6, 5-4 rtd. | ZVE/GOM; 4-6, 6-3, 12-10 | |

| | Team | Kloss; Vilas | Mandlíková; Năstase | Smith; Smith |
| 1 | (South Africa) I Kloss (Argentina) G Vilas (1-1) | | KLO/VIL; 3-1 rtd. | SMI/SMI; 7-6 (5), 3-6, 13-11 |
| 2 | (Czech Republic) H Mandlíková (Romania) I Năstase (0-2) | KLO/VIL; 3-1 rtd. | | SMI/SMI; 6-3, 6-1 |
| 3 | (United States) A Smith (United States) S Smith (2-0) | SMI/SMI; 7-6 (5), 3-6, 13-11 | SMI/SMI; 6-3, 6-1 | |
