= 2007 US Open – Wheelchair women's doubles =

Wheelchair women's doubles
- 2007 US Open

Final
- Champions: (Netherlands) Jiske Griffioen (Netherlands) Esther Vergeer
- Runners-up: (Netherlands) Korie Homan (Netherlands) Sharon Walraven
- Score: 6–1, 6–1

Events
Singles	men	women		boys	girls
Doubles	men	women	mixed	boys	girls
WC Singles	men	women	quad
WC Doubles	men	women	quad
Legends	men	women	mixed
← 2006 ·	US Open	· 2009 →

Defending champions Jiske Griffioen and Esther Vergeer defeated Korie Homan and Sharon Walraven in the final, 6–1, 6–1, to retain the women's wheelchair doubles tennis title at the 2007 US Open.

== Seeds ==
1. (Netherlands) Jiske Griffioen / (Netherlands) Esther Vergeer (champions)
2. (Netherlands) Korie Homan / (Netherlands) Sharon Walraven (finals)

== Draw ==
=== Key ===
- Q = Qualifier
- WC = Wild card
- LL = Lucky loser
- Alt = Alternate
- ITF = ITF entry
- PR = Protected ranking
- SR = Special ranking
- SE = Special exempt
- JE = Junior exempt
- JR = Junior Accelerator Programme entrant
- CO = College Accelerator Programme entrant
- NG = Next Gen Accelerator Program entrant
- w/o = Walkover
- r = Retired
- d = Defaulted

=== Finals ===
First round
1	(Netherlands) Jiske Griffioen (Netherlands) Esther Vergeer	6	6
(United States) Beth Arnoult-Ritthaler (France) Florence Gravellier	3	0
(South Korea) Hong Young-Suk (Japan) Mie Yaosa	6	1	2
2	(Netherlands) Korie Homan (Netherlands) Sharon Walraven	4	6	6

Finals
1	(Netherlands) Jiske Griffioen (Netherlands) Esther Vergeer	6	6
2	(Netherlands) Korie Homan (Netherlands) Sharon Walraven	1	1
