= 2007 US Open – Boys' doubles =

Boys' doubles
- 2007 US Open

Final
- Champion: (France) Jonathan Eysseric (France) Jérôme Inzerillo
- Runner-up: (Bulgaria) Grigor Dimitrov (Canada) Vasek Pospisil
- Score: 6–2, 6–4

Events
Singles	men	women		boys	girls
Doubles	men	women	mixed	boys	girls
WC Singles	men	women	quad
WC Doubles	men	women	quad
Legends	men	women	mixed
- US Open

The 2007 US Open boys' doubles was an event that was won by Jonathan Eysseric and Jérôme Inzerillo who defeated Grigor Dimitrov and Vasek Pospisil in straight sets 6–2, 6–4.

== Seeds ==
1. (Belarus) Vladimir Ignatic / (Czech Republic) Roman Jebavý (semifinals)
2. (Australia) Stephen Donald / Greg Jones (semifinals)
3. (Brazil) Henrique Cunha / (Brazil) Fernando Romboli (first round)
4. (Italy) Daniel-Alejandro Lopez / (Italy) Matteo Trevisan (quarterfinals)
5. (Chile) Guillermo Rivera Aránguiz / (Chile) Ricardo Urzua-Rivera (first round)
6. (France) Jonathan Eysseric / (France) Jérôme Inzerillo (champions)
7. (Australia) John-Patrick Smith / (Australia) Andrew Thomas (first round)
8. (Italy) Tomas Fabbiano / (Belarus) Andrei Karatchenia (quarterfinals)

== Draw ==
Key

- Q = Qualifier
- WC = Wild card
- LL = Lucky loser
- Alt = Alternate
- ITF = ITF entry
- PR = Protected ranking
- SR = Special ranking
- SE = Special exempt
- JE = Junior exempt
- JR = Junior Accelerator Programme entrant
- CO = College Accelerator Programme entrant
- NG = Next Gen Accelerator Program entrant
- w/o = Walkover
- r = Retired
- d = Defaulted

=== Finals ===
Semifinals
1	(Belarus) Vladimir Ignatic (Czech Republic) Roman Jebavý	6^{2}	4
6	(France) Jonathan Eysseric (France) Jérôme Inzerillo	7^{7}	6
(Bulgaria) Grigor Dimitrov (Canada) Vasek Pospisil	4
2	(Australia) Stephen Donald (Australia) Greg Jones	0^{r}

Final
6	(France) Jonathan Eysseric (France) Jérôme Inzerillo	6	6
(Bulgaria) Grigor Dimitrov (Canada) Vasek Pospisil	2	4

=== Top half ===
First round
1	(Belarus) Vladimir Ignatic (Czech Republic) Roman Jebavý	6	6
(Belgium) Frederic De Feys (Belgium) Germain Gigounon	3	4
(Italy) Giacomo Miccini (Egypt) Mohamed Safwat	6^{6}	4
WC	(United States) Alexander Domijan (United States) Ty Trombetta	7^{8}	6
(United States) Jarmere Jenkins (United States) Austin Krajicek	6	6
(Czech Republic) Jiří Košler (Chile) Cristóbal Saavedra	2	2
(Moldova) Radu Albot (Russia) Evgeny Donskoy	6	6
7	(Australia) John-Patrick Smith (Australia) Andrew Thomas	3	3
4	(Italy) Daniel-Alejandro Lopez (Italy) Matteo Trevisan	6	6
(Germany) Jaan Frederik Brunken (Germany) Daniel Cox	1	2
(United States) Jeff Dadamo (United States) Johnny Hamui	3	1
(United Kingdom) Daniel Evans (United Kingdom) David Rice	6	6
WC	(United States) Lawrence Formentera (United States) Evan King	5	5
(Thailand) Perrakiat Siriluethaiwarrana (Russia) Vladimir Zinyakov	7	7
(Poland) Jerzy Janowicz (Slovenia) Borut Puc	6^{11}	2
6	(France) Jonathan Eysseric (France) Jérôme Inzerillo	7^{13}	6

Second round
1	(Belarus) V Ignatic (Czech Republic) R Jebavý	6	6
WC	(United States) A Domijan (United States) T Trombetta	3	4
(United States) J Jenkins (United States) A Krajicek	7	5	6^{5}
(Moldova) R Albot (Russia) E Donskoy	5	7	7^{7}
4	(Italy) D-A Lopez (Italy) M Trevisan	6	3	6
(United Kingdom) D Evans (United Kingdom) D Rice	3	6	4
(Thailand) P Siriluethaiwarrana (Russia) V Zinyakov	6	2	3
6	(France) J Eysseric (France) J Inzerillo	4	6	6

Quarterfinals
1	(Belarus) V Ignatic (Czech Republic) R Jebavý	6	6
(Moldova) R Albot (Russia) E Donskoy	3	4
4	(Italy) D-A Lopez (Italy) M Trevisan	3	0
6	(France) J Eysseric (France) J Inzerillo	6	6

Semifinals
1	(Belarus) V Ignatic (Czech Republic) R Jebavý	6^{2}	4
6	(France) J Eysseric (France) J Inzerillo	7^{7}	6

=== Bottom half ===
First round
8	(Italy) Thomas Fabbiano (Belarus) Andrei Karatchenia	4	6	6
(Portugal) Gastão Elias (Mexico) César Ramírez	6	4	4
WC	(United States) Tennys Sandgren (United States) James Bo Seal	6	6
(Australia) Bernard Tomic (Australia) Mark Verryth	2	4
(South Korea) Soong-Jae Cho (Thailand) Kittipong Wachiramanowong	3	4
(Bulgaria) Grigor Dimitrov (Canada) Vasek Pospisil	6	6
(United States) Bradley Klahn (United States) Dennis Nevolo	2	7	6
3	(Brazil) Henrique Cunha (Brazil) Fernando Romboli	6	5	3
5	(Chile) Guillermo Rivera Aránguiz (Chile) Ricardo Urzua-Rivera	6^{6}	4
(United States) Adam El Mihdawy (United States) Ryan Harrison	7^{8}	6
(United States) Devin Britton (Australia) Jared Easton	6	6
(Colombia) Alejandro González (Venezuela) Roberto Maytín	4	4
(Madagascar) Lofo Ramiaramanana (Zimbabwe) Takanyi Garanganga	7^{7}	4	3
(United Kingdom) Graeme Dyce (Finland) Harri Heliövaara	6^{3}	6	6
(Slovenia) Aljaž Bedene (Lithuania) Ričardas Berankis	3	2
2	(Australia) Stephen Donald (Australia) Greg Jones	6	6

Second round
8	(Italy) T Fabbiano (Belarus) A Karatchenia	6	6
WC	(United States) T Sandgren (United States) J B Seal	2	0
(Bulgaria) G Dimitrov (Canada) V Pospisil	6	6
(United States) B Klahn (United States) D Nevolo	2	3
(United States) A E Mihdawy (United States) R Harrison	2	6	1
(United States) D Britton (Australia) J Easton	6	3	6
(United Kingdom) G Dyce (Finland) H Heliövaara	5	3
2	(Australia) S Donald (Australia) G Jones	7	6

Quarterfinals
8	(Italy) T Fabbiano (Belarus) A Karatchenia	5	6	1
(Bulgaria) G Dimitrov (Canada) V Pospisil	7	4	6
(United States) D Britton (Australia) J Easton	0	3
2	(Australia) S Donald (Australia) G Jones	6	6

Semifinals
(Bulgaria) G Dimitrov (Canada) V Pospisil	4
2	(Australia) S Donald (Australia) G Jones	0^{r}
