= 2007 US Open – Men's doubles =

Men's doubles
- 2007 US Open

Final
- Champion: (Sweden) Simon Aspelin (Austria) Julian Knowle
- Runner-up: (Czech Republic) Lukáš Dlouhý (Czech Republic) Pavel Vízner
- Score: 7–5, 6–4

Details
- Draw: 64
- Seeds: 16

Events
Singles	men	women		boys	girls
Doubles	men	women	mixed	boys	girls
WC Singles	men	women	quad
WC Doubles	men	women	quad
Legends	men	women	mixed
← 2006 ·	US Open	· 2008 →

The 2007 US Open men's doubles tennis tournament was held from 27 August to 9 September 2007, at USTA Billie Jean King National Tennis Center at Flushing Meadows, New York City.

Martin Damm and Leander Paes were the defending champions, but lost in the first round to Julien Benneteau and Nicolas Mahut. Simon Aspelin and Julian Knowle won the title, defeating Lukáš Dlouhý and Pavel Vízner in the final, 7-5, 6-4.

== Seeds ==
1. (United States) Bob Bryan / (United States) Mike Bryan (quarterfinals)
2. (The Bahamas) Mark Knowles / (Canada) Daniel Nestor (quarterfinals)
3. (Sweden) Jonas Björkman / (Belarus) Max Mirnyi (third round)
4. (Czech Republic) Martin Damm / (India) Leander Paes (first round)
5. (Australia) Paul Hanley / (Zimbabwe) Kevin Ullyett (semifinals)
6. (India) Mahesh Bhupati / (Serbia) Nenad Zimonjić (second round)
7. (France) Arnaud Clément / (France) Michaël Llodra (second round)
8. (Israel) Jonathan Erlich / (Israel) Andy Ram (third round)
9. (Czech Republic) Lukáš Dlouhý / (Czech Republic) Pavel Vízner (final)
10. (Sweden) Simon Aspelin / (Austria) Julian Knowle (champions)
11. (Romania) Andrei Pavel / (Germany) Alexander Waske (second round)
12. (Poland) Mariusz Fyrstenberg / (Poland) Marcin Matkowski (third round)
13. (South Africa) Jeff Coetzee / (Netherlands) Rogier Wassen (third round)
14. (France) Fabrice Santoro / (South Africa) Wesley Moodie (first round)
15. (Czech Republic) František Čermák / (Czech Republic) Leoš Friedl (second round)
16. (United States) Eric Butorac / (United Kingdom) Jamie Murray (second round)

== Draw ==
=== Key ===
- Q = Qualifier
- WC = Wild card
- LL = Lucky loser
- Alt = Alternate
- ITF = ITF entry
- PR = Protected ranking
- SR = Special ranking
- SE = Special exempt
- JE = Junior exempt
- JR = Junior Accelerator Programme entrant
- CO = College Accelerator Programme entrant
- NG = Next Gen Accelerator Program entrant
- w/o = Walkover
- r = Retired
- d = Defaulted

=== Finals ===
Quarter-Finals
1	(United States) Bob Bryan (United States) Mike Bryan	5	4
10	(Sweden) Simon Aspelin (Austria) Julian Knowle	7	6
(France) Julien Benneteau (France) Nicolas Mahut	6	6
WC	(United States) Robert Kendrick (United States) Sam Querrey	3	4
5	(Australia) Paul Hanley (Zimbabwe) Kevin Ullyett	7	6
(Brazil) Marcelo Melo (Brazil) André Sá	5	3
9	(Czech Republic) Lukáš Dlouhý (Czech Republic) Pavel Vízner	6	6
2	(The Bahamas) Mark Knowles (Canada) Daniel Nestor	4	4

Semi-Finals
10	(Sweden) Simon Aspelin (Austria) Julian Knowle	7^{7}	1	6
(France) Julien Benneteau (France) Nicolas Mahut	6^{2}	6	3
5	(Australia) Paul Hanley (Zimbabwe) Kevin Ullyett	4	2
9	(Czech Republic) Lukáš Dlouhý (Czech Republic) Pavel Vízner	6	6

Final
10	(Sweden) Simon Aspelin (Austria) Julian Knowle	7	6
9	(Czech Republic) Lukáš Dlouhý (Czech Republic) Pavel Vízner	5	4

=== Top half ===
==== Section 1 ====
First round
1	(United States) B Bryan (United States) M Bryan	6	6
WC	(United States) J Isner (United States) S Oudsema	4	3
(Czech Republic) J Levinský (Australia) T Perry	6^{6}	6	2r
(Slovakia) M Mertiňák (Czech Republic) P Pála	7^{8}	3	5
(Argentina) S Roitman (Italy) P Starace	3	4
(Spain) M Granollers-Pujol (Spain) F López	6	6
(Argentina) J Acasuso (Argentina) J Mónaco	4	4
13	(South Africa) J Coetzee (Netherlands) R Wassen	6	6
10	(Sweden) S Aspelin (Austria) J Knowle	6	6
(Poland) Ł Kubot (Czech Republic) D Škoch	2	2
WC	(United States) R Ram (United States) D Young	4	6	4
(Argentina) A Calleri (Peru) L Horna	6	4	6
(United States) P Goldstein (United States) J Thomas	5	4
(Uruguay) P Cuevas (Austria) W Eschauer	7	6
(Australia) A Fisher (United States) B Reynolds	6	2	3
8	(Israel) J Erlich (Israel) A Ram	4	6	6

Second round
1	(United States) B Bryan (United States) M Bryan	6	6
(Slovakia) M Mertiňák (Czech Republic) P Pála	3	2
(Spain) M Granollers-Pujol (Spain) F López	5	3
13	(South Africa) J Coetzee (Netherlands) R Wassen	7	6
10	(Sweden) S Aspelin (Austria) J Knowle
(Argentina) A Calleri (Peru) L Horna	w	/	o
(Uruguay) P Cuevas (Austria) W Eschauer	3	2
8	(Israel) J Erlich (Israel) A Ram	6	6

Third round
1	(United States) B Bryan (United States) M Bryan	6	6
13	(South Africa) J Coetzee (Netherlands) R Wassen	1	4
10	(Sweden) S Aspelin (Austria) J Knowle	7	7^{7}
8	(Israel) J Erlich (Israel) A Ram	5	6^{4}

Quarterfinals
1	(United States) B Bryan (United States) M Bryan	5	4
10	(Sweden) S Aspelin (Austria) J Knowle	7	6

==== Section 2 ====
First round
4	(Czech Republic) M Damm (India) L Paes	7^{7}	3	4
(France) J Benneteau (France) N Mahut	6^{1}	6	6
(Germany) M Kohlmann (Germany) R Schüttler	6	7
(Germany) C Kas (Austria) A Peya	2	5
(Chile) N Massú (United States) V Spadea	6	1	6
(Argentina) M García (Argentina) S Prieto	2	6	3
(Australia) J Kerr (United States) T Phillips	6	7
14	(France) F Santoro (South Africa) W Moodie	1	5
11	(Romania) A Pavel (Germany) A Waske	7^{8}	6
(Argentina) D Hartfield (Spain) Ó Hernández	6^{6}	3
(France) F Serra (France) G Simon	6	6
(Spain) N Almagro (Spain) I Navarro Pastor	1	2
WC	(United States) R Kendrick (United States) S Querrey	6	6
(Czech Republic) T Cibulec (Czech Republic) C Suk	3	3
(Russia) I Kunitsyn (Russia) D Tursunov	3	5
6	(India) M Bhupathi (Serbia) N Zimonjić	6	7

Second round
(France) J Benneteau (France) N Mahut	6	6
(Germany) M Kohlmann (Germany) R Schüttler	4	2
(Chile) N Massú (United States) V Spadea	4	3
(Australia) J Kerr (United States) T Phillips	6	6
11	(Romania) A Pavel (Germany) A Waske	w	/	o
(France) F Serra (France) G Simon
WC	(United States) R Kendrick (United States) S Querrey	3	6	6
6	(India) M Bhupathi (Serbia) N Zimonjić	6	3	4

Third round
(France) J Benneteau (France) N Mahut	6	1	6
(Australia) J Kerr (United States) T Phillips	4	6	2
(France) F Serra (France) G Simon	3	1
WC	(United States) R Kendrick (United States) S Querrey	6	6

Quarterfinals
(France) J Benneteau (France) N Mahut	6	6
WC	(United States) R Kendrick (United States) S Querrey	3	4

=== Bottom half ===
==== Section 3 ====
First round
5	(Australia) P Hanley (Zimbabwe) K Ullyett	6	6
(France) M Gicquel (Belgium) O Rochus	4	2
(South Korea) Lee HT (United States) T Parrott	3	7	7^{7}
(Italy) S Bolelli (Croatia) I Ljubičić	6	5	6^{1}
(United Kingdom) J Auckland (Germany) B Becker	6	4	2
(South Africa) C Haggard (Sweden) T Johansson	3	6	6
(France) S Grosjean (Serbia) J Tipsarević	6^{4}	3
12	(Poland) M Fyrstenberg (Poland) M Matkowski	7^{7}	6
15	(Czech Republic) F Čermák (Czech Republic) L Friedl	4	6	6
(Spain) A Montañés (Spain) R Ramírez Hidalgo	6	1	4
WC	(United States) R Ginepri (Brazil) G Kuerten	6^{5}	2
(Brazil) M Melo (Brazil) A Sá	7^{7}	6
(Sweden) R Lindstedt (Finland) J Nieminen	7^{7}	6
(France) PH Mathieu (France) É Roger-Vasselin	6^{3}	3
WC	(United States) K Damico (United States) N Schnugg	4	2
3	(Sweden) J Björkman (Belarus) M Mirnyi	6	6

Second round
5	(Australia) P Hanley (Zimbabwe) K Ullyett	6^{5}	7	6
(South Korea) Lee HT (United States) T Parrott	7^{7}	5	2
(South Africa) C Haggard (Sweden) T Johansson	4	5
12	(Poland) M Fyrstenberg (Poland) M Matkowski	6	7
15	(Czech Republic) F Čermák (Czech Republic) L Friedl	6^{2}	6^{4}
(Brazil) M Melo (Brazil) A Sá	7^{7}	7^{7}
(Sweden) R Lindstedt (Finland) J Nieminen	3	0
3	(Sweden) J Björkman (Belarus) M Mirnyi	6	6

Third round
5	(Australia) P Hanley (Zimbabwe) K Ullyett	7^{7}	7^{7}
12	(Poland) M Fyrstenberg (Poland) M Matkowski	6^{5}	6^{4}
(Brazil) M Melo (Brazil) A Sá	6	6
3	(Sweden) J Björkman (Belarus) M Mirnyi	3	4

Quarterfinals
5	(Australia) P Hanley (Zimbabwe) K Ullyett	7	6
(Brazil) M Melo (Brazil) A Sá	5	3

==== Section 4 ====
First round
7	(France) A Clément (France) M Llodra	6	6
(Germany) P Kohlschreiber (Austria) S Koubek	3	3
WC	(United States) A Kuznetsov (United States) J Levine	6	6
(Slovakia) D Hrbatý (Israel) H Levy	1	4
(Italy) A Seppi (Spain) F Verdasco	1	4
(Russia) T Gabashvili (Croatia) I Karlović	6	6
(United States) S Lipsky (United States) D Martin	6	4	3
9	(Czech Republic) L Dlouhý (Czech Republic) P Vízner	1	6	6
16	(United States) E Butorac (United Kingdom) J Murray	4	7	6
(Germany) T Behrend (Germany) F Mayer	6	5	3
(Netherlands) R Haase (Austria) J Melzer	3	6^{5}
(United States) A Delić (United States) J Gimelstob	6	7^{7}
(Switzerland) Y Allegro (Belgium) K Vliegen	6	6
WC	(United States) S Jenkins (United States) P Simmonds	3	3
Alt	(Italy) L Azzaro (Italy) F Volandri	1	2
2	(The Bahamas) M Knowles (Canada) D Nestor	6	6

Second round
7	(France) A Clément (France) M Llodra	6^{5}	4
WC	(United States) A Kuznetsov (United States) J Levine	7^{7}	6
(Russia) T Gabashvili (Croatia) I Karlović	4	6^{5}
9	(Czech Republic) L Dlouhý (Czech Republic) P Vízner	6	7^{7}
16	(United States) E Butorac (United Kingdom) J Murray	5	3
(United States) A Delić (United States) J Gimelstob	7	6
(Switzerland) Y Allegro (Belgium) K Vliegen	7^{7}	4	1
2	(The Bahamas) M Knowles (Canada) D Nestor	6^{4}	6	6

Third round
WC	(United States) A Kuznetsov (United States) J Levine	4	5
9	(Czech Republic) L Dlouhý (Czech Republic) P Vízner	6	7
(United States) A Delić (United States) J Gimelstob	3	6^{4}
2	(The Bahamas) M Knowles (Canada) D Nestor	6	7^{7}

Quarterfinals
9	(Czech Republic) L Dlouhý (Czech Republic) P Vízner	6	6
2	(The Bahamas) M Knowles (Canada) D Nestor	4	4

== See also ==
- List of tennis tournaments
