= 2007 US Open – Women's champions invitational =

Women's champions invitational
- 2007 US Open

Final
- Champions: (Spain) Conchita Martínez (Czech Republic) Jana Novotná

Events
Singles	men	women		boys	girls
Doubles	men	women	mixed	boys	girls
WC Singles	men	women	quad
WC Doubles	men	women	quad
Legends	men	women	mixed
← 2006 ·	US Open	· 2008 →

The Women's Champions Invitational was a round-robin tournament played at the 2007 US Open tennis championships in New York City, USA. Four former tennis champions ("Legends") – Iva Majoli of Croatia, Conchita Martínez of Spain, Martina Navratilova of the US, and Jana Novotná of the Czech Republic – played off against one another to determine the winner. Martínez and Novotná tied for the championship.

== Draw ==
=== Key ===
- Q = Qualifier
- WC = Wild card
- LL = Lucky loser
- Alt = Alternate
- ITF = ITF entry
- PR = Protected ranking
- SR = Special ranking
- SE = Special exempt
- JE = Junior exempt
- JR = Junior Accelerator Programme entrant
- CO = College Accelerator Programme entrant
- NG = Next Gen Accelerator Program entrant
- w/o = Walkover
- r = Retired
- d = Defaulted

=== Round robin ===
		(Croatia) Majoli	(Spain) Martínez	(United States) Navratilova	(Czech Republic) Novotná
1	(Croatia) Iva Majoli (0-2)		MAR; 6-2, 6-4	N/A	NOV; 6-2, 6-4
2	(Spain) Conchita Martínez (2-1)	MAR; 6-2, 6-4		MAR; 3-6, 7-5, [10]-[7]	NOV; 6-2, r
3	(United States) Martina Navratilova (1-1)		MAR; 3-6, 7-5, [10]-[7]		NAV; 5-7, 7-5, [10]-[8]
4	(Czech Republic) Jana Novotná (2-1)	NOV; 6-2, 6-4	NOV; 6-2, r	NAV; 5-7, 7-5, [10]-[8]	

== Champions ==
- (Spain) Conchita Martínez and (Czech Republic) Jana Novotná
