= 2007 US Open – Men's singles =

Men's singles
- 2007 US Open

Final
- Champion: (Switzerland) Roger Federer
- Runner-up: (Serbia) Novak Djokovic
- Score: 7–6^{(7–4)}, 7–6^{(7–2)}, 6–4

Details
- Draw: 128
- Seeds: 32

Events
| Singles | men | women | | boys | girls |
| Doubles | men | women | mixed | boys | girls |
| WC Singles | men | women | quad |
| WC Doubles | men | women | quad |
| Legends | men | women | mixed |
- US Open

Three-time defending champion Roger Federer defeated Novak Djokovic in the final, 7–6^{(7–4)}, 7–6^{(7–2)}, 6–4 to win the men's singles tennis title at the 2007 US Open. It was his fourth US Open title and twelfth major title overall. With the win, Federer marked his third year in which he won three of the four majors. Also, he reached a record-equaling 14th consecutive major quarterfinal (streak starting at the 2004 Wimbledon Championships), matching Roy Emerson and Ivan Lendl. It was Djokovic's first major final, and the first of an eventual record 38 singles major finals.

== Seeds ==
1. (Switzerland) Roger Federer (champion)
2. (Spain) Rafael Nadal (fourth round)
3. (Serbia) Novak Djokovic (final)
4. (Russia) Nikolay Davydenko (semifinals)
5. (United States) Andy Roddick (quarterfinals)
6. (United States) James Blake (fourth round)
7. (Chile) Fernando González (first round)
8. (Spain) Tommy Robredo (third round)
9. (Czech Republic) Tomáš Berdych (fourth round, retired due to an illness)
10. (Germany) Tommy Haas (quarterfinals)
11. (Russia) Mikhail Youzhny (second round)
12. (Croatia) Ivan Ljubičić (third round)
13. (France) Richard Gasquet (second round, withdrew due to an illness)
14. (Argentina) Guillermo Cañas (second round)
15. (Spain) David Ferrer (semifinals)
16. (Australia) Lleyton Hewitt (second round)

17. (Spain) Carlos Moyá (quarterfinals)
18. (Cyprus) Marcos Baghdatis (first round)
19. (United Kingdom) Andy Murray (third round)
20. (Argentina) Juan Ignacio Chela (quarterfinals)
21. (Spain) Juan Carlos Ferrero (first round)
22. (France) Paul-Henri Mathieu (first round)
23. (Argentina) Juan Mónaco (fourth round)
24. (Argentina) David Nalbandian (third round)
25. (Russia) Marat Safin (second round)
26. (Finland) Jarkko Nieminen (first round)
27. (Russia) Dmitry Tursunov (first round)
28. (Spain) Nicolás Almagro (third round)
29. (Italy) Filippo Volandri (first round)
30. (Italy) Potito Starace (first round)
31. (Austria) Jürgen Melzer (second round)
32. (Croatia) Ivo Karlović (first round)

Click on the seed number of a player to go to their draw section.

== Draw ==
Key

- Q = Qualifier
- WC = Wild card
- LL = Lucky loser
- Alt = Alternate
- ITF = ITF entry
- PR = Protected ranking
- SR = Special ranking
- SE = Special exempt
- JE = Junior exempt
- JR = Junior Accelerator Programme entrant
- CO = College Accelerator Programme entrant
- NG = Next Gen Accelerator Program entrant
- w/o = Walkover
- r = Retired
- d = Defaulted

=== Finals ===
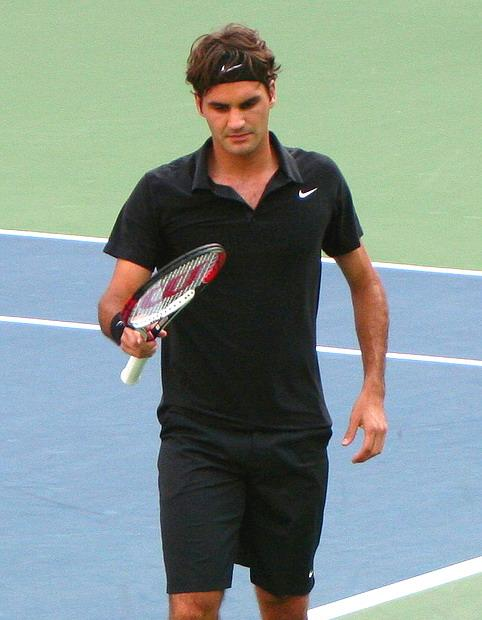
Number 1 seeded Roger Federer won the US Open for the fourth year in a row.

Quarterfinals
1 | (Switzerland) Roger Federer | 7^{7} | 7^{7} | 6
5 | (United States) Andy Roddick | 6^{5} | 6^{4} | 2
4 | (Russia) Nikolay Davydenko | 6 | 6 | 6
10 | (Germany) Tommy Haas | 3 | 3 | 4
17 | (Spain) Carlos Moyà | 4 | 6^{7} | 1
3 | (Serbia) Novak Djokovic | 6 | 7^{9} | 6
20 | (Argentina) Juan Ignacio Chela | 2 | 3 | 5
15 | (Spain) David Ferrer | 6 | 6 | 7

Semifinals
1 | (Switzerland) Roger Federer | 7 | 6 | 7
4 | (Russia) Nikolay Davydenko | 5 | 1 | 5
3 | (Serbia) Novak Djokovic | 6 | 6 | 6
15 | (Spain) David Ferrer | 4 | 4 | 3

Final
1 | (Switzerland) Roger Federer | 7^{7} | 7^{7} | 6
3 | (Serbia) Novak Djokovic | 6^{4} | 6^{2} | 4

=== Top half ===
==== Section 1 ====
First round
1 | (Switzerland) R Federer | 6 | 6 | 6
Q | (United States) S Jenkins | 3 | 2 | 4
Q | (Germany) R Schüttler | 7 | 3 | 7^{7} | 4 | 3
Q | (Chile) P Capdeville | 5 | 6 | 6^{4} | 6 | 6
Q | (France) T Ascione | 2 | 0 | r
Q | (South Africa) R de Voest | 6 | 3
WC | (United States) J Isner | 6^{4} | 7^{7} | 7^{7} | 6
26 | (Finland) J Nieminen | 7^{7} | 6^{4} | 6^{5} | 4
21 | (Spain) JC Ferrero | 3 | 4 | 4
(Spain) F López | 6 | 6 | 6
(United States) R Kendrick | 6^{4} | 3 | 4
(Russia) I Andreev | 7^{7} | 6 | 6
WC | (United States) D Young | 6^{2} | 6 | 6 | 6
(Australia) C Guccione | 7^{7} | 3 | 2 | 3
(Argentina) S Roitman | 5 | 1 | 2
13 | (France) R Gasquet | 7 | 6 | 6

Second round
1 | (Switzerland) R Federer | 6 | 6 | 6
Q | (Chile) P Capdeville | 1 | 4 | 4
Q | (South Africa) R de Voest | 3 | 3 | 6^{4}
WC | (United States) J Isner | 6 | 6 | 7^{7}
(Spain) F López | 6^{3} | 7 | 3 | 6 | 7^{7}
(Russia) I Andreev | 7^{7} | 5 | 6 | 4 | 6^{5}
WC | (United States) D Young | w/o
13 | (France) R Gasquet

Third round
1 | (Switzerland) R Federer | 6^{4} | 6 | 6 | 6
WC | (United States) J Isner | 7^{7} | 2 | 4 | 2
(Spain) F López | 3 | 6 | 7^{7} | 7
WC | (United States) D Young | 6 | 3 | 6^{5} | 5

Fourth round
1 | (Switzerland) R Federer | 3 | 6 | 6 | 6
(Spain) F López | 6 | 4 | 1 | 4

==== Section 2 ====
First round
9 | (Czech Republic) T Berdych | 6 | 7^{7} | 6
(France) M Gicquel | 3 | 6^{0} | 2
(Italy) S Bolelli | 6 | 6 | 3 | 6
(France) J Benneteau | 3 | 4 | 6 | 1
(France) G Simon | 6 | 6
Q | (Germany) A Waske | 4 | 1 | r
(Spain) F Verdasco | 3 | 1 | 6 | 6 | 6
22 | (France) P-H Mathieu | 6 | 6 | 4 | 3 | 3
32 | (Croatia) I Karlović | 6^{5} | 4 | 6 | 7^{8} | 4
(France) A Clément | 7^{7} | 6 | 4 | 6^{6} | 6
(Sweden) T Johansson | 2 | 7^{7} | 6 | 6
(Chile) N Massú | 6 | 6^{3} | 3 | 3
(Argentina) J Acasuso | 6 | 6^{2} | 6 | 6
(Argentina) M Vassallo | 4 | 7^{7} | 3 | 4
PR | (United States) J Gimelstob | 6^{6} | 3 | 3
5 | (United States) A Roddick | 7^{8} | 6 | 6

Second round
9 | (Czech Republic) T Berdych | 7 | 6 | 6
(Italy) S Bolelli | 5 | 3 | 3
(France) G Simon | 0 | 4 | 3
(Spain) F Verdasco | 6 | 6 | 6
(France) A Clément | 4 | 6^{4} | 7^{11} | 6^{1}
(Sweden) T Johansson | 6 | 7^{7} | 6^{9} | 7^{7}
(Argentina) J Acasuso | 6 | 1 | 2 | r
5 | (United States) A Roddick | 4 | 6 | 6

Third round
9 | (Czech Republic) T Berdych | 7^{7} | 6 | 7^{7}
(Spain) F Verdasco | 6^{2} | 1 | 6^{3}
(Sweden) T Johansson | 3 | 2 | 0
5 | (United States) A Roddick | 6 | 6 | 6

Fourth round
9 | (Czech Republic) T Berdych | 6^{6} | 0 | r
5 | (United States) A Roddick | 7^{8} | 2

==== Section 3 ====
First round
4 | (Russia) N Davydenko | 6 | 6 | 6
WC | (United States) J Levine | 4 | 0 | 1
PR | (Germany) N Kiefer | 6 | 7^{7} | 6
(United States) V Spadea | 2 | 6^{1} | 3
(Australia) P Luczak | 6^{4} | 3 | 6^{6}
(Peru) L Horna | 7^{7} | 6 | 7^{8}
WC | (United States) A Kuznetsov | 4 | 0 | 6^{4}
28 | (Spain) N Almagro | 6 | 6 | 7^{7}
19 | (United Kingdom) A Murray | 6 | 6 | 6
Q | (Uruguay) P Cuevas | 2 | 3 | 0
(Argentina) JP Guzmán | 3 | 6^{4} | 2
(Sweden) J Björkman | 6 | 7^{7} | 6
(Slovakia) D Hrbatý | 7^{7} | 4 | 5 | 7^{8} | 4
(South Korea) H-t Lee | 6^{4} | 6 | 7 | 6^{6} | 6
(Spain) R Ramírez Hidalgo | 3 | 6 | 5 | 3
14 | (Argentina) G Cañas | 6 | 4 | 7 | 6

Second round
4 | (Russia) N Davydenko | 6 | 6 | 6
PR | (Germany) N Kiefer | 2 | 2 | 2
(Peru) L Horna | 4 | 2 | 1^{r}
28 | (Spain) N Almagro | 6 | 6 | 2
19 | (United Kingdom) A Murray | 5 | 6 | 6 | 4 | 6
(Sweden) J Björkman | 7 | 3 | 1 | 6 | 1
(South Korea) H-t Lee | 7 | 7 | 6
14 | (Argentina) G Cañas | 5 | 5 | 3

Third round
4 | (Russia) N Davydenko | 7 | 6 | 7
28 | (Spain) N Almagro | 5 | 0 | 5
19 | (United Kingdom) A Murray | 3 | 3 | 6 | 5
(South Korea) H-t Lee | 6 | 6 | 2 | 7

Fourth round
4 | (Russia) N Davydenko | 6 | 6 | 6
(South Korea) H-t Lee | 1 | 3 | 4

==== Section 4 ====
First round
10 | (Germany) T Haas | 6^{5} | 7 | 6 | 6
Q | (Belgium) S Darcis | 7^{7} | 5 | 3 | 4
(Germany) B Becker | 6 | 6 | 4 | 4 | 1
Q | (Germany) P Petzschner | 2 | 3 | 6 | 6 | 6
(United States) P Goldstein | 1 | 1^{r}
(France) S Grosjean | 6 | 4
(Belarus) M Mirnyi | 6 | 7 | 3 | 7^{8}
18 | (Cyprus) M Baghdatis | 3 | 5 | 6 | 6^{6}
29 | (Italy) F Volandri | 3 | 6 | 4 | 4
(France) M Llodra | 6 | 4 | 6 | 6
(Austria) S Koubek | 7^{7} | 6 | 6
(United States) S Querrey | 6^{1} | 1 | 1
(France) F Santoro | 6 | 6^{8} | 6 | 6
(Spain) A Montañés | 1 | 7^{10} | 2 | 1
(United States) M Russell | 6^{6} | 3 | 6^{4}
6 | (United States) J Blake | 7^{8} | 6 | 7^{7}

Second round
10 | (Germany) T Haas | 4 | 6 | 6 | 7
Q | (Germany) P Petzschner | 6 | 3 | 2 | 5
(France) S Grosjean | 6 | 6^{6} | 6 | 6
(Belarus) M Mirnyi | 4 | 7^{8} | 4 | 3
(France) M Llodra | 1 | 3 | 3
(Austria) S Koubek | 6 | 6 | 6
(France) F Santoro | 4 | 6 | 2 | 6 | 4
6 | (United States) J Blake | 6 | 3 | 6 | 4 | 6

Third round
10 | (Germany) T Haas | 6 | 6 | 3 | 4 | 6
(France) S Grosjean | 2 | 4 | 6 | 6 | 3
(Austria) S Koubek | 4 | 6 | 6^{5} | 1
6 | (United States) J Blake | 6 | 3 | 7^{7} | 6

Fourth round
10 | (Germany) T Haas | 4 | 6 | 3 | 6 | 7^{7}
6 | (United States) J Blake | 6 | 4 | 6 | 0 | 6^{4}

=== Bottom half ===
==== Section 5 ====
First round
8 | (Spain) T Robredo | 6 | 7^{7} | 6
LL | (United States) B Reynolds | 3 | 6^{5} | 1
(United States) M Fish | 6 | 6 | 6
Q | (Mexico) B Echagaray | 4 | 1 | 2
Q | (Poland) M Przysiężny | 1 | 6 | 1 | 6^{4}
(Germany) M Berrer | 6 | 4 | 6 | 7^{7}
(Latvia) E Gulbis | 7 | 7^{7} | 6
30 | (Italy) P Starace | 5 | 6^{4} | 3
17 | (Spain) C Moyá | 6 | 6 | 6
Q | (Germany) B Phau | 1 | 2 | 4
(Spain) G García-López | 6 | 3 | 5 | 6 | 5
(Russia) I Kunitsyn | 4 | 6 | 7 | 2 | 7
(Argentina) M Zabaleta | 2 | 2 | 4
(Germany) P Kohlschreiber | 6 | 6 | 6
(France) N Devilder | 0 | 1 | 2
11 | (Russia) M Youzhny | 6 | 6 | 6

Second round
8 | (Spain) T Robredo | 6 | 3 | 6 | 6^{7} | 6
(United States) M Fish | 4 | 6 | 4 | 7^{9} | 4
(Germany) M Berrer | 6^{4} | 2 | 1
(Latvia) E Gulbis | 7^{7} | 6 | 6
17 | (Spain) C Moyá | 6 | 6 | 7
(Russia) I Kunitsyn | 4 | 4 | 5
(Germany) P Kohlschreiber | 3 | 6 | 6 | 6
11 | (Russia) M Youzhny | 6 | 4 | 3 | 3

Third round
8 | (Spain) T Robredo | 1 | 3 | 2
(Latvia) E Gulbis | 6 | 6 | 6
17 | (Spain) C Moyá | 4 | 7 | 7^{7} | 4 | 6
(Germany) P Kohlschreiber | 6 | 5 | 6^{5} | 6 | 4

Fourth round
(Latvia) E Gulbis | 5 | 2 | 7^{7} | 4
17 | (Spain) C Moyá | 7 | 6 | 6^{5} | 6

==== Section 6 ====
First round
16 | (Australia) L Hewitt | 6 | 6 | 6
(United States) A Delić | 2 | 4 | 2
(Italy) A Seppi | 4 | 4 | 6 | 5
(Argentina) A Calleri | 6 | 6 | 3 | 7
Q | (Israel) D Sela | 5 | 6 | 6 | 6
(Ecuador) N Lapentti | 7 | 2 | 1 | 3
(France) É Roger-Vasselin | 2 | 6 | 1 | 5
23 | (Argentina) J Mónaco | 6 | 3 | 6 | 7
31 | (Austria) J Melzer | 6 | 7 | 7
(Argentina) D Hartfield | 4 | 5 | 5
(Argentina) JM del Potro | 6 | 6 | 6
(France) N Mahut | 0 | 4 | 2
(Argentina) C Berlocq | 6^{3} | 7^{7} | 4 | 2
(Czech Republic) R Štěpánek | 7^{7} | 6^{4} | 6 | 6
LL | (Netherlands) R Haase | 2 | 1 | 3
3 | (Serbia) N Djokovic | 6 | 6 | 6

Second round
16 | (Australia) L Hewitt | 6 | 4 | 4 | 2
(Argentina) A Calleri | 4 | 6 | 6 | 6
Q | (Israel) D Sela | 4 | 0 | 7^{7} | 4
23 | (Argentina) J Mónaco | 6 | 6 | 6^{1} | 6
31 | (Austria) J Melzer | 3 | 1 | 4
(Argentina) JM del Potro | 6 | 6 | 6
(Czech Republic) R Štěpánek | 7^{7} | 6^{5} | 7 | 5 | 6^{2}
3 | (Serbia) N Djokovic | 6^{4} | 7^{7} | 5 | 7 | 7^{7}

Third round
(Argentina) A Calleri | 6^{5} | 2 | 4
23 | (Argentina) J Mónaco | 7^{7} | 6 | 6
(Argentina) JM del Potro | 1 | 3 | 4
3 | (Serbia) N Djokovic | 6 | 6 | 6

Fourth round
23 | (Argentina) J Mónaco | 5 | 6^{2} | 7^{8} | 1
3 | (Serbia) N Djokovic | 7 | 7^{7} | 6^{6} | 6

==== Section 7 ====
First round
7 | (Chile) F González | 4 | 1 | 6 | 7 | 4
(Russia) T Gabashvili | 6 | 6 | 3 | 5 | 6
(United States) R Ginepri | 6 | 6 | 6
(Belgium) O Rochus | 0 | 3 | 1
(Switzerland) S Wawrinka | 4 | 6 | 4 | 6 | 7
(Russia) E Korolev | 6 | 3 | 6 | 4 | 5
Q | (Canada) F Dancevic | 5 | 6^{5} | 6^{7}
25 | (Russia) M Safin | 7 | 7^{7} | 7^{9}
20 | (Argentina) JI Chela | 6 | 6 | 7^{7}
WC | (United States) M McClune | 2 | 1 | 6^{0}
(Thailand) D Udomchoke | 7^{7} | 3 | 1 | 6 | 6^{2}
WC | (United States) W Odesnik | 6^{2} | 6 | 6 | 3 | 7^{7}
Q | (Romania) A Pavel | 3 | 6 | 6 | 7
Q | (Germany) D Meffert | 6 | 3 | 2 | 5
(Belgium) K Vliegen | 1 | 6^{1} | 1
12 | (Croatia) I Ljubičić | 6 | 7^{7} | 6

Second round
(Russia) T Gabashvili | 2 | 3 | 1
(United States) R Ginepri | 6 | 6 | 6
(Switzerland) S Wawrinka | 6 | 6 | 6
25 | (Russia) M Safin | 3 | 3 | 3
20 | (Argentina) JI Chela | 6 | 6 | 7
WC | (United States) W Odesnik | 3 | 1 | 5
Q | (Romania) A Pavel | 3 | 4 | 6^{6}
12 | (Croatia) I Ljubičić | 6 | 6 | 7^{8}

Third round
(United States) R Ginepri | 7 | 4 | 6 | 4 | 3
(Switzerland) S Wawrinka | 5 | 6 | 4 | 6 | 6
20 | (Argentina) JI Chela | 6 | 6^{5} | 2 | 6 | 6
12 | (Croatia) I Ljubičić | 4 | 7^{7} | 6 | 3 | 3

Fourth round
(Switzerland) S Wawrinka | 6 | 2 | 6^{6} | 6 | 4
20 | (Argentina) JI Chela | 4 | 6 | 7^{8} | 1 | 6

==== Section 8 ====
First round
15 | (Spain) D Ferrer | 6 | 6 | 6
(Germany) F Mayer | 3 | 2 | 3
(France) F Serra | 6^{3} | 7^{7} | 6 | 6
(Austria) W Eschauer | 7^{7} | 6^{2} | 4 | 2
(Belgium) X Malisse | 6 | 6^{5} | 6 | 7
(Denmark) K Pless | 4 | 7^{7} | 3 | 5
(Spain) I Navarro | 5 | 6^{4} | 6^{6}
24 | (Argentina) D Nalbandian | 7 | 7^{7} | 7^{8}
27 | (Russia) D Tursunov | 4 | 6 | 3 | 4
(United Kingdom) T Henman | 6 | 3 | 6 | 6
(France) J-W Tsonga | 7 | 6 | 6
(Spain) Ó Hernández | 5 | 1 | 3
(Serbia) J Tipsarević | 5 | 6 | 6 | 6
WC | (United States) R Sweeting | 7 | 2 | 4 | 2
WC | (Australia) A Jones | 5 | 6 | 4 | 1
2 | (Spain) R Nadal | 7 | 3 | 6 | 6

Second round
15 | (Spain) D Ferrer | 4 | 6 | 6 | 6
(France) F Serra | 6 | 3 | 3 | 2
(Belgium) X Malisse | 4 | 4 | 2
24 | (Argentina) D Nalbandian | 6 | 6 | 6
(United Kingdom) T Henman | 6^{2} | 6 | 5 | 4
(France) J-W Tsonga | 7^{7} | 2 | 7 | 6
(Serbia) J Tipsarević | 2 | 3 | 2 | r
2 | (Spain) R Nadal | 6 | 6 | 3

Third round
15 | (Spain) D Ferrer | 6 | 3 | 4 | 7^{7} | 7
24 | (Argentina) D Nalbandian | 3 | 6 | 6 | 6^{5} | 5
(France) J-W Tsonga | 6^{3} | 2 | 1
2 | (Spain) R Nadal | 7^{7} | 6 | 6

Fourth round
15 | (Spain) D Ferrer | 6^{3} | 6 | 7^{7} | 6
2 | (Spain) R Nadal | 7^{7} | 4 | 6^{4} | 2

| Preceded by 2007 Wimbledon Championships – Men's singles | Grand Slam men's singles | Succeeded by 2008 Australian Open – Men's singles |
