= 2007 US Open – Mixed doubles =

Mixed doubles
- 2007 US Open

Final
- Champion: (Belarus) Victoria Azarenka (Belarus) Max Mirnyi
- Runner-up: (United States) Meghann Shaughnessy (India) Leander Paes
- Score: 6–4, 7–6^{(8–6)}

Details
- Draw: 32
- Seeds: 8

Events
Singles	men	women		boys	girls
Doubles	men	women	mixed	boys	girls
WC Singles	men	women	quad
WC Doubles	men	women	quad
Legends	men	women	mixed
- US Open

Martina Navratilova and Bob Bryan were the defending champions, but Navratilova retired from the sport at the end of 2006. Bryan partnered Tatiana Golovin, and lost in the second round to Sania Mirza and Mahesh Bhupathi.

Victoria Azarenka and Max Mirnyi won the title, defeating Meghann Shaughnessy and Leander Paes in the final 6–4, 7–6^{(8–6)}. This was Azarenka's first Grand Slam title; she would later win two Grand Slam singles titles and reach No. 1 in the world.

== Seeds ==
1. (United States) Lisa Raymond / (Serbia) Nenad Zimonjić (first round)
2. (Australia) Alicia Molik / (United States) Mike Bryan (second round)
3. (China) Yan Zi / (The Bahamas) Mark Knowles (semifinals)
4. (Italy) Mara Santangelo / (Australia) Paul Hanley (first round)
5. (Czech Republic) Květa Peschke / (Czech Republic) Martin Damm (second round)
6. (Zimbabwe) Cara Black / (Poland) Marcin Matkowski (first round)
7. (Russia) Elena Likhovtseva / (Canada) Daniel Nestor (first round)
8. (Chinese Taipei) Chuang Chia-jung / (Israel) Jonathan Erlich (second round)

== Draw ==
Key

- Q = Qualifier
- WC = Wild card
- LL = Lucky loser
- Alt = Alternate
- ITF = ITF entry
- PR = Protected ranking
- SR = Special ranking
- SE = Special exempt
- JE = Junior exempt
- JR = Junior Accelerator Programme entrant
- CO = College Accelerator Programme entrant
- NG = Next Gen Accelerator Program entrant
- w/o = Walkover
- r = Retired
- d = Defaulted

=== Finals ===
Quarterfinals
(Belarus) Victoria Azarenka (Belarus) Max Mirnyi	6	6
(India) Sania Mirza (India) Mahesh Bhupathi	4	1
3	(China) Yan Zi (The Bahamas) Mark Knowles	6	6
(France) Nathalie Dechy (Israel) Andy Ram	4	4
(Poland) Agnieszka Radwańska (Poland) Mariusz Fyrstenberg	1	2
(United States) Liezel Huber (United Kingdom) Jamie Murray	6	6
(United States) Meghann Shaughnessy (India) Leander Paes	6	6
WC	(United States) Ashley Harkleroad (United States) Justin Gimelstob	3	4

Semifinals
(Belarus) Victoria Azarenka (Belarus) Max Mirnyi	7^{7}	6
3	(China) Yan Zi (The Bahamas) Mark Knowles	6^{5}	4
(United States) Liezel Huber (United Kingdom) Jamie Murray	7^{7}	6^{5}	5
(United States) Meghann Shaughnessy (India) Leander Paes	6^{4}	7^{7}	10

Finals
(Belarus) Victoria Azarenka (Belarus) Max Mirnyi	6	7^{8}
(United States) Meghann Shaughnessy (India) Leander Paes	4	6^{6}

=== Top half ===
First round
1	(United States) L Raymond (Serbia) N Zimonjić	7^{8}	3	3
(Belarus) V Azarenka (Belarus) M Mirnyi	6^{6}	6	10
WC	(United States) A Glatch (United States) S Jenkins	2	1
WC	(United States) V King (United States) V Spadea	6	6
(France) T Golovin (United States) B Bryan	7	6
WC	(United States) C Morariu (United States) A Delić	6^{2}	4
(India) S Mirza (India) M Bhupathi	6	6
7	(Russia) E Likhovtseva (Canada) D Nestor	0	2
3	(China) Z Yan (The Bahamas) M Knowles	6	6
(Spain) V Ruano Pascual (Argentina) S Prieto	2	2
WC	(United States) A Weinhold (United States) R Sweeting	6	3	8
(Czech Republic) V Uhlířová (Sweden) S Aspelin	4	6	10
(Russia) M Kirilenko (Russia) I Andreev	1	0
(France) N Dechy (Israel) A Ram	6	6
(Austria) S Bammer (Czech Republic) F Čermák	4	3
8	(Chinese Taipei) CJ Chuang (Israel) J Erlich	6	6

Second round
(Belarus) V Azarenka (Belarus) M Mirnyi	4	7	10
WC	(United States) V King (United States) V Spadea	6	5	7
(France) T Golovin (United States) B Bryan	6^{4}	6	2
(India) S Mirza (India) M Bhupathi	7^{7}	3	10
3	(China) Z Yan (The Bahamas) M Knowles	6^{4}	6	10
(Czech Republic) V Uhlířová (Sweden) S Aspelin	7^{7}	1	5
(France) N Dechy (Israel) A Ram	6	6
8	(Chinese Taipei) CJ Chuang (Israel) J Erlich	2	3

Quarterfinals
(Belarus) V Azarenka (Belarus) M Mirnyi	6	6
(India) S Mirza (India) M Bhupathi	4	1
3	(China) Z Yan (The Bahamas) M Knowles	6	6
(France) N Dechy (Israel) A Ram	4	4

Semifinals
(Belarus) V Azarenka (Belarus) M Mirnyi	7^{7}	6
3	(China) Z Yan (The Bahamas) M Knowles	6^{5}	4

=== Bottom half ===
First round
6	(Zimbabwe) C Black (Poland) M Matkowski	4	4
(Poland) A Radwańska (Poland) M Fyrstenberg	6	6
(Australia) R Stubbs (Australia) T Perry	2	r
(Chinese Taipei) Chan YJ (Netherlands) R Wassen	5
(Argentina) P Suárez (Zimbabwe) K Ullyett	6	6
WC	(United States) J Craybas (United States) B Reynolds	3	4
(United States) L Huber (United Kingdom) J Murray	7^{7}	7^{7}
4	(Italy) M Santangelo (Australia) P Hanley	6^{3}	6^{5}
5	(Czech Republic) K Peschke (Czech Republic) M Damm	6	6
(China) Sun TT (Austria) J Knowle	4	4
(United States) M Shaughnessy (India) L Paes	7	6
(Slovakia) J Husárová (Czech Republic) P Vízner	5	3
WC	(United States) A Harkleroad (United States) J Gimelstob	7	6
(Germany) M Müller (Australia) A Fisher	5	4
(United States) M Tu (France) F Santoro	3	6^{2}
2	(Australia) A Molik (United States) M Bryan	6	7^{7}

Second round
(Poland) A Radwańska (Poland) M Fyrstenberg	6	7^{7}
(Chinese Taipei) Chan YJ (Netherlands) R Wassen	4	6^{2}
(Argentina) P Suárez (Zimbabwe) K Ullyett	5	4
(United States) L Huber (United Kingdom) J Murray	7	6
5	(Czech Republic) K Peschke (Czech Republic) M Damm	5	3
(United States) M Shaughnessy (India) L Paes	7	6
WC	(United States) A Harkleroad (United States) J Gimelstob	6	6
2	(Australia) A Molik (United States) M Bryan	3	4

Quarterfinals
(Poland) A Radwańska (Poland) M Fyrstenberg	1	2
(United States) L Huber (United Kingdom) J Murray	6	6
(United States) M Shaughnessy (India) L Paes	6	6
WC	(United States) A Harkleroad (United States) J Gimelstob	3	4

Semifinals
(United States) L Huber (United Kingdom) J Murray	7^{7}	6^{5}	5
(United States) M Shaughnessy (India) L Paes	6^{4}	7^{7}	10
