= 2007 US Open – Women's doubles =

Women's doubles
- 2007 US Open

Final
- Champion: (France) Nathalie Dechy (Russia) Dinara Safina
- Runner-up: (Chinese Taipei) Chan Yung-jan (Chinese Taipei) Chuang Chia-jung
- Score: 6–4, 6–2

Details
- Draw: 64 (7 WC )
- Seeds: 16

Events
Singles	men	women		boys	girls
Doubles	men	women	mixed	boys	girls
WC Singles	men	women	quad
WC Doubles	men	women	quad
Legends	men	women	mixed
← 2006 ·	US Open	· 2008 →

The 2007 US Open women's doubles tennis tournament was held from 27 August to 9 September 2007, at USTA Billie Jean King National Tennis Center at Flushing Meadows, New York City. The event was won by first-time pairing Nathalie Dechy and Dinara Safina.

== Seeds ==
1. (Zimbabwe) Cara Black / (United States) Liezel Huber (second round)
2. (United States) Lisa Raymond / (Australia) Samantha Stosur (third round)
3. (Slovenia) Katarina Srebotnik / (Japan) Ai Sugiyama (quarterfinals)
4. (Australia) Alicia Molik / (Italy) Mara Santangelo (third round)
5. (Chinese Taipei) Chan Yung-jan / (Chinese Taipei) Chuang Chia-jung (finals)
6. (Czech Republic) Květa Peschke / (Australia) Rennae Stubbs (semifinals)
7. (France) Nathalie Dechy / (Russia) Dinara Safina (champions)
8. (Russia) Elena Likhovtseva / (China) Sun Tiantian (first round)
9. (Spain) Anabel Medina Garrigues / (Spain) Virginia Ruano Pascual (third round)
10. (China) Peng Shuai / (China) Yan Zi (second round)
11. (Russia) Maria Kirilenko / (Russia) Elena Vesnina (first round)
12. (Italy) Tathiana Garbin / (Israel) Shahar Pe'er (third round)
13. (United States) Corina Morariu / (United States) Meghann Shaughnessy (quarterfinals)
14. (Hungary) Ágnes Szávay / (Czech Republic) Vladimíra Uhlířová (semifinals)
15. (United States) Vania King / (France) Émilie Loit (third round)
16. (United States) Bethanie Mattek / (India) Sania Mirza (quarterfinals)

== Draw ==
=== Key ===
- Q = Qualifier
- WC = Wild card
- LL = Lucky loser
- Alt = Alternate
- ITF = ITF entry
- PR = Protected ranking
- SR = Special ranking
- SE = Special exempt
- JE = Junior exempt
- JR = Junior Accelerator Programme entrant
- CO = College Accelerator Programme entrant
- NG = Next Gen Accelerator Program entrant
- w/o = Walkover
- r = Retired
- d = Defaulted

=== Finals ===
Quarter-Finals
13	(United States) Corina Morariu (United States) Meghann Shaughnessy	2	2
6	(Czech Republic) Květa Peschke (Australia) Rennae Stubbs	6	6
3	(Slovenia) Katarina Srebotnik (Japan) Ai Sugiyama	5	3
7	(France) Nathalie Dechy (Russia) Dinara Safina	7	6
(France) Stéphanie Foretz (Russia) Yaroslava Shvedova	6	3	3
14	(Hungary) Ágnes Szávay (Czech Republic) Vladimíra Uhlířová	3	6	6
5	(Chinese Taipei) Chan Yung-jan (Chinese Taipei) Chuang Chia-jung	6	3	6
16	(United States) Bethanie Mattek (India) Sania Mirza	3	6	4

Semi-Finals
6	(Czech Republic) Květa Peschke (Australia) Rennae Stubbs	4	4
7	(France) Nathalie Dechy (Russia) Dinara Safina	6	6
14	(Hungary) Ágnes Szávay (Czech Republic) Vladimíra Uhlířová	2	6^{5}
5	(Chinese Taipei) Chan Yung-jan (Chinese Taipei) Chuang Chia-jung	6	7^{7}

Final
7	(France) Nathalie Dechy (Russia) Dinara Safina	6	6
5	(Chinese Taipei) Chan Yung-jan (Chinese Taipei) Chuang Chia-jung	4	2

=== Top half ===
==== Section 1 ====
First round
1	(Zimbabwe) C Black (United States) L Huber	6	6
(United States) J Craybas (United States) L Granville	3	4
WC	(United States) A Glatch (United States) A Spears	4	5
(Italy) ME Camerin (Argentina) G Dulko	6	7
(Poland) K Jans (Poland) A Rosolska	6	6
WC	(United States) S Anundsen (United States) J Long	2	1
(Germany) M Müller (Czech Republic) G Navrátilová	2	7	1
13	(United States) C Morariu (United States) M Shaughnessy	6	5	6
10	(China) S Peng (China) Z Yan	4	6	6
(Romania) E Gallovits (United States) L Osterloh	6	1	4
(Austria) S Bammer (Austria) T Paszek	3	2
(Slovakia) D Hantuchová (Switzerland) M Hingis	6	6
(Japan) R Fujiwara (Japan) A Nakamura	6	6^{6}	7
(France) S Cohen-Aloro (France) V Razzano	4	7^{8}	5
(Belarus) O Govortsova (Russia) O Puchkova	4	2
6	(Czech Republic) K Peschke (Australia) R Stubbs	6	6

Second round
1	(Zimbabwe) C Black (United States) L Huber	6	6^{2}	2
(Italy) ME Camerin (Argentina) G Dulko	1	7^{7}	6
(Poland) K Jans (Poland) A Rosolska	2	3
13	(United States) C Morariu (United States) M Shaughnessy	6	6
10	(China) S Peng (China) Z Yan	0	6	4
(Slovakia) D Hantuchová (Switzerland) M Hingis	6	3	6
(Japan) R Fujiwara (Japan) A Nakamura	6^{3}	2
6	(Czech Republic) K Peschke (Australia) R Stubbs	7^{7}	6

Third round
(Italy) ME Camerin (Argentina) G Dulko	1	2
13	(United States) C Morariu (United States) M Shaughnessy	6	6
(Slovakia) D Hantuchová (Switzerland) M Hingis	6	3	4
6	(Czech Republic) K Peschke (Australia) R Stubbs	4	6	6

Quarterfinals
13	(United States) C Morariu (United States) M Shaughnessy	2	2
6	(Czech Republic) K Peschke (Australia) R Stubbs	6	6

==== Section 2 ====
First round
3	(Slovenia) K Srebotnik (Japan) A Sugiyama	6	6
(China) CM Ji (China) SN Sun	0	1
(Netherlands) M Krajicek (Poland) A Radwańska	7^{7}	7
(Czech Republic) L Hradecká (Czech Republic) R Voráčová	6^{3}	5
(Australia) C Dellacqua (Australia) N Pratt	6	6
WC	(United States) H Barte (United States) A Mueller	1	2
WC	(United States) A Haynes (United States) A Rolle	4	1
15	(United States) V King (France) É Loit	6	6
12	(Italy) T Garbin (Israel) S Pe'er	6	6
(South Africa) N Grandin (Czech Republic) K Zakopalová	1	2
(Chinese Taipei) S-w Hsieh (Russia) A Kudryavtseva	6	6^{2}	5
(Belarus) T Poutchek (Thailand) T Tanasugarn	3	7^{7}	7
(Ukraine) M Koryttseva (France) A Rezaï	3	4
(Slovakia) J Husárová (Switzerland) P Schnyder	6	6
(Italy) F Schiavone (Italy) K Knapp	4	1
7	(France) N Dechy (Russia) D Safina	6	6

Second round
3	(Slovenia) K Srebotnik (Japan) A Sugiyama	5	6	6
(Netherlands) M Krajicek (Poland) A Radwańska	7	0	2
(Australia) C Dellacqua (Australia) N Pratt	6	3	3
15	(United States) V King (France) É Loit	3	6	6
12	(Italy) T Garbin (Israel) S Pe'er	6	6
(Belarus) T Poutchek (Thailand) T Tanasugarn	1	2
(Slovakia) J Husárová (Switzerland) P Schnyder	3	5
7	(France) N Dechy (Russia) D Safina	6	7

Third round
3	(Slovenia) K Srebotnik (Japan) A Sugiyama	6	6
15	(United States) V King (France) É Loit	3	2
12	(Italy) T Garbin (Israel) S Pe'er	4	6	5
7	(France) N Dechy (Russia) D Safina	6	1	7

Quarterfinals
3	(Slovenia) K Srebotnik (Japan) A Sugiyama	5	3
7	(France) N Dechy (Russia) D Safina	7	6

=== Bottom half ===
==== Section 3 ====
First round
8	(Russia) E Likhovtseva (China) TT Sun	6^{6}	6^{4}
(United States) A Harkleroad (Russia) V Zvonareva	7^{8}	7^{7}
(France) S Foretz (Russia) Y Shvedova	6	6
WC	(United States) M Brengle (United States) A Weinhold	0	3
(Czech Republic) I Benešová (Russia) G Voskoboeva	7^{8}	6
(Slovakia) D Cibulková (France) C Pin	6^{6}	1
(Japan) A Morigami (United States) M Tu	6	6
11	(Russia) M Kirilenko (Russia) E Vesnina	4	1
14	(Hungary) Á Szávay (Czech Republic) V Uhlířová	6	6
WC	(United States) J Jackson (United States) C Rubin	2	4
(Czech Republic) P Cetkovská (Czech Republic) L Šafářová	2	7	4
(Greece) E Daniilidou (Germany) J Wöhr	6	5	6
(Argentina) P Suárez (Italy) R Vinci	2	7^{7}	6^{8}
(Spain) M Marrero (Tunisia) S Sfar	6	6^{5}	7^{10}
(Spain) L Domínguez Lino (Spain) A Parra Santonja	3	4
4	(Australia) A Molik (Italy) M Santangelo	6	6

Second round
(United States) A Harkleroad (Russia) V Zvonareva
(France) S Foretz (Russia) Y Shvedova	w/o
(Czech Republic) I Benešová (Russia) G Voskoboeva	6^{6}	3
(Japan) A Morigami (United States) M Tu	7^{8}	6
14	(Hungary) Á Szávay (Czech Republic) V Uhlířová	7	7
(Greece) E Daniilidou (Germany) J Wöhr	5	5
(Spain) M Marrero (Tunisia) S Sfar	3	1
4	(Australia) A Molik (Italy) M Santangelo	6	6

Third round
(France) S Foretz (Russia) Y Shvedova	6	6
(Japan) A Morigami (United States) M Tu	2	1
14	(Hungary) Á Szávay (Czech Republic) V Uhlířová	7	6
4	(Australia) A Molik (Italy) M Santangelo	5	4

Quarterfinals
(France) S Foretz (Russia) Y Shvedova	6	3	3
14	(Hungary) Á Szávay (Czech Republic) V Uhlířová	3	6	6

==== Section 4 ====
First round
5	(Chinese Taipei) Y-j Chan (Chinese Taipei) C-j Chuang	6	6
WC	(United States) J Hampton (United States) M Oudin	1	1
(Ukraine) A Bondarenko (Ukraine) K Bondarenko	7	6
(Ukraine) Y Fedak (Estonia) K Kanepi	5	2
(Russia) V Dushevina (Ukraine) T Perebiynis	7	2	7
(Belarus) V Azarenka (Russia) A Chakvetadze	5	6	5
(Croatia) J Kostanić Tošić (Czech Republic) B Záhlavová-Strýcová	1	1
9	(Spain) A Medina Garrigues (Spain) V Ruano Pascual	6	6
16	(United States) B Mattek (India) S Mirza	6	6
(France) S Brémond (Serbia) J Janković	2	1
(Slovakia) J Gajdošová (Australia) B Stewart	6	6
(Germany) A Kerber (Austria) Y Meusburger	3	3
(Russia) E Dementieva (Italy) F Pennetta	6	6
(Finland) E Laine (Denmark) C Wozniacki	4	1
(Romania) A Ehritt-Vanc (Russia) A Rodionova	1	3
2	(United States) L Raymond (Australia) S Stosur	6	6

Second round
5	(Chinese Taipei) Y-j Chan (Chinese Taipei) C-j Chuang	2	6	6
(Ukraine) A Bondarenko (Ukraine) K Bondarenko	6	1	4
(Russia) V Dushevina (Ukraine) T Perebiynis	2	2
9	(Spain) A Medina Garrigues (Spain) V Ruano Pascual	6	6
16	(United States) B Mattek (India) S Mirza	6	6
(Slovakia) J Gajdošová (Australia) B Stewart	2	2
(Russia) E Dementieva (Italy) F Pennetta	1	4
2	(United States) L Raymond (Australia) S Stosur	6	6

Third round
5	(Chinese Taipei) Y-j Chan (Chinese Taipei) C-j Chuang	6	6
9	(Spain) A Medina Garrigues (Spain) V Ruano Pascual	4	2
16	(United States) B Mattek (India) S Mirza	2	7	7
2	(United States) L Raymond (Australia) S Stosur	6	5	5

Quarterfinals
5	(Chinese Taipei) Y-j Chan (Chinese Taipei) C-j Chuang	6	3	6
16	(United States) B Mattek (India) S Mirza	3	6	4

== See also ==
- List of tennis tournaments
