= 2007 US Open – Wheelchair women's singles =

Hardcourt tennis tournament

Wheelchair women's singles
- 2007 US Open

Final
- Champion: (Netherlands) Esther Vergeer
- Runner-up: (France) Florence Gravellier
- Score: 6–3, 6–1

Events
Singles	men	women		boys	girls
Doubles	men	women	mixed	boys	girls
WC Singles	men	women	quad
WC Doubles	men	women	quad
Legends	men	women	mixed
← 2006 ·	US Open	· 2009 →

Two-time defending champion Esther Vergeer defeated Florence Gravellier in the final, 6–3, 6–1 to win the women's singles wheelchair tennis title at the 2007 US Open.

== Seeds ==
1. (Netherlands) Esther Vergeer (champion)
2. (Netherlands) Sharon Walraven (semifinals)

== Draw ==
=== Key ===
- Q = Qualifier
- WC = Wild card
- LL = Lucky loser
- Alt = Alternate
- ITF = ITF entry
- PR = Protected ranking
- SR = Special ranking
- SE = Special exempt
- JE = Junior exempt
- JR = Junior Accelerator Programme entrant
- CO = College Accelerator Programme entrant
- NG = Next Gen Accelerator Program entrant
- w/o = Walkover
- r = Retired
- d = Defaulted

=== Finals ===
First round
1	(Netherlands) Esther Vergeer	6	6
(Netherlands) Korie Homan	4	2
(United States) Beth Arnoult-Ritthaler	0	2
(Netherlands) Jiske Griffioen	6	6
(France) Florence Gravellier	7	6
(South Korea) Hong Young-Suk	5	3
(Japan) Mie Yaosa	3	6	3
2	(Netherlands) Sharon Walraven	6	4	6

Second round
1	(Netherlands) Esther Vergeer	6	6
(Netherlands) Jiske Griffioen	1	2
(France) Florence Gravellier	6	6^{7}	6
2	(Netherlands) Sharon Walraven	2	7^{9}	4

Finals
1	(Netherlands) Esther Vergeer	6	6
(France) Florence Gravellier	3	1
