= 2007 US Open – Wheelchair quad singles =

Wheelchair quad singles
- 2007 US Open

Final
- Champion: (United Kingdom) Peter Norfolk
- Runner-up: (United States) David Wagner
- Score: 7–6^{(7–5)}, 6–2

Events
| Singles | men | women | | boys | girls |
| Doubles | men | women | mixed | boys | girls |
| WC Singles | men | women | quad |
| WC Doubles | men | women | quad |
| Legends | men | women | mixed |
- US Open

Peter Norfolk defeated David Wagner in the final, 7–6^{(7–5)}, 6–2 to win the inaugural quad singles wheelchair tennis title at the 2007 US Open. This was also the first time the quad singles was played at a Grand Slam event.

== Draw ==
Key

- Q = Qualifier
- WC = Wild card
- LL = Lucky loser
- Alt = Alternate
- ITF = ITF entry
- PR = Protected ranking
- SR = Special ranking
- SE = Special exempt
- JE = Junior exempt
- JR = Junior Accelerator Programme entrant
- CO = College Accelerator Programme entrant
- NG = Next Gen Accelerator Program entrant
- w/o = Walkover
- r = Retired
- d = Defaulted

=== Round robin ===
| | Country; Player | (Canada) Hunter | (United Kingdom) Norfolk | (United States) Taylor | (United States) Wagner |
| 1 | (Canada) Sarah Hunter (0-3) | | Norfolk | Taylor | Wagner |
| 2 | (United Kingdom) Peter Norfolk (3-0) | Norfolk | | Norfolk | Norfolk |
| 3 | (United States) Nick Taylor (1-2) | Taylor | Norfolk | | Wagner |
| 4 | (United States) David Wagner (2-1) | Wagner | Norfolk | Wagner | |

=== Final ===
- Peter Norfolk versus David Wagner
  - Norfolk defeated Wagner in the round robin.
