= 2007 US Open – Women's singles =

Women's singles
- 2007 US Open

Final
- Champion: (Belgium) Justine Henin
- Runner-up: (Russia) Svetlana Kuznetsova
- Score: 6–1, 6–3

Details
- Draw: 128
- Seeds: 32

Events
Singles	men	women		boys	girls
Doubles	men	women	mixed	boys	girls
WC Singles	men	women	quad
WC Doubles	men	women	quad
Legends	men	women	mixed
- US Open

Justine Henin defeated Svetlana Kuznetsova in the final, 6–1, 6–3 to win the women's singles tennis title at the 2007 US Open. It was her second US Open and seventh and last major title overall. Henin did not lose a set during the tournament. It was her last US Open appearance.

Maria Sharapova was the defending champion, but was defeated by Agnieszka Radwańska in the third round.

This tournament marked the final major singles appearance of former world No. 1 and five-time major singles champion Martina Hingis, who retired in November 2007 (she would later return to the sport in doubles starting in 2013). She was beaten in the third round by Victoria Azarenka. It was also the first US Open main draw appearance for future world No. 1s Caroline Wozniacki and also future champion Angelique Kerber; they lost in the first and second rounds to Serena Williams and Alizé Cornet, respectively.

== Seeds ==
1. (Belgium) Justine Henin (champion)
2. (Russia) Maria Sharapova (third round)
3. (Serbia) Jelena Janković (quarterfinals)
4. (Russia) Svetlana Kuznetsova (final)
5. (Serbia) Ana Ivanovic (fourth round)
6. (Russia) Anna Chakvetadze (semifinals)
7. (Russia) Nadia Petrova (third round)
8. (United States) Serena Williams (quarterfinals)
9. (Slovakia) Daniela Hantuchová (first round)
10. (France) Marion Bartoli (fourth round)
11. (Switzerland) Patty Schnyder (third round)
12. (United States) Venus Williams (semifinals)
13. (Czech Republic) Nicole Vaidišová (third round)
14. (Russia) Elena Dementieva (third round)
15. (Russia) Dinara Safina (fourth round)
16. (Switzerland) Martina Hingis (third round)
17. (France) Tatiana Golovin (first round)
18. (Israel) Shahar Pe'er (quarterfinals)
19. (Austria) Sybille Bammer (fourth round)
20. (Czech Republic) Lucie Šafářová (third round)
21. (Ukraine) Alona Bondarenko (third round)
22. (Slovenia) Katarina Srebotnik (second round)
23. (Italy) Tathiana Garbin (first round)
24. (Italy) Francesca Schiavone (second round)
25. (Italy) Mara Santangelo (first round)
26. (India) Sania Mirza (third round)
27. (Russia) Vera Zvonareva (third round)
28. (Japan) Ai Sugiyama (second round)
29. (Australia) Samantha Stosur (first round)
30. (Poland) Agnieszka Radwańska (fourth round)
31. (Spain) Anabel Medina Garrigues (third round)
32. (Netherlands) Michaëlla Krajicek (second round)

== Draw ==
Key

- Q = Qualifier
- WC = Wild card
- LL = Lucky loser
- Alt = Alternate
- ITF = ITF entry
- PR = Protected ranking
- SR = Special ranking
- SE = Special exempt
- JE = Junior exempt
- JR = Junior Accelerator Programme entrant
- CO = College Accelerator Programme entrant
- NG = Next Gen Accelerator Program entrant
- w/o = Walkover
- r = Retired
- d = Defaulted

=== Finals ===
Quarterfinals
1	(Belgium) Justine Henin	7^{7}	6
8	(United States) Serena Williams	6^{3}	1
3	(Serbia) Jelena Janković	6	1	6^{4}
12	(United States) Venus Williams	4	6	7^{7}
(Hungary) Ágnes Szávay	1	4
4	(Russia) Svetlana Kuznetsova	6	6
6	(Russia) Anna Chakvetadze	6	6
18	(Israel) Shahar Pe'er	4	1

Semifinals
1	(Belgium) Justine Henin	7^{7}	6
12	(United States) Venus Williams	6^{2}	4
4	(Russia) Svetlana Kuznetsova	3	6	6
6	(Russia) Anna Chakvetadze	6	1	1

Final
1	(Belgium) Justine Henin	6	6
4	(Russia) Svetlana Kuznetsova	1	3

=== Top half ===
==== Section 1 ====
First round
1	(Belgium) J Henin	6	6
Q	(Germany) J Görges	0	3
(Russia) O Puchkova	3	4
Q	(Bulgaria) T Pironkova	6	6
Q	(Russia) E Makarova	6	0	6
(Germany) J Schruff	1	6	2
Q	(Slovenia) A Klepač	3	1
28	(Japan) A Sugiyama	6	6
17	(France) T Golovin	4	6	2
WC	(United States) A Rolle	6	1	6
(Chinese Taipei) Y-j Chan	2	0
(Italy) K Knapp	6	6
(Spain) V Ruano Pascual	3	6^{4}
(Ukraine) K Bondarenko	6	7^{7}
(Colombia) C Castaño	2	3
15	(Russia) D Safina	6	6

Second round
1	(Belgium) J Henin	6	6
Q	(Bulgaria) T Pironkova	4	0
Q	(Russia) E Makarova	6	4	6
28	(Japan) A Sugiyama	4	6	2
WC	(United States) A Rolle	3	6	6
(Italy) K Knapp	6	4	3
(Ukraine) K Bondarenko	2	1
15	(Russia) D Safina	6	6

Third round
1	(Belgium) J Henin	6	6
Q	(Russia) E Makarova	0	2
WC	(United States) A Rolle	4	3
15	(Russia) D Safina	6	6

Fourth round
1	(Belgium) J Henin	6	6
15	(Russia) D Safina	0	2

==== Section 2 ====
First round
10	(France) M Bartoli	6	6
WC	(United States) A Glatch	1	1
(Italy) S Errani	7	6
Q	(Czech Republic) R Voráčová	5	3
(Germany) A Petkovic	6	6
WC	(United States) A Cohen	4	1
WC	(Australia) J Moore	3	2
20	(Czech Republic) L Šafářová	6	6
27	(Russia) V Zvonareva	6	6^{5}	6
Q	(Russia) A Jidkova	0	7^{7}	0
WC	(United States) L Albanese	0	2
(Russia) E Likhovtseva	6	6
(Belarus) T Poutchek	3	6^{4}
(Italy) ME Camerin	6	7^{7}
(Germany) A Kerber	3	5
8	(United States) S Williams	6	7

Second round
10	(France) M Bartoli	6	6
(Italy) S Errani	4	2
(Germany) A Petkovic	3	3
20	(Czech Republic) L Šafářová	6	6
27	(Russia) V Zvonareva	6	6
(Russia) E Likhovtseva	4	2
(Italy) ME Camerin	5	2
8	(United States) S Williams	7	6

Third round
10	(France) M Bartoli	4	6	6
20	(Czech Republic) L Šafářová	6	2	3
27	(Russia) V Zvonareva	4	6^{4}
8	(United States) S Williams	6	7^{7}

Fourth round
10	(France) M Bartoli	3	4
8	(United States) S Williams	6	6

==== Section 3 ====
First round
3	(Serbia) J Janković	6	7^{7}
(Slovakia) J Gajdošová	2	6^{2}
(Sweden) S Arvidsson	3	6	3
(Belarus) O Govortsova	6	2	6
(Israel) T Obziler	6	2	5
(Denmark) C Wozniacki	4	6	7
Q	(France) A Cornet	6	6
29	(Australia) S Stosur	3	2
19	(Austria) S Bammer	6	6
(Thailand) T Tanasugarn	4	4
(United States) V King	3	7	4
(United States) M Shaughnessy	6	5	6
(United States) J Craybas	0	6^{4}
Q	(Czech Republic) P Cetkovská	6	7^{7}
(France) S Cohen-Aloro	4	3
14	(Russia) E Dementieva	6	6

Second round
3	(Serbia) J Janković	6	6
(Belarus) O Govortsova	2	2
(Denmark) C Wozniacki	2	1
Q	(France) A Cornet	6	6
19	(Austria) S Bammer	6	6
(United States) M Shaughnessy	4	3
Q	(Czech Republic) P Cetkovská	3	2
14	(Russia) E Dementieva	6	6

Third round
3	(Serbia) J Janković	4	6	6
Q	(France) A Cornet	6	2	3
19	(Austria) S Bammer	6	6
14	(Russia) E Dementieva	1	2

Fourth round
3	(Serbia) J Janković	6	4	6
19	(Austria) S Bammer	4	6	1

==== Section 4 ====
First round
12	(United States) V Williams	6	6
Q	(Hungary) K Nagy	2	1
(Romania) R Olaru	7	1	6
(United States) A Harkleroad	5	6	4
(Greece) E Daniilidou	6	6
(Austria) Y Meusburger	2	4
(Argentina) G Dulko	4	3
21	(Ukraine) A Bondarenko	6	6
25	(Italy) M Santangelo	2	4
(Russia) V Dushevina	6	6
(Russia) E Bychkova	6	6
Q	(China) Z Yan	2	4
Q	(Argentina) J Cravero	3	5
(France) A Rezaï	6	7
(Japan) A Nakamura	1	1
5	(Serbia) A Ivanovic	6	6

Second round
12	(United States) V Williams	6	6
(Romania) R Olaru	4	2
(Greece) E Daniilidou	4	7^{7}	2
21	(Ukraine) A Bondarenko	6	6^{4}	6
(Russia) V Dushevina	6	6
(Russia) E Bychkova	4	3
(France) A Rezaï	3	1
5	(Serbia) A Ivanovic	6	6

Third round
12	(United States) V Williams	6	6
21	(Ukraine) A Bondarenko	1	2
(Russia) V Dushevina	1	3
5	(Serbia) A Ivanovic	6	6

Fourth round
12	(United States) V Williams	6	6
5	(Serbia) A Ivanovic	4	2

=== Bottom half ===
==== Section 5 ====
First round
7	(Russia) N Petrova	6	6
(Switzerland) T Bacsinszky	3	1
(Russia) An Rodionova	6	6
(Ukraine) O Savchuk	4	4
Q	(Germany) S Klösel	1	2
(Hungary) Á Szávay	6	6
(Italy) A Brianti	2	0
32	(Netherlands) M Krajicek	6	6
22	(Slovenia) K Srebotnik	6	6
(Australia) A Molik	2	2
(Russia) M Kirilenko	6	6
(Germany) M Müller	3	1
(Croatia) J Kostanić Tošić	6	6
(Russia) E Vesnina	4	2
(Ukraine) J Vakulenko	6	3	6
9	(Slovakia) D Hantuchová	4	6	1

Second round
7	(Russia) N Petrova	7	6
(Russia) An Rodionova	5	1
(Hungary) Á Szávay	7^{7}	6
32	(Netherlands) M Krajicek	6^{4}	3
22	(Slovenia) K Srebotnik	4	3
(Russia) M Kirilenko	6	6
(Croatia) J Kostanić Tošić	2	1
(Ukraine) J Vakulenko	6	6

Third round
7	(Russia) N Petrova	4	4
(Hungary) Á Szávay	6	6
(Russia) M Kirilenko	2	4
(Ukraine) J Vakulenko	6	6

Fourth round
(Hungary) Á Szávay	6	7^{7}
(Ukraine) J Vakulenko	4	6^{1}

==== Section 6 ====
First round
16	(Switzerland) M Hingis	6	6
(France) M Johansson	0	3
(Germany) T Malek	2	4
Q	(France) P Parmentier	6	6
Q	(Switzerland) E Gagliardi	1	1
(Belarus) V Azarenka	6	6
(Slovakia) D Cibulková	6	6
23	(Italy) T Garbin	4	3
31	(Spain) A Medina Garrigues	6	6
(Canada) A Wozniak	3	3
(Spain) L Domínguez Lino	3	6	6
PR	(South Korea) Y-j Cho	6	3	3
(France) C Pin	6	6
Q	(Ukraine) T Perebiynis	1	2
(Czech Republic) K Zakopalová	2	3
4	(Russia) S Kuznetsova	6	6

Second round
16	(Switzerland) M Hingis	6	7
Q	(France) P Parmentier	2	5
(Belarus) V Azarenka	6	6
(Slovakia) D Cibulková	2	2
31	(Spain) A Medina Garrigues	7	6
(Spain) L Domínguez Lino	5	2
(France) C Pin	3	6	0
4	(Russia) S Kuznetsova	6	4	6

Third round
16	(Switzerland) M Hingis	6	1	0
(Belarus) V Azarenka	3	6	6
31	(Spain) A Medina Garrigues	3	1
4	(Russia) S Kuznetsova	6	6

Fourth round
(Belarus) V Azarenka	2	3
4	(Russia) S Kuznetsova	6	6

==== Section 7 ====
First round
6	(Russia) A Chakvetadze	6	6
WC	(United States) A Weinhold	1	1
WC	(United States) J Jackson	6	4	0
(Australia) N Pratt	3	6	6
(United States) L Granville	6	6
Q	(France) O Sanchez	2	2
(Estonia) K Kanepi	2	7^{7}	1
26	(India) S Mirza	6	6^{5}	6
24	(Italy) F Schiavone	6	6
(France) N Dechy	3	1
(Germany) G Arn	4	4
(Austria) T Paszek	6	6
(France) S Brémond	6	7
(Romania) E Gallovits	1	5
(Czech Republic) I Benešová	3	0
11	(Switzerland) P Schnyder	6	6

Second round
6	(Russia) A Chakvetadze	6	6
(Australia) N Pratt	3	4
(United States) L Granville	3	5
26	(India) S Mirza	6	7
24	(Italy) F Schiavone	3	5
(Austria) T Paszek	6	7
(France) S Brémond	3	0
11	(Switzerland) P Schnyder	6	6

Third round
6	(Russia) A Chakvetadze	6	6
26	(India) S Mirza	2	3
(Austria) T Paszek	4	6	7^{7}
11	(Switzerland) P Schnyder	6	4	6^{1}

Fourth round
6	(Russia) A Chakvetadze	6	7
(Austria) T Paszek	1	5

==== Section 8 ====
First round
13	(Czech Republic) N Vaidišová	6	6
(Russia) A Kudryavtseva	1	2
(Italy) F Pennetta	1	6	6
(China) S Peng	6	3	4
(United States) B Mattek	6	6
WC	(United States) M Brengle	4	1
(United States) M Tu	4	6^{7}
18	(Israel) S Pe'er	6	7^{9}
30	(Poland) A Radwańska	6	6
(Japan) A Morigami	2	1
(France) É Loit	1	2
(France) V Razzano	6	6
(Russia) Y Shvedova	3	2
(Australia) C Dellacqua	6	6
(Italy) R Vinci	0	1
2	(Russia) M Sharapova	6	6

Second round
13	(Czech Republic) N Vaidišová	6	7^{7}
(Italy) F Pennetta	2	6^{0}
(United States) B Mattek	2	1
18	(Israel) S Pe'er	6	6
30	(Poland) A Radwańska	6	6
(France) V Razzano	2	3
(Australia) C Dellacqua	1	0
2	(Russia) M Sharapova	6	6

Third round
13	(Czech Republic) N Vaidišová	4	6	6^{5}
18	(Israel) S Pe'er	6	3	7^{7}
30	(Poland) A Radwańska	6	1	6
2	(Russia) M Sharapova	4	6	2

Fourth round
18	(Israel) S Pe'er	6	6
30	(Poland) A Radwańska	4	1

== Championship match statistics ==
Category	(Belgium) Henin	(Russia) Kuznetsova
1st serve %	34/60 (57%)	48/64 (75%)
1st serve points won	28 of 34 = 82%	26 of 48 = 54%
2nd serve points won	12 of 26 = 46%	8 of 16 = 50%
Total service points won	40 of 60 = 66.67%	34 of 64 = 53.13%
Aces	4	1
Double faults	7	0
Winners	25	11
Unforced errors	21	29
Net points won	10 of 13 = 77%	9 of 12 = 75%
Break points converted	4 of 8 = 50%	0 of 6 = 0%
Return points won	30 of 64 = 47%	20 of 60 = 33%
Total points won	70	54

Preceded by 2007 Wimbledon Championships – Women's singles	Grand Slam women's singles	Succeeded by 2008 Australian Open – Women's singles
