= 2007 US Open – Men's champions invitational =

Men's champions invitational
- 2007 US Open

Final
- Champion: (United States) Todd Martin

Events
Singles	men	women		boys	girls
Doubles	men	women	mixed	boys	girls
WC Singles	men	women	quad
WC Doubles	men	women	quad
Legends	men	women	mixed
← 2006 ·	US Open	· 2008 →

The Men’s Champions Invitational was a round-robin tournament played at the 2007 US Open tennis championships in New York City, USA. Four former tennis champions ("Legends") – Jimmy Arias of the USA, Pat Cash of Australia, Henri Leconte of France, and Todd Martin of the USA – played off against one another to determine the champion. The winner was Todd Martin.

== Draw ==
=== Key ===
- Q = Qualifier
- WC = Wild card
- LL = Lucky loser
- Alt = Alternate
- ITF = ITF entry
- PR = Protected ranking
- SR = Special ranking
- SE = Special exempt
- JE = Junior exempt
- JR = Junior Accelerator Programme entrant
- CO = College Accelerator Programme entrant
- NG = Next Gen Accelerator Program entrant
- w/o = Walkover
- r = Retired
- d = Defaulted

=== Round robin ===
		(United States) Arias	(Australia) Cash	(France) Leconte	(United States) Martin
1	(United States) Jimmy Arias (1-2)		Arias; 2-6, 6-3, 10-6	Leconte; 4-6, 6-3, 10-5	Martin; 6-1, 7-5
2	(Australia) Pat Cash (1-2)	Arias; 2-6, 6-3, 10-6		Cash; 6-4, 6-2	Martin; 6-4, 6-4
3	(France) Henri Leconte (1-2)	Leconte; 4-6, 6-3, 10-5	Cash; 6-4, 6-2		Martin; 7-5, 6-4
4	(United States) Todd Martin (3-0)	Martin; 6-1, 7-5	Martin; 6-4, 6-4	Martin; 7-5, 6-4	

== Champion ==
(United States) Todd Martin
