= 2007 US Open – Girls' doubles =

Girls' doubles
- 2007 US Open

Final
- Champion: (Belarus) Ksenia Milevskaya (Poland) Urszula Radwańska
- Runner-up: (Georgia (country)) Oksana Kalashnikova (Russia) Ksenia Lykina
- Score: 6–1, 6–2

Events
Singles	men	women		boys	girls
Doubles	men	women	mixed	boys	girls
WC Singles	men	women	quad
WC Doubles	men	women	quad
Legends	men	women	mixed
- US Open

The 2007 US Open girls' doubles was an event that was won by Ksenia Milevskaya and Urszula Radwańska, they defeated Oksana Kalashnikova and Ksenia Lykina in the final, 6–1, 6–2.

== Seeds ==
1. (Russia) Anastasia Pavlyuchenkova / (Russia) Ksenia Pervak (second round)
2. (Belarus) Ksenia Milevskaya / (Poland) Urszula Radwańska (Champions)
3. (Georgia (country)) Oksana Kalashnikova / (Russia) Ksenia Lykina (final)
4. (Slovakia) Lenka Juríková / (Poland) Katarzyna Piter (quarterfinals)
5. (United States) Gail Brodsky / (Serbia) Bojana Jovanovski (second round)
6. (South Korea) Sung-Hee Han / (Austria) Nikola Hofmanova (first round)
7. (Australia) Tyra Calderwood / (Israel) Julia Glushko (quarterfinals)
8. (Chinese Taipei) Chang Kai-chen / (United States) Veronica Li (first round)

== Draw ==
Key

- Q = Qualifier
- WC = Wild card
- LL = Lucky loser
- Alt = Alternate
- ITF = ITF entry
- PR = Protected ranking
- SR = Special ranking
- SE = Special exempt
- JE = Junior exempt
- JR = Junior Accelerator Programme entrant
- CO = College Accelerator Programme entrant
- NG = Next Gen Accelerator Program entrant
- w/o = Walkover
- r = Retired
- d = Defaulted

=== Finals ===
Semifinals
(Japan) M Doi (Japan) K Nara	2	4
3	(Georgia (country)) O Kalashnikova (Russia) K Lykina	6	6
WC	(United States) K Frilling (United States) A Muhammad	6^{8}	6^{4}
2	(Belarus) K Milevskaya (Poland) U Radwańska	7^{10}	7^{7}

Final
3	(Georgia (country)) O Kalashnikova (Russia) K Lykina	1	2
2	(Belarus) K Milevskaya (Poland) U Radwańska	6	6

=== Top half ===
First round
1	(Russia) A Pavlyuchenkova (Russia) K Pervak	6	1	6
(United States) M Brengle (United States) K Couts	2	6	3
(Japan) M Doi (Japan) K Nara	5	6	6
(Australia) I Holland (United Kingdom) T Moore	7	3	4
(Argentina) T Búa (Argentina) M Gordo	6	3	4
(United Kingdom) J Curtis (New Zealand) S Jones	2	6	6
(Slovenia) P Hercog (Liechtenstein) S Vogt	6	6
8	(Chinese Taipei) K-c Chang (United States) V Li	4	4
3	(Georgia (country)) O Kalashnikova (Russia) K Lykina	6	6
(France) C Chala (France) N Ciolkowski	0	1
(United States) M Cecil (Portugal) M Larcher de Brito	6^{6}	4
(Australia) J Moore (Mexico) V Pulido	7^{8}	6
(Slovakia) R Tabak (Slovakia) R Zsilinszka	6	2	3
WC	(United States) J Hampton (United States) M Oudin	4	6	6
WC	(United States) J Boserup (United States) C McHale	3	6	3
7	(Australia) T Calderwood (Israel) J Glushko	6	4	6

Second round
1	(Russia) A Pavlyuchenkova (Russia) K Pervak	4	4
(Japan) M Doi (Japan) K Nara	6	6
(United Kingdom) J Curtis (New Zealand) S Jones	4	6	3
(Slovenia) P Hercog (Liechtenstein) S Vogt	6	4	6
3	(Georgia (country)) O Kalashnikova (Russia) K Lykina	7	6
(Australia) J Moore (Mexico) V Pulido	5	1
WC	(United States) J Hampton (United States) M Oudin	4	6^{4}
7	(Australia) T Calderwood (Israel) J Glushko	6	7^{7}

Quarterfinals
(Japan) M Doi (Japan) K Nara	6	3	6
(Slovenia) P Hercog (Liechtenstein) S Vogt	4	6	4
3	(Georgia (country)) O Kalashnikova (Russia) K Lykina	6	5	7
7	(Australia) T Calderwood (Israel) J Glushko	2	7	5

Semifinals
(Japan) M Doi (Japan) K Nara	2	4
3	(Georgia (country)) O Kalashnikova (Russia) K Lykina	6	6

=== Bottom half ===
First round
5	(United States) G Brodsky (Serbia) B Jovanovski	6^{6}	6	6
WC	(United States) N Gibbs (United States) S Stephens	7^{8}	3	0
WC	(United States) K Frilling (United States) A Muhammad	6	6
(United States) A Guarachi (India) P Venkatesh	2	2
(Romania) S Halep (Romania) I Ivan	6	7^{7}
(Uzbekistan) A Kolesnicmenko (United States) V Solovieva	3	6^{4}
(Australia) J Konta (Thailand) N Lertcheewakarn	3	7^{7}	6^{7}
4	(Slovakia) L Juríková (Poland) K Piter	6	6^{5}	7^{9}
6	(South Korea) SH Han (Austria) N Hofmanova	6	5	3
(Slovakia) K Boczová (Slovakia) K Kučová	4	7	6
(Russia) Y Buchina (Russia) E Chernyakova	3	0
(United States) C Vandeweghe (United States) A Will	6	6
(Japan) S Akita (Australia) S Peers	7	6
(South Africa) M Gorny (United States) S Vidov	5	3
(Morocco) N Lalami (United States) T Raykova	0	1
2	(Belarus) K Milevskaya (Poland) U Radwańska	6	6

Second round
5	(United States) G Brodsky (Serbia) B Jovanovski	3	1
WC	(United States) K Frilling (United States) A Muhammad	6	6
(Romania) S Halep (Romania) I Ivan	6^{4}	5
4	(Slovakia) L Juríková (Poland) K Piter	7^{7}	7
(Slovakia) K Boczová (Slovakia) K Kučová	6	7
(United States) C Vandeweghe (United States) A Will	3	5
(Japan) S Akita (Australia) S Peers	5	2
2	(Belarus) K Milevskaya (Poland) U Radwańska	7	6

Quarterfinals
WC	(United States) K Frilling (United States) A Muhammad	4	6	6
4	(Slovakia) L Juríková (Poland) K Piter	6	1	1
(Slovakia) K Boczová (Slovakia) K Kučová	2	2
2	(Belarus) K Milevskaya (Poland) U Radwańska	6	6

Semifinals
WC	(United States) K Frilling (United States) A Muhammad	6^{8}	6^{4}
2	(Belarus) K Milevskaya (Poland) U Radwańska	7^{10}	7^{7}
