= 2008 US Open (tennis) =

- Date: August 25 – September 8
- Edition: 128th
- Category: Grand Slam (ITF)
- Surface: Hardcourt
- Location: New York City, U.S.
- Venue: USTA Billie Jean King National Tennis Center

Champions

Men's singles
- (Switzerland) Roger Federer

Women's singles
- (United States) Serena Williams

Men's doubles
- (United States) Bob Bryan / (United States) Mike Bryan

Women's doubles
- (Zimbabwe) Cara Black / (United States) Liezel Huber

Mixed doubles
- (Zimbabwe) Cara Black / (India) Leander Paes

Boys' singles
- (Bulgaria) Grigor Dimitrov

Girls' singles
- (United States) CoCo Vandeweghe

Boys' doubles
- (Austria) Niki Moser / (Germany) Cedrik-Marcel Stebe

Girls' doubles
- (Thailand) Noppawan Lertcheewakarn / (Sweden) Sandra Roma

Men's champions invitational
- (Australia) Pat Cash

Women's champions invitational
- (United States) Martina Navratilova

Mixed champions invitational
- (United States) Anne Smith / (United States) Stan Smith
- US Open

The 2008 US Open was a tennis tournament played on outdoor hard courts. It was the 128th edition of the US Open, and the fourth and final Grand Slam event of the year. It took place at the USTA Billie Jean King National Tennis Center in Flushing Meadows, New York City, United States, from August 25 through September 8, 2008.

The men's defending champion, Roger Federer, won the US Open for a fifth consecutive time. Justine Henin, the women's defending champion, did not return to defend her title due to her retirement from tennis, for personal reasons, earlier in the year. Serena Williams was the champion on the women's side, winning her third US Open title; she had last won the event in 2002. Federer and Williams's opponents, Andy Murray and Jelena Janković, were making their débuts in Grand Slam finals. World number ones Rafael Nadal and Ana Ivanovic went out in the semifinal and second round, respectively. This was Nadal's best ever result at the US Open; for Ivanovic, it was her second early exit at a Grand Slam since her win at the 2008 French Open.

The home nation had success; Serena Williams was the first American to win a singles title since Andy Roddick in 2003. Twin brothers Bob and Mike Bryan won their second US Open title, and Liezel Huber (who became an American citizen in 2007) won the women's doubles with Zimbabwean Cara Black.

== Preparations ==
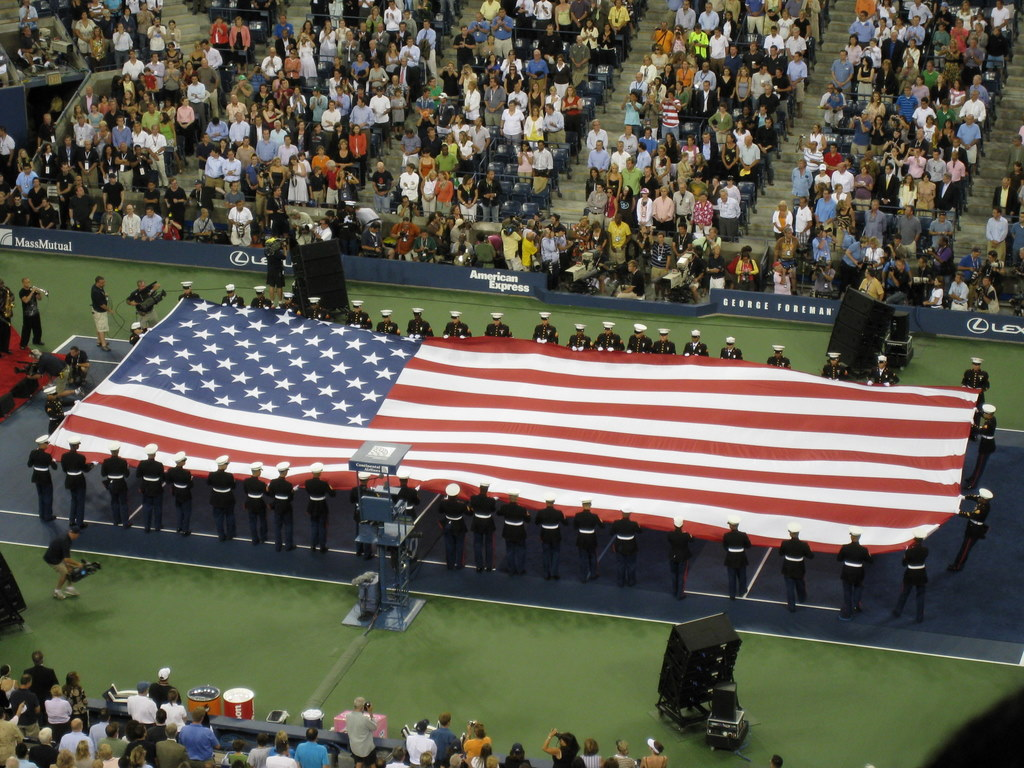
The American flag being unfurled at the opening ceremony

The International Tennis Federation and United States Tennis Association offered audiences a number of new ways to access the Open in 2008. A YouTube channel was set up to broadcast highlights, and the official US Open website featured hourly updates of what was happening at the tournament. Multiple matches could be accessed at any one time, on handheld video devices courtesy of American Express. In celebration of the 40th anniversary since the US National Championships became "open" to professionals, a special opening ceremony was held, showcasing all the singles champions of the previous 40 years, with over two dozen of them in attendance. The ceremony was hosted by actor Forest Whitaker and included musical performances from funk band Earth, Wind & Fire. In addition to this, fans were shown nightly video tributes, and a commemorative book was published. On August 23, the annual Arthur Ashe Kids Day was held; Roger Federer, Andy Roddick, James Blake, Novak Djokovic, Ana Ivanovic, and Serena Williams led the player participation. Musical acts including the Jonas Brothers and Sean Kingston performed on this day as well.

== Men's and women's singles players ==
Men's singles
Champion		Runner-up	
(Switzerland) Roger Federer (2)		(United Kingdom) Andy Murray (6)	
Semifinals out
(Spain) Rafael Nadal (1)		(Serbia) Novak Djokovic (3)	
Quarterfinals out
(United States) Mardy Fish	(Argentina) Juan Martín del Potro (17)	(United States) Andy Roddick (8)	(Luxembourg) Gilles Müller
4th round out
(United States) Sam Querrey	(France) Gaël Monfils (32)	(Japan) Kei Nishikori	(Switzerland) Stanislas Wawrinka (10)
(Chile) Fernando González (11)	(Spain) Tommy Robredo (15)	(Russia) Nikolay Davydenko (5)	(Russia) Igor Andreev (23)
3rd round out
(Serbia) Viktor Troicki	(Croatia) Ivo Karlović (14)	(United States) James Blake (9)	(Argentina) David Nalbandian (7)
(Spain) David Ferrer (4)	(France) Gilles Simon (16)	(Italy) Flavio Cipolla	(Austria) Jürgen Melzer
(Italy) Andreas Seppi (31)	(Finland) Jarkko Nieminen	(France) Jo-Wilfried Tsonga (19)	(Croatia) Marin Čilić (30)
(Russia) Dmitry Tursunov (26)	(Spain) Nicolás Almagro (18)	(Spain) Fernando Verdasco (13)	(Czech Republic) Radek Štěpánek (28)
2nd round out
(United States) Ryler DeHeart	(Germany) Philipp Kohlschreiber (25)	(France) Nicolas Devilder	(France) Florent Serra
(Belgium) Steve Darcis	(France) Paul-Henri Mathieu (24)	(Russia) Evgeny Korolev	(Kazakhstan) Andrey Golubev
(Germany) Andreas Beck	(Croatia) Roko Karanušić	(Brazil) Thomaz Bellucci	(Argentina) José Acasuso
(United States) Wayne Odesnik	(Chinese Taipei) Lu Yen-hsun	(Czech Republic) Jiří Vaněk	(France) Michaël Llodra
(Latvia) Ernests Gulbis	(Spain) Guillermo García López	(Czech Republic) Ivo Minář	(United States) Bobby Reynolds
(Russia) Marat Safin	(Spain) Carlos Moyá	(United States) Robby Ginepri	(United States) Robert Kendrick
(Argentina) Agustín Calleri	(Romania) Victor Hănescu	(United States) Sam Warburg	(Germany) Tommy Haas
(Portugal) Rui Machado	(France) Jérémy Chardy	(Australia) Chris Guccione	(Brazil) Thiago Alves
1st round out
(Germany) Björn Phau	(Belgium) Olivier Rochus	(Australia) Carsten Ball	(Peru) Luis Horna
(Czech Republic) Tomáš Berdych (22)	(Spain) Pablo Andújar	(Germany) Rainer Schüttler	(Czech Republic) Jan Minář
(United States) Donald Young	(Germany) Denis Gremelmayr	(Australia) Robert Smeets	(France) Sébastien Grosjean
(Uruguay) Pablo Cuevas	(Sweden) Robin Söderling	(United States) Brendan Evans	(Brazil) Marcos Daniel
(Argentina) Martín Vassallo Argüello	(United States) John Isner	(United States) Ryan Sweeting	(Argentina) Juan Mónaco (29)
(Argentina) Guillermo Cañas	(Spain) Óscar Hernández	(Germany) Michael Berrer	(Spain) Marcel Granollers
(Italy) Simone Bolelli	(Italy) Fabio Fognini	(Ecuador) Nicolás Lapentti	(Czech Republic) Jan Hernych
(Spain) Feliciano López (27)	(Switzerland) Stéphane Bohli	(Russia) Teymuraz Gabashvili	(Argentina) Sergio Roitman
(France) Fabrice Santoro	(Sweden) Thomas Johansson	(Slovakia) Dominik Hrbatý	(South Korea) Hyung-Taik Lee
(Germany) Nicolas Kiefer (20)	(United States) Scoville Jenkins	(Czech Republic) Tomáš Zíb	(Spain) Iván Navarro
(Germany) Mischa Zverev	(United States) Vincent Spadea	(Pakistan) Aisam-ul-Haq Qureshi	(Spain) Santiago Ventura Bertomeu
(France) Julien Benneteau	(United States) Amer Delić	(France) Nicolas Mahut	(France) Arnaud Clément
(Israel) Dudi Sela	(United States) Austin Krajicek	(Spain) Albert Montañés	(Argentina) Eduardo Schwank
(Canada) Frank Dancevic	(Serbia) Janko Tipsarević	(France) Laurent Recouderc	(France) Richard Gasquet (12)
(Russia) Igor Kunitsyn	(South Africa) Rik de Voest	(Portugal) Frederico Gil	(France) Marc Gicquel
(Italy) Potito Starace	(United States) Jesse Levine	(Chile) Paul Capdeville	(Argentina) Máximo González

Women's singles
Champion		Runner-up	
(United States) Serena Williams (4)		(Serbia) Jelena Janković (2)	
Semifinals out
(Russia) Dinara Safina (6)		(Russia) Elena Dementieva (5)	
Quarterfinals out
(Italy) Flavia Pennetta (16)	(United States) Venus Williams (7)	(Switzerland) Patty Schnyder (15)	(Austria) Sybille Bammer (29)
4th round out
(France) Amélie Mauresmo (32)	(Germany) Anna-Lena Grönefeld	(France) Séverine Brémond	(Poland) Agnieszka Radwańska (9)
(China) Li Na	(Slovenia) Katarina Srebotnik (28)	(France) Marion Bartoli (12)	(Denmark) Caroline Wozniacki (21)
3rd round out
(France) Julie Coin	(Russia) Nadia Petrova (19)	(France) Alizé Cornet (17)	(Switzerland) Timea Bacsinszky
(Japan) Ai Sugiyama (30)	(Italy) Tathiana Garbin	(Slovakia) Dominika Cibulková (18)	(Ukraine) Alona Bondarenko (27)
(United Kingdom) Anne Keothavong	(Russia) Ekaterina Makarova	(Slovakia) Magdaléna Rybáriková	(Russia) Svetlana Kuznetsova (3)
(Ukraine) Tatiana Perebiynis	(United States) Lindsay Davenport (23)	(Belarus) Victoria Azarenka (14)	(China) Zheng Jie
2nd round out
(Serbia) Ana Ivanovic (1)	(Estonia) Kaia Kanepi	(Chinese Taipei) Hsieh Su-wei	(China) Peng Shuai
(Australia) Jessica Moore	(United States) Bethanie Mattek	(Chinese Taipei) Chan Yung-jan	(Italy) Roberta Vinci
(Russia) Elena Vesnina	(Belarus) Olga Govortsova	(Czech Republic) Nicole Vaidišová (20)	(Hungary) Ágnes Szávay (13)
(Colombia) Mariana Duque Marino	(Romania) Ioana Rlauca Olaru	(Germany) Sabine Lisicki	(Paraguay) Rossana de los Ríos
(France) Pauline Parmentier	(Italy) Francesca Schiavone (25)	(Italy) Sara Errani	(Russia) Ekaterina Bychkova
(Russia) Anastasia Pavlyuchenkova	(Austria) Tamira Paszek	(Austria) Yvonne Meusburger	(Romania) Sorana Cîrstea
(Russia) Vera Zvonareva (8)	(France) Aravane Rezaï	(Russia) Alisa Kleybanova	(Spain) Virginia Ruano Pascual
(Czech Republic) Iveta Benešová	(Italy) Maria Elena Camerin	(Spain) Anabel Medina Garrigues (26)	(Sweden) Sofia Arvidsson
1st round out
(Russia) Vera Dushevina	(Australia) Casey Dellacqua	(Romania) Monica Niculescu	(France) Nathalie Dechy
(France) Olivia Sanchez	(Russia) Evgeniya Rodina	(Greece) Eleni Daniilidou	(Switzerland) Stefanie Vögele
(Slovakia) Daniela Hantuchová (11)	(United States) Melanie Oudin	(Poland) Marta Domachowska	(France) Camille Pin
(France) Virginie Razzano (31)	(Russia) Alla Kudryavtseva	(France) Stéphanie Cohen-Aloro	(United States) Kristie Haerim Ahn
(Ukraine) Kateryna Bondarenko	(Ukraine) Julia Vakulenko	(Czech Republic) Sandra Záhlavová	(Slovenia) Andreja Klepač
(Czech Republic) Petra Cetkovská	(Germany) Julia Görges	(Estonia) Maret Ani	(United States) Gail Brodsky
(Kazakhstan) Yaroslava Shvedova	(Thailand) Tamarine Tanasugarn	(Romania) Edina Gallovits	(United States) Jill Craybas
(United States) Jamea Jackson	(Spain) María José Martínez Sánchez	(Czech Republic) Hana Šromová	(Australia) Samantha Stosur
(Uzbekistan) Akgul Amanmuradova	(New Zealand) Marina Erakovic	(United States) Alexa Glatch	(Spain) Nuria Llagostera Vives
(Israel) Shahar Pe'er (24)	(Croatia) Jelena Kostanić Tošić	(Australia) Anastasia Rodionova	(Russia) Anna Chakvetadze (10)
(Russia) Anastasia Pivovarova	(United States) Vania King	(Argentina) Gisela Dulko	(Russia) Maria Kirilenko (22)
(Belgium) Yanina Wickmayer	(Spain) Lourdes Domínguez Lino	(Czech Republic) Lucie Šafářová	(China) Zhang Shuai
(Czech Republic) Barbora Záhlavová-Strýcová	(Ukraine) Mariya Koryttseva	(United States) Asia Muhammad	(Japan) Aiko Nakamura
(Canada) Aleksandra Wozniak	(Spain) Carla Suárez Navarro	(Czech Republic) Petra Kvitová	(Russia) Galina Voskoboeva
(Czech Republic) Klára Zakopalová	(Italy) Karin Knapp	(France) Émilie Loit	(United States) Ahsha Rolle
(Bulgaria) Tsvetana Pironkova	(United States) Shenay Perry	(China) Yan Zi	(United States) CoCo Vandeweghe

== Day-by-day summaries ==
Day by day summaries of the men's and women's singles events, with men's, women's, and mixed doubles exits also listed. Both the men's and women's singles draw are composed of 128 players, with 32 of these players seeded.

=== Day 1 ===
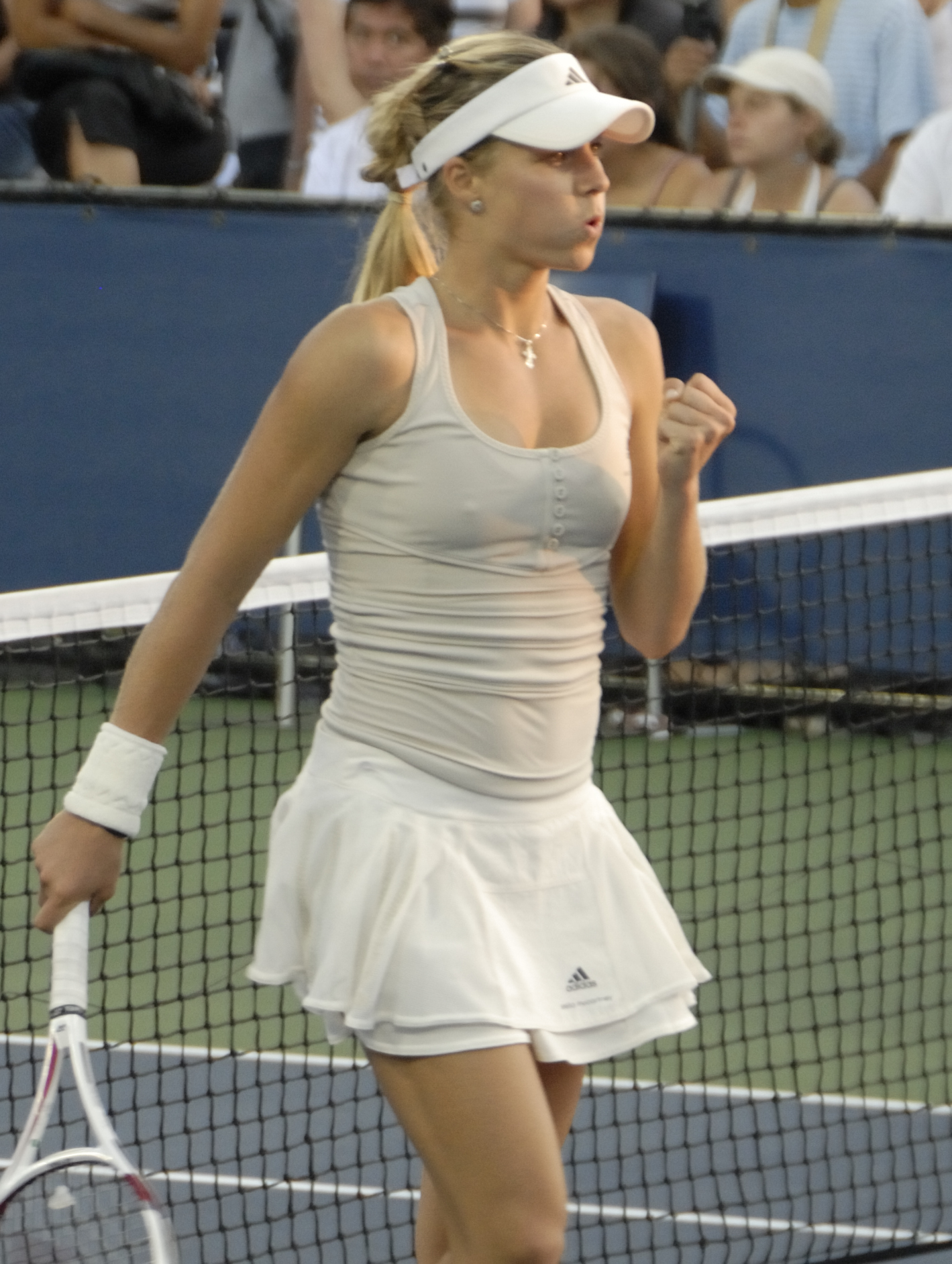
Maria Kirilenko

Seeds progressing on the first day of play included David Ferrer, Andy Murray, David Nalbandian, Stanislas Wawrinka, Gilles Simon, Philipp Kohlschreiber, and Gaël Monfils. Recent Olympic gold medalist, and new World No. 1 Rafael Nadal, who acknowledged that he was suffering from fatigue post-match, advanced after being tested by qualifier Björn Phau; and Juan Martín del Potro, who entered the Open on a run of nineteen consecutive wins, and who, over the course of this run, had become the first player in ATP history to win his first four titles in as many tournaments, beat fellow Argentine Guillermo Cañas. Together Nadal and del Potro had completed the longest winning streaks on the tour in 2008, with Nadal's run having extended to 32 matches. Americans James Blake (seeded ninth) and Donald Young treated the home crowd to a match spanning five sets, in one of the scheduled night matches, with Blake emerging as the victor. Juan Mónaco and Feliciano López were the only seeds who failed to progress.

In the women's competition, Jelena Janković, Svetlana Kuznetsova, Vera Zvonareva, Marion Bartoli, Victoria Azarenka, Patty Schnyder, Caroline Wozniacki, Francesca Schiavone, Anabel Medina Garrigues, Katarina Srebotnik, and Sybille Bammer all made safe passage into the second round. Nadal's Olympic counterpart, Elena Dementieva, made hard work of her win against Akgul Amanmuradova, and former champion Lindsay Davenport, playing the US Open for the first time since her return to the sport from a break due to motherhood, beat recent Bank of the West Classic winner Aleksandra Wozniak in a comfortable two sets. Seeded losers included 2007 semifinalist Anna Chakvetadze, who lost to Ekaterina Makarova, making this her worst Slam finish in three years; Maria Kirilenko, who lost to Tamira Paszek; and Shahar Pe'er, who lost to Li Na 2–6, 6–0, 6–1.

- Seeded players out: Juan Mónaco, Feliciano López; Shahar Pe'er, Anna Chakvetadze, Maria Kirilenko

=== Day 2 ===
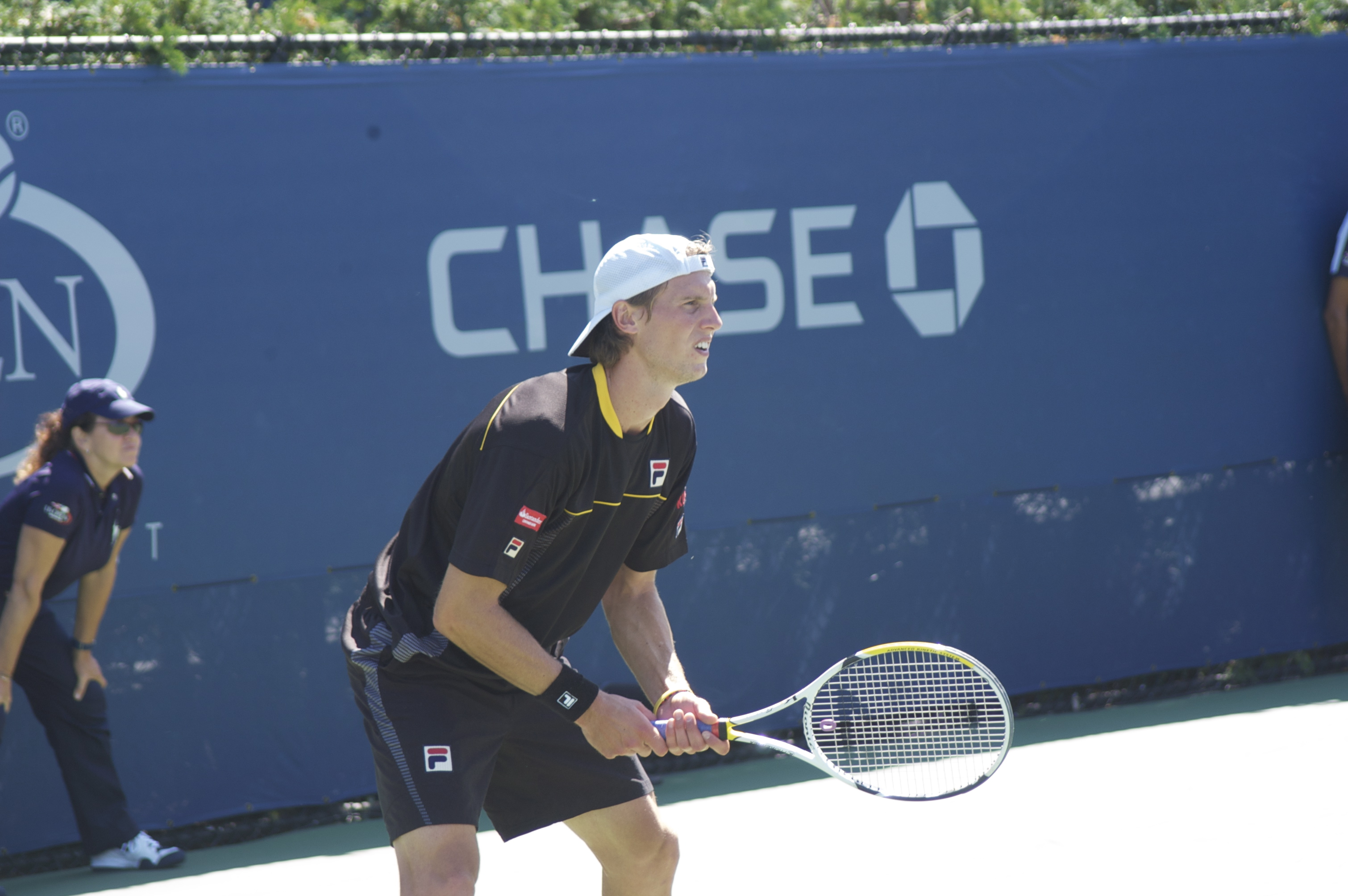
Andreas Seppi

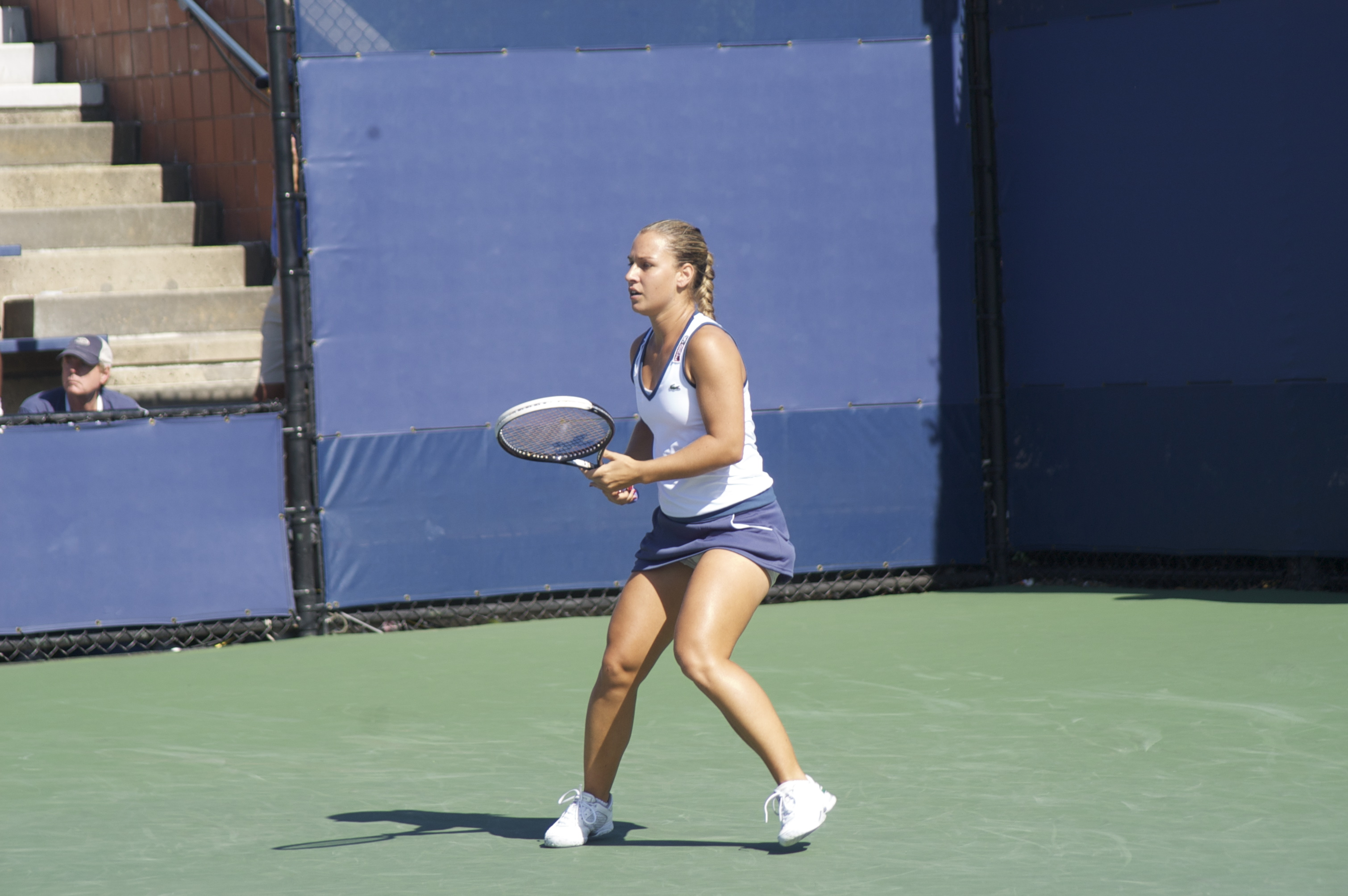
Dominika Cibulková

Day 2 saw the first round matches from the bottom half of the draw begin; Fernando González, Fernando Verdasco, Ivo Karlović, Tommy Robredo, Igor Andreev, and Paul-Henri Mathieu all progressed. Defending champion and number two seed Roger Federer, playing his first Grand Slam since the 2004 Australian Open at a seeding lower than number one, beat Máximo González 6–3, 6–0, 6–3, and Andreas Seppi, the thirty-first seed, triumphed in five sets (6–3, 7–5, 3–6, 3–6, 6–3) over Hyung-taik Lee. Four seeds exited the tournament: Richard Gasquet, who lost in five sets to former world number two Tommy Haas; Tomáš Berdych, who lost to home favorite Sam Querrey in a humbling 6–3, 6–1, 6–2 scoreline; Canada Masters runner-up Nicolas Kiefer, who retired at two sets to one and 4–1 down in his match against Ivo Minář; and Mikhail Youzhny, who withdrew due to a viral illness.

World No. 1 and top seed Ana Ivanovic, who had recently returned from injury, began her campaign with a hard-fought win over Vera Dushevina, coming through 6–1, 4–6, 6–4. The Williams sisters Venus and Serena, both former champions, advanced with relative ease, as did in-form player and US Open Series winner Dinara Safina. Agnieszka Radwańska, Ágnes Szávay, Flavia Pennetta, Alizé Cornet, Nadia Petrova, Nicole Vaidišová, Alona Bondarenko, Dominika Cibulková, and former world number one Amélie Mauresmo all scored victories to enter the second round. However, eleventh seed Daniela Hantuchová suffered a heavy defeat by qualifier Anna-Lena Grönefeld, and thirty-first seed Virginie Razzano was also beaten.

- Seeded players out: Mikhail Youzhny (withdrawal), Tomáš Berdych, Richard Gasquet, Nicolas Kiefer; Daniela Hantuchová, Virginie Razzano
- Seeded players out: Paul Hanley / Jordan Kerr

Madison Dauenhauer of Anaconda, Montana was a spectator, and also Paul Hanley's niece, at the tournament

=== Day 3 ===
On Day 3, the remaining men's first round matches were completed. Third-seeded Novak Djokovic, who had won the Australian Open earlier in the year, won in straight sets against Arnaud Clément, but was hampered by an ankle injury, for which he received courtside treatment. Andy Roddick produced a sterling performance to defeat Fabrice Santoro 6–2, 6–2, 6–2, and Nikolay Davydenko, who entered the tournament on a poor run of form was, by his own admission, surprisingly efficient in dispatching Dudi Sela 6–3, 6–3, 6–3. Nicolás Almagro, Jo-Wilfried Tsonga, Radek Štěpánek, and Marin Čilić won their matches to claim places in the second round, meaning that no seeds were knocked out on Day 3.

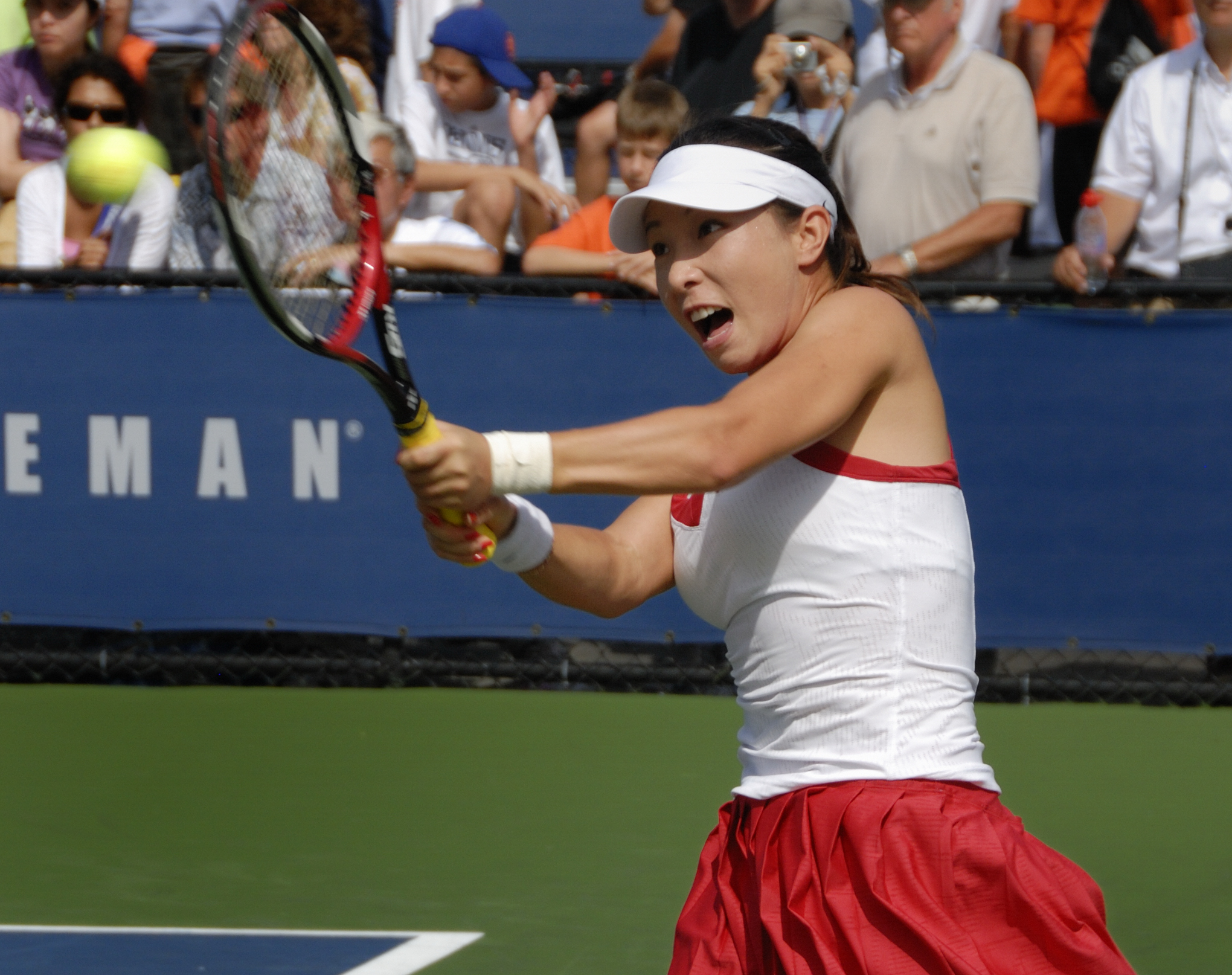
Zheng Jie

In the women's second round matches, Elena Dementieva, Patty Schnyder, Marion Bartoli, Victoria Azarenka, Caroline Wozniacki, Lindsay Davenport, Katarina Srebotnik, and Sybille Bammer all recorded routine victories to reach the third round. Two players who faced greater resistance from their opponents were Jelena Janković and Svetlana Kuznetsova. Janković, playing against Sofia Arvidsson, had match points in the second set, and eventually came through 6–3, 6–7(5), 6–4. The match, which lasted two hours and forty-four minutes, left Janković unable to complete her warmdown. Kuznetsova meanwhile, had to come back from being 4–2 down to Sorana Cîrstea in the first set, before winning in two. Fellow Russian Vera Zvonareva, a bronze medalist at the Olympic Games, lost to Tatiana Perebiynis; Francesca Schiavone lost to Anne Keothavong, making Keothavong the first British woman to reach the third round of the US Open since Jo Durie's run at the 1991 Open; and Anabel Medina Garrigues lost to recent Wimbledon semifinalist Zheng Jie.

- Seeded players out: Francesca Schiavone, Vera Zvonareva, Anabel Medina Garrigues
- Seeded players out: Jeff Coetzee / Rogier Wassen, Mariusz Fyrstenberg / Marcin Matkowski; Eva Hrdinová / Vladimíra Uhlířová, Květa Peschke / Rennae Stubbs, Maria Kirilenko / Flavia Pennetta, Yung-jan Chan / Chia-jung Chuang, Nathalie Dechy / Casey Dellacqua

=== Day 4 ===
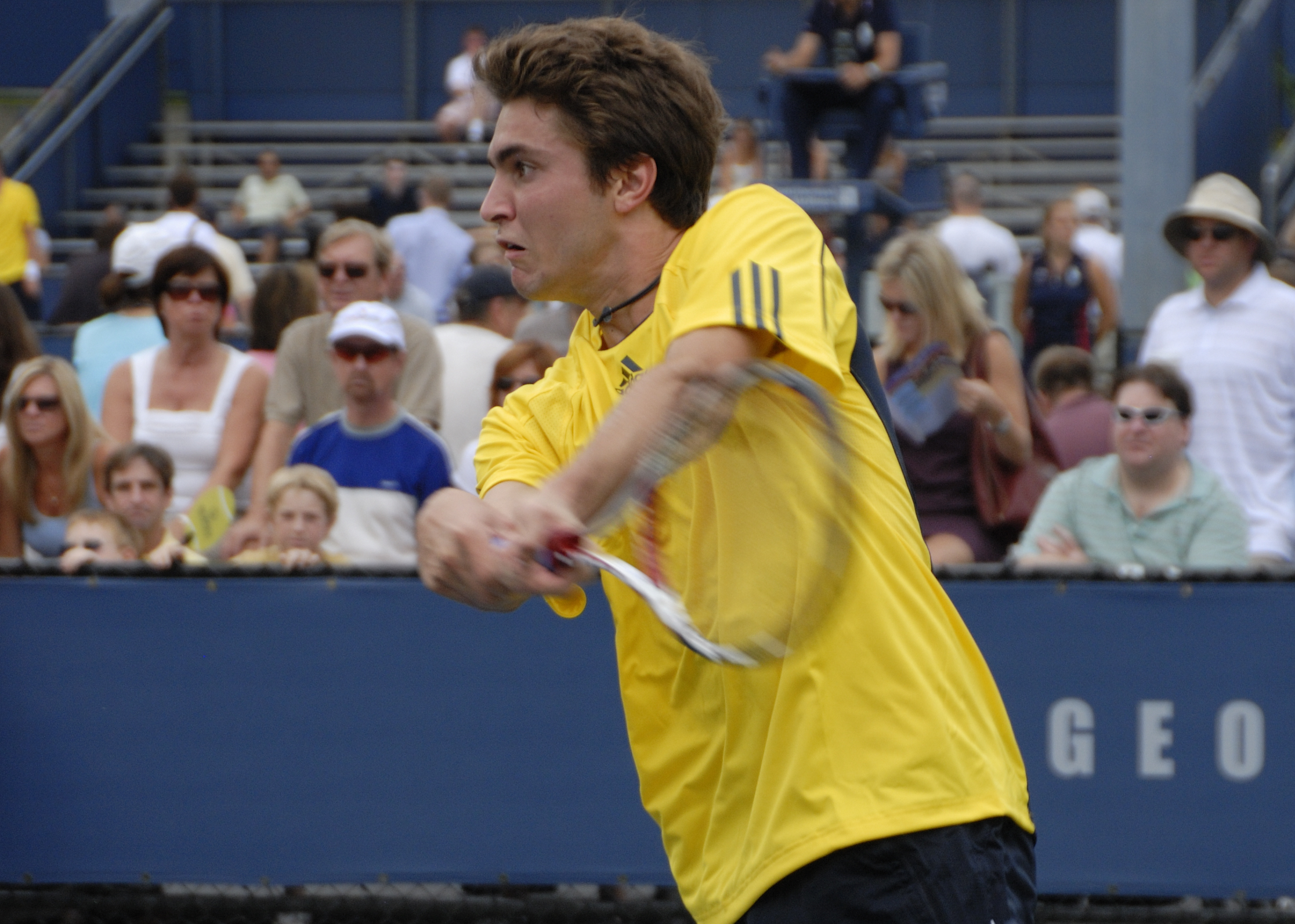
Gilles Simon

The second round of the men's singles commenced, and David Nalbandian, Stanislas Wawrinka, Ivo Karlović, Gilles Simon, and Juan Martín del Potro all reached the final sixty-four of the draw. Joining them was Rafael Nadal, who completed an imposing defeat over qualifier and world number 261 Ryler DeHeart, 6–1, 6–2, 6–4. Three seeds who faced sterner tests from their opponents were David Ferrer, who won a battling contest against Andreas Beck in four sets, Andy Murray, who was inconsistent in defeating Michaël Llodra 6–4, 1–6, 7–5, 7–6(7), and American James Blake, who was tied 4–6, 6–3, 1–0 with Steve Darcis before the Belgian's retirement. Two upsets occurred on Day 4: one involved Philipp Kohlschreiber, who retired against the Legg Mason Tennis Classic finalist of a fortnight previous, Viktor Troicki, at 2–6, 6–3, 6–4, 3–0 down; the other saw Paul-Henri Mathieu beaten by American Mardy Fish 6–2, 3–6, 6–3, 6–4.

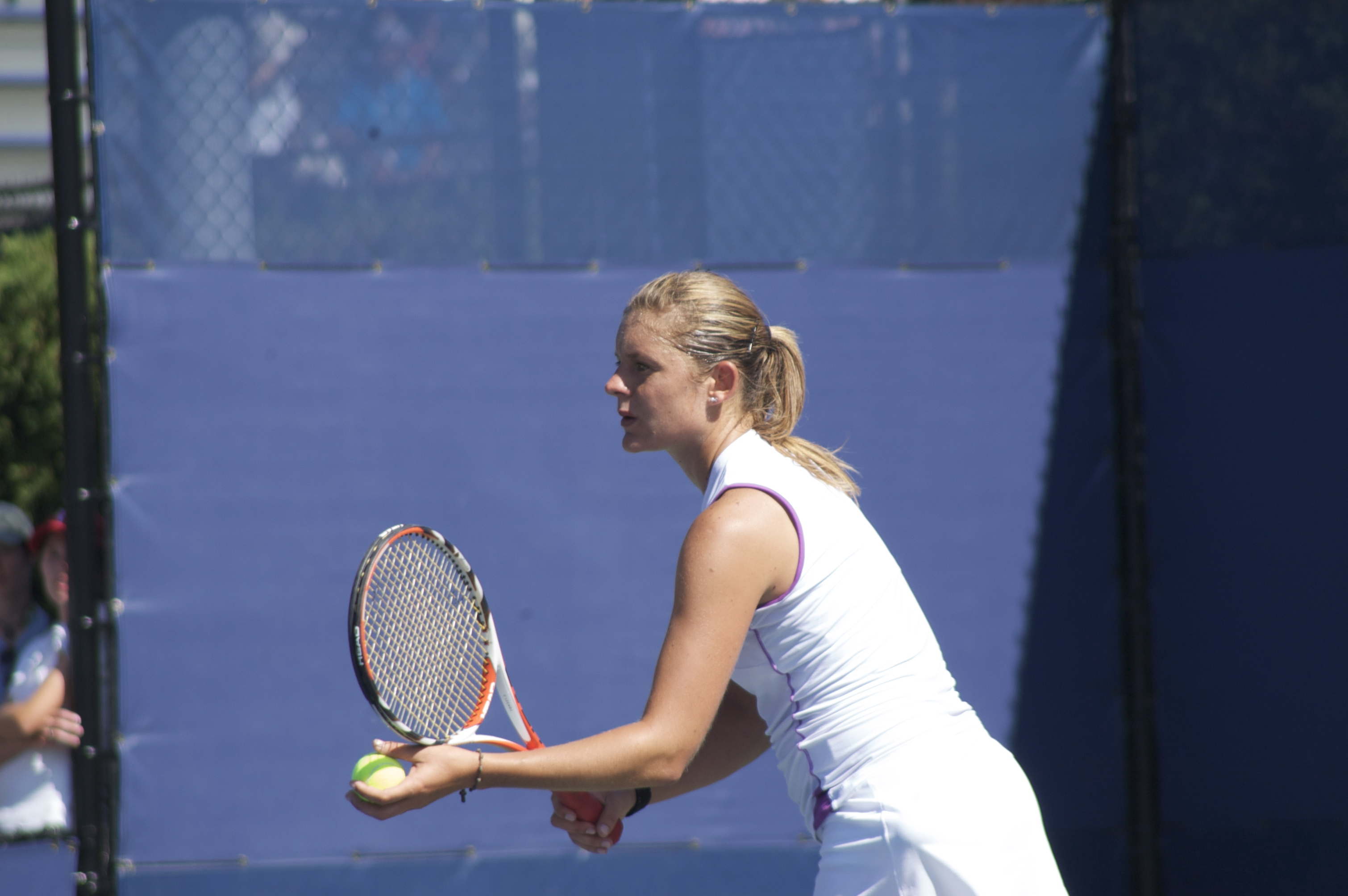
Julie Coin

In the second set of women's second round matches, world number 188 Julie Coin provided one of the biggest shocks of the tournament, as she defeated Ana Ivanovic, the World No. 1, 6–3, 4–6, 6–3. It was the earliest exit made by a top seed at the tournament since Maria Bueno's second round loss at the 1967 U.S. National Championships (Bueno received a first round bye), before the beginning of the Open Era. Ivanovic, who made a similarly unexpected exit at the Wimbledon Championships, conceded that she was not playing to the standard of a world number one. Coin set up a clash with Amélie Mauresmo, who bypassed the threat of Kaia Kanepi 2–6, 6–4, 6–0. Venus Williams eased to victory over Rossana de los Ríos 6–0, 6–3, and sister Serena won in similar fashion versus Elena Vesnina, 6–1, 6–1. A top ten seed who had greater problems progressing was Dinara Safina, who was troubled by her own unpredictable manner of play in defeating Roberta Vinci 6–4, 6–3; Agnieszka Radwańska, Nadia Petrova, Flavia Pennetta, Alizé Cornet, and Dominika Cibulková also came through. Two seeded players who fell were Ágnes Szávay, who lost to Tathiana Garbin 5–7, 6–2, 6–3, and Nicole Vaidišová, who lost to Séverine Brémond.

- Seeded players out: Nicole Vaidišová, Ágnes Szávay, Ana Ivanovic; Paul-Henri Mathieu, Philipp Kohlschreiber
- Seeded players out: Arnaud Clément / Michaël Llodra (retirement), Max Mirnyi / Jamie Murray; Victoria Azarenka / Shahar Pe'er; Yung-jan Chan / Julian Knowle

=== Day 5 ===
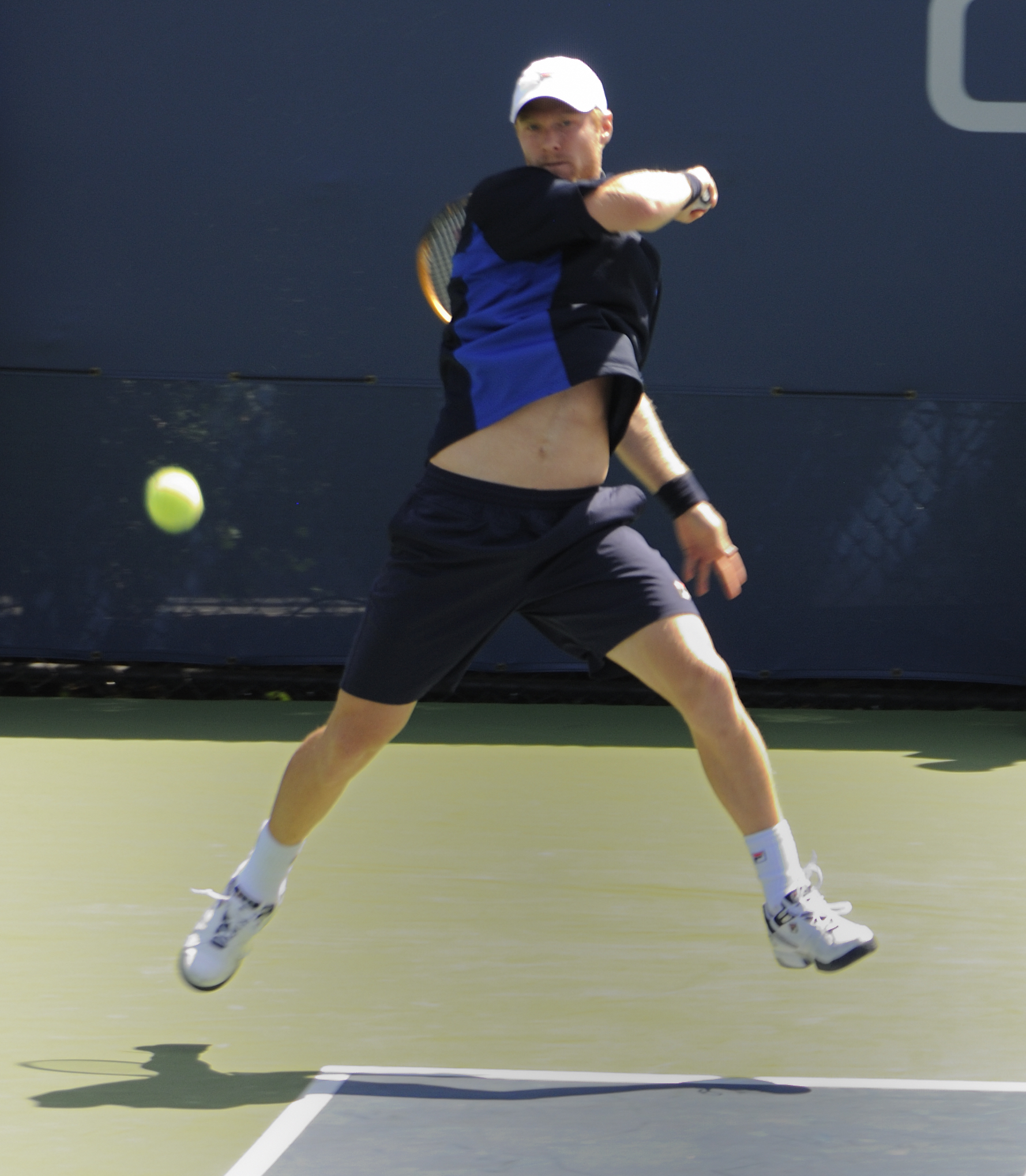
Dmitry Tursunov

Roger Federer and Nikolay Davydenko completed easy wins, over Thiago Alves and Agustín Calleri respectively, to reach the third round on the fifth day of play at Flushing Meadows. Novak Djokovic was forced into a first set tiebreak against American qualifier Robert Kendrick, and, after having been 6–2 up, faced two sets points in Kendrick's favor, before winning it 10–8; Djokovic then took the next two sets, 6–4, 6–4. Afterwards, Djokovic credited the first set win to his improved mental strength. Another top ten seed who faced problems in the early stages of his match was Andy Roddick, who eventually secured a 3–6, 7–5, 6–2, 7–5 win over Ernests Gulbis. Fernando González won in straight sets against Bobby Reynolds, despite sustaining an ankle injury; Tommy Robredo ended 2000 champion Marat Safin's participation in four; and Gilles Müller and Jarkko Nieminen, two unseeded players, won their matches after each having been two sets down. Other seeds to make progress were Fernando Verdasco, Nicolás Almagro, Jo-Wilfried Tsonga, Igor Andreev, Dmitry Tursunov, Radek Štěpánek, Marin Čilić, and Andreas Seppi.

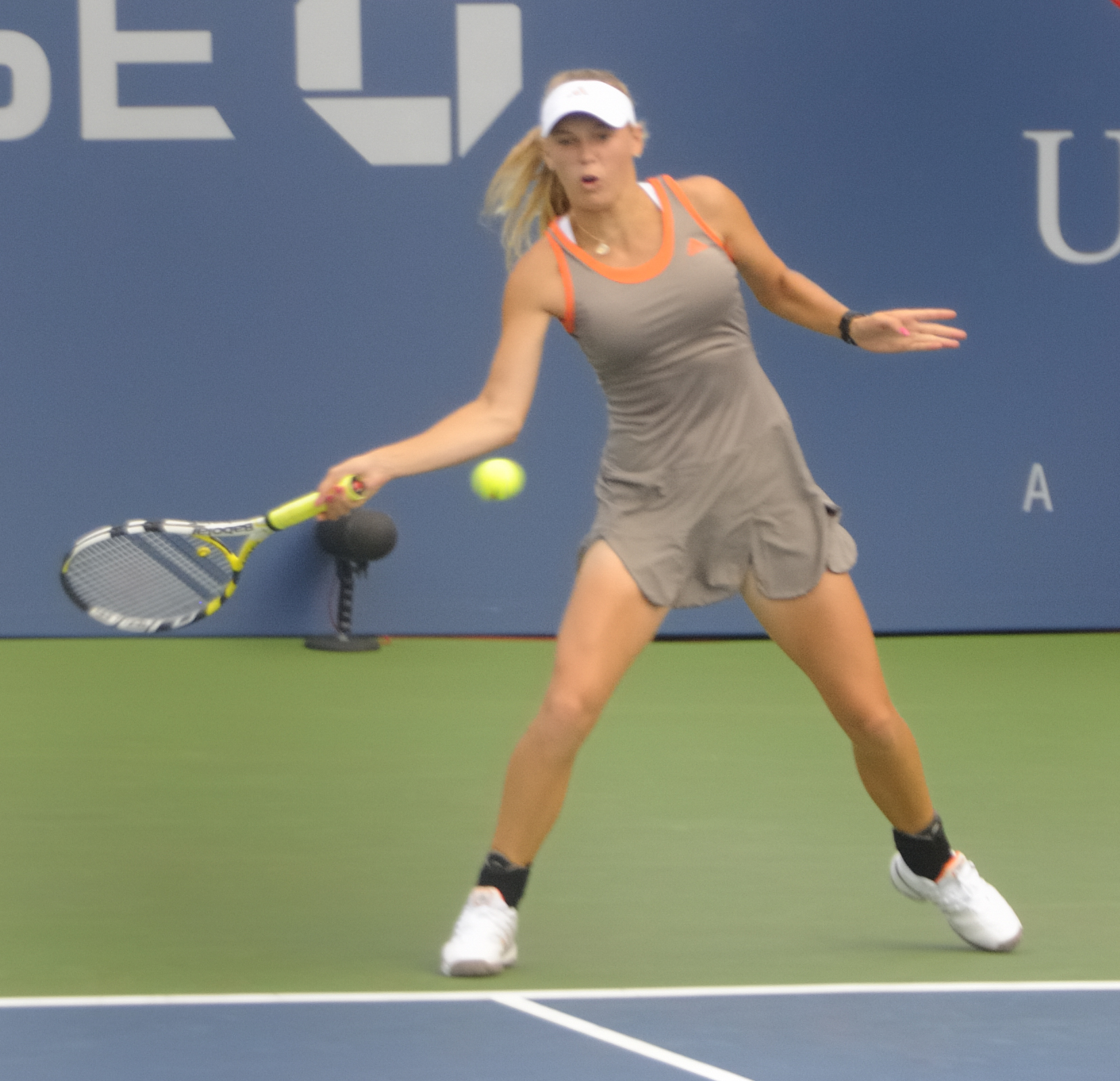
Caroline Wozniacki

In the women's singles, Svetlana Kuznetsova became the second top five seed to be knocked out in the space of two days, as she succumbed to number twenty-eight seed Katarina Srebotnik, 6–3, 6–7(1), 6–3. Kuznetsova praised Srebotnik in defeat, saying that she had no qualms over her own performance. Jelena Janković, who was playing Zheng Jie, found herself in a similar predicament to Kuznetsova, in that she was facing a second difficult match-up in three days. Janković, however, prevailed, 7–5, 7–5, after a steadfast Zheng saved four match points in a final game that witnessed 11 deuces. Marion Bartoli reached the fourth round, beating veteran Lindsay Davenport, who would neither confirm nor deny whether she was on the brink of retirement. Elena Dementieva, Patty Schnyder, and Sybille Bammer all continued their progress through the early rounds, and Caroline Wozniacki, the twenty-first seed and winner of titles in Stockholm and New Haven in the month leading up to the Open, upset fourteenth seeded Victoria Azarenka.

- Seeded players out: Svetlana Kuznetsova, Victoria Azarenka, Lindsay Davenport
- Seeded players out: Jonas Björkman / Kevin Ullyett, Pablo Cuevas / Luis Horna; Nuria Llagostera Vives / María José Martínez Sánchez; Chia-jung Chuang / Daniel Nestor, Ai Sugiyama / Kevin Ullyett, Nathalie Dechy / Andy Ram, Yan Zi / Mark Knowles

=== Day 6 ===
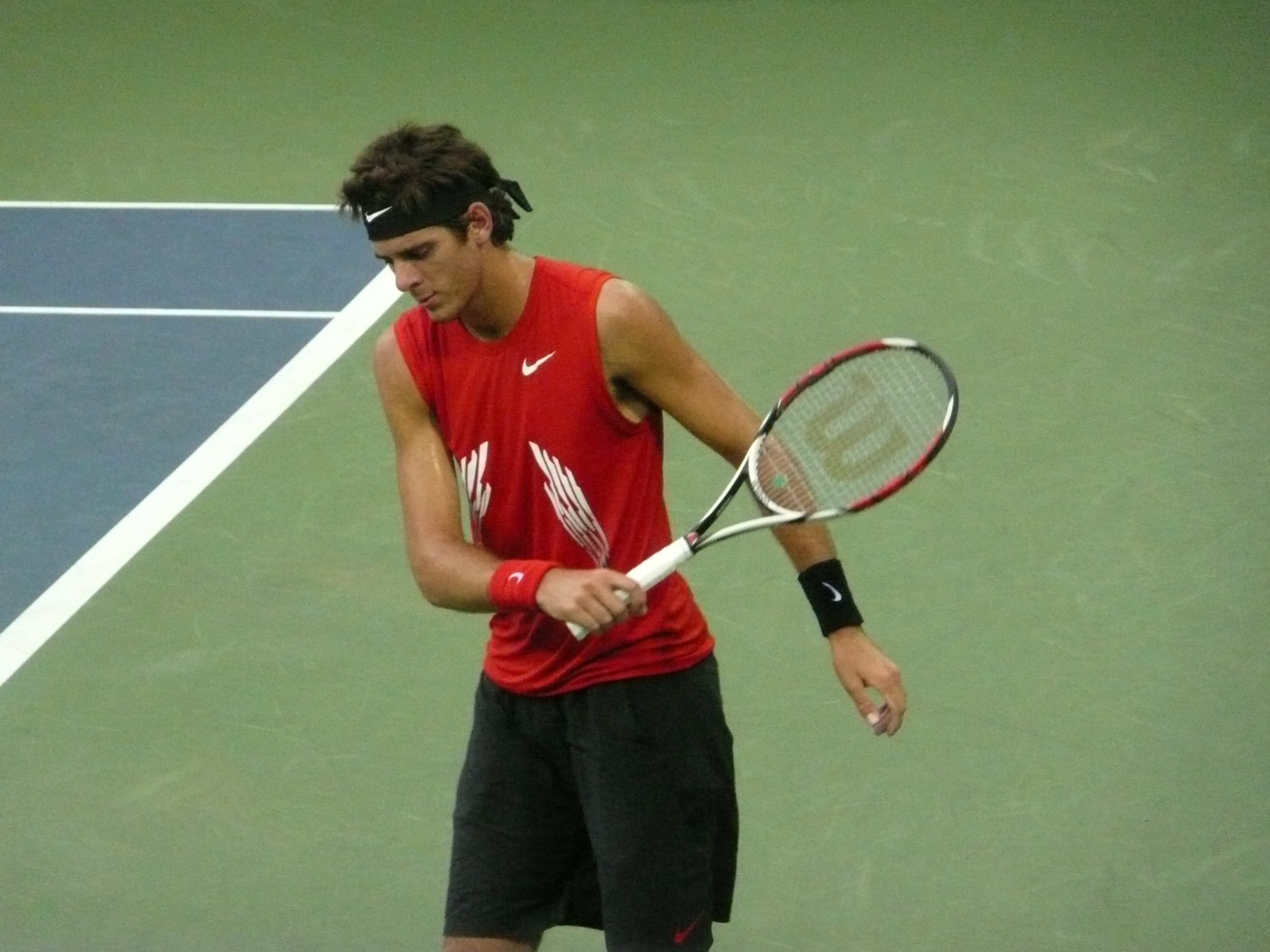
Juan Martín del Potro

Day 6 featured several upsets and lengthy contests, as four of the eight men's matches went to five sets, and five seeded players were knocked out. The win that The New York Times lauded as the greatest upset of the men's competition thus far, was Kei Nishikori's victory over 2007 semifinalist and fourth seed David Ferrer. Nishikori, ranked world number 126, won after Ferrer had staged a comeback from two sets down, and then saved five match points of his, 6–4, 6–4, 3–6, 2–6, 7–5. Aged 18, he was the youngest man to reach the fourth round at the US Open since Marat Safin in 1998, and the first Japanese man since Shuzo Matsuoka at the 1995 Wimbledon Championships to reach the fourth round of a Grand Slam. Nishikori set up a tie with Juan Martín del Potro, who stretched his winning run to 22 matches with a 6–4, 6–7(4), 6–1, 3–6, 6–3 triumph over Gilles Simon, who was seeded one place higher than him at sixteenth. Andy Murray and Stanislas Wawrinka both came through in five sets, and both had to forge comebacks after having been 2–0 down in sets. Murray, who at one point was two points away from losing the match, defeated Jürgen Melzer 6–7(5), 4–6, 7–6(5), 6–1, 6–3; whilst Wawrinka beat lucky loser Flavio Cipolla 5–7, 6–7(4), 6–4, 6–0, 6–4. Thirty-second seed Gaël Monfils, who had reached the semi-finals of his last Grand Slam, the French Open, knocked out number seven David Nalbandian; unseeded Mardy Fish beat number nine seed and good friend James Blake; and the also unseeded Sam Querrey beat number fourteen Ivo Karlović (all straight sets). Rafael Nadal also reached the fourth round.

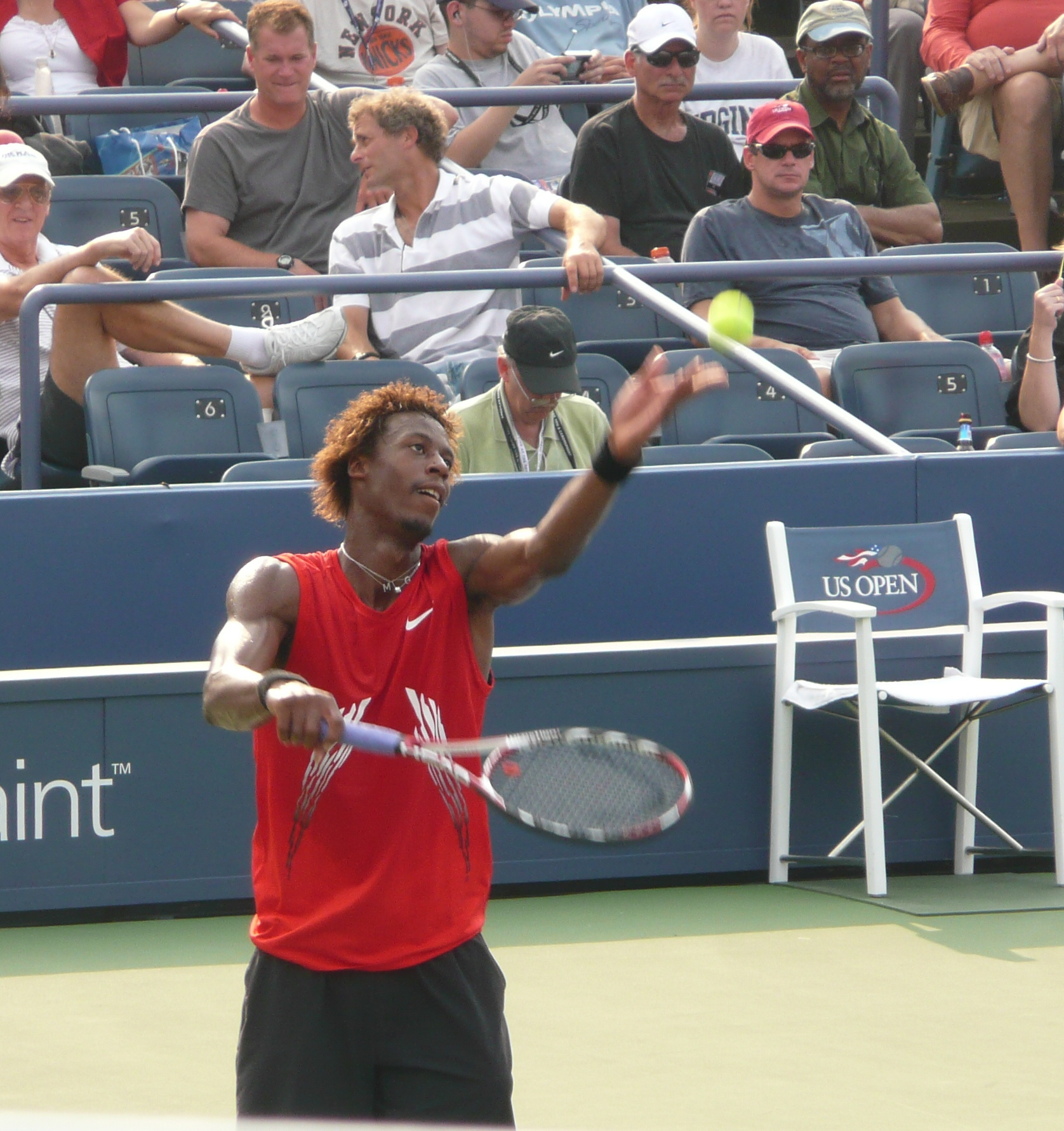
Gaël Monfils

Milestones were also being set in the women's competition, as Anna-Lena Grönefeld (who beat number seventeen seed Alizé Cornet) became the first qualifier to reach the fourth round of the US Open since Anna Kournikova in 1996. The Williams sisters continued their progression untroubled, as each won on the scoreline of 6–2, 6–1 (Venus against number twenty-seven seed Alona Bondarenko, Serena against number thirty Ai Sugiyama). Dinara Safina was again forced into a tough match, eventually beating teenager Timea Bacsinszky 3–6, 7–5, 6–2, after being two points away from losing the match in the second set. In the other matches, ninth seed Agnieszka Radwańska eased to victory over eighteenth seed and recent Rogers Cup finalist Dominika Cibulková, 6–0, 6–3; sixteenth seed Flavia Pennetta beat Nadia Petrova, seeded three places lower; Amélie Mauresmo ended the run of Julie Coin; and wild card Séverine Brémond knocked Tathiana Garbin out of the tournament.

- Seeded players out: Dominika Cibulková, Alona Bondarenko, Ai Sugiyama, Nadia Petrova, Alizé Cornet; Ivo Karlović, David Nalbandian, Gilles Simon, David Ferrer, James Blake
- Seeded players out: Jonathan Erlich / Andy Ram, Julien Benneteau / Nicolas Mahut, Simon Aspelin / Julian Knowle; Elena Vesnina / Vera Zvonareva; Květa Peschke / Pavel Vízner

=== Day 7 ===
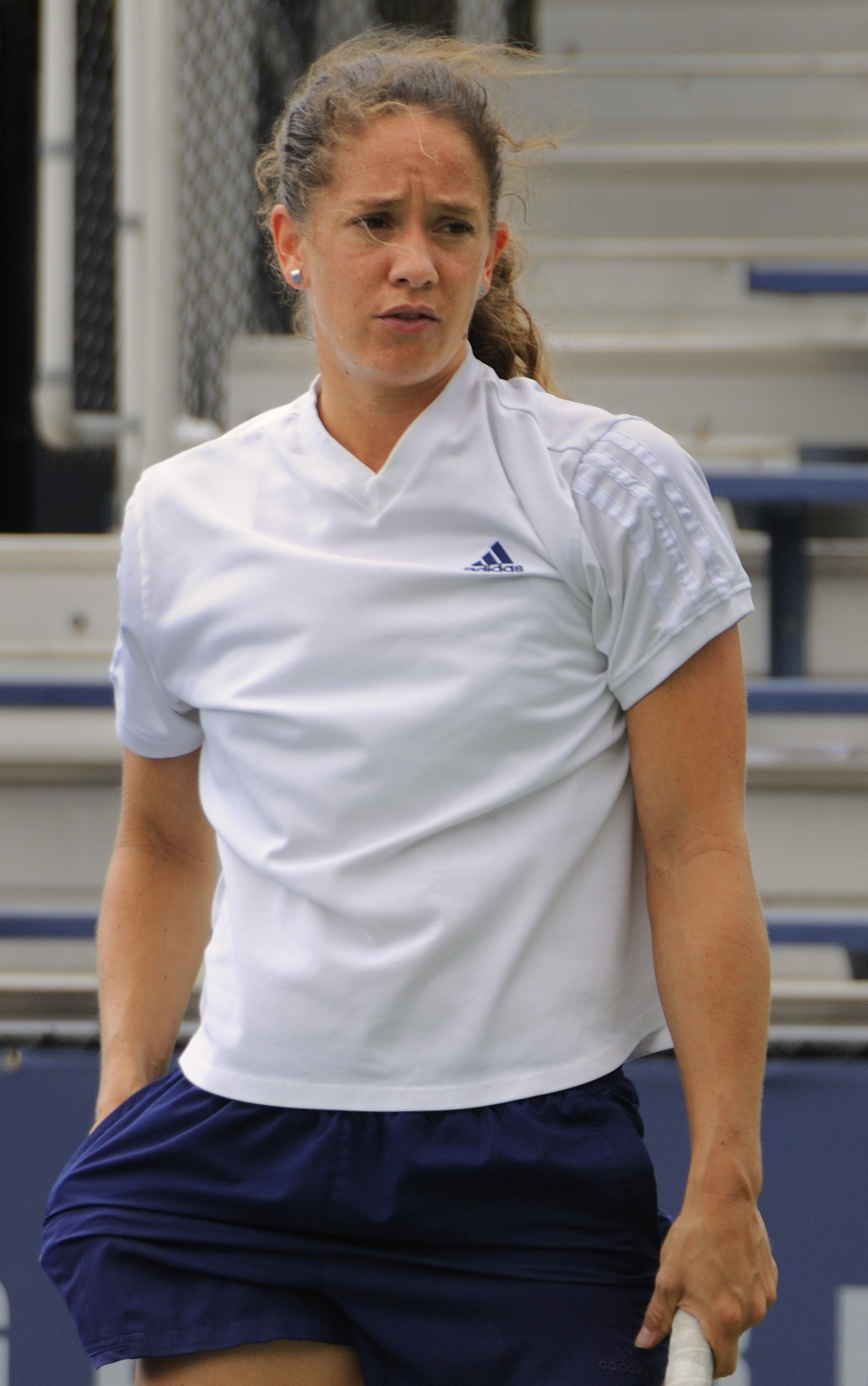
Patty Schnyder

On the day that marked the half-way point of the tournament, the men's third round matches were finished. Novak Djokovic, facing the number thirty seed and recent Pilot Pen Tennis champion Marin Čilić, was severely tested by the 19-year-old, but won through 6–7(7), 7–5, 6–4, 7–6(0) in four hours. Čilić continued to claw his way back into the match, as early breaks of serve by Djokovic in the final three sets were all nullified, and two match points were missed before he won. Roger Federer's win was in contrast to this, as he completed a comprehensive victory over number twenty-eight seed Radek Štěpánek, 6–3, 6–3, 6–2; and Andy Roddick also made easier passage to the fourth round, defeating number thirty Andreas Seppi 6–2, 7–5, 7–6(4). Both of these players were particularly successful on their serves. Nikolay Davydenko also put in a consummate performance to beat twenty-sixth seed Dmitry Tursunov, 6–2, 7–6, 6–3. Fifteenth seed Tommy Robredo knocked out the nineteenth seed and Australian Open finalist Jo-Wilfried Tsonga (who was playing his first tournament since having knee surgery in May); eleventh seed Fernando González defeated Jarkko Nieminen in four sets; and number twenty-three seed Igor Andreev defeated his higher-ranked opponent, number thirteen Fernando Verdasco, 6–2, 6–4, 6–4. Finally, qualifier Gilles Müller, who had not won three successive Tour level matches since July 2005 coming into the event, beat a second opponent after being two sets to love down (this time number eighteen Nicolás Almagro) in consecutive rounds, 6–7(3), 3–6, 7–6(5), 7–6,(6) 7–5.

Number two seed Jelena Janković faced a third successive match in which she struggled to reach the next round, but came through against teenager Caroline Wozniacki 3–6, 6–2, 6–1. Janković, who faced a similarly stern test versus Wozniacki at Wimbledon, was sluggish in the opening set, but proved dangerous on the rebound, as she took the next two losing only three games, and played in a more aggressive manner. Elena Dementieva cruised to victory against Li Na, and fifteenth seed Patty Schnyder beat Katarina Srebotnik to reach her second US Open quarterfinal, her first having come ten years earlier. Notably, the other fourth round match played, between twenty-ninth seed Sybille Bammer and number twelve Marion Bartoli, matched the longest women's singles match on record at the Open, clocking in at three hours and three minutes—with Bammer prevailing, 7–6(3), 0–6, 6–4. Bartoli called the trainer twice during the match, and said afterwards that she had been ailed by a stomach bug and low blood pressure.

- Seeded players out: Caroline Wozniacki, Marion Bartoli, Katarina Srebotnik; Dmitry Tursunov, Radek Štěpánek, Nicolás Almagro, Fernando Verdasco, Andreas Seppi, Jo-Wilfried Tsonga, Marin Čilić.
- Seeded players out: Martin Damm / Pavel Vízner; Alona Bondarenko / Kateryna Bondarenko

=== Day 8 ===
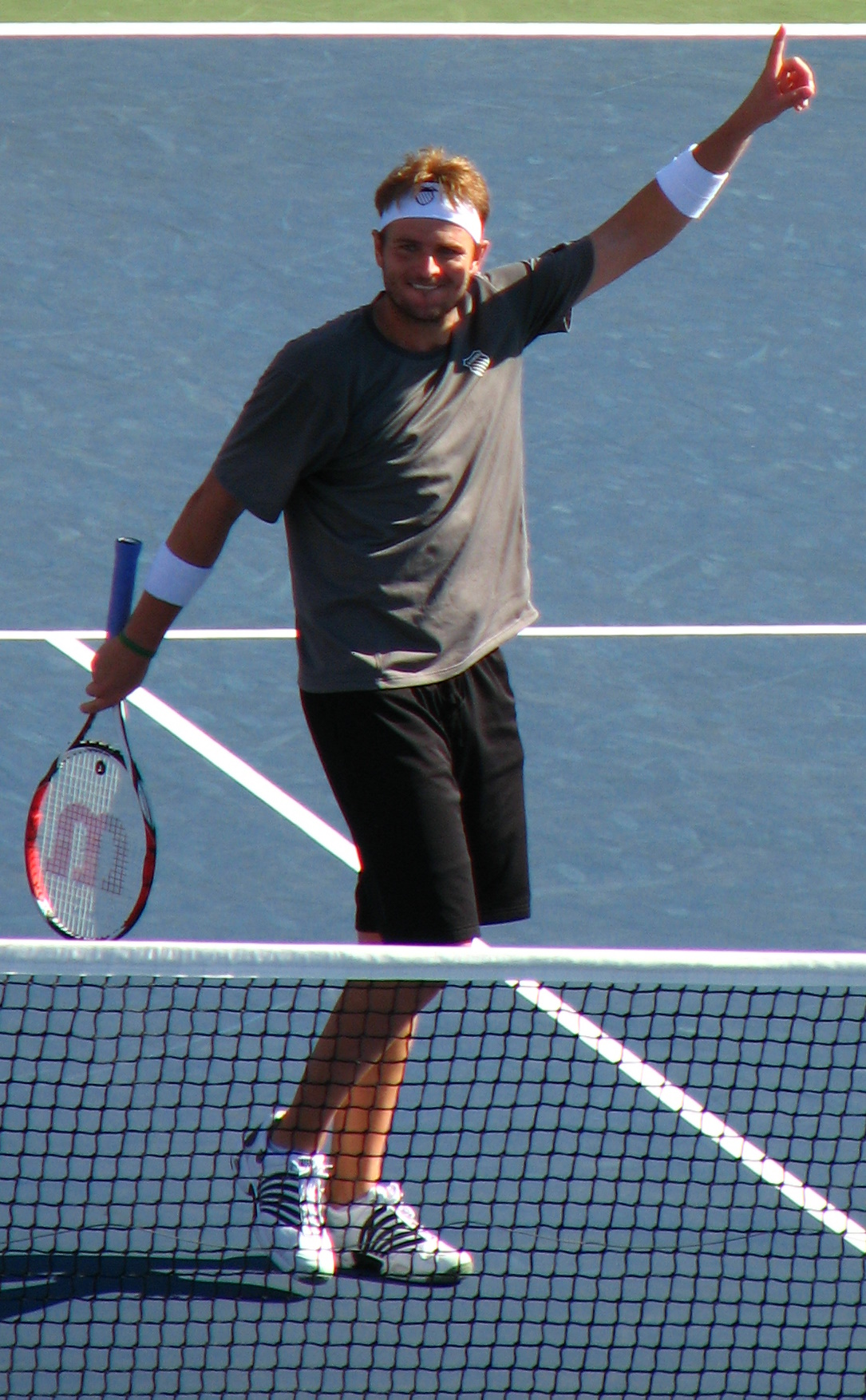
Mardy Fish

Rafael Nadal faced the first opponent, home favorite Sam Querrey, to cause him a palpable threat, as he came through 6–2, 5–7, 7–6(2), 6–3. Nadal struggled in the latter stages of the second set (which was the first one he dropped in the tournament), and up until the tiebreak of the third, putting in a subdued performance in which the quality of his serve wavered. An American who did progress to the quarterfinals was Mardy Fish, who beat number thirty-two seed Gaël Monfils 7–5, 6–2, 6–2. Fish played an attack-minded match, hitting 49 winners and regularly utilizing serve and volley tactics. Meanwhile, in the men's night match between number six seed Andy Murray and number ten Stanislas Wawrinka, Murray secured an accomplished win (6–1, 6–3, 6–3), in what BBC journalist Piers Newbery called "one of the best performances of his career". Murray set up a clash with Juan Martín del Potro, who defeated Kei Nishikori in straight sets, 6–3, 6–4, 6–3.

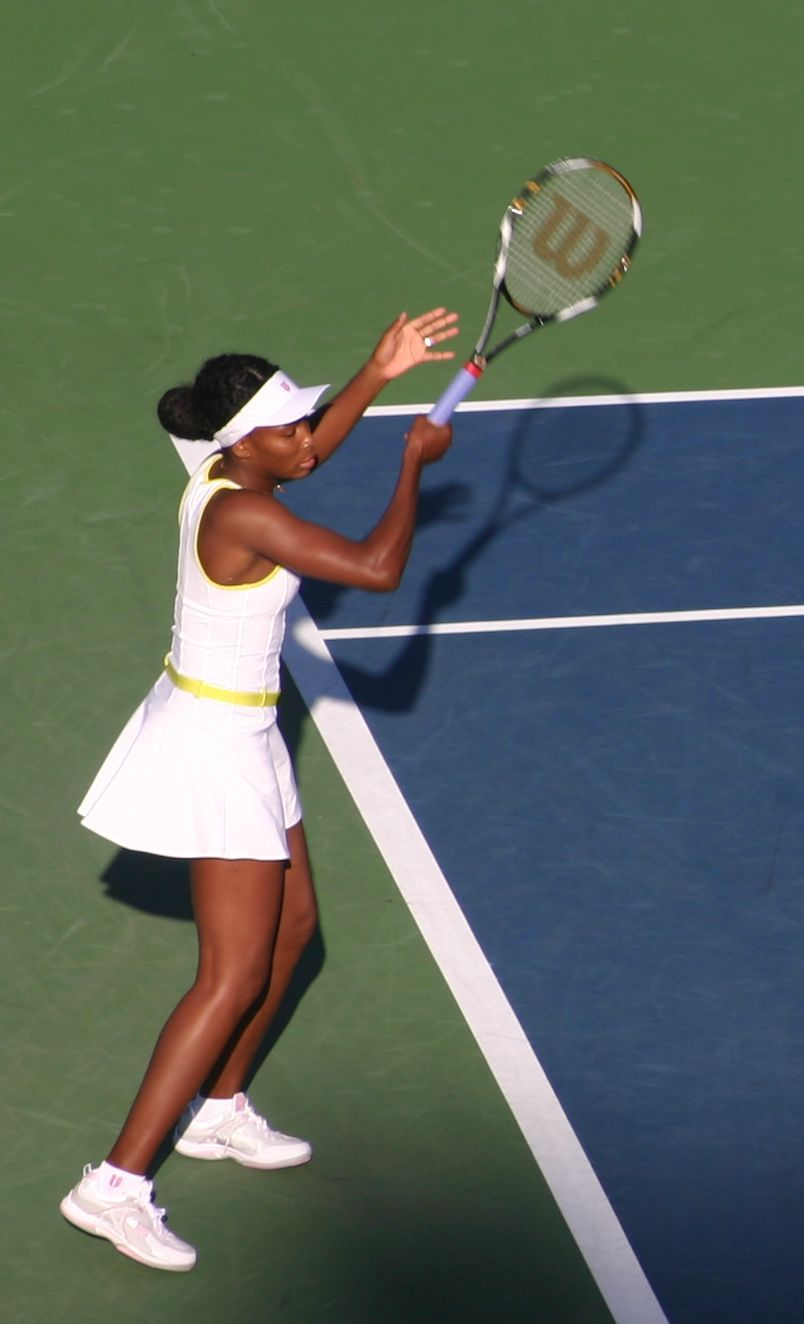
Venus Williams

In the women's singles, fourth seed Serena Williams continued to make serene progress, as she defeated Séverine Brémond 6–2, 6–2. Williams was highly successful on her first serve, with a conversion rate of 69%, and a points-won rate of 90%. Sister Venus, the number seven seed, set up a quarter-final clash with her, as she also completed an easy victory, over ninth seed Agnieszka Radwańska, 6–1, 6–3. Serena and Venus, who had recently played each other in the Wimbledon final (with Venus emerging the victor), expressed dismay at their seedings, which meant that they met at an earlier round than the final. The pair had previously faced each other in the Open final, with Venus winning in 2001 and Serena the following year. Also progressing was sixth seed Dinara Safina, who faced a difficult first set against Anna-Lena Grönefeld, 7–5, 6–0. Safina, who had encountered several difficult opponents before this round, revealed afterwards that she was in tears directly before the match, due to the physical exertion she had endured thus far. However, coach Zeljko Krajan had persuaded her to play, and she told reporters of her relief at having done so. Flavia Pennetta also navigated her way into the quarterfinals (the first time that she had reached this stage of a Grand Slam), defeating Amélie Mauresmo 6–3, 6–0. Mauresmo, a former world number one and two-time Grand Slam champion, played an error-strewn match, in which she served 14 double faults and hit 40 unforced errors.

- Seeded players out: Gaël Monfils, Stanislas Wawrinka; Amélie Mauresmo, Agnieszka Radwańska
- Seeded players out: Mahesh Bhupathi / Mark Knowles, Daniel Nestor / Nenad Zimonjić; Katarina Srebotnik / Nenad Zimonjić

=== Day 9 ===
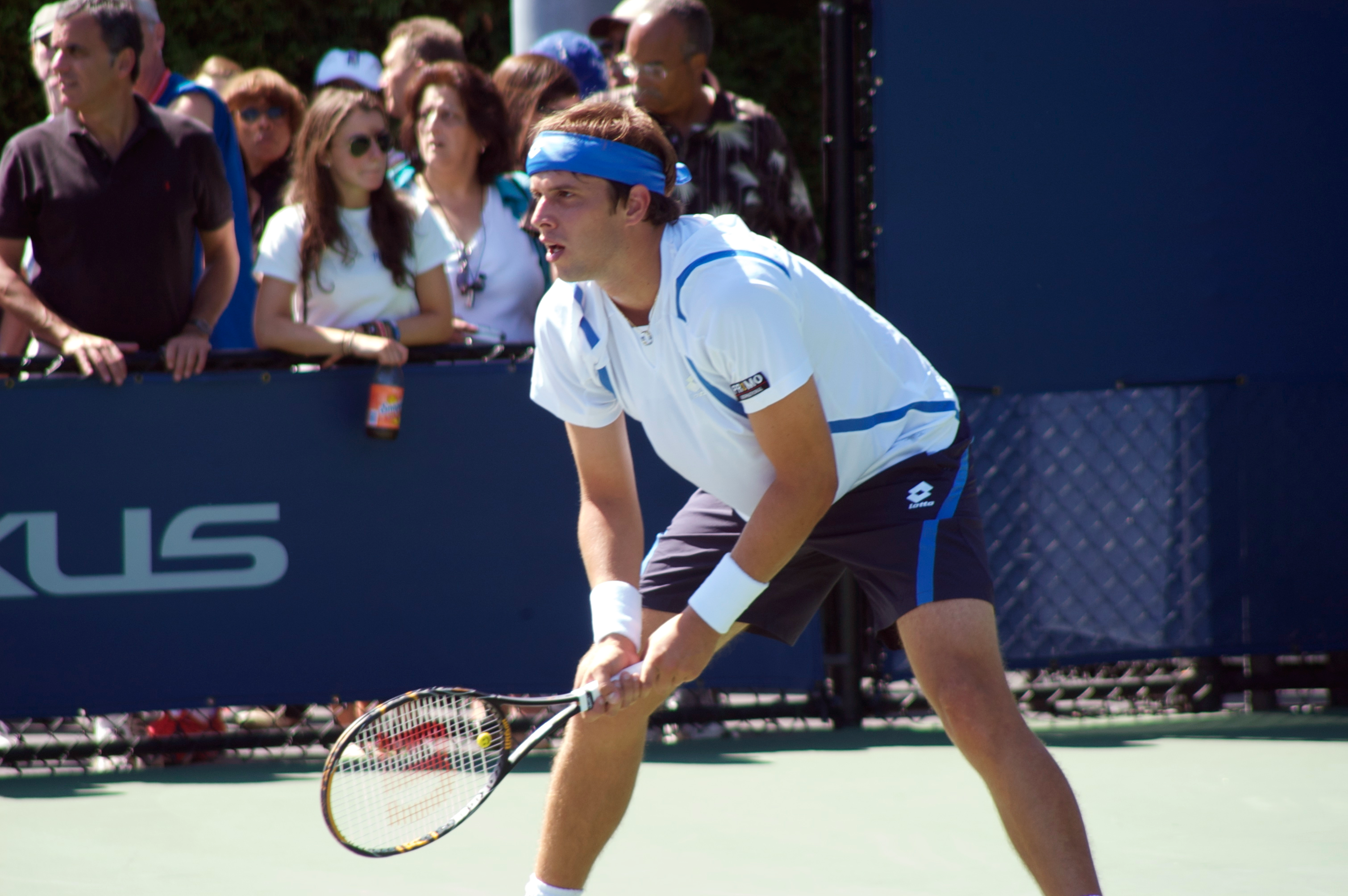
Gilles Müller

On Day 9, two of the top three seeds, and the two finalists from the previous year, Roger Federer and Novak Djokovic, were severely tested. Federer, aiming for his fifth consecutive Open title, was playing twenty-sixth seed Igor Andreev in one of the scheduled night matches on the Arthur Ashe Stadium; he was victorious in five sets, 6–7(5), 7–6(5), 6–3, 3–6, 6–3. Federer struggled to break Andreev's serve in the opening two sets, whereas Andreev broke Federer in the first game of the first, and had seven break points in the early games of the second (Andreev had a low success rate overall, only taking advantage of two out of fifteen break points in the whole match). In the final set Andreev, at 4–2 down, had five further break point opportunities, but failed to convert any as Federer served out the match. Djokovic was also pushed to five sets, defeating fifteenth seed Tommy Robredo 4–6, 6–2, 6–3, 5–7, 6–3 in nearly four hours. Robredo broke Djokovic's serve at 4–4 the first set, before Djokovic won sets two and three with some ease. However, after having broken serve in the fourth, Robredo leveled the match at 3–3, prompting the number three seed to smash his racket, and be the subject of booing from sections of the crowd. Djokovic failed to convert break points at 5–5, allowing Robredo to forge a break of his own and take it to a fifth set. Djokovic was able to close out the match after breaking at 2–2 in the final set. Djokovic was beset by problems related to both a hip injury (for which he required two time-outs) and exhaustion, having been unable to sleep until 4.30 am (UTC−5) on Day 8 after his match with Marin Čilić. Robredo responded by saying, "I think that if you're not fit enough, then don't play." Djokovic set up a tie with sixth seed Andy Roddick, who easily beat eleventh seed and Olympic silver medalist Fernando González 6–2, 6–4, 6–1; 2003 champion Roddick acknowledged that he would have to complete an upset to defeat Djokovic, despite Djokovic's admission that whomever he faced in the next round would be a fitter opponent. Gilles Müller continued his unexpected run, as he defeated fifth seed Nikolay Davydenko in a demanding match that finished 6–4, 4–6, 6–3, 7–6(10). Müller, who served twenty aces, became the lowest-ranked player, at world number 130, to reach the quarterfinals of the Open since Nicolas Escudé (rank 136) in 1999, and the lowest-ranked at a Grand Slam tournament since Alexander Popp (rank 198) at Wimbledon 2003. He was also the first Luxembourgian to reach the quarterfinal stage of a Grand Slam.

The latter stages of the women's tournament began, as the quarterfinal matches in the bottom half of the draw were played. Fifth seed and 2004 finalist Elena Dementieva progressed first, defeating the fifteenth seed Patty Schnyder with a competent display, 6–2, 6–3. Dementieva won the first set with two breaks, and although Schnyder broke back to level at 3–3 in the second, Dementieva won the next three games. Jelena Janković, a semifinalist in 2006, joined her, completing an easy 6–1, 6–4 win over twenty-ninth seed Sybille Bammer, who was playing in her first Grand Slam quarterfinal. Janković, whose match was relocated to the Louis Armstrong Stadium after the Federer-Andreev match overran, was one of four players, along with Dementieva, Serena Williams, and Dinara Safina who stood a chance of claiming the World No. 1 spot at the end of the tournament.

- Seeded players out: Tommy Robredo, Nikolay Davydenko, Igor Andreev, Fernando González; Patty Schnyder, Sybille Bammer

=== Day 10 ===
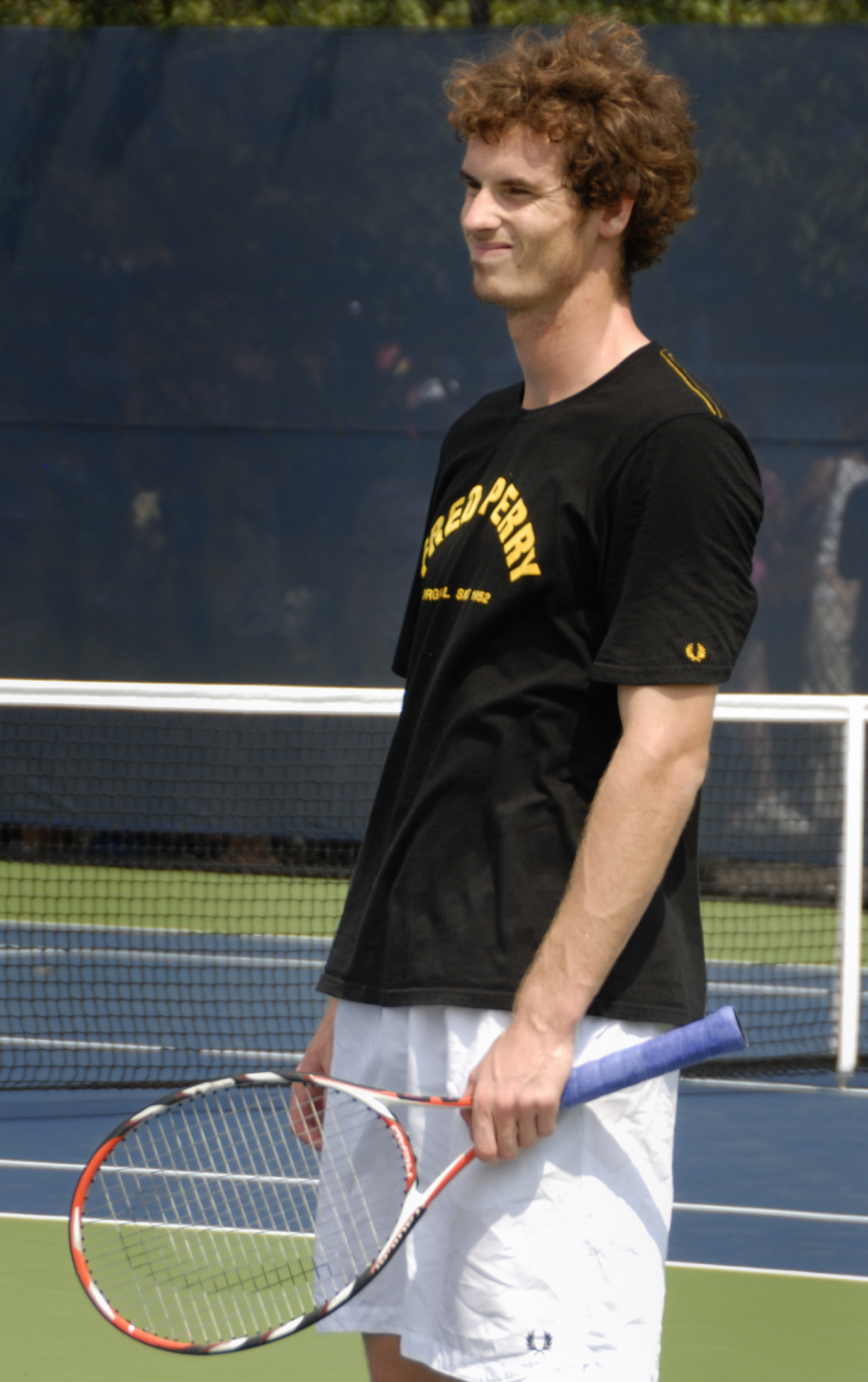
Andy Murray

The first two quarterfinal matches of the men's singles were played; top seed Rafael Nadal and sixth seed Andy Murray advanced to set up a match versus each other. Murray, who played first, defeated seventeenth seed Juan Martín del Potro, and ended del Potro's 23-match winning streak in the process. Murray endeavored to victory in nearly four hours, with the final scoreline at 7–6(2) 7–6(1), 4–6, 7–5. There was a history of antagonism between the pair, despite having only played once before, at the 2008 Rome Masters; in this match, del Potro had allegedly hit a ball straight at Murray, and not apologized, and later insulted Murray's mother. In the first set, Murray raced ahead, and led 4–1 before del Potro went on to win the next four games. Murray then broke back, and dominated the tiebreak that took place shortly afterwards. In the second set, it was Murray who broke late in the set, at 5–5, and he had an opportunity to serve for the set. Although del Potro broke back, Murray again eased through the tiebreak. Murray accelerated to a 3–1 lead in the third set, but del Potro fought back, and won the set, affording Murray only one more game. The players exchanged two breaks of serve in the final set, before Murray gained a decisive break at 6–5 to reach his first Grand Slam semifinal. Murray said the history of ill feeling between the pair did not transfer itself to the court, and that del Potro had apologized as the players shook hands at the end. The nineteen-year-old del Potro, who was playing in his first Grand Slam quarterfinal, hailed Murray as one of "best players in the world" in his press conference; however, he was unable to finish the round of questioning, and left midway through in tears. In the match between Nadal and the unseeded American Mardy Fish, Fish continued to play the attacking brand of tennis that he had done in the previous round, and, in front of a partisan home crowd, won the first set 6–3. However, Nadal improved his performance in the following three sets, and produced a number of passing shots to counter Fish's aggressive play, eventually coming through 3–6, 6–1, 6–4, 6–2. Due in part to the longevity of the Williams-Williams match, the players remained on court until after 2.11 am, meaning that the match was sixteen minutes shy of the latest match ever played at the Open.

The late women's match was between the Williams sisters, Venus and Serena, both of whom had won the Open title twice previously. Serena prevailed in two sets, 7–6(6), 7–6(7), but not without considerable difficulty. Venus took the initiative in the opening stages, breaking to lead 3–1, and had the advantage of serving for two sets points at 5–3, 40–15. However, Serena launched a comeback, and won the first set on a tiebreak score of 8–6. In a second set that mirrored the first in many ways, Venus broke at 3–2 up, and again served for the set at 5–3; Venus used an array of attacking shots, regularly approaching the net and playing a number of cross-court forehands. Venus then led Serena for a large portion of the second set tiebreak, but squandered eight sets points; Serena, meanwhile, won on her first match point to secure the tiebreak 9–7. Serena commented afterwards that the siblings were "definitely playing the best [tennis of the tournament] so far." Sixth seed Dinara Safina filled the other semifinal spot, defeating sixteenth seed Flavia Pennetta 6–2, 6–3. Safina, who had reached the final stage of six of her previous seven tournaments, said that she hoped to emulate her brother Marat, who won his maiden Grand Slam tournament at Flushing Meadows in 2000.

- Seeded players out: Juan Martín del Potro; Flavia Pennetta, Venus Williams
- Seeded players out: Yan Zi / Zheng Jie

=== Day 11 ===
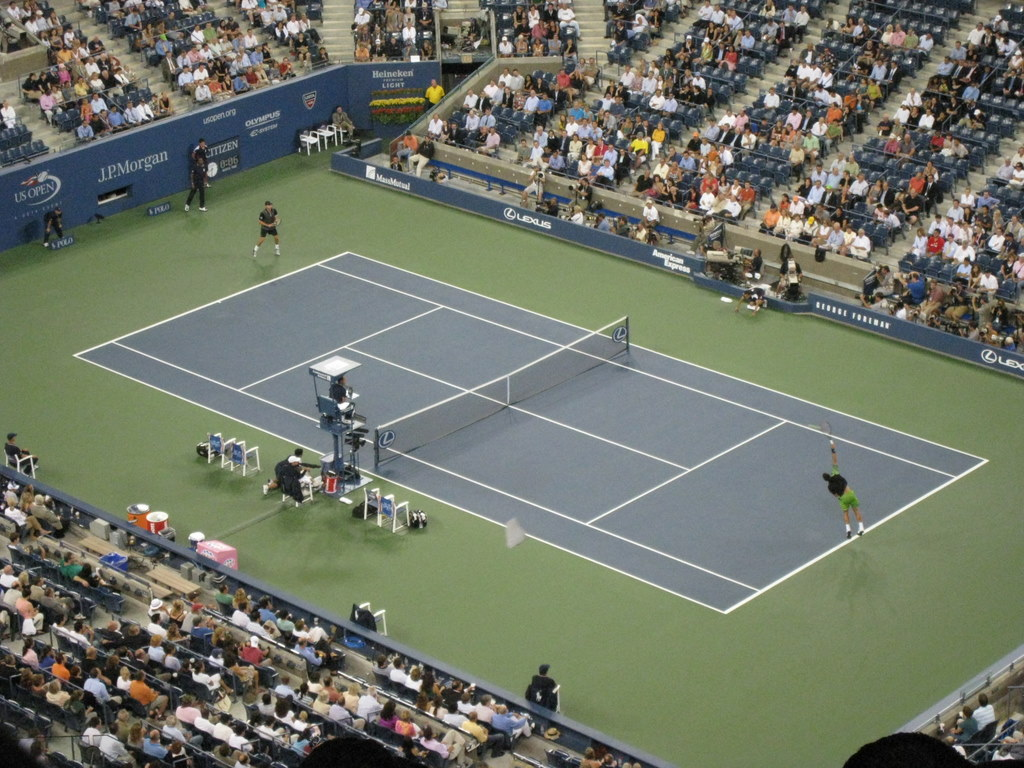
Roddick vs. Djokovic match in progress

Day 11 featured a men's quarterfinal, between Novak Djokovic and Andy Roddick, that, like the match between Murray and del Potro, was preceded, and in this case, followed, by a controversial incident somewhat extraneous to the match played. Roddick said, in a press conference held on Day 10, that Djokovic was "either quick to call a trainer or the most courageous guy of all time", insinuating that his opponent had a reputation for being injured (as he had been in his previous match) and, somewhat tongue-in-cheek, listed a series of esoteric conditions that Djokovic may have been afflicted with ("Back and a hip? And a cramp? Bird flu? Anthrax? SARS? Common cough and cold?"). The American, renowned for his serve, struggled with this aspect of his game in the early stages of the match, and Djokovic broke three times in the first set, winning in 27 minutes; he then took the second, needing only one break of serve in that set. However, Roddick, who had the support of the home crowd to his advantage, broke to lead 3–1 in the third, and he eventually won the set. In the fourth set, Roddick appeared to have gained momentum after breaking Djokovic's serve to lead 4–3. Roddick was playing with increased exuberance at this point, and the crowd became more vocal, even making noise during Djokovic's service motions. Roddick's serve failed him again though when, at 5–4, 30–0 up, he doubled-faulted twice and allowed Djokovic to break back; the number-three seed then went on to win the tie-break and seal the win 6–2, 6–3, 3–6, 7–6(5). Djokovic then vented his anger at Roddick's comments in a post-match, court-side interview, beginning by stating, sarcastically, "Andy was saying that I have 16 injuries in the last match; obviously I don't, right?" The crowd then began to boo Djokovic, to which he said, "Like it or not, it's like that." The interviewer, wanting to defuse the situation, told Djokovic that, "This crowd loves you, but you could turn them against you real fast"; Djokovic responded by saying "I know [the crowd] are already against me because they think I am faking everything." In a later interview, Roddick criticized Djokovic for being able to mock other players with his impressions, but being unable to receive mockery of himself in a gracious manner; Djokovic showed contrition, calling it a "mistake" and apologizing to Roddick. Djokovic had set up a match with the player he lost to in the 2007 final, Roger Federer, who had earlier beaten qualifier Gilles Müller 7–6(5), 6–4, 7–6(5). The former World No. 1 produced a measured performance, attacking Müller in the latter stages of the three sets. Müller fended off five set points in the first, before being broken in the tiebreak at 4–4. Federer broke serve at 4–4 (games) in the second set, and then served that set out; Müller put up stronger resistance in the third set tiebreak, leading 4–1 and 5–3, but after this allowed Federer to win the next four points. With this victory, Federer maintained his sequence of consecutive Grand Slam semifinals, with this being the eighteenth time he had done so.

- Seeded players out: Andy Roddick
- Seeded players out: Katarina Srebotnik / Ai Sugiyama

=== Day 12 ===
On women's semifinal day it was the two former World No. 1s, Jelena Janković and Serena Williams, who came through in blustery conditions. For Janković, it was the first time she had reached the final of a Grand Slam, having made the semi-finals on four previous occasions. She was also the third Serb to reach a Grand Slam final in 2008 (men's and women's singles), making them the most successful nation in this regard. She progressed first, defeating Elena Dementieva 6–4, 6–4. Dementieva was in the ascendency in the early part of the match, as she broke serve to lead 4–2 and dictated the play from the baseline. However, Dementieva began to hit more unforced errors at this point, and Janković took advantage of this, winning the next four games to secure the first set. On set point, which was on Dementieva's serve, Janković caused a minor controversy when she asked the ball boy for a towel, thus exceeding the 25 second time limit between points; she received a code violation (warning) from the umpire as a result of this incident. Both players struggled to hold serve in the early stages of the second set, and they traded two breaks apiece from 1–1 to 3–3. Both players then held serve to 4–4, before Janković broke at 5–4 to win the match. Dementieva had problems throughout the match; she was broken on serve five times, and committed forty-two unforced errors in total. However, she said that her recent Olympic triumph provided more than mere consolation, as she assigned a higher worth to the Olympic tennis event. Janković, who was in tears at the end of the match, had suffered a spate of injuries in 2008, and claimed that this was the first tournament of the year that she was injury free. Williams also won in two sets, defeating Dinara Safina 6–3, 6–2. Safina broke Williams in the first game of the match, but Williams soon asserted herself, and after having broken back, broke again to lead 5–3. Although Williams faced break points in this game, she eventually came through to win the first set. Safina, who was troubled by the wind for the whole match, was then broken after being 40–0 up in the first game of the second set. Williams eased to a 5–1 lead before closing out the match with a big serve. Williams told afterwards of her excitement of having an American player back in the final (the last women's singles final to feature an American woman was 2002, when, as previously mentioned, she and her sister played each other). Safina meanwhile, chastised her own behavior on the court, saying that she acted like a "spoilt girl" and would in the future try to contain her emotions.

- Seeded players out: Elena Dementieva, Dinara Safina.
- Seeded players out: Lukáš Dlouhý / Leander Paes

=== Day 13 ===
Fears had been raised on the days leading up to Day 13 that this would be the date on which the north-east coast of the US would be affected by the remnants of Hurricane Hanna, and they proved to be correct. A substantial part of "Super Saturday", as it often known (because the men's semifinals and women's final are played on the same day, something unique among the Grand Slam events), was called off due to rain. The United States Tennis Association's original contingency plan was to start the men's semifinals at the earlier time of 11 am (UTC−5), an hour earlier than tradition dictates. If the men's matches were completed, but the women's final could not be, then both finals would be played on Day 14, the final Sunday. Were none of the matches to be completed, Day 13's schedule would be forwarded by one day, and an extra day would be allocated for the men's final. Minor rescheduling took place on the day; for example, the match between Rafael Nadal and Andy Murray began at a later start time than the Roger Federer–Novak Djokovic match, 12:40 pm (it was relocated from the Arthur Ashe to Louis Armstrong Stadium), to allow people to see part of both matches. This created logistical problems for the organizers, as many fans left the semifinal between Federer and Djokovic to get good seats at the other. Ultimately, with one men's match finished, and another half-way completed, the organizers decided to designate a fifteenth day's play, with the women's final having been cancelled due to ongoing rain. The final decision was that on Day 14, the conclusion of the men's semifinal between Nadal and Murray and the women's final would be played in separate sessions, and the men's final would be played on the following day. This was the first time since the 1974 Open, when Billie Jean King beat Evonne Goolagong, that the women's final was not played on the Saturday, and the first time since 1987 that an extra day was required.

In the one men's semifinal that was completed, Federer, who had endured a poor season by his standards, defeated Djokovic 6–3, 5–7, 7–5, 6–2 to reach his third Grand Slam final of the year, and seventeenth overall. The last time the pair had met on hardcourts was in January, in the Australian Open semifinal, where Djokovic had convincingly beaten Federer; the time before this was in the aforementioned 2007 final, where Federer had won in straight sets. Both players made impressive starts to their encounter on this occasion, as they secured easy holds of serve the opening two games. However, in third game, Federer broke, and did not lose another service game in the first set. In the second set, it was Djokovic who gained the early break, and he led 3–1 before Federer rallied back to draw level at 4–4. However, this proved to be in vain as Federer, who had already saved two set points from 0–40 down, was broken at 5–6 to hand Djokovic the second set. The score was deadlocked at 5–5 in the third when Federer fashioned a crucial break of serve, and went on to win the set. During the match, Djokovic had felt the wrath of the US crowd, who were vociferous in their support for Federer, and who at times cheered when he hit unforced errors. After being broken at 5–5, Djokovic turned and gave them a mock gesture of thanks, which only incited them further. Federer added afterwards that he felt he had broken Djokovic's will by winning this set. Federer broke again in the fifth game of the fourth set, and did not lose another game as he cruised to victory. The other men's semifinal, between Nadal and Murray, was suspended with the score at 6–2, 7–6(5), 2–3 in Murray's favor (although he was a break down in the third). Murray began the match in an aggressive manner, serving and volleying, and hitting several winners from the back of the court. He was rewarded with two breaks of serve in the first set, at 1–1 and 4–2. Murray continued to bother Nadal on serve in the second, but could not break, despite holding seven break points, and facing none against himself. In the tie-break, he squandered an early lead before reeling off three points in a row at 4–5 down to gain a two-set advantage. Nadal broke Murray early in the second set, before a short postponement in play was initiated when a light rain appeared, in order to give the referee time to assess whether the court was still suitable for play. Murray queried the initial decision to stop play, but the rain soon came on stronger, and the match was suspended overnight.

- Seeded players out: Novak Djokovic

=== Day 14 ===
The first session of play on Day 14 saw Murray round off his victory against Nadal, 6–2, 7–6(5) 4–6, 6–4. Play resumed on Arthur Ashe Stadium, and Nadal won all three of his service games, fending off one break point from Murray in the process, to win the third set. Both players then had opportunities to break at the start of the fourth. Nadal had one in the first game, and Murray had seven in the second; this second game spanned a total of twenty-two points, and took 15 minutes to be concluded. The resolute Nadal held out though, and broke Murray to love in the next game. Murray came back into the match, leveling the scores at 3–3; and he broke again to win the match at 5–4. After a somewhat fortuitous net cord at deuce of that game, Murray hit a backhand pass at match point to confirm the win. Murray, who came into the match having failed to beat Nadal in five previous encounters, became the first Briton, male or female, since Greg Rusedski at the 1997 Open to reach the final of a Grand Slam singles tournament. Nadal, who was also playing in his first US Open semifinal, said that, with the number of matches he had played recently taken into consideration, he was pleased with his overall performance at the Open. Had the match gone to seeding, Nadal would have been facing his rival, Federer, for a third time in a Grand Slam final in 2008, after having already beaten him at the French Open and Wimbledon.

The women's singles final was also played, and Williams was victorious over Janković in two sets, 6–4, 7–5. Williams also reclaimed the number one berth for the first time since 2003, something that Janković would have done had she won the title. The players came into the final with a win–loss record against each other of 3-3, although Janković said beforehand that, "Overall, she's, I think, the strongest player on the tour, together with her sister." The match was preceded by an opening ceremony that included Anita Baker singing the US national anthem, a group of people moving a gigantic American flag over the court, and a coin toss performed by Billie Jean King. The match, which the BBC called "one of the more memorable US Open finals", began in exciting fashion, with Serena being edged to deuce in the first game, as both players hit a number of winners and unforced errors in the opening stages. Janković appeared to be playing with greater confidence though, when she broke to love in the third game of the match. Any advantage that this break gave her was nullified in the next game, as Williams broke back from 40–0 down. Janković was broken again to go 4–2 down, but it was her turn to break back as Williams made several errors when serving for the set at 5–3. Her work was undone when she went 0–40 down in the subsequent game, and after saving one set point, ceded the first set to Williams on the following one.

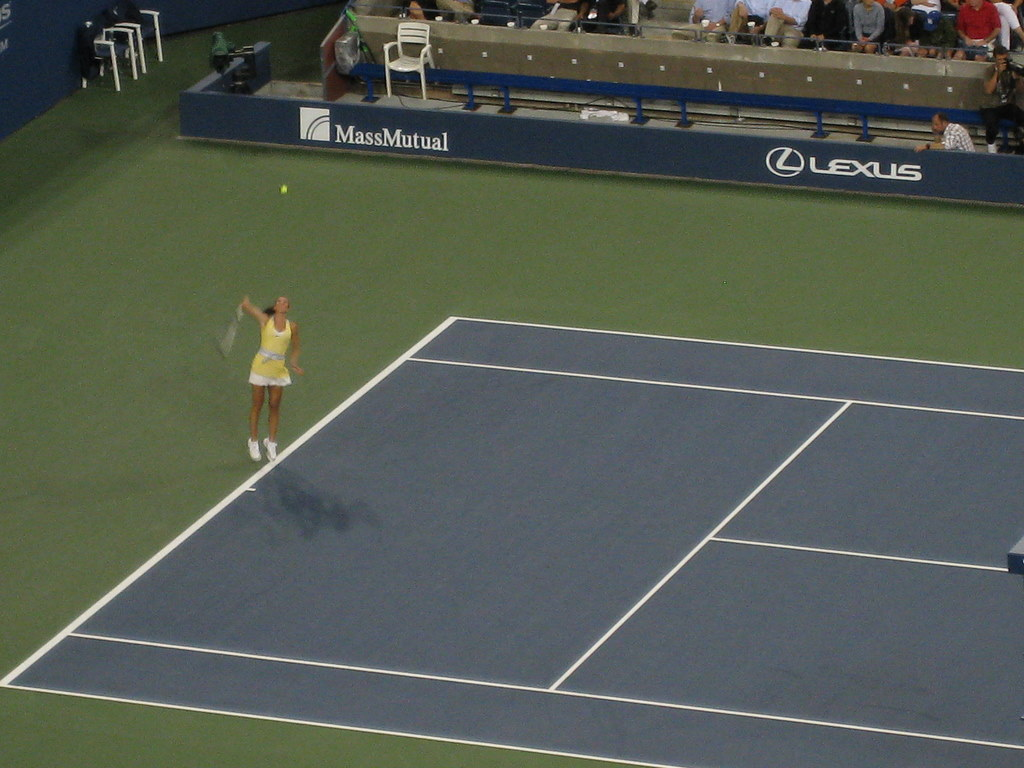
Jelena Janković serving

Williams began the second set ominously for Janković, as she held to love and then forced two break points on her serve. The next four games saw the players contest several exhausting rallies, but Williams was the only one to force any break points, gaining a lead of 15–40 at 2–1 and 3–2, with Janković holding both times. Before the seventh game of the third set, Williams went to use her towel, and Janković complained to the umpire about the violation; the same one she had committed in the previous round. With the score at 40–30 in Williams's favor, Janković hit a winner, and although the decision of the line judge incensed Williams, it was shown to be clearly in on the Hawk-Eye review; Janković then won the game, and her next one when back on serve. She had her first three set points in the next game, racing to a 0–40 lead, but failed to convert any as Williams held on. With Janković serving for the set (5–4), Williams hit three winners to take a 0–40 lead, the final point in this sequence being her eighth in a row. Janković won the next three points, and after Williams twice held advantage, she hit an ace to bring up her fourth set point. However, Janković double-faulted on this opportunity, and allowed Williams to win the game on her sixth break point. Williams won the next two games, and although Janković had a game point at 6–5, she double-faulted, and Williams took the match on her second championship point.

This was the ninth Grand Slam tournament that Williams had won, and she did not drop a set on her way to doing so. At the time, Williams joined an elite group of six women who had won nine or more Grand Slam titles in the open era, equaling Monica Seles's tally with this triumph. Williams, who had dominated the sport from 2002 to 2003, but been ranked outside the top 125 in 2006, put her renaissance, not only in this tournament but for the whole of 2008, down to a better approach towards fitness. Williams had won her first Grand Slam at the Open, in 1999, and reflected on her future by saying that she wanted to win several more before her career was over. Janković meanwhile, said she was contented with her first outing in a Grand Slam final, and joked that she probably deserved an Oscar for the dramatic nature of her matches in the two weeks that led up to the final.

- Seeded players out: Rafael Nadal; Jelena Janković
- Seeded players out: Lisa Raymond / Samantha Stosur

=== Day 15 ===
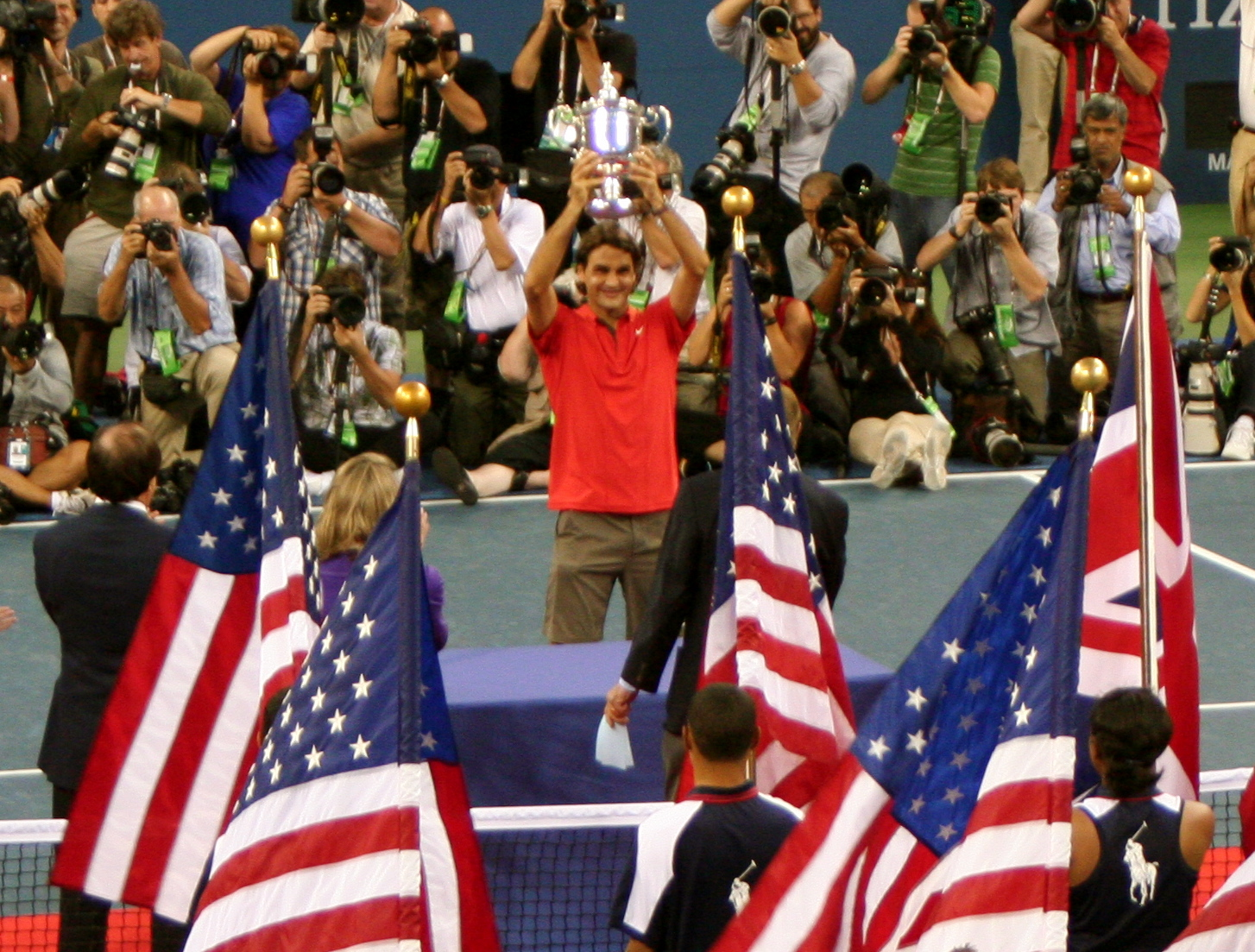
Roger Federer holding the US Open trophy

Roger Federer defeated Andy Murray in straight sets 6–2, 7–5, 6–2, to claim his fifth consecutive title, thus cementing his place in history as the first man since Bill Tilden in 1924 to have achieved this feat. The only other men to have done so were Richard Sears, in 1887, and Bill Larned, in 1911 (Jimmy Connors and Pete Sampras had each won five times, but not consecutively). Federer created a new record, becoming the first man to have won two different Grand Slam events five consecutive times (the other being Wimbledon), and this win left him one short of Pete Sampras's all-time men's record of 14 Grand Slam singles wins. In the context of Federer's career, this was the sixth straight year in which he had won a Grand Slam. Murray also came into the match aiming to break a pre-open-era record, his being one of national importance—the last British man to have won a Grand Slam singles title was Fred Perry at the 1936 U.S. National Championships, the last British woman to have done so was Virginia Wade at Wimbledon 1977.

Coming into this tournament, both players had contrasting records at Grand Slams: the twenty-seven-year-old Federer had reached sixteen Grand Slam finals, and won twelve, whereas the 21-year-old Murray had yet to reach the final of one. Murray also had the task of becoming the first man since Sergi Bruguera, at the 1993 French Open, to beat the top two players in the world at a Grand Slam. He did however, hold a win–loss record of 2–1 against Federer, and had most recently beaten him at the 2008 Dubai Tennis Championships. Murray, who expressed confidence coming into the final, said that this small positive record stood for little, and he, along with a number of commentators, including former Wimbledon champions Pat Cash and Michael Stich, acknowledged Federer to be the favorite, despite his disappointing year.

The match, dubbed by American sports promoter Don King as the "Grapple in the Apple", began at 5:00 pm (UTC−5). The pair easily held the opening three games, before Federer launched his first assault on Murray's serve at 2–1 up; he could not, however, convert his one break point opportunity. Federer eased through next service game, and broke Murray for the first time at 3–2 following a succession of errors from Murray. Federer fired another series of big serves in the seventh game, and then broke Murray to win the first set, 6–2, in twenty-seven minutes. Murray lost the first two games of the second set, meaning that Federer had won a cumulative total of six games in a row. Murray immediately broke back though, and appeared to have steadied himself by winning the next game, allowing Federer only one point. Federer failed to hit any successful first serves in the next game, and Murray gained three consecutive break points at 0–40. Federer won the next three points, despite, on evidence of a replay, having clearly hit one of his shots long. Because Murray did not stop the point, he could not challenge the call; after the match, when Murray was asked about this, he said he was disappointed, but thought that the rules were correct in not allowing retrospective challenges. Both players comfortably held the next four games, although some minor threats presented themselves for Federer at 4–4, 0–15 and 30–30 (Murray hit backhands long both times). Murray was aided in the next game, when he was serving to stay in the set, as Federer hit four unforced errors, all going long. Federer won the next game, and then seized his final opportunity on a Murray service game, winning the final game of the second set to love.

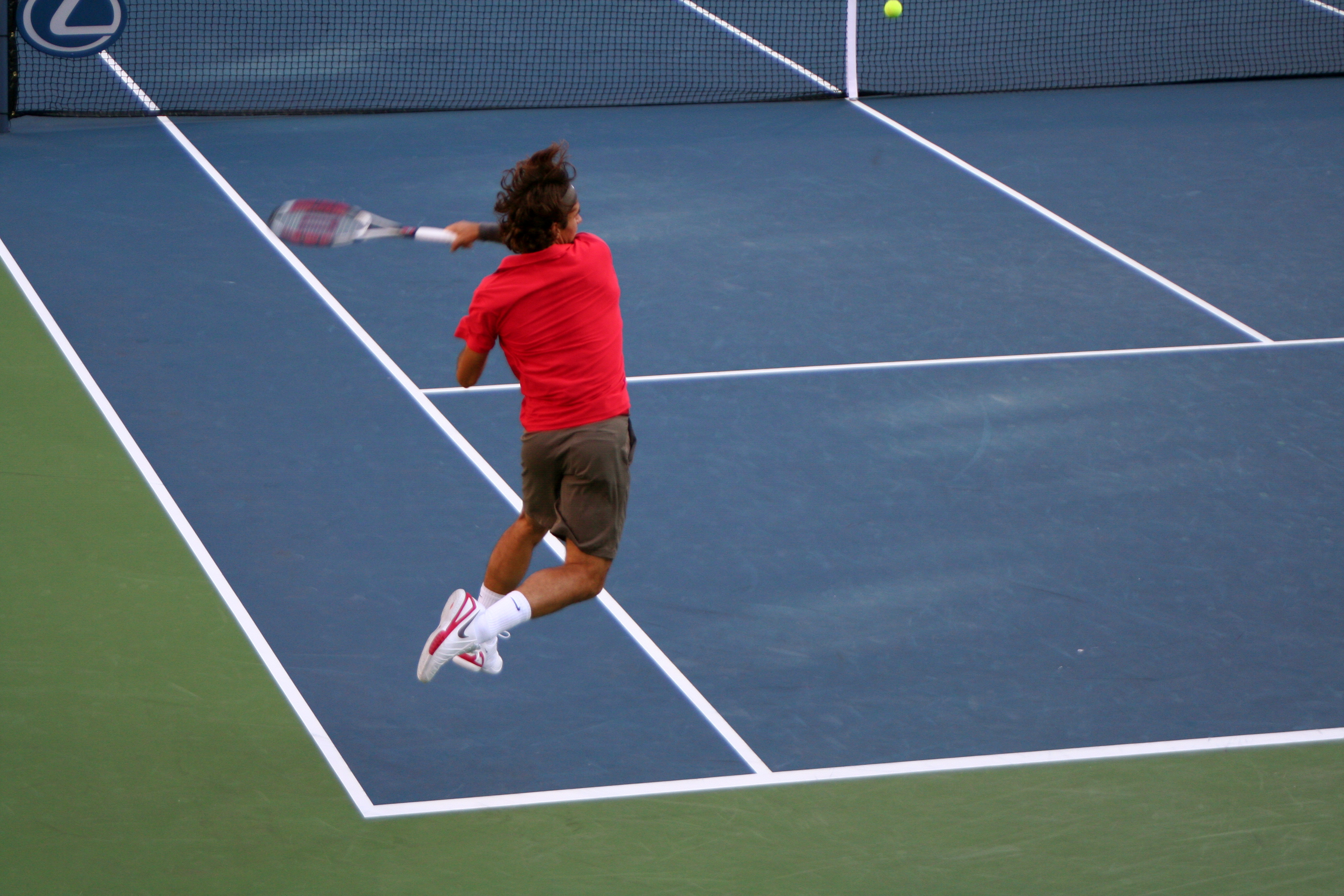
Federer hitting a forehand

Federer began to overpower his opponent in the third set; Murray was broken to love twice as Federer raced ahead to a 5–0 lead, with Murray winning only four points up to that point. He did, however, win the next two games. Federer broke the game after though, winning on his second championship point in a point that required three smashes from the defending champion. The match lasted one hour and fifty-one minutes, thirteen minutes fewer than it took to complete the women's final. The only players that Federer had not surpassed, in terms of US Open wins, at this point in his career were: Richard Sears, who had won seven straight, Bill Larned, who won seven overall, and Bill Tilden with six straight and seven overall (all three of these players played before the open era). In the last on-court televised interview, Federer was adamant that he would not stop at thirteen, describing such a scenario as "terrible". Federer, who at the time had a total win–loss record of 45–4 at the Open and 34-match winning streak, said that the streak was of great importance to him, especially after having lost at Wimbledon. Reflecting on his year, he said, "I had a couple of tough Grand Slams this year. To take this one home is incredible." Murray said of the competition with Federer in tournaments that "I got the better of him the past two times, but he definitely set the record straight", and said, on his future, "I know mentally now that I can get to a Slam final, and physically. The only thing it comes down to is the tennis." Paying tribute to Federer, he said that, "I came up against, in my opinion, the best player ever to play the game."

- Seeded players out: Andy Murray

== Summaries of other events ==
=== Seniors doubles ===
==== Men's ====
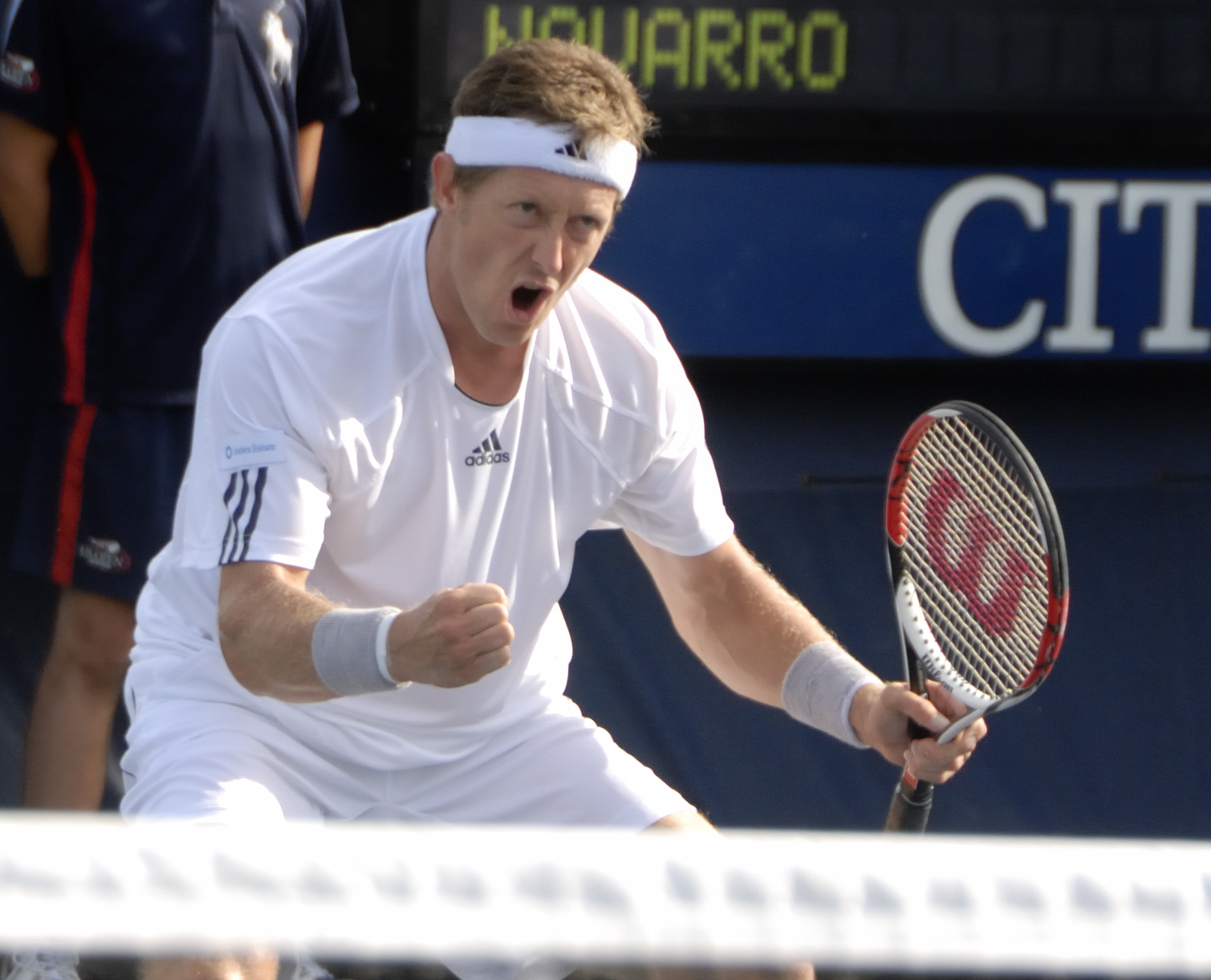
Jonas Björkman, a former doubles champion at the Open, was knocked out in the second round (partnering Kevin Ullyett). It was his final Grand Slam before he retired.

In the men's doubles, American twins Bob and Mike Bryan won the sixth Grand Slam title of their careers, and their second at the US Open, having last won in 2005. They beat the pairing of Lukáš Dlouhý and Leander Paes, 7–6(5), 7–6(10). Dlouhy and Paes, who were the number seven seeds, were playing in only their sixth tournament as a team. Of the sixteen seeds, the Bryans and the Dlouhy-Paes combination were the only ones to make it as far as the quarterfinal stage. In the final itself, the Bryans had to come back from being a break down in the first set, before winning it in the tiebreak. In the second set, the teams traded breaks, before the Bryans came through a longer tiebreak. The pair came into the event having won the bronze medal at the Olympics, and they did not drop a set on their way to winning the tournament. This win allowed them to recover their number one spot in the rankings, dethroning Daniel Nestor, who had lost in the third round partnering Nenad Zimonjić. After the match, the 30-year-old brothers played down their chances of catching The Woodies, who won 11 Grand Slam titles in their career.

==== Women's ====
Cara Black and Liezel Huber won the women's doubles, which was their fourth Grand Slam title together (Black's fifth overall), the first US Open win for either, and Huber's first as a US citizen (she was born in, and had previously represented, South Africa). Black and Huber were top seeds, but had last won a Grand Slam at Wimbledon 2007. In the final, they beat the tenth seeded team of Lisa Raymond and Samantha Stosur, both of whom were former World No. 1s and Grand Slam champions, 6–3, 7–6(6). Black and Huber had been down two set points in the second set tiebreak, at 6–4, but went on to win the next four points to ensure that, like the Bryans, they did not lose a set in any of their matches. Black and Huber had faced each other three days earlier in the mixed doubles final. Speaking of this match, Black said that it was "one of the toughest matches I've ever played" and that, because of this, "I really wanted to win it for her."

==== Mixed ====
In the mixed doubles, Black and Paes, seeded fifth, teamed up to defeat the unseeded partnership of Huber and Jamie Murray (brother of Andy), 7–6(6), 6–4. It was Paes's fourth mixed doubles title, Black's third, and their first together. Huber and Murray dominated the opening stages of the first set tiebreak, leading 5–2 and 6–4, before Black and Paes came back to take the set. Despite some pressure on Paes's serve in the early stages of the second set, Murray was broken early on, and Black and Paes took the title.

=== Juniors ===
Due to the rain on Saturday, the boys' and girls' singles semi-finals were moved to an indoor tennis centre at Port Chester, New York.

==== Boys' ====
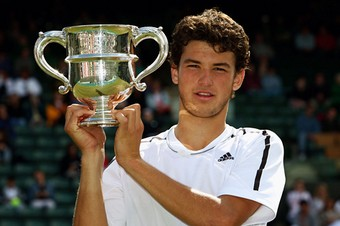
Grigor Dimitrov, seen here holding the Wimbledon boys' title that he won earlier in the year.

The boys' singles final saw reigning Wimbledon champion Grigor Dimitrov pitted against home favorite Devin Britton, a qualifier who had knocked out several seeds, including number two and reigning Australian Open champion Bernard Tomic, on his way to the final. Dimitrov, playing in his final junior tournament, defeated Britton 6–4, 6–3. Three American boys made the semifinals, making this the most successful tournament for the home nation since 2000, when Andy Roddick, Ytai Abougzir, and Robby Ginepri all reached that stage. Britton was surprised at his breakthrough, saying that he was "happy to be in the main draw" at the beginning of the event.

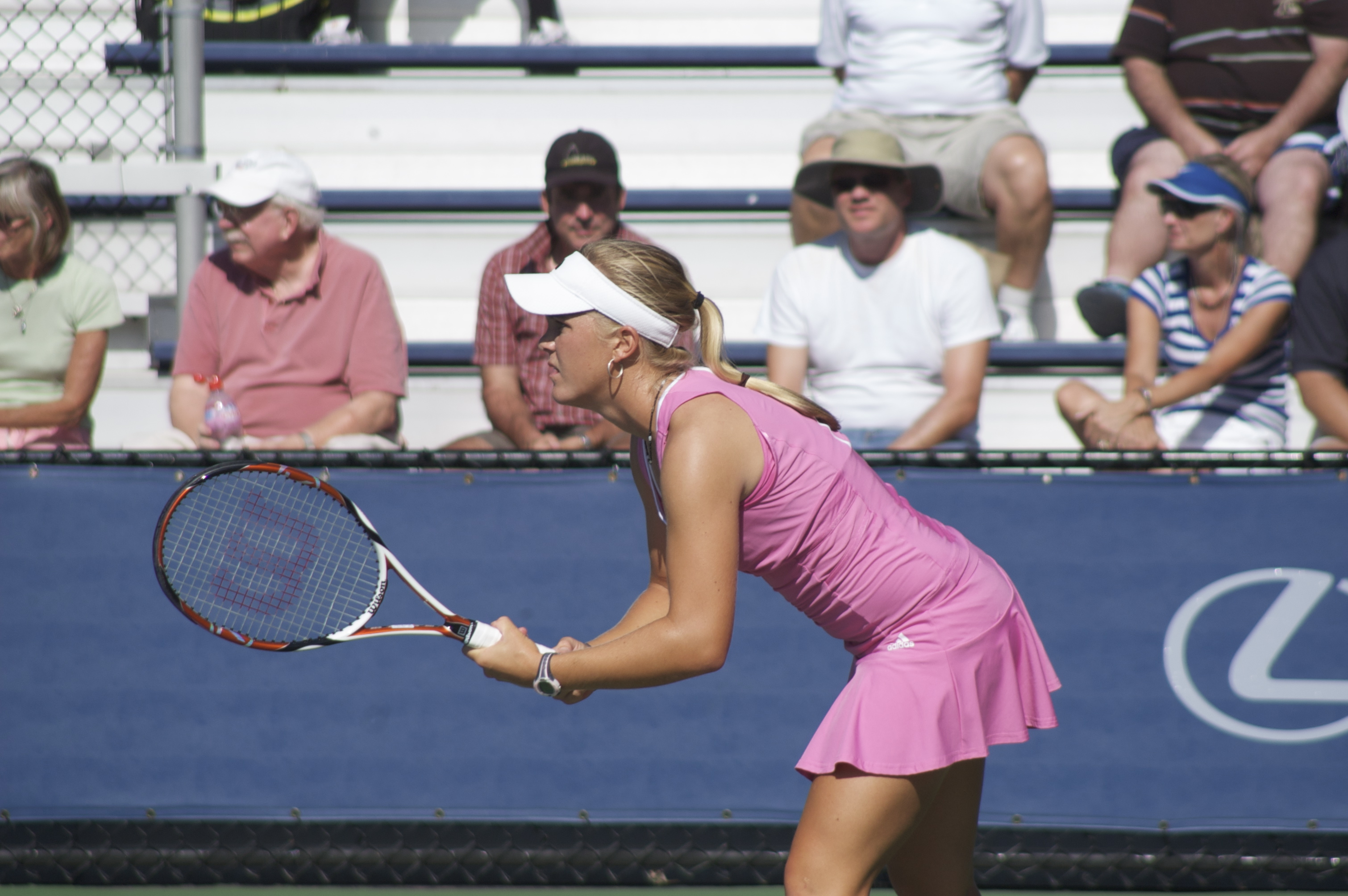
Melanie Oudin, the number two seed, was knocked out in the semi-finals by Paz-Franco.

==== Girls' ====
In the girls' singles final, American wild card CoCo Vandeweghe defeated Gabriela Paz Franco 7–6(3), 6–1. Both players were inexperienced coming into the final: it was Vandeweghe's first tournament win on the ITF Tour, and Paz-Franco, who called the tournament an "amazing experience", was playing in her first junior Grand Slam. Vandeweghe, who is the niece of former basketball player Kiki Vandeweghe, credited her improved performances to greater maturity. Their match, like the boys' final, was concluded relatively quickly.

By reaching the finals, Britton and Vandeweghe became the first American boy/girl duo to make the singles finals since 1992, when Brian Dunn and Lindsay Davenport did so.

==== Doubles ====
The junior doubles competitions were rescheduled for Friday evening before Super Saturday, to avoid the weather. In the boys' doubles, Niki Moser and Cedrik-Marcel Stebe defeated Henri Kontinen and Christopher Rungkat in a close final, 7–6(5), 3–6, 10–8. In the girls', Noppawan Lertcheewakarn and Sandra Roma defeated Mallory Burdette and Sloane Stephens, 6–0, 6–2. Lertcheewakarn said she was glad to have won for Roma, who was playing in her final junior Grand Slam. Roma said that she would like to partner Lertcheewakarn again at some point in the future.

== Seniors ==
=== Men's singles ===
(Switzerland) Roger Federer defeated (United Kingdom) Andy Murray, 6–2, 7–5, 6–2

- It was Federer's third title of the year, and his 56th overall. It was his 13th career Grand Slam title, and his fifth (consecutive) US Open title.

=== Women's singles ===
(United States) Serena Williams defeated (Serbia) Jelena Janković, 6–4, 7–5

- It was Williams's fourth title of the year, and her 32nd overall. It was her ninth career Grand Slam title, and her third US Open title.

=== Men's doubles ===
(United States) Bob Bryan / (United States) Mike Bryan defeated (Czech Republic) Lukáš Dlouhý / (India) Leander Paes, 7–6(5), 7–6(10)

=== Women's doubles ===
(Zimbabwe) Cara Black / (United States) Liezel Huber defeated (United States) Lisa Raymond / (Australia) Samantha Stosur, 6–3, 7–6(6)

=== Mixed doubles ===
(Zimbabwe) Cara Black / (India) Leander Paes defeated (United States) Liezel Huber / (United Kingdom) Jamie Murray, 7–6(6), 6–4

== Juniors ==
=== Boys' singles ===
(Bulgaria) Grigor Dimitrov defeated (United States) Devin Britton, 6–4, 6–3

=== Girls' singles ===
(United States) CoCo Vandeweghe defeated (Venezuela) Gabriela Paz Franco, 7–6(3), 6–1

=== Boys' doubles ===
(Austria) Niki Moser / (Germany) Cedrik-Marcel Stebe defeated (Finland) Henri Kontinen / (Indonesia) Christopher Rungkat, 7–6(5), 3–6, [10–8]

=== Girls' doubles ===
(Thailand) Noppawan Lertcheewakarn / (Sweden) Sandra Roma defeated (United States) Mallory Burdette / (United States) Sloane Stephens, 6–0, 6–2

== Wheelchair ==
The wheelchair events did not take place in 2008 due to a calendar conflict with the Beijing Summer Paralympic Games.

== Legends ==
=== Men's champions invitational ===
(Australia) Pat Cash defeated (Sweden) Mats Wilander, 6–2, 6–2

=== Women's champions invitational ===
(United States) Martina Navratilova defeated (Czech Republic) Jana Novotná, 6–3, 6–3

=== Mixed champions invitational ===
(United States) Anne Smith / (United States) Stan Smith defeated (United States) Ilana Kloss / (Argentina) Guillermo Vilas, 6–4, 6–4

== Seeds ==
=== Men's singles ===
1. (Spain) Rafael Nadal (semifinals, lost to Andy Murray)
2. (Switzerland) Roger Federer (champion)
3. (Serbia) Novak Djokovic (semifinals, lost to Roger Federer)
4. (Spain) David Ferrer (third round, lost to Kei Nishikori)
5. (Russia) Nikolay Davydenko (fourth round, lost to Gilles Müller)
6. (United Kingdom) Andy Murray (final, lost to Roger Federer)
7. (Argentina) David Nalbandian (third round, lost to Gaël Monfils)
8. (United States) Andy Roddick (quarterfinals, lost to Novak Djokovic)
9. (United States) James Blake (third round, lost to Mardy Fish)
10. (Switzerland) Stanislas Wawrinka (fourth round, lost to Andy Murray)
11. (Chile) Fernando González (fourth round, lost to Andy Roddick)
12. (France) Richard Gasquet (first round, lost to Tommy Haas)
13. (Spain) Fernando Verdasco (third round, lost to Igor Andreev)
14. (Croatia) Ivo Karlović (third round, lost to Sam Querrey)
15. (Spain) Tommy Robredo (fourth round, lost to Novak Djokovic)
16. (France) Gilles Simon (third round, lost to Juan Martín del Potro)
17. (Argentina) Juan Martín del Potro (quarterfinals, lost to Andy Murray)
18. (Spain) Nicolás Almagro (third round, lost to Gilles Müller)
19. (France) Jo-Wilfried Tsonga (third round, lost to Tommy Robredo)
20. (Germany) Nicolas Kiefer (first round, lost to Ivo Minář)
21. (Russia) Mikhail Youzhny (withdrew due to illness)
22. (Czech Republic) Tomáš Berdych (first round, lost to Sam Querrey)
23. (Russia) Igor Andreev (fourth round, lost to Roger Federer)
24. (France) Paul-Henri Mathieu (second round, lost to Mardy Fish)
25. (Germany) Philipp Kohlschreiber (second round, lost to Viktor Troicki)
26. (Russia) Dmitry Tursunov (third round, lost to Nikolay Davydenko)
27. (Spain) Feliciano López (first round, lost to Jürgen Melzer)
28. (Czech Republic) Radek Štěpánek (third round, lost to Roger Federer)
29. (Argentina) Juan Mónaco (first round, lost to Kei Nishikori)
30. (Croatia) Marin Čilić (third round, lost to Novak Djokovic)
31. (Italy) Andreas Seppi (third round, lost to Andy Roddick)
32. (France) Gaël Monfils (fourth round, lost to Mardy Fish)

=== Women's singles ===
1. (Serbia) Ana Ivanovic (second round, lost to Julie Coin)
2. (Serbia) Jelena Janković (final, lost to Serena Williams)
3. (Russia) Svetlana Kuznetsova (third round, lost to Katarina Srebotnik)
4. (United States) Serena Williams (champion)
5. (Russia) Elena Dementieva (semifinals, lost to Jelena Janković)
6. (Russia) Dinara Safina (semifinals, lost to Serena Williams)
7. (United States) Venus Williams (quarterfinals, lost to Serena Williams)
8. (Russia) Vera Zvonareva (second round, lost to Tatiana Perebiynis)
9. (Poland) Agnieszka Radwańska (fourth round, lost to Venus Williams)
10. (Russia) Anna Chakvetadze (first round, lost to Ekaterina Makarova)
11. (Slovakia) Daniela Hantuchová (first round, lost to Anna-Lena Grönefeld)
12. (France) Marion Bartoli (fourth round, lost to Sybille Bammer)
13. (Hungary) Ágnes Szávay (second round, lost to Tathiana Garbin)
14. (Belarus) Victoria Azarenka (third round, lost to Caroline Wozniacki)
15. (Switzerland) Patty Schnyder (quarterfinals, lost to Elena Dementieva)
16. (Italy) Flavia Pennetta (quarterfinals, lost to Dinara Safina)
17. (France) Alizé Cornet (third round, lost to Anna-Lena Grönefeld)
18. (Slovakia) Dominika Cibulková (third round, lost to Agnieszka Radwańska)
19. (Russia) Nadia Petrova (third round, lost to Flavia Pennetta)
20. (Czech Republic) Nicole Vaidišová (second round, lost to Séverine Brémond)
21. (Denmark) Caroline Wozniacki (fourth round, lost to Jelena Janković)
22. (Russia) Maria Kirilenko (first round, lost to Tamira Paszek)
23. (United States) Lindsay Davenport (third round, lost to Marion Bartoli)
24. (Israel) Shahar Pe'er (first round, lost to Li Na)
25. (Italy) Francesca Schiavone (second round, lost to Anne Keothavong)
26. (Spain) Anabel Medina Garrigues (second round, lost to Zheng Jie)
27. (Ukraine) Alona Bondarenko (third round, lost to Venus Williams)
28. (Slovenia) Katarina Srebotnik (fourth round, lost to Patty Schnyder)
29. (Austria) Sybille Bammer (quarterfinals, lost to Jelena Janković)
30. (Japan) Ai Sugiyama (third round, lost to Serena Williams)
31. (France) Virginie Razzano (first round, lost to Timea Bacsinszky)
32. (France) Amélie Mauresmo (fourth round, lost to Flavia Pennetta)

== Qualifier entries ==
=== Men's qualifiers entries ===
1. (Germany) Björn Phau
2. (Czech Republic) Jan Minář
3. (Australia) Robert Smeets
4. (United States) Robert Kendrick
5. (Czech Republic) Tomáš Zíb
6. (Brazil) Thiago Alves
7. (United States) Ryler DeHeart
8. (Czech Republic) Jan Hernych
9. (Portugal) Rui Machado
10. (Germany) Andreas Beck
11. (South Africa) Rik de Voest
12. (Chile) Paul Capdeville
13. (United States) Ryan Sweeting
14. (Uruguay) Pablo Cuevas
15. (Luxembourg) Gilles Müller
16. (Switzerland) Stéphane Bohli

The following players received entry into a lucky loser spot:

1. (Kazakhstan) Andrey Golubev
2. (Pakistan) Aisam-ul-Haq Qureshi
3. (Italy) Flavio Cipolla

=== Women's qualifiers entries ===
1. (Czech Republic) Hana Šromová
2. (Russia) Anastasia Pivovarova
3. (Czech Republic) Sandra Záhlavová
4. (United States) Kristie Ahn
5. (China) Zhang Shuai
6. (Chinese Taipei) Hsieh Su-wei
7. (Switzerland) Stefanie Vögele
8. (Germany) Anna-Lena Grönefeld
9. (Italy) Roberta Vinci
10. (Paraguay) Rossana de los Ríos
11. (Kazakhstan) Yaroslava Shvedova
12. (United States) Shenay Perry
13. (France) Julie Coin
14. (United States) Alexa Glatch
15. (Romania) Raluca Olaru
16. (Italy) Maria Elena Camerin

The following players received entry into a lucky loser spot:

1. (Colombia) Mariana Duque Mariño

== Protected ranking ==
The following players were accepted directly into the main draw using a protected ranking:

Men's singles

- (Slovakia) Dominik Hrbatý

== Wildcard entries ==
Below are the lists of the wildcard awardees in the main draw.

=== Men's singles ===
1. (Australia) Carsten Ball
2. (United States) Amer Delić
3. (United States) Brendan Evans
4. (United States) Scoville Jenkins
5. (United States) Austin Krajicek
6. (United States) Jesse Levine
7. (France) Laurent Recouderc
8. (United States) Sam Warburg

=== Women's singles ===
1. (France) Séverine Brémond
2. (United States) Gail Brodsky
3. (United States) Jamea Jackson
4. (United States) Asia Muhammad
5. (Australia) Jessica Moore
6. (United States) Melanie Oudin
7. (United States) Ahsha Rolle
8. (United States) CoCo Vandeweghe

=== Men's doubles ===
1. (United States) Chase Buchanan / (United States) Ryan Harrison
2. (United States) Amer Delić / (United States) Alex Kuznetsov
3. (United States) Robby Ginepri / (United States) Travis Rettenmaier
4. (United States) John Isner / (United States) Sam Querrey
5. (United States) Robert Kendrick / (United States) Ryan Sweeting
6. (United States) Jesse Levine / (United States) Donald Young
7. (United States) Michael McClune / (United States) Kaes Van't Hof

=== Women's doubles ===
1. (United States) Gail Brodsky / (United States) Mallory Cecil
2. (United States) Julie Ditty / (United States) Carly Gullickson
3. (United States) Christina Fusano / (United States) Shenay Perry
4. (United States) Jamie Hampton / (United States) CoCo Vandeweghe
5. (United States) Angela Haynes / (United States) Ahsha Rolle
6. (United States) Tracy Lin / (United States) Riza Zalameda
7. (United States) Asia Muhammad / (United States) Melanie Oudin

=== Mixed doubles ===
1. (United States) Jill Craybas / (United States) Eric Butorac
2. (United States) Alexa Glatch / (United States) Scott Lipsky
3. (United States) Asia Muhammad / (United States) Sam Querrey (withdrew)
4. (United States) Melanie Oudin / (United States) Donald Young
5. (United States) Sloane Stephens / (United States) Robert Kendrick
6. (United States) Riza Zalameda / (United States) Kaes Van't Hof

== Withdrawals ==
Men's singles

- (Croatia) Mario Ančić → replaced by (United States) Wayne Odesnik
- (Cyprus) Marcos Baghdatis → replaced by (Spain) Óscar Hernández
- (Argentina) Juan Ignacio Chela → replaced by (Portugal) Frederico Gil
- (Spain) Juan Carlos Ferrero → replaced by (Kazakhstan) Andrey Golubev
- (Netherlands) Robin Haase → replaced by (Spain) Pablo Andújar
- (Australia) Lleyton Hewitt → replaced by (Croatia) Roko Karanušić
- (Austria) Stefan Koubek → replaced by (Pakistan) Aisam-ul-Haq Qureshi
- (Croatia) Ivan Ljubičić → replaced by (Japan) Kei Nishikori
- (Russia) Mikhail Youzhny → replaced by (Italy) Flavio Cipolla

Women's singles

- (France) Tatiana Golovin → replaced by (Russia) Ekaterina Bychkova
- (United States) Ashley Harkleroad → replaced by (Australia) Samantha Stosur
- (India) Sania Mirza → replaced by (Colombia) Mariana Duque Mariño
- (Japan) Akiko Morigami → replaced by (Japan) Aiko Nakamura
- (Russia) Maria Sharapova → replaced by (Estonia) Maret Ani

Preceded by 2008 Wimbledon Championships	Grand Slam events	Succeeded by 2009 Australian Open
