= Jaydes discography =

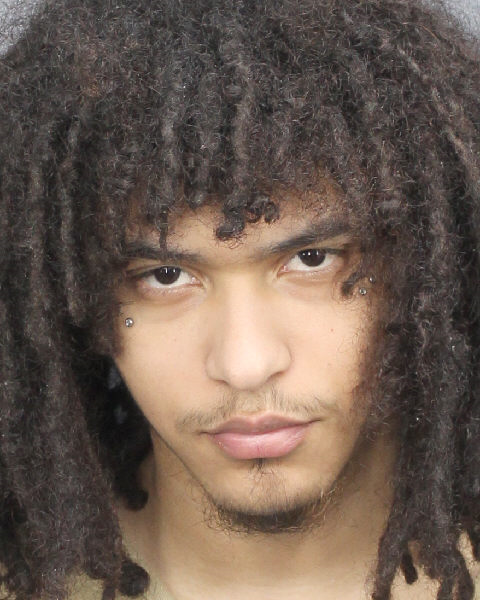
- Studio albums: 4
- EPs: 6
- Singles: 20+
- Music videos: 6

American musician Jaydes has released three studio albums, six extended plays (EPs), and six music videos. His music has been released through the American record label 10K Projects, and was distributed by Virgin Music Group. He began his musical career in 2019, and released music to SoundCloud under his Evvls pseudonym the following year. Several of his songs—"Highschool", "Vivienne", "Trust Issues", "South", and "Clueless", would later gain traction online, and help with the popularization of the PluggnB genre in 2021. In December of that same year, Jaydes released his debut extended play (EP) !?.

In 2022, he signed with 10K Projects and released his second EP, Heartpacing, featuring fellow American musicians Riovaz and Rich Amiri. Later that same year in November, Jaydes released another EP, Sativa. The following year, Dumont released his debut studio album, Ghetto Cupid. In May 2024, he released his fifth EP, Bipolar, before self-releasing Count Up Dracula in July 2024, and Panic in November 2024.

== Studio albums ==
=== As Jaydes ===
Title	Details
Ghetto Cupid	Released: August 16, 2023; Label: 10K Projects; Formats: Digital download, streaming
Count Up Dracula	Released: July 19, 2024; Label: Self-released; Formats: Digital download, streaming

=== As Yen ===
Title	Details
Yen	Released: January 23, 2026; Label: Self-released; Formats: Digital download, streaming
You Owe Me	Released: August 7, 2026; Label: Self-released; Formats: Digital download, streaming

== Extended plays ==
Title	Details
!?	Released: December 31, 2021; Label: Self-released; Formats: Digital download, streaming
Romanticism	Released: April 30, 2022; Label: Self-released; Formats: Digital download, streaming
Heartpacing	Released: August 14, 2022; Label: 10K Projects; Formats: Digital download, streaming
Sativa	Released: November 8, 2022; Label: Self-released; Formats: Digital download, streaming
Bipolar	Released: May 8, 2024; Label: Self-released; Formats: Digital download, streaming
Panic	Released: October 31, 2024; Label: Self-released; Formats: Digital download, streaming

== Singles ==
Title	Year	Album
"Slugs"	2022	Non-album singles
"Don't Worry Bout Me"	2022	Non-album singles

== Guest appearances ==
Title	Year	Other artist(s)	Album
"For The Better"	2022	Rich Amiri	For The Better
