= One call (disambiguation) =

One call can refer to:

- One Call, a former American boyband
- One-call, another name for utility location
- "One Call" (Gunna song), 2019, from the album Drip or Drown 2
- "One Call" (Rich Amiri song), 2023
- One Call Away (disambiguation)
  - "One Call Away" (Chingy song), a 2003 song by American rapper Chingy
  - "One Call Away" (Charlie Puth song), a 2015 song by American singer Charlie Puth
- One Call Insurance
- One Call Stadium
