= Bunii =

American musician (born 2007)

- Bunii in 2026

Background information
- Born: Niccolo Virgilio Terre; August 25, 2007 (age 19); Glendale, California, U.S.
- Genres: Indie rock; alt-rock; pop-rock; emo; SoundCloud indie
- Occupations: Singer-songwriter; record producer
- Label: Warner Music Group
- Website: www.buniiofficial.com

Niccolo Virgilio Terre (born August 25, 2007), professionally known as Bunii (stylized in all lowercase; pronounced "booni"), is a Filipino-American singer-songwriter and record producer. Born in Glendale, California, he learned to play the trumpet and ukulele during his childhood and the guitar during his adolescence. He first produced hip-hop beats for rappers before becoming a solo artist and uploading music in 2024. He gained attention with a series of EPs including Six (2024) and 8:30 Is Too Early (2025), alongside his debut studio album Bastard (2025). He signed with Warner Records and released his second studio album, Virgilio (2026), which was supported by the Lonely Tour.

He was influenced by Japanese rock, early 2000s pop-punk, and emo bands. Self-producing his music, he mainly uses the producer tag "Bastards" in his songs. His prior production style was mainly influenced by hip-hop producers such as Metro Boomin and Murda Beatz, which he used Genius' "Deconstructed" videos to learn.

== Early life ==
Niccolo Virgilio Terre was born on August 25, 2007 in Glendale, California to a Filipina-American mother and an Italian-American father, and later moved to Wisconsin. Bunii grew up in a musically active family, with music being present on both sides of his family. In an interview with The Fader, Bunii reported that his father played music instrumentals and that he was frequently exposed to music in his household during childhood. Bunii began writing music at the age of three, when he wrote a song with his older cousin, which he stated to be "toddler gibberish". He began learning percussion at age four, when his mother bought him a drum kit. He learned to play the trumpet in middle school and later played in his high school's jazz ensemble. He learned the ukulele soon after.

== Career ==
=== 2022–2024: Music production and breakthrough ===
Bunii began making music independently in his early teens, initially teaching himself FL Studio to produce beats for other rappers at the age of 15. Also creating hip-hop beats on Logic Pro, he soon experimented with alternative rock. In 2023, he transitioned into a solo artist. Bunii started uploading music in 2024. He developed his music during late adolescence, while still in high school, shortly before graduating. When creating "Rott", he sought to create a distinctive identity in his music.

In 2024, Bunii gained breakthrough traction with the release of his second extended play (EP), Six, which included the song "Saint". He began releasing music regularly after experiencing his first track exceeding 1,000 streams, which motivated increased output. When first producing music, he stated in an interview that if he did not play the instruments then "it's not [his] song". Although his uncle had given him a miniature red Fender Stratocaster years earlier, he did not begin learning to play it until 2024. He later explained that his fingers had been "too weak and small" for his hand to manage the fretboard. Motivated to learn due to feeling "like such a poser" for not playing the guitar, his initial approach was to learn difficult guitar songs immediately.

=== 2025–present: Early releases and Virgilio ===
In January 2025, Bunii released the EP 8:30 Is Too Early. In March 2025, he released two singles, which received promotional visibility, including billboard advertising. In a column by Kieran Press-Reynolds, Bunii, along with Ayowitty, were grouped alongside other notable SoundCloud indie artists, including Jaydes and Wifiskeleton. In June 2025, he and Ayowitty released "Dotsong". Press-Reynolds praised the song, stating that the song "hits like a flashbang of textural excess," while also stating that the composition of the song shouldn't "go together, yet they somehow do". In July 2025, he released his debut album Bastard, which received praise from Vivian Medithi of The Fader for songs on the album that "just jam".

After releasing Bastard, Bunii stated he started to work on his next album. In March 2026, Bunii released his second album, Virgilio, through Warner Records, after being signed around that same time. Jude Noel of The Fader described the album as a refinement of his previous works and acclaimed Bunii's guitar riffs and vocals. Medithi praised the technical skill of Bunii's riffs and described them as "razor-honed". They characterized the album as a "mathrock-meets-Midwest-emo debut," while commending the songwriting, described his "pen" as "as sharp as his licks" when addressing subjects including his Filipino heritage, marijuana use, fame, and adolescence. Supporting the album, the composition of "Crash" mixed pop-punk with math rock, receiving a generally positive review from Medithi, stating that they "can't wait to hear more" on Virgilio. Beginning as a deluxe edition to Bastard, the album was later expanded into a larger project, mainly to pay tribute to his family. In an interview with Vuze, Bunii cited his later grandfather, Virgilio, as an important influence on his life and music. As part of the tribute, he recorded a cover of "The Great Pretender", which had been one of his grandfather's favorite songs. He announced the Lonely Tour as the supporting tour, and all five shows sold out. After announcing his EP Watsnext, he also announced the supporting tour, Buniiversity, and released the supporting single, "Tethered", on August 14. The music video for the song places Bunii in the role of Ritchie Valens and recreates a scene from the 1987 biographic film La Bamba.

== Musical style and influences ==
Bunii's influences include Japanese rock bands such as Susquatch and the Cabs, also influenced by early 2000s pop-punk and emo bands, including Paramore, My Chemical Romance, and American Football. His musical influences of genres include emo, indie rock, and Japanese rock. He stated in an interview with The Fader that his musical style developed from music he had been exposed to over time, rather than from a deliberate decision to pursue a specific genre. He also has a pluggnb influence.

Bunii self-produces his music and commonly uses the producer tag "Bastards!" or "Six-fucking-yari" in his songs. His solo work is described as guitar-driven, incorporating math rock-influenced structures. His earlier production style was influenced by pluggnb and Internet-based beat culture, particularly artists such as Autumn, and by educational content such as Genius' "Deconstruction" video series. During a period in his career, Bunii was influenced by jazz standards. One of his compositions, "Grand Mal", incorporated elements inspired by "Blue Bossa." His production style is described as fast-paced and collage-like, focusing on capturing immediate ideas rather than highly polished studio construction. His music on Virgilio includes lyrics that address both personal experiences and external subjects, compared to the more inward-focused themes of earlier releases. During his hip-hop beat production, he was influenced by artists such as Metro Boomin and Murda Beatz.

Films have also influenced Bunii's songwriting. In an interview with Vuze, he cited La Bamba, Whiplash, and O Brother, Where Art Thou? among his favorite films, and said that films played a significant role in his development as a storyteller. On his EP, Watsnext, he drew inspiration from O Brother, Where Art Thou? for the song "Big Dan Teague Killed Pete". His music output includes experimentation with structure, including the use of very short tracks alongside full-length songs. As his career went on, his work began to develop a complete narrative through lyrics and instrumentation. He also stated that what he writes about comes from his experiences when he "[feels] alone and unheard," stating that he wants the project to serve as a "voice for those who have had similar experiences."

== Tours ==
- The Lonely Tour (2026)
- Buniiversity Tour (2026)

== Discography ==
=== Albums ===
List of albums, showing selected details
Title	Details
Bastard	Released: July 25, 2025; Label: Self-released; Formats: Digital download, streaming
Virgilio	Released: March 27, 2026; Label: Warner Records; Formats: CD, Digital download, streaming, vinyl

=== Extended plays ===
List of extended plays, showing selected details
Title	Details
Opo	Released: August 3, 2024; Label: Self-released; Formats: Digital download, streaming
Six	Released: October 18, 2024; Label: Self-released; Formats: Digital download, streaming
8:30 Is Too Early	Released: January 10, 2025; Label: Self-released; Formats: Digital download, streaming
Watsnext	Released: August 28, 2026; Label: Warner Records; Formats: Digital download, streaming
