= SoundCloud indie =

Online music scene and style of indie rock

- Other names: BandLab rock; SoundCloud indie rock
- Stylistic origins: Indie rock; alternative rock; SoundCloud rap; emo; underground hip-hop
- Cultural origins: Early 2020s, United States
- Typical instruments: Vocals; guitar; drum machines; DAW

Other topics
- Internet music; GothAngelz; incelcore; zoomergaze; laptop twee; emo rap

SoundCloud indie (also known as BandLab rock or SoundCloud indie rock) is a style of indie rock and scene that emerged in the early 2020s. The genre is defined as a form of indie and alternative rock emerging from the SoundCloud rap underground scene while primarily distributed on the online streaming service SoundCloud. The style primarily draws influences from artists such as Alex G, Wifiskeleton, and Jaydes.

In 2025, the style grew in popularity on TikTok, with artists making use of beatmaker techniques, Alex G samples, drum machines, looped guitar beats, and sound effect ad-libs. Notable acts include Aeter, Ayowitty, Bunii, Crayon, Ebril, Overtonight, and Yiru.

== Etymology and characteristics ==
In August 2025, Kieran Press-Reynolds of Pitchfork coined the term "BandLab rock", referring to the free online DAW to describe "a new wave of SoundCloud indie rock" made by artists emerging from the underground SoundCloud rap scene who began to take an interest in alternative rock music while using beatmaker techniques. Press-Reynolds referred to the movement as an "online 'indie music' boom".

According to Press-Reynolds, SoundCloud indie artists tend to be members of SoundCloud collectives and use beatmaker techniques like opening and ending songs with slowed versions of the instrumental, or "spamming sound effects like ad-libs". Press-Reynolds noted that bedroom producers in the scene posted video tutorials on YouTube for "indie rock beats (without a real guitar)". They also noted that the genre "is closer to emo—often aggressively dramatic, either in the volatile sounds or the woe-stricken lyrics", and that the genre was made up of underground rappers who decided to make alternative rock. Press-Reynolds labelled the genre as " claustrophobic, packed with sound effects, sped-up vocals, and compressed, crushed mixes".

Writing for The Fader, music journalist Vivian Medithi stated that the scene was influenced by the work of Paramore and Alex G while defined by the prominence of bedroom artists who made use of modern beatmaker recording techniques such as "punched-in vocals", adlibs and drum machines, adding that the scene puts a "digital touch" on alt-rock music. Medithi described the genre as existing between "traditional indie rock" and "the hyper-collaborative, Discord-based structures of underground rap".

The scene is primarily inspired by artists Jaydes and Wifiskeleton. Artist Ayowitty stated that in 2025 a new wave of musicians began producing "Wifiskeleton type songs" and replicating his sound to the point of cliché, while Bunii added that artists imitating Wifiskeleton's sound were popular across TikTok.

== History ==
In August 2025, Press-Reynolds credited musicians Jaydes and Wifiskeleton with inspiring a "new wave of SoundCloud indie rock". They compared them to American rapper XXXTentacion, who had similarly emerged from SoundCloud rap and later made rock music. They noted that "a particular strain of depressive droning over looped guitar beats [had] really taken off in the last year". Notable acts included Aeter, Ayowitty, Bunii, Crayon, Ebril, Overtonight, and Yiru. The Fader's Vivian Medithi later described the movement as "SoundCloud's new indie scene".

In 2026, music journalist Eli Enis noted the popularity of the "losercore playlist", a playlist on Spotify which featured some SoundCloud indie artists such as Wifiskeleton and Aeter. The playlist was promoted through what Zach Sweat of Yahoo Entertainment called "bizarringly elaborate" AI-generated videos on TikTok, calling the videos one of the "most ridiculed Internet memes of 2026". Other artists used to promote the playlist included Fried by Fluoride and TV Girl.

== See also ==
- Zoomergaze — a Gen Z revival of shoegaze
- Incelcore — an Internet music microgenre inspired by incel culture
- Internet rock — style of rock music inspired by Internet culture, which SoundCloud indie is a derivative of
