= Suburban Daredevil =

2024 mixtape by Wifiskeleton

Mixtape by Wifiskeleton
- Released: October 22, 2024
- Studio: Temple University
- Genres: Alternative rock; emo rap
- Length: 15:42
- Label: Hallwood
- Producer: Wifiskeleton

Wifiskeleton chronology
Lovefool (2024)	Suburban Daredevil (2024)	July (2024)

Suburban Daredevil (stylized in all lowercase) is the second mixtape by American rapper and singer-songwriter Wifiskeleton, released on October 22, 2024, through Hallwood.

== Background ==
Suburban Daredevil was released through Hallwood on October 22, 2024. Wifiskeleton recorded the mixtape on Temple University's campus with help from his manager, Joseph Conallen. The title is a direct reference to the 2010 Disney XD animated series Kick Buttowski: Suburban Daredevil.

== Critical reception ==
AllMusic described Suburban Daredevil as "more fully realized and more carefully produced" compared to Wifiskeleton's previous works.

== Commercial performance ==
Suburban Daredevil peaked at number 31 in Lithuania in 2025. The single "Nope Your Too Late I Already Died" peaked at 91 on the Billboard Hot 100, as well as 17 on the Hot Rock & Alternative Songs chart. Outside the US, the song appeared on charts in the United Kingdom, Ireland, Canada, Lithuania, and the Global 200.

== Track listing ==
All tracks are written by Wifiskeleton.

Suburban Daredevil track listing
No.	Title	Producer(s)	Length
1.	"I Don't Think We'll Ever Find Him"	Alex G^{[a]}	1:04
2.	"Whore"	Six Days After Christmas; I Wanna Be a Jack-o-Lantern	1:23
3.	"I Keep Calling ..." (with Jaydes)	Alijah4k	1:22
4.	"If You Hate Me Now It Would Make Me Proud"	Kevin Parker^{[b]}	1:22
5.	"Ware Me Out Like Old Clothes"	Six Days After Christmas	1:30
6.	"El Sonata (An Interlude for the Parasitic)"	Wifiskeleton	1:02
7.	"Don't You Wanna See Me Soon"	MBRK	1:04
8.	"Suburban Daredevil"	Kevin Parker^{[c]}	1:14
9.	"My Twenty First Reason </3"	Slow Pulp^{[d]}	1:45
10.	"Girl"	Jacob Bugden; Rick Rubin^{[e]}	1:10
11.	"Party"	Michael Harrison	1:10
12.	"Nope Your Too Late I Already Died" (with I Wanna Be a Jack-o-Lantern)	I Wanna Be a Jack-o-Lantern	1:30
Total length:			15:42

Notes

- All tracks are stylized in all lowercase, except for "Nope Your Too Late I Already Died", which is stylized as "Nope your too late i already died".

Sample credits

- ^{^[a]} "I Don't Think We'll Ever Find Him" contains a sample of "Trick (Acoustic Version)" by Alex G.
- ^{^[b]} "If You Hate Me Now It Would Make Me Proud" contains a sample of "Endors Toi" performed by Tame Impala, produced by Kevin Parker.
- ^{^[c]} "Suburban Daredevil" contains a sample of "Mind Mischief" performed by Tame Impala, produced by Kevin Parker.
- ^{^[d]} "My Twenty First Reason </3" contains a sample of "Steel Birds" by Slow Pulp.
- ^{^[e]} "Girl" contains a sample of "Beaches" performed by Beabadoobee, produced by Jacob Bugden and Rick Rubin.

== Personnel ==
- Joseph Conallen – recording assistant

== Charts ==
Chart performance for Suburban Daredevil
Chart (2025)	Peak position
Lithuanian Albums (AGATA)	31
