= Arthur Ashe Kids' Day =

Annual tennis and children's event at the Arthur Ashe Stadium

Arthur Ashe Kids' Day is an annual tennis/children's event that takes place in the end of August at the United States Tennis Association at Arthur Ashe Stadium. (USTA) Center in Flushing Meadows, Queens, New York. It is sponsored by IBM and the USTA. This event also begins the U.S. Open, which officially starts one day later. This event was also televised on CBS the following day, until 2014 when it lost U.S. Open broadcast rights to ESPN. Beginning in 2015, the event airs on ESPN2. It is a celebration of the memory of Arthur Ashe, who died of AIDS in 1993, and of his efforts to help young people through tennis. Kids’ Day began in 1993, the year that Ashe died.

At the 2005 event, the United States Postal Service unveiled and issued the Arthur Ashe Commemorative Postal Stamp in the presence of the Ashe family. The 2011 event originally scheduled for August 27, 2011 was cancelled in the wake of the forthcoming Hurricane Irene. This marked the first time the event was cancelled in advance. The 2020 and 2021 events were also cancelled due to the COVID-19 pandemic.

Participants at the Arthur Ashe Kids Day have an opportunity to play and/or watch numerous tennis matches before and after the main event at Arthur Ashe Stadium at the USTA Center. The main event at the stadium consists of a concert and tennis matches. As people enter the stadium, they are handed hats to commemorate the event.

Tennis greats that have appeared annually at Arthur Ashe Kids Day include Venus and Serena Williams, Roger Federer, Rafael Nadal, Andre Agassi, Andy Roddick, Novak Djokovic, Kim Clijsters, and Anna Kournikova, who play to entertain the children and families and to raise money for charity. Kids Day has been hosted by MTV VJ Quddus and sportscaster and ‘’Figure It Out’’ host Summer Sanders. Many popular singers have also performed at Kids Day, including Britney Spears, Jessica Simpson, 98 Degrees, Bow Wow, Ne-Yo, Jesse McCartney, Justin Bieber, Rihanna, O Town, JoJo, Monica, Jonas Brothers, Ariana Grande, and many others. During the day many tennis stars sign autographs and take pictures with the children.

== Events ==
	Date	Host	Tennis players (Note: There might be more players than listed; the ones listed are cited)	Performers	Other celebrities	Ref.
2nd Arthur Ashe Kids' Day	August 23, 1997		John McEnroe, Andre Agassi	Hanson	Bill Cosby	
3rd Arthur Ashe Kids' Day	August 29, 1998	Bill Cosby	Pete Sampras, Andre Agassi, John McEnroe, Serena Williams, Venus Williams	Backstreet Boys		
4th Arthur Ashe Kids' Day	August 28, 1999	Mark McEwen	Pete Sampras, Andre Agassi, John McEnroe, Serena Williams, Martina Hingis, Patrick Rafter, Michael Chang, Mary Pierce	Britney Spears		
5th Arthur Ashe Kids' Day	August 26, 2000		Pete Sampras, Andre Agassi, John McEnroe, Arantxa Sanchez-Vicario, Martina Hingis, Jennifer Capriati, Alexandra Stevenson	Jessica Simpson, 98 Degrees		
6th Arthur Ashe Kids' Day	August 25, 2001		Andre Agassi, Andy Roddick, Lleyton Hewitt, Martina Hingis, Serena Williams	Lil' Bow Wow and O-Town		
7th Arthur Ashe Kids' Day	August 24, 2002	Summer Sanders and Quddus	Andre Agassi, Pete Sampras, James Blake, Andy Roddick, Serena Williams, Anna Kournikova	Mario, BBmak, and Vanessa Carlton		
8th Arthur Ashe Kids' Day	August 23, 2003	Summer Sanders	Andre Agassi, Andy Roddick, James Blake, Anna Kournikova	Daniel Bedingfield, Monica, and Smash Mouth		
9th Arthur Ashe Kids' Day	August 28, 2004		Andy Roddick, Bob and Mike Bryan, Roger Federer, Serena Williams, Venus Williams, Jennifer Capriati	JoJo and Gavin DeGraw		
10th Arthur Ashe Kids' Day	August 27, 2005	Summer Sanders and Quddus	Andy Roddick, Roger Federer, Rafael Nadal, Serena Williams, Lindsay Davenport, Martina Navratilova, Anna Kournikova	Rihanna, Jesse McCartney, and The Click Five		
11th Arthur Ashe Kids' Day	August 2006	Daisy Fuentes and Quddus	Andre Agassi, Andy Roddick, James Blake, Serena Williams, Anna Kournikova	Ne-Yo, The Cheetah Girls, Cheyenne Kimball, and Teddy Geiger		
12th Arthur Ashe Kids' Day	August 26, 2007	Daisy Fuentes and Quddus	Roger Federer, Andy Roddick, Rafael Nadal, Sam Querrey, Serena Williams, Martina Hingis, Ana Ivanovic, Daniela Hantuchová	The Jonas Brothers, Sean Kingston, Kat De Luna, and Lil Mama	John Cena, Tony Hawk, Rob Thomas	see also 2007 Arthur Ashe Kids Day
13th Arthur Ashe Kids' Day	August 23, 2008		Roger Federer, Rafael Nadal, Andy Roddick, Novak Djokovic, Ana Ivanovic, Serena Williams	Demi Lovato, Colby O'Donis and Menudo		
14th Arthur Ashe Kids' Day	August 29, 2009	Susie Castillo and Quddus	Roger Federer, Any Roddick, James Blake, Serena Williams, Maria Sharapova	Jordin Sparks and Justin Bieber	Will Ferrell	
15th Arthur Ashe Kids' Day	August 28, 2010	Adrienne Bailon and Quddus	Rafael Nadal, Roger Federer, Andy Roddick, Novak Djokovic, Kim Clijsters	The Jonas Brothers, Demi Lovato, Shontelle, and Allstar Weekend	Nick Cannon, Lindsey Vonn	
16th Arthur Ashe Kids' Day (cancelled)	August 27, 2011	La La Anthony and Quddus	Rafael Nadal, Andy Roddick, Novak Djokovic, Kim Clijsters, David Wagner	Original program: Jason Derulo, Cody Simpson, Jessica Jarrell, and Greyson Chance	Bradley Cooper, Carmelo Anthony	
17th Arthur Ashe Kids' Day	August 2012	Jordin Sparks and Quddus	Roger Federer, Andy Roddick, Novak Djokovic, Mardy Fish, Ryan Harrison, Serena Williams, Kim Clijsters, Sloane Stephens, Christina McHale	Carly Rae Jepsen with Owl City, Rachel Crow, The Wanted, and Mindless Behavior	Matthew Morrison, Missy Franklin, Brad Richards	
18th Arthur Ashe Kids' Day	August 24, 2013	Missy Franklin and Quddus	Serena Williams, Roger Federer, Novak Djokovic, Rafael Nadal, David Wagner	Fifth Harmony, Ariana Grande, Austin Mahone, Lawson, Coco Jones and Cazzette. Free concert: Before You Exit, Kenton Duty, Trevor Jackson, Megan Nicole, CityKids and Lucki Gurlz		
19th Arthur Ashe Kids' Day	August 24, 2014	China Anne McClain, Jeff Sutphen, and Shaun Thompson	Serena Williams, Victoria Azarenka, Novak Djokovic, Andy Murray	Hunter Hayes, MKTO, The Vamps, Shawn Mendes, McClain and Madison Beer. Free concert: Hollywood Ending, Kalin and Myles, Zach Matari, Karina Rae and The Bomb Digz		
20th Arthur Ashe Kids' Day	August 29, 2015	Shaun T, Brooke Taylor	Serena Williams, Roger Federer, Novak Djokovic, Rafael Nadal, Madison Keys, Marin Cilic.	Bea Miller, Kalin & Myles, Jacob Whitesides, Natalie La Rose and American Authors. Free concert: Alessia Cara, Forever in Your Mind, Carson Lueders, Sweet Suspense, Jena Rose.		
21st Arthur Ashe Kids' Day	August 27, 2016	Joey Bragg, Jordan Fisher, Laura Marano	Serena Williams, Venus Williams, Mackenzie McDonald, Monica Puig, Juan Martin del Potro, Jack Sock, Maria Sakkari, Louisa Chirico, Samantha Crawford, Novak Djokovic, Rafael Nadal.	Galaxy Empire All Starz, Citizen Four, Sophie Beem, Tegan Marie, Troye Sivan, Los 5. Free concert: Flo Rida, Forever in Your Mind, Zara Larsson, Ansel Engort.		
22nd Arthur Ashe Kids' Day	August 26, 2017	Sofia Carson, Alex Aiono	Roger Federer, Venus Williams, Rafael Nadal, Angelique Kerber, CiCi Bellis, Frances Tiafoe, Ernesto Escobedo, Claire Liu.	Skyler Steckler, Spencer Sutherland, Summer Valentine. Free concert: Why Don't We, New Hope Club, Saving Forever, Jack & Jack.		
23rd Arthur Ashe Kids’ Day	August 25, 2018	Alex Aiono, Morgan Tompkins	Serena Williams, Rafael Nadal, Novak Djokovic, Angelique Kerber and Madison Keys	CNCO, Echosmith and In Real Life, Kim Petras		
24th Arthur Ashe Kids' Day	August 24, 2019	Meg Donnelly, Morgan Tompkins, JD McCrary	Rafael Nadal, Novak Djokovic, Sloane Stephens, Coco Gauff, Bob and Mike Bryan	Austin Mahone, Blanco Brown, MAX and Ava Max		
25th Arthur Ashe Kids' Day (cancelled)	August 23, 2020					
26th Arthur Ashe Kids' Day (cancelled)	August 28, 2021					
27th Arthur Ashe Kids' Day	August 27, 2022		Venus Williams, Taylor Fritz, John Isner, Frances Tiafoe, Maria Sakkari	Dude Perfect, Nicky Youre, Em Beihold, Young Dylan, Good NEWZ Girls, Brandon Hernandez		
28th Arthur Ashe Kids' Day	August 26, 2023					
