= Old Streets =

2019 single by 2KBaby

Single by 2KBaby

from the album Pregame Rituals
- Released: June 27, 2019
- Length: 1:45
- Label: Masked; Heavy Hitters; Warner
- Songwriter(s): Christian Todd; Damichael Green; Danny Hajj; Alan Passmore
- Producer(s): Busta Keys; Hajj; HalfSpun

2KBaby singles chronology
"Dirty 30's" (2019)	"Old Streets" (2019)	"Dreaming" (2019)

Music video
- "Old Streets" on YouTube

"Old Streets" is a song by American rapper 2KBaby, released on June 27, 2019. It is his breakout song and the lead single from his debut studio album Pregame Rituals (2020). An official remix of the song featuring American rapper Lil Durk was released on March 27, 2020 and also appears on the album.

== Background and promotion ==
"Old Streets" was produced by 2KBaby's brother Busta Keys and is the first song that he ever produced. It is also one of the first songs in which 2KBaby performs in his melodic style. When Busta Keys played the beat for 2KBaby, the rapper started freestyling on it. They ran outside and shot a short video from a phone of him singing the song a cappella. The clip went viral on social media during the summer of 2019. It eventually caught the attention of music entrepreneur Roger Gengo, who then signed him to his label Masked Records.

== Composition ==
The song finds 2KBaby combining rapping and singing, lyrically reflecting on the hardships and obstacles he faced when growing up while still nostalgically remembering his life on his street in the past.

== Certifications ==
Region	Certification	Certified units/sales
United States (RIAA)	Platinum	1,000,000^{‡}
^{‡} Sales+streaming figures based on certification alone.
