= Incelcore =

Internet music microgenre

- Etymology: Incel + -core
- Other names: Shootercore
- Stylistic origins: Rock; punk rock; electronic; alternative rock
- Cultural origins: 2019, United States

Other topics
- Blackpill; edgelord; Nazi chic; chanspeak; doomer wave; scenecore; internet aesthetic; 4chan; shitposting; SoundCloud indie

Incelcore is an Internet microgenre of rock music and online subculture that emerged in 2019 with the release of the compilation album MSG Vol. 1. The style was originally pioneered by musician and Internet personality Negative XP (formerly known as School Shooter), drawing influence from punk, electronic and alternative rock.

According to the Canadian Anti-Hate Network, not all artists and fans identify with the incel movement; however, they evoke the same themes of self-hate, hopelessness, and misogyny. In 2021, an incelcore concert known as "Virginfest", self-described as an "incel music festival", was hosted by Athena Raven Rapp in Atlanta, Georgia, with Negative XP billed as a headliner. Music publication Pitchfork described incelcore as "dour or woe-is-me or stupidly edgy," with lyrics inspired by 4chan's speaking culture.

Notable artists include Fried By Fluoride, Negative XP, Gezebelle Gaburgably, and UhOhSlater.

== Etymology and characteristics ==
According to the Canadian Anti-Hate Network, writer Dan Collen stated that incelcore draws from "internet culture, symbolism and terminology". The genre draws musical influences from punk, electronic and alternative rock. Collen adds that not all artists and fans identify with the incel movement; however, they evoke the same themes of Self-hatred, hopelessness, and misogyny. Collen further stated that incelcore was a musical and online subculture influenced by the "imagery, attitudes and irony" of internet image boards and that references to mass shooters were a common subject. Merchandise of Varg Vikernes' project Burzum is noted as "not uncommon among incelcore fans". Writing for Pitchfork, music journalist Kieran Press-Reynolds described incelcore as a "tragic rock microgenre," as well as "dour or woe-is-me or stupidly edgy" with lyrics inspired by "chanspeak", 4chan's speaking culture.

== History ==
=== Music ===
The various artists compilation album MSG Vol. 1 (2019) led to the emergence of the incelcore scene.

The Atlanta Antifascists organization stated that incelcore emerged in 2019 with the release of the MSG Vol. 1 compilation album. The opening track "Scott Pilgrim vs. the World Ruined a Whole Generation of Women" by Negative XP is cited as emblematic of the genre. The song was met with controversy and internet virality due to lyrics which demeaned and poked "fun" at alternative subcultures. In 2021, Athena Raven Rapp hosted an incelcore concert known as "Virginfest". Artists featured on the Virginfest concert poster were Negative XP, Gezebelle Gaburgably, Hard Christ, Hot Leather, Bad Takes Only, Egg White, Greens on Toast, Anhero, Gjallarhornit and Pacific Purgatory. Other notable incelcore acts include Fried By Fluoride and UhOhSlater.

According to a 2023 article by writer Dan Collen, published by the Canadian Anti-Hate Network, incelcore had originally been pioneered by musician and internet personality Negative XP, formerly known as "School Shooter". Artists mentioned by Collen in the article include Gezebelle Gaburgably, Gjallarhornit, Weatherboy, Zen Michelin and Brynn Michen. Gaburgably would be noted as one of the genre's "most well-known artists". Allegedly, she was Gjallarhornit's "former partner". Additionally, Collen claimed that due to Negative XP creating a live streaming account on Fuentes' website Cozy TV, incelcore had overlap with "Groyper" culture and Nick Fuentes' America First group.

Writing for the Canadian Anti-Hate Network, Dan Collen warned that artists in the scene would be performing in Toronto and Montreal in 2023. He stated that artist Brynn Miche's romantic partner, "Jimbo Zoomer," had streamed on Nick Fuentes' platform Cozy TV, posted antisemitic content online, and shared an Instagram post photographed with Fuentes. Collen stated Gezebelle Gaburgably's song "Christ Church Bible Study Club" made light of the 2019 Christchurch Mosque attack. He added that the scene also made light of other mass murders by right-wing extremists, claiming that it "celebrates mass shootings".

==== Negative XP ====
Negative XP
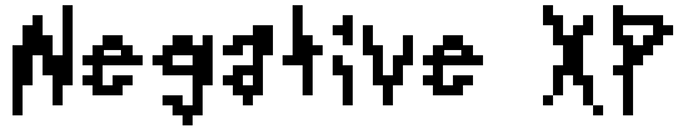
- Official logo associated with Negative XP

Background information
- Also known as: School Shooter
- Born: Alan S. Kim; United States
- Origin: Chicago, IL
- Genre: E-Punk
- Occupations: Singer; record producer; songwriter
- Years active: 2015–present
- Formerly of: MSG
- Past members: Riley Burke; Christian Esparza
- Website: negativexp.com

Alan S. Kim known professionally as Negative XP or School Shooter is an American musician and internet personality who originally coined and pioneered the incelcore genre. The project originally began as a three piece band in Chicago, IL in 2016, featuring Riley Burke on bass and Christian Esparza on drums. As a three piece band originally going by School Shooter, they rehearsed and recorded some of the earliest School Shooter songs in a self made recording studio in the basement of a pawnshop in the Bucktown area that drummer Christian Esparza was employed in at the time – with the permission of his manager. Esparza initially produced all of the band's earliest recordings himself. Only two recordings during this period – Cry 4 Help and Better Off Dead – were released on SoundCloud and Bandcamp, but were eventually deleted from the platforms. The trio only played two live shows at a south side Chicago DIY venue called Jurassic Park. Kim was enrolled at Depaul University at the time, along with bassist Riley Burke, but eventually turned School Shooter into a solo project – taking on all instrumentation and production himself – after moving back to his hometown of Springfield, Illinois. According to Dirty South Right Watch, his lyrics reference mass shootings, suicide and "murdering women". Writer Dan Collen of the Canadian Anti-Hate Network described Kim as a "prominent far-right musician". According to Variety magazine, Kim's work as Negative XP was featured in the 2020 documentary film TFW No GF directed by Alex Lee Moyer. His work has been described as criticizing culture as a whole, likening e-girls and internet music critic Anthony Fantano to the CIA MKUltra program. Although he has been labeled as spearheading his "own brand of counterculture", some of his lyrics have also been described as misogynistic.

=== Virginfest ===
Original poster for Virginfest concert headlined by Negative XP in Atlanta, Georgia on September 11, 2021

In 2021, several prominent incelcore musicians performed at a concert in Atlanta, Georgia known as "Virginfest," which was regarded as a self-described "incel music festival". The festival was organized by Athena Raven Rapp, also known as Raven, at her workplace, Toki Tattoo. Negative XP is noted for headlining Virginfest. Musician Gisele Gurney, known professionally as Gezebelle Gaburgably, would also perform as an opener for the concert. Other artists featured on the concert poster included Hard Christ, Hot Leather, Bad Takes Only, Egg White, Greens on Toast, Anhero, Gjallarhornit, and Pacific Purgatory. The show would sell out tickets with around 50 people in attendance. However, Atlanta Antifascists reported on the planned festival, which led to the venue Toki Tatt2 announcing that they would not host the event. The festival was then moved to Chosewood Park as an outdoor event. At around 8:30 pm, police showed up at the park due to calls regarding loitering and a false claim about a man brandishing a gun, though the two officers who arrived instead "partook in the event" while taking selfies with concert-goers. Raven, who originally hosted the event, would be fired from her job at Toki Tattoo following the performances.

In September, the Dirty South Right Watch's writer Gurgeh Banks published an article regarding the event and the incelcore scene's appropriation of far-right imagery, stating "'Ironic' usage of far-right language and symbols paves the way for serious far-right presence in the scene." Banks claimed that "The event attracted a large crowd of edgelords, but mixed in were serious far-right actors who understood the opportunity presented by the gathering." Banks further stated, "Most attendees appeared to be younger than 25, and the majority were white, although not exclusively so." He claimed that far-right media personality Andy Nowicki, who at the time was in his 40s, attended the event and streamed it live. Banks equated the event to a 4chan /b/ or /pol/ meetup, "filled with shitposters and instigators larping for attention and acceptance from the group with 'ironic' hate speech."

== Antioch High School shooting ==
On January 22, 2025, a school shooting occurred at Antioch High School in the Antioch neighborhood of Nashville, Tennessee, United States. The attack was orchestrated by 17-year-old student Solomon Henderson, who opened fire inside the school's cafeteria, killing one student and injuring another student before he committed suicide. According to the Global Project Against Hate and Extremism, Henderson cited music such as "incelcore" or "shootercore" along with Kanye West, as influencing his violence.

In 2025, the Anti-Defamation League reported in an article that Henderson's Bluesky account referenced being an MKUltra victim, which was a possible "obscure" reference to Negative XP's incelcore song of the same name.

== Other uses ==
On January 27 or 28, 2019, CBC Television's program The Fifth Estate featured Toby Reynolds (also known as Egg Man or Egg White) on their episode on the incel subculture (S44 E10, segment "The Lone Wolf"). The episode involved several incel mass murderers, such as Elliot Rodger who committed the 2014 Isla Vista killings and Alek Minassian who committed the 2018 Toronto van attack. The program briefly featured and discussed Egg White's song "Alek Minassian" which was described as "hateful". Reynolds was described as "28, out of school, a video gamer with no job and no hope for his future".

In 2020, Pitchfork stated that the term "male manipulator music" had been used synonymously with "incelcore". The term emerged on TikTok, with discussions on Twitter prompting users to cite groups such as Radiohead, Slowdive, and the Smiths as red flags for the archetypes' music taste.

In 2021, The Quietus stated that the pop-punk "progenitors" Milo Aukerman of the band Descendents, introduced a "gynecological juvenilia and gurls-are-weird rhetoric that has, more recently and only a little unfairly, caused the band to be described as 'incelcore'". In 2022, British newspaper The Guardian equated rock band Red Hot Chili Peppers to incelcore due to their early work's extreme masculine image: "If Red Hot Chili Peppers' earlier work was defined by a strain of masculinity so aggressive that the funk-metal genre it inspired might better have been called incelcore".

In 2023, Vice magazine stated that the hashtag "#incelcore" on the social media platform TikTok, resulted in content that praised the mass shooter Elliot Rodger, who is commonly associated with the incel subculture. That same year, British magazine I-D published an article on "incel cinema" which stated, "what is crudely referred to as 'incel cinema' (or 'incelcore') are films that never intended for that to be their fate. Films like Taxi Driver, American Psycho and Fight Club (which Edward Norton recently called 'proto-incel') have been appropriated by the subculture".

In 2025, French musician Violent Sadie Mode released an EP entitled Incelcore.

== See also ==
- Blackpill – Online subculture
- Doomer wave – Music subgenre based on Wojak doomer Internet meme
- Internet aesthetic – Visual styles and subcultures associated with the internet
- Wojak – Internet meme
- /r9k/ – Music discussion board on 4chan
- Generation Z – Cohort born from 1997 to 2012
- Internet music – Music influenced by Internet culture
- Internet rock – Style of rock music influenced by Internet culture
- List of subcultures
- Youth subculture – Subcultures associated with young people
- Nazi chic – Fashion trend
- /mu/ – Music discussion board on 4chan
- Hatecore – Music promoting white supremacy
- Pepe the Frog – Comic character and Internet meme
- Shitposting – Intentionally posting poor-quality social media posts
- SoundCloud indie – Online music scene and style of indie rock

== Sources ==
- Kelley, Mark (29 January 2019). "Inside Incel". The Fifth Estate. CBC News.
