= Ghetto Cupid =

Studio album by Jaydes
- Released: August 29, 2023
- Recorded: 2022–2023
- Genres: Plugg; emo rap
- Length: 32:54
- Labels: 10K Projects; Self-released (initial release)
- Producers: 0grave; BossUp; Grayskies; Jaydes; Jewxlry; KRXXK; Marcusbasquiat; Ric Ocasek; Srrybouturshoes

Jaydes chronology
Sativa (2022)	Ghetto Cupid (2023)	Bipolar (2024)

Singles from Ghetto Cupid
- 1. "Undercover" Released: January 21, 2023; 2. "Kesha K" Released: April 13, 2023

Ghetto Cupid is the debut studio album by the American musician Jaydes. It was released on August 29, 2023, through 10K Projects. The album was recorded between 2022 and 2023, after Dumont had started working on new material for a new project. The album was supported by two singles: "Undercover" and "Kesha K". Consisting of seventeen tracks and a duration of around thirty-two minutes, it was entirely produced by Jaydes, who was accompanied by multiple other record producers.

Ghetto Cupid is a plugg and hip-hop record that incorporates elements of pop and rock. The album was written by Dumont following the release of his third extended play, Heartpacing (2022), and centers on self-destructive behavior in relationships and the pursuit of a self-destructive partner. Upon release, Ghetto Cupid received acclaim from music critics, who praised the confidence of the lyrics and the music's enjoyability.

== Background and recording ==
In August 2022, Jaydes released his third extended play (EP), Heartpacing, which later gained significant traction online. He began to work on his debut studio album following a string of single releases. In an interview with the American media company Our Generation Music, Jaydes stated that the album was originally titled Magenta. He expressed that the album's concept and cover were changed because he no longer felt connected to his original vision. Jaydes released the album's first single, "Undercover", on January 21, 2023 as a standalone single on SoundCloud. A plugg song, Pitchfork's Alphonse Pierre discussed its "exasperated lip flap". The second and final single, "Kesha K", would also be released to SoundCloud on April 13, 2023. Ghetto Cupid was preceded by the singles "Undercover" and "Kesha K", both initially released on SoundCloud. In late 2023, the album's opening track, "Rose", went viral on the social media platform TikTok.

== Composition ==
=== Overview ===
Music journalists described Ghetto Cupid as a plugg and shoegaze release. Pitchfork's Alphonse Pierre felt that Jaydes was a decent writer, and that his songs were mostly about his mood. The reviewer commented on the appeal of Jaydes' music, saying that it was the appliance of the sort of sentimental sing-rapping usually done on GothBoiClique-type beats. Ghetto Cupid has a duration of about 33 minutes, and contains 17 tracks, with production primarily handled by Jaydes himself alongside various record producers, marking his switch to using guitars for making music.

=== Tracks ===
Alphonse Pierre said that "[he] flips Weezer on "Misery", and wanted to make sure listeners know "his influences go beyond rap". Pierre also wrote that "Brief bits add texture to the melodrama: from the exasperated lip flap at the beginning of 'Undercover', to the spammed producer tag—'you have no heart'—on 'Horror'."

== Critical reception ==
Professional ratings
Review scores
Source	Rating
Pitchfork	7.5/10

Alphonse Pierre writing for Pitchfork gave the album a score of 7.5 out of 10, explaining that the project pulls together disparate strands, from plugg to shoegaze and emo; going further into detail, he stated that the album is "messy, but [it] works more often than not", also comparing it to the likes of My Bloody Valentine and Lucki. The reviewer also said while the "hodgepodge should be corny", it's not, "because he's just so earnest about it all". Pierre felt that Jaydes had layered "soft" and "lovelorn" melodies over a wide range of beats. While Matthew Strauss had said that the project was a "follow-up" to his success with his previous extended play (EP), Heartpacing (2022), and felt that it was more "expansive".

== Track listing ==
All tracks are written by Jayden Yen Dumont.

Ghetto Cupid track listing
No.	Title	Producer(s)	Length
1.	"Rose"	Grayskies	2:06
2.	"Anemic"	Jaydes	2:16
3.	"Let Me B"	Jaydes	1:34
4.	"Numb"	Jaydes	2:10
5.	"Witchybitchy"	Jaydes	1:59
6.	"Damage"	Jaydes	1:32
7.	"<3"	Srrybouturshoes; Jewxlry	2:58
8.	"Undercover"	Jaydes	2:12
9.	"Dead Girl"	Nick Raskulinecz^{[a]}; Jaydes	1:21
10.	"Fallen"	Marcusbasquiat	1:12
11.	"Valentine"	Jaydes	1:58
12.	"Misery"	Ric Ocasek^{[b]}	1:28
13.	"Spaz"	Jaydes	1:50
14.	"Kesha K"	BossUp	1:38
15.	"Laylow"	0grave	1:42
16.	"Horror"	Jaydes	2:51
17.	"Draculea"	KRXXK	2:07
Total length:			32:54

Notes

- All tracks are stylized in lowercase.

Sample credits

- ^{^[a]} "Dead Girl" contains a sample of "Sextape", written by Stephen Carpenter, Abe Cunningham, Chino Moreno, Frank Delgado, and Sergio Vega, produced by Nick Raskulinecz as performed by Deftones.
- ^{^[b]} "Misery" contains a sample of "Undone – The Sweater Song", produced by Ric Ocasek as performed by Weezer.

== Personnel ==
Credits adapted from Apple Music.

- Jaydes – vocals, songwriting
- Grayskies – production (track 1,2)
- Marcusbasquiat – production (10)
- Srrybouturshoes – production (track 7)
- Jewxlry – production (track 7)
- BossUp – production (track 14)
- 0grave – production (track 15)
- Krxxk – production (track 17)
