= Scam Likely =

Single by Jaydes

from the EP !?
- Released: December 31, 2021
- Genre: Plugg; trap
- Length: 1:25
- Songwriter: Jayden Dumont
- Producer: MexikoDro

"Scam Likely" is a song by American rapper Jaydes, released as the third track of his debut extended play (EP) !? on December 31, 2021. Written by Jaydes and produced by MexikoDro, it was described by critical commentary as an homage to the popularity wave of plugg music. The track later gained traction online.

== Background and composition ==
Following the song's release, it garnered virality online on streaming platforms such as SoundCloud. The track centers on themes of money and relationships. "Scam Likely" is 1 minute and 25 seconds long. It is a plugg and trap song. Pitchfork's Alphonse Pierre wrote about how the song "Pays homage to the first wave of plugg [...] Over a quintessential mid-2010s MexikoDro beat with all the fixings—trapaholics tag, money counter sample, ATL trap drums, and twinkling keys."

== Critical reception ==
Writing for Pitchfork, Alphonse Pierre commented on the song, expressing that it was a stray away from Jaydes' usual musical style, also saying "He tests out an emotionless delivery that makes him sound like a lost member of the Goth Money Records collective."

== Personnel ==
Credits adapted from Tidal.

- Jaydes – vocals, songwriting, recording, mixing, mastering
- MexikoDro – production (sample of "Dope Runna" by Kane Grocerys)
