= 2007 Arthur Ashe Kids Day =

The 2007 Arthur Ashe Kids Day was a series of exhibition matches and special events the day before the first day of the official main draws of 2007 U.S. Open. Note that results and trivia are from CBS.

== Results ==
While some players are not professional tennis players, matches are still played. Lets are played, and it is not a match; the person (even with one more point) who has the most points in 7 minutes wins the exhibition

- Martina Hingis and Ana Ivanovic defeated Andy Roddick and John Cena.
- Andy Roddick and Rob Thomas defeated Tony Hawk and Sam Querrey, 7-5.

== Other performances ==
- "SOS" was performed by the three Jonas Brothers. They also made another performance.
- Daniela Hantuchová, Rafael Nadal, Serena Williams, Roger Federer competed for charities. Every player would get 30 seconds to hit a certain stroke and make as many targets as possible (the players went more than once, but once with every stroke). The team and two other participants between forehand and backhand hit every player that went was for their own charity. Williams won the competition.
- Sean Kingston performed "Beautiful Girls".
- Mary Joe Fernández helped teach kids tennis.
