= 2007 US Open (tennis) =

- Date: August 27 – September 9
- Edition: 127th
- Category: Grand Slam (ITF)
- Surface: Hardcourt
- Location: New York City, U.S.
- Venue: USTA Billie Jean King National Tennis Center

Champions

Men's singles
- (Switzerland) Roger Federer

Women's singles
- (Belgium) Justine Henin

Men's doubles
- (Sweden) Simon Aspelin / (Austria) Julian Knowle

Women's doubles
- (France) Nathalie Dechy / (Russia) Dinara Safina

Mixed doubles
- (Belarus) Victoria Azarenka / (Belarus) Max Mirnyi

Wheelchair men's singles
- (Japan) Shingo Kunieda

Wheelchair women's singles
- (Netherlands) Esther Vergeer

Wheelchair quad singles
- (United Kingdom) Peter Norfolk

Wheelchair men's doubles
- (Japan) Shingo Kunieda / (Japan) Satoshi Saida

Wheelchair women's doubles
- (Netherlands) Jiske Griffioen / (Netherlands) Esther Vergeer

Wheelchair quad doubles
- (United States) Nick Taylor / (United States) David Wagner

Boys' singles
- (Lithuania) Ričardas Berankis

Girls' singles
- (Slovakia) Kristína Kučová

Boys' doubles
- (France) Jonathan Eysseric / (France) Jérôme Inzerillo

Girls' doubles
- (Belarus) Ksenia Milevskaya / (Poland) Urszula Radwańska

Men's champions invitational
- (United States) Todd Martin

Women's champions invitational
- (Spain) Conchita Martínez and (Czech Republic) Jana Novotná

Mixed champions invitational
- (Belarus) Natasha Zvereva / (Ecuador) Andrés Gómez (United States) Anne Smith / (United States) Stan Smith
← 2006 ·	US Open	· 2008 →

The 2007 US Open was held from August 27 to September 9, 2007, at USTA Billie Jean King National Tennis Center at Flushing Meadows, New York City.

Roger Federer successfully defended his title, becoming the first man in the open era to win four consecutive US Open titles. Maria Sharapova was unsuccessful in defending her 2006 title, being upset in the third round by 18-year-old Agnieszka Radwańska of Poland. Justine Henin, the runner-up to Sharapova in 2006, won her second US Open title, this year without losing a set. It was the second Grand Slam she won in the year without losing a set, having also won the 2007 French Open earlier in the year. It was also her last Grand Slam title.

== Timeline ==
2007 US Open Timeline
Day	Comments
Q1.	No play was possible due to rain.
Q2.	Rain again was a factor in delaying play, however some of the qualifying was possible. After a rain delay, play resumed in many matches. Main draws for Men's and Women's singles were mostly ready aside from qualifiers' names, however spaces where qualifiers will go was indicated.
Q3.	The first round of qualifying was completed and second round matches began. In form Frank Dancevic came through in the men's draw; whilst French Open girls' singles champion Alizé Cornet came through in the women's.
Q4.	Players began qualifying for the main draw; the first on the men's side being Pablo Cuevas and the first on the women's, Renata Voráčová. Scoville Jenkins was the first American qualifier to reach the main draw.
Q5.	The qualification rounds concluded. Dancevic, Rainer Schüttler and Andrei Pavel qualified among others. On the women's side Cornet and Andreja Klepač came through, along with Julia Görges, who upset No. 6 seed Anne Kremer.
KD.	Kids Day was full of singing and special events. Charities were raised and matches with both professional (for example, Andy Roddick) and non-professional tennis players (for example, Tony Hawk), were played.
1.	Day 1 saw Ahsha Rolle, Feliciano López, Max Mirnyi, Alizé Cornet, John Isner and Donald Young cause upsets. Both Serena and Venus Williams advanced in straight sets. Guillermo Cañas needed four sets to beat Rubén Ramírez Hidalgo, and Fernando Verdasco survived Paul-Henri Mathieu, 1–6, 3–6, 6–4, 6–3, 6–3. Top seeds Roger Federer and Justine Henin began their campaigns with straight set victories.
2.	Day 2 saw Wayne Odesnik overcoming Danai Udomchoke and Arnaud Clément beating big-serving Ivo Karlović in thrilling matches. Martina Hingis, Juan Martín del Potro, David Nalbandian and Nicole Vaidišová were some of the day's victors as the women's first round matches were completed. No. 9 seed Daniela Hantuchová became the highest seed to fall in the women's draw, losing to Julia Vakulenko.
3.	Justine Henin, Serena and Venus Williams, Marat Safin, Carlos Moyà, Mikhail Youzhny, Tim Henman and Roger Federer advanced, while Rafael Nadal overcame severe knee pain to beat Australian wildcard Alun Jones. Other women to advance to round 3 include Jelena Janković, Ana Ivanovic, Lucie Šafářová, Marion Bartoli, Dinara Safina, Elena Dementieva, and local favorite Ahsha Rolle. No. 7 Fernando González lost to Teymuraz Gabashvili in his opening match.
4.	Day 4 saw Andy Roddick, Nikolay Davydenko, Tomáš Berdych, James Blake, Maria Sharapova, Martina Hingis and Svetlana Kuznetsova all get through their matches and enter the third round. No. 13 seed Richard Gasquet, however, walked-over from his second round match against Donald Young, and seeded Guillermo Cañas crashed out of the tournament.
5.	Radek Štěpánek and Novak Djokovic battled in their match for nearly five hours before Djokovic walked away with the victory. Other players who were upset in the men's draw were Lleyton Hewitt, Mikhail Youzhny and Marat Safin. Rafael Nadal's opponent retired and Tommy Robredo went five sets with Mardy Fish. Ivan Ljubičić, David Ferrer and Carlos Moyà were some of the seeded players to advance. Jelena Janković got through a struggle with Alizé Cornet. Sybille Bammer upset Elena Dementieva.
6.	Agnieszka Radwańska, seeded 30th, stunned the number two seed and defending champion Maria Sharapova 6–4, 1–6, 6–2. The upsets continued through the day in the women's draw, with Swiss players Martina Hingis and Patty Schnyder suffering defeat, along with another upset of Nadia Petrova packing. Andy Roddick, James Blake, Nikolay Davydenko, Tommy Haas and Tomáš Berdych all went through. Roger Federer also won despite losing a tight first set. However, Andy Murray lost to Korea's Lee Hyung-taik in four sets.
7.	The men's draw saw Carlos Moyà, David Ferrer, Juan Mónaco, Novak Djokovic, Rafael Nadal and Stanislas Wawrinka advance to make the fourth round. Ernests Gulbis upset Tommy Robredo and Juan Ignacio Chela upset twelfth seed Ivan Ljubičić. In the women's draw, Justine Henin beat Dinara Safina, Serena Williams beat Marion Bartoli, Jelena Janković beat Sybille Bammer and Venus Williams cruised past Ana Ivanovic.
8.	Tommy Haas, Shahar Pe'er, Roger Federer, Nikolay Davydenko, Svetlana Kuznetsova and Anna Chakvetadze all advanced. However, Julia Vakulenko lost out to Ágnes Szávay. In men's doubles, the top seeded Bryan brothers were upset by tenth-seeded Simon Aspelin and Julian Knowle. In women's doubles, second-seeded Lisa Raymond and Samantha Stosur were shocked by Bethanie Mattek and Sania Mirza.
9.	Novak Djokovic was able to defeat Juan Mónaco to set up a meeting with Carlos Moyà who beat Latvian Ernests Gulbis. Juan Ignacio Chela survived unseeded Stanislas Wawrinka in five sets to advance to the quarterfinals. Justine Henin beat Serena Williams to make the women's semifinals, and David Ferrer shocked Rafael Nadal in a thrilling four-set match.
10.	Roger Federer and Nikolay Davydenko have set up a match to earn a spot in the title match. In the women's draw, the semifinal line-up was complete with three matches taking the court. Anna Chakvetadze and Svetlana Kuznetsova will face off in the semifinals, and Venus Williams beat Jelena Janković in a thrilling encounter, with Venus having to come from a set down to eventually win 4–6, 6–1, 7–6.
11.	David Ferrer reached his first Grand Slam semi-final by defeating Juan Ignacio Chela, whereas Novak Djokovic beat Carlos Moyà 6–4, 7–6 (7), 6–1. and reach his third Grand Slam semifinal of the year. The mixed doubles competition was won by Max Mirnyi and Victoria Azarenka.
12.	Justine Henin came through in straight sets and defeated the Williams sisters in the same tournament. Only Martina Hingis has done this. Henin and Williams battled a classic, while Anna Chakvetadze at first dominated by errors of Svetlana Kuznetsova, but then Chakvetadze had errors and Kuznetsova got by 3–6, 6–1, 6–1.
13.	Justine Henin dominated her final against Svetlana Kuznetsova and didn't lose a set in the tournament. Her 6–1, 6–3 victory over the Russian gave her a second US Open title. Esther Vergeer and Jiske Griffioen won the Wheelchair Women's Doubles final while Japanese pair Shingo Kunieda and Satoshi Saida won the Wheelchair Men's Doubles final over Robin Ammerlaan and Michaël Jeremiasz. Jonathan Eysseric and Jérôme Inzerillo won the Boys' Doubles and Ksenia Milevskaya and Urszula Radwańska won the Girls' Doubles.
14.	Roger Federer won for the fourth consecutive year to bring his overall Grand Slam singles titles tally to twelve.
Homepage

== Notable stories ==
=== Player of the day ===
Player of the day were:

- Day 1: (United States) Donald Young for winning his first Grand Slam match over (Australia) Chris Guccione.
- Day 2: (France) Arnaud Clément for defeating someone over a foot taller than him.
- Day 3: (United States) Robby Ginepri for showing older form in his match against (Belgium) Olivier Rochus, winning a set in only 20 minutes.
- Day 4: (United Kingdom) Andy Murray for winning a five set match against (Sweden) Jonas Björkman, returning to top form found earlier on.
- Day 5: (Serbia) Ana Ivanovic for playing superb tennis in her matches and not dropping a set.
- Day 6: (Poland) Agnieszka Radwańska for causing the upset of the tournament in defeating defending women's singles champion (Russia) Maria Sharapova.
- Day 7: (Spain) David Ferrer for staying strong to defeat (Argentina) David Nalbandian.
- Day 8: (Israel) Shahar Pe'er for becoming the first Israeli player to make the quarterfinals of the US Open.
- Day 9: (Spain) Carlos Moyà for, despite his age, reaching the US Open quarterfinals in a match where he displayed his veteran style of play.
- Day 10: (Russia) Anna Chakvetadze for reaching the first Grand Slam semifinal of her career.
- Day 11: (Belarus) Victoria Azarenka for winning the mixed doubles title.
- Day 12: (Russia) Svetlana Kuznetsova for reaching her second US Open final.
- Day 13: Novak Djokovic for reaching his and Serbia's first (men's) Grand Slam final.
- Day 14: (Switzerland) Roger Federer for winning his 12th career Grand Slam and 4th consecutive U.S. Open title.

=== Important matches ===
- Rafael Nadal, seeded and ranked second, was tested by Alun Jones, who broke him in the first set before Nadal came back to break back and take the set 7–5. Jones, however, won the second set 6–3, and Nadal, more at ease, won the next two sets, finally advancing, 7–5, 3–6, 6–4, 6–1.
- Donald Young won his first Grand Slam match against Chris Guccione in four sets.
- Fernando Verdasco rallied in coming from two sets down to defeat Paul-Henri Mathieu, the 22nd seed. Verdasco was ahead 5–1 in the third set and 5–3 in the final set. He won a dramatic game and thus match in the fifth set.
- Daniela Hantuchová lost 6–4, 3–6, 6–1 to Julia Vakulenko, becoming the first top ten seed to exit the tournament.
- Teymuraz Gabashvili defeated No. 7 Fernando González in round 1 in 5 sets, having let sets 3 and 4 slip away, before rebounding 6–4 in the 5th.
- Ahsha Rolle continued her run at the 2007 US Open after coming from a set and a break down to defeat Italian Karin Knapp.
- James Blake defeated Fabrice Santoro 6–4, 3–6, 6–2, 4–6, 6–4 to achieve his first ever victory in a match that went to 5 sets, having gone 0–9 previously. He saved 3 break points at 4–4 in the final set.
- Novak Djokovic defeated Radek Štěpánek in five sets, where neither player won a set with a score of 6 games—Djokovic won the match 6–7 (4), 7–6 (5), 5–7, 7–5, 7–6 (2). After his victory, Djokovic fell to the ground and the players embraced each other. The match lasted four hours, 44 minutes and 63 games, equalling a record set in 1979.
- Maria Sharapova, the defending champion, was dumped out in the third round by Polish teenager Agnieszka Radwańska. After losing the first set, Sharapova responded by winning the second, 6–1. However, Radwańska was undeterred and broke Sharapova thrice in the final set, 6–2. This was the first time the number 2 women's seed had lost before Round 4 since Andrea Jaeger in 1981.
- Roger Federer defeated John Isner, making a run of 105 consecutive points without an unforced error during the second and third sets.
- Tommy Haas beat James Blake, 4–6, 6–4, 3–6, 6–0, 7–6 (4), despite winning 7 straight games and broke Blake in his first service game in the fifth set. Blake broke back and eventually had match points, but Haas saved them and had three match points. The first was saved by Blake with an in call that Haas incorrectly lost a Chase review. Blake went on to challenge, but the call was in and Haas won the match. Haas also was ahead in the tiebreak, but Blake edged back until Haas was ahead and won the match.
- Roger Federer was a set down, but came to set up a showdown with Andy Roddick in the quarterfinals, beating Feliciano López, 3–6, 6–4, 6–1, 6–4. Towards the end of the match, Federer won 35 consecutive points on serve.
- David Ferrer beat No. 2 seed Rafael Nadal 6–7(3), 6–4, 7–6(4), 6–2 in a match that finished at 1:51 a.m. local time. This was the third latest finish in US Open history. Ferrer admitted to having a McDonald's meal afterwards. The match itself lasted 3hrs, 28mins and was preceded by the Justine Henin–Serena Williams tie.
- Roger Federer went past Andy Roddick in the quarterfinals, in straight sets with the score 7–6, 7–6, 6–2 to set up a semi-final clash with Nikolay Davydenko.
- Justine Henin defeated Venus Williams 7–6 (2), 6–4 to reach the final. This match marked the first time since 2001 (Martina Hingis; Australian Open) that someone had defeated both Williams sisters in the same tournament. Henin did not lose a set on her way to the final.
- Novak Djokovic reached his first Grand Slam final, and in doing so became the first Serbian man to become a Grand Slam finalist. He beat David Ferrer 6–4, 6–4, 6–3.

=== Day-by-day summaries ===
==== Qualifying day 1 ====
Qualifying was impossible due to rain.

==== Qualifying day 2 ====
Qualifying Day 2 saw much rain. However, according to this link, players such as Emmanuelle Gagliardi, Pablo Cuevas, Jamie Baker, Steve Darcis, Alina Jidkova and Aisam-ul-Haq Qureshi were winners to the following round of qualifying. In addition, main singles draws for men and women were released, except qualifiers' names; however the draw shows where qualifiers will go. Roger Federer, seeded first, will play a qualifier for the first two rounds, and possibly three consecutive rounds.

==== Qualifying day 3 ====
The first round of qualifying was completed and second round matches began. In-form Frank Dancevic came through in the men's draw; whilst 2007 French Open Girls' Singles champion Alizé Cornet came through in the women's qualifying.

==== Qualifying day 4 ====
Players began qualifying for the main draw; the first on the men's side being Pablo Cuevas and the first on the women's, Renata Voráčová. Scoville Jenkins was the first American qualifier to reach the main draw.

==== Qualifying day 5 ====
Qualifying was completed as Dancevic, Rainer Schüttler and Andrei Pavel qualified among others such as Bruno Echagaray, who beat Robin Haase. On the women's side Cornet and Andreja Klepač came through, along with Julia Görges, who upset No. 6 seed Anne Kremer.

==== Kids Day ====
Coverage found on CBS or possibly other channels: Matches, songs and other events were held and played at the 2007 US Open Kids Day. Matches were held; including with non-professional tennis players Rob Thomas, Tony Hawk and John Cena, along with others who competed in non-match activities.

==== Day 1 ====
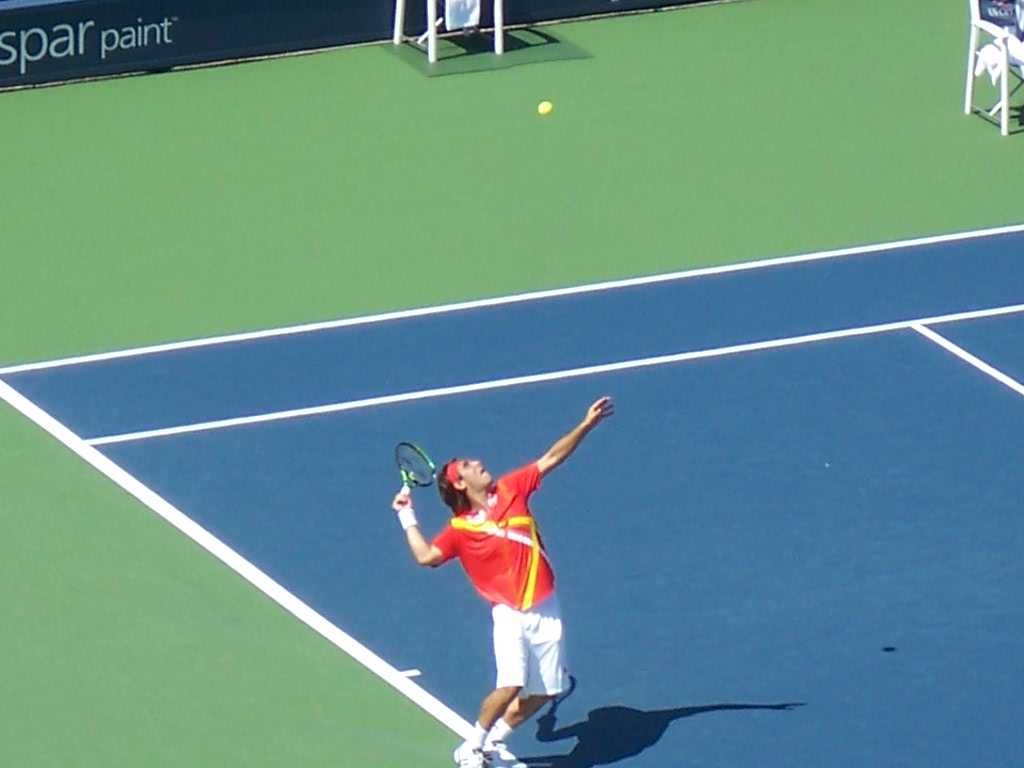
Marcos Baghdatis serving at the 2007 US Open

Day 1 saw Feliciano López was able to upset Juan Carlos Ferrero, 6–3, 6–4, 6–4. Max Mirnyi defeated Marcos Baghdatis 6–3, 7–5, 3–6, 7–6 (6), in an epic battle in which Mirnyi came back in the last-set tiebreaker from 1–5 to win 8–6. Both Venus Williams and Serena Williams continued runs, however young qualifier Alizé Cornet stunned Samantha Stosur. Wildcard talent John Isner played four sets and defeated the seeded Jarkko Nieminen. Guillermo Cañas needed four sets to beat Rubén Ramírez Hidalgo, while Fernando Verdasco came back to shock the crowd from two sets to love down to beat Paul-Henri Mathieu, 1–6, 3–6, 6–4, 6–3, 6–3. Julia Görges lost to Justine Henin; while Scoville Jenkins lost to Roger Federer, 6–3, 6–2, 6–4. Home favorite Ahsha Rolle took a 6–4, 1–6, 6–2 dramatic upset win over Tatiana Golovin in three sets. Donald Young also advanced and thus won his first ever US Open match, defeating Chris Guccione, 6–7 (2), 6–3, 6–2, 6–3.

- Seeded players out: Marcos Baghdatis, Juan Carlos Ferrero, Paul-Henri Mathieu, Jarkko Nieminen, Tatiana Golovin, Mara Santangelo, Samantha Stosur

==== Day 2 ====
Arnaud Clément and wildcard Wayne Odesnik were able to advance through their matches in five sets, while Lleyton Hewitt was one who easily beat his opponent. Nicole Vaidišová and Dominika Cibulková (who upset Tathiana Garbin) won their matches, while Sania Mirza was pushed and Laura Granville easily advanced. Others to win were Martina Hingis, Juan Martín del Potro, Dudi Sela, Jürgen Melzer, Pauline Paramentier and Virginie Razzano. Lastly, doubles competition began.

- Seeded players out: Ivo Karlović, Filippo Volandri, Tathiana Garbin, Daniela Hantuchová

==== Day 3 ====
Past champions Justine Henin, Serena Williams, Venus Williams, Marat Safin, and Roger Federer easily advanced to round 3 (Safin advanced to round 2), while Rafael Nadal overcame severe knee pain to beat Australian wildcard Alun Jones in 4 sets in his opening match. Tim Henman, playing in his final Grand Slam, stunned the crowd by taking out No. 27 seed Dmitry Tursunov in 4 sets to advance to round 2, joined by players such as Carlos Moyà and Mikhail Youzhny. Other women to advance to round 3 include Jelena Janković, Ana Ivanovic, Lucie Šafářová, Marion Bartoli, Dinara Safina, Elena Dementieva, and local favorite Ahsha Rolle. No. 7 Fernando González lost in his opening match, causing the upset of the tournament so far.

- Seeded players out: Fernando González, Dmitry Tursunov, Potito Starace, Ai Sugiyama
- Doubles seeds out: Mara Santangelo / Paul Hanley, Cara Black / Marcin Matkowski; Wesley Moodie / Fabrice Santoro; Maria Kirilenko / Elena Vesnina

==== Day 4 ====
The fourth day of action was all about the favorites, with most of them advancing. No. 2 seed Maria Sharapova was the highest seed in action on either draw, crushing her opponent Casey Dellacqua and she was joined by other former champions Andy Roddick, Martina Hingis and Svetlana Kuznetsova in the third round. Richard Gasquet withdrew from his match against Donald Young with a fever and sore throat, and Guillermo Cañas was another casualty. British favorite Andy Murray and James Blake overcame five-set thrillers to advance, while there was also a big upset in the men's doubles draw as defending champions Martin Damm and Leander Paes crashed out. Tomáš Berdych, Tommy Haas, Nikolay Davydenko, Nadia Petrova, Anna Chakvetadze, Patty Schnyder and Nicole Vaidišová were other players to advance.

- Seeded players out: Richard Gasquet (illness; withdrew), Guillermo Cañas, Katarina Srebotnik, Francesca Schiavone, Michaëlla Krajicek
- Doubles seeds out: Martin Damm / Leander Paes; Lisa Raymond / Nenad Zimonjić; Elena Likhovtseva / Tiantian Sun

==== Day 5 ====
Radek Štěpánek and Novak Djokovic battled their match for hours, never letting a set go be won with a six-an eventual scoreline that Djokovic can boast of 6–7, 7–6, 5–7, 7–5, 7–6. Mardy Fish saved match points only to lose despite being a break up in the final set to Tommy Robredo and Agustín Calleri and Philipp Kohlschreiber both pulled off upsets taking out Lleyton Hewitt and Mikhail Youzhny. In the women's draw, heavy favorites Justine Henin, Jelena Janković, Ana Ivanovic and Serena and Venus Williams all advanced to the fourth round. They were joined there by Marion Bartoli, Dinara Safina and surprise victor Sybille Bammer who upset Elena Dementieva. The doubles court saw the biggest upset of the tournament when Maria Elena Camerin and Gisela Dulko beat top seeds Cara Black and Liezel Huber 1–6, 7–6(2), 6–2 after being down 6–1, 3–1.

- Seeded players out: Mikhail Youzhny, Lleyton Hewitt, Marat Safin, Jürgen Melzer, Elena Dementieva, Alona Bondarenko, Lucie Šafářová, Vera Zvonareva
- Doubles seeds out: Eric Butorac / Jamie Murray, Arnaud Clément / Michaël Llodra; Shuai Peng / Zi Yan, Cara Black / Liezel Huber; Elena Likhovtseva / Daniel Nestor

==== Day 6 ====
draw included Nadia Petrova, Patty Schnyder and Martina Hingis who all lost to promising teenagers in Ágnes Szávay, Tamira Paszek and Victoria Azarenka. Shahar Pe'er also beat the thirteenth seed Nicole Vaidišová. Otherwise favorites like Andy Roddick, Anna Chakvetadze, James Blake, Nikolay Davydenko, Roger Federer, Svetlana Kuznetsova, Tomáš Berdych and Tommy Haas all went through to the fourth round. In the men's draw, there was only one upset as the last British player left in the singles draw, Andy Murray, crashed out to Lee Hyung-taik in four sets.

- Seeded players out: Andy Murray, Nicolás Almagro, Maria Sharapova, Nadia Petrova, Patty Schnyder, Nicole Vaidišová, Martina Hingis, Sania Mirza, Anabel Medina Garrigues
- Doubles seeds out: Mariusz Fyrstenberg / Marcin Matkowski, Mahesh Bhupathi / Nenad Zimonjić, František Čermák / Leoš Friedl; Květa Peschke / Martin Damm

==== Day 7 ====
The men's fourth round line-up was completed and the women's quarterfinal began to take shape. Carlos Moyà, David Ferrer, Juan Mónaco, Novak Djokovic and Rafael Nadal all expectedly made it through in the men's bottom half. Ernests Gulbis became the first Latvian player to make the fourth round of the US Open when he upset eighth seed Tommy Robredo in straight sets and Juan Ignacio Chela got his first ever victory over Ivan Ljubičić. Stanislas Wawrinka also continued his run. In the first of the women's fourth round matches, Justine Henin crushed an erratic Dinara Safina, Serena and Venus Williams both beat dangerous opponents in Marion Bartoli and Ana Ivanovic and Jelena Janković needed three sets to get past Austrian Sybille Bammer before eventually prevailing 6–4, 4–6, 6–1.

- Seeded players out: Tommy Robredo, Ivan Ljubičić, David Nalbandian, Ana Ivanovic, Marion Bartoli, Dinara Safina, Sybille Bammer
- Doubles seeds out: Jeff Coetzee / Rogier Wassen, Jonathan Erlich / Andy Ram, Jonas Björkman / Max Mirnyi; Alicia Molik / Mara Santangelo, Vania King / Émilie Loit, Anabel Medina Garrigues / Virginia Ruano Pascual; Chia-Jung Chuang / Jonathan Erlich, Alicia Molik / Bob Bryan

==== Day 8 ====
Home favorite James Blake was the biggest seed to fall as the quarter-final draw was completed on the women's side. Shahar Pe'er put a stop to Agnieszka Radwańska's run, but Julia Vakulenko was unable to halt Ágnes Szávay, a player who had previously never gone past the second round of a grand slam. Russians Svetlana Kuznetsova and Anna Chakvetadze progressed with relative ease. James Blake threw three match points in his thriller with Tommy Haas, unable to repeat the previous year's showing of a quarterfinal. Andy Roddick was leading when a second opponent, Tomáš Berdych, retired on him in a week. Roger Federer lost the first set but ultimately had a comfortable victory and Nikolay Davydenko progressed, still the only player on the men's side not to drop a set. In men's doubles, the top seeded Bryan brothers were upset by tenth-seeded Simon Aspelin and Julian Knowle 7–5, 6–4. It was Aspelin's first time in a Grand Slam semifinal and Knowle's second. In women's doubles, second-seeded Lisa Raymond and Samantha Stosur were shocked by sixteenth-seeded Bethanie Mattek and Sania Mirza 2–6, 7–5, 7–5.

- Seeded players out: James Blake, Tomáš Berdych (illness; retired), Agnieszka Radwańska
- Doubles seeds out: Bob Bryan / Mike Bryan; Lisa Raymond / Samantha Stosur, Tathiana Garbin / Shahar Pe'er

==== Day 9 ====
Novak Djokovic needed four sets to overcome Juan Mónaco after having a match point in the third set, and set up a meeting with Carlos Moyà who beat Latvian Ernests Gulbis. Juan Ignacio Chela survived unseeded Stanislas Wawrinka in five sets to advance to the quarterfinals. Number one Justine Henin beat Serena Williams to make the women's semifinals, and in a match that ended at 1:50 a.m. local time, David Ferrer caused the biggest upset in the men's draw so far by taking out second-seeded fellow Spaniard Rafael Nadal in a thrilling four-set match.

- Seeded players out: Rafael Nadal, Juan Mónaco, Serena Williams
- Doubles seeds out: Mark Knowles / Daniel Nestor; Bethanie Mattek / Sania Mirza; Zi Yan / Mark Knowles

==== Day 10 ====
The men's semifinals began to take shape as Roger Federer overcame Andy Roddick in a thrilling 7–6, 7–6, 6–2 encounter to move through to the semifinals, where he will face Russian Nikolay Davydenko who beat Tommy Haas earlier in the day, also in straight sets. In the women's draw, the semifinal line-up was complete with three matches taking the court. Anna Chakvetadze was first, cruising past Shahar Pe'er 6–4, 6–1, and will meet compatriot Svetlana Kuznetsova in the last four for a place in the final. In the women's night match, Venus Williams beat Jelena Janković in a thrilling encounter, with Venus having to come from a set down to eventually win 4–6, 6–1, 7–6.

- Seeded players out: Andy Roddick, Tommy Haas, Jelena Janković, Shahar Pe'er
- Doubles seeds out: Paul Hanley / Kevin Ullyett; Corina Morariu / Meghann Shaughnessy, Katarina Srebotnik / Ai Sugiyama

==== Day 11 ====
David Ferrer continued his scintillating run, reaching his first Grand Slam semi-final by defeating Juan Ignacio Chela 6–2, 6–3, 7–5. The final men's quarterfinal didn't last much longer, with Novak Djokovic holding his nerve to beat Carlos Moyà 6–4, 7–6 (7), 6–1 and reach his third Grand Slam semi-final of the year. The mixed doubles competition was completed, with Belarusians Max Mirnyi and Victoria Azarenka overcoming Meghann Shaughnessy and Leander Paes 6–4, 7–6 (6).

- Seeded players out: Carlos Moyà, Juan Ignacio Chela
- Doubles seeds out: Ágnes Szávay / Vladimíra Uhlířová, Květa Peschke / Rennae Stubbs

==== Day 12 ====
Justine Henin came through in straight sets and defeated the Williams sisters in the same tournament. Only Martina Hingis has done this. Henin and Williams battled a classic, while Anna Chakvetadze at first dominated by errors of Svetlana Kuznetsova, but then Chakvetadze had errors and Kuznetsova got by 3–6, 6–1, 6–1.

- Seeded players out: Anna Chakvetadze, Venus Williams
- Doubles seeds out: Lukáš Dlouhý / Pavel Vízner

==== Day 13 ====
Justine Henin cruised to her second US Open championship, crushing Svetlana Kuznetsova 6–1, 6–3 to win the title. Esther Vergeer once again won a doubles final, this time alongside Jiske Griffioen. Shingo Kunieda and Satoshi Saida won the Wheelchair Men's Doubles final over Robin Ammerlaan and Michaël Jeremiasz. In juniors competition, Jonathan Eysseric and Jérôme Inzerillo defeated Grigor Dimitrov and Vasek Pospisil to win the title, while Ksenia Milevskaya and Urszula Radwańska dominated their final against Oksana Kalashnikova and Ksenia Lykina.

- Seeded players out: Nikolay Davydenko, David Ferrer, Svetlana Kuznetsova

==== Day 14 ====
Roger Federer won for the fourth consecutive year to bring his overall Grand Slam singles titles tally to twelve.

- Seeded players out: Novak Djokovic
- Doubles seeds out: Yung-Jan Chan / Chia-Jung Chuang

== Seniors ==
=== Men's singles ===
(Switzerland) Roger Federer defeated (Serbia) Novak Djokovic, 7–6^{(7–4),} 7–6^{(7–2)}, 6–4

- It was Federer's 6th title of the year, and his 51st overall. It was his 12th career Grand Slam title, and his 4th (consecutive) at the US Open.

=== Women's singles ===
(Belgium) Justine Henin defeated (Russia) Svetlana Kuznetsova, 6–1, 6–3

- It was Henin's 7th title of the year, and her 36th overall. It was her 7th (and last) career Grand Slam title, and her 2nd US Open title.

=== Men's doubles ===
(Sweden) Simon Aspelin / (Austria) Julian Knowle defeated (Czech Republic) Lukáš Dlouhý / (Czech Republic) Pavel Vízner, 7–5, 6–4

- Aspelin and Knowle both won their first Grand Slam, defeating top seeds Bob and Mike Bryan en route.

=== Women's doubles ===
(France) Nathalie Dechy / (Russia) Dinara Safina defeated (Chinese Taipei) Chan Yung-jan / (Chinese Taipei) Chuang Chia-jung, 6–4, 6–2

- Dechy and Safina played in last year's doubles finals, however, Dechy was the winner while Safina lost in the final.

=== Mixed doubles ===
(Belarus) Victoria Azarenka / (Belarus) Max Mirnyi defeated (United States) Meghann Shaughnessy / (India) Leander Paes, 6–4, 7–6^{(8–6)}

• It was Azarenka's 1st career Grand Slam mixed doubles title.
• It was Mirnyi's 3rd career Grand Slam mixed doubles title and his 2nd at the US Open.

== Juniors ==
=== Boys' singles ===
(Lithuania) Ričardas Berankis defeated (Poland) Jerzy Janowicz, 6–3, 6–4

=== Girls' singles ===
(Slovakia) Kristína Kučová defeated (Poland) Urszula Radwańska, 6–3, 1–6, 7–6(4)

=== Boys' doubles ===
(France) Jonathan Eysseric / (France) Jérôme Inzerillo defeated (Bulgaria) Grigor Dimitrov / (Canada) Vasek Pospisil, 6–2, 6–4

=== Girls' doubles ===
(Belarus) Ksenia Milevskaya / (Poland) Urszula Radwańska defeated (Georgia (country)) Oksana Kalashnikova / (Russia) Ksenia Lykina, 6–1, 6–2

== Wheelchair ==
=== Wheelchair men's singles ===
(Japan) Shingo Kunieda defeated (Netherlands) Robin Ammerlaan, 6–2, 6–2

=== Wheelchair women's singles ===
(Netherlands) Esther Vergeer defeated (France) Florence Gravellier, 6–3, 6–1

=== Wheelchair men's doubles ===
(Japan) Shingo Kunieda / (Japan) Satoshi Saida defeated (Netherlands) Robin Ammerlaan / (France) Michaël Jeremiasz, 6–3, 6–2

=== Wheelchair women's doubles ===
(Netherlands) Jiske Griffioen / (Netherlands) Esther Vergeer defeated (Netherlands) Korie Homan / (Netherlands) Sharon Walraven, 6–1, 6–1

=== Wheelchair quad singles ===
(United Kingdom) Peter Norfolk def (United States) David Wagner, 7–6(5), 6–2

=== Wheelchair quad doubles ===
(United States) Nick Taylor / (United States) David Wagner defeated (Canada) Sarah Hunter / (United Kingdom) Peter Norfolk, 6–1, 4–6, 6–0

== Legends ==
=== Men's champions invitational ===
(United States) Todd Martin

=== Women's champions invitational ===
(Spain) Conchita Martínez and (Czech Republic) Jana Novotná

=== Mixed champions invitational ===
Round robin 1: (Belarus) Natasha Zvereva / (Ecuador) Andrés Gómez
Round robin 2: (United States) Anne Smith / (United States) Stan Smith

== Seeds ==
The seeded players are listed below. Notably, it was the first time in 11 years that the two top seeded players, and the two world number one singles players, won the US Open Singles Championships (the last previous time had been when Pete Sampras and Steffi Graf won in 1996).

=== Men's singles ===
1. (Switzerland) Roger Federer (champion)
2. (Spain) Rafael Nadal (4th round, lost to David Ferrer)
3. (Serbia) Novak Djokovic, (finals, lost to Roger Federer)
4. (Russia) Nikolay Davydenko, (semifinals, lost to Roger Federer)
5. (United States) Andy Roddick, (quarterfinals, lost to Roger Federer)
6. (United States) James Blake, (4th round, lost to Tommy Haas)
7. (Chile) Fernando González, (1st round, lost to Teymuraz Gabashvili)
8. (Spain) Tommy Robredo, (3rd round, lost to Ernests Gulbis)
9. (Czech Republic) Tomáš Berdych, (4th round, retired to Andy Roddick)
10. (Germany) Tommy Haas, (quarterfinals, lost to Nikolay Davydenko)
11. (Russia) Mikhail Youzhny, (2nd round, lost to Philipp Kohlschreiber)
12. (Croatia) Ivan Ljubičić, (3rd round, lost to Juan Ignacio Chela)
13. (France) Richard Gasquet, (2nd round, lost by walkover to Donald Young)
14. (Argentina) Guillermo Cañas, (2nd round, lost to Lee Hyung-taik)
15. (Spain) David Ferrer, (semifinals, lost to Novak Djokovic)
16. (Australia) Lleyton Hewitt, (2nd round, lost to Agustín Calleri)
17. (Spain) Carlos Moyà, (quarterfinals, lost to Novak Djokovic)
18. (Cyprus) Marcos Baghdatis, (1st round, lost to Max Mirnyi)
19. (United Kingdom) Andy Murray, (3rd round, lost to Lee Hyung-taik)
20. (Argentina) Juan Ignacio Chela, (quarterfinals, lost to David Ferrer)
21. (Spain) Juan Carlos Ferrero, (1st round, lost to Feliciano López)
22. (France) Paul-Henri Mathieu, (1st round, lost to Fernando Verdasco)
23. (Argentina) Juan Mónaco, (4th round, lost to Novak Djokovic)
24. (Argentina) David Nalbandian, (3rd round, lost to David Ferrer)
25. (Russia) Marat Safin, (2nd round, lost to Stanislas Wawrinka)
26. (Finland) Jarkko Nieminen, (1st round, lost to John Isner)
27. (Russia) Dmitry Tursunov, (1st round, lost to Tim Henman)
28. (Spain) Nicolás Almagro, (3rd round, lost to Nikolay Davydenko)
29. (Italy) Filippo Volandri, (1st round, lost to Michaël Llodra)
30. (Italy) Potito Starace, (1st round, lost to Ernests Gulbis)
31. (Austria) Jürgen Melzer, (2nd round, lost to Juan Martín del Potro)
32. (Croatia) Ivo Karlović, (1st round, lost to Arnaud Clément)

=== Women's singles ===
1. (Belgium) Justine Henin (champion)
2. (Russia) Maria Sharapova (defending champion, 3rd round, lost to Agnieszka Radwańska)
3. (Serbia) Jelena Janković, (quarterfinals, lost to Venus Williams)
4. (Russia) Svetlana Kuznetsova, (finals, lost to Justine Henin)
5. (Serbia) Ana Ivanovic, (4th round, lost to Venus Williams)
6. (Russia) Anna Chakvetadze, (semifinals, lost to Svetlana Kuznetsova)
7. (Russia) Nadia Petrova, (3rd round, lost to Ágnes Szávay)
8. (United States) Serena Williams, (quarterfinals, lost to Justine Henin)
9. (Slovakia) Daniela Hantuchová, (1st round, lost to Julia Vakulenko)
10. (France) Marion Bartoli, (4th round, lost to Serena Williams)
11. (Switzerland) Patty Schnyder, (3rd round, lost to Tamira Paszek)
12. (United States) Venus Williams (semifinals, lost to Justine Henin)
13. (Czech Republic) Nicole Vaidišová, (3rd round, lost to Shahar Pe'er)
14. (Russia) Elena Dementieva, (3rd round, lost to Sybille Bammer)
15. (Russia) Dinara Safina, (4th round, lost to Justine Henin)
16. (Switzerland) Martina Hingis, (3rd round, lost to Victoria Azarenka)
17. (France) Tatiana Golovin, (1st round, lost to Ahsha Rolle)
18. (Israel) Shahar Pe'er, (quarterfinals, lost to Anna Chakvetadze)
19. (Austria) Sybille Bammer, (4th round, lost to Jelena Janković)
20. (Czech Republic) Lucie Šafářová, (3rd round, lost to Marion Bartoli)
21. (Ukraine) Alona Bondarenko, (3rd round, lost to Venus Williams)
22. (Slovenia) Katarina Srebotnik, (2nd round, lost to Maria Kirilenko)
23. (Italy) Tathiana Garbin, (1st round, lost to Dominika Cibulková)
24. (Italy) Francesca Schiavone, (2nd round, lost to Tamira Paszek)
25. (Italy) Mara Santangelo, (1st round, lost to Vera Dushevina)
26. (India) Sania Mirza, (3rd round, lost to Anna Chakvetadze)
27. (Russia) Vera Zvonareva, (3rd round, lost to Serena Williams)
28. (Japan) Ai Sugiyama, (2nd round, lost to Ekaterina Makarova)
29. (Australia) Samantha Stosur, (1st round, lost to Alizé Cornet)
30. (Poland) Agnieszka Radwańska, (4th round, lost to Shahar Pe'er)
31. (Spain) Anabel Medina Garrigues, (3rd round, lost to Svetlana Kuznetsova)
32. (Netherlands) Michaëlla Krajicek, (2nd round, lost to Ágnes Szávay)

== Wild card entries ==
Below are the lists of the wild card awardees entering in the main draws.

=== Men's singles ===
1. (United States) John Isner
2. (Australia) Alun Jones
3. (United States) Alex Kuznetsov
4. (United States) Jesse Levine
5. (United States) Michael McClune
6. (United States) Wayne Odesnik
7. (United States) Ryan Sweeting
8. (United States) Donald Young

=== Women's singles ===
1. (United States) Lauren Albanese
2. (United States) Madison Brengle
3. (United States) Audra Cohen
4. (United States) Alexa Glatch
5. (United States) Jamea Jackson
6. (Australia) Jessica Moore
7. (United States) Ahsha Rolle
8. (United States) Ashley Weinhold

=== Men's doubles ===
1. (United States) Kellen Damico / (United States) Nathaniel Schnugg
2. (United States) Robby Ginepri / (Brazil) Gustavo Kuerten
3. (United States) John Isner / (United States) Scott Oudsema
4. (United States) Scoville Jenkins / (United States) Phillip Simmonds
5. (United States) Robert Kendrick / (United States) Sam Querrey
6. (United States) Alex Kuznetsov / (United States) Jesse Levine
7. (United States) Rajeev Ram / (United States) Donald Young

=== Women's' doubles ===
1. (United States) Sara Anundsen / (United States) Jenna Long
2. (United States) Hilary Barte / (United States) Alexandra Mueller
3. (United States) Madison Brengle / (United States) Ashley Weinhold
4. (United States) Alexa Glatch / (United States) Abigail Spears
5. (United States) Jamie Hampton / (United States) Melanie Oudin
6. (United States) Angela Haynes / (United States) Ahsha Rolle
7. (United States) Jamea Jackson / (United States) Chanda Rubin

=== Mixed doubles ===
1. (United States) Jill Craybas / (United States) Bobby Reynolds
2. (United States) Alexa Glatch / (United States) Scoville Jenkins
3. (United States) Ashley Harkleroad / (United States) Justin Gimelstob
4. (United States) Vania King / (United States) Vince Spadea
5. (United States) Corina Morariu / (United States) Amer Delić
6. (United States) Ashley Weinhold / (United States) Ryan Sweeting

== Qualifier entries ==
Men's Singles

Main article: 2007 US Open – Men's singles qualifying
1. (Canada) Frank Dancevic
2. (Mexico) Bruno Echagaray
3. (Romania) Andrei Pavel
4. (Germany) Alexander Waske
5. (Belgium) Steve Darcis
6. (United States) Scoville Jenkins
7. (Germany) Rainer Schüttler
8. (Uruguay) Pablo Cuevas
9. (South Africa) Rik de Voest
10. (Germany) Dominik Meffert
11. (Israel) Dudi Sela
12. (Germany) Björn Phau
13. (Chile) Paul Capdeville
14. (France) Thierry Ascione
15. (Germany) Philipp Petzschner
16. (Poland) Michał Przysiężny

The following players received entry as lucky losers:

1. (United States) Bobby Reynolds
2. (Netherlands) Robin Haase

Women's Singles

Main article: 2007 US Open – Women's singles qualifying
1. (Ukraine) Tatiana Perebiynis
2. (China) Yan Zi
3. (France) Alizé Cornet
4. (Czech Republic) Petra Cetkovská
5. (Russia) Alina Jidkova
6. (Germany) Julia Görges
7. (France) Pauline Parmentier
8. (France) Olivia Sanchez
9. (Slovenia) Andreja Klepač
10. (Switzerland) Emmanuelle Gagliardi
11. (Germany) Sandra Klösel
12. (Argentina) Jorgelina Cravero
13. (Hungary) Kira Nagy
14. (Russia) Ekaterina Makarova
15. (Czech Republic) Renata Voráčová
16. (Bulgaria) Tsvetana Pironkova

== Protected ranking ==
The following players were accepted directly into the main draw using a protected ranking:

Men's Singles

- (United States) Justin Gimelstob
- (Germany) Nicolas Kiefer

Women's Singles

- (South Korea) Cho Yoon-jeong

== Withdrawals ==
=== Men's singles ===
- (Croatia) Mario Ančić → replaced by (Netherlands) Robin Haase
- (Sweden) Joachim Johansson → replaced by (France) Nicolas Devilder
- (France) Gaël Monfils → replaced by (United States) Bobby Reynolds
- (Sweden) Robin Söderling → replaced by (Thailand) Danai Udomchoke
- (Thailand) Paradorn Srichaphan → replaced by (United States) Robert Kendrick

=== Women's singles ===
- (Russia) Vasilisa Bardina → replaced by (South Korea) Cho Yoon-jeong
- (China) Li Na → replaced by (France) Mathilde Johansson
- (France) Amélie Mauresmo → replaced by (Belarus) Olga Govortsova
- (Venezuela) Milagros Sequera → replaced by (Germany) Julia Schruff
- (China) Zheng Jie → replaced by (Germany) Andrea Petkovic

== Media coverage ==
Coverage of the 2007 US Open are as follows:

Television networks

- Australia – Fox Sports (live)
- Australia – Nine Network (finals only)
- Bosnia and Herzegovina – BHRT (all live)
- Brazil – ESPN Latin America, ESPN Brasil and SporTV2 (all live)
- China – China Central Television (live)
- Europe – Eurosport (live)
- Middle East – ART Sports (live)
- India – TEN Sports (live)
- Latin America – ESPN Latin America, ESPN Más and ESPN Dos (all live)
- Pakistan – STAR Sports (live)
- Philippines – Balls (live; began test broadcast)
- Serbia – RTS (live)
- Singapore – SuperSports (live)
- United Kingdom – British Eurosport (live)
- United Kingdom – Sky Sports (live)
- United States – CBS Sports (live)
- United States – CNBC (Monday night, September 3 Only)
- United States – Universal HD (live, HD Simulcast of USA Network and CNBC)
- United States – USA Network (live)

Radio

- Canada – XM Sports Nation
- United Kingdom – BBC Radio 5 Live
- United States – XM Sports Nation

Preceded by 2007 Wimbledon Championships	Grand Slams	Succeeded by 2008 Australian Open
