= War Ready (album) =

Studio album by Rich Amiri
- Released: December 6, 2024
- Genres: Hip-hop, trap, rage
- Length: 39:58
- Labels: Internet Money; 10K Projects
- Producers: Taz Taylor; Rio Leyva; Talk2primo; Twinterrors; Rich Amiri; Noah Mejia; Matt Cohn; Synthetic; Akachi; Sharkboy; Benji Miller; Bhristo; Bugz Ronin; Fendii

Rich Amiri chronology
Ghetto Fabulous (2023)	War Ready (2024)	Grit & Grace (2025)

Singles from War Ready
- 1. "Keep It Cool" Released: August 15, 2024; 2. "Count My Bandz" Released: September 20, 2024

War Ready (stylized in all caps) is the fourth studio album by American rapper Rich Amiri. It was released on December 6, 2024, through Internet Money and 10K Projects. War Ready serves as a follow-up to his third studio album Ghetto Fabolous (2023). The album features a sole guest appearance from OsamaSon, while the album's production was handled by Policard himself alongside multiple record producers. It would be promoted by two singles: "Keep It Cool" and "Count My Bandz", with the former debuting at number 32 on the New Zealand Hot Singles chart.

== Background and recording ==
Three versions of the album were created, with Amiri calling them "three completely different versions, with completely different tracks.” Amiri would start working on the first following the successful release of his third studio album Ghetto Fabulous (2023). In 2024, Amiri made the XXL Freshmen Class list, later discussing his improvement with his "craft" in an interview with the publication:

“I don’t think there’s anybody making what I’m going to release, I know I’ve taken about a half-year break where I only had one releases, but within the half-year, I’ve been in this studio every single day working on my craft, and I just don’t think [...] I don’t think anybody in my lane or around my age, like, period, is going to be coming how I’m coming.”

He would later start recording new material for War Ready in 2024. For the visualizers of the songs in the album, Amiri decided to include an American flag burning in the background, which was thought to be political. In a press release, when asked about War Ready, Amiri stated: “So, I feel like what ‘war ready’ means to me is like, internally being ready to combat that, you know? Just combat whatever life may throw my way, whether or not I’m prepared for it. There was just a time when, every time I would go on the internet and see my name it was something that was frustrating to me.”

== Composition ==
War Ready consists of eighteen tracks that clock out at around 38 minutes. RapReview's Juon Steve commented on the runtime, expressing that "most of his songs are two minutes long and a few are even shorter than that." "That's It" features a burbling synthline and "is smoother and hookier than many of the "bombastic" tracks on War Ready, while "U Want That" explores Amiri questioning his life choices. Vivian Medithi of The Fader felt that the album "burrows" into rage rap.

== Release and promotion ==
The album would be announced by Amiri changing his Instagram bio to "ready4war". On April 5, 2024, Amiri dropped "Madonna & Rihanna" as promotion following the album's announcement. "Out My Mind" would later release on June 28. On August 15, 2024, Amiri released the album's lead single, "Keep It Cool", which received critical acclaim, and peaked at number 32 on the New Zealand Hot Singles chart. Followed by the second and final single "Count My Bandz" on September 20, 2024. War Ready would drop on December 6, 2024, through 10K Projects and Internet Money Records.

== Critical reception ==
Professional ratings
Review scores
Source	Rating
RapReviews	7/10

Writing for HotNewHipHop, Elias Andrews wrote "the album lives up to its title with a batch of songs that are energetic, propulsive, and filled with confrontational bars." Steve Juon of RapReviews said "I can’t help but notice Elijah Policard is more than surface deep. I can’t tell you if that’s inches or miles. In a genre filled with trapping, pill popping and dead bodies though, I sense that Amiri is more thoughtful about what he’s saying and what message he wants to convey than some of his peers." The Fader's Vivian Medithi felt "Amiri leans towards the subgenre's more laidback melodicism, deploying a rich baritone to expansive effect." Also discussing "The beats still bring plenty of boom, but they're not so spiky, more easily digestible."
