= Yuke (rapper) =

American rapper (born 2007 or 2008)

- Born: Yandel Sosa; 2007 or 2008 (age 18–19); New York City, U.S.
- Genres: Jerk; experimental hip-hop; cloud rap; plugg
- Occupations: Musician; rapper; singer; record producer
- Years active: 2020–present
- Member of: Najma
- Formerly of: #back

Yandel Sosa, known professionally as Yuke (stylized in all lowercase), is an American rapper and record producer. He has collaborated with artists such as Jaydes. In 2024, he released his debut album Trap Finesse Cult. Pitchfork selected his song "Ian Goin" for their list of "2024's Songs of the Summer".

== Life and career ==
Yandel Sosa was born in New York City to Dominican parents. In 2024, Sosa released his debut album Trap Finesse Cult, which, according to Jordan Darville of The Fader, "experiment[s] with piercing dissonance and glazed flows". Darville added that Sosa had drawn influence from acts such as Glo Gang, Goth Money Records, and the "modern SoundCloud rap underground." The song "Finesse Cult Anthem" featured American rapper Jaydes.

Pitchfork selected Sosa's 2024 single "Ian Goin" as contender for the song of the summer. Music journalist Kieran Press-Reynolds labelled it "one of 2024's Songs of the Summer", writing: "This is the logical excruciating endpoint of the 'terror plugg' style, a 75-second jolt of producer Karakuli's maddening beat-screeches". The single was credited with spearheading a wave of plugg music showcasing aggressive 808s, which Press-Reynolds labeled "extremo-plugg".

== Discography ==
=== Albums ===
Title	Album details
Trap Finesse Cult	Released: 2024; Label: Self-released; Format: Digital download, streaming
Mascara	Released: 2024; Label: Self-released; Format: Digital download, streaming
Cheetah World	Released: 2024; Label: Self-released; Format: Digital download, streaming
Miss Misery	Released: 2025; Label: Self-released; Format: Digital download, streaming
Cheetah World 2	Released: 2025; Label: Self-released; Format: Digital download, streaming
Cheetah World 3	Released: 2026; Label: Self-released; Format: Digital download, streaming

=== Mixtapes ===
Title	Mixtape details
Sprain	Released: 2023; Label: Self-released; Format: Digital download, streaming

=== EPs ===
Title	EP details
Love	Released: 2021; Label: Self-released; Format: Digital download, streaming
Winter (⛄)	Released: 2023; Label: Self-released; Format: Digital download, streaming
Beel	Released: 2023; Label: Self-released; Format: Digital download, streaming
Bx Baby	Released: 2023; Label: Self-released; Format: Digital download, streaming
Bonus 4 My Cult	Released: 2024; Label: Self-released; Format: Digital download, streaming
6 Cheetahs 1 Dove 6 Owls	Released: 2024; Label: Self-released; Format: Digital download, streaming
Death Parade.. Throw Your Hands Up \(_ _ )/ \(x X )/	Released: 2024; Label: Self-released; Format: Digital download, streaming
Cheetah World (Deluxe)	Released: 2024; Label: Self-released; Format: Digital download, streaming
B4 Miss Misery :(	Released: 2025; Label: Self-released; Format: Digital download, streaming
Finesse Angel	Released: 2025; Collaborators: Yuke & Wifiskeleton; Label: Self-released; Format: Digital download, streaming
Prop🩸's Reasons Why (as Propblood)	Released: 2025; Label: Self-released; Format: Digital download, streaming
Teenage Drugs (as Propblood)	Released: 2026; Label: Self-released; Format: Digital download, streaming
B4 Cheetah World 3	Released: 2026; Label: Self-released; Format: Digital download, streaming
