= Wifiskeleton =

American musician (2003–2025)

- Wifiskeleton in 2022
- Born: Jeremiah Justin Simms; July 24, 2003; Atlanta, Georgia, US
- Died: May 5, 2025 (aged 21); Miami, Florida, US
- Occupations: Musician; YouTuber
- Years active: Late 2010s–2025
- Musical career
- Also known as: Fuxkcy; Secretsaturdays; *67
- Genres: Alternative pop; SoundCloud rap; SoundCloud indie
- Labels: 9th St.; Hallwood
- Formerly of: GothAngelz

YouTube information
- Channels: CyrusIsOk (deactivated)
- Years active: 2018–2023
- Genre: Commentary
- Subscribers: 1.47 million
- Views: 129 million

Jeremiah Justin Simms (July 24, 2003 – May 5, 2025), known professionally as Wifiskeleton (stylized in all lowercase), was an American musician and YouTuber. He was a co-founder of the underground collective GothAngelz.

Born in Atlanta, Georgia, Wifiskeleton initially gained popularity through a commentary YouTube channel under the name "Cyrus" in the late 2010s. Around this time, he made music as "Fuxkcy", "Secretsaturdays", and "*67". In 2022, he shifted to rock music under the name "Wifiskeleton". Eventually, he became a leading figure in SoundCloud indie.

In 2025, Wifiskeleton died due to a suspected drug overdose, which led to his single "Nope Your Too Late I Already Died" going viral worldwide and posthumously earning him over eight million monthly listeners on Spotify. The song was certified platinum by the Recording Industry Association of America, and reached number 91 on the US Billboard Hot 100. It also appeared on several other music charts around the world.

== Life and career ==
Jeremiah Justin Simms was born on July 24, 2003, in Atlanta, Georgia. In a 2024 Instagram Live interview, he said he moved out of his parents' house at age 16. He also said he was expelled from high school. (Note: Simms, Jeremiah (April 24, 2024). No title (Instagram Live). Interviewed by gage.hob. "gage.hob: You said you moved out at 16. How was that for you? Wifiskeleton: In the start, it was scary as fuck, man ... Most of the time I did have friends, you know, especially in ninth grade and shit, before I did get kicked out.") In the late 2010s, Wifiskeleton gained popularity through a YouTube channel under the name "Cyrus". The channel gave bitter and direct commentary about other videos. He began many musical aliases around this time, including "Fuxkcy" and "Secretsaturdays". He then made hyperpop and rap music under the alias "*67". His work gained attention on streaming platforms and social media during the COVID-19 pandemic.

In 2022, he began making music under the name "Wifiskeleton", and co-founded the underground collective GothAngelz. Compared to *67, he used the alias to experiment with a less digital rock sound. As Wifiskeleton, he released new music prolifically, but would delete many of his songs from streaming services.

Wifiskeleton released his debut mixtape, Lovefool, in June 2024, followed by Suburban Daredevil in October. Both mixtapes were recorded on Temple University's campus with the help of his manager, Joseph Conallen. AllMusic called Suburban Daredevil "more fully realized and more carefully produced" compared to his previous works. It featured the single "Nope Your Too Late I Already Died", which went viral on TikTok and became his first song to chart, debuting and peaking at number 91 on the Billboard Hot 100. Streams for the song surged after his death, and he gained over eight million monthly listeners on Spotify. In April 2025, he released his final mixtape, titled Pony.

== Death ==
On May 5, 2025, Wifiskeleton died in Miami, due to a suspected drug overdose. The report of his death was initially shared by fellow GothAngelz member Witchbox in the collective's Discord server, stating that he was "already cold" when police and medics arrived. His death was further confirmed by close friend and collaborator Yuke on social media. On the day before he died, he appeared on an Instagram livestream in which he made statements indicating suicidal intent: "Pull up and kill me, it's the time to do it. If you want to get a flick with me, it's the time to do it. I'm going to overdose tonight and kill myself". His death came weeks before scheduled performances in New York City and Los Angeles. Following the announcement of his death, many of Wifiskeleton's friends and fellow artists paid tribute to him on social media. On May 7, 2025, Hallwood Recordings and 9th St. Records confirmed Wifiskeleton's death in a statement reported by Billboard, describing him as "a rare soul whose art, energy and presence moved so many".

== Artistry and legacy ==
Wifiskeleton's songs incorporated elements of alternative pop, SoundCloud rap, and hyperpop. He was also prominent in the subgenre sigilkore. He referred to Rivers Cuomo and Mac DeMarco as his biggest musical influences. He also said he was partially inspired by Tame Impala. According to AllMusic, his lyrics often explored "extremely depressive themes of death, despair, self-harm, and other joyless topics". Kieran Press-Reynolds of Pitchfork said Wifiskeleton became a stylistic reference point in what was dubbed a "new wave of SoundCloud indie rock". He was credited with popularizing a style of "depressive droning over looped guitar beats". Artist Ayowitty stated that a new wave of musicians were replicating Wifiskeleton's sound to the point of cliché, while Bunii added that artists imitating Wifiskeleton's sound were popular across TikTok. In March 2026, Vivian Medithi of The Fader described Wifiskeleton as a major figure in the SoundCloud indie scene.

== Discography ==
=== Compilation albums ===
List of compilation albums, with year released and selected details
Title	Details
Fuck National Boyfriend Day	Released: October 20, 2023; Label: 9th St. / Hallwood; Formats: Digital download, streaming
I Fucking Hate Fiona Gallagher	Released: January 26, 2024; Label: 9th St. / Hallwood; Formats: Digital download, streaming

=== Mixtapes ===
List of mixtapes, with selected chart positions
Title	Details	Peak chart positions
Title	Details	LTU
Lovefool	Released: June 28, 2024; Label: 9th St. / Hallwood; Formats: Digital download, streaming	—
Suburban Daredevil	Released: October 22, 2024; Label: 9th St. / Hallwood; Formats: Digital download, streaming	31
Pony	Released: April 18, 2025; Label: 9th St. / Hallwood; Formats: Digital download, streaming	—
"—" denotes a recording that did not chart or was not released in that territory.

=== Charted and certified songs ===
List of songs, with selected chart positions and certifications, showing year released and originating album
Title	Year	Peak chart positions							Certifications	Album
Title	Year	US	US Alt	CAN	IRE	LTU	UK	WW	Certifications	Album
"Nope Your Too Late I Already Died" (with I Wanna Be a Jack-o-Lantern)	2024	91	17	70	72	17	72	67	RIAA: Platinum; BPI: Silver	Suburban Daredevil

== See also ==
- List of YouTubers
- List of 2025 deaths in popular music
