= One Call (Rich Amiri song) =

2023 single by Rich Amiri

Single by Rich Amiri

from the album Ghetto Fabulous
- Released: November 3, 2023
- Length: 2:01
- Label: Internet Money; 10K
- Songwriters: Elijah Policard; Rio Leyva; Zachary Cassell
- Producers: Leyva; Zuko

Rich Amiri singles chronology
"Codeine Crazy" (2023)	"One Call" (2023)

Music video
- "One Call" on YouTube

"One Call" is a song by American rapper Rich Amiri, released on November 3, 2023, as part of a three-track single and the second single from his third studio album Ghetto Fabulous (2023). The single helped him achieve recognition, along with his songs "Ain't Nothing" and "Codeine Crazy". The song gained traction on the video-sharing app TikTok and became Amiri's first song to chart on the Billboard Hot 100, debuting at number 79 and peaking at number 60.

== Release ==
The song grew in popularity largely because of its presence on TikTok, where it was used in over 350,000 clips. According to Luminate, it amassed 6.8 million official streams in the United States in the January 26-February 1 tracking week.

== Composition and lyrics ==
The production of the song uses horn blasts over 808s and hi-hats. The lyrics revolve around Rich Amiri's money, drugs, guns, struggles to keep track of his female friends and his lack of trust in others.

== Charts ==
=== Weekly charts ===
Weekly chart performance for "One Call"
Chart (2024)	Peak position
Australia Hip Hop/R&B (ARIA)	29
Canada (Canadian Hot 100)	37
Czech Republic Singles Digital (ČNS IFPI)	46
Global 200 (Billboard)	84
Ireland (IRMA)	75
Latvia (LAIPA)	4
Lithuania (AGATA)	9
New Zealand Hot Singles (RMNZ)	20
Poland (Polish Streaming Top 100)	44
Slovakia Singles Digital (ČNS IFPI)	18
UK Singles (Official Charts)	59
UK Indie (Official Charts)	18
UK Hip Hop/R&B (Official Charts)	29
US Billboard Hot 100	60
US Hot R&B/Hip-Hop Songs (Billboard)	22

=== Year-end charts ===
2024 year-end chart performance for "One Call"
Chart (2024)	Position
US Hot R&B/Hip-Hop Songs (Billboard)	52

== Certifications ==
Certifications for "One Call"
Region	Certification	Certified units/sales
Poland (ZPAV)	Platinum	50,000^{‡}
United States (RIAA)	Platinum	1,000,000^{‡}
^{‡} Sales+streaming figures based on certification alone.
