= Roger Gengo =

American music entrepreneur (born 1992)

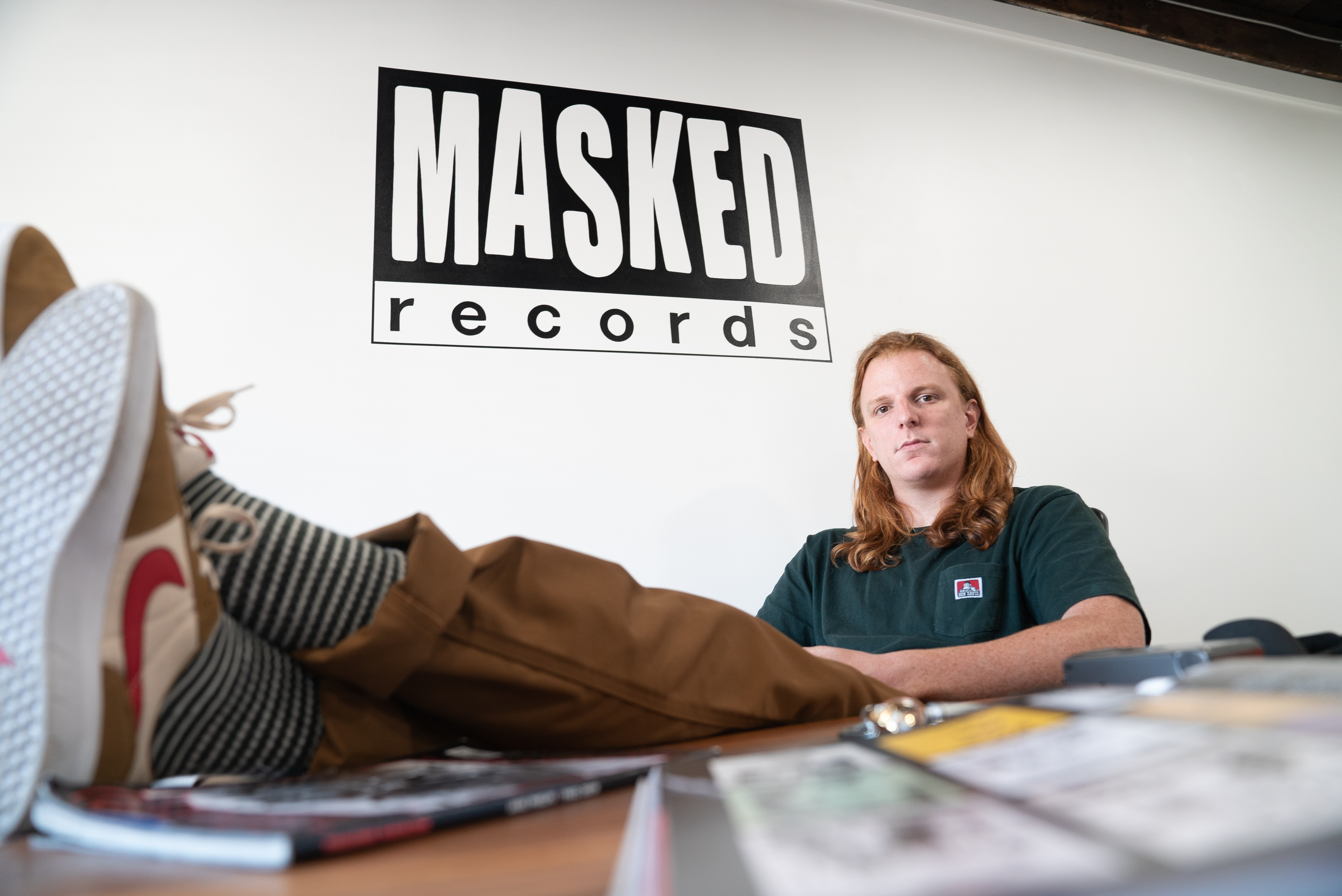
- Born: 1992 (age 33–34); Long Beach, New York, U.S.
- Education: State University of New York at Purchase (attended)
- Occupation: Entrepreneur
- Years active: 2009–present

Roger Gengo (born 1992) is an American music entrepreneur. He is the founder of the multimedia blog, The Masked Gorilla, UNMASKED, a concert series, and MASKED Records, a joint venture with Warner Records.

== Early life and education ==
Gengo was born and raised in Long Beach, New York, where he grew up surfing and skateboarding. A devout rap and punk fan, in high school he scoured the internet for new music and attended backyard shows and all ages gigs at New York clubs. In 2007, he shot a live video of The Cool Kids at SOB's and posted the video to YouTube, creating a new account under the username DopeVideo88.

== Career ==
=== The Masked Gorilla, SoundCloud rap ===
Gengo's Cool Kids video generated significant YouTube views and gained the attention of the band, who sent him new music to post. Subsequently, Gengo started to post music by emerging artists, mostly videos already on YouTube, and DopeVideo88 became a full-fledged channel. As a small community developed, Gengo launched a Blogspot blog devoted to underground hip hop and rap, Dopevideo88. Covering the artists he was passionate about, such as Wiz Khalifa, Currensy, and Casey Veggies, Gengo renamed the blog Masked Gorilla in 2009. Its distribution widened as word spread, and as the creator of Masked Gorilla, Gengo became the youngest person signed to Complex Networks. The resulting traffic generated increased ad revenue, and Gengo, then a freshman at State University of New York at Purchase. hired a small staff. Shortly thereafter, he dropped out of school to work on Masked Gorilla full-time.

The Masked Gorilla profile grew as Gengo became known for "calling out the biggest hip hop stars before anyone else knows who they are." He did the first video interview with Mac Miller, who was then in high school, and featured Kendrick Lamar in 2011, prior to the release of his first studio album, Section.80. He posted the then-independent A$AP Rocky's "Purple Swag", the song that led to A$AP's label deal and mainstream success, and championed the "new wave of genre-defining rappers" such as Lil Peep, Lil Yachty, Pouya, Bones, and Ghostemane.

Gengo was immersed in SoundCloud rap as the "vital and disruptive new movement in hip-hop" genre coalesced in the early-2010s. With Masked Gorilla, he "catalogued the scene from its infancy"; serving as both a curator and an advocate, he became a prominent voice in the SoundCloud rap community.

=== The Unmasked Concert Series, MASKED Records ===
In 2014, Gengo launched the Unmasked Concert Series. In a 2018 interview he said: "If I started Masked Gorilla as a site to talk about artists that I cared about, that I knew kids cared about but other media publications didn't care about, then I wanted to start the UNMASKED concert series to showcase artists that I knew there was interest in, but couldn't get shows."

Gengo originally planned to stage the concert series in New York, but relocated to Los Angeles to take advantage of the youth culture that notably thrived in the Fairfax District. Reflecting the DIY ethos of the punk shows Gengo attended in high school, Gengo booked the performers, found the venues, secured the permits, rented equipment, managed ticket sales and promotion, and provided the catering. The first concert in the series, which took place at a warehouse in Los Angeles, featured Odd Future and Seshollowaterboyz. Although it was advertised only through Masked Gorilla and flyers distributed by Gengo's friends, it sold out, drawing an audience of more than 800 people. Vince Staples headlined the second Unmasked concert, which also took place in a warehouse, and also sold out.

In 2016, in partial response to the Ghost Ship warehouse fire, Gengo decided to move the concerts to more conventional venues. The next series of concerts were held at the Roxy, an established club on the Sunset Strip. Replicating the success of the warehouse shows, Robb Bank$ and Chris Travis, Fredo Santana x Maxo Kream, and $uicideboy$ were sell-outs; subsequent shows at The Troubador and the Echoplex with Yung Lean, Tyler, the Creator, Playboi Carti, Denzel Curry, Ghostemane and Lil Peep also sold out.

In September 2019, Warner Records announced the creation of Masked Records, a joint venture with Gengo. His first signing was 2KBaby. Gengo flew to meet him in Atlanta and in one night listened to more than 25 tracks. The following morning, he flew 2KBaby to Los Angeles, where he signed with Masked. His single "Old Streets" was Masked Records' first release. It was certified gold in October 2020.

In February 2022, Gengo announced a partnership between Live Nation and Masked Gorilla for the inaugural Lookout music festival. The Los Angeles festival combined live performances from hip hop artists and hardcore rock bands such as Ski Mask The Slumped God, $not, Trash Talk, Jesus Piece and more.

In July 2022, Masked Records surpassed 1 billion streams across the label's catalog. The label quickly expanded, adding 17 year old singer Kanii whose single "I Know" was certified gold in September 2023.
