= One Call Away =

One Call Away can refer to:

- "One Call Away" (Chingy song), 2003
- "One Call Away" (Charlie Puth song), 2015
