= Jaydes =

American musician (born 2006)

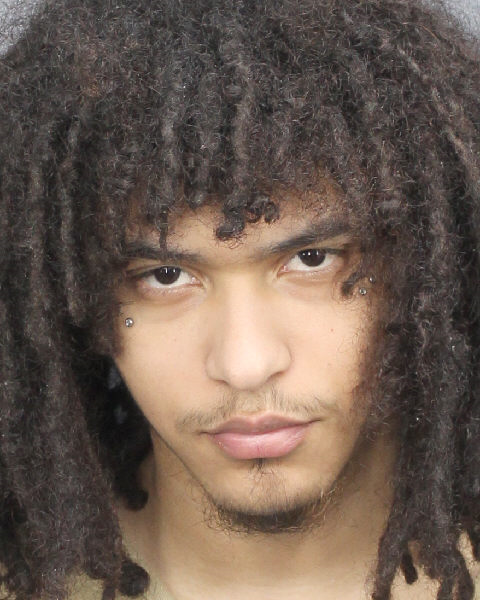
- Jaydes in 2025

Background information
- Also known as: Evvls; Mandy; Yen
- Born: Jayden Yen Dumont; February 24, 2006 (age 20); Pompano Beach, Florida, US
- Genres: Plugg; shoegaze; emo; punk rock; SoundCloud rap; R&B
- Occupations: Rapper; singer; record producer; guitarist
- Works: Discography
- Years active: 2019–present
- Label: 10K Projects
- Website: yentheterrible.com

Jayden Yen Dumont (born February 24, 2006), known professionally as Jaydes (stylized in all lowercase), is an American rapper, singer-songwriter, and record producer. He gained popularity in the 2020s underground rap scene through social media and streaming platforms such as TikTok and SoundCloud.

Born and raised in Pompano Beach, Florida, Dumont began writing and releasing music to SoundCloud under the pseudonym "Evvls" after he switched to online learning in high school. His plugg songs received significant traction in 2021. He released his third extended play (EP) Heartpacing in 2022, followed by his debut studio album Ghetto Cupid in 2023.

== Life and career ==
=== 2006–2018: Early life ===
Jayden Yen Dumont was born on February 24, 2006, in Pompano Beach, Florida. His father is of Haitian descent, while his mother is of Puerto Rican and Dominican descent. Jaydes's father was an R&B artist. As a child, Jaydes's parents often played Jodeci and Erykah Badu around the house. He grew up with a passion for music, and took piano lessons in elementary school and his early teenage years. Jaydes later started releasing music and gained popularity on SoundCloud. At age 16, he stopped attending high school and switched to online learning to focus on his music career and due to controversies at school.

=== 2019–2022: Career beginnings and breakthrough ===
In an interview with the American underground rap blog Masked Gorilla, Jaydes stated that he began making music in 2019, recording his music in Audacity, and has since recorded, mixed, and produced music in FL Studio. In 2020, Jaydes began releasing music to SoundCloud under the pseudonym "Evvls". His singles "Highschool", "Vivienne", "Trust Issues", "South", and "Clueless" would later gain traction online. His plugg songs received significant traction in 2021. Jaydes released his debut extended play (EP) !? in 2021, which rose to prominence when its track "Scam Likely" went viral.

In April 2022, Jaydes released the 4-track EP Romanticism, and later made a guest appearance on the title track of fellow American rapper Rich Amiri's second EP, For The Better. In August 2022, Jaydes released the self-produced EP Heartpacing, which received significant attention and was considered a turning point in his career, with features from fellow rappers Riovaz and Rich Amiri. Jaydes explained in an interview with Pitchfork that he was making music based on how he felt.

=== 2023–2024: Ghetto Cupid, Count Up Dracula, and arrest ===
In August 2023, Jaydes released his debut studio album, Ghetto Cupid, with the introductory track "Rose" gaining significant traction on social media platforms such as TikTok. His single "Belikeme?" (released under his Evvls moniker) was listed by The New York Times as one of the best songs of 2023. He started releasing music consistently in 2024, focusing on mostly raw guitar playing, releasing and teasing such music on SoundCloud under the moniker "Mandy". He collaborated with rapper Yuke on his song "Finesse Cult Anthem" in March 2024. On July 19, 2024, he released his second studio album, Count Up Dracula, which debuted his new punk rock sound. On October 31, he released a follow-up EP, Panic, which he said was recorded live in-studio.

In the opening track of Count Up Dracula titled "Junkie", Jaydes says, "Killed my girlfriend and it felt so good / I opened up her body and I ate her guts". These lyrics, which were initially perceived as shock value, were questioned by fans and critics online after Jaydes's arrest in 2024. On November 3, 2024, a warrant for Jaydes's arrest was issued by the Broward County Sheriff's Office after a report stating that he had stabbed his 17-year-old ex-girlfriend in the neck and arms with scissors and a box cutter when she denied sexual intercourse. She was brought to a pediatric emergency room to get stitches. A week later, on November 10, 2024, 911 was called on Jaydes at a Denny's in Oakland Park, Florida, when he was observed having a mental episode, wielding a knife. He was arrested and charged with attempted murder. Jaydes's attorney filed a written not guilty plea on his behalf on November 14.

== Artistry ==
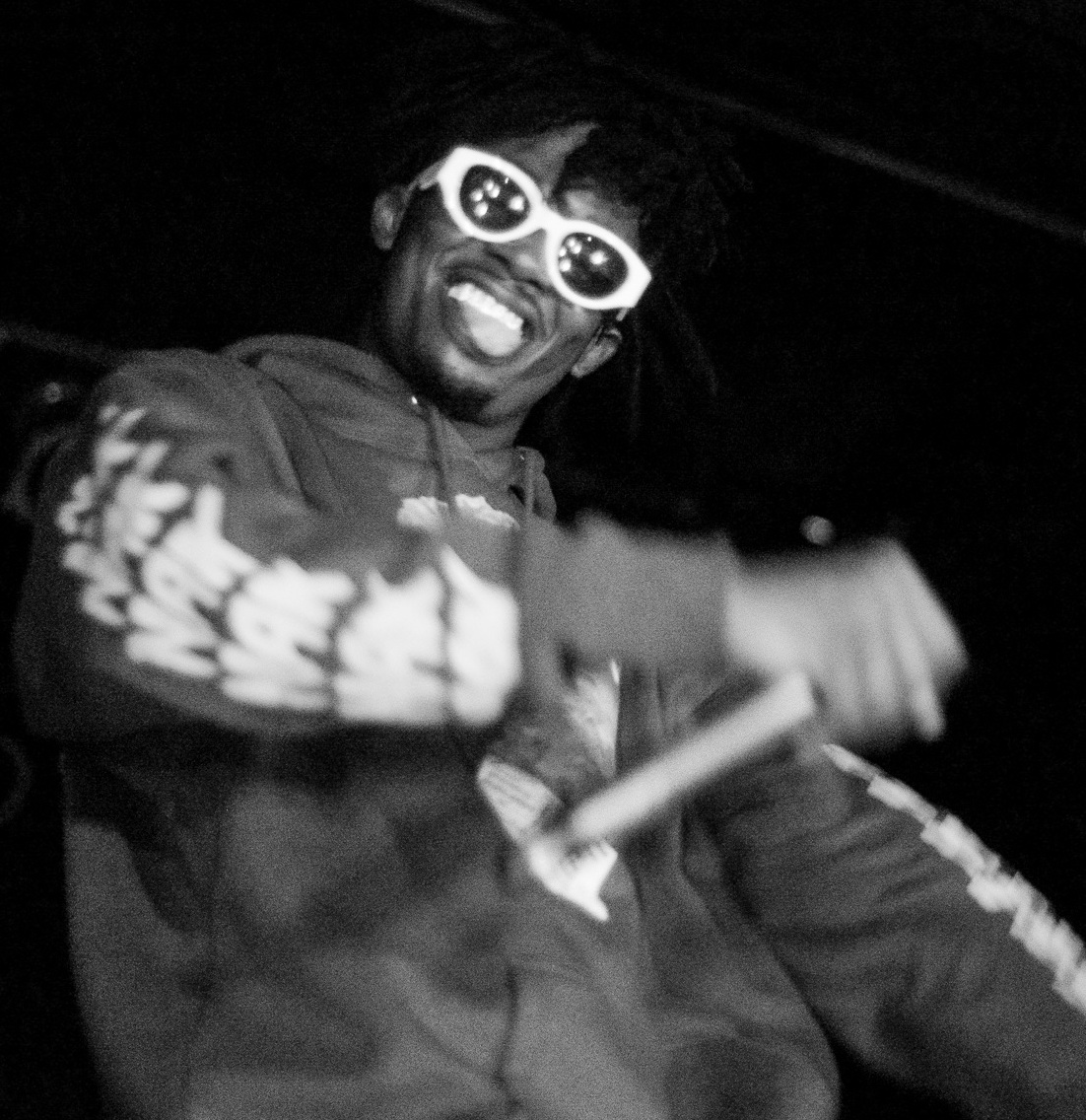
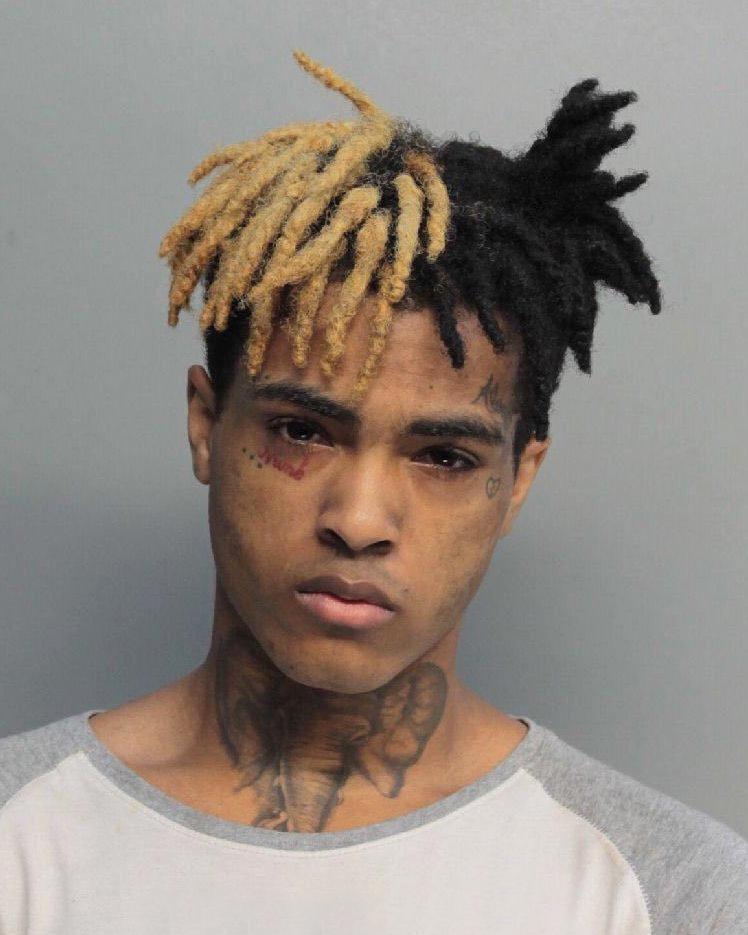
Jaydes has been inspired by a variety of artists, including Playboi Carti (left) and XXXTentacion (right).

Jaydes has referred to artists such as GG Allin, Black Kray, XXXTentacion, and Playboi Carti as his main influences. He is known for his "unique" and "soft" vocal style usually compared to the likes of Lucki and XXXTentacion, alongside the "volatility" of his emotions when singing.

Jaydes's songs explore a wide variety of genres, including emo, shoegaze, SoundCloud rap, and R&B. However, his genre is often classified as plugg. Some critics have felt that Jaydes' music is a refreshing counterpoint to the often saturated characteristic of trending Internet rap. He later switched from his original plugg sound to a shoegaze-oriented sound. Alphonse Pierre of Pitchfork noted that Jaydes' music focuses more on vocal layering than AutoTune. He later commented on Jaydes' third EP, Heartpacing, saying it "rejoined" plugg by pairing emo quavers with the "luxurious" production classical of the style. Pierre wrote that Ghetto Cupid was similar to Lucki's musical style, and felt that the album "pulls together disparate strands, from plugg to shoegaze and emo balladry. It's messy, but it works more often than not".

== Discography ==
Studio albums

- Ghetto Cupid (2023)
- Count Up Dracula (2024)
- Yen (2026)
- You Owe Me (2026)

== Tours ==
As a co-headliner

- Fabulous Tour (with Rich Amiri) (2024)
