= Heartpacing =

EP by Jaydes
- Released: August 14, 2022
- Recorded: 2022
- Genres: R&B; plugg; emo rap
- Length: 16:19
- Labels: 10K Projects; Self-released (initial release)
- Producers: jaydes; Kkei3

Jaydes chronology
Romanticism (2022)	Heartpacing (2022)	Sativa (2022)

Singles from Heartpacing
- 1. "Built Off Slime" Released: August 6, 2022

Heartpacing is the third extended play (EP) by American recording artist Jaydes, released on August 14, 2022, through 10K Projects. Heartpacing contains nine tracks and was supported by one single, "Built Off Slime", alongside features from Rich Amiri and Riovaz.

== Background and recording ==
Following his signing to 10K Projects, a subsidiary of Warner Records, Jaydes began working on a new album project. Heartpacing is a self-produced nine-track EP by Jaydes that clocks in at about 16 minutes. Jaydes had expressed that he had worked on the EP entirely in FL Studio. It includes tracks featuring Rich Amiri and Riovaz. In the years following its release, Heartpacing gained renewed traction.

== Critical reception ==
Heartpacing received generally positive reviews from critics. Writing for Pitchfork, Alphonse Pierre said the project had reconnected plugg by pairing emo quavers with the "luxuriant" production typical of the style. While felt that its "upbeat tracks" had a "bounce", and that "his flow makes every line sound like it ends with a shrug".

== Track listing ==
Jaydes Yen Dumont wrote all tracks; additional writers are listed below.

Heartpacing track listing
No.	Title	Writer(s)	Length
1.	"Built off Slime"		1:57
2.	"Who Can I Trust" (with Rich Amiri)	Elijah Policard	2:17
3.	"Stuck to Script"		1:41
4.	"Sedated"		1:47
5.	"Don't Worry Bout Me"		1:53
6.	"Patience" (with Riovaz)	Brandon Hernandez	2:03
7.	"Never Meet Your Idols"	Kkei	1:44
8.	"Drama Queen"		1:43
9.	"Hateinterlude"		1:19
Total length:			16:19

Notes

- All tracks are stylized in lowercase.

== Personnel ==
- Jaydes – composing, vocals, songwriting, production of all songs
- Rich Amiri – vocals (2)
- Riovaz – vocals (6)
- Kkei – production (7)
