= Riovaz =

- Born: Brandon Hernandez; March 27, 2004 (age 22); Rutherford, New Jersey, U.S.
- Genres: Hip hop; R&B
- Occupations: Rapper; singer; songwriter
- Label: Unsigned
- Website: www.riovaz.com

Brandon Hernandez (born March 27, 2004), known professionally as Riovaz, is an Ecuadorian singer-songwriter and rapper from New Jersey. He gained popularity following his songs that went viral on TikTok: "Heart Racing", "Prom Night," and "I Feel Fantastic". Following his success, he would later sign with Warner Records.

== Career ==
Riovaz started making music at age 13 in 2017. He would release his first song "Shine" through platforms such as YouTube and SoundCloud in July of that year. In 2018, Riovaz released his breakout single, "Prom Night" which would gain virality online, alongside "I Feel Fantastic". "Prom Night" was later certified gold by the Recording Industry Association of America (RIAA). In 2023, Riovaz released his third extended play (EP) Disturb The Norm.

== Tours ==
=== Headlining ===
- RIORAVE Tour (2023)
- RIORAVE II: Disturb The Norm Tour (2023)
- God Is a DJ Tour (2024)
- Self-Titled Debut Album Mini-Tour (2025)

=== Supporting ===
- America Is a Place That Exists Tour (2022)
- Something In The Water Tour (2023)

== Discography ==
=== Studio albums ===
List of albums, with selected details
Title	Album details
Riovaz	Released: October 2, 2024; Label: Riovaz; Format: Digital download, streaming
Follow The Northstar	Released: September 25, 2026; Label: Riovaz; Format: Digital download, streaming

=== EPs ===
List of extended plays, with selected details
Title	EP details
Better Late Than Forever	Released: April 28, 2022; Label: Geffen, Darkroom; Format: Digital download, streaming
Disturb The Norm	Released: February 24, 2023; Label: Geffen, Darkroom; Format: Digital download, streaming
GORE	Released: December 15, 2023; Label: Geffen, Darkroom; Format: Digital download, streaming

=== Singles ===
List of singles as lead artist, with title, year released, album, and chart positions shown
Title	Year	Peak chart positions	Certifications	Album
Title	Year	US Dance	Certifications	Album
"Tantrum (Pace Yourself)"	2022	—	—	Non-album single
"Patience" (Jaydes featuring Riovaz)	2022	—	—	Heartpacing
"Heart Racing" (with Kanii and Nimstarr)	2023	13	—	Exiit
"—" denotes a single that did not chart.

=== Certifications ===
Region	Certification	Certified units/sales
United States (RIAA)	Platinum	1,000,000^{‡}
^{‡} Sales+streaming figures based on certification alone.
