= Rich Amiri =

American rapper

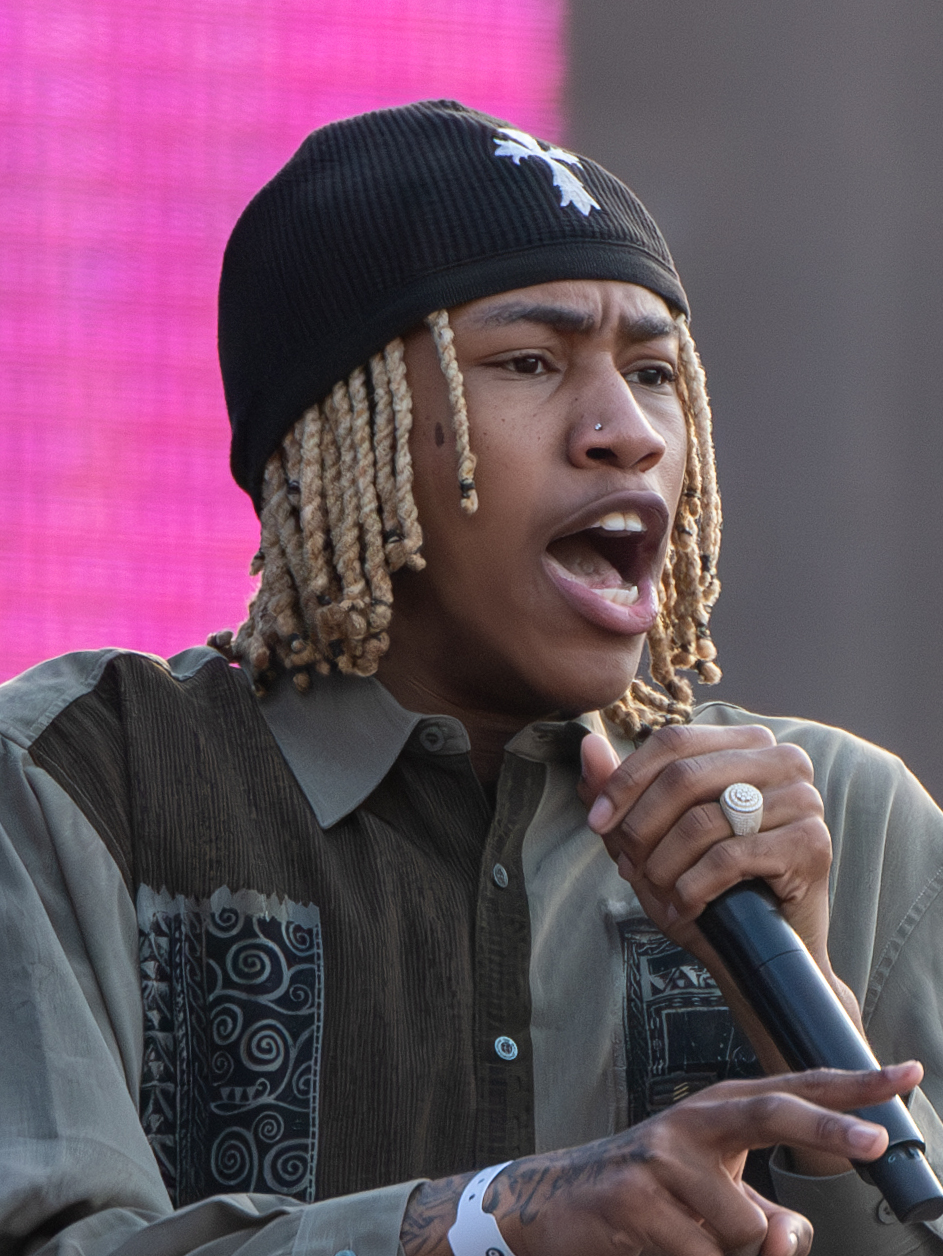
- Rich Amiri in 2024

Background information
- Also known as: Amiri Chase
- Born: Elijah Policard; February 6, 2004 (age 22); Boston, Massachusetts, U.S.
- Origin: Randolph, Massachusetts, U.S.
- Genres: East Coast hip-hop; R&B; pluggnb; rage
- Occupations: Rapper; singer; songwriter
- Years active: 2019-present
- Labels: Internet Money Records; 10K Projects

Elijah Policard (born February 6, 2004), known professionally as Rich Amiri, is an American rapper. He is best known for his 2023 single "One Call", which peaked at number 76 on the Billboard Hot 100. He signed with Internet Money Records and 10K Projects to release his fourth studio album and major label debut, War Ready (2024).

== Career ==
Amiri rose to popularity in 2022 and in the late months of 2023 with his single "Ain't Nothing". He gained further traction within early 2024 with his song "One Call" going viral on TikTok, which lead to the song charting on the Billboard Hot 100, debuting at number 79. He released his album Ghetto Fabulous in 2023. It included singles released in early 2023 such as "Ain't Nothing", "One Call" and "Codeine Crazy".

On December 6, 2024, Amiri released his fourth studio album, War Ready. On October 10, 2025, he released his fifth studio album, titled Grit & Grace, which featured 16 tracks.

== Musical style ==
Amiri cites Future, Speaker Knockerz, Lil Keed, and YoungBoy Never Broke Again as his influences.

== Discography ==
=== Studio albums ===
- For the Better (2022)
- Evolution (2023)
- Ghetto Fabulous (2023)
- War Ready (2024)
- Grit & Grace (2025)

=== EPs ===
- Furegatte (2021)
- Trouble (2022)
- Chase (2022)

=== Charted singles ===
List of singles, with selected chart positions and certifications
Title	Year	Peak chart positions							Certifications	Album
Title	Year	US	US R&B/HH	CAN	LAT	LTU	NZ Hot	WW	Certifications	Album
"One Call"	2024	60	22	37	4	14	20	84	RIAA: Platinum	Ghetto Fabulous
"Keep It Cool" (with Internet Money)	2024	—	—	—	—	—	32	—		War Ready
